= Ethnic groups in the Chittagong Hill Tracts =

Ethnic groups in Bangladesh

The Chittagong Hill Tracts is a region consisting three hilly districts of the south-eastern part of Bangladesh – Khagrachari, Bandarban, and Rangamati – adjoining international boundaries with Myanmar on the southeast, the Indian states of Tripura on the north and Mizoram on the east. It is an extensively hilly area and home to a variety of tribal peoples in the country, which makes up almost 49% of the total population of the region.

Ethnicity in the Chittagong Hill Tracts (2022)
1. Bengali (51.2%)
2. Chakma (23.8%)
3. Marma (10.9%)
4. Tripura (6.97%)
5. Mro (2.70%)
6. Tanchangya (2.24%)
7. Bom (0.64%)
8. Rakhine (0.58%)
9. Khyang (0.22%)
10. Khumi (0.17%)
11. Chak (0.14%)
12. Pankho (0.08%)
13. Lushei (0.03%)
14. Others (0.30%)

In Bangladesh, there are many indigenous peoples living in the other parts of the country, but the majority of these peoples live in the Chittagong Hill Tracts region. Among all of them, the Chakmas are the largest, followed by the Marmas and the Tripuris. Also a good number of mainstream Bengalis live in this area.

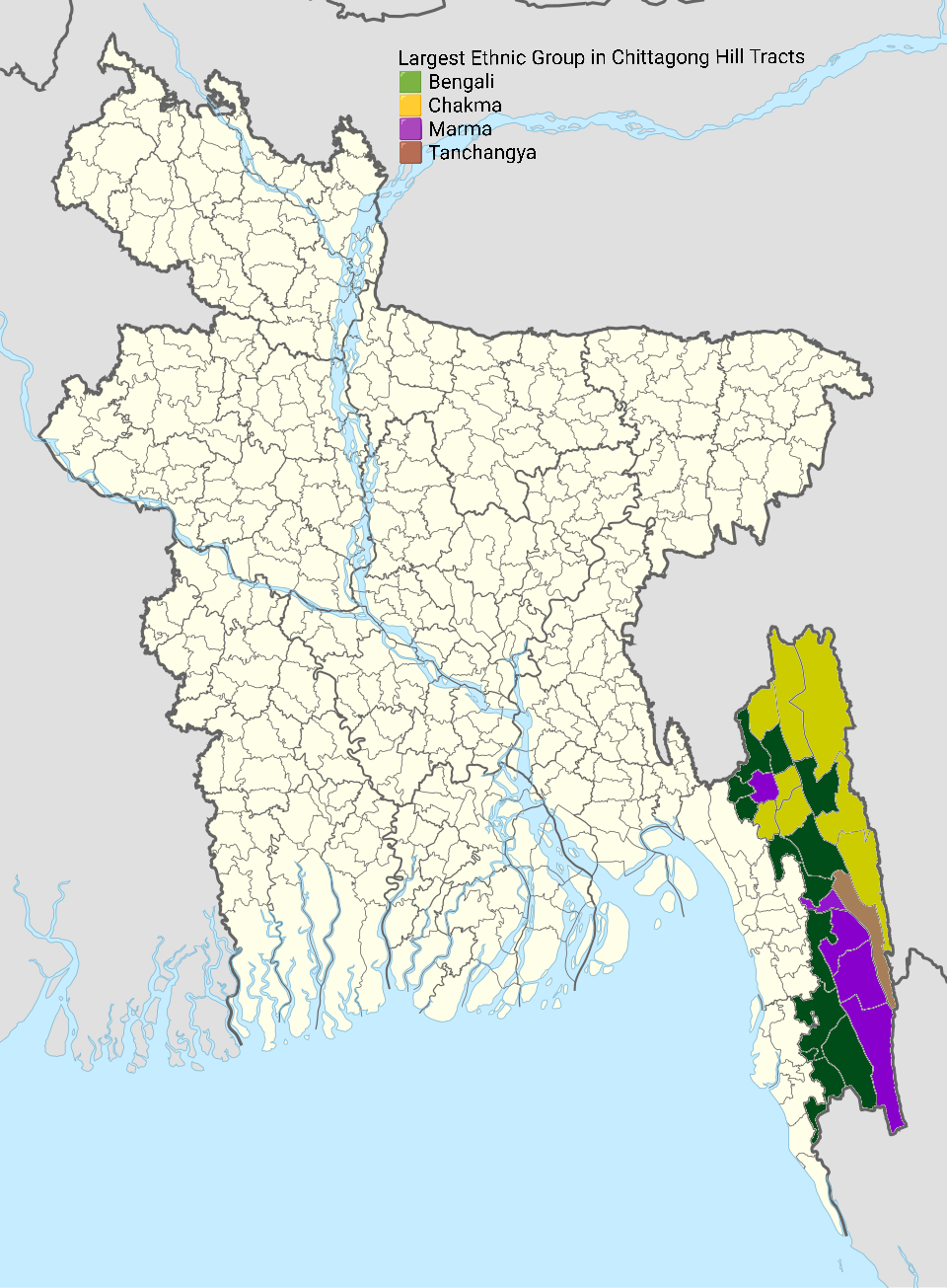
Largest Ethnic Group by Upazila in Chittagong Hill Tracts Based on The 2022 Census

The indigenous peoples of CHT has maintain their unique and different lifestyle from the mainstream Bengali population of the country. Most of these ethnic groups are matriarchal. Their agricultural system is based on grow Jhum cultivation. Some of those groups are still engaged hunting with bows and arrows.

== Bengalis ==
According to 2022 census, Bengalis are the largest ethnic group in Bandarban District (58.85%) and Khagrachhari District (51.07%) and second largest in Rangamati Hill District (42.42%) with almost equal to Chakma people (42.67%) .

Upazila	District	Percentage of population speaking Bengali
Naikhongchhari Upazila	Bandarban District	83.48%
Langadu Upazila	Rangamati Hill District	80.84%
Lama Upazila	Bandarban District	76.22%
Matiranga Upazila	Khagrachhari District	76.01%
Manikchhari Upazila	Khagrachhari District	73.57%
Ramgarh Upazila	Khagrachhari District	73.14%
Alikadam Upazila	Bandarban District	60.64%
Bandarban Sadar Upazila	Bandarban District	56.97%
Kaptai Upazila	Rangamati Hill District	55.71%
Rangamati Sadar Upazila	Rangamati Hill District	52.33%
Kaukhali Upazila	Rangamati Hill District	44.88%
Khagrachhari Sadar Upazila	Khagrachhari District	40.77%
Dighinala Upazila	Khagrachhari District	39.00%
Mahalchhari Upazila	Khagrachhari District	36.95%
Panchhari Upazila	Khagrachhari District	33.02%
Guimara Upazila	Khagrachhari District	33.02%
Rajasthali Upazila	Rangamati Hill District	32.33%
Barkal Upazila	Rangamati Hill District	28.96%
Bagaichhari Upazila	Rangamati Hill District	28.23%
Lakshmichhari Upazila	Khagrachhari District	25.76%
Naniarchar Upazila	Rangamati Hill District	18.27%
Belaichhari Upazila	Rangamati Hill District	15.87%
Ruma Upazila	Bandarban District	13.02%
Thanchi Upazila	Bandarban District	12.38%
Rowangchhari Upazila	Bandarban District	10.51%
Juraichhari Upazila	Rangamati Hill District	4.65%

Unions with highest percentage of Bengalis (10)

1. Kalapakujya Union : 100%
2. Amtali Union : 99.95%
3. Mainimukh Union : 95.20%
4. Naikhongchhari Sadar Union : 92.35%
5. Aziznagar Union : 91.93%
6. Bagachatar Union : 90.47%
7. Chandraghona Union : 89.57%
8. Gulshakhali Union : 89.28%
9. Tabalchhari Union : 88.15%
10. Bhasanyadam Union : 87.85%

== Chakmas ==
According to 2022 census, Chakmas are the largest ethnic group in Rangamati Hill District (42.67%) and second largest in Khagrachhari District (24.53%).

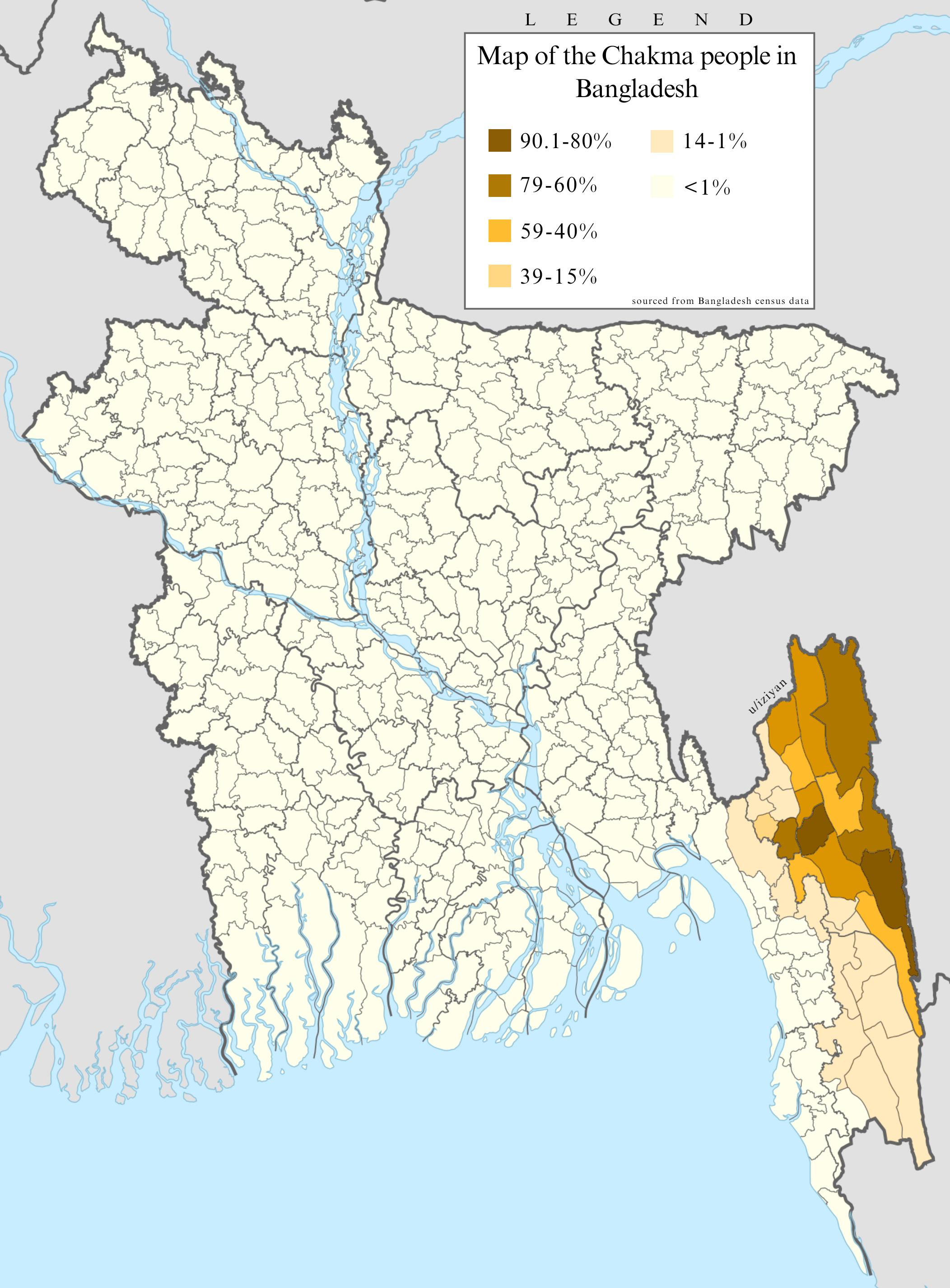
Map showing the percentage of Chakma population by Upazila

Upazila	District	Percentage of Chakma
Juraichhari Upazila	Rangamati Hill District	91.15%
Naniarchar Upazila	Rangamati Hill District	79.89%
Barkal Upazila	Rangamati Hill District	69.33%
Bagaichhari Upazila	Rangamati Hill District	66.19%
Dighinala Upazila	Khagrachhari District	53.38%
Lakshmichhari Upazila	Khagrachhari District	51.33%
Panchhari Upazila	Khagrachhari District	44.04%
Mahalchhari Upazila	Khagrachhari District	43.52%
Rangamati Sadar Upazila	Rangamati Hill District	41.23%
Khagrachhari Sadar Upazila	Khagrachhari District	27.13%
Belaichhari Upazila	Rangamati Hill District	26.68%
Kaukhali Upazila	Rangamati Hill District	25.92%
Guimara Upazila	Khagrachhari District	7.37%
Matiranga Upazila	Khagrachhari District	3.12%
Ramgarh Upazila	Khagrachhari District	2.77%
Langadu Upazila	Rangamati Hill District	2.31%
Kaptai Upazila	Rangamati Hill District	2.25%
Manikchhari Upazila	Khagrachhari District	1.93%
Thanchi Upazila	Bandarban District	1.67%
Bandarban Sadar Upazila	Bandarban District	1.49%
Others	_	<1%

Unions with highest percentage of Chakma (10)

1. Sabekkyong Union : 98.94%
2. Bandukbhanga Union : 98.37%
3. Saroatali Union : 98.01%
4. Dighinala Union : 96.59%
5. Kutukchhari Union : 94.89%
6. Ghilachhari Union : 93.77%
7. Juraichhari Union : 93.51%
8. Bonjogichhara Union : 93.35%
9. Bara Harina Union : 90.89%
10. Maidang Union : 90.50%

== Marmas ==
According to 2022 census, Marmas are Second largest ethnic group in Bandarban District (17.49%), third largest in Rangamati Hill District (7.93%) and fourth largest in Khagrachhari District (10.39%).

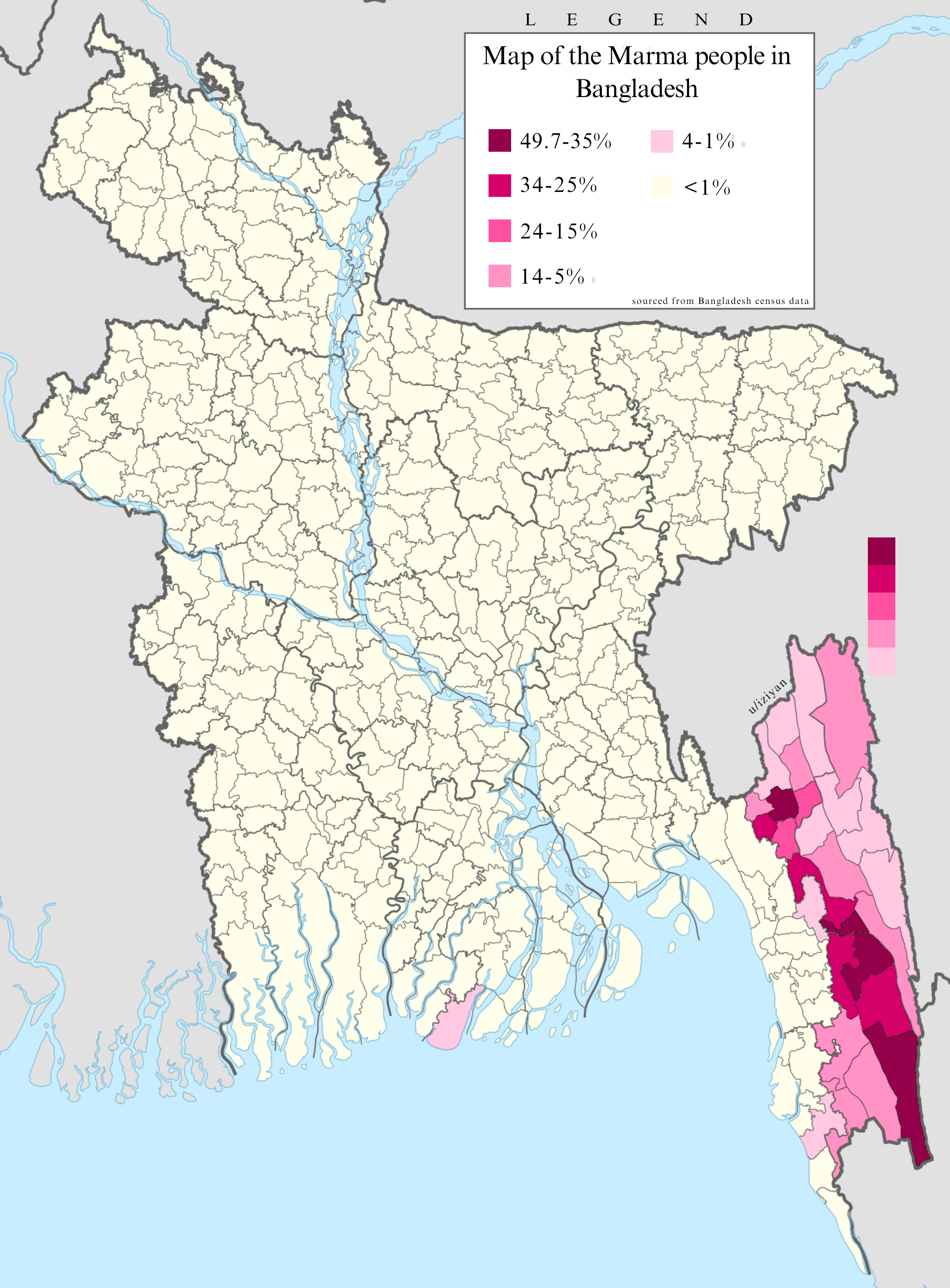
Map of Marma people in Bangladesh by upazila

Upazila	District	Percentage of Marma
Rowangchhari Upazila	Bandarban District	49.48%
Guimara Upazila	Khagrachhari District	38.10%
Rajasthali Upazila	Rangamati Hill District	36.65%
Thanchi Upazila	Bandarban District	31.37%
Ruma Upazila	Bandarban District	31.04%
Kaptai Upazila	Rangamati Hill District	28.59%
Kaukhali Upazila	Rangamati Hill District	27.86%
Bandarban Sadar Upazila	Bandarban District	23.97%
Lakshmichhari Upazila	Khagrachhari District	21.82%
Manikchhari Upazila	Khagrachhari District	18.73%
Mahalchhari Upazila	Khagrachhari District	15.25%
Lama Upazila	Bandarban District	11.32%
Khagrachhari Sadar Upazila	Khagrachhari District	10.86%
Ramgarh Upazila	Khagrachhari District	10.61%
Belaichhari Upazila	Rangamati Hill District	8.97%
Naikhongchhari Upazila	Bandarban District	6.15%
Alikadam Upazila	Bandarban District	6.04%
Panchhari Upazila	Khagrachhari District	3.12%
Matiranga Upazila	Khagrachhari District	2.07%
Rangamati Sadar Upazila	Rangamati Hill District	1.88%
Naniarchar Upazila	Rangamati Hill District	1.73%
Others		<1%

Union with highest percentage of Marma (10)

1. Jamchhari Union : 67.04%
2. Chitmaram Union : 63.28%
3. Gaindya Union : 62.52%
4. Paindu Union : 59.72%
5. Nowapatang Union : 58.08%
6. Rajbila Union : 56.58%
7. Tarachha Union : 53.00%
8. Raikhali Union : 51.77%
9. Kuhalong Union : 49.48%
10. Rowangchhari Union : 48.30%

== Tripuris ==
According to 2022 census, Tripuras are mainly found in Khagrachhari District (13.79%), Bandarban District (4.69%) and Rangamati Hill District(1.90%).

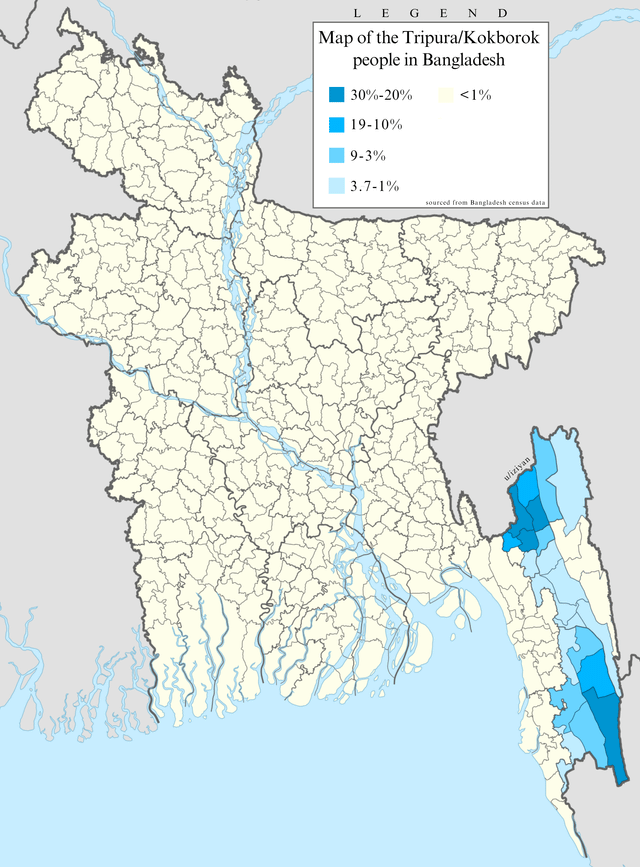
Map of Tripuri people in Bangladesh by upazila

Upazila	District	Percentage of Tripura
Thanchi Upazila	Bandarban District	21.27%
Khagrachhari Sadar Upazila	Khagrachhari District	20.99%
Panchhari Upazila	Khagrachhari District	19.36%
Guimara Upazila	Khagrachhari District	18.79%
Matiranga Upazila	Khagrachhari District	18.68%
Ramgarh Upazila	Khagrachhari District	13.28%
Ruma Upazila	Bandarban District	8.95%
Rajasthali Upazila	Rangamati District	8.16%
Rowangchhari Upazila	Bandarban District	7.73%
Dighinala Upazila	Khagrachhari District	7.38%
Belaichhari Upazila	Rangamati District	6.08%
Manikchhari Upazila	Khagrachhari District	5.60%
Alikadam Upazila	Bandarban District	5.41%
Baghaichhari Upazila	Rangamati District	5.13%
Lama Upazila	Bandarban District	4.12%
Mahalchhari Upazila	Khagrachhari District	3.97%
Bandarban Sadar Upazila	Bandarban District	1.59%
Rangamati Sadar Upazila	Rangamati District	1.50%
Others		<1%

Unions with highest percentage of Tripura (10)

1. Matiranga Union : 81.49%
2. Perachhara Union : 49.43%
3. Latiban Union : 47.75%
4. Bhaibonchhara Union : 57.12%
5. Khagrachhari Sadar Union : 36.00%
6. Guimara Union : 32.49%
7. Tindu Union : 30.70%
8. Patachhara Union ; 27.64%
9. Golabari Union : ২৬.৩০%
10. Sindukchhari Union : 26.27%

== Mrus ==
According to 2022 census, Mru (Murong) are mainly found in Bandarban District(10.69%).

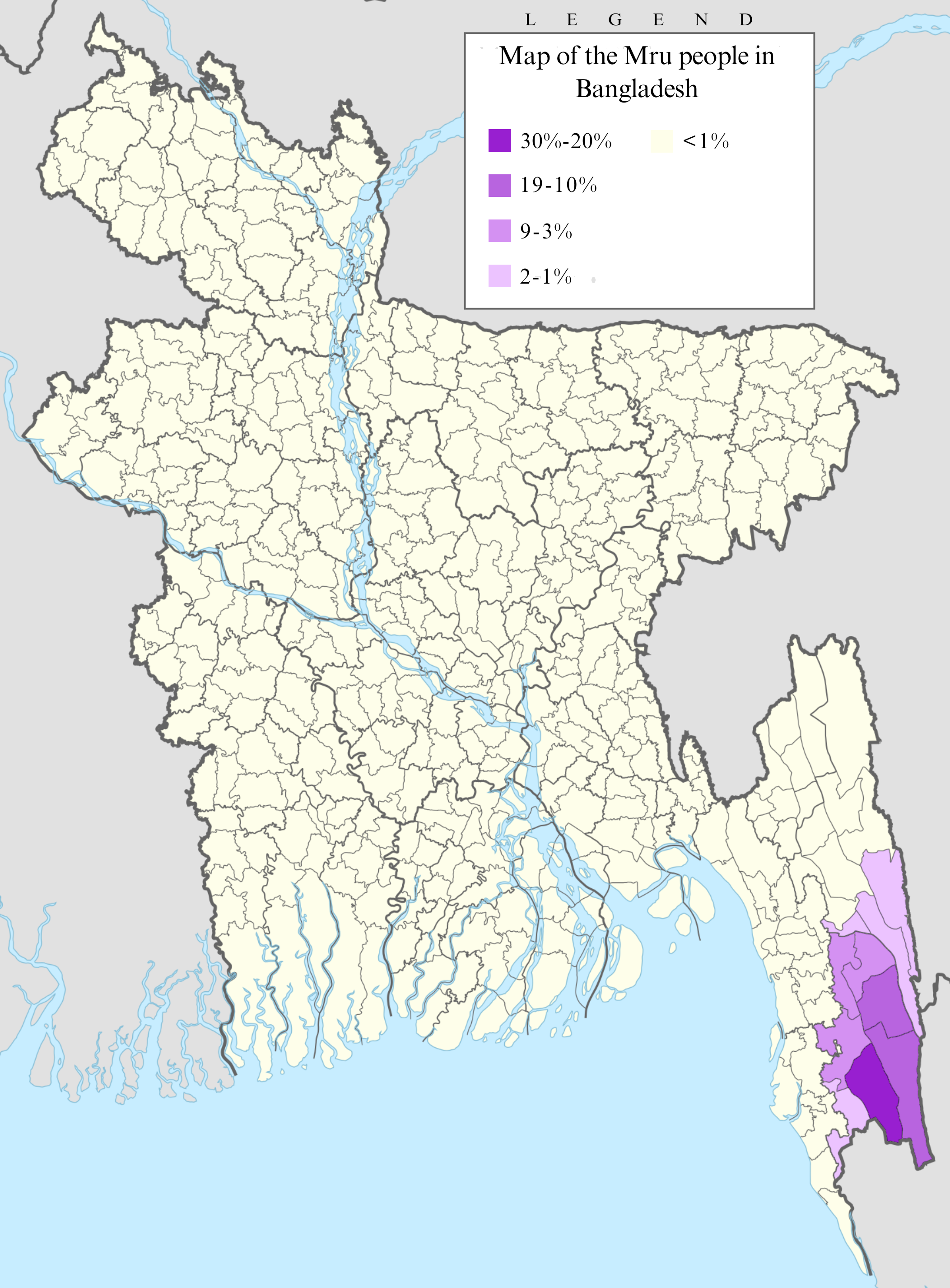
Map showing the expanse of the Mru people in Bangladesh

Upazila	District	Percentage of Mru
Alikadam Upazila	Bandarban District	23.77%
Thanchi Upazila	Bandarban District	23.57%
Ruma Upazila	Bandarban District	22.00%
Lama Upazila	Bandarban District	7.72%
Bandarban Sadar Upazila	Bandarban District	6.55%
Rowangchhari Upazila	Bandarban District	6.08%
Naikhongchhari Upazila	Bandarban District	3.08%

Unions with highest percentage of Mru (10)

1. Kurukpata Union : 79.40%
2. Tankabati Union : 71.20%
3. Ghalangya Union : 66.38%
4. Thanchi Sadar Union : 37.35%
5. Remakri Pransa Union : 25.55%
6. Tindu Union : 23.62%
7. Gajalia Union : 20.79%
8. Remakri Union : 30.19%
9. Tarachha Union : 29.87%
10. Rupshipara Union : 27.28%

== Tanchangyas ==
According to 2022 census, Tanchangyas are mainly found in Rangamati Hill District(4.31%) and Bandarban District (3.09%).

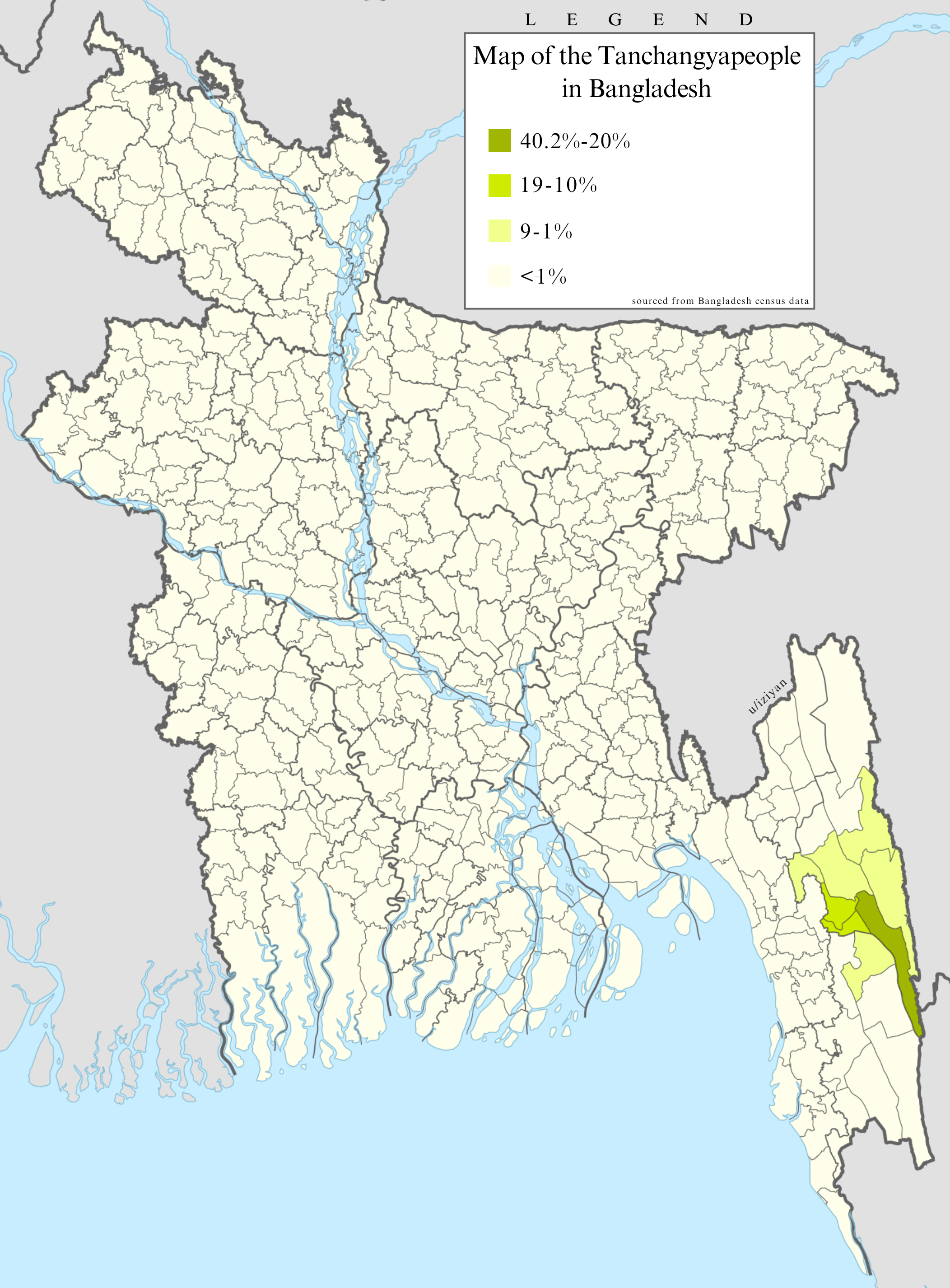
Map showing the percentage of Tanchangya population by Upazila in Bangladesh

Upazila	District	Percentage of Tanchangya
Belaichhari Upazila	Rangamati District	38.77%
Rajasthali Upazila	Rangamati District	16.30%
Rowangchhari Upazila	Bandarban District	14.39%
Kaptai Upazila	Rangamati District	12.42%
Bandarban Sadar Upazila	Bandarban District	5.05%
Naikhongchhari Upazila	Bandarban District	3.77%
Juraichhari Upazila	Rangamati District	3.33%
Alikadam Upazila	Bandarban District	3.10%
Rangamati Sadar Upazila	Rangamati District	2.38%
Kaukhali Upazila	Rangamati District	1.02%
Others		<1%

Unions with highest percentage of Tanchangya (5)

1. Farua Union : 61.62%
2. Ghilachhari Union : 37.08%
3. Wagga Union : 34.88%
4. Belaichhari Union : 34.04%
5. Barathali Union :30.24%

== Boms ==
According to 2022 census, there are 12,311 Bom in CHT. Among them, 11854 (96.29%) Boms live in Bandarban District, constituting 2.46% of district's population.

Upazila	District	Percentage of Bom
Ruma Upazila	Bandarban District	19.89%
Rowangchhari Upazila	Bandarban District	6.79%
Bandarban Sadar Upazila	Bandarban District	2.47%
Thanchi Upazila	Bandarban District	2.30%
Belaichhari Upazila	Rangamati District	1.21%
Others		<1%

== Others ==
=== Khyang ===
According to 2022 census, there are 4,176 Khyang in Chittagong hill tracts. Almost 60%(2502) khyang live in Bandarban District and other 40%(1670) in Rangamati district. They form 5.10% in Rajasthali Upazila, 2.35% in Rowangchhari Upazila, 1.21% in Thanchi Upazila, 1.18% in Bandarban Sadar Upazila and <1% in neighboring Upazila's.

=== Chak ===
According to 2022 census, There are 2,725 Chak people in Chittagong Hill tract. Almost entire 2662(97.69%) Chaks live in Bandarban District and more specifically 2,329(85.29%) Chaks live in Naikhongchhari Upazila, constituting 3.05% of Upazila's population.

=== Khumi ===
According to 2022 census, there are 3,291 Khumi people in Chittagong hill tracts. Almost entire 3287(98.68%) khumis live in Bandarban District. They form 6.14% in Thanchi Upazila, 2.74% in Ruma Upazila, 1.57% in Rowangchhari Upazila and <1% in neighboring Upazila's.

=== Pankho ===
According to 2022 census, there are 1,458 Pankho people in Chittagong hill tracts. Almost entire 1,398(95.88%) Pankhos live in Rangamati district. They form 1.21% in Belaichhari Upazila.

=== Lushei ===
According to 2022 census, there are 216 Lushei people in Chittagong hill tracts. Their population is in Rangamati district 147, Bandarban District 58 and Khagrachhari district 11.

== Religion ==
Islam remains the largest religion in the CHT, predominantly followed by the Bengalis. But indigenous peoples are mainly followers of Buddhism (41.74%). According to the 2022 Bangladesh census, the percentages of Muslims are: Bandarban 52.68%, Khagrachari 46.56% and Rangamati 36.22%. Most of the Christian population is in Bandarban (9.78% of the population). Khagrachari (0.62%) and Rangamati (1.32%) have only small numbers.

Religion in the Chittagong Hill Tracts (2022)
1. Islam (44.5%)
2. Buddhism (41.7%)
3. Hinduism (9.18%)
4. Christianity (3.26%)
5. Other (1.30%)

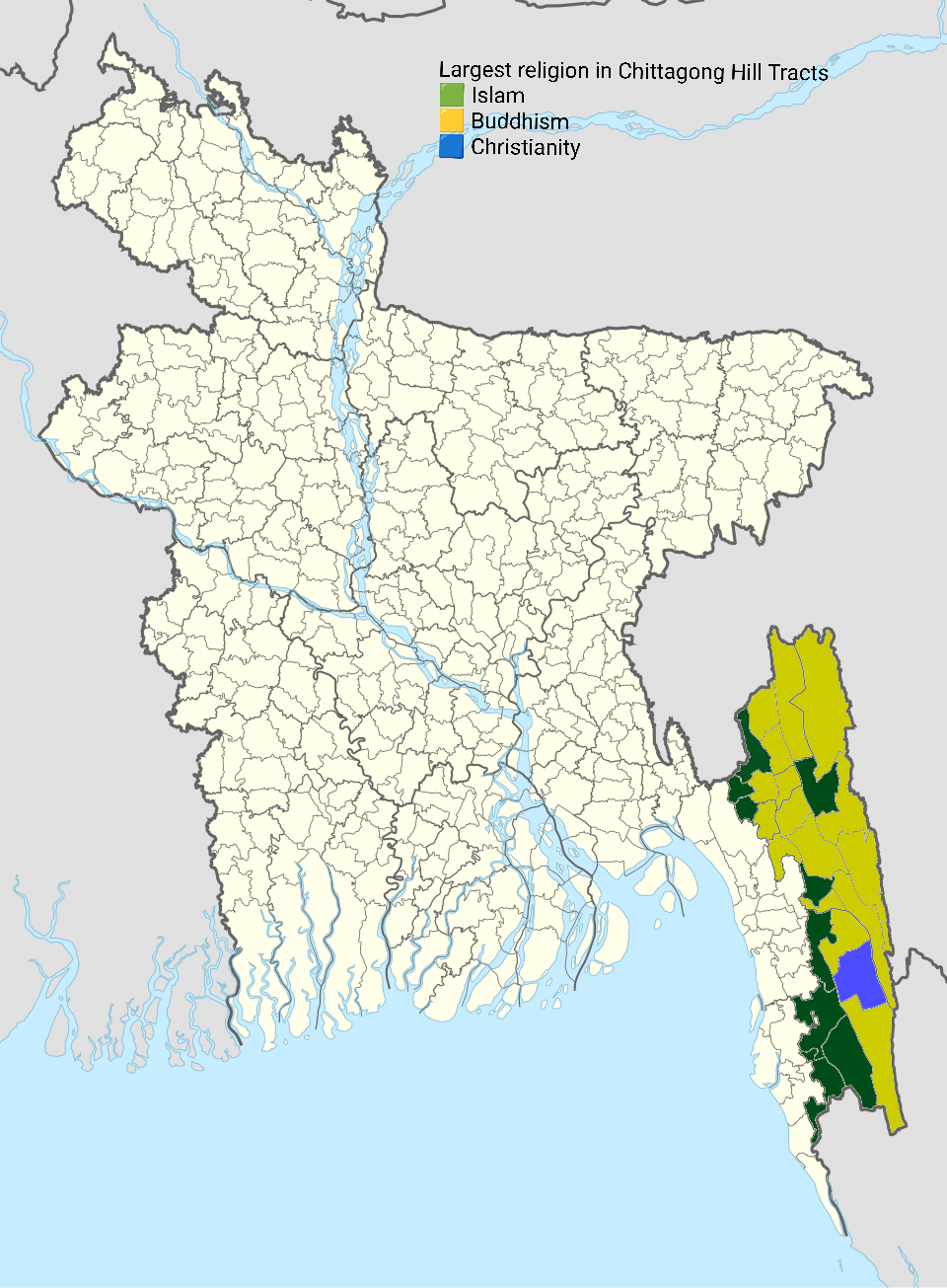
Largest religion in CHT by Upazila

=== Islam ===
According to 2022 census, Islam is the largest religion in Bandarban District(52.68%), Khagrachhari district(46.59%) and the second largest in Rangamati district(36.26%).

Upazila	District	Percent Muslim
Naikhongchhari Upazila	Bandarban District	79.38%
Langadu Upazila	Rangamati Hill District	74.62%
Matiranga Upazila	Khagrachhari District	73.94%
Lama Upazila	Bandarban District	71.65%
Manikchhari Upazila	Khagrachhari District	68.02%
Ramgarh Upazila	Khagrachhari District	65.48%
Alikadam Upazila	Bandarban District	54.71%
Kaptai Upazila	Rangamati Hill District	47.37%
Bandarban Sadar Upazila	Bandarban District	45.77%
Rangamati Sadar Upazila	Rangamati Hill District	40.69%
Kaukhali Upazila	Rangamati Hill District	40.05%
Dighinala Upazila	Khagrachhari District	35.70%
Khagrachhari Sadar Upazila	Khagrachhari District	34.98%
Mahalchhari Upazila	Khagrachhari District	30.94%
Panchhari Upazila	Khagrachhari District	30.78%
Guimara Upazila	Khagrachhari District	30.60%
Bagaichhari Upazila	Rangamati Hill District	24.74%
Barkal Upazila	Rangamati Hill District	22.74%
Rajasthali Upazila	Rangamati Hill District	21.92%
Lakshmichhari Upazila	Khagrachhari District	20.07%
Naniarchar Upazila	Rangamati Hill District	14.84%
Belaichhari Upazila	Rangamati Hill District	10.62%
Thanchi Upazila	Bandarban District	8.80%
Rowangchhari Upazila	Bandarban District	7.87%
Ruma Upazila	Bandarban District	7.38%
Juraichhari Upazila	Rangamati Hill District	3.26%

=== Buddhism ===
According to 2022 census, Buddhism is the largest religion in Rangamati Hill District (57.25%) and second largest in Khagrachhari District (35.93%) and Bandarban District(29.53%).

Upazila	District	Percent Buddhist
Juraichhari Upazila	Rangamati Hill District	95.60%
Naniarchar Upazila	Rangamati Hill District	83.18%
Belaichhari Upazila	Rangamati Hill District	78.21%
Lakshmichhari Upazila,	Khagrachhari District	77.73%
Barkal Upazila	Rangamati Hill District	75.81%
Bagaichhari Upazila	Rangamati Hill District	67.99%
Rowangchhari Upazila	Bandarban District	67.58%
Mahalchhari Upazila	Khagrachhari District	61.67%
Rajasthali Upazila	Rangamati Hill District	58.48%
Kaukhali Upazila	Rangamati Hill District	56.76%
Dighinala Upazila	Khagrachhari District	54.54%
Rangamati Sadar Upazila	Rangamati Hill District	48.50%
Panchhari Upazila	Khagrachhari District	47.25%
Guimara Upazila	Khagrachhari District	46.74%
Kaptai Upazila	Rangamati Hill District	45.35%
Thanchi Upazila	Bandarban District	42.34%
Khagrachhari Sadar Upazila	Khagrachhari District	38.50%
Ruma Upazila	Bandarban District	36.80%
Bandarban Sadar Upazila	Bandarban District	36.49%
Alikadam Upazila	Bandarban District	30.54%
Langadu Upazila	Rangamati Hill District	23.74%
Manikchhari Upazila	Khagrachhari District	21.50%
Naikhongchhari Upazila	Bandarban District	19.41%
Lama Upazila	Bandarban District	17.09%
Ramgarh Upazila	Khagrachhari District	14.63%
Matiranga Upazila	Khagrachhari District	5.58%

=== Hinduism ===
According to 2022 census, Hinduism is third largest religion in Khagrachhari district(16.76%), Rangamati district(5.11%) and fourth largest in Bandarban District(3.43%). Hinduism is the second largest religion in all other districts of Bangladesh except CHT.

Upazila	District	Percent Hindu
Khagrachhari Sadar Upazila	Khagrachhari District	24.76%
Guimara Upazila	Khagrachhari District	22.51%
Panchhari Upazila	Khagrachhari District	21.46%
Matiranga Upazila	Khagrachhari District	19.73%
Ramgarh Upazila	Khagrachhari District	19.16%
Rangamati Sadar Upazila	Rangamati District	10.29%
Manikchhari Upazila	Khagrachhari District	10.15%
Dighinala Upazila	Khagrachhari District	9.41%
Rajasthali Upazila	Rangamati District	8.77%
Bandarban Sadar Upazila	Bandarban District	7.85%
Mahalchhari Upazila	Khagrachhari District	6.93%
Baghaichhari Upazila	Rangamati District	6.67%
Kaptai Upazila	Rangamati District	6.23%
Kaukhali Upazila	Rangamati District	3.09%
Alikadam Upazila	Bandarban District	3.03%
Lama Upazila	Bandarban District	2.92%
Lakshmichhari Upazila	Khagrachhari District	2.07%
Naniarchar Upazila	Rangamati District	1.87%
Ruma Upazila	Bandarban District	1.71%
Thanchi Upazila	Bandarban District	1.55%
Belaichhari Upazila	Rangamati District	1.24%
Langadu Upazila	Rangamati District	1.23%
Barkal Upazila	Rangamati Hill District	0.87%
Rowangchhari Upazila	Bandarban District	0.76%
Naikhongchhari Upazila	Bandarban District	0.70%
Juraichhari Upazila	Rangamati Hill District	0.63%

=== Christianity ===
According to 2022 census, Christianity is third largest religion in Bandarban District(9.78%), fourth largest religion in Rangamati district(1.32%) and Khagrachhari district(0.62%).

Upazila	District	Percent Christian
Ruma Upazila	Bandarban District	37.32%
Thanchi Upazila	Bandarban District	34.43%
Rowangchhari Upazila	Bandarban District	17.83%
Rajasthali Upazila	Rangamati Hill District	10.83%
Belaichhari Upazila	Rangamati Hill District	9.60%
Alikadam Upazila	Bandarban District	6.51%
Lama Upazila	Bandarban District	6.24%
Bandarban Sadar Upazila	Bandarban District	5.83%
Khagrachhari Sadar Upazila	Khagrachhari District	1.75%
Kaptai Upazila	Rangamati Hill District	1.02%
Others		<1%
