= Pittachhara Forest =

Hill forest in Bangladesh

- Location within Bangladesh
- Location: Matiranga, Khagrachhari, Bangladesh
- Coordinates: 23.0989°N 91.8724°E
- Area: 9.3 ha (23 acres)
- Website: pittachhara.org

Pittachhara Forest (Bengali: পিটাছড়া বন) is a privately managed semi-evergreen hill forest located in Matiranga Upazila, Khagrachhari District, Chittagong, Bangladesh. Situated within the Indo-Burma biodiversity hotspot, the forest conserves native flora and fauna in a region affected by deforestation and the expansion of monoculture plantations. The forest is managed by the Pittachhara Trust, a conservation organization.

== History ==
The Pittachhara conservation initiative began in the mid-2010s when conservationist Mahfuz Ahmed Russel and his associates acquired forested land in Khagrachhari District to protect native forest habitats. The initiative was established in response to the decline of natural forests in the Chittagong Hill Tracts, which has been attributed to agricultural expansion, commercial plantations, human settlement, and wildlife hunting.

Initially focused on protecting a small forest area, the project later expanded to include biodiversity conservation, habitat restoration, environmental education, and community engagement.

In 2017, The Pittachhara Trust was established to manage conservation activities in the area.

== Biodiversity ==
Pittachhara Forest supports a variety of wildlife species found in the Chittagong Hill Tracts. Biodiversity surveys and field observations have recorded numerous species of mammals, reptiles, amphibians, and birds in the forest and surrounding areas.

== Recognition ==
Pittachhara Trust is recognized as an Other effective area-based conservation measures (OECM) by the International Union for Conservation of Nature (IUCN).
