= Palashpur =

Matiranga মাটিরাঙ্গা
- Upazila
- Location in Bangladesh
- Coordinates: 23°2.5′N 91°52.5′E
- Country: Bangladesh
- Division: Chittagong Division
- District: Khagrachari District

Area
  - Total: 495.39 km^{2} (191.27 sq mi)

Population (1991)
  - Total: 71,949
  - Density: 145/km^{2} (380/sq mi)
- Time zone: UTC+6 (BST)
- Website: bangladesh.gov.bd/maps/images/khagrachhari/Matiranga.gif

Palashpur is a village in Matiranga Upazila of Khagrachari District, Bangladesh. The village covers an area of 7.43 km^{2} (approx) and is surrounded by Hatiapara village to the East, Kheda Chhara to the North, Ojodda to the West and Matiranga Sadar to the South. Palashpur under Matiranga Pourashava was established in 1981. The village consists of three wards and few Mahallas. The village has a primary school (Palashpur Primary School), four mosques, a madrasa, three community schools and about five small hills. Non-governmental organizations operating in Palashpur include UNDP, BDAO (Bangladesh Development Acceleration Organisation), Grameen Bank, BRAC, ASA.

== Geography ==
Palashpur is located under Matiranga Upazila (Geographic coordinates of Matiranga Upazila is 23.0417°N 91.8750°E and time zone GMT+6). Matiranga Upazila has 14948 units of households and total area of 495.39 km^{2}.

== Demography ==
Palashpur has a population of 1500 of which 66.65% are male and 33.35% are female, 44.70% are tribal and 55.30% are non-tribal. Average population density is 201 per km^{2}. The literacy rate among the villagers is 15.75%. The main occupations of residents of Palashpur are: Agriculture (51.22%), various labourers (30.45%), commerce (10.54%), service (2%), fishing (1.20%), and other (4.59%).

== Religious composition (1991) ==
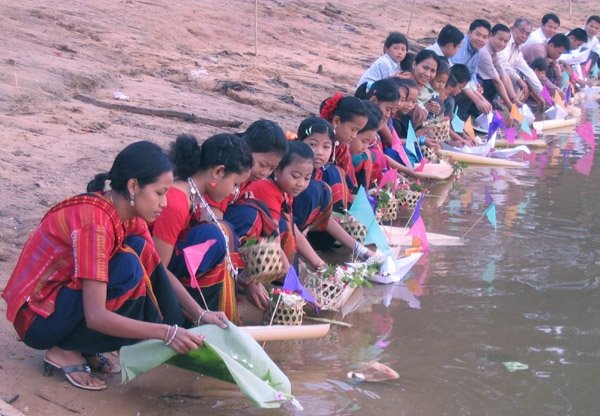
Tribal women near Ful Biju Chengi River, Khagrachhori

Muslim - 47.45%, Buddhist - 35.51%, Hindu - 16.69%, Christian - 0.27% and Others - 0.08%.

== Economy ==
The main agricultural productions in Palashpur are paddy, sugarcane, onion, garlic, pineapple, betel leaf, vegetables and sweet potato. People in Palashpur also produce fruits like banana, jack fruit, mango, papaya, palm, guava, lemon, litchi, coconut, and guava and so on. There are fisheries, hatcheries, poultry and dairy farms in Palashpur. Palashpur is also a great resource of different types of Woods. In Palashpur there is a large Wood Mill where various types of boxes, cartoons and hardboards are produced.

== Natural animals ==
A lot of domestic and wild animals are found in Palashpur. Among the wild animals monkey, few elephants, wild cock, fox, large and poisonous snakes etc. are mentionable.
