= Alutila Cave =

Bangladesh cave

Alutila Cave /Matai Hakor
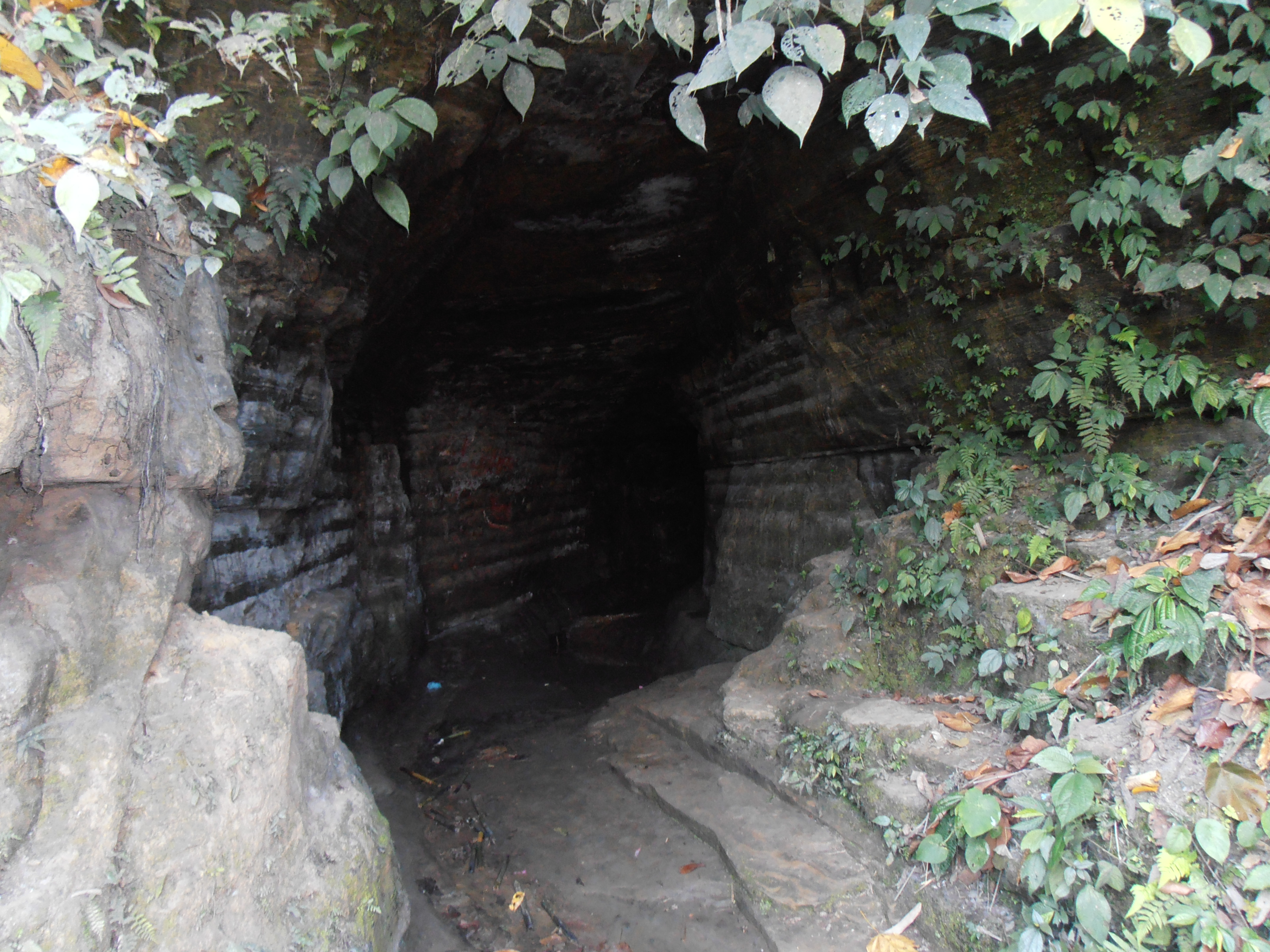
- Alutila Cave
- Interactive map of Alutila Cave /Matai Hakor
- Location: Khagrachari District 7 kilometer from city
- Coordinates: 23°05′18″N 91°57′24″E
- Depth: 3-8 meters (25 feet)
- Length: 100 meters

Matai Hakor(Bengali: মাতাই হাকর) which is widely known as Alutila Cave, also called Alutila Mysterious Cave (Bengali: আলুটিলা গুহা) is a cave located in Matiranga Upazila in hill district of Khagrachari, Bangladesh.

The cave formed inside the 1000-meter-high hill named Alutila (potato hill) or Arbari Hill. The hill area is surrounded by deep green forest.

The cave is 100 meters long. It has a natural subway-like shape with cold water flowing at bottom. The cave is so dark that torches or locally sold flambeaux are used to see well enough to walk around the cave.

== Gallery ==
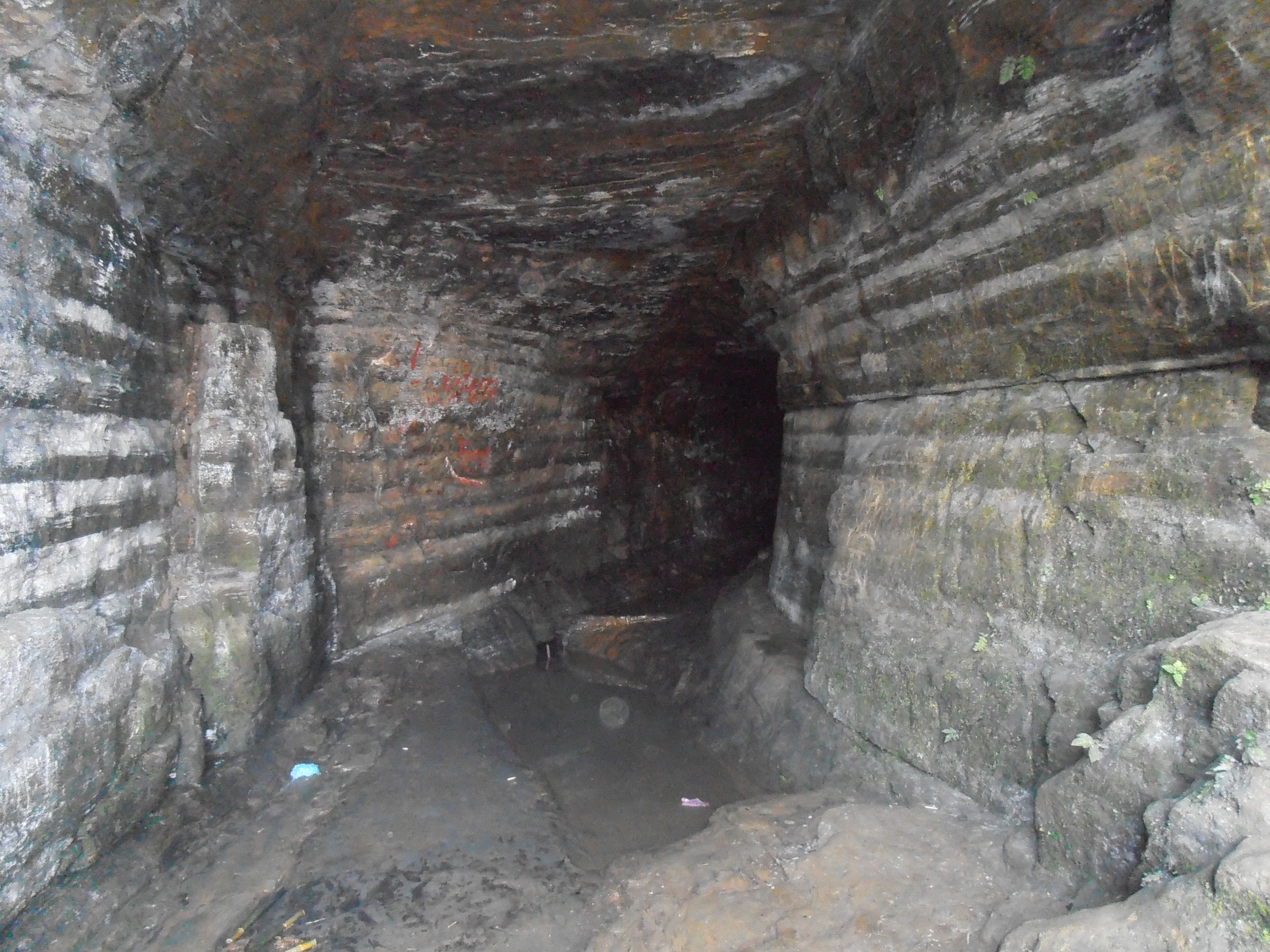
Inside Alutila Cave

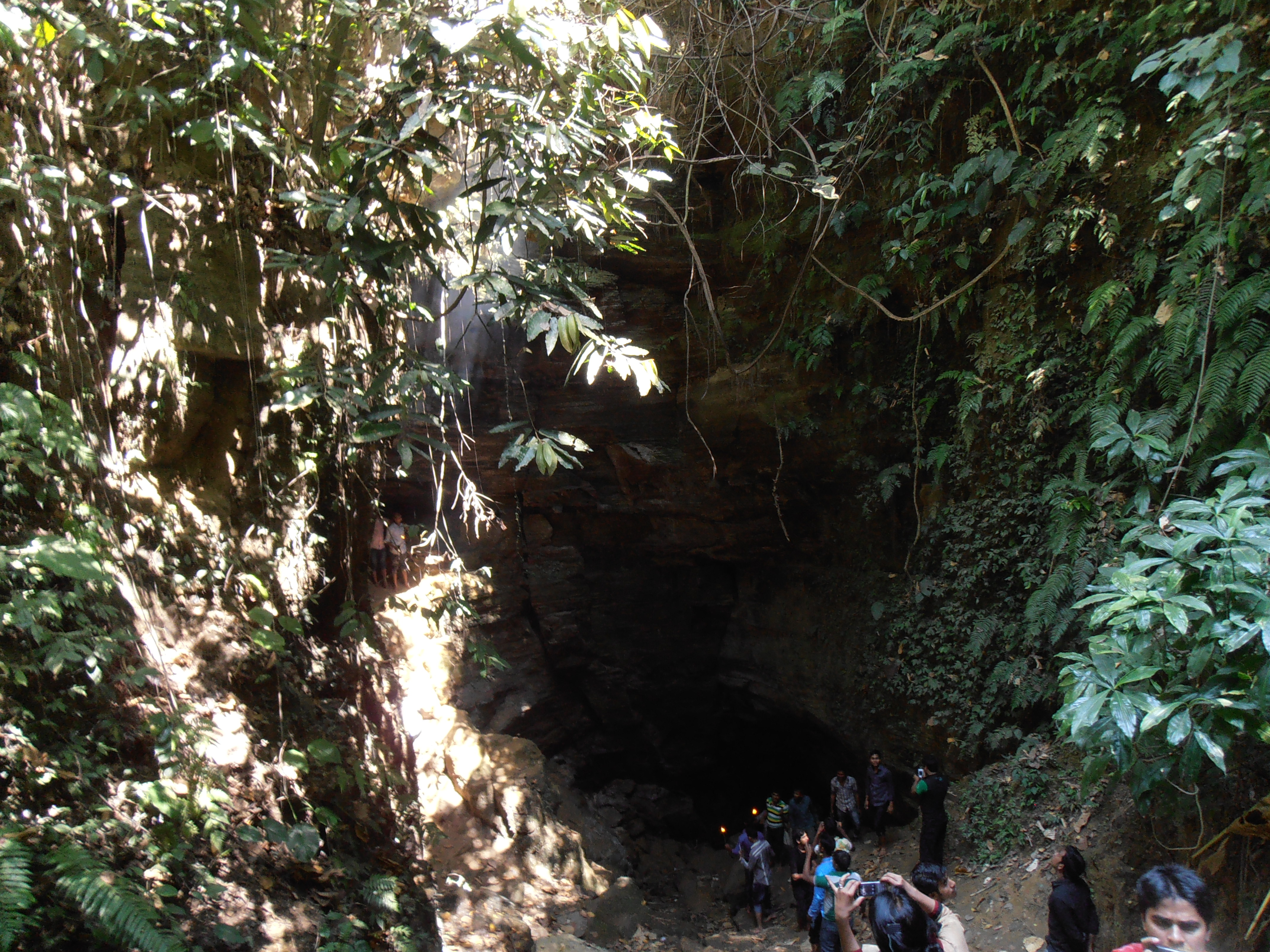
Alutila Cave's exit

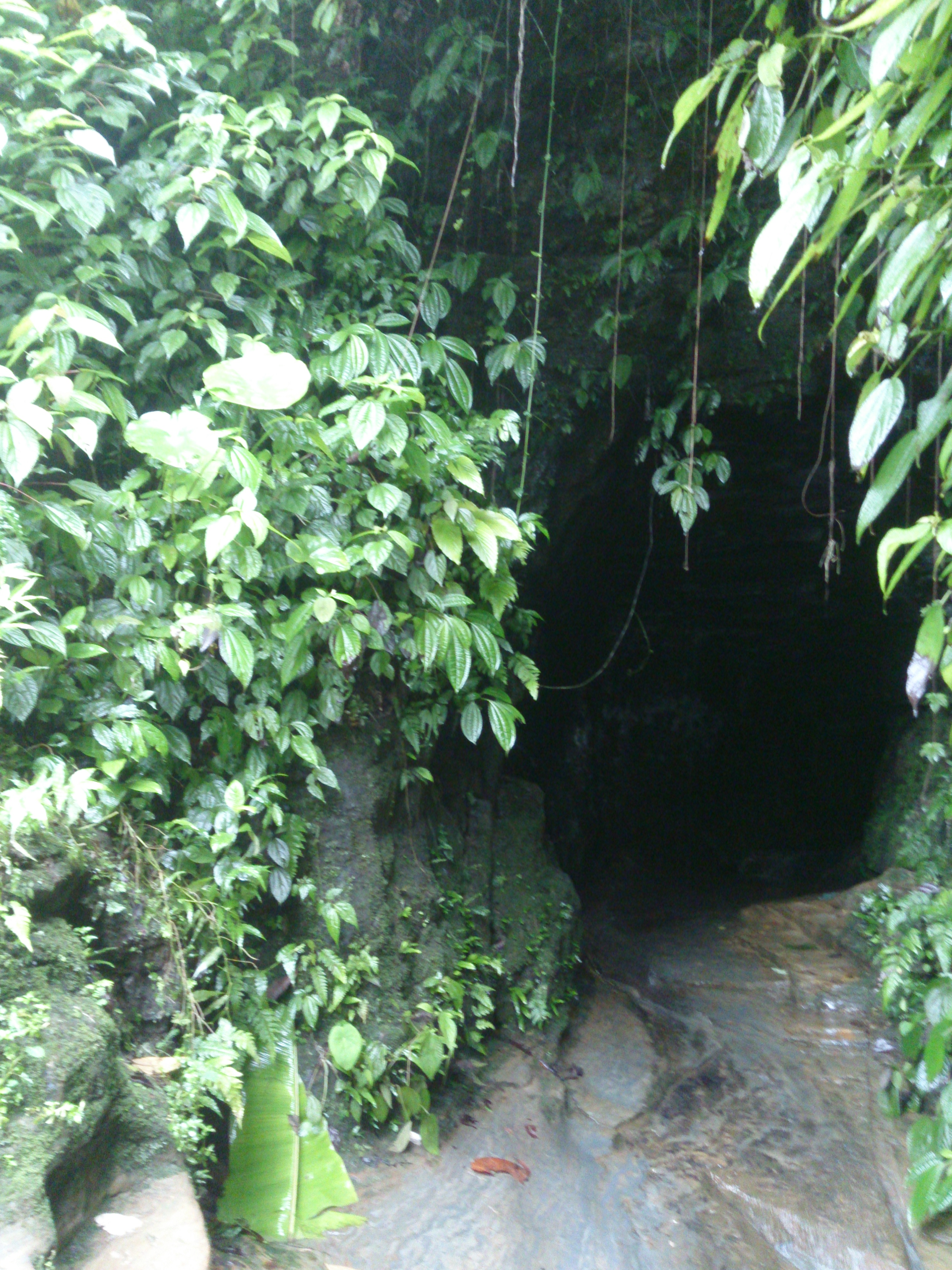
Alutila Cave's entrance

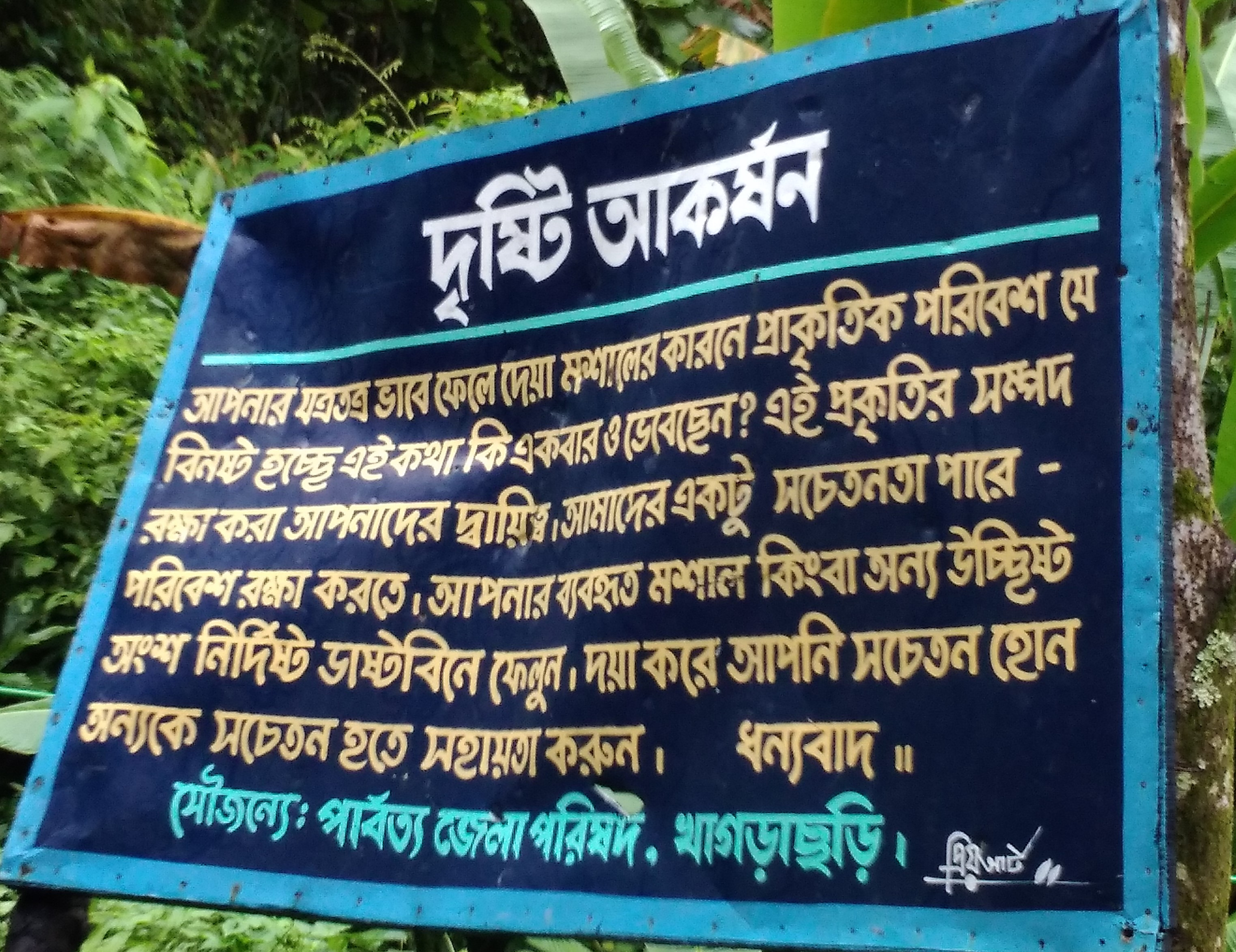
Guidance for tourists
