= Matai Hakor =

Cave in Bangladesh

Coordinates: 23.0890°N 91.9568°E

Matai Hakor is a cave located in the Khagrachari district of southeastern Bangladesh. It is located at the foot of Alutila hill. It is one of the tourist destinations in Khagrachari.

== Location ==
The cave is located in Matiranga Upazila in Khagrachari Hill District of southeastern Bangladesh.
