= Khagrachhari Sadar =

Khagrachhari Sadar may refer to:

- Khagrachhari Sadar Upazila, an upazila of Khagrachhari District
- Khagrachhari Sadar Union, a union of Khagrachhari Sadar Upazila under Khagrachhari District
