= Ramgarh Union =

Union of Khagrachhari District, Chittagong, Bangladesh

Ramgarh রামগড়
- Union
- Interactive map of Ramgarh
- Country: Bangladesh
- Division: Chittagong Division
- District: Khagrachhari District
- Upazila: Ramgarh Upazila

Area
  - Total: 69.93 km^{2} (27.00 sq mi)

Population (2022)
  - Total: 16,040
  - Density: 229.4/km^{2} (594.1/sq mi)
- Time zone: UTC+6 (BST)
- Postal code: 4440
- Website: ramgarhup.khagrachhari.gov.bd

Ramgarh Union is a union of Ramgarh Upazila under Khagrachhari District.

== Demography ==
According to 2022 census, total population of the Union are 16,040. Among them, 10,873 are Muslim, 2,862 are Buddhist, 2,291 are Hindu, 2 are Christian and 12 follow others religion.

Religion-2022
1. Islam (67.8%)
2. Buddhism (17.8%)
3. Hinduism (14.3%)
4. Christianity (0.01%)
5. Others (0.07%)

== Ethnicity ==
This Union is home to a variety of different ethnic groups. Among them, 11,310 are Bengali, 2,529 are Marma, 2,144 are Tripura, 56 are Chakma and 1 are of others ethnic groups.

Ethnicity-2022
1. Bengali (70.5%)
2. Marma (15.8%)
3. Tripura (13.4%)
4. Chakma (0.35%)
5. Others (0.01%)
