= Baranal Union =

Union of Khagrachhari District, Chittagong, Bangladesh

Baranal বড়নাল
- Union
- Interactive map of Baranal
- Country: Bangladesh
- Division: Chittagong Division
- District: Khagrachhari District
- Upazila: Matiranga Upazila

Area
  - Total: 38.85 km^{2} (15.00 sq mi)

Population (2022)
  - Total: 11,105
  - Density: 285.8/km^{2} (740.3/sq mi)
- Time zone: UTC+6 (BST)
- Postal code: 4450
- Website: barnalup.khagrachhari.gov.bd

Baranal Union is a union of Matiranga Upazila under Khagrachhari District.

== Demography ==
According to 2022 census, total population of the Union are 11,105. Among them, 8,592 are Muslim, 1,302 are Hindu, 1,197 are Buddhist and 15 are Christian.

Religion-2022
1. Islam (77.4%)
2. Hinduism (11.7%)
3. Buddhism (10.8%)
4. Christianity (0.13%)
5. Others (0.00%)

== Ethnicity ==
This Union is home to a variety of different ethnic groups. Among them, 8,855 are Bengali, 1,151 are Tripura, 825 are Marma, 268 are Chakma and 6 are of others ethnic groups.

Ethnicity-2022
1. Bengali (79.7%)
2. Tripura (10.4%)
3. Marma (7.43%)
4. Chakma (2.41%)
5. Others (0.05%)
