= Tuari Mairang Waterfall =

Waterfall in Bangladesh

Tuari Mairang (Kokborok: "The shape of the dish") is a waterfall located in Dighinala Upazila of Khagrachhari District, Bangladesh. It is one of the new tourist attractions of the Khagrachari District. The water flow of the waterfall increases during the monsoons as compared to other times of the year. This waterfall is about 100 feet high.

== Location ==
Tuari Mairang is located in Simani Kami or Simana village of Dighinala Upazila of Khagrachari district. By vehicle from Khagrachari town, you have to reach at Noy Mile Kami and from Noy Mile Kami you can walk to Simana Kami. It will take one hour to reach "Tuari Mairang" waterfall
