= Matai Pukhiri =

Pond in Khagrachhari District, Bangladesh

Coordinates: 23°00′56″N 91°58′19″E

- Location: Khagrachhari District, Bangladesh
- Type: Lake
- Max. length: 600 feet (180 m)
- Max. width: 1,500 feet (460 m)
- Surface elevation: 1,200 feet (370 m)

Matai Pukhuri is a small lake located in the Khagrachhari District in Bangladesh. It is sacred to the Tipra Indigenous community. It is located in Nunchari Mouza in Mahalchari Upazila of the Khagrachhari District.

The lake is one of the tourist attractions in Khagrachhari.

== Location ==
Matai Pukhuri lake is located in a mountainous area 1,200 feet (370 m) above sea level. The length of the lake is about 1500 feet (0.46 km), with a width of 600 feet (0.18 km). The water body never dries up and gets filled again during rains or monsoon season. Local people believe that the god who created the lake to meet the water needs of the people of this area. The pond is considered a blessing to the local people.

The Tirtha Mela or Tirtha Festival is held every year in this area where pilgrims come from different areas to visit the site. The lake is recognized as a pilgrimage place for Tripuri people.
