= Taindang Union =

Union of Khagrachhari District, Chittagong, Bangladesh

Taindang তাইন্দং
- Union
- Interactive map of Taindang
- Country: Bangladesh
- Division: Chittagong Division
- District: Khagrachhari District
- Upazila: Matiranga Upazila

Area
  - Total: 44.03 km^{2} (17.00 sq mi)

Population (2022)
  - Total: 14,161
  - Density: 321.6/km^{2} (833.0/sq mi)
- Time zone: UTC+6 (BST)
- Postal code: 4450
- Website: taindongup.khagrachhari.gov.bd

Taindang Union is a union of Matiranga Upazila under Khagrachhari District.

== Demography ==
According to 2022 census, total population of the Union are 14,161. Among them, 11,492 are Muslim, 1,705 are Buddhist, 875 are Hindu and 89 are Christian.

Religion-2022
1. Islam (81.2%)
2. Buddhism (12.0%)
3. Hinduism (6.18%)
4. Christianity (0.63%)
5. Others (0.00%)

== Ethnicity ==
This Union is home to a variety of different ethnic groups. Among them, 11,524 are Bengali, 1,425 are Chakma, 943 are Tripura, 269 are Marma and are of others ethnic groups.

Ethnicity-2022
1. Bengali (81.4%)
2. Chakma (10.1%)
3. Tripura (6.66%)
4. Marma (1.90%)
5. Others (0.00%)
