= Amtali Union, Matiranga =

Union of Khagrachhari District, Chittagong, Bangladesh

Amtali আমতলী
- Union
- Interactive map of Amtali
- Country: Bangladesh
- Division: Chittagong Division
- District: Khagrachhari District
- Upazila: Matiranga Upazila

Population (2022)
  - Total: 9,626
- Time zone: UTC+6 (BST)
- Postal code: 4450
- Website: amtaliup.khagrachhari.gov.bd

Amtali Union is a union of Matiranga Upazila under Khagrachhari District.

== Demography ==
According to 2022 census, total population of the Union are 9,626. Among them, 6,957 are Muslim, 2,559 are Hindu, 80 are Christian, 15 are Buddhist and 15 follow others religion.

Religion-2022
1. Islam (72.3%)
2. Hinduism (26.6%)
3. Christianity (0.83%)
4. Buddhism (0.16%)
5. Others (0.16%)

== Ethnicity ==
This Union is home to a variety of different ethnic groups. Among them, 7,102 are Bengali, 2,508 are Tripura and 16 are of others ethnic groups.

Ethnicity-2022
1. Bengali (73.8%)
2. Tripura (26.1%)
3. Others (0.17%)
