= Barmachhari Union =

Union of Khagrachhari District, Chittagong, Bangladesh

Barmachhari বর্মাছড়ি
- Union
- Interactive map of Barmachhari
- Country: Bangladesh
- Division: Chittagong Division
- District: Khagrachhari District
- Upazila: Lakshmichhari Upazila

Area
  - Total: 72.52 km^{2} (28.00 sq mi)

Population (2022)
  - Total: 6,831
  - Density: 94.19/km^{2} (244.0/sq mi)
- Time zone: UTC+6 (BST)
- Postal code: 4470
- Website: barmachariup.khagrachhari.gov.bd

Barmachhari Union is a union of Lakshmichhari Upazila under Khagrachhari District.

== Demography ==
According to 2022 census, total population of the Union are 6,831. Among them, 61 are Muslim, 6,653 are Buddhist, 99 are Hindu, 18 are Christian and are follower of others religion.

Religion-2022
1. Buddhism (97.4%)
2. Hinduism (1.45%)
3. Islam (0.89%)
4. Christianity (0.26%)
5. Others (0.00%)

This Union is home to a variety of different ethnic groups. Among them, 75 are Bengali, 4,704 are Chakma, 1,943 are Marma, 81 are Tripura and 28 are of others ethnic groups.

Ethnicity-2022
1. Chakma (68.9%)
2. Marma (28.4%)
3. Tripura (1.19%)
4. Bengali (1.10%)
5. Others (0.41%)
