= Mubachhari Union =

Union of Khagrachhari District, Chittagong, Bangladesh

Mubachhari মুবাছড়ি
- Union
- Interactive map of Mubachhari
- Country: Bangladesh
- Division: Chittagong Division
- District: Khagrachhari District
- Upazila: Mahalchhari Upazila

Area
  - Total: 49.21 km^{2} (19.00 sq mi)

Population (2022)
  - Total: 7,698
  - Density: 156.4/km^{2} (405.2/sq mi)
- Time zone: UTC+6 (BST)
- Postal code: 4430
- Website: mubachariup.khagrachhari.gov.bd

Mubachhari Union is a union of Mahalchhari Upazila under Khagrachhari District.

== Demography ==
According to 2022 census, total population of the Union are 7,698. Among them, 2 are Muslim, 7,682 are Buddhist, 11 are Hindu and 3 are Christian.

Religion-2022
1. Buddhism (99.8%)
2. Hinduism (0.14%)
3. Christianity (0.04%)
4. Islam (0.03%)
5. Others (0.05%)

== Ethnicity ==
This Union is home to a variety of different ethnic groups. Among them, 67 are Bengali, 5,382 are Chakma, 2,222 are Marma, 14 are Tripura and 13 are of others ethnic groups.

Ethnicity-2022
1. Chakma (69.9%)
2. Marma (28.9%)
3. Bengali (0.87%)
4. Tripura (0.18%)
5. Others (0.17%)
