= Gumti Union =

Union of Khagrachhari District, Chittagong, Bangladesh

Gumti গোমতি
- Union
- Interactive map of Gumti
- Country: Bangladesh
- Division: Chittagong Division
- District: Khagrachhari District
- Upazila: Matiranga Upazila

Area
  - Total: 103.6 km^{2} (40.0 sq mi)

Population (2022)
  - Total: 13,916
  - Density: 134.3/km^{2} (347.9/sq mi)
- Time zone: UTC+6 (BST)
- Postal code: 4450
- Website: gomtiup.khagrachhari.gov.bd

Gomti Union is a union of Matiranga Upazila under Khagrachhari District.

== Demography ==
According to 2022 census, total population of the Union are 13,916. Among them, 10,894 are Muslim, 2,809 are Hindu, 34 are Christian, 7 are Buddhist and 172 follow others religion.

Religion-2022
1. Islam (78.3%)
2. Hinduism (20.2%)
3. Christianity (0.24%)
4. Buddhism (0.05%)
5. Others (1.24%)

== Ethnicity ==
This Union is home to a variety of different ethnic groups. Among them, 11,007 are Bengali, 2,901 are Tripura and 8 are of others ethnic groups.

Ethnicity-2022
1. Bengali (79.1%)
2. Tripura (20.9%)
3. Others (0.05%)
