= Mayung Kopal =

Tourist site in Bangladesh

Mayung Kopal hill is one of the top tourist spots in Bangladesh, located in Khagrachari Hill District. This hill is 1208 feet above sea level.

== Location ==
Mayung Kopal is located in Perachara Union under Khagrachari Hill District. This hill became one of the tourist destinations especially for those who like to adventure. On the top of the Mayung Kopal, Tripuri indigenous people lives. Chittagong Hill Tracts Development Board constructed the stairs of this hill in 2015 due to difficulty in transporting of hill people through the steep path. To reach on the top of this hill, you have to climb 300 stairs.
