= Belchhari Union =

Union of Khagrachhari District, Chittagong, Bangladesh

Belchhari বেলছড়ি
- Union
- Interactive map of Belchhari
- Country: Bangladesh
- Division: Chittagong Division
- District: Khagrachhari District
- Upazila: Matiranga Upazila

Area
  - Total: 46.62 km^{2} (18.00 sq mi)

Population (2022)
  - Total: 14,601
  - Density: 313.2/km^{2} (811.2/sq mi)
- Time zone: UTC+6 (BST)
- Postal code: 4450
- Website: balchariup.khagrachhari.gov.bd

Belchhari Union is a union of Matiranga Upazila under Khagrachhari District.

== Demography ==
According to 2022 census, total population of the Union are 14,601. Among them, 11,670 are Muslim, 2,224 are Hindu, 494 are Buddhist, 95 are Christian and 118 follow others religion.

Religion-2022
1. Islam (79.9%)
2. Hinduism (15.2%)
3. Buddhism (3.38%)
4. Christianity (0.65%)
5. Others (0.81%)

== Ethnicity ==
This Union is home to a variety of different ethnic groups. Among them, 11,844 are Bengali, 2,321 are Tripura, 246 are Chakma, 171 are Marma and 19 are of others ethnic groups.

Ethnicity-2022
1. Bengali (81.1%)
2. Tripura (15.9%)
3. Chakma (1.68%)
4. Marma (1.17%)
5. Others (0.13%)
