= Latiban Union =

Union of Khagrachhari District, Chittagong, Bangladesh

Latiban লতিবান
- Union
- Interactive map of Latiban
- Country: Bangladesh
- Division: Chittagong Division
- District: Khagrachhari District
- Upazila: Panchhari Upazila

Area
  - Total: 111.37 km^{2} (43.00 sq mi)

Population (2022)
  - Total: 10,259
  - Density: 92.116/km^{2} (238.58/sq mi)
- Time zone: UTC+6 (BST)
- Postal code: 4410
- Website: latibanup.khagrachhari.gov.bd

Latiban Union is a union of Panchhari Upazila under Khagrachhari District.

== Demography ==
According to 2022 census, total population of the Union are 10,259. Among them, 67 are Muslim, 5,224 are Buddhist, 4,822 are Hindu and 146 are Christian.

Religion-2022
1. Buddhism (50.9%)
2. Hinduism (47.0%)
3. Christianity (1.42%)
4. Islam (0.65%)
5. Others (0.00%)

== Ethnicity ==
This Union is home to a variety of different ethnic groups. Among them, 72 are Bengali, 4,335 are Chakma, 4,899 are Tripura, 950 are Marma and 3 are of others ethnic groups.

Ethnicity-2022
1. Tripura (47.8%)
2. Chakma (42.3%)
3. Marma (9.26%)
4. Bengali (0.70%)
5. Others (0.03%)
