= Sindukchhari Union =

Union of Khagrachhari District, Chittagong, Bangladesh

Sindukchhari সিন্দুকছড়ি
- Union
- Interactive map of Sindukchhari
- Country: Bangladesh
- Division: Chittagong Division
- District: Khagrachhari District
- Upazila: Guimara Upazila

Area
  - Total: 64.75 km^{2} (25.00 sq mi)

Population (2022)
  - Total: 8,985
  - Density: 138.8/km^{2} (359.4/sq mi)
- Time zone: UTC+6 (BST)
- Postal code: 4460
- Website: sindukchariup.khagrachhari.gov.bd

Sindukchhari Union is a union of Guimara Upazila under Khagrachhari District.

== Demography ==
According to 2022 census, total population of the Union are 8,985. Among them, 886 are Muslim, 5,501 are Buddhist, 2,587 are Hindu, 11 are Christian and are follower of others religion.

Religion-2022
1. Buddhism (61.2%)
2. Hinduism (28.8%)
3. Islam (9.86%)
4. Christianity (0.12%)
5. Others (0.00%)

== Ethnicity ==
This Union is home to a variety of different ethnic groups. Among them, 1,151 are Bengali, 4,261 are Marma, 2,360 are Tripura, 1,210 are Chakma and 3 are of others ethnic groups.

Ethnicity-2022
1. Marma (47.4%)
2. Tripura (26.3%)
3. Chakma (13.5%)
4. Bengali (12.8%)
5. Others (0.03%)
