= Khagrachhari District =

Khagrachhari Hill District খাগড়াছড়ি পার্বত্য জেলা
- District of Bangladesh
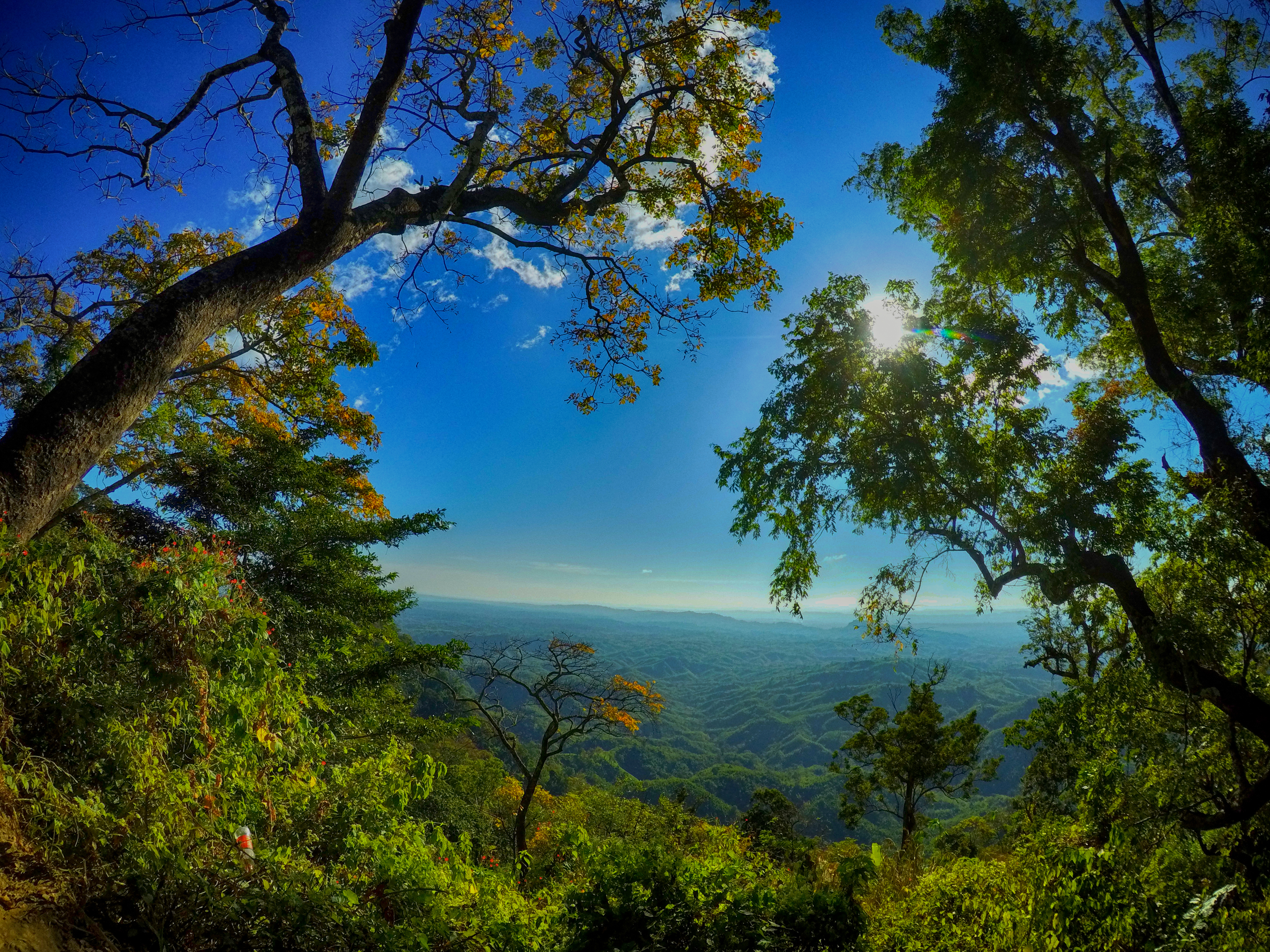
- View of Konglak Hill, Khagrachhari
- Nicknames: প্রাকৃতিক সৌন্দর্যের রাণী ("The Queen of Natural Beauty") উপত্যকার শহর ("The City of Valleys")
- Motto: বৈচিত্র্যে সৌন্দর্য ("Beauty in Diversity")
- Location of Khagrachari District within Bangladesh
- Interactive map of Khagrachhari Hill District
- Coordinates: 23.0417°N 91.9944°E
- Country: Bangladesh
- Division: Chittagong Division
- Established: 1983 (1984)
- Capital: Khagrachhari

Government
  - Type: District Council
  - Body: Khagrachhari Hill District Council
  - District Council Chairman: Mongsui Pru Chowdhury
  - Deputy Commissioner: Protap Chandra Biswas
  - Chief Executive Officer: Md. Nuruzzaman

Area
  - Total: 2,749.16 km^{2} (1,061.46 sq mi)

Population (2022)
  - Total: 714,119
  - Density: 259.759/km^{2} (672.773/sq mi)
- Demonym: Khagrasoria
- Time zone: UTC+06:00 (BST)
- Postal code: 4400
- Area code: 0371
- ISO 3166 code: BD-29
- HDI (2018): 0.593 medium · 14th of 21
- Website: www.khagrachari.gov.bd

Khagrachhari District (Bengali: খাগড়াছড়ি জেলা), officially Khagrachhari Hill District, is a district in the Chittagong Division of Southeastern Bangladesh. It is a part of the Chittagong Hill Tracts region.

== Etymology ==
The zila headquarters is located on the bank of the Chengi river (meaning Chhara in local language) which was full of Catkin plants (meaning Khagra in local language). It is believed that the zila might have derived its name from the above two words 'Khagra' and 'Chhara'.

== History ==
The Chittagong Hill Tracts was loosely under the reign of the Tripura State, the Arakans & the Sultans in different times before it came under the control of the British East India Company in 1760. Although the British got the authority of the Chittagong Hill Tracts in 1760, they had no authority besides collecting nominal taxes. Until 1860, two kings or chiefs governed the internal administration of this region. In 1860, another circle was formed in present Khagrachari zila, inhabited by the Tripura population. The chief or the Raja of this circle was selected from the minority Marma population. The circle was named after the Tripura dialect the Mun Circle, but later, the 'Mun dialect', was changed and renamed as Mong Circle. In 1900 the British offered independent status to Chittagong Hill Tracts recognizing the culture and language of the hill tracts population. But during the Partition of India, this status was abolished and became part of East Bengal, ruled under Pakistan. Then, the name of this subdivision was Ramgarh with its headquarters at Khagrachari. It was upgraded to zila in 1983. Khagrachari Local Govt. Council was established on 6 March 1989 to uphold the political, social, cultural, educational and economic right and to expedite the process of socio-economic development of all residents of Khagrachari Hill District. According to 'Peace Accord' this council was renamed as "Khagrachari Hill District Council (KHDC)" by the Act-10 of 1998. Now this council has been regarded as the main focal point of administration as well as development activities of the district.

== Geography ==
Khagrachari is a hilly area. It is bounded by Tripura state of India on the north and west, Rangamati district to the east and Chittagong District to the southwest. Notable hill ranges are Golamoon, Chotto Panchari, Karmi Mura, Lutiban, Kuradia, Bhanga Mura, Jopisil.

It has three rivers, namely Chengi, Feni and Maini. Chengi is the longest river in Khagrachhari. The main ethnic groups living in the district are Tripuris, Chakmas, Bengalis and Marmas.

== Demographics ==
Historical population
Year	Pop.	±% p.a.
1974	188,975	—
1981	278,461	+5.69%
1991	342,488	+2.09%
2001	525,664	+4.38%
2011	613,917	+1.56%
2022	714,119	+1.38%

According to the 2022 Census of Bangladesh, Khagrachhari District had 169,526 households and a population of 714,119 with an average 4.14 people per household. Among the population, 144,968 (20.30%) inhabitants were under 10 years of age. Khagrachhari had a literacy rate of 71.80%, compared to the national average of 74.80%, and a sex ratio of 100.27 males to 100 females. Approximately, 41.74% of the population lived in urban areas. The population density was 260 people per km^{2}.

As per the 2022 Census, there were a total of 349,390 (48.93%) indigenous people in the district. The population of major ethnic minorities living in the district besides the Bengalis, including: Chakma 175,165, Tripura 98,500 and Marma 74,210.

Ethnicity in Khagrachhari district (2022)
1. Bengali (51.1%)
2. Chakma (24.5%)
3. Tripura (13.8%)
4. Marma (10.4%)
5. Others (0.21%)

Population by ethnicity in Upazila
Upazila	Bengali	Chakma	Marma	Tripura	Others
Dighinala	39 %	53.4 %	0.06%	7.38%	0.52%
Guimara	35.6%	7.37%	38.1%	18.79%	0.14%
Sadar	40.8%	27.1%	10.9%	20.99%	0.30%
Lakshmichhari	25.8%	51.3%	21.8%	0.46%	0.64%
Mahalchhari	37%	43.5%	15.31%	3.97%	0.22%
Manikchhari	73.6%	1.93%	18.7%	5.60%	0.17%
Matiranga	76.1 %	3.12%	2.07%	18.68%	0.03%
Panchhari	33%	44.1%	3.12%	19.36%	0.42%
Ramgarh	73.1%	2.77%	10.6%	13.28%	0.25%

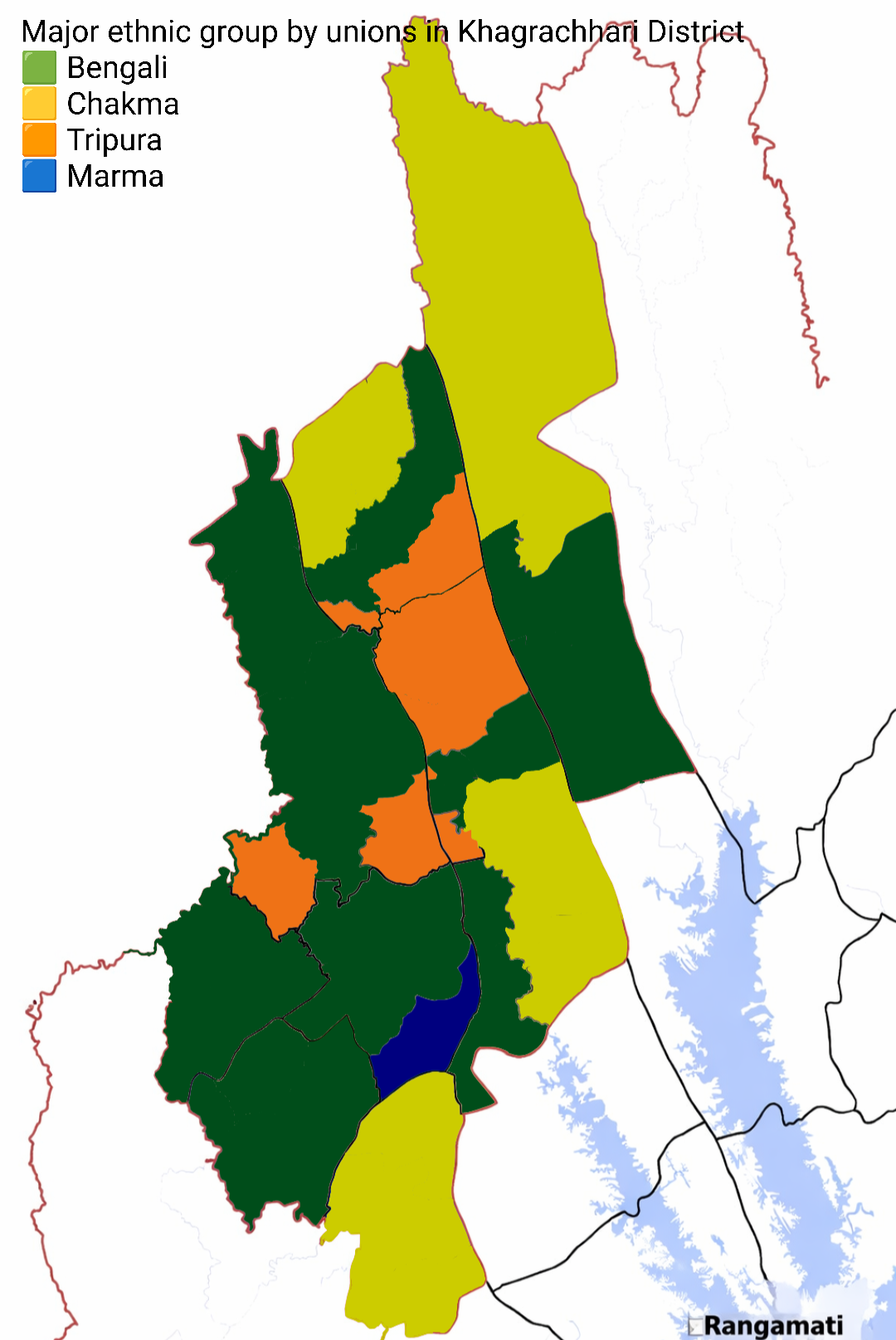
Major ethnic group by unions in Khagrachhari

Population by ethnicity in Union
Upazila	Union	Bengali	Chakma	Tripura	Marma	Others
Khagrachhari	Khagrachhari Paurashava	41,223	11,191	2,527	3,699	235
Khagrachhari	Bhaibonchhara	1,846	8,469	10,713	1,695	13
Khagrachhari	Golabari	6,543	1,707	3,991	2,905	31
Khagrachhari	Kamalchhari	4,285	7,603	1,184	2,887	20
Khagrachhari	Sadar	1,222	2,677	3,723	2,718	3
Khagrachhari	Perachhara	379	5,290	6,438	888	29
Ramgarh	Ramgarh Paurashava	24,675	1,363	83	1,987	104
Ramgarh	Patachhara	8,439	4,558	1,542	1,930	20
Ramgarh	Ramgarh	11,310	2,144	56	2,529	1
Matiranga	Matiranga Paurashava	26,863	922	1,232	297	8
Matiranga	Amtali	7,102	3	2,508	12	1
Matiranga	Baranal	8,855	268	1,151	825	6
Matiranga	Belchhari	11,844	246	2,321	171	19
Matiranga	Gumti	11,007	6	2,901	0	2
Matiranga	Matiranga	1,555	373	11,335	644	3
Matiranga	Tabalchhari	17,597	707	1,256	403	0
Matiranga	Taindang	11,524	1,425	943	269	0
Dighinala	Babuchhara	2,074	12,927	336	25	54
Dighinala	Boalkhali	9,220	8,275	4,066	22	112
Dighinala	Dighinala	455	14,359	20	8	24
Dighinala	Kabakhali	9,185	8,717	26	7	2
Dighinala	Merung	24,082	17,340	4,075	11	14
Guimara	Guimara	6,418	1,170	5,941	4,738	21
Guimara	Hafchhari	11,384	1,547	1,706	11,294	52
Guimara	Sindukchhari	1151	1,210	2,360	4,261	3
Lakshmichhari	Barmachhari	75	4,704	81	1,943	28
Lakshmichhari	Dulyatali	2,326	3,275	8	1,943	2
Lakshmichhari	Lakshmichhari	4,591	5,957	37	2,038	140
Mahalchhari	Kayangghat	1,708	7,225	3	12	4
Mahalchhari	Mohalchhari	9,411	5,483	759	2,853	92
Mahalchhari	Maischhari	6,946	3,267	1,172	2,400	43
Mahalchhari	Mubachhari	67	5,382	14	2,222	13
Manikchhari	Batnatali	10,282	26	1,158	3,661	0
Manikchhari	Juggachhala	9,158	397	2,580	1,312	5
Manikchhari	Manikchhari	21,657	747	116	6,276	63
Manikchhari	Tintahari	15,573	319	459	3,182	56
Panchhari	Chengi	182	7,035	1,490	206	7
Panchhari	Latiban	72	4,335	4,899	950	3
Panchhari	Logang	2,572	6,759	2,901	114	73
Panchhari	Panchhari	12,742	9,298	1,926	459	203
Panchhari	Ultachhari	7,105	2,843	2,079	424	6

🟩 Bengali majority 🟨 Chakma majority 🟧 Tripura majority 🟦 Marma majority

Largest ethnic group in Union and Municipality
Ethnic group	Union	Municipality	Upazila
Bengali	22	3	4
Chakma	10	0	4
Tripura	5	0	0
Marma	1	0	1
Total	38	3	9

=== Bengali in Khagrachhari ===
According to 2022 census, Bengalis are the largest group in Khagrachhari District (51.07%).

By Upazila

Upazila	Population	Percentage of Bengali
Matiranga Upazila	96,352	76.10%
Manikchhari Upazila	56,670	73.57%
Ramgarh Upazila	44,424	73.14%
Khagrachhari Sadar Upazila	55,505	40.77%
Dighinala Upazila	45,020	39.00%
Mahalchhari Upazila	18,133	36.95%
Guimara Upazila	18,955	35.59%
Panchhari Upazila	22,678	33.02%
Lakshmichhari Upazila	6,992	25.76%

By Union (Highest 10)

Union	Upazila	Percentage
Tabalchhari Union	Matiranga Upazila	88.2%
Taindang Union	Matiranga Upazila	81.4%
Belchhari Union	Matiranga Upazila	81.1%
Baranal Union	Matiranga Upazila	79.7%
Tintahari Union	Manikchhari Upazila	79.5%
Gumti Union	Matiranga Upazila	79.1%
Manikchhari Union	Manikchhari Upazila	75%
Amtali Union, Matiranga	Matiranga Upazila	73.8%
Ramgarh Union	Ramgarh Upazila	70.5%
Juggachhala Union	Manikchhari Upazila	68.1%

=== Chakma in Khagrachhari ===
According to 2022 census, Chakmas are the largest indigenous group in Khagrachhari District (24.53%).

By Upazila

Upazila	Population	Percentage of Chakma
Dighinala Upazila	61,618	53.38%
Lakshmichhari Upazila,	13,936	51.33%
Panchhari Upazila	30,270	44.04%
Mahalchhari Upazila	21,357	43.52%
Khagrachhari Sadar Upazila	36,937	27.13%
Guimara Upazila	3,927	7.37%
Matiranga Upazila	3,950	3.12%
Ramgarh Upazila	1,681	2.77%
Manikchhari Upazila	1,489	1.93%

By Union (Highest 10)

Union	Upazila	Percentage
Dighinala Union	Dighinala Upazila	96.6%
Babuchhara Union	Dighinala Upazila	83.9%
Kayangghat Union	Mahalchhari Upazila	80.7%
Chengi Union	Panchhari Upazila	78.9%
Mubachhari Union	Mahalchhari Upazila	69.9%
Barmachhari Union	Lakshmichhari Upazila	68.9%
Logang Union	Panchhari Upazila	54.4%
Kabakhali Union	Dighinala Upazila	48.6%
Kamalchhari Union	Khagrachhari Sadar Upazila	47.6%
Lakshmichhari Union	Lakshmichhari Upazila	46.7%

=== Tripura in Khagrachhari ===
According to 2022 census, Tripuras are second largest indigenous group in Khagrachhari District (13.79%).

By Upazila

Upazila	Population	Percentage of Tripura
Khagrachhari Sadar Upazila	28,576	20.99%
Panchhari Upazila	13,295	19.36%
Guimara Upazila	10,007	18.79%
Matiranga Upazila	23,647	18.68%
Ramgarh Upazila	8,065	13.28%
Dighinala Upazila	8,523	7.38%
Manikchhari Upazila	4,313	5.60%
Mahalchhari Upazila	1,948	3.97%
Lakshmichhari Upazila	126	0.46%

By Union (Highest 10)

Union	Upazila	Percentage
Matiranga Union	Matiranga Upazila	81.5%
Perachhara Union	Khagrachhari Sadar Upazila	49.4%
Latiban Union	Panchhari Upazila	47.8%
Bhaibonchhara Union	Khagrachhari Sadar Upazila	47.1%
Khagrachhari Sadar Union	Khagrachhari Sadar Upazila	36%
Guimara Union	Guimara Upazila	32.5%
Patachhara Union	Ramgarh Upazila	27.6%
Golabari Union, Khagrachhari	Khagrachhari Sadar Upazila	26.3%
Sindukchhari Union	Guimara Upazila	26.3%
Amtali Union, Matiranga	Matiranga Upazila	26.1%

=== Marma in Khagrachhari ===
According to 2022 census, Marmas are third largest indigenous group in Khagrachhari District (10.39%).

By Upazila

Upazila	Population	Percentage of Marma
Guimara Upazila	20,293	38.10%
Lakshmichhari Upazila	5,924	21.82%
Manikchhari Upazila	14,431	18.73%
Mahalchhari Upazila	7,487	15.25%
Khagrachhari Sadar Upazila	14,792	10.86%
Ramgarh Upazila	6,446	10.61%
Panchhari Upazila	2,143	3.12%
Matiranga Upazila	2,621	2.07%
Dighinala Upazila	73	0.06%

By Union (Highest 10)

Union	Upazila	Percentage
Sindukchhari Union	Guimara Upazila	47.4%
Hafchhari Union	Guimara Upazila	43.5%
Mubachhari Union	Mahalchhari Upazila	28.9%
Barmachhari Union	Lakshmichhari Upazila	28.4%
Khagrachhari Sadar Union	Khagrachhari Sadar Upazila	26.3%
Guimara Union	Guimara Upazila	25.9%
Dulyatali Union	Lakshmichhari Upazila	25.7%
Batnatali Union	Manikchhari Upazila	24.2%
Manikchhari Union	Manikchhari Upazila	21.8%
Golabari Union, Khagrachhari	Khagrachhari Sadar Upazila	19.1%

== Religion ==
Religion in the Khagrachhari (2022)
1. Islam (46.6%)
2. Buddhism (35.9%)
3. Hinduism (16.8%)
4. Christianity (0.62%)
5. Other (0.10%)

Religion	1941 (Note: Ramgarh subdivision and Dighinala thana of erstwhile Chittagong Hill Tracts district, which roughly corresponds to the present district. District and tehsil borders have shifted since 1941.)		1981		1991		2001		2011		2022	
Religion	Pop.	%	Pop.	%	Pop.	%	Pop.	%	Pop.	%	Pop.	%
Tribal (Note: 'Tribal' was used as a blanket term for religious traditions of all tribes, and many of these tribes followed a more mainstream religion.)	73,324	96.26%	—N/a	—N/a	—N/a	—N/a	—N/a	—N/a	—N/a	—N/a	—N/a	—N/a
Islam	712	0.94%	89,630	32.19%	162,504	47.44%	228,753	43.52%	274,258	44.18%	332,687	46.59%
Buddhism	—N/a	—N/a	139,166	49.98%	121,631	35.51%	206,473	39.28%	231,309	37.68%	256,600	35.93%
Hinduism	26,907	6.78%	48,160	17.30%	57,158	16.69%	86,351	16.43%	103,195	16.81%	119,706	16.76%
Christianity	0	0%	637	0.23%	939	0.27%	3745	0.71%	4,070	0.66%	4,407	0.62%
Others (Note: Including Jainism, Christianity, Buddhism, Zoroastrianism, Judaism, Ad-Dharmis, or not stated)	207	0.27%	868	0.30%	256	0.09%	342	0.06%	1,085	0.18%	719	0.10%
Total Population	76,171	100%	278,461	100%	342,488	100%	525,664	100%	613,917	100%	714,119	100%

Population by religion in Upazila
Upazila	vMuslim	Buddhist	Christian	Hindu	Others
Dighinala	35.70 %	54.54 %	0.33%	9.41%	0.35%
Guimara	30.60%	46.74%	0.12%	22.51%	0.15%
Sadar	34.98%	38.50%	1.75%	24.76%	1.76%
Lakshmichhari	20.07%	77.73 %	0.13%	2.07%	0.13%
Mahalchhari	30.94%	61.67%	0.41%	6.93%	0.46%
Manikchhari	68.01 %	21.50 %	0.29%	10.15%	0.34%
Matiranga	73.94 %	5.58%	0.42%	19.73%	0.74%
Panchhari	30.78%	47.25%	0.50%	21.46%	0.60%
Ramgarh	65.48%	14.63 %	0.41%	19.16%	0.73%

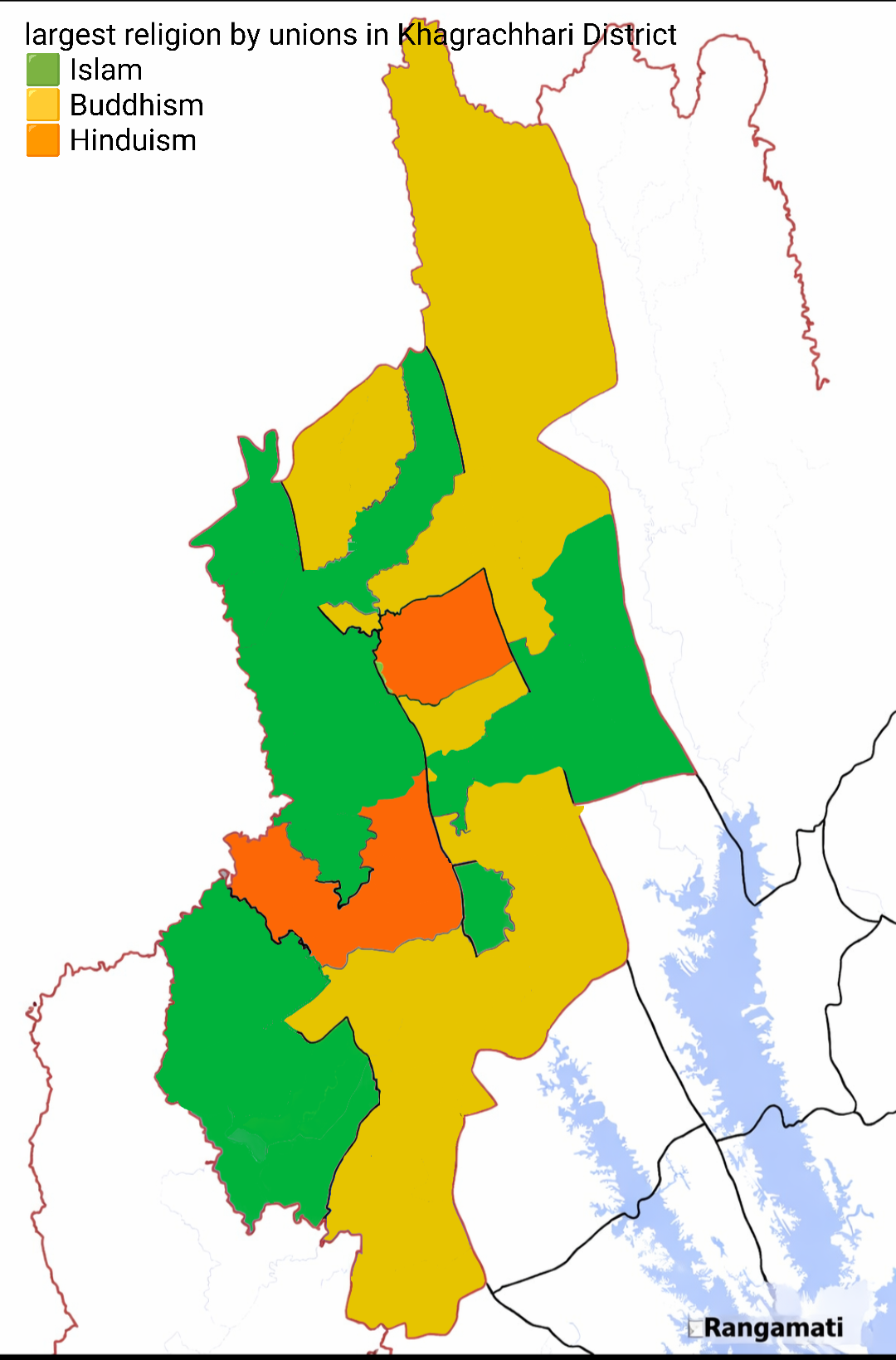
Largest religion by unions in Khagrachhari District

Population by religion in Union
Upazila	Union	Muslim	Buddhist	Hindu	Others
Sadar	Khagrachhari Paurashava	34,561	15,925	7,936	453
Sadar	Bhaibonchhara	1,491	10,180	10,640	212
Sadar	Golabari	5,869	4,701	4,454	73
Sadar	Kamalchhari	4,204	10,020	1,158	293
Sadar	Sadar	1,202	5,399	3,642	61
Sadar	Perachhara	286	6,187	5,883	344
Ramgarh Upazila	Ramgarh Paurashava	20,829	2,296	4,793	287
Ramgarh Upazila	Patachhara	8,068	3,729	4,550	142
Ramgarh Upazila	Ramgarh	10,873	2,862	2,291	14
Dighinala	Babuchhara	1,786	13,024	547	69
Dighinala	Boalkhali	6,809	9,271	5,473	142
Dighinala	Dighinala	395	14,408	36	27
Dighinala	Kabakhali	9,112	8,706	50	69
Dighinala	Merung	23,111	17,551	4,761	99
Guimara	Guimara	4,457	6,328	7,470	33
Guimara	Hafchhari	10,952	13,064	1,933	34
Guimara	Sindukchhari	886	5,501	2,587	11
Lakshmichhari	Barmachhari	61	6,653	99	18
Lakshmichhari	Dulyatali	1,532	5,989	22	11
Lakshmichhari	Lakshmichhari	3,855	8,461	440	7
Mahalchhari	Kayangghat	1,348	7,452	7	145
Mahalchhari	Mohalchhari	7,299	9,171	2,095	33
Mahalchhari	Maischhari	6,537	5,961	1,289	41
Mahalchhari	Mubachhari	2	7,682	11	3
Manikchhari	Batnatali	10,011	3,746	1,370	0
Manikchhari	Juggachhala	9,093	1,709	2,412	238
Manikchhari	Manikchhari	18,877	7,408	2,557	14
Manikchhari	Tintahari	14,404	3,694	1,478	14
Matiranga	Matiranga Paurashava	25,326	1,509	2,351	136
Matiranga	Amtali	6,957	15	2,559	95
Matiranga	Baranal	8,591	1,197	1,302	15
Matiranga	Belchhari	11,670	494	2,224	213
Matiranga	Gumti	10,894	7	2,809	206
Matiranga	Matiranga	1,166	1,020	11,547	177
Matiranga	Tabalchhari	17,518	1,120	1,311	14
Matiranga	Taindang	11,492	1,705	875	89
Panchhari	Chengi	154	7,173	1,482	111
Panchhari	Latiban	67	5,224	4,822	146
Panchhari	Logang	2,472	6,866	3,068	13
Panchhari	Panchhari	11,378	9,938	3,260	42
Panchhari	Ultachhari	7,068	3,248	2,109	32

Largest Religion in Union and Municipality
Religion	Union	Municipality	Upazila
Islam	18	3	3
Buddhism	17	0	6
Hinduism	3	0	0
Total	38	3	9

=== Islam ===
According to 2022 census, Islam is the largest religion in Khagrachhari district(46.59%).

By Upazila

Upazila	Population	Percentage of Islam
Matiranga Upazila	93,618	73.94%
Manikchhari Upazila	52,387	68.02%
Ramgarh Upazila	39,775	65.48%
Dighinala Upazila	41,217	35.70%
Khagrachhari Sadar Upazila	47,620	34.98%
Mahalchhari Upazila	15,186	30.94%
Panchhari Upazila	21,141	30.78%
Guimara Upazila	16,295	30.60%
Lakshmichhari Upazila	5,448	20.07%

By Union (Highest 10)

Union	Upazila	Percentage
Tabalchhari Union	Matiranga Upazila	87.75%
Taindang Union	Matiranga Upazila	81.2%
Belchhari Union	Matiranga Upazila	79.9%
Gumti Union	Matiranga Upazila	78.3%
Baranal Union	Matiranga Upazila	77.4%
Tintahari Union	Manikchhari Upazila	73.5%
Amtali Union, Matiranga	Matiranga Upazila	72.3%
Ramgarh Union	Ramgarh Upazila	67.8%
Juggachhala Union	Manikchhari Upazila	67.6%
Batnatali Union	Manikchhari Upazila	66.2%

=== Buddhism ===
According to 2022 census, Buddhism is the second largest in Khagrachhari District(35.93%).

By Upazila

Upazila	Population	Percentage of Buddhism
Lakshmichhari Upazila	21,103	77.73%
Mahalchhari Upazila	30,267	61.67%
Dighinala Upazila	62,960	54.54%
Panchhari Upazila	32,452	47.25%
Guimara Upazila	24,894	46.74%
Khagrachhari Sadar Upazila	52,412	38.50%
Manikchhari Upazila	16,557	21.50%
Ramgarh Upazila	8,887	14.63%
Matiranga Upazila	7,068	5.58%

By Union (Highest 10)

Union	Upazila	Percentage
Mubachhari Union	Mahalchhari Upazila	99.79%
Barmachhari Union	Lakshmichhari Upazila	97.39%
Dighinala Union	Dighinala Upazila	96.9%
Babuchhara Union	Dighinala Upazila	84.5%
Kayangghat Union	Mahalchhari Upazila	84.2%
Chengi Union	Panchhari Upazila	80.4%
Dulyatali Union	Lakshmichhari Upazila	79.3%
Lakshmichhari Union	Lakshmichhari Upazila	66.3%
Kamalchhari Union	Khagrachhari Sadar Upazila	62.7%
Sindukchhari Union	Guimara Upazila	61.2%

=== Hinduism ===
According to 2022 census, Hinduism is third largest religion in Khagrachhari district(16.76%).

By Upazila

Upazila	Population	Percentage of Hinduism
Khagrachhari Sadar Upazila	33713	24.76%
Guimara Upazila	11991	22.51%
Panchhari Upazila	14741	21.46%
Matiranga Upazila	24978	19.73%
Ramgarh Upazila	11636	19.16%
Manikchhari Upazila	7817	10.15%
Dighinala Upazila	10867	9.41%
Mahalchhari Upazila	3402	6.93%
Lakshmichhari Upazila	561	2.07%

By Union (Highest 10)

Union	Upazila	Percentage
Matiranga Union	Matiranga Upazila	83.01%
Latiban Union	Panchhari Upazila	47%
Bhaibonchhara Union	Khagrachhari Sadar Upazila	46.8%
Perachhara Union	Khagrachhari Sadar Upazila	45.17%
Guimara Union	Guimara Upazila	40.85%
Khagrachhari Sadar Union	Khagrachhari Sadar Upazila	35.21%
Golabari Union, Khagrachhari	Khagrachhari Sadar Upazila	29.35%
Sindukchhari Union	Guimara Upazila	28.8%
Patachhara Union	Ramgarh Upazila	27.59%
Amtali Union, Matiranga	Matiranga Upazila	26.58%

=== Christianity ===
According to 2022 census, Christianity is the fourth largest religion in Khagrachhari district(0.62%).

Upazila	Population	Percentage of Christian
Khagrachhari Sadar Upazila	2,380	1.75%
Panchhari Upazila	341	0.50%
Matiranga Upazila	536	0.42%
Mahalchhari Upazila	200	0.41%
Ramgarh Upazila	248	0.41%
Dighinala Upazila	380	0.33%
Manikchhari Upazila	221	0.29%
Lakshmichhari Upazila	36	0.13%
Guimara Upazila	65	0.12%

== Subdivisions ==
Khagrachhari District upazila geocode map

Upazilas under this district are:

1. Dighinala Upazila
2. Khagrachhari Sadar Upazila
3. Lakshmichhari Upazila
4. Mahalchhari Upazila
5. Manikchhari Upazila
6. Matiranga Upazila
7. Panchhari Upazila
8. Ramgarh Upazila
9. Guimara Upazila

== Administration ==
Khagrachhari district consist of 3 Paurashava, 9 Upazila/Thana, 38 Union, 122 Mauza, 27 Ward, 153 Mahalla and 1,702 Villages. The upazilas are Dighinala, Khagrachhari Sadar, Lakshmichhari, Mahalchhari, Manikchhari, Matiranga, Panchhari, Ramgarh and Guimara.

Deputy Commissioner (DC): Md. Shahiduzzaman

Chairman of Hill District Council: Mr. Kongjari Chowdhury

== Economy ==
Most of the people live on Jhum cultivation. There are also people of various professions like teacher, farmer and businessmen. Tourism is becoming a strong income source for the local.

Main sources of income Agriculture 59.92%, non-agricultural labourer 9.33%, industry 0.44%, commerce 10.67%, transport and communication 1.11%, service 7.94%, construction 0.92%, religious service 0.24%, rent and remittance 0.37% and others 9.06%.

== Education ==
Rate of school going student is 44.07%. There are 18 colleges, 71 high schools, 13 madrasa and different kinds of educational institutions.

Noted educational institutions:

- Khagrachhari Government College (1974)
- Matiranga Degree College (1992)
- Tabalchari Greenhill College (2009)
- Ramgarh Government Degree College (1980)
- Panchhari College (1990)
- Dighinala Government College
- Khagrachhri Cantonment public school and college (2006),
- Panchhari High School and College (1981)
- Khagrachhari Government High School (1957)
- Tabalchhari Kadamtoli High School (1952)
- Matiranga Pailot High school
- Gomti B.K High school
- Santipur High School
- Amtoli High school
- Taindong High School
- Matiranga Girls High School
- Khadachora High School
- Bornal Moktizodha High School
- Matiranga Reacidencial High School
- Ramgarh Government High School (1952)
- Rani Nihar Devi Government High School (1976)
- Dighinala Government High School
- Choto Merung High School (1975)
- Thakurchara High School (1979)
- Khagrachhari North Khobongpodia Government Primary School (1905)

== Archaeological heritage and relics ==
Among the archaeological heritages and relics, Rajbari of the Mong Circle and Dighi (large pond) of Dighinala (excavated by Gobinda Manikya Bahadur exiled king of Tripura) are notable.

== Transport ==
Palanquin, elephant cart, buffalo cart, horse carriage, bullock cart and country boat were the traditional transports once found in the rural area of the zila. These means of transport are either extinct or nearly extinct except country boat. Now-a-days, all the upazilas are connected to the zila headquarters by metalled roads. Bus, minibus, three wheelers, pickup van ply over the zila. Chander Gari (local four wheeled jeep) is a popular transport used to ply in the hill area of the zila.

== Climate ==
Temperature and Rainfall: The annual average temperature of the zila varies from maximum 34.6 °C to minimum 13 °C and the average annual rainfall is 3031 mm.

== Member of Parliament ==
Election	Member	Party
1986	A. K. M. Alim Ullah	Jatiya Party (Ershad)
1988	A. K. M. Alim Ullah	Jatiya Party (Ershad)
1991	Kalparanjan Chakma	Bangladesh Awami League
1996	Kalparanjan Chakma	Bangladesh Awami League
2001	Wadud Bhuiyan	Bangladesh Nationalist Party
2008	Jotindra Lal Tripura	Bangladesh Awami League
2014	Kujendra Lal Tripura	Bangladesh Awami League
2018	Kujendra Lal Tripura	Bangladesh Awami League
2024	Kujendra Lal Tripura	Bangladesh Awami League

== Notable persons ==
- A. K. M. Alim Ullah
- Wadud Bhuiyan
- Kujendra Lal Tripura
- Jotindra Lal Tripura
- Birendra Kishore Roaza
- Kalparanjan Chakma
- Upendra Lal Chakma
- Monika Chakma
- Basanti Chakma
- Supradip Chakma
- Aungmraching Marma
- Anai Mogini
- Anuching Mogini

== See also ==
- Alutila Cave
- Matai Hakor
- Matai Pukhiri
- Tuari Mairang
- Mayung Kopal
- Palashpur
- Districts of Bangladesh
- Tripuri people
- Chakma people
- Marma people
