= Ramgarh Upazila =

Ramgarh রামগড়
- Upazila
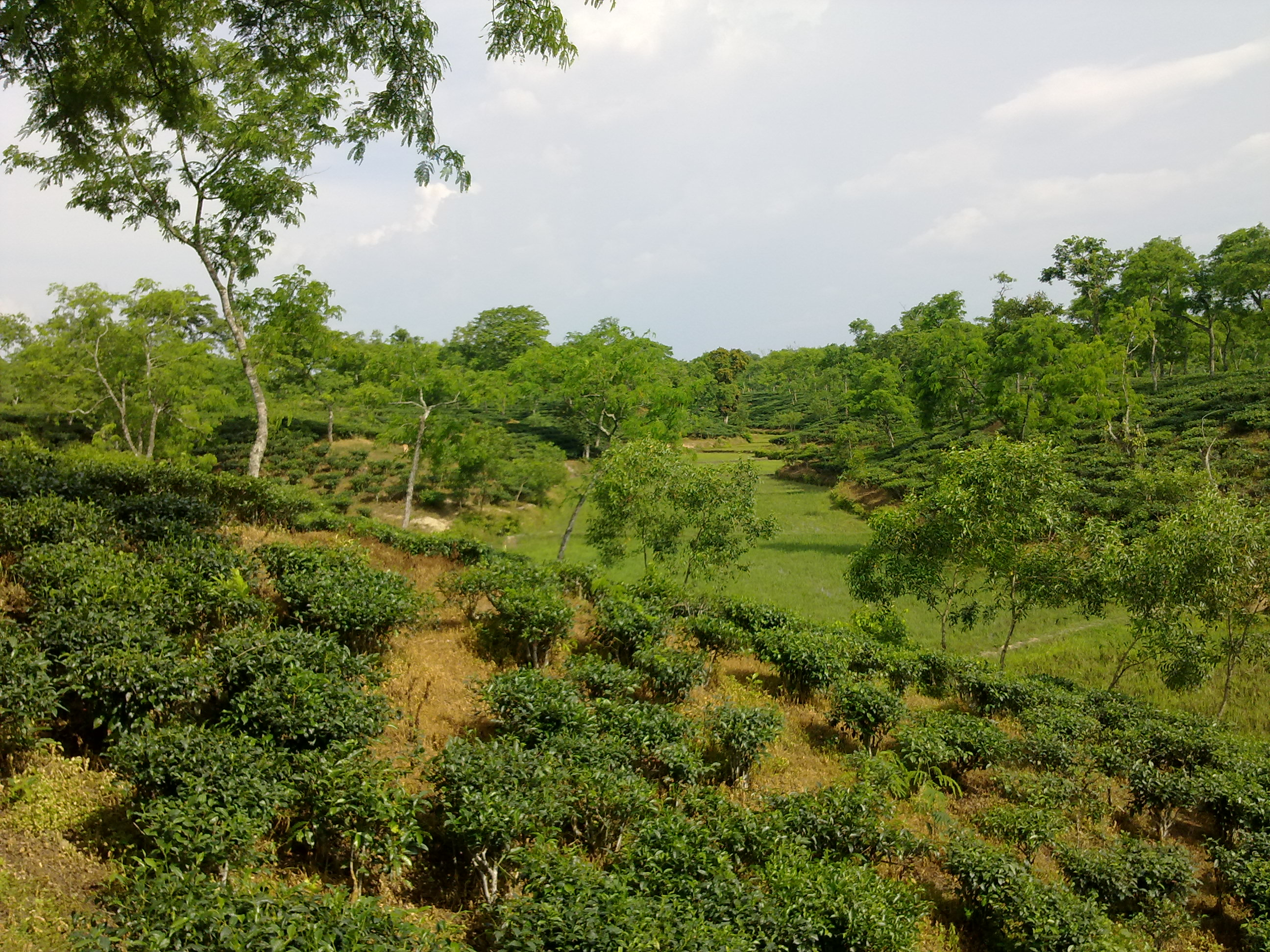
- Ramgarh Tea Garden, Ramgarh

- Coordinates: 22°58′N 91°42′E
- Country: Bangladesh
- Division: Chittagong
- District: Khagrachhari

Area
  - Total: 199.83 km^{2} (77.15 sq mi)

Population (2022)
  - Total: 60,741
  - Density: 303.96/km^{2} (787.26/sq mi)
- Time zone: UTC+6 (BST)
- Postal code: 4440
- Website: Official Map of Ramgarh

Ramgarh Upazila mauza geocode map

Ramgarh (Bengali: রামগড়) is an upazila of Khagrachhari District in Chattogram Division, Bangladesh.

== History ==
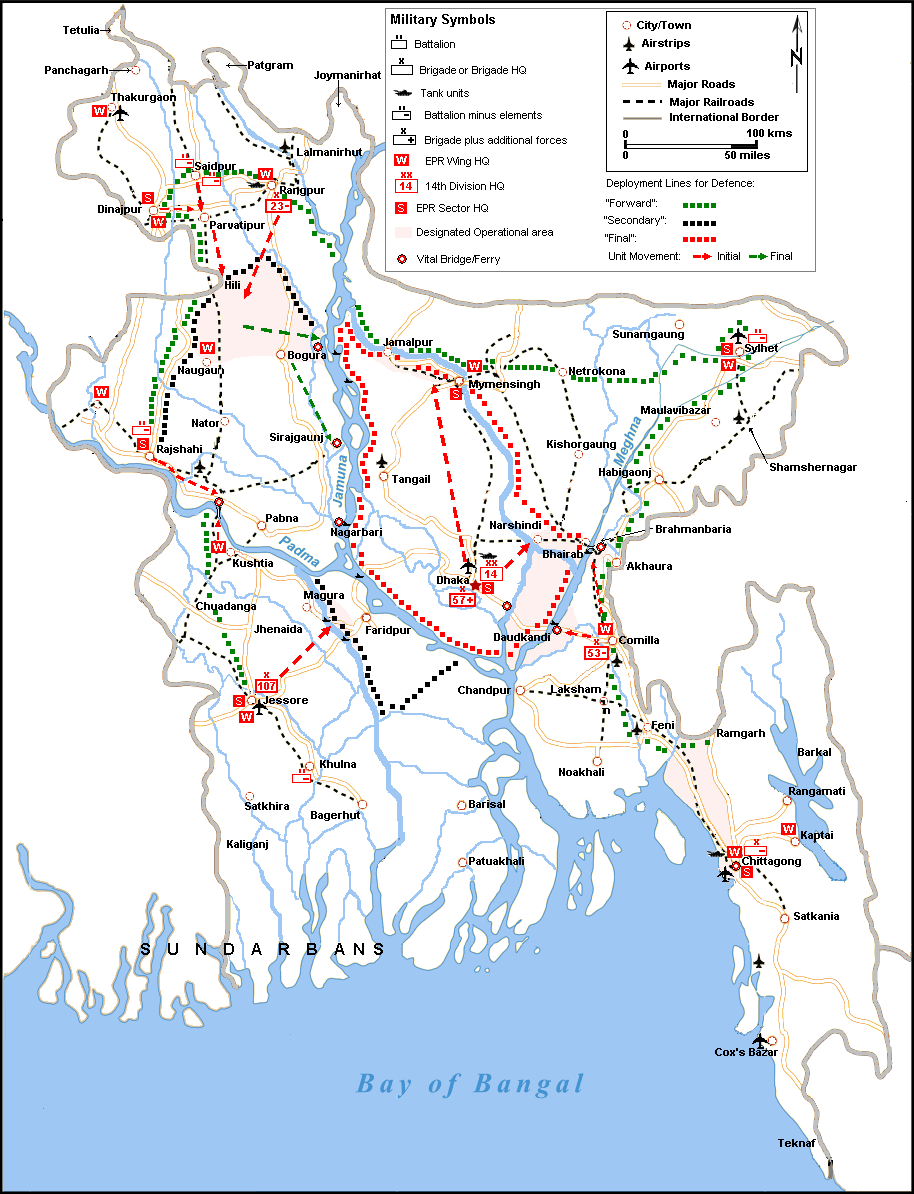
Pakistani Eastern Command plan for the defence of East Pakistan from 1967 to 1971 (generic representation—some unit locations not shown).

This was part of ancient Pundra Kingdom.

During the Indo-Pakistani War of 1971 for the liberation of Bangladesh, when Pakistan Army created the 91st ad hoc brigade as part of the 39th Division to hold on to this area and to defend north of Chittagong, but these ad hoc formations lacked the staff and equipment of regular formations. Pakistan Army's 93,000 troops unconditionally surrendered to the Indian Army and India's local ally Mukti Bahini on 16 December 1971. This day and event is commemorated as the Bijoy Dibos (Bengali: বিজয় দিবস) in Bangladesh and Vijay Diwas in India.

== Geography ==
Ramgarh is located at 22.9667°N 91.7000°E. It has a total area of 199.83 km^{2}.

== Demographics ==
According to the 2022 Bangladeshi census, Ramgarh Upazila had 13,601 households and a population of 60,741. 10.99% of the population were under 5 years of age. Ramgarh had a literacy rate (age 7 and over) of 76.08%: 80.14% for males and 72.09% for females, and a sex ratio of 98.46 males for every 100 females. 45,427 (74.79%) lived in urban areas.

=== Ethnicity and religion ===
Religions in Ramgarh Upazila (2022)
Religion	Percent
Islam	65.48%
Hinduism	19.16%
Buddhism	14.63%
Christianity	0.41%
Other or not stated	0.32%

Population by religion in Union/Paurashava
Union/Paurashava	Muslim	Hindu	Buddhist	Others
Ramgarh Paurashava	20,829	4,793	2,296	287
Patachhara	8,068	4,550	3,729	142
Ramgarh	10,873	2,291	2,862	14

🟩 Muslim majority

As of the 2022 Bangladeshi census, the residual Ramgarh upazila had a population of 60,741. The ethnic population was 16,317 (26.86%), of which Tripura were 8,065, Marma 6,446 and Chakma 1,681.

Ethnicity in Ramgarh (2022)
1. Bengali (73.1%)
2. Tripura (13.3%)
3. Marma (10.6%)
4. Chakma (2.77%)
5. Others (0.20%)

Population by ethnicity in Union/Paurashava
Union/Paurashava	Bengali	Tripura	Chakma	Marma	Others
Ramgarh Paurashava	24,675	1,363	83	1,987	104
Patachhara	8,439	4,558	1,542	1,930	20
Ramgarh	11,310	2,144	56	2,529	1

🟩 Bengali majority

== Administration ==
UNO: Momota Afrin.

Ramgarh Upazila is divided into Ramgarh Municipality and two union parishads: Patachhara Union and Ramgarh Union. The union parishads are subdivided into 6 mauzas and 136 villages.

Ramgarh Municipality is subdivided into 9 wards and 29 mahallas.

== Notable people ==
- AKM Alim Ullah, former MP
- Wadud Bhuiyan, former MP and chairman of Chittagong Hill Tracts Development Board

== See also ==
- Upazilas of Bangladesh
- Districts of Bangladesh
- Divisions of Bangladesh
- Thanas of Bangladesh
