= Tabalchhari Union =

Union of Khagrachhari District, Chittagong, Bangladesh

Tabalchhari তবলছড়ি
- Union
- Interactive map of Tabalchhari
- Country: Bangladesh
- Division: Chittagong Division
- District: Khagrachhari District
- Upazila: Matiranga Upazila

Area
  - Total: 31.08 km^{2} (12.00 sq mi)

Population (2022)
  - Total: 19,963
  - Density: 642.3/km^{2} (1,664/sq mi)
- Time zone: UTC+6 (BST)
- Postal code: 4450
- Website: tabalchariup.khagrachhari.gov.bd

Tabalchhari Union is a union of Matiranga Upazila under Khagrachhari District.

== Demography ==
According to 2022 census, total population of the Union are 19,963. Among them, 17,518 are Muslim, 1,311 are Hindu, 1,120 are Buddhist and 14 are Christian.

Religion-2022
1. Islam (87.8%)
2. Hinduism (6.57%)
3. Buddhism (5.61%)
4. Christianity (0.07%)
5. Others (0.00%)

== Ethnicity ==
This Union is home to a variety of different ethnic groups. Among them, 17,597 are Bengali, 1,256 are Tripura, 707 are Chakma and 403 are Marma.

Ethnicity-2022
1. Bengali (88.2%)
2. Tripura (6.29%)
3. Chakma (3.54%)
4. Marma (2.02%)
5. Others (0.00%)
