= Basanti Chakma =

Bangladeshi politician

- বাসন্তী চাকমা

Member of the Bangladesh Parliament for Reserved Women's Seat-9
- Incumbent
- Assumed office 20 February 2019

Personal details
- Born: 16 May 1971 (age 55)
- Party: Bangladesh Awami League
- Education: B.A (Pass)
- Occupation: Housewife

Basanti Chakma is a Bangladesh Awami League politician and a member of the Bangladesh Parliament from a reserved seat.

== Career ==
Chakma was elected to parliament from reserved seat as a Bangladesh Awami League candidate in 2019.
