= Golabari Union, Khagrachhari =

Union of Khagrachhari District, Chittagong, Bangladesh

Golabari গোলাবাড়ী
- Union
- Interactive map of Golabari
- Country: Bangladesh
- Division: Chittagong Division
- District: Khagrachhari District
- Upazila: Khagrachhari Sadar Upazila

Area
  - Total: 9.32 km^{2} (3.60 sq mi)

Population (2022)
  - Total: 15,177
  - Density: 1,630/km^{2} (4,220/sq mi)
- Time zone: UTC+6 (BST)
- Postal code: 4400
- Website: golabariup.khagrachhari.gov.bd

Golabari Union is a union of Khagrachhari Sadar Upazila under Khagrachhari District.

== Demography ==
According to 2022 census, total population of the Union are 15,177. Among them, 5,869 are Muslim, 4,701 are Buddhist, 4,454 are Hindu and 153 are Christian.

Religion-2022
1. Islam (38.7%)
2. Buddhism (31.0%)
3. Hinduism (29.4%)
4. Christianity (1.01%)
5. Others (0.00%)

== Ethnicity ==
This Union is home to a variety of different ethnic groups. Among them, 6,543 are Bengali, 3,991 are Tripura, 2,905 are Marma, 1,707 are Chakma and 31 are of others ethnic groups.

Ethnicity-2022
1. Bengali (43.1%)
2. Tripura (26.3%)
3. Marma (19.1%)
4. Chakma (11.2%)
5. Others (0.20%)
