= Patachhara Union =

Union of Khagrachhari District, Chittagong, Bangladesh

Patachhara পাতাছড়া
- Union
- Interactive map of Patachhara
- Country: Bangladesh
- Division: Chittagong Division
- District: Khagrachhari District
- Upazila: Ramgarh Upazila

Area
  - Total: 82.88 km^{2} (32.00 sq mi)

Population (2022)
  - Total: 16,489
  - Density: 199.0/km^{2} (515.3/sq mi)
- Time zone: UTC+6 (BST)
- Postal code: 4440
- Website: patacharaup.khagrachhari.gov.bd

Patachhara Union is a union of Ramgarh Upazila under Khagrachhari District.

== Demography ==
According to 2022 census, total population of the Union are 16,489. Among them, 8,068 are Muslim, 4,550 are Hindu, 3,729 are Buddhist, 105 are Christian and 38 follow others religion.

Religion-2022
1. Islam (48.9%)
2. Hinduism (27.6%)
3. Buddhism (22.6%)
4. Christianity (0.64%)
5. Others (0.23%)

== Ethnicity ==
This Union is home to a variety of different ethnic groups. Among them, 8,439 are Bengali, 4,558 are Tripura, 1,930 are Marma, 1,542 are Chakma and 20 are of others ethnic groups.

Ethnicity-2022
1. Bengali (51.2%)
2. Tripura (27.6%)
3. Marma (11.7%)
4. Chakma (9.35%)
5. Others (0.12%)
