= Khagrachhari Sadar Union =

Union of Khagrachhari District, Chittagong, Bangladesh

Khagrachhari Sadar খাগড়াছড়ি সদর
- Union
- Interactive map of Khagrachhari Sadar
- Country: Bangladesh
- Division: Chittagong Division
- District: Khagrachhari District
- Upazila: Khagrachhari Sadar Upazila

Area
  - Total: 31.08 km^{2} (12.00 sq mi)

Population (2022)
  - Total: 10,343
  - Density: 332.8/km^{2} (861.9/sq mi)
- Time zone: UTC+6 (BST)
- Postal code: 4400
- Website: sadarup.khagrachhari.gov.bd

Kagrachhari Sadar Union is a union of Khagrachhari Sadar Upazila under Khagrachhari District.

== Demography ==
According to 2022 census, total population of the Union are 10,343. Among them, 1,202 are Muslim, 5,399 are Buddhist, 3,642 are Hindu and 100 are Christian.

Religion-2022
1. Buddhism (52.2%)
2. Hinduism (35.2%)
3. Islam (11.6%)
4. Christianity (0.97%)
5. Others (0.00%)

== Ethnicity ==
This Union is home to a variety of different ethnic groups. Among them, 1,222 are Bengali, 3,723 are Tripura, 2,718 are Marma, 2,677 are Chakma and 3 are of others ethnic groups.

Ethnicity-2022
1. Tripura (36.0%)
2. Marma (26.3%)
3. Chakma (25.9%)
4. Bengali (11.8%)
5. Others (0.03%)
