= Khagrachhari =

Khagrachhari খাগড়াছড়ি হাগাড়াছড়ি(চাকমা)
- Town and Municipality
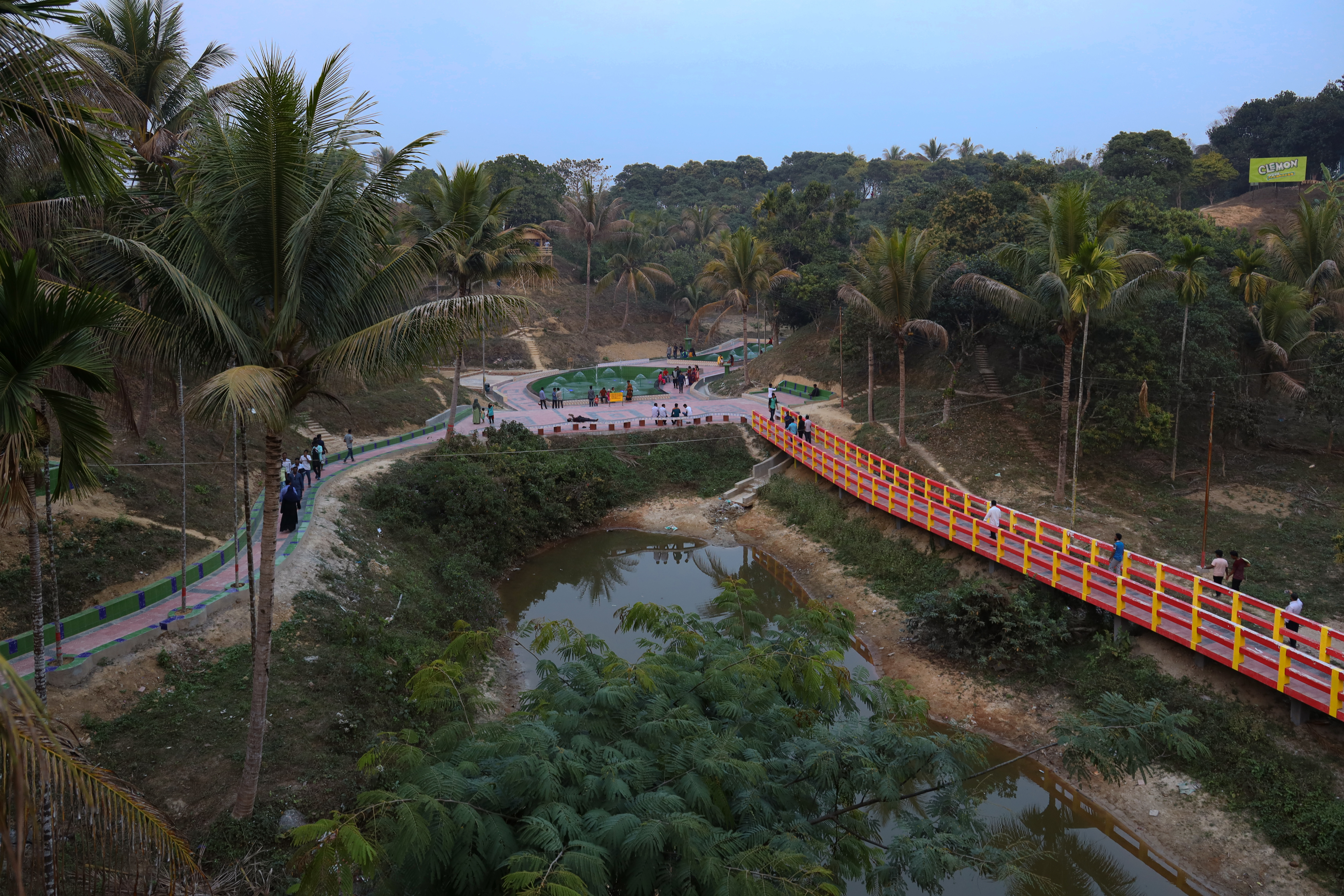
- Khagrachari HDCH Park Lake

- Location in Chittagong division Location in Bangladesh
- Coordinates: 23.106°N 91.979°E
- Division: Chittagong Division
- Region: Chittagong Hill Tracts
- District: Khagrachhari
- Upazila: Khagrachhari Sadar

Government
  - Type: Mayor–Council
  - Body: Khagrachhari Paurashava

Population (2022)
  - Total: 58,875
- Time zone: UTC+6 (Bangladesh Time)
- National Dialing Code: +880

Khagrachhari Municipality mahallah geocode map

Khagrachhari is a city in the Chittagong Hill Tracts of southeastern Bangladesh. It is the headquarters of Khagrachhari District.

== Demographics ==
According to the 2022 Bangladesh census, Khagrachhari city had a population of 58,875.

=== Religion ===
Religions in Khagrachhari town (2022)
Religion	Percent
Islam	58.28%
Buddhism	27.52%
Hinduism	13.48%
Christianity	0.70%
Other or not stated	0.02%

Population by religion in wards under municipality
Ward No	Islam	Buddhism	Hinduism	Others
Ward-1	1,187	4,655	558	28
Ward-2	7,656	654	334	18
Ward-3	5,838	332	1,217	3
Ward-4	2,691	1,390	240	21
Ward-5	3,773	353	1,067	185
Ward-6	8,008	15	502	9
Ward-7	1,461	4,649	1,836	165
Ward-8	1,602	226	373	5
Ward-9	2,345	3,751	1,809	19

=== Ethnicity ===
Ethnicity
1. Bengali (70.0%)
2. Chakma (19.0%)
3. Marma (6.28%)
4. Tripura (4.29%)
5. Others (0.40%)

Population by ethnicity in wards of Municipality
Ward	Bengali	Chakma	Tripura	Marma	Others
Ward-1	1,560	4,308	231	302	27
Ward-2	8,211	547	81	11	12
Ward-3	7,174	97	96	20	3
Ward-4	2,875	1,236	90	127	14
Ward-5	4,055	175	997	29	22
Ward-6	8,506	1	18	4	5
Ward-7	3,119	3,093	528	1,297	74
Ward-8	1,979	7	35	150	35
Ward-9	3,944	1,727	451	1,759	43
