= Matiranga Upazila =

Matiranga মাটিরাঙ্গা
- Upazila
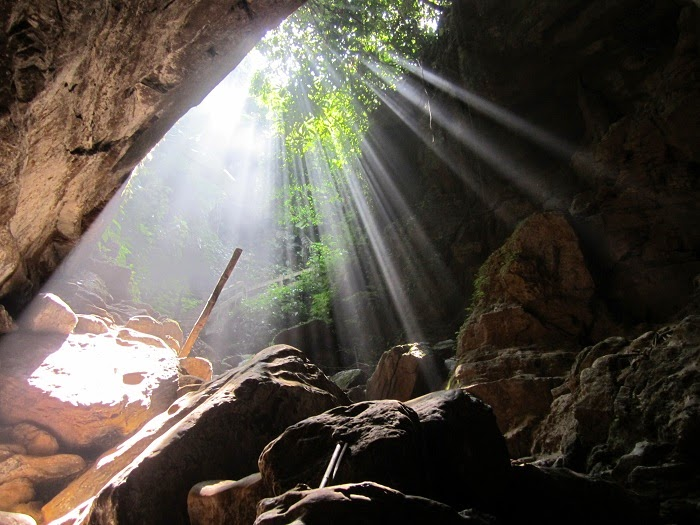
- Alutila cave, Matiranga upazila

- Coordinates: 23°2.5′N 91°52.5′E
- Country: Bangladesh
- Division: Chittagong
- District: Khagrachhari

Area
  - Total: 404.75 km^{2} (156.27 sq mi)

Population (2022)
  - Total: 126,609
  - Density: 312.81/km^{2} (810.17/sq mi)
- Time zone: UTC+6 (BST)
- Postal code: 4450
- Website: Official Map of Matiranga

Matiranga Upazila mauza geocode map

Matiranga (Bengali: মাটিরাঙ্গা) is an upazila of Khagrachari District in the Division of Chittagong, Bangladesh.

== Geography ==
Matiranga is located at 23.0417°N 91.8750°E. It has 24,080 households and a total area of 404.75 km^{2}.

== Demographics ==
According to the 2022 Bangladeshi census, Matiranga Upazila had 29,990 households and a population of 126,609. 11.69% of the population were under 5 years of age. Matiranga had a literacy rate (age 7 and over) of 71.59%: 76.01% for males and 67.35% for females, and a sex ratio of 96.91 males for every 100 females. 32,142 (25.39%) lived in urban areas.

=== Ethnicity and religion ===
Religions in Matiranga Upazila (2022)
Religion	Percent
Islam	73.94%
Hinduism	19.73%
Buddhism	5.58%
Christianity	0.42%
Other or not stated	0.32%

Population by religion in Union/Paurashava
Union/Paurashava	Muslim	Hindu	Buddhist	Others
Matiranga Paurashava	25,326	2,351	1,509	136
Amtali	6,957	2,559	15	95
Baranal	8,591	1,302	1,197	15
Belchhari	11,670	2,224	494	213
Gumti	10,894	2,809	7	206
Matiranga	1,166	11,547	1,020	177
Tabalchhari	17,518	1,311	1,120	14
Taindang	11,492	875	1,705	89

🟩 Muslim majority 🟧 Hindu majority

As of the 2022 Bangladeshi census, the residual Matiranga upazila had a population of 126,609. The ethnic population was 30,257 (23.90%), of which Tripura were 23,647, Chakma 3,950 and Marma 2,621.

Ethnicity in Matiranga (2022)
1. Bengali (76.1%)
2. Tripura (18.7%)
3. Chakma (3.12%)
4. Marma (2.07%)
5. Others (0.03%)

Population by ethnicity in Union/Paurashava
Union/Paurashava	Bengali	Tripura	Chakma	Marma	Others
Matiranga Paurashava	26,863	1,232	922	297	8
Amtali	7,102	2,508	3	12	1
Baranal	8,855	1,151	268	825	6
Belchhari	11,844	2,321	246	171	19
Gumti	11,007	2,901	6	0	2
Matiranga	1,555	11,335	373	644	3
Tabalchhari	17,597	1,256	707	403	0
Taindang	11,524	943	1,425	269	0

🟩 Bengali majority 🟧 Tripura majority

== Administration ==
Matiranga Upazila is divided into Matiranga Municipality and seven union parishads: Amtali, Baranal, Belchhari, Gumti, Matiranga, Tabalchhari and Taindang. The union parishads are subdivided into 27 mauzas and 365 villages.

Matiranga Municipality is subdivided into 9 wards and 53 mahallas.

== See also ==
- Upazilas of Bangladesh
- Districts of Bangladesh
- Divisions of Bangladesh
