= Bandarban (disambiguation) =

Bandarban is a town and the administrative headquarters of Bandarban District in the Chittagong Hill Tracts of Bangladesh.

Bandarban may also refer to:

- Bandarban (Jatiya Sangsad constituency), Constituency of Bangladesh's Jatiya Sangsad
- Bandarban Cantonment, a military cantonment in Chittagong Division
- Bandarban District, district in Chittagong Division, Bangladesh
- Bandarban Golden Temple, a buddhist temple
- Bandarban Hill District Council, administrative unit in Bangladesh
- Bandarban Sadar Upazila, upazila in Chittagong Division, Bangladesh
- Bandarban Union, union in Chittagong Division, Bangladesh
- Bandarban University, a private university in Bandarban, Bangladesh
