= Bandarban Sadar =

Bandarban Sadar may refer to:

- Bandarban Sadar Upazila, an upazila of Bandarban District
- Bandarban Sadar Union, a union of Bandarban Sadar Upazila under Bandarban District
