= Rangamati Hill District Council =

Administrative unit in Bangladesh

- রাঙ্গামাটি পার্বত্য জেলা পরিষদ
- Formation: 6 March 1989; 37 years ago
- Headquarters: RHDC Building, Rangamati Sadar, Bangladesh
- Region served: Rangamati District
- Official language: Bengali
- Chairman: Kajal Talukder
- Chief Executive Officer: Khondkar Mohammad Rizaul Karim
- Parent organization: Ministry of Chittagong Hill Tracts Affairs
- Website: rhdc.gov.bd

Rangamati Hill District Council (Bengali: রাঙ্গামাটি পার্বত্য জেলা পরিষদ) is the autonomous government body responsible for the governance of Rangamati Hill District and nearby areas.

== History ==
Rangamati Hill District Council was established in 1989 along with Bandarban Hill District Council and Khagrachhari Hill District Council through direct elections. Rangamati Hill District Councils can be dismissed and formed by the government and change with changes in the national government. According to the Chittagong Hill Tracts Peace Treaty, the government handed over administrative responsibilities of eight educational institutions to the Rangamati Hill District Council in November 2006. The council was increased to 10 members and reserved three of the seats for non-tribals in November 2014. The bill created a seat in the council for every tribe in the district, with the Chakma people receiving the largest at 4 seats.
