= Bandarban University =

University in Bandarban, Bangladesh

- বান্দরবান বিশ্ববিদ্যালয়
- Other name: BUBBAN
- Motto: A Vision for Transformative Education
- Type: Semi-public research
- Established: February 19, 2019; 7 years ago
- Affiliations: University Grants Commission
- Chancellor: President Mohammed Shahabuddin
- Vice-Chancellor: Professor Dr. Mohammad Mohibullah Siddiquee
- Students: 250+ (2024)
- Location: Sualok, Bandarban, 4600, Bangladesh; 22.1320°N 92.1703°E
- Campus: Urban, 100 acres (40 ha)
- Language: English
- Website: www.bubban.ac.bd

Bandarban University is the first semi-public university in Bandarban district of Bangladesh and the first in the country. It is the first university in Bandarban district. An initiative has been taken to establish a permanent campus on 100 acres of land at Suyalok at the entrance of the district headquarters. A temporary campus has been set up temporarily in the heart of the city of Bandarban.

== History ==
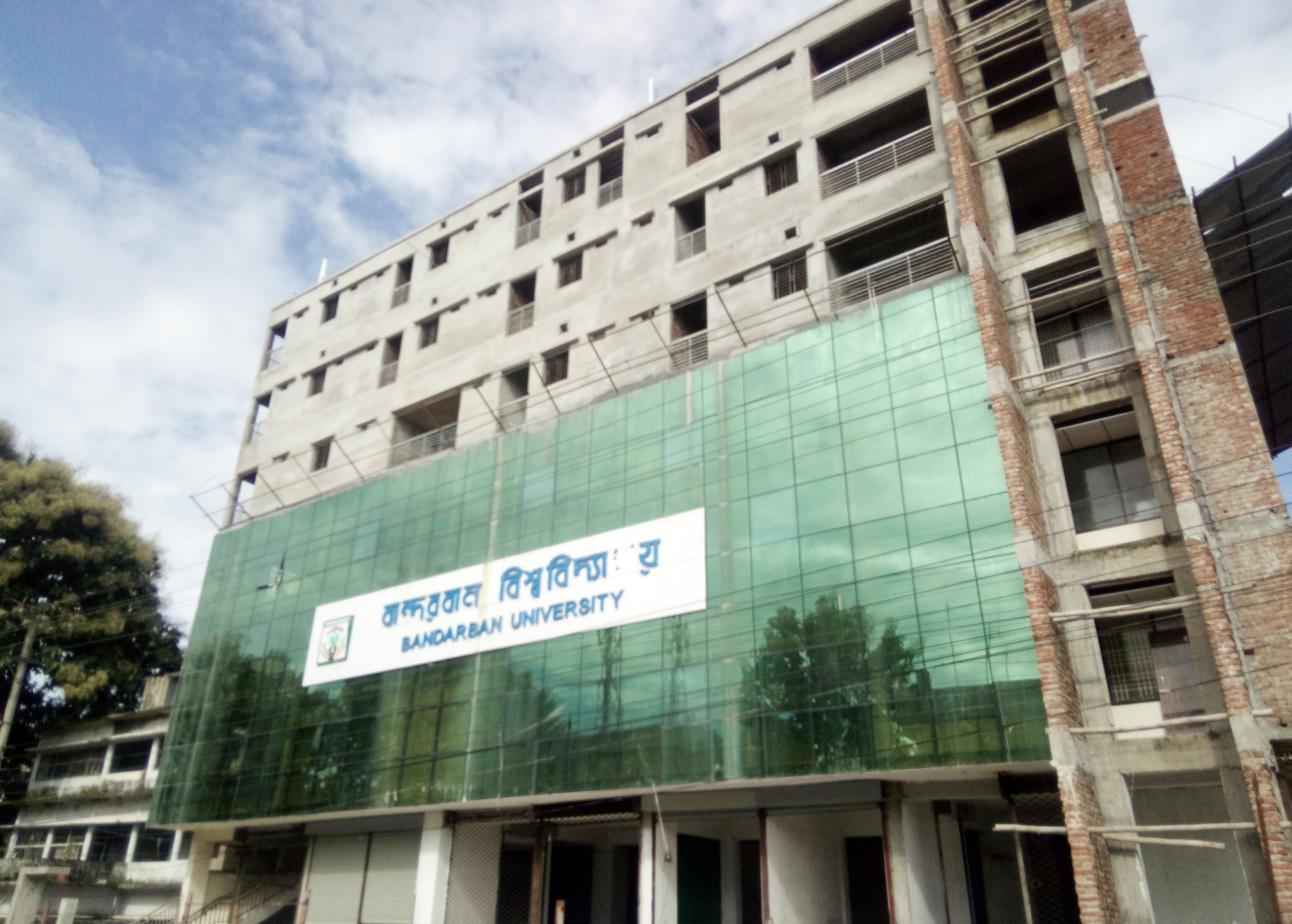
The under-construction campus building in 2018

Ushwe Sing, minister of Chittagong Hill Tracts Affairs took the initiative to establish the university. Several social workers from Bandarban Hill District Council took this initiative forward. Bandarban Education and Development Foundation and Bandarban Hill District Council established this university by investing 75 percent and 25 percent respectively.

On 1 September 2019, the foundation stone of the academic building of Bandarban University was laid in Suyalok Union under the implementation of Chittagong Hill Tracts Development Board. Ushwe Sing inaugurated the laying of the foundation stone of the academic building of the university at a cost of ৳5 crore on the university's own land under the implementation of the Chittagong Hill Tracts Development Board.

== Schools and departments ==
=== School of Science And Technology ===
- Computer Science And Engineering

=== School of Business Studies ===
- Department of Finance
- Department of Accounting & Information System
- Department of Management

=== School of Arts, Social Sciences and Law ===
- Department of English
- Department of Governance and Development Education

== Vice Chancellor ==
1. Professor Dr. Mohammad Mohibullah Siddiquee
