= Task Force on Rehabilitation of India-returnee Refugees and Internally Displaced Persons =

Task Force on Tribal Refugee Affairs
- উপজাতীয় শরণার্থী বিষয়ক টাস্কফোর্স
- Government Seal of Bangladesh
- Formation: 1997; 29 years ago
- Headquarters: Dhaka, Bangladesh
- Region served: Chittagong Hill Tracts
- Official language: Bengali
- Chairman: Sudatta Chakma
- Chief Executive Officer: Krishna Chandra Chakma
- Main organ: Government of Bangladesh
- Parent organization: Ministry of Chittagong Hill Tracts Affairs
- Budget: Allocated by Government
- Website: www.tratf.gov.bd

The Task Force on Rehabilitation of India-returnee Refugees and Internally Displaced Persons (Bengali: ভারত প্রত্যাগত উপজাতীয় শরণার্থী প্রত্যাবাসন ও পুনর্বাসন এবং. অভ্যন্তরীণ উদ্বাস্তু নির্দিষ্টকরণ ও পুনর্বাসন সম্পর্কিত টাস্কফোর্স) is a Bangladesh government task force established to rehabilitate refugees from the Chittagong Hill Tracts conflict following the signing of the Chittagong Hill Tracts Peace Accord.

== History ==
In 1993, the Indian government provided a list of Bangladeshi refugees in India.

The Task Force on Rehabilitation of India-returnee Refugees and Internally Displaced Persons was established in March 1997 following the signing of the Chittagong Hill Tracts Peace Accord and the signing of an agreement between the government of Bangladesh and tribal leaders. The Indian Government also provided an updated list of Bangladeshi refugees in India.

In late 2009, the task force reported 12,223 families with 64,612 family members returned to the Chittagong Hill Tracts following the end of the conflict.

In December 2016, the task force identified an additional 21,900 refugee families returning from India.

In September 2018, the task force created a list of 21,900 refugee families returning from India and 82,000 internally displaced families. The task force forwarded the list to the Ministry of Chittagong Hill Tracts Affairs so that the refugees could be resettled at the expense of the government. The task force had identified 38,000 non-tribal internally displaced people but has placed a proposal for their rehabilitation.

The former chairperson of Kamalchhari Union Parishad criticized the 2018 list for being inaccurate. An anonymous security personnel in Chittagong Hill Tracts claimed that the list contains citizens of India and Myanmar and the task force was colluding with them to destabilize the Chittagong Hill Tracts. Kujendralal Tripura, chairman of the task force, described only the 2009 list as being accurate.

On 22 October 2019, the task force held its 10th meeting at the Chittagong Circuit House. The meeting was presided over by its chairperson and Member of Parliament, Kujendra Lal Tripura. The task force stated that the government has not implemented all the decisions of the taskforce and about 10 thousand refugees were not rehabilitated. The task force forwards land disputes that returning refugees might have to the Chittagong Hill Tracts Land Dispute Resolution Commission. Many of the returning refugees have not been adequately rehabilitated and lack proper housing.
