= Khagrachhari Sadar Upazila =

Khagrachari Sadar খাগড়াছড়ি সদর
- Upazila
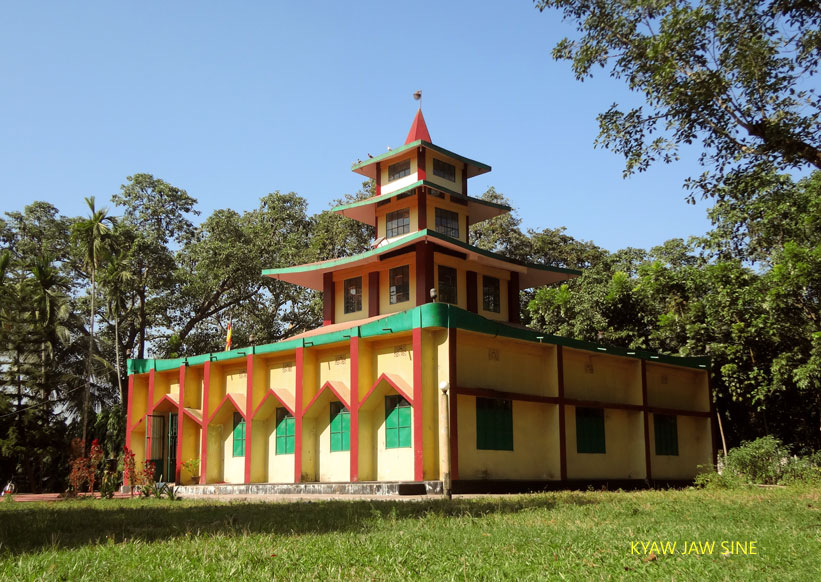
- Youngdaw Buddhist Monastery

- Coordinates: 23°2.5′N 91°59.7′E
- Country: Bangladesh
- Division: Chittagong
- District: Khagrachhari
- Jatiya Sangsad constituency: Khagrachhari
- Headquarters: Khagrachhari Sadar Upazila Complex

Government
  - Body: Upazila Council
  - MP: Kujendra Lal Tripura
  - Chairman: Md. Didarul Alam
  - Executive officer: Naima Islam

Area
  - Total: 297.91 km^{2} (115.02 sq mi)

Population (2022)
  - Total: 136,141
  - Density: 456.99/km^{2} (1,183.6/sq mi)
- Time zone: UTC+6 (BST)
- Postal code: 4400
- Area code: 0371
- Website: sadar.khagrachhari.gov.bd

Khagrachhari Sadar Upazila mauza geocode map

Khagrachari Sadar (Bengali: খাগড়াছড়ি সদর) is an upazila of Khagrachari District in the Division of Chittagong, Bangladesh.

== Geography ==
Khagrachari is located at 23.0417°N 91.9944°E. It has 24,316 households and total area 297.92 km^{2}.

== Demographics ==
According to the 2022 Bangladeshi census, Khagrachhari Sadar Upazila had 32,531 households and a population of 136,141. 9.18% of the population were under 5 years of age. Khagrachhari Sadar had a literacy rate (age 7 and over) of 77.36%: 82.39% for males and 72.17% for females, and a sex ratio of 103.07 males for every 100 females. 72,246 (53.07%) lived in urban areas.

=== Ethnicity and religion ===
Religions in Khagrachhari Sadar Upazila (2022)
Religion	Percent
Buddhism	38.50%
Islam	34.98%
Hinduism	24.76%
Christianity	1.75%
Other or not stated	0.01%

Population by religion in Union/Paurashava
Union/Paurashava	Muslim	Buddhist	Hindu	Others
Khagrachhari	34,561	15,925	7,936	453
Bhaibonchhara	1,491	10,180	10,640	212
Golabari	5,869	4,701	4,454	73
Kamalchhari	4,204	10,020	1,158	293
Sadar	1,202	5,399	3,642	61
Perachhara	286	6,187	5,883	344

🟩 Muslim majority 🟨 Buddhist majority 🟧 Hindu majority

The ethnic population was 80,636 (59.23%), of which Chakma were 36,937, Tripura 28,576 and Marma 14,792.

Ethnicity in Khagrachhari (2022)
1. Bengali (40.8%)
2. Chakma (27.1%)
3. Tripura (21.0%)
4. Marma (10.9%)
5. Others (0.24%)

Population by ethnicity in Union/Paurashava
Union/Paurashava	Bengali	Chakma	Tripura	Marma	Others
Khagrachhari Paurashava	41,223	11,191	2,527	3,699	235
Bhaibonchhara	1,846	8,469	10,713	1,695	13
Golabari	6,543	1,707	3,991	2,905	31
Kamalchhari	4,285	7,603	1,184	2,887	20
Sadar	1,222	2,677	3,723	2,718	3
Perachhara	379	5,290	6,438	888	29

🟩 Bengali majority 🟨 Chakma majority 🟧 Tripura majority

== Administration ==
Khagrachhari Sadar Upazila is divided into Khagrachhari Municipality and five union parishads: Bhaibonchhara, Golabari, Kamalchhari, Khagrachhari and Perachhara. The union parishads are subdivided into 13 mauzas and 246 villages.

Khagrachhari Municipality is subdivided into 9 wards and 73 mahallas.

There are two government middle schools and one government college (high school) in Kharachari upazila.

== See also ==
- Upazilas of Bangladesh
- Districts of Bangladesh
- Divisions of Bangladesh
