= A. K. M. Alim Ullah =

Bangladeshi politician

AKM Alim Ullah
- এ কে মুহম্মদ আলীম উল্লাহ
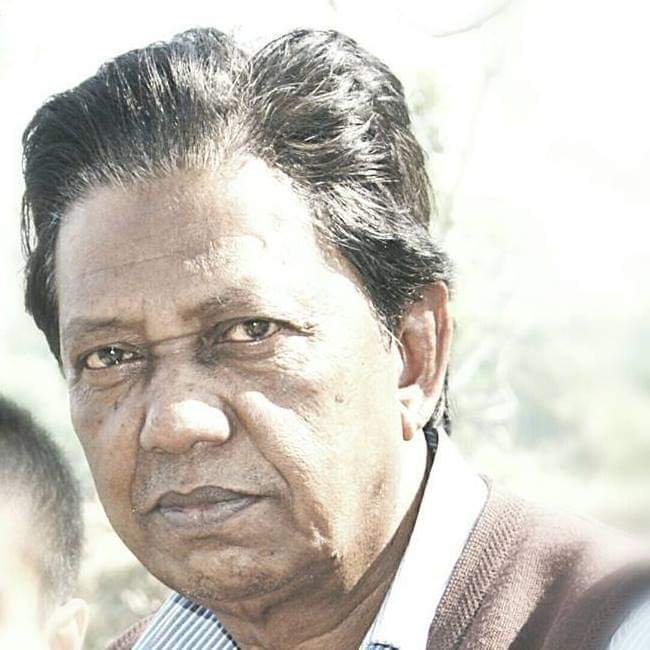

Member of Parliament
- In office 7 May 1986 – 6 December 1990
- Preceded by: Upendra Lal Chakma
- Succeeded by: Kalparanjan Chakma
- Constituency: Khagrachhari

Personal details
- Born: 25 January 1955 (age 71) Ramgarh, Hill Tracts, East Bengal
- Party: Bangladesh Awami League (from 2002)
- Other political affiliations: Jatiya Party (Ershad) (until 2002)

A. K. Mohammad Alim Ullah (Bengali: মুহম্মদ আলীম উল্লাহ; born 25 January 1955) is a Bangladeshi politician. He was elected as a member of parliament twice from Khagrachhari.

== Early life and family ==
AK Mohammad Alim Ullah was born on 25 January 1955 to a Bengali Muslim family in Ramgarh, Khagrachhari, then located under the Hill Tracts of East Bengal in the Dominion of Pakistan. He is married and has three sons.

== Career ==
In 1985, Alim Ullah was elected chairman of Ramgarh Upazila in the first Upazila Parishad elections. He was elected as a member of the 3rd Jatiya Sangsad from Khagrachhari as a Jatiya Party candidate in the 1986 Bangladeshi general election. He was re-elected following the 1988 Bangladeshi general election.

He left the Jatiya Party and joined the Awami League in 2002. Alim Ullah is currently the advisor of the Khagrachhari district Awami League branch and a member of the Khagrachhari district executive committee.
