= Perachhara Union =

Union of Khagrachhari District, Chittagong, Bangladesh

Patachhara পেরাছড়া
- Union
- Interactive map of Patachhara
- Country: Bangladesh
- Division: Chittagong Division
- District: Khagrachhari District
- Upazila: Khagrachhari Sadar Upazila

Area
  - Total: 40.93 km^{2} (15.80 sq mi)

Population (2022)
  - Total: 13,024
  - Density: 318.2/km^{2} (824.1/sq mi)
- Time zone: UTC+6 (BST)
- Postal code: 4400
- Website: paracharaup.khagrachhari.gov.bd

Perachhara Union is a union of Khagrachhari Sadar Upazila under Khagrachhari District.

== Demography ==
According to 2022 census, total population of the Union are 13,024. Among them, 286 are Muslim, 6,187 are Buddhist, 5,883 are Hindu and 668 are Christian.

Religion-2022
1. Buddhism (47.5%)
2. Hinduism (45.2%)
3. Christianity (5.13%)
4. Islam (2.20%)
5. Others (0.00%)

== Ethnicity ==
This Union is home to a variety of different ethnic groups. Among them, 379 are Bengali, 6,438 are Tripura, 5,290 are Chakma, 888 are Marma and 29 are of others ethnic groups.

Ethnicity-2022
1. Tripura (49.4%)
2. Chakma (40.6%)
3. Marma (6.82%)
4. Bengali (2.91%)
5. Others (0.20%)
