= Kujendra Lal Tripura =

Bangladeshi politician

- কুজেন্দ্র লাল ত্রিপুরা
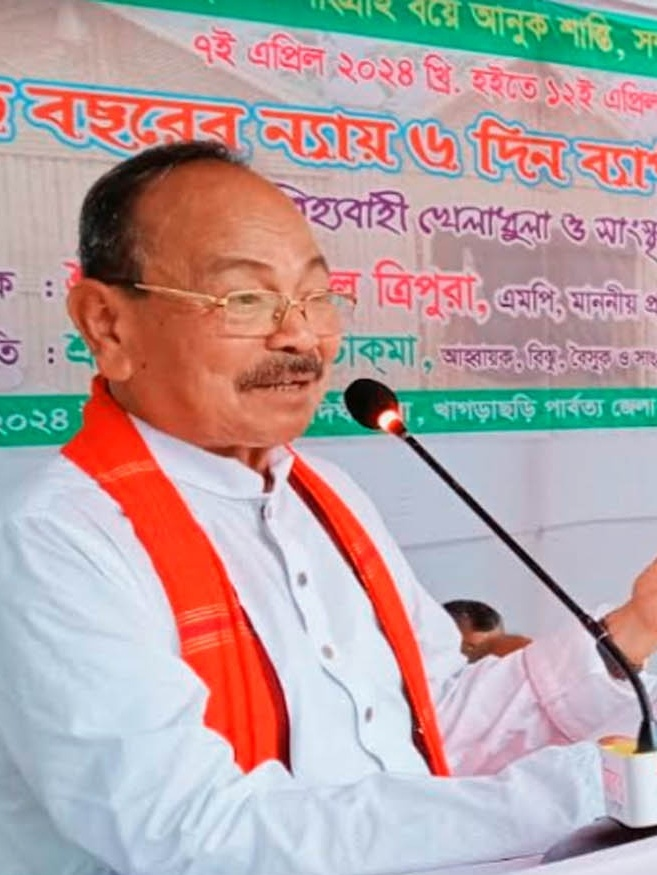
- Kujendra Lal Tripura in 2024.

Minister of State for Chittagong Hill Tracts Affairs
- In office 11 January 2024 – 6 August 2024
- Prime Minister: Sheikh Hasina
- Preceded by: Bir Bahadur Ushwe Sing
- Succeeded by: Mir Mohammed Helal Uddin

Member of Parliament
- In office 29 January 2014 – 6 August 2024
- Preceded by: Jotindra Lal Tripura
- Succeeded by: Wadud Bhuiyan
- Constituency: Khagrachari

Personal details
- Born: 4 November 1963 (age 62) Khagrachhari, East Pakistan, Pakistan
- Party: Bangladesh Awami League
- Spouse: Mallika Tipura

Kujendra Lal Tripura (born 4 November 1963) is a Bangladeshi Awami League politician and a former Jatiya Sangsad member representing the Khagrachhari District constituency. He is the chairman of the Taskforce on Tribal Refugees. He served as Minister of Chittagong Hill Tracts Affairs.

== Early life ==
Tripura was born 4 November 1963 in Khagrachari District. He has a B.A. degree. He is from Tipra/Tripuri community which is known Tripura in Bangladesh.

== Career ==
Tripura was elected to parliament from Khagrachhari District in 2014 as a Bangladesh Awami League candidate. On 8 February 2018 he was made the chairman of the Taskforce on Rehabilitation of Returnee Refugees and Internally Displaced Persons. The post chairman which is the held power of The State Minister on that affair. Before that he served as "chairman" of Khagrachhari Hill District Council from 2010 to 2013.

Tripura inaugurated the rally of The traditional Sangrain Festival of the Marma community in Khagrachari in 2017. Boisu Programme-2022 by Tipra Community inaugurated by Kujendra Lal Tripura in Khagrachari. Tripura donated 10lac taka to 58 Temples for Durga Puja. He inaugurated Three Day Raj Punah by Mong Circle in Khagrachari. Five SAFF champion indigenous girls receive grand reception in Khagrachari by Kujendra Lal Tripura.

Tripura was appointed as Minister of Chittagong Hill Tracts Affairs on 11 January 2024.
