= Rajbila Union =

Union of Bandarban District, Chittagong, Bangladesh

Rajbila রাজবিলা
- Union
- Interactive map of Rajbila
- Country: Bangladesh
- Division: Chittagong Division
- District: Bandarban District
- Upazila: Bandarban Sadar Upazila

Area
  - Total: 101.81 km^{2} (39.31 sq mi)

Population (2022)
  - Total: 6,460
  - Density: 63.5/km^{2} (164/sq mi)
- Time zone: UTC+6 (BST)
- Postal code: 4600
- Website: rajbilaup.bandarban.gov.bd

Rajbila Union is a union of Bandarban Sadar Upazila under Bandarban District.

== Demography ==
According to 2022 census, total population of the Union are 6,460. Among them, 1,825 are Muslim, 4,481 are Buddhist, 117 are Christian and 37 are Hindu.

Religion-2022
1. Buddhism (69.4%)
2. Islam (28.2%)
3. Christianity (1.81%)
4. Hinduism (0.57%)

== Ethnicity ==
This Union is home to a variety of different ethnic groups. Among them, 1,890 are Bengali, 3,655 are Marma, 110 are Tripura, 18 are Mru and 787 are of others ethnic groups.

Ethnicity-2022
1. Marma (56.6%)
2. Bengali (29.3%)
3. Tripura (1.70%)
4. Mru (0.28%)
5. Others (12.2%)
