= Ministry of Chittagong Hill Tracts Affairs =

Government ministry of Bangladesh

- Bengali: পার্বত্য চট্টগ্রাম বিষয়ক মন্ত্রণালয়
- Government Seal of Bangladesh

Ministry overview
- Formed: 15 July 1998; 28 years ago
- Jurisdiction: Government of Bangladesh
- Headquarters: Bangladesh Secretariat, Dhaka
- Annual budget: ৳1457 crore (US$120 million) (2026-2027)
- Minister responsible: Sa Ching Prue Jerry
- Minister of State responsible: Mir Mohammed Helal Uddin
- Ministry executive: AKM Shamimul Haque Siddiqui, Secretary
- Child agencies: Chittagong Hill Tracts Development Board; Refugee Rehabilitation Task Force; Khagrachhari Hill District Council; Rangamati Hill District Council; Bandarban Hill District Council
- Website: mochta.gov.bd

The Ministry of Chittagong Hill Tracts Affairs (Bengali: পার্বত্য চট্টগ্রাম বিষয়ক মন্ত্রণালয়; Pārbatya caṭṭagrāma biṣaẏaka mantraṇālaẏa) is a ministry of the Government of Bangladesh responsible for coordinating development, administration, and governance in the Chittagong Hill Tracts region.

The Chittagong Hill Tracts have been inhabited by various ethnic groups and non-tribal people for ages. While the non-Bengali ethnic groups possess cultural distinctiveness, they are also an integral part of the original population. Since independence, the government of Bangladesh has been adopting and implementing various development projects for the overall development of the region. An agreement was executed on December 2, 1997 between the National Committee for Chittagong Hill Tracts and the Chittagong Hill Tracts People's Association. According to the terms of the agreement, the Ministry of Chittagong Hill Tracts Affairs was formed on July 15, 1998.

== History ==
In 2004, Prime Minister Khaleda Zia restricted the amount of discretionary cash allocated to Deputy Moni Swapan Dewan for spending. The government also allocated rice, 28,000 tons for Bengalis, 10,000 tons for the Bangladesh Army, and 2,100 tons for former rebels in the Chittagong Hill Tracts.

== Directorates ==
- Chittagong Hill Tracts Development Board
- Refugee Rehabilitation Task Force
- Khagrachhari Hill District Council
- Chittagong Hill Tracts Regional Council
- Bandarban Hill District Council
- Rangamati Hill District Council

== Ministers ==
Caretaker minister

Portrait	Minister (Birth-Death) Constituency	Term of office			Political party	Ministry	Prime Minister
Portrait	Minister (Birth-Death) Constituency	From	To	Period	Political party	Ministry	Prime Minister
	Kalparanjan Chakma কল্পরঞ্জন চাকমা (1922–2018); MP for Khagrachhari	15 July 1998	15 July 2001	3 years, 0 days	Bangladesh Awami League	Hasina I	Sheikh Hasina
	Justice; Latifur Rahman বিচারপতি লতিফুর রহমান (1936–2017) (Chief Adviser)	15 July 2001	10 October 2001	87 days	Independent	Latifur	Self
	Khaleda Zia খালেদা জিয়া (1946-2025); MP for Bogra-6 (Prime Minister)	10 October 2001	29 October 2006	5 years, 19 days	Bangladesh Nationalist Party	Khaleda III	Self
	Moni Swapan Dewan মনি স্বপন দেওয়ান (born 1954); MP for Rangamati (Deputy Minister)	10 October 2001	29 October 2006	5 years, 19 days	Bangladesh Nationalist Party	Khaleda III	Khaleda Zia
	Lieutenant General (Retd.); Hasan Mashhud Chowdhury লেফটেন্যান্ট জেনারেল (অবসরপ্রাপ্ত) হাসান মাশহুদ চৌধুরী (born 1948) (Adviser)	29 October 2006	11 January 2007	74 days	Independent	Iajuddin	Iajuddin Ahmed
	Iftekhar Ahmed Chowdhury ইফতেখার আহমেদ চৌধুরী (born 1946) (Adviser)	11 January 2007	8 January 2008	362 days	Independent	Fakhruddin	Fakhruddin Ahmed
	Fakhruddin Ahmed ফখরুদ্দিন আহমেদ (born 1940) (Chief Adviser)	8 January 2008	6 January 2009	364 days	Independent	Fakhruddin	Fakhruddin Ahmed
	Dipankar Talukdar দীপঙ্কর তালুকদার (born 1952); MP for Rangamati (State Minister)	6 January 2009	12 January 2014	5 years, 6 days	Bangladesh Awami League	Hasina II	Sheikh Hasina
	Bir Bahadur Ushwe Sing বীর বাহাদুর উশওয়ে সিং (born 1960); MP for Bandarban (State Minister until 2019)	12 January 2014	11 January 2024	9 years, 364 days	Bangladesh Awami League	Hasina III	Sheikh Hasina
	Bir Bahadur Ushwe Sing বীর বাহাদুর উশওয়ে সিং (born 1960); MP for Bandarban (State Minister until 2019)	12 January 2014	11 January 2024	9 years, 364 days	Bangladesh Awami League	Hasina IV	Sheikh Hasina
	Kujendra Lal Tripura কুজেন্দ্র লাল ত্রিপুরা (born 1963); MP for Khagrachhari (State Minister)	11 January 2024	5 August 2024	207 days	Bangladesh Awami League	Hasina V	Sheikh Hasina
	Supradip Chakma সুপ্রদীপ চাকমা (born 1961) (Adviser)	11 August 2024	17 February 2026	1 year, 190 days	Independent	Yunus	Muhammad Yunus
	Dipen Dewan দীপেন দেওয়ান (born 1963); MP for Rangamati	17 February 2026	1 June 2026	104 days	Bangladesh Nationalist Party	Tarique	Tarique Rahman
	Sa Ching Prue Jerry সা চিং প্রু জেরি (born 1953); MP for Bandarban	21 August 2026	Incumbent	59 days	Bangladesh Nationalist Party	Tarique	Tarique Rahman

== State Ministers ==
Portrait	Minister (Birth-Death) Constituency	Term of office			Political party	Ministry	Prime Minister
Portrait	Minister (Birth-Death) Constituency	From	To	Period	Political party	Ministry	Prime Minister
	Mir Mohammed Helal Uddin মীর মোহাম্মদ হেলাল উদ্দিন (born 1982); MP for Chittagong-5	17 February 2026	Incumbent	244 days	Bangladesh Nationalist Party	Tarique	Tarique Rahman
