= Bhaibonchhara Union =

Union of Khagrachhari District, Chittagong, Bangladesh

Bhaibonchhara ভাইবোনছড়া
- Union
- Interactive map of Bhaibonchhara
- Country: Bangladesh
- Division: Chittagong Division
- District: Khagrachhari District
- Upazila: Khagrachhari Sadar Upazila

Area
  - Total: 108.78 km^{2} (42.00 sq mi)

Population (2022)
  - Total: 22,736
  - Density: 209.01/km^{2} (541.33/sq mi)
- Time zone: UTC+6 (BST)
- Postal code: 4400
- Website: bhaiboncharaup.khagrachhari.gov.bd

Bhaibonchhara Union is a union of Khagrachhari Sadar Upazila under Khagrachhari District.

== Demography ==
According to 2022 census, total population of the Union are 22,736. Among them, 1,491 are Muslim, 10,640 are Hindu, 10,180 are Buddhist and 425 are Christian.

Religion-2022
1. Hinduism (46.8%)
2. Buddhism (44.8%)
3. Islam (6.56%)
4. Christianity (1.87%)
5. Others (0.00%)

== Ethnicity ==
This Union is home to a variety of different ethnic groups. Among them, 1,846 are Bengali, 10,713 are Tripura, 8,469 are Chakma, 1,695 are Marma and 13 are of others ethnic groups.

Ethnicity-2022
1. Tripura (47.1%)
2. Chakma (37.2%)
3. Bengali (8.12%)
4. Marma (7.45%)
5. Others (0.06%)
