= Wadud Bhuiyan =

Bangladeshi politician

Abdul Wadud Bhuiyan
- আবদুল ওয়াদুদ ভূইয়া

Member of Parliament
- Incumbent
- Assumed office 17 February 2026
- Preceded by: Kujendra Lal Tripura
- Constituency: Khagrachari
- In office 10 October 2001 – 29 October 2006
- Preceded by: Kalparanjan Chakma
- Succeeded by: Jotindra Lal Tripura
- Constituency: Khagrachari
- In office 25 February 1996 – 30 March 1996
- Preceded by: Kalparanjan Chakma
- Succeeded by: Kalparanjan Chakma
- Constituency: Khagrachari

Chairman of Chittagong Hill Tracts Development Board
- In office 13 February 2002 – 22 November 2006
- Preceded by: Taracharan Chakma (In Charge)
- Succeeded by: Md. Feroz Kibria (In Charge)

Personal details
- Born: 5 January 1965 (age 61) Ramgarh, Hill Tracts, East Pakistan
- Party: Bangladesh Nationalist Party
- Spouse: Zakia Zinat Bithi
- Education: University of Chittagong (MSS)

Abdul Wadud Bhuiyan (born 5 January 1965) is a Bangladeshi politician. Bhuiyan was elected as the member of the Jatiya Sangsad from the Khagrachari constituency in the 6th, 8th and 13th National Parliamentary Elections respectively. In addition, he served as chairman of the Chittagong Hill Tracts Development Board from 2002 to 2006. He currently holds the posts of assistant employment secretary of the Central Executive Committee of the Bangladesh Nationalist Party (BNP) and president of the opposition party's Khagrachari local unit as well.

== Early life and education ==
Bhuiyan was born on 5 January 1965 in Ramgarh, Khagrachhari, which was then a part of the Hill Tracts district of East Pakistan. He belongs to a landed Bengali family of Muslim Bhuiyans allegedly descended from Shamsher Gazi of Roshanabad. His father, Alhaj Saleh Ahmad Bhuiyan, was a businessman and philanthropist while his grandfather, Alhaj Abdul Majid Bhuiyan, was a politically influential taluqdar.

Bhuiyan began his initial studies under his mother, learning Bengali, Arabic, Urdu, English and the Sipara. He also developed a proficiency in the local Chakma dialect. Bhuiyan then studied at the Ramgarh Government Primary School. He obtained his Master of Social Science degree in sociology from the University of Chittagong in 1986.

== Career ==
=== Student politics ===
Bhuiyan was active in student politics at Chittagong University. He was the convener, which was equivalent to the post of president, of the Chittagong University unit of Jatiyatabadi Chhatra Dal, the student wing of BNP, from 1987 to 1989. Concurrently, he served as the president of the Ramgarh unit of the student organization from 1980 to 1990.

=== Public office ===
In 1989, Bhuiyan was elected as the counselor of the Khagrachari Hill District Council with a majority of few thousands votes. He later resigned, along with another counselor, from the post, protesting the then-chairman Samiran Dewan's alleged corruption.

Bhuiyan had also participated in the 5th (1991) and 7th (1996) parliamentary elections as the sole candidate of BNP, only to have been defeated by comparatively close margins.

In the 6th parliamentary election, in 1996, he was nominated and elected as the candidate of the Bangladesh Nationalist Party (BNP) from Khagrachari constituency. In 1997, he filed a petition with the high court challenging the reservation of post of chairperson of the Chittagong Hill Tracts District Councils for indigenous people.

In the 9th parliamentary election, in 2001, Bhuiyan was again nominated as the candidate of the BNP and elected by a significant margin. It was alleged that militant Bengali settlers intimidated tribal voters, which led to his "shock" victory. During his term, Khagrachari saw expansion of Bengali settlements called cluster villages, including beside Sajek road. His former bodyguard, Mohammad Joynal Abedin, was elected mayor of Khagrachari in 2004. He filed 19 defamation cases against Matiur Rahman, editor of Prothom Alo, its publisher, and reporter. As vhairman of the Chittagong Hill Tracts Development Board, he was biased towards Bengali settlers.

Parbattya Chattagram Jano Sanghati Samity raised allegations of corruption against Bhuiyan in 2008. Bhuiyan's political protégé, Mohammad Selim, received government contracts in Khagrachari through his influence. His aid and Village Defense Party member, Mohammad Abdus Salam illegally occupied land and built homes worth 40 million BDT. Another aide, Joynal Abedin, was an advisor of the Parbattya Chattagram Samo Adhiker Andolon.

In 2001, he was appointed as a member of the parliamentary standing committee on Ministry of Chittagong Hill Tracts Affairs, with BNP chairperson and Prime Minister Khaleda Zia heading the committee.

In 2002, he was appointed as the chairman of the Chittagong Hill Tracts Development Board, a government agency established in 1978 by Ziaur Rahman, the founder of the BNP and then-President of Bangladesh.

In the 10th parliamentary election, he couldn't participate due to his imprisonment during the military influenced then-caretaker government's period for misappropriating public funds. In the last parliamentary election held in 2018, his candidacy was revoked by the Bangladesh Election Commission and then confirmed by the Bangladesh High Court as well after he filed an appeal. In December 2018, he was injured in an attack by Awami League activists while campaigning for Shahidul Islam Bhuiyan Farhad, candidate of the Jatiya Oikya Front.

=== Political activism ===
Bhuiyan is known as the leader of the people with Bengali lineage living in the Chittagong Hill Tracts. He was also known for his vocal opposition to the militant activities of Shanti Bahini, the rebellious military wing of the Parbatya Chattagram Jana Sanghati Samiti (PCJSS) that operated until the Chittagong Hill Tracts Peace Accord was signed between the Bangladesh government and the PCJSS in 1997.

Bhuiyan was the architect behind the foundation of Parbatya Chattagram Sama-Odhikar Andolon (Chittagong Hill Tracts Equal-Rights Movement), an organization that demanded an equal share for Bengali in any dispensation intended for ethnic people. It is opposed to the Chittagong Hill Tracts Peace Accord. In 2004, it attacked the motorcade of Dr Kamal Hossain, leader of the Gono Forum, while he was on his way to Rangamati to attend a meeting of the Jonosanghoti Samity. While Prime Minister Khaleda Zia assured Kamal Hossain of a proper investigation, the Home Minister Altaf Hossain Chowdhury blamed it on Kamal Hossain and his supporters. A case was filed against Bhuiyan over the attack. Syed Badrul Ahsan held Bhuiyan as one of the people responsible for tensions in the hill tracts.

== Arrests ==
Bhuiyan was also arrested during the caretaker government's period on 4 February 2007 from Baithak, his house in Khagrachar which was later seized by Bangladesh Police. The Anti-Corruption Commission and the National Board of Revenue seized his imported BMW, worth 30 million BDT, from the home of Mohammad Mahfuz, his friend and Bangladesh Nationalist Party politician. His assets were frozen in May 2007 on court orders. A special court in Chittagong sentenced him to 20 years in jail. He worked as a gardener in jail. However, this conviction order, along with seven orders, was later stayed by the High Court, and he was granted bail for six months. He had 20 criminal cases filed against him.
