= Chittagong Hill Tracts Land Dispute Resolution Commission =

Bangladeshi government commission

- Formation: 1999
- Headquarters: Dhaka, Bangladesh
- Region served: Bangladesh
- Official language: Bengali

Chittagong Hill Tracts Land Dispute Resolution Commission (Bengali: পার্বত্য চট্টগ্রাম ভূমি বিরোধ নিষ্পত্তি কমিশন) is a Bangladesh government commission formed to solve disputes in the Chittagong Hill Tracts. The commission formed in 1999 has been unable to work due to the lack of rules under which the commission can operate.

== History ==
Chittagong Hill Tracts Land Dispute Resolution Commission was established in 1999 as in line with the Chittagong Hill Tracts Peace Accord signed in 1997 between the Government of Bangladesh and the Parbatya Chattogram Jana Samhati Samiti. The government enacted the CHT Land Dispute Resolution Commission Act in 2001. The act stipulated that the decisions of the court would be like verdicts of a civil court and cannot be challenged anywhere. The act called for the government to provide a set of rules for the commission to act under and as of 2019 the government has not done so. The government had also amended the act in 2013 that reduced the power of the Commissioner of the Chittagong Hill Tracts Land Dispute Resolution Commission and removed the requirement to establish rules for the commission within six months of the passage of the CHT Land Dispute Resolution Commission Act in 2001. There are 23 thousand cases pending with the commission.

The commission is headed by a retired judge of the Bangladesh Supreme Court. Despite the large number of cases the commission has provided no decisions on those land disputes due to the lack of rules. The first meeting of the commission was held on 12 February 2018 in Rangamati Circuit House. The meeting was chaired by Justice Muhammad Anwarul Haq. On 23 December 2019, protesters from Parbatya Chattogram Nagorik Parishad, surrounded the Rangamati Hill District Council demanding amendments to the commission act.
