= Kalparanjan Chakma =

Bangladeshi politician (1922–2018)

- কল্পরঞ্জন চাকমা

Minister for Chittagong Hill Tracts Affairs
- In office 1 January 1998 – 15 July 2001
- Prime Minister: Sheikh Hasina
- Preceded by: Position established
- Succeeded by: Bir Bahadur Ushwe Sing

Member of Parliament
- In office 12 June 1996 – 15 July 2001
- Preceded by: Wadud Bhuiyan
- Succeeded by: Wadud Bhuiyan
- Constituency: Khagrachari
- In office 27 February 1991 – 15 February 1996
- Preceded by: A. K. M. Alim Ullah
- Succeeded by: Wadud Bhuiyan
- Constituency: Khagrachari

Personal details
- Born: 13 January 1922 Taraboniya, Khagrachhari District, Chittagong Hill Tracts
- Died: 25 July 2018 (aged 96) Dhaka, Bangladesh
- Party: Bangladesh Awami League

Kalparanjan Chakma (13 January 1922 – 25 July 2018) was a Bangladeshi Awami League politician and a Minister of Chittagong Hill Tracts Affairs. He helped negotiate the release of two Danes and a Briton kidnapped by Shanti Bahini members in Chittagong Hill Tracts.

A tribal leader and a former M.P. from Khagrachari, he died on 25 July 2018 in Dhaka.
