= Jamchhari Union =

Union of Bandarban District, Chittagong, Bangladesh

Jamchhari জামছড়ি
- Union
- Interactive map of Jamchhari
- Country: Bangladesh
- Division: Chittagong Division
- District: Bandarban District
- Upazila: Bandarban Sadar Upazila

Population (2022)
  - Total: 6,702
- Time zone: UTC+6 (BST)
- Postal code: 4600
- Website: jamchariup.bandarban.gov.bd

Jamchhari Union is a union of Bandarban Sadar Upazila under Bandarban District.

== Demography ==
According to 2022 census, total population of the Union are 6,702. Among them, 414 are Muslim, 6,021 are Buddhist, 223 are Hindu and 44 are Christian.

Religion-2022
1. Buddhism (89.8%)
2. Islam (6.18%)
3. Hinduism (3.33%)
4. Christianity (0.65%)
5. Others (0.07%)

== Ethnicity ==
This Union is home to a variety of different ethnic groups. Among them, 1,224 are Bengali, 4,493 are Marma and 985 are of others ethnic groups.

Ethnicity-2022
1. Marma (67.0%)
2. Bengali (18.3%)
3. Others (14.7%)
