= Kamalchhari Union =

Union of Khagrachhari District, Chittagong, Bangladesh

Kamalchhari কমলছড়ি
- Union
- Interactive map of Kamalchhari
- Country: Bangladesh
- Division: Chittagong Division
- District: Khagrachhari District
- Upazila: Khagrachhari Sadar Upazila

Area
  - Total: 56.74 km^{2} (21.91 sq mi)

Population (2022)
  - Total: 15,977
  - Density: 281.6/km^{2} (729.3/sq mi)
- Time zone: UTC+6 (BST)
- Postal code: 4400
- Website: kamalchariup.khagrachhari.gov.bd

Kamalchhari Union is a union of Khagrachhari Sadar Upazila under Khagrachhari District.

== Demography ==
According to 2022 census, total population of the Union are 15,977. Among them, 4,202 are Muslim, 10,020 are Buddhist, 1,158 are Hindu and 597 are Christian.

Religion-2022
1. Buddhism (62.7%)
2. Islam (26.3%)
3. Hinduism (7.25%)
4. Christianity (3.74%)
5. Others (0.00%)

== Ethnicity ==
This Union is home to a variety of different ethnic groups. Among them, 4,283 are Bengali, 7,603 are Chakma, 2,887 are Marma, 1,184 are Tripura and 20 are of others ethnic groups.

Ethnicity-2022
1. Chakma (47.6%)
2. Bengali (26.8%)
3. Marma (18.1%)
4. Tripura (7.41%)
5. Others (0.12%)
