= Sualak Union =

Union of Bandarban District, Chittagong, Bangladesh

Sualak সুয়ালক
- Union
- Interactive map of Sualak
- Country: Bangladesh
- Division: Chittagong Division
- District: Bandarban District
- Upazila: Bandarban Sadar Upazila

Area
  - Total: 73.99 km^{2} (28.57 sq mi)

Population (2022)
  - Total: 13,367
  - Density: 180.7/km^{2} (467.9/sq mi)
- Time zone: UTC+6 (BST)
- Postal code: 4600
- Website: suwalokup.bandarban.gov.bd

Sualak/Suwalok Union is a union of Bandarban Sadar Upazila under Bandarban District.

== Demography ==
According to 2022 census, total population of the Union are 13,367. Among them, 7,268 are Muslim, 2,976 are Buddhist, 1,390 are Christian, 294 are Hindu and 1,439 are others.

Religion-2022
1. Islam (54.4%)
2. Buddhism (22.3%)
3. Christianity (10.4%)
4. Hinduism (2.20%)
5. Others (10.8%)

== Ethnicity ==
This Union is home to a variety of different ethnic groups. Among them, 7,590 are Bengali, 1,931 are Mru, 1,828 are Marma, 31 are Tripura and 1,987 are of others ethnic groups.

Ethnicity-2022
1. Bengali (56.8%)
2. Mru (14.4%)
3. Marma (13.7%)
4. Tripura (0.23%)
5. Others (14.9%)
