= Kuhalong Union =

Union of Bandarban District, Chittagong, Bangladesh

Kuhalong কুহালং
- Union
- Interactive map of Kuhalong
- Country: Bangladesh
- Division: Chittagong Division
- District: Bandarban District
- Upazila: Bandarban Sadar Upazila

Area
  - Total: 83.95 km^{2} (32.41 sq mi)

Population (2022)
  - Total: 13,273
  - Density: 158.1/km^{2} (409.5/sq mi)
- Time zone: UTC+6 (BST)
- Postal code: 4600
- Website: kuhalongup.bandarban.gov.bd

Kuhalong Union is a union of Bandarban Sadar Upazila under Bandarban District.

== Demography ==
According to 2022 census, total population of the Union are 13,273. Among them, 3,650 are Muslim, 9,116 are Buddhist, 302 are Christian, 196 are Hindu and 9 are others.

Religion-2022
1. Buddhism (68.7%)
2. Islam (27.5%)
3. Christianity (2.27%)
4. Hinduism (1.48%)
5. Others (0.07%)

== Ethnicity ==
This Union is home to a variety of different ethnic groups. Among them, 4,055 are Bengali, 6,567 are Marma, 211 are Tripura, 102 are Mru and 787 are of others ethnic groups.

Ethnicity-2022
1. Marma (49.5%)
2. Bengali (30.6%)
3. Tripura (1.59%)
4. Mru (0.77%)
5. Bom, Tanchangya and Others (17.6%)
