= Khagrachhari (Jatiya Sangsad constituency) =

Constituency of Bangladesh's Jatiya Sangsad

Coordinates: 23.11°N 91.99°E

- Constituency for the Jatiya Sangsad
- District: Khagrachhari District
- Division: Chittagong Division
- Electorate: 515,419 (2024)

Current constituency
- Created: 1984
- Party: Bangladesh Nationalist Party
- Member: Wadud Bhuiyan
- ← 297 Cox's Bazar-4 299 Rangamati →

Khagrachhari is a constituency represented in the Jatiya Sangsad (National Parliament) of Bangladesh since 2026 by Wadud Bhuiyan of the Bangladesh Nationalist Party.

== Boundaries ==
The constituency encompasses the Khagrachhari Hill District.

== Members of Parliament ==
Election	Member	Party
1986	AKM Alim Ullah	Jatiya Party (Ershad)
1991	Kalparanjan Chakma	Awami League
Feb 1996	Wadud Bhuiyan	Bangladesh Nationalist Party
Jun 1996	Kalparanjan Chakma	Awami League
2001	Wadud Bhuiyan	Bangladesh Nationalist Party
2008	Jotindra Lal Tripura	Awami League
2014	Kujendra Lal Tripura	Awami League
2018	Kujendra Lal Tripura	Awami League
2024	Kujendra Lal Tripura	Awami League
2026	Wadud Bhuiyan	Bangladesh Nationalist Party

== Elections ==
=== Elections in the 2010s ===
General Election 2018: Khagrachhari
Party	Candidate	Votes	%	±%
AL	Kujendra Lal Tripura	236,156	67.66	N/A
Independent	Nutan Kumar Chakma	59,257	16.98	N/A
BNP	Shahidul Islam Bhuiyan	51,266	14.69	N/A
JP(E)	Solaiman Alam Seth	2,340	0.67	N/A
Majority		176,899	50.68	
Turnout		349,019	79.01	
Registered electors		441,843		
AL hold				
