= Khagrachhari Hill District Council =

Administrative unit in Bangladesh

Khagrachari Hill District Council
- খাগড়াছড়ি পার্বত্য জেলা পরিষদ
- Formation: 6 March 1989; 37 years ago
- Headquarters: KHDC Building, Khagrachhari Sadar, Bangladesh
- Region served: Khagrachhari District
- Chairman: Mongsueprou Chowdhury
- Chief Executive Officer: Suman Chowdhury
- Main organ: Government of Bangladesh
- Parent organization: Ministry of Chittagong Hill Tracts Affairs
- Budget: Allocated by Government
- Website: khdc.gov.bd

Khagrachhari Hill District Council (Bengali: খাগড়াছড়ি পার্বত্য জেলা পরিষদ) is the local government council responsible for the administration of Khagrachhari, Bangladesh. The chairman of the council is Kongjari Chowdhury.

== History ==
On 6 March 1989, the Khagrachhari Local Government council was established to look after the welfare of the tribal and ethnic minorities in the District. In the Chittagong Hill Tracts (Rangamati District, Bandarban District, Khagrachhari District), there were tensions between the government of Bangladesh and Parbattya Chattagram Jana Sanghati Samiti, which represented tribal communities. On 2 December 1997, the government of Bangladesh and the Parbattya Chattagram Jana Sanghati Samiti signed a peace treaty ending the conflict. After the treaty was signed, steps were taken by the government to strengthen the council as required by the treaty. The council was renamed to Khagrachhari Hill District Council. Since the peace treaty was signed, the council built 40 schools and renovated 100 schools.
