= Jotindra Lal Tripura =

Bangladeshi politician

Member of the Bangladesh Parliament for Khagrachari
- In office 2008–2012
- Preceded by: Wadud Bhuiyan
- Succeeded by: Kujendra Lal Tripura

Personal details
- Born: 28 July 1947 (age 78) Khagrachari Bangladesh
- Party: Awami League

Jotindra Lal Tripura (Bengali: যতীন্দ্র লাল ত্রিপুরা; born 28 July 1947) is a Bangladeshi politician, belonging to the Awami League. Tripura is the Khagrachhari District president of the Awami League. In the December 2008 election Tripura was elected as a Member of Parliament from the Parbattya Khagrachhari constituency, with 122,750 votes (43.9%). He did not stand again in the 2014 elections.
