= Bandarban Sadar Union =

Union of Bandarban District, Chittagong, Bangladesh

Bandarban Sadar বান্দরবান সদর
- Union
- Interactive map of Bandarban Sadar
- Country: Bangladesh
- Division: Chittagong Division
- District: Bandarban District
- Upazila: Bandarban Sadar Upazila

Area
  - Total: 57.01 km^{2} (22.01 sq mi)

Population (2022)
  - Total: 10,172
  - Density: 178.4/km^{2} (462.1/sq mi)
- Time zone: UTC+6 (BST)
- Postal code: 4600
- Website: bandarbansadarup.bandarban.gov.bd

Bandarban Sadar Union is a union of Bandarban Sadar Upazila under Bandarban District.

== Demography ==
According to 2022 census, total population of the Union are 10,172. Among them, 4,099 are Muslim, 4,743 are Buddhist, 1,067 are Christian, 249 are Hindu and 14 are others.

Religion-2022
1. Buddhism (46.6%)
2. Islam (40.3%)
3. Christianity (10.5%)
4. Hinduism (2.45%)
5. Others (0.14%)

== Ethnicity ==
This Union is home to a variety of different ethnic groups. Among them, 4,465 are Bengali, 2,803 are Marma and 2,904 are of others ethnic groups.

Ethnicity-2022
1. Bengali (43.9%)
2. Marma (27.6%)
3. Bom, Tripura, Tanchangya and Others (28.5%)
