= Bandarban Sadar Upazila =

Bandarban Sadar বান্দরবান সদর উপজেলা
- Upazila
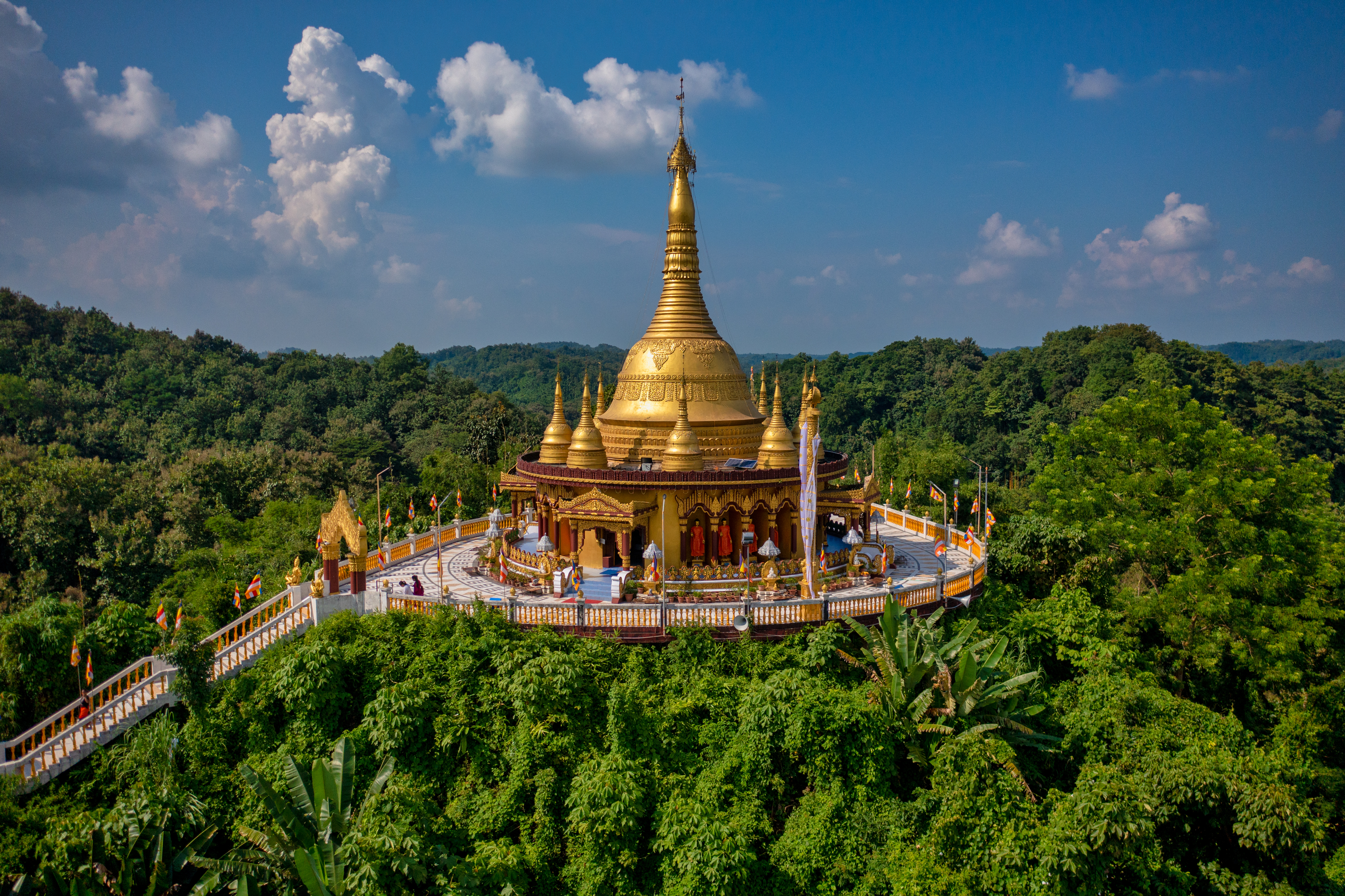
- Buddha Dhatu Jadi

- Coordinates: 22°14′N 92°11.5′E
- Country: Bangladesh
- Division: Chittagong
- District: Bandarban
- Jatiya Sangsad constituency: Bandarban
- Headquarters: Bandarban Sadar Upazila Complex

Government
  - Body: Upazila Council
  - MP: Sa Ching Prue Jerry
  - Chairman: .
  - Executive officer: Umm Habiba Meera

Area
  - Total: 501.98 km^{2} (193.82 sq mi)

Population (2022)
  - Total: 111,096
  - Density: 221.32/km^{2} (573.20/sq mi)
- Time zone: UTC+6 (BST)
- Postal code: 4600
- Area code: 0361
- Website: sadar.bandarban.gov.bd

Bandarban Sadar Upazila mauza geocode map

Bandarban Sadar (Bengali: বান্দরবান সদর) is an upazila of Bandarban District in the Division of Chittagong, Bangladesh.

== Geography ==
Bandarban Sadar is located at 22.2333°N 92.1917°E. It has a total area of 501.98 km^{2}.

== Demographics ==
According to the 2022 Bangladeshi census, Bandarban Sadar Upazila had 25,844 households and a population of 111,096. 9.02% of the population were under 5 years of age. Bandarban Sadar had a literacy rate (age 7 and over) of 73.86%: 78.62% for males and 68.59% for females, and a sex ratio of 109.99 males for every 100 females. 76,046 (68.45%) lived in urban areas.

=== Religion ===
Religions in Bandarban Sadar Upazila (2022)
Religion	Percent
Islam	45.38%
Buddhism	36.88%
Hinduism	7.85%
Christianity	5.83%
Other or not stated	4.07%

Islam the largest religion in Bandarban Upazila. Islam is being followed by about 46% of the population. Buddhists form the second-largest religious minority. According to the 2022 census Buddhists form 36% of the total population.

Population by religion in Union/Paurashava
Union/Paurashava	Muslim	Buddhist	Christian	Hindu	Tribal Religion
Bandarban Paurashava	32,449	12,315	1,879	7,673	134
Sadar	4,099	4,743	1,067	249	14
Jamchhari	414	6,021	44	223	0
Kuhalong	3,650	9,116	302	196	9
Rajbila	1,825	4,481	117	37	0
Sualak	7,268	2,976	1,390	2,94	1439
Tankabati	1,142	884	1,674	49	2,923

🟩 Muslim majority 🟨 Buddhist majority 🟥Tribal Religion Majority

=== Ethnicity ===
The ethnic population was 47,804 (43.03%), of which Marma were 26,628, Mru 7,280, Tanchangya 5,605, Bom 2,748, Tripura 1,771, Chakma 1,664 and Khiang 1,310.

Ethnicity in Bandarban Upazila (2022)
1. Bengali (57.0%)
2. Marma (24.0%)
3. Mro (6.55%)
4. Tanchangya (5.05%)
5. Bom (2.47%)
6. Tripura (1.59%)
7. Chakma (1.50%)
8. Khyang (1.18%)
9. Others (0.72%)

Population by ethnicity in Union/Paurashava
Union/Paurashava	Bengali	Marma	Mro	Tripura	Others
Bandarban Paurashava	42,453	7,272	400	981	3,344
Bandarban	4,465	2,803	35	276	2,593
Jamchhari	1,224	4,493	50	2	933
Kuhalong	4,055	6,567	102	211	2,338
Rajbila	1,890	3,655	18	110	787
Sualak	7,590	1,828	1,931	31	1,987
Tankabati	1,615	10	4,744	160	143

🟩 Bengali majority 🟦 Marma majority 🟫 Mro Majority

== Administration ==
Bandarban Sadar Upazila is divided into Bandarban Municipality and five union parishads: Bandarban Sadar, Kuhalong, Rajbila, Sualak, Jamchhari and Tankabati. The union parishads are subdivided into 16 mauzas and 225 villages.

Bandarban Municipality is subdivided into 9 wards and 69 mahallas.

== See also ==
- Upazilas of Bangladesh
- Districts of Bangladesh
- Divisions of Bangladesh
