= Buddha Dhatu Jadi =

Buddhist Pagoda in Bangladesh

Buddha Dhatu Jadi Bandarban Golden Temple
- বুদ্ধ ধাতু জাদি
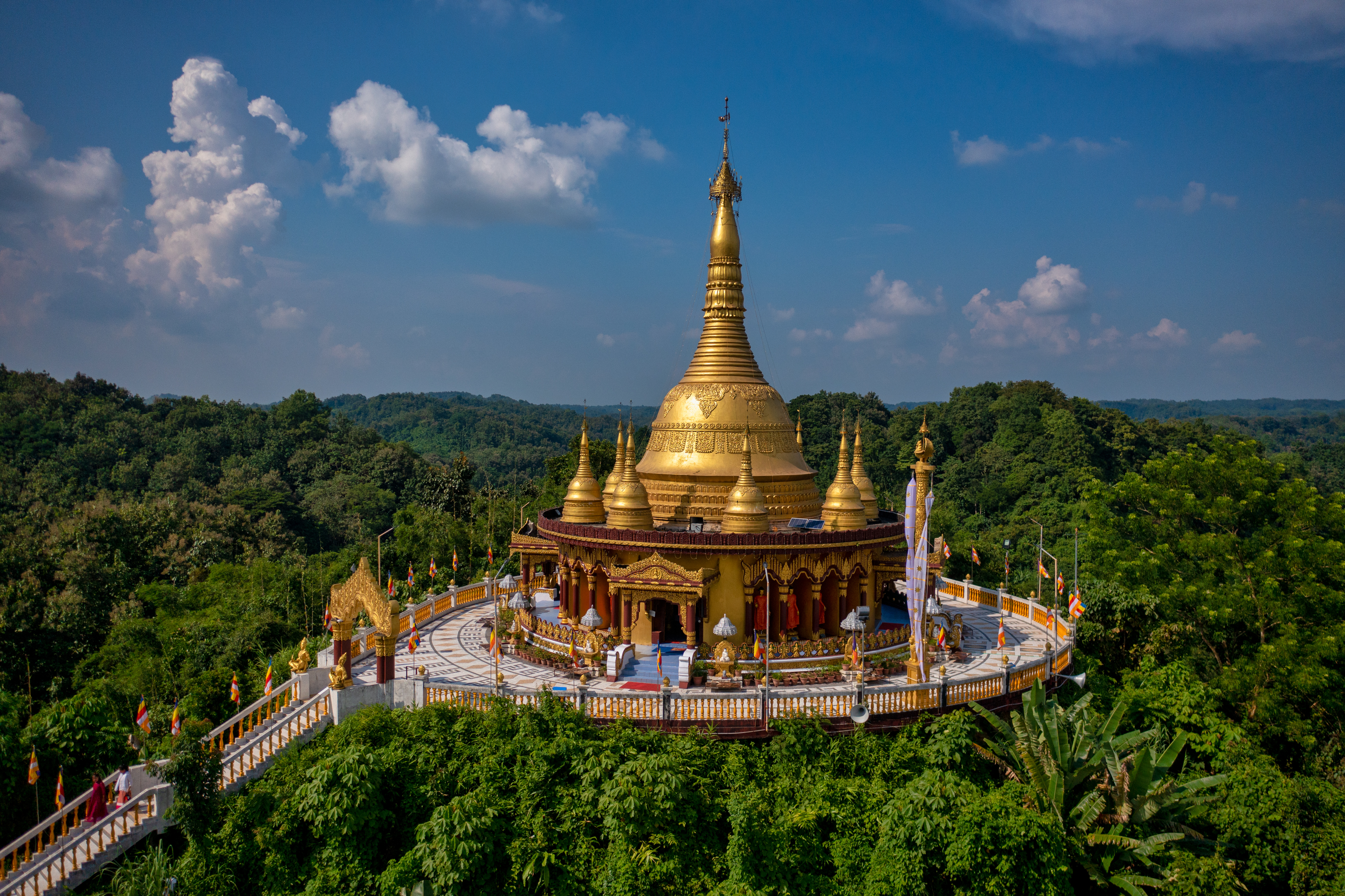

- Location within Bangladesh

Religion
- Affiliation: Buddhism; Buddhist Temple
- Sect: Theravada Buddhism
- District: Bandarban
- Region: Chittagong
- Deity: Buddha
- Festival: Maha Pravrijya
- Status: Active

Location
- Location: Bandarban, Chittagong, Bangladesh
- Country: Bangladesh
- Coordinates: 22.2231095°N 92.1977168°E

Architecture
- Founder: U Pannya Jota Mahathera
- Established: December 25, 1995; 30 years ago
- Completed: February 5, 2000; 26 years ago
- Height (max): 60 ft (18 m)

The Buddha Dhatu Jadi (Bengali: বুদ্ধ ধাতু জাদি; Burmese: ဗုဒ္ဓဓာတုစေတီ also known as the Bandarban Golden Temple) is located close to Balaghata town, in Bandarban City, in Bangladesh. Dhatu are the material remains of a holy person, and in this temple the relics belong to Buddha. It is the largest Theravada Buddhist temple in Bangladesh and has the second-largest Buddha statue in the country.

The Bandarban Golden Temple belongs to the Theravada Buddhism order, which is practiced by the Marma indigenous people, a dominant ethnic group of Bandarban. It was built in 2000 in Arakanese architecture, an adoption of the South East Asia style.

== Location ==
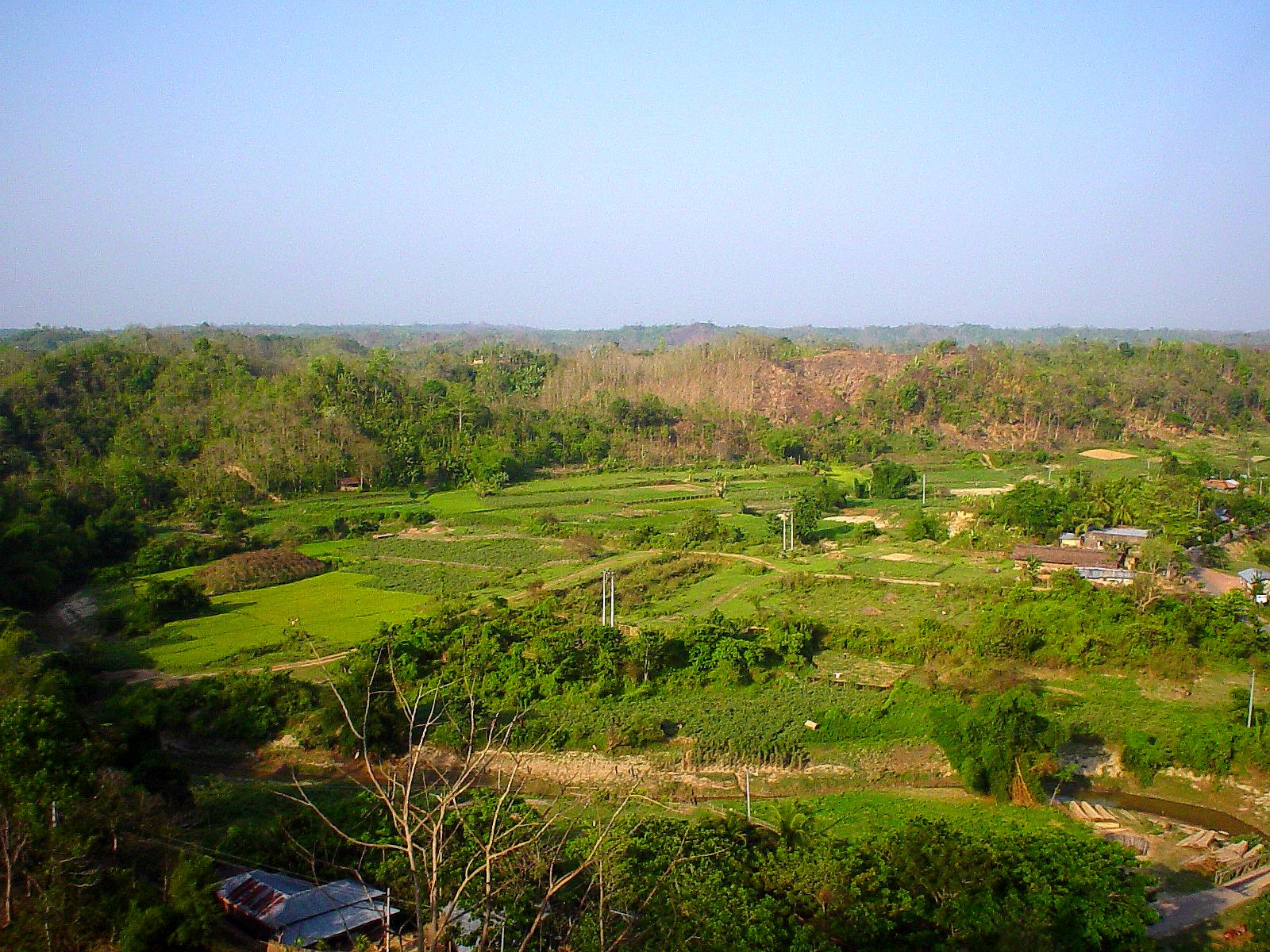
View of lush green Bandarban hills and valley

The Buddhist temple is known in the local language as Kyang. It is located in the remote Bandarban Hill District in south-eastern Bangladesh, which is part of the Chittagong Division of Chittagong Hill Tracts. The temple is ensconced in the hill town of Bandarban, which has two of the highest peaks with rolling hills, namely, the Tajingdong (4,000 feet (1,200 m)) and the Keokeradong (4,632 feet (1,412 m)), covered with dense forests with lush vegetation. Sangu river flows through the town. There is also a waterfall nearby. The temple is built on top of a 60 metres (200 ft) high hill, which is about 4 kilometres (2.5 mi) from the Balaghat town, and 10 kilometres (6.2 mi) from the Banderban city. Chittagong, known as a "picturesque part of Bangladesh that is referred to as the rooftop of the country", is about 92 kilometres (57 mi) away. Within the Bandarban town, the notable structures are the Ethnic Cultural Institute and a Museum. There is also a lake on the hill known as the Debota Pukur (meaning:"pond of the God").

== History ==
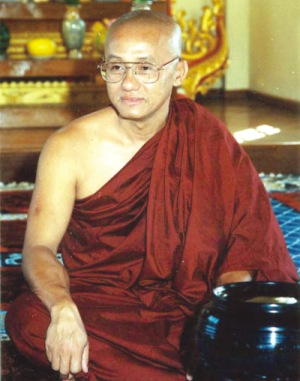
Ven. U Pannya Jota Mahathera founder and chief priest of the temple

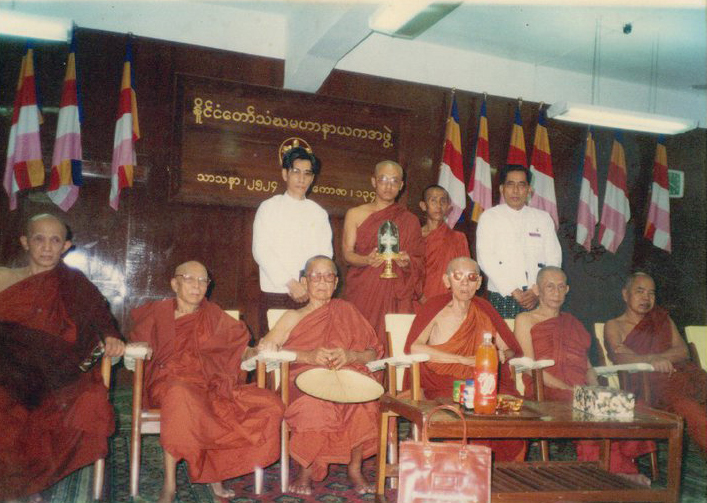
Buddha's Dhatu (Relic) donated by The State Sangha Mahanayaka Committee at Yangon, Myanmar on 1994

Bandarban has a large ethnic population of Buddhists. Buddhism is practiced by a small percentage of 0.7 in Bangladesh, predominantly a Muslim country. Buddhism is the third-largest religion in Bangladesh and the practice is of Theravada Buddhism; most Buddhists are from the south-eastern district of Chittagong and Chittagong Hill Tracts.

In Bangladesh, the Theravada Buddhism, now practiced as "Sangharaj Nikaya", was introduced in the late 19th century, replacing many of the old forms of Buddhism practiced till then. The credit for this is given to Ven. Saramedha, known popularly as "Sangharaj".

The ethnic population of the town belongs mostly to Marma, an indigenous group of the Chittagong hill region on the eastern end of the country. They are of Arakanese descent and Buddhists by religion, and are the second-largest indigenous group in the hill districts of Bangladesh.

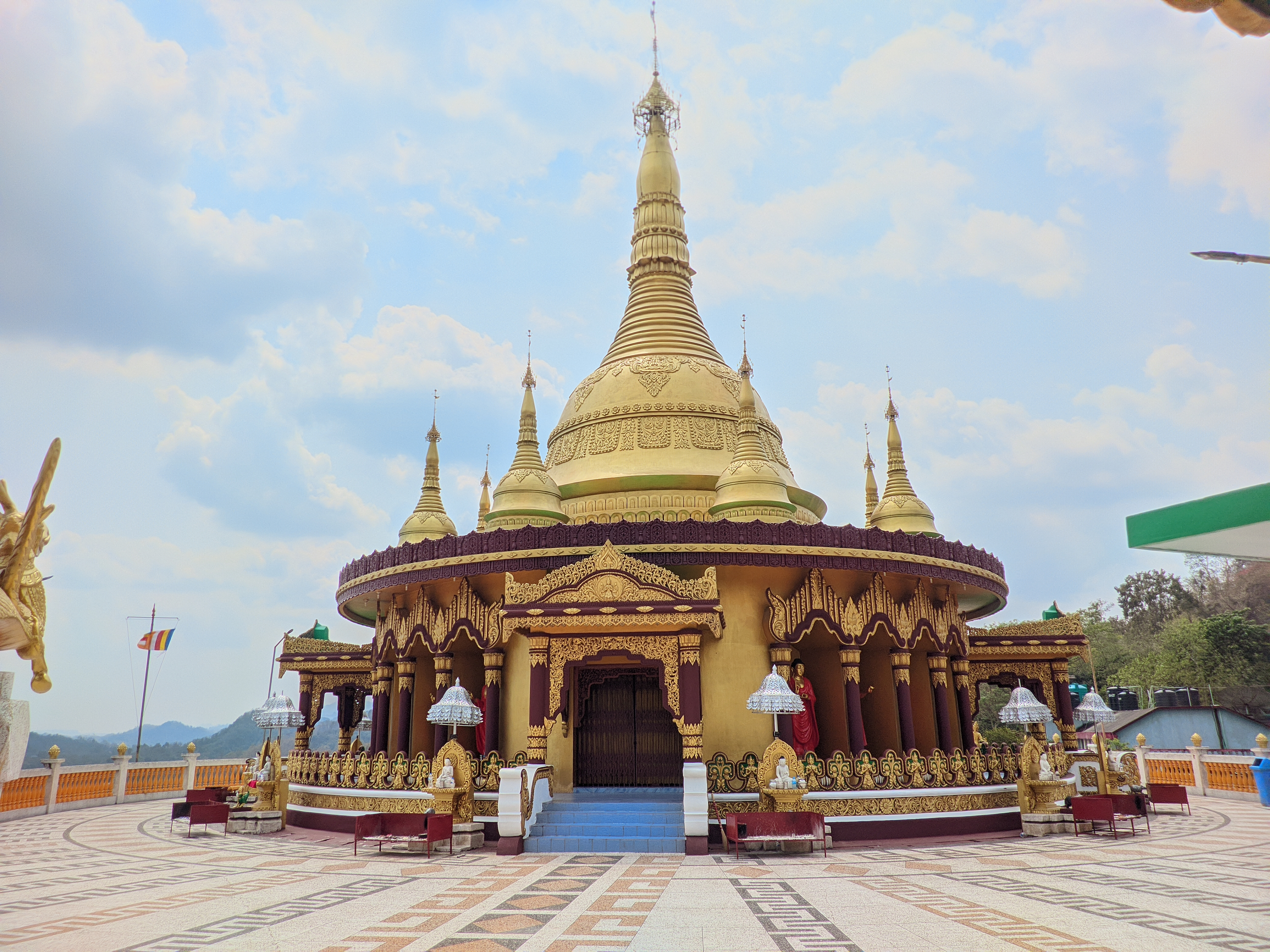
View of the temple in 2026

Ven. U Pannya Jota Mahathera is the founder and chief priest of the temple. He belongs to the royal Bohmong family of Bandarban. He is a Theravada monk since 1991. He had served the government of Bangladesh for 8 years as a senior assistant judge. The Buddha's dhatu (relic), which is enshrined in the temple, was a gift given to Ven. U Pannya Jota Mahathera in 1994 by the State Sangha Maha Nayaka Committee of Myanmar.

== Architecture ==
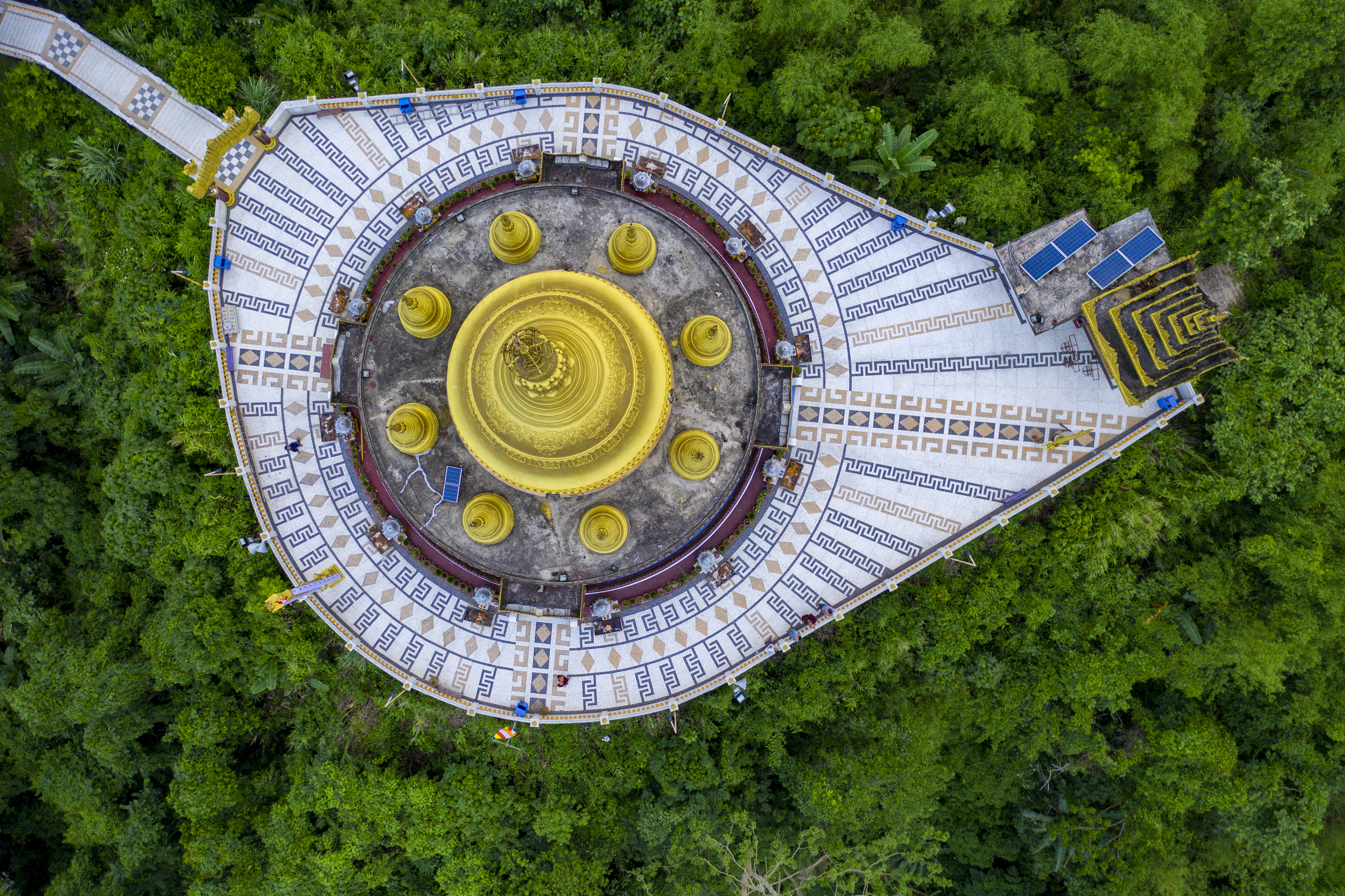
Aerial view of the temple

Approached by an elegant stairway, the impressive temple built on the hill top is decorated with exquisite sculptural images. Apart from the second-biggest statue of the Buddha that is enshrined in the sanctum, there are smaller statues and a golden bell set on a dragon within the temple precincts. Construction of the temple was started in 1995 and completed in 2000. The dhatu, the corporeal relics of Buddha, has been enshrined here below four statues of Buddha. Buddhists commonly believe that it provides for peace of mind and happiness. The temple now forms a part of the Tourism Development Project of the 'Buddhist Circuit Tour' that is sponsored by the South Asia Subregional Economic Cooperation.

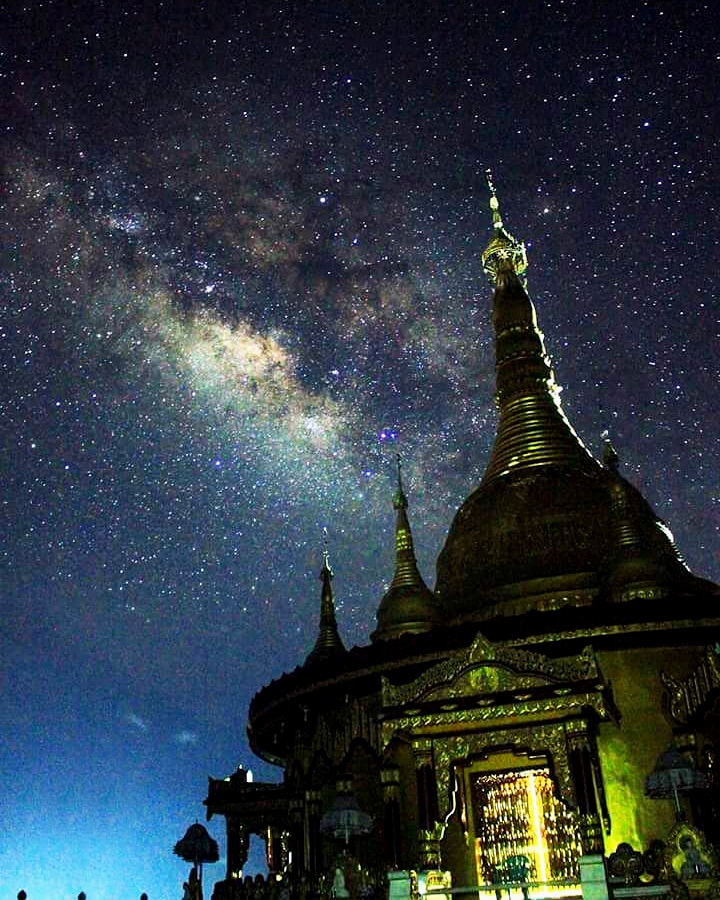
Night view of the temple

A strict dress code of 'no shorts and no shoes' in temple precincts is followed here.

== Gallery ==
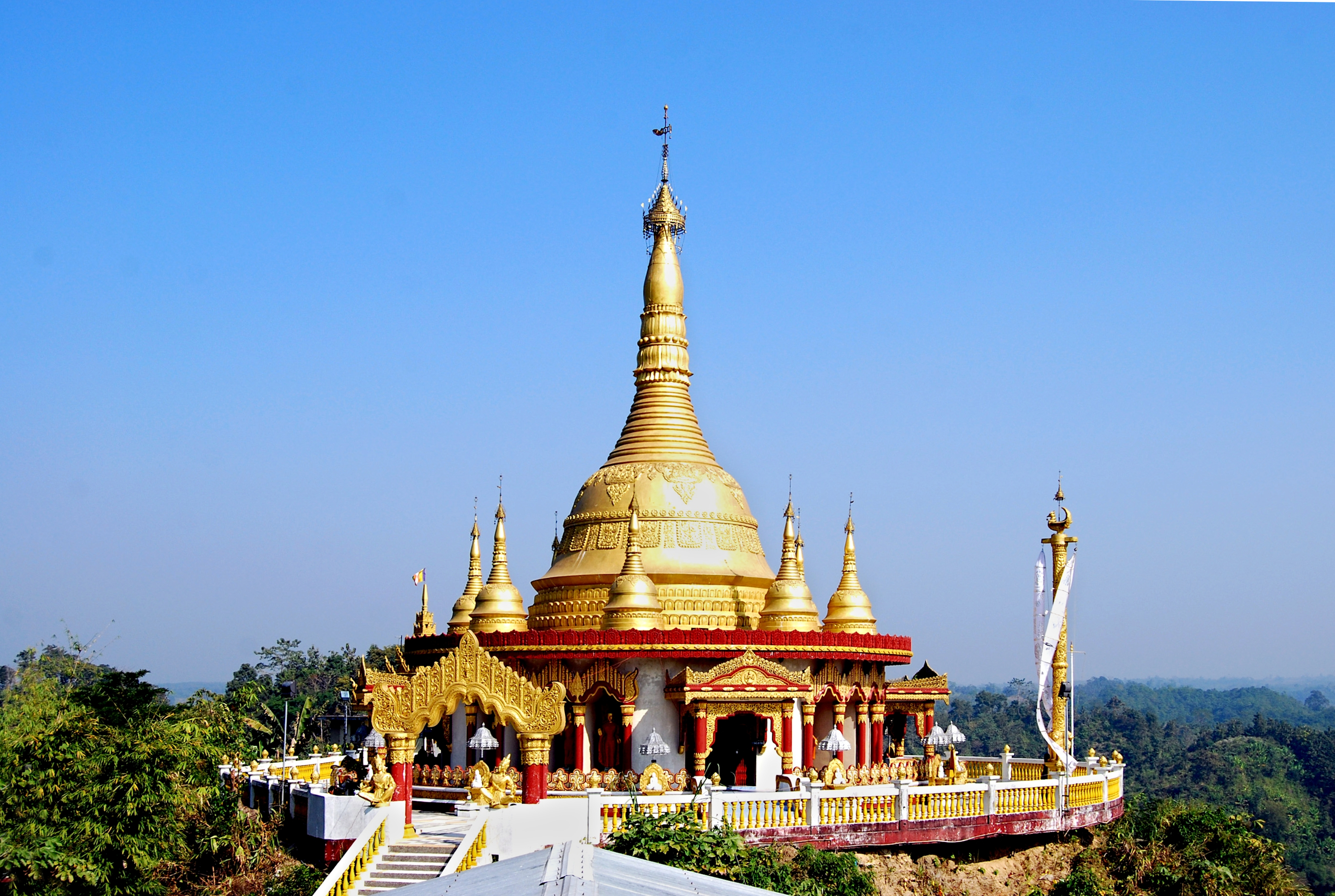
Upper view of Buddha Dhatu Jadi

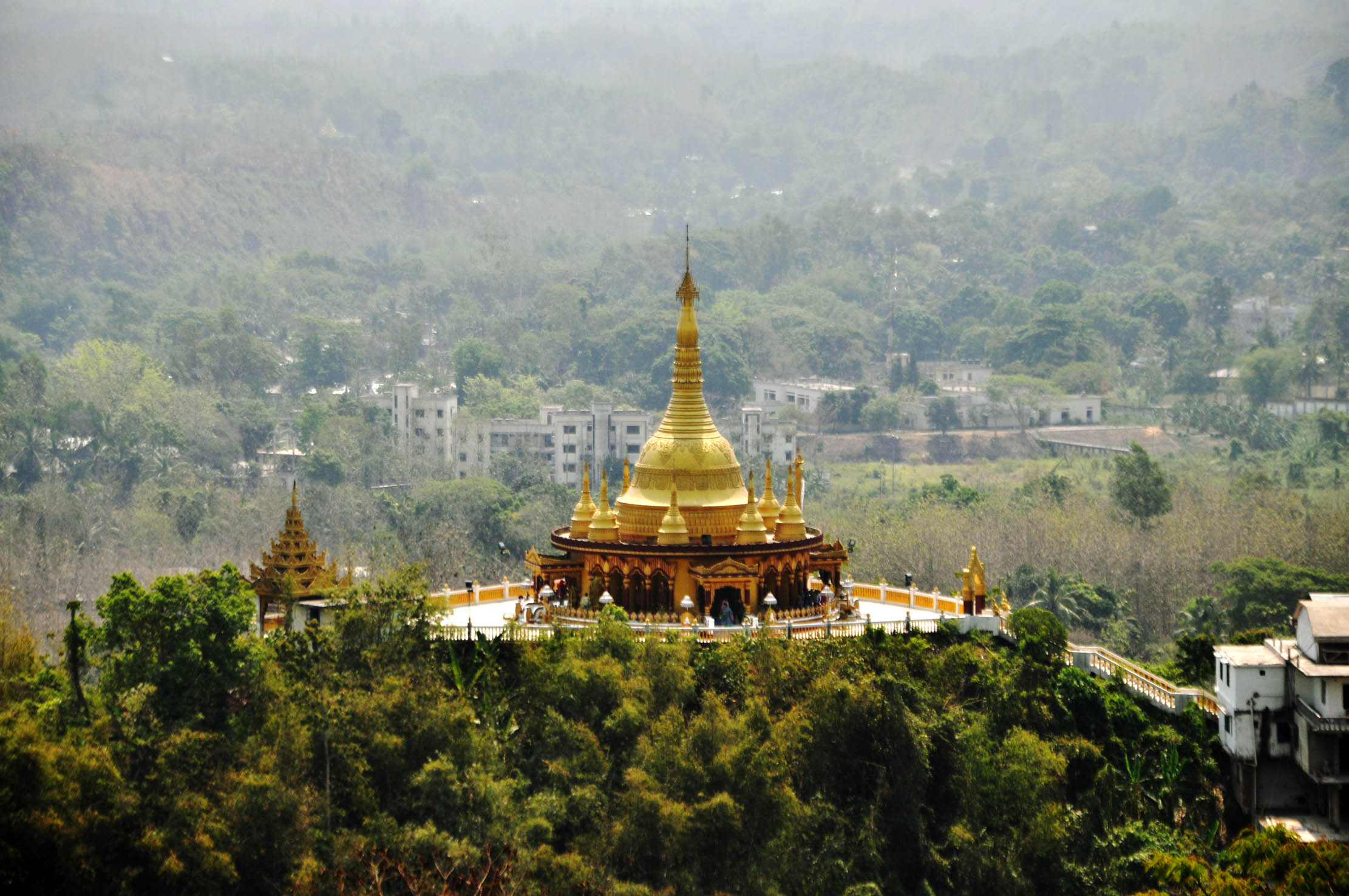
Long shot view of Buddha Dhatu Jadi

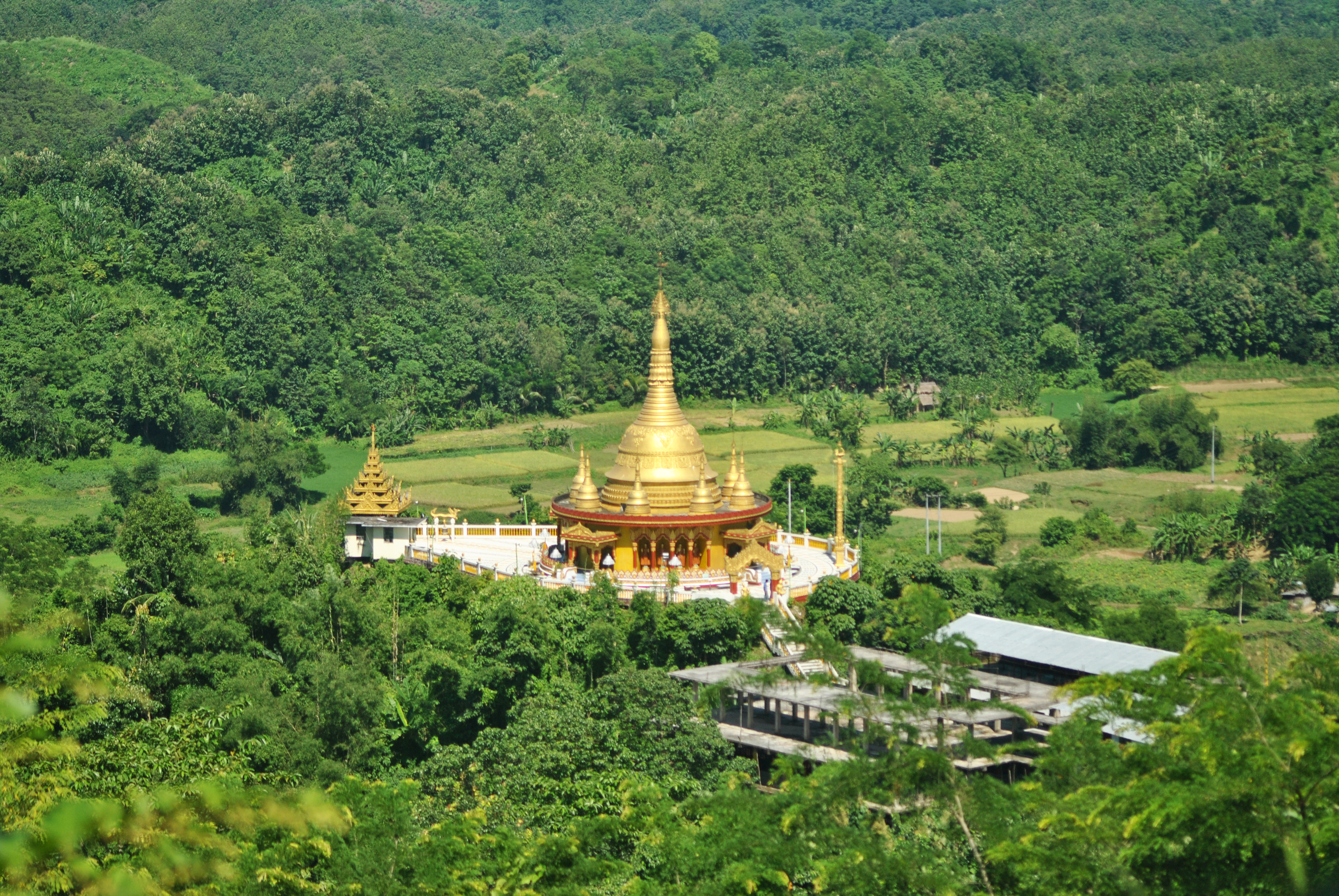
Surrounded by natural beauty

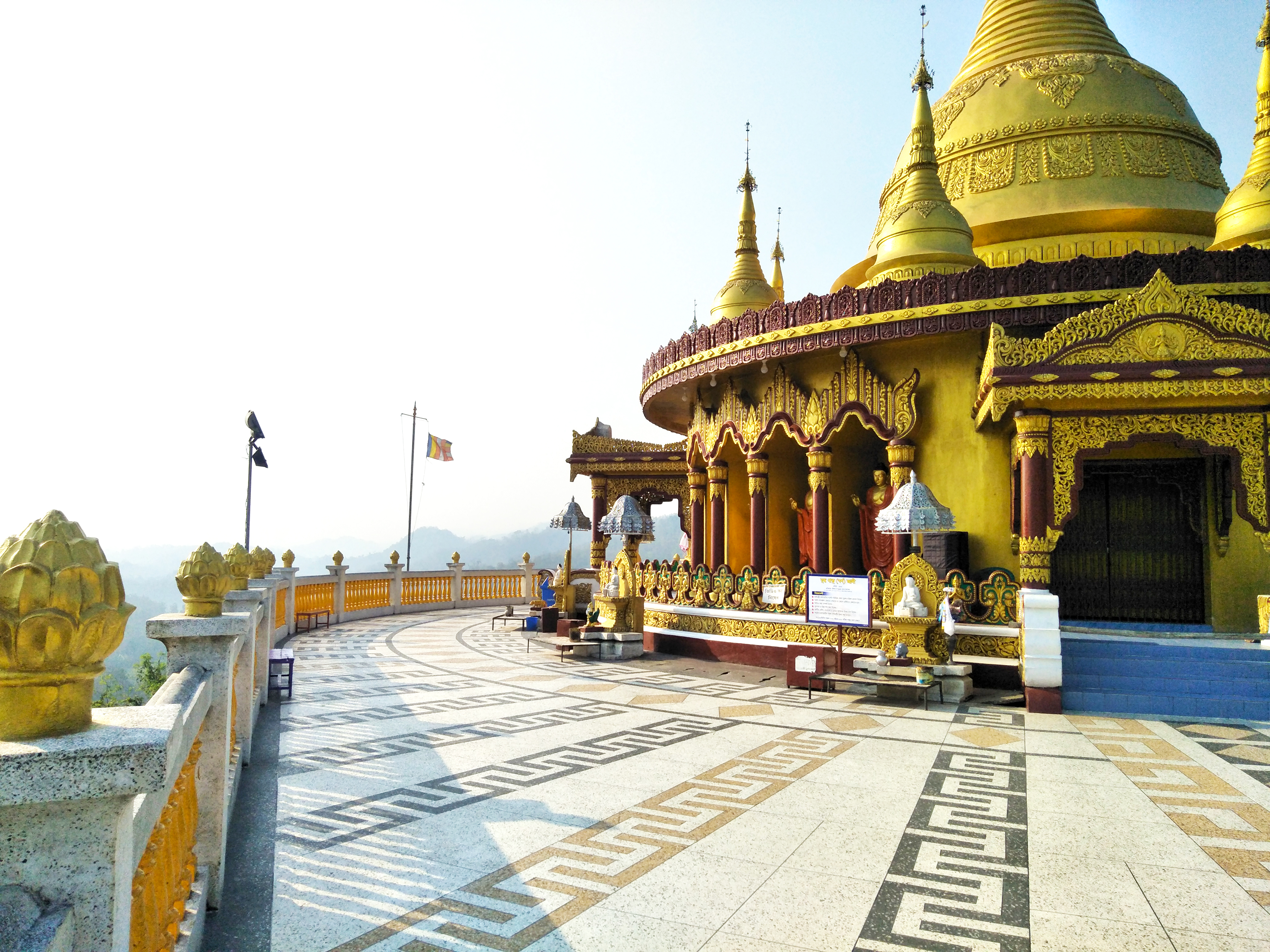
Side View of Buddha Dhatu Jadi

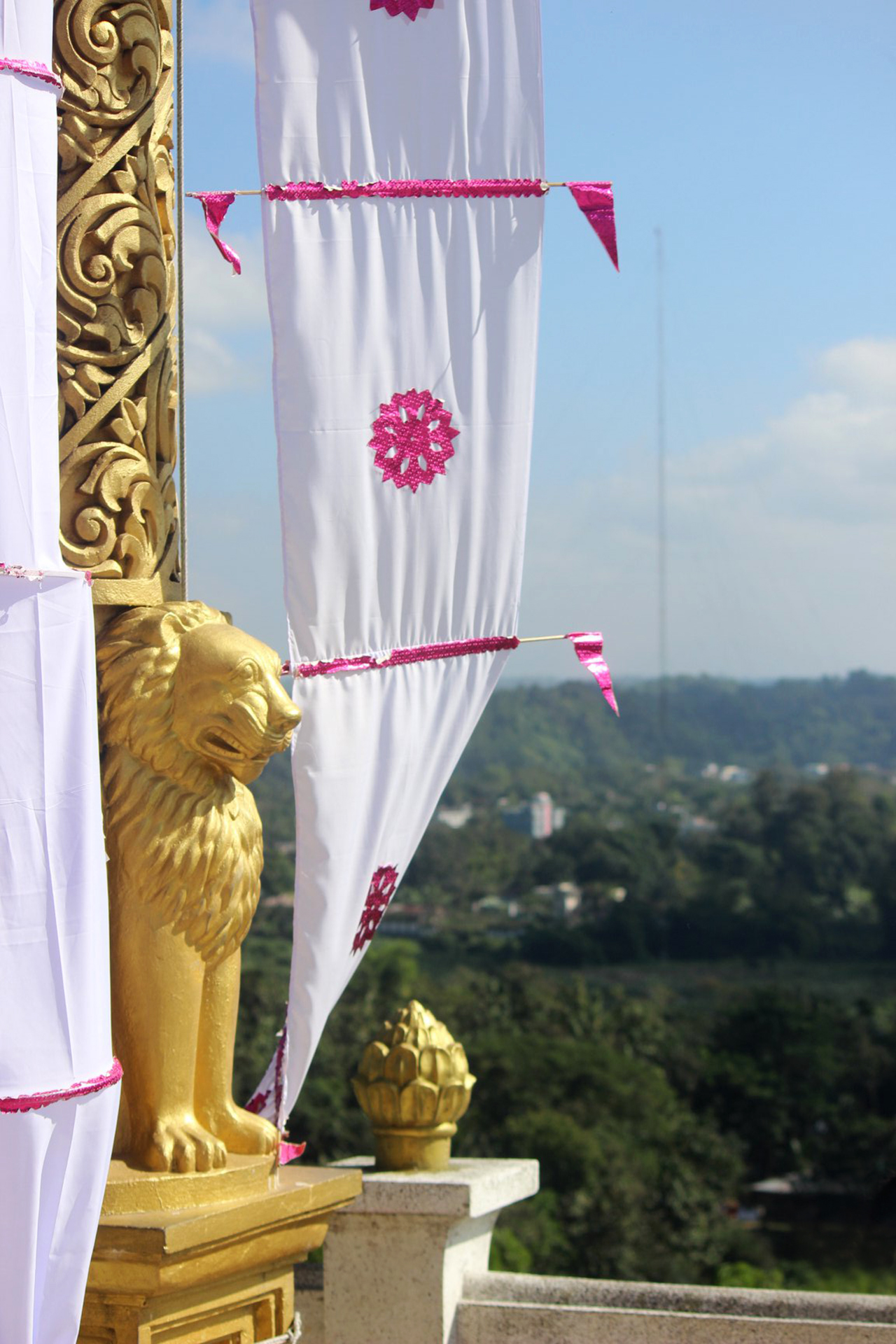
Pillars of Ashoka

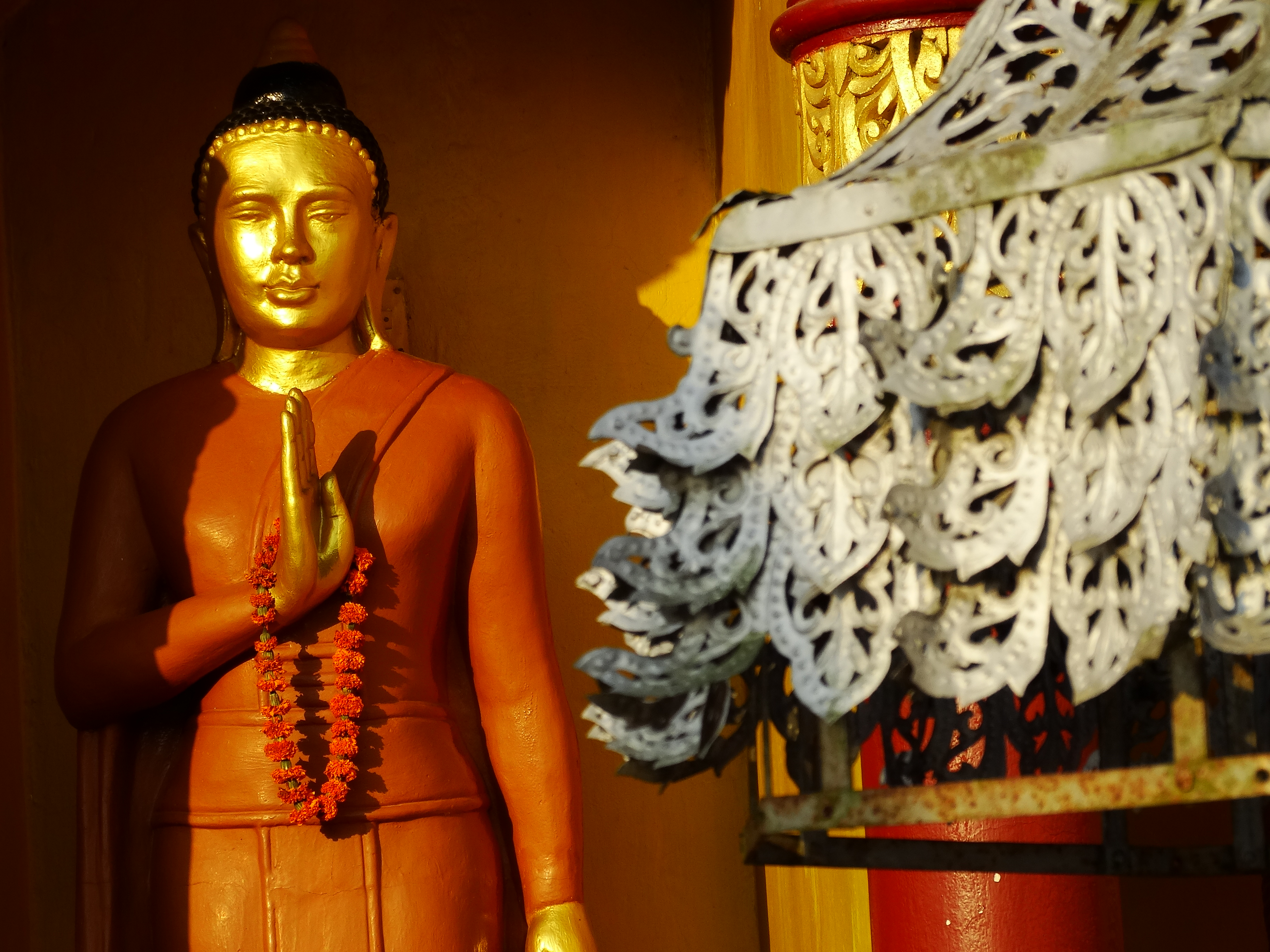
Buddha Statue

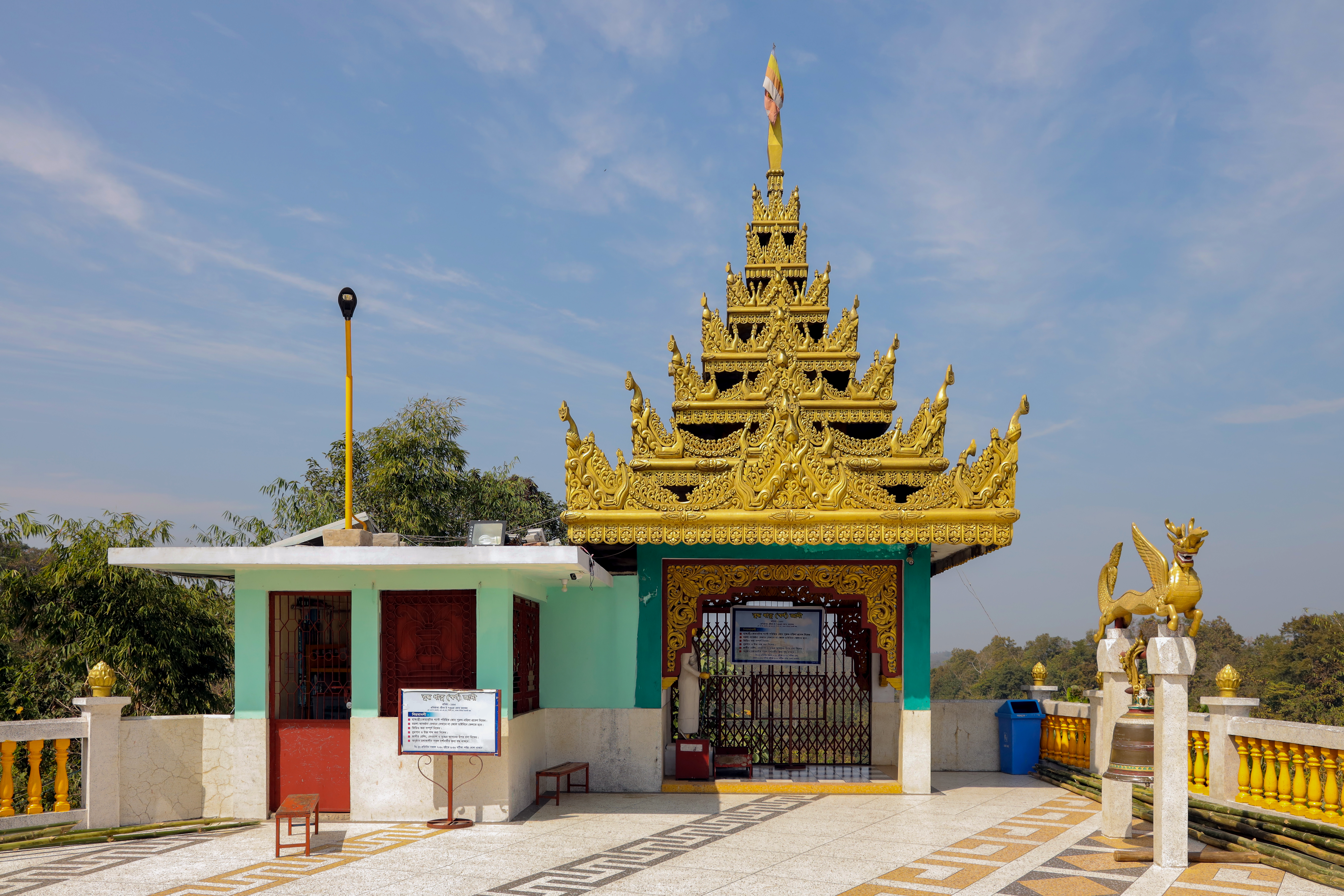

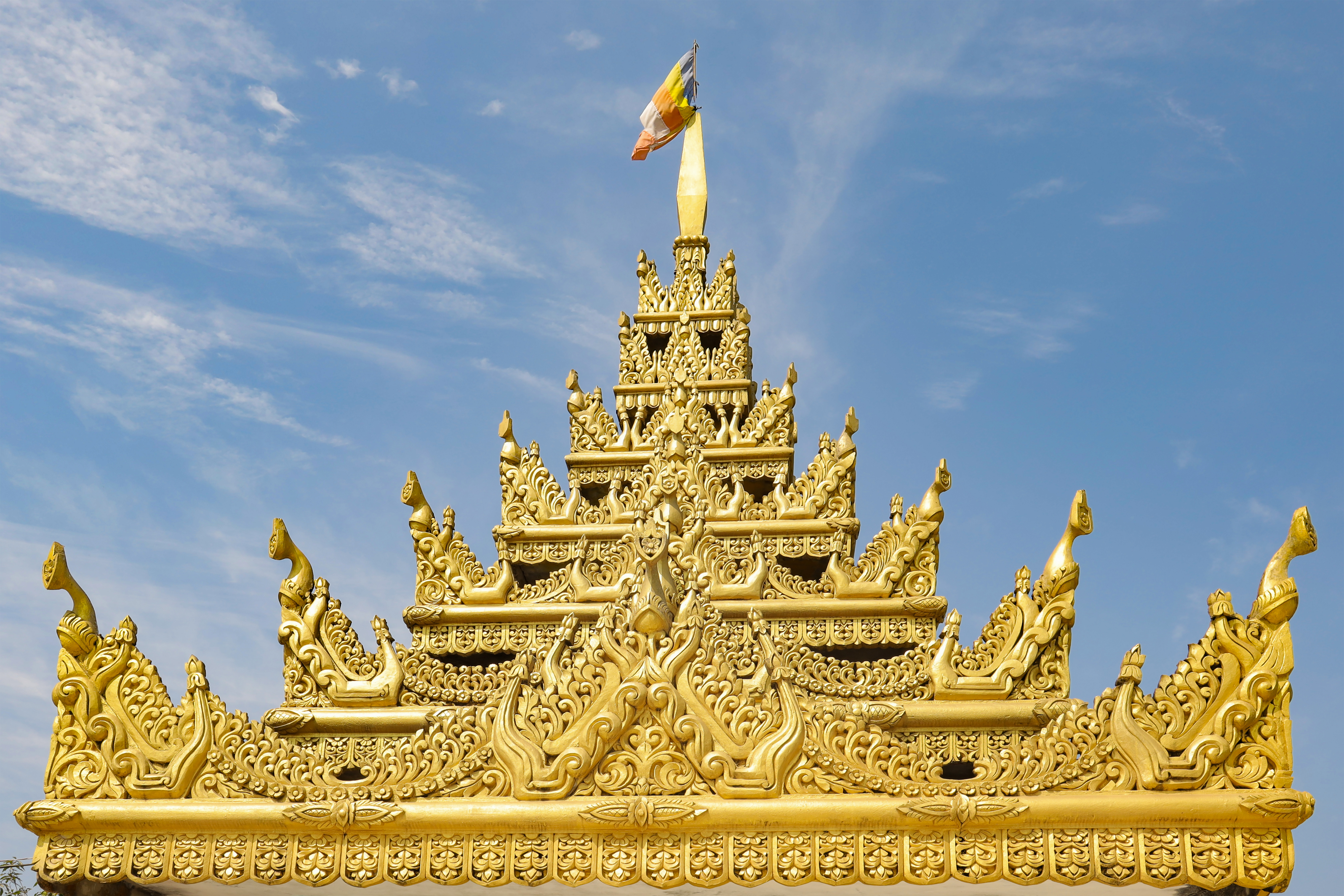

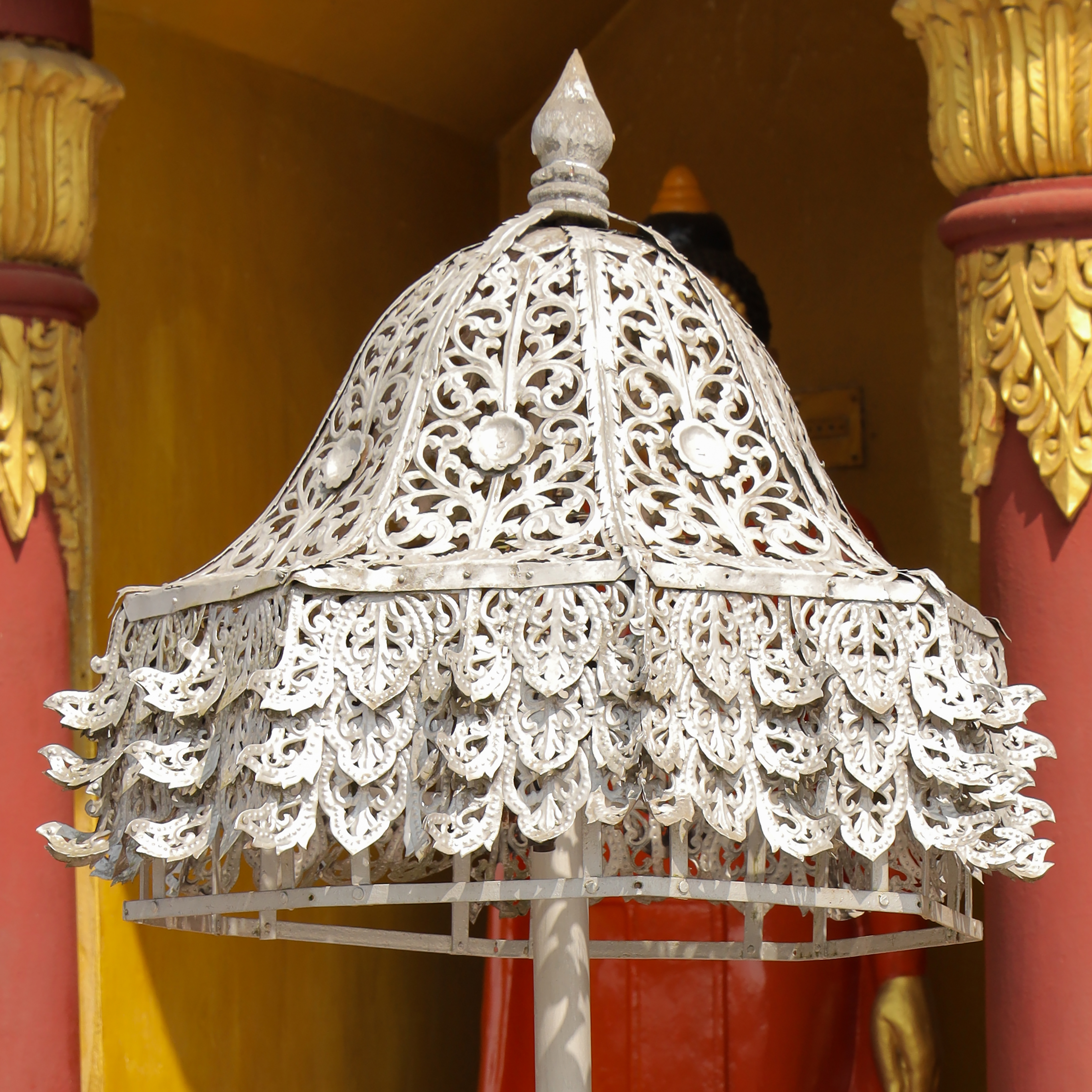

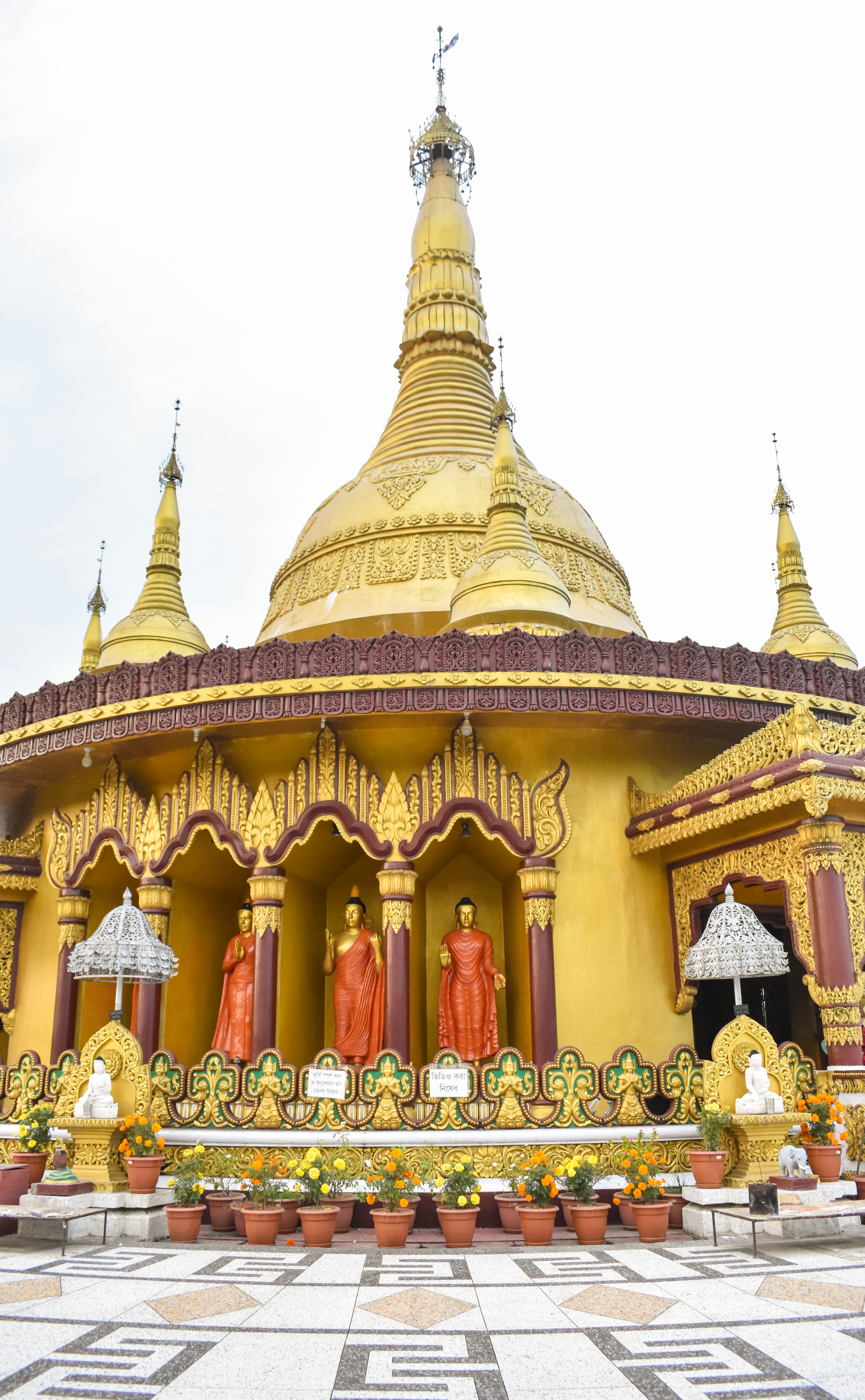
Buddha Dhatu Jadi, Bandarban

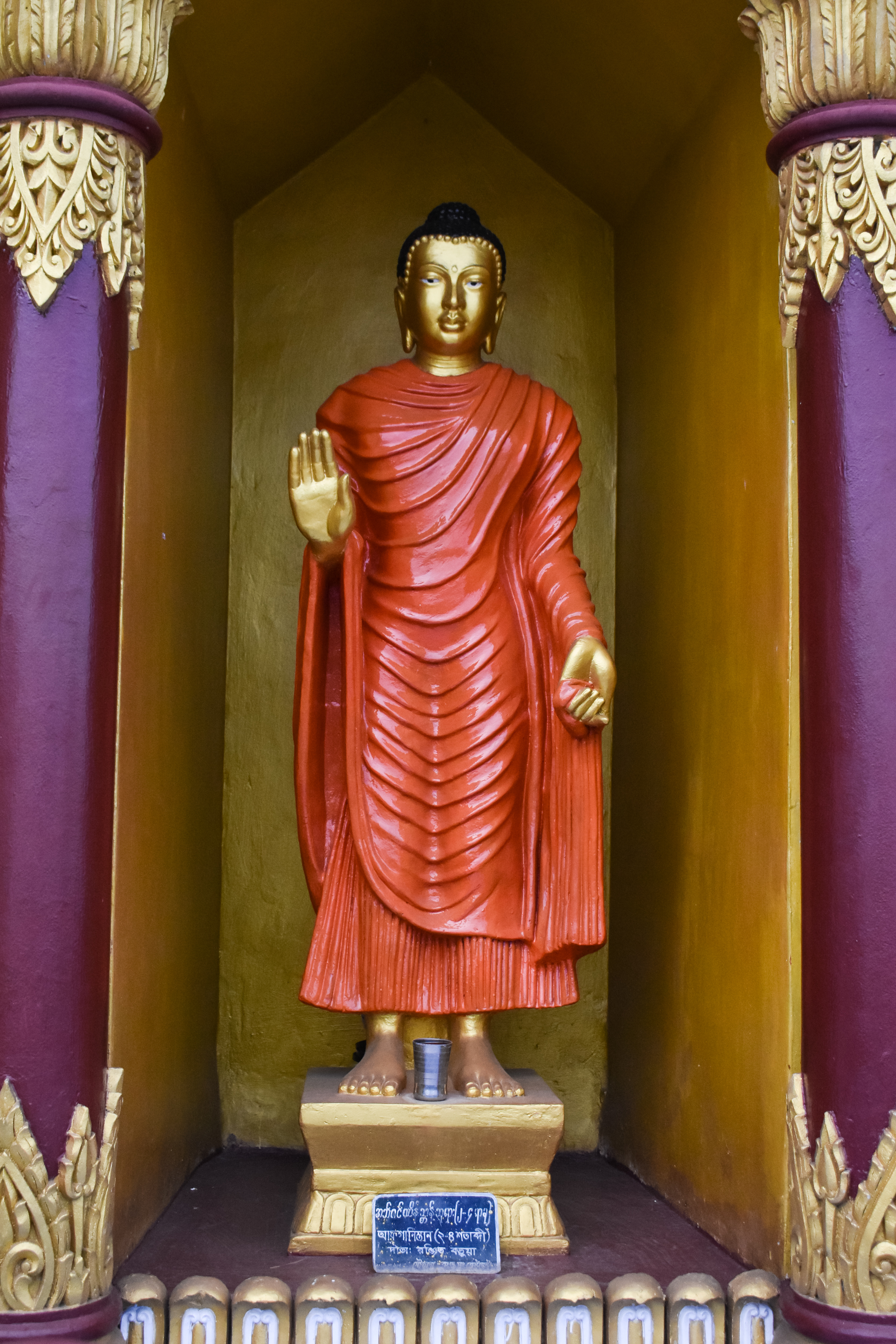
Statue of Buddha 1

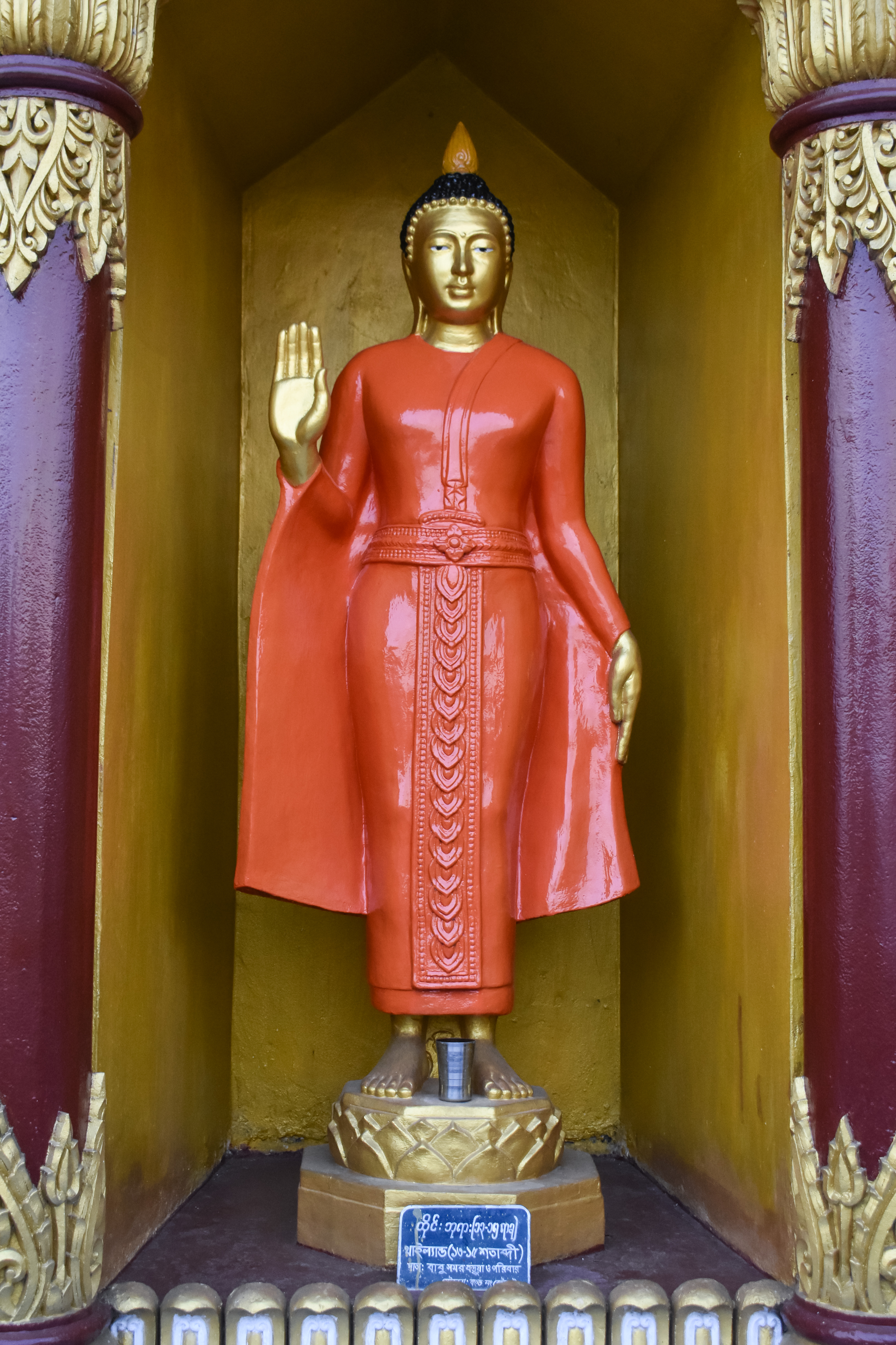
Statue of Buddha 2

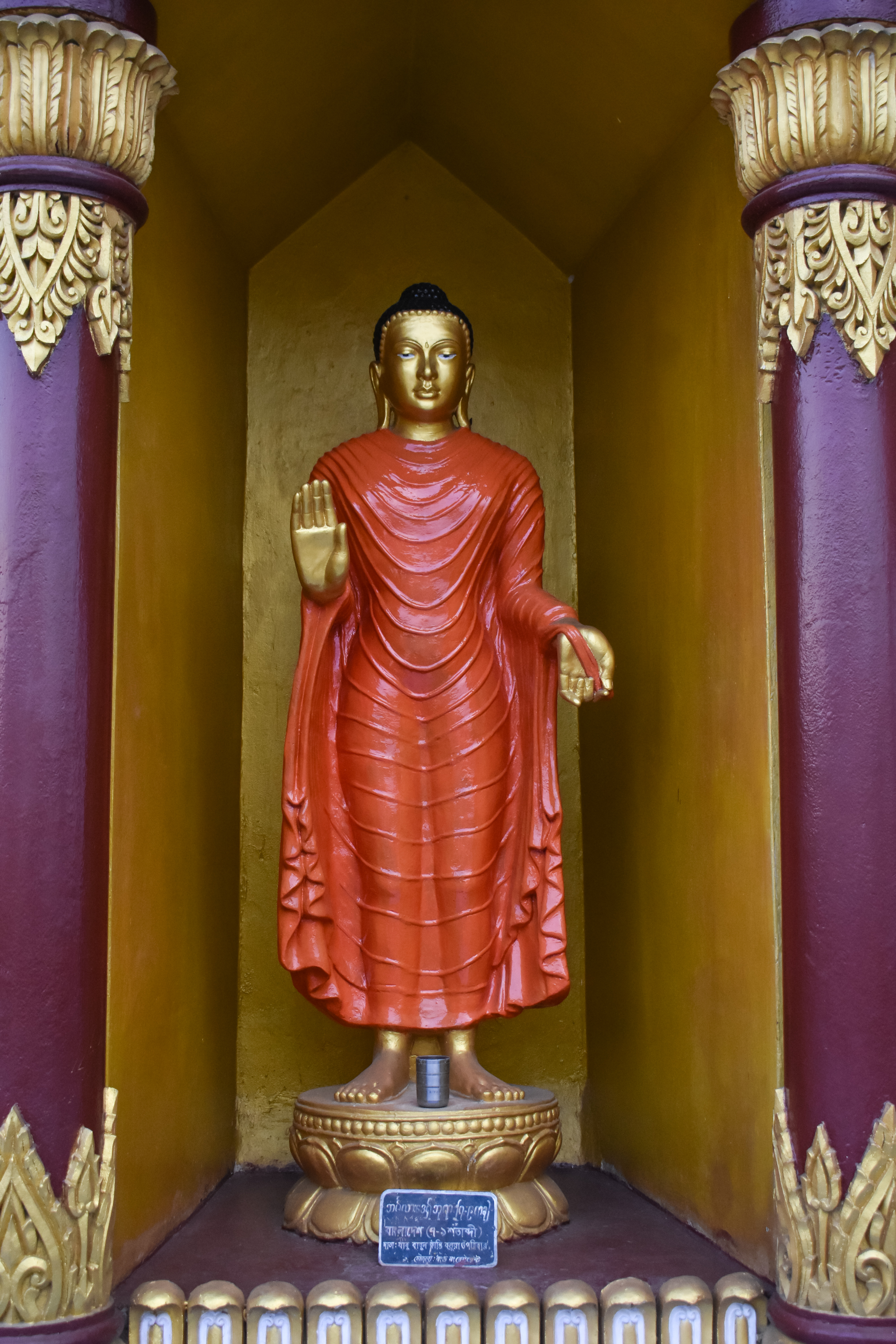
Statue of Buddha 3

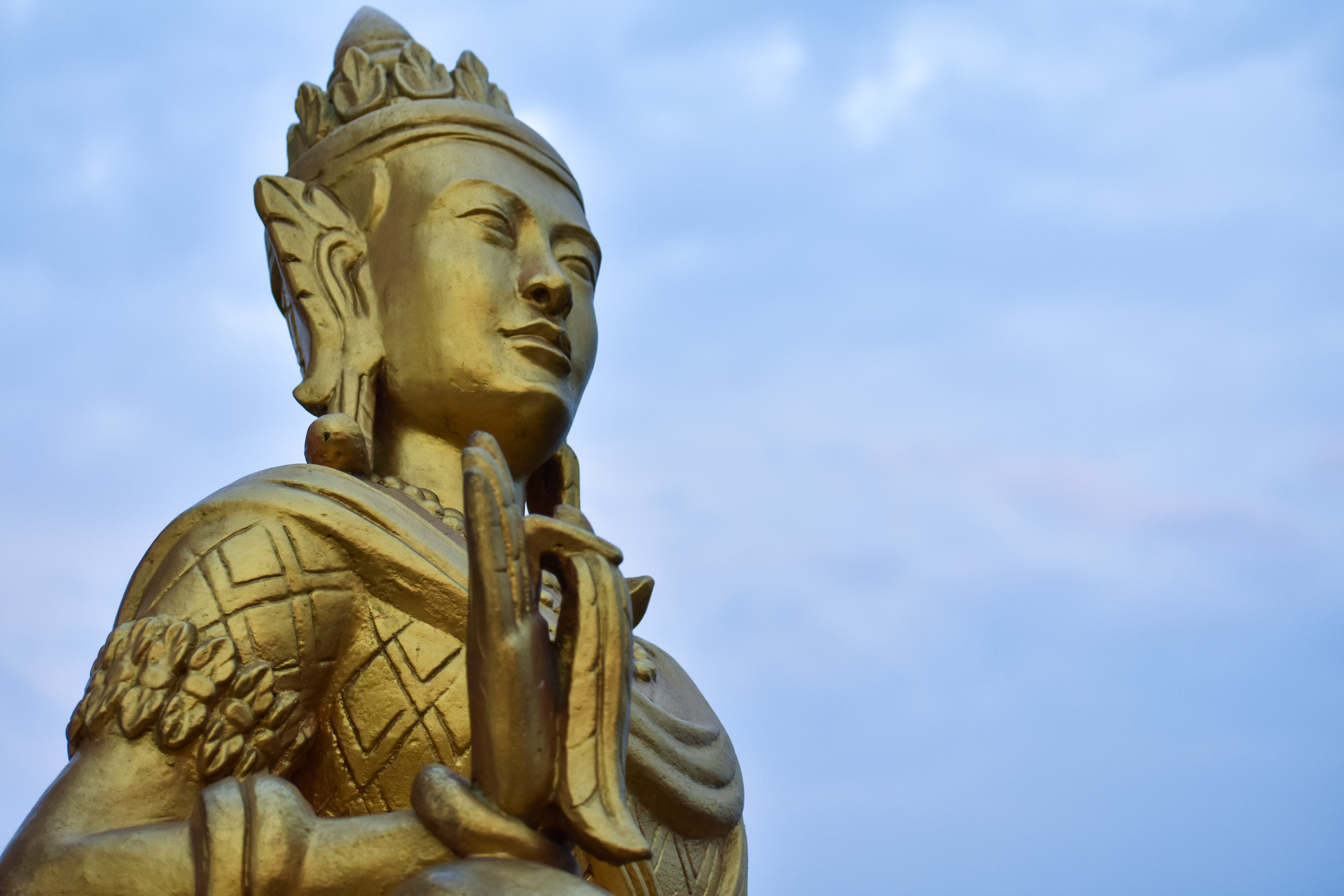
Statue of Shakyamuni

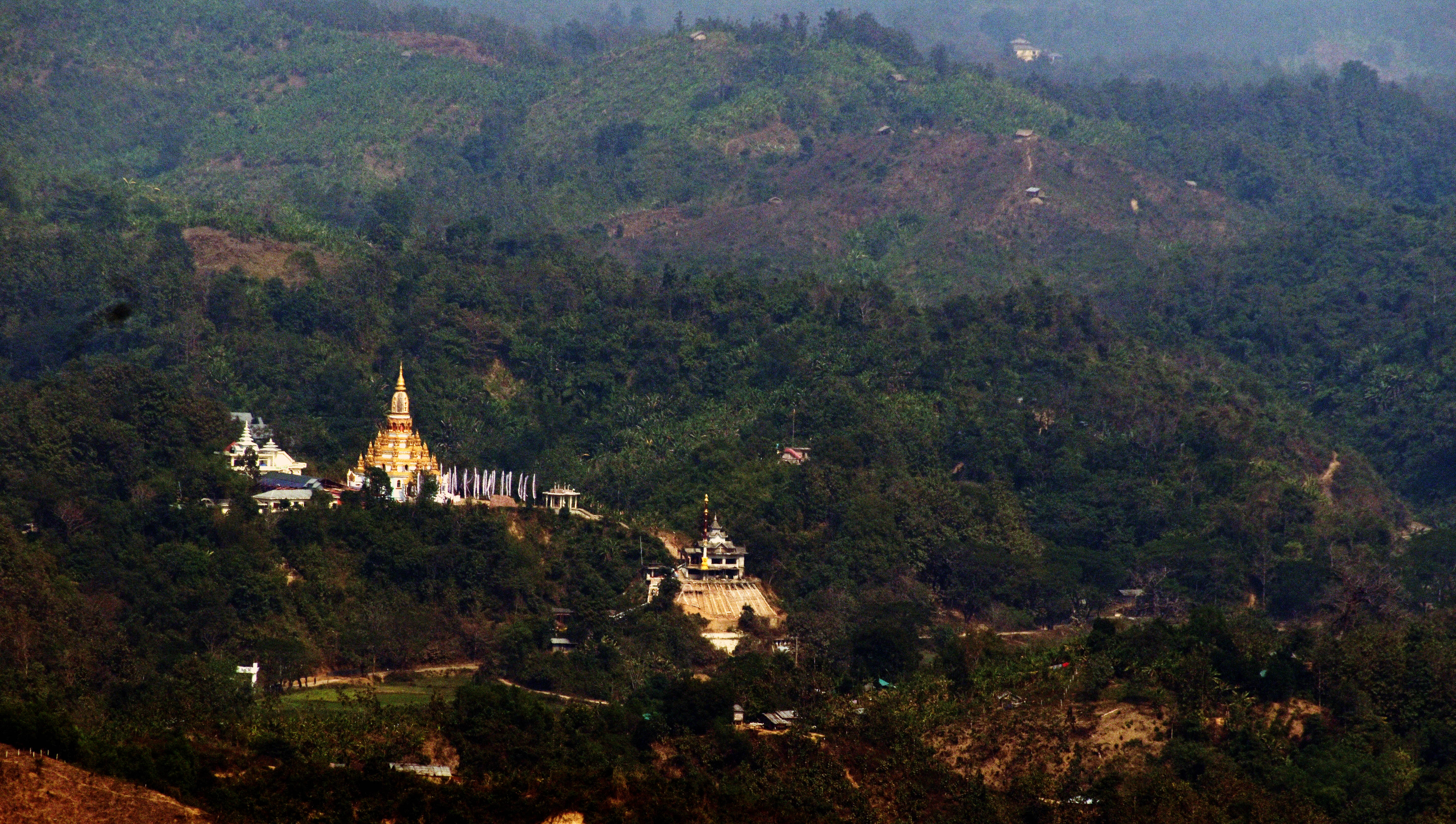
Buddha Dhatu Jadi (Golden Temple, Bandarban), seen from Nilachal, photo by Pratyay Hasan

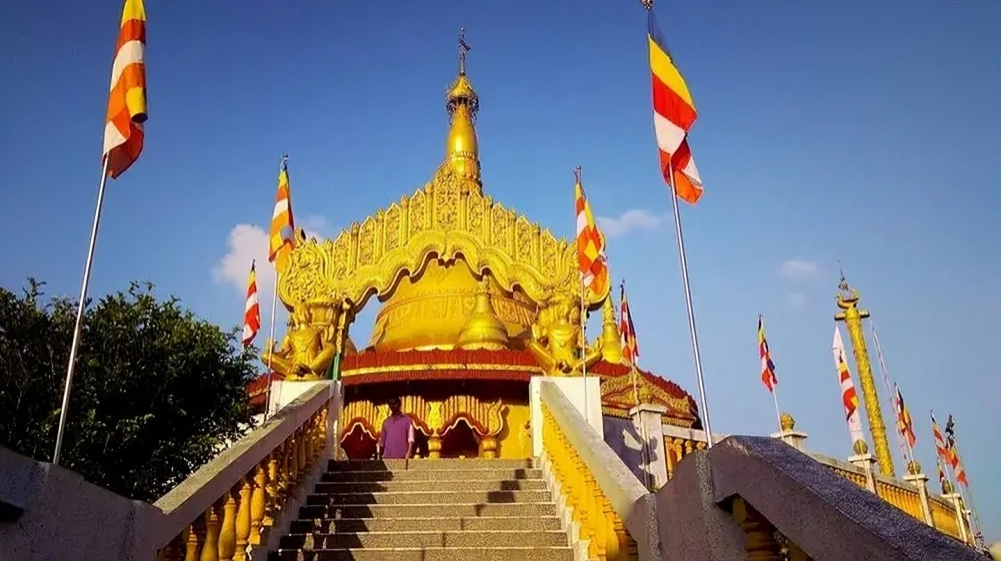
Entry view

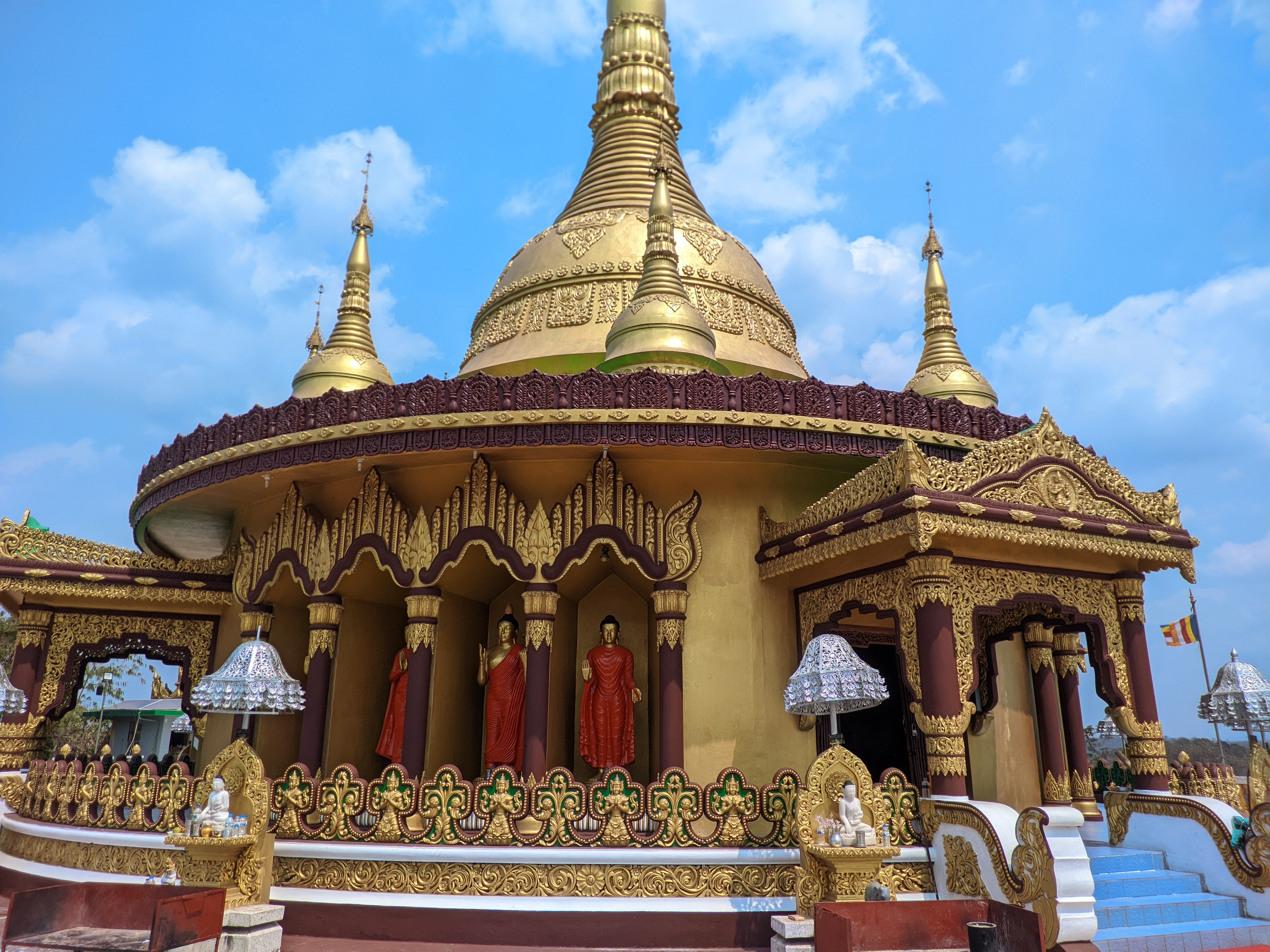
View of temple
