= Bandarban Hill District Council =

Council in Bandarban Hill, Bangladesh

- বান্দরবান পার্বত্য জেলা পরিষদ
- Logo of Bandarban Hill District Council
- Formation: 6 March 1989; 37 years ago
- Headquarters: BHDC Building, Bandarban Sadar, Bangladesh
- Region served: Bandarban District
- Chairman: Kyaw Shwe Hla
- Chief Executive Officer: Muhammad Masum Billah
- Main organ: Government of Bangladesh
- Parent organization: Ministry of Chittagong Hill Tracts Affairs
- Budget: Allocated by Government
- Website: bhdc.gov.bd

Bandarban Hill District Council is the regional government body responsible for the administration of Bandarban Hill District in Bangladesh. Prof. Thanzama Lushai is the chairman of the council.

== History ==
The Bandarban Local Government Council was established on 6 March 1989 to look after the welfare of the tribal minorities in the Bandarban Hill District. The Chittagong Hill Tracts conflict was a low intensity conflict in the Chittagong Hill Tracts (Rangamati District, Bandarban District, and Khagrachhari District) between the government of Bangladesh and the Parbattya Chattagram Jana Sanghati Samiti, which represented the tribal communities. On 2 December 1997, the government of Bangladesh and the Parbattya Chattagram Jana Sanghati Samiti signed a peace treaty ending the conflict. After the treaty was signed, steps were taken by the government to strengthen the council as required by the treaty. The council was renamed to Bandarban Hill District Council. The council announced plans to install small electric power plants in Bandarban District. The council built the Bangabandhu Memorial Library in Bandarban Sadar Upazila.
