= Dhurong Union =

Dhurong Union is a community in the Fatikchhari Upazila of Chittagong District, on the southeast coastal region of Bangladesh.

== Geography ==
Area: 1,972 acres (7.98 km^{2})

== Location ==
- North: Kanchan nagar Union
- East: Rangamatia Union
- South: Daulatpur Union
- West: Sundarpur Union

== Population ==
At the 1991 Bangladesh census, Dhurong Union had a population of 17,556.
