= Paindong Union =

Coordinates: 22.7138°N 91.7979°E

Paindong Union (Bengali: পাইন্দং) is a union of Fatikchhari Upazila of Chittagong District.

Chairman: Sami Arshad 2024

== Geography ==
- Area : 7,209 acres (29.17 km^{2}.)।

== Location ==
- North: Bhujpur Thana and Manikchhari Upazila
- East: Kanchan nagar Union
- South: Sundarpur Union
- West: Harualchari Union
