= Fatikchhari (disambiguation) =

Fatikchhari is a town in Chittagong District. It may also refer to:

- Fatikchhari Upazila, a upazila in Chittagong District
- Fatikchhari North Upazila, a upazila in Chittagong District
- Fatikchhari Union, a union in Rangamati District
