= Fatikchhari North Upazila =

Upazila in Chittagong Division, Bangladesh

Fatikchhari North উত্তর ফটিকছড়ি
- Upazila
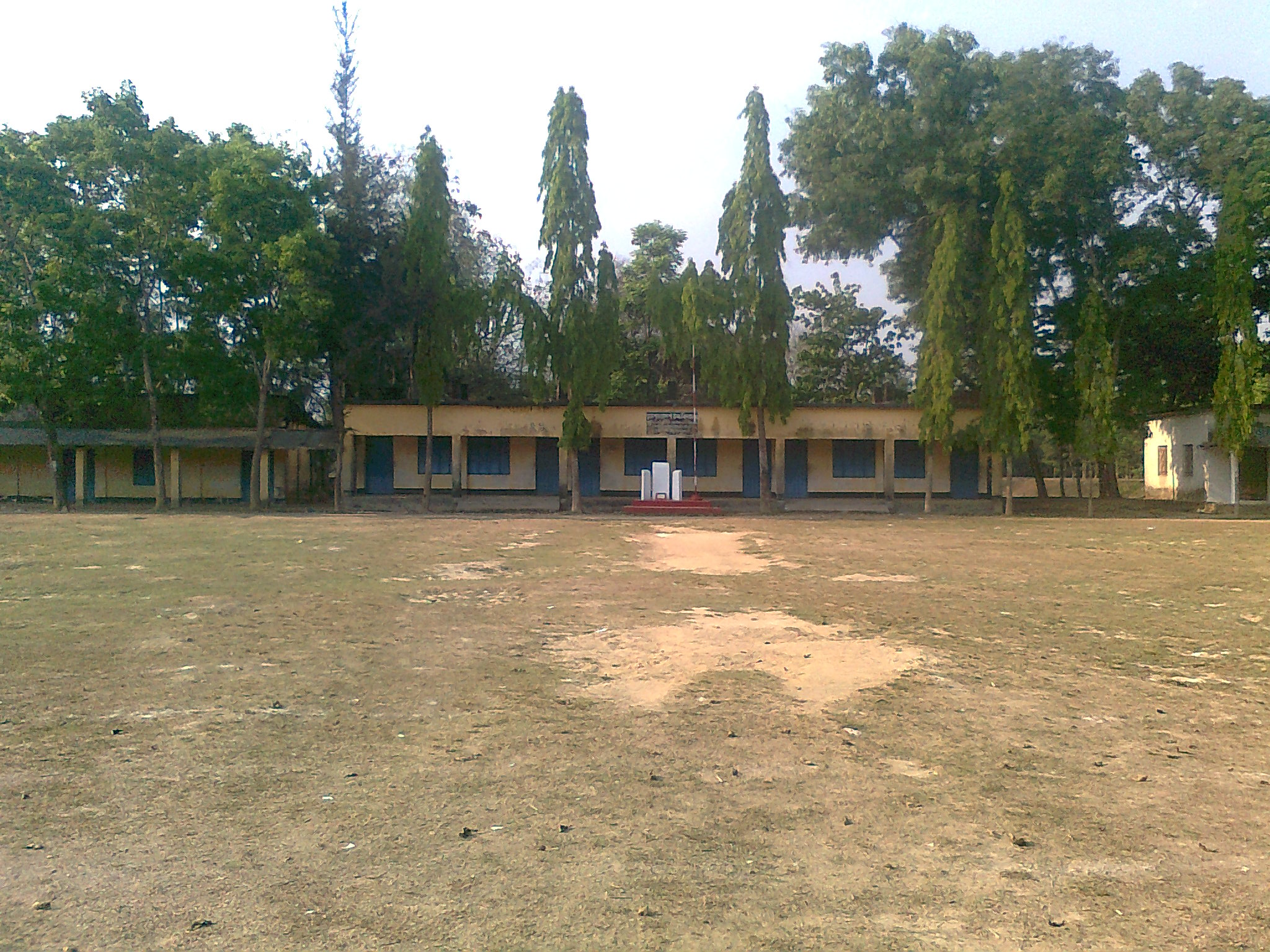
- Bhujpur Model Highschool
- Country: Bangladesh
- Division: Chittagong
- District: Chittagong
- Jatiya Sangsad constituency: Chittagong-2
- Thana: 2007
- Upazila: 2026

Government
  - Body: Upazila Council
  - MP: Sarowar Alamgir
  - Chairman: Vacant

Area
  - Total: 540 km^{2} (210 sq mi)

Population (2022)
  - Total: 252,560
  - Density: 470/km^{2} (1,200/sq mi)
- Time zone: UTC+6 (BST)
- Postal code: 4350
- Area code: 03022

Fatikchhari North (Bengali: উত্তর ফটিকছড়ি) is an upazila of Chittagong District in Chittagong Division, Bangladesh.

== Geography ==
It is surrounded by Tripura (India) to the north, Hathazari and Fatikchhari to the south, Ramgarh and Manikchhari of Khagrachhari District on the east, Mirsharai and Sitakunda Upazilas on the west.

== Administration ==
North Fatikchhari Upazila is divided into 6 union councils. All unions are under Bhujpur Thana. Government approved Bhujpur as headquarter which is in southern part of the upazila. But Locals have been protesting for headquarter in the central of the upazila.

- Bagan Bazar
- Dantmara
- Narayanhat
- Bhujpur
- Harualchari
- Suabil

== Demographics ==
Acvording to 2022 census, total population in six unions of Fatikchhari North Upazila is 252,560. Among them, 215,086 are Muslim, 34,766 are Hindu, 1,769 are Buddhist and 939 are follower of others religions.

Religions in Fatikchhari North Upazila (2022)
Religion	Percent
Islam	85.16%
Hinduism	13.77%
Buddhism	0.70%
Other or not stated	0.37%

Total population of ethnic minorities is 10,698. Among them, 8,759 are Tripura and 1,939 are of other ethnic groups.

Ethnicity in Fatikchhari North Upazila (2022)
1. Bengali (95.8%)
2. Tripura (3.77%)
3. Others (0.77%)

== See also ==
- Bhujpur Thana
- Upazilas of Bangladesh
- Districts of Bangladesh
- Divisions of Bangladesh
- Thanas of Bangladesh
- Union councils of Bangladesh
