= Roshangiri Union =

Coordinates: 22.6153°N 91.8123°E

Roshangiri Union (Bengali: রোসাংগিরি) is a union of Fatikchhari Upazila of Chittagong District.

== Geography ==
Area: 1,723 acres (6.97 km^{2}).

== Location ==
- North: Lelang Union
- East: Samitirhat Union
- South: Hathazari Upazila
- West: Daulatpur Union

== Population ==
In the 1991 Bangladesh census, Roshangiri Union had a population of 7,886.

In the 2018 edition of The National Household Database (NHD), Roshangiri Union had a population about 18,000.
