= Daulatpur Union, Fatikchhari =

Coordinates: 22.6585°N 91.8087°E

Daulatpur (Bengali: দৌলতপুর) is a union of Fatikchhari Upazila in Chittagong District, Bangladesh.

== Geography ==
Area of Daulatpur: 2,871 acres (11.62 km^{2}).

=== Location ===
- North: Nanupur Union
- East: Lelang Union
- South: Jafotnagar Union
- West: Suabil Union

== Population ==
At the 1991 Bangladesh census, Daulatpur union had a population of 25,918 and house units 4454.

== Marketplaces and bazaars ==
1. Baryarhat
2. Nazirhat
3. Fakirhat
4. ABC mini Market
5. Janata club front market

== Villages and mouzas ==
1. Abdul Karim Munshir Bari
2. Foreman'r Bari
3. Dayem chowdhury Bari
4. Mistri'r Bari
5. Chowdhury Bari
6. Boxu Mia Sarker Bari
7. Haji Alhaj Kabir Ahmed Bari, Dainjuri
8. Munshi Altaf Mia Chowdhury House.

== Education ==
1. Daulatpur ABC High School
2. Daulatpur ABC Primary School
3. Gultaz Memorial School & College
4. Syed-Syeda Memorial High School
5. Nazirhat Adarsho High School
6. Nur Ahmed Engineering High School

=== Madrasas ===
1. Syadia Tyabia Madrasa
2. Jamyia Millia Ahmodia kamil Madrasa
3. Zamia Arabiya Nasirul Islam, Nazirhat.

== Notable people ==
- Muhibbullah Babunagari, Bangladeshi Deobandi Islamic Scholar and Key person of Hefazat-e-Islam Bangladesh (born 1935)
- Jamal Uddin Ahmad, Bangladeshi politician and accountant. He served as a Deputy Prime Minister of Bangladesh from 1977 to 1982
