= Manikchhari =

Manikchhari may refer to:

- Manikchhari Upazila, an upazila of Khagrachhari District
- Manikchhari Union, a union of Manikchhari Upazila under Khagrachhari District
