= Bhujpur =

Bhujpur may also refer to:

- Bhujpur Thana, a thana in Chittagong District
- Bhujpur Union, a union in Chittagong District
