= Rangamatia Union =

Rangamatia Union (Bengali: রাঙ্গামাটিয়া) is a union of Fatikchhari Upazila of Chittagong District.

== Geography ==
Area: 7,209 acres (29.17 km^{2})

== Location ==
- North: Kanchan nagar Union
- East: Lelang Union
- South: Daulatpur Union
- West: Sundarpur Union

== Population ==
At the 1991 Bangladesh census, Rangamatia union had a population of 15,628 and house units 2,592.
