= Dhipur Islamia Fazil Madrasah =

School in Tongibari, Munshiganj, Bangladesh

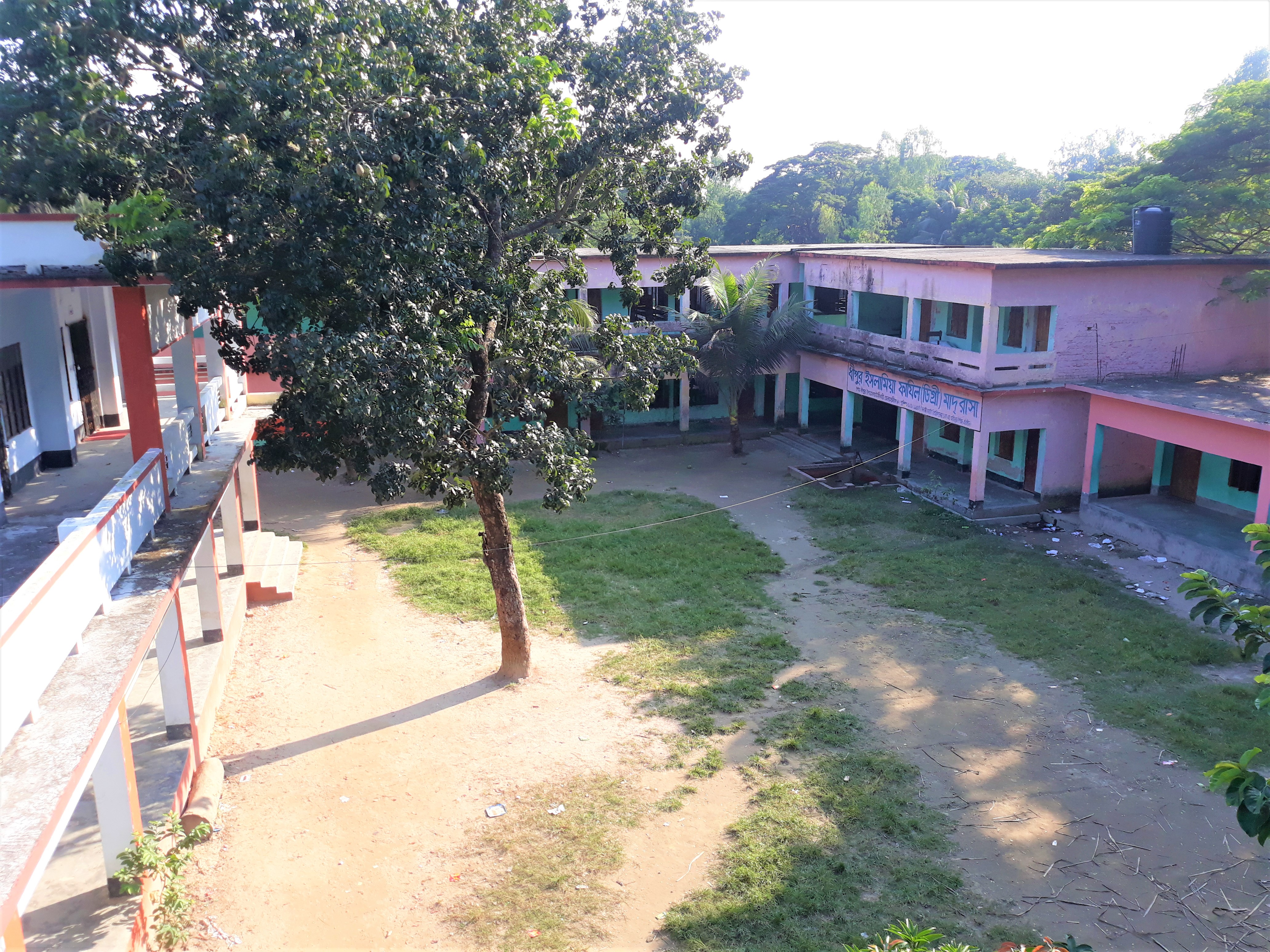
- Academic buildings

Location
- Tongibari; Bangladesh
- Coordinates: 23.4914°N 90.4640°E

Information
- Established: 1 January 1980; 45 years ago
- School district: Munshiganj
- Principal: Mawlana Lutfor Rahman
- Language: Bengali
- Website: 111250.ebmeb.gov.bd
- EIIN: 111250

Dhipur Islamia Fazil Madrasah (Arabic: المدرسة الفاضلية الإسلامية دهيفور, Bengali: ধীপুর ইসলামিয়া ফাযিল মাদরাসা) is a Bangladeshi school located in Tongibari, Munshiganj. It is affiliated with the Islamic University, Kushtia and Islamic Arabic University.

== History ==
The madrasa was first established in Marialoy, later moving to its current location. It is currently located in the village of Dhipur, near Tongi Bari upazila (2 km [1.2 mi] south). The madrasa was established on 1 January 1980.

== Infrastructure ==
There are 5 two-storied buildings with 26 rooms, a computer lab, a science lab, 2 tube wells and 3 toilets in the madrasah. The school premises is approximately 0.90 hectares (2.22 acres).

=== Computer Lab ===
The Sheikh Russell Digital Lab was provided by the government of Bangladesh in order to educate students on Information Technology. Here, classes are conducted using a variety of media in order to improve student engagement with academic content. There are also arrangements for admission to various computer learning courses within the school and in outside institutions.

== Result ==
#	Exam name	year	Passing rate
1	EEC	2018	100%
2	JDC	2018	95.56%
3	Dakhil	2019	80.77%
4	Alim	2019	88.89%
5	Fazil	2019	100%

== Gallery ==
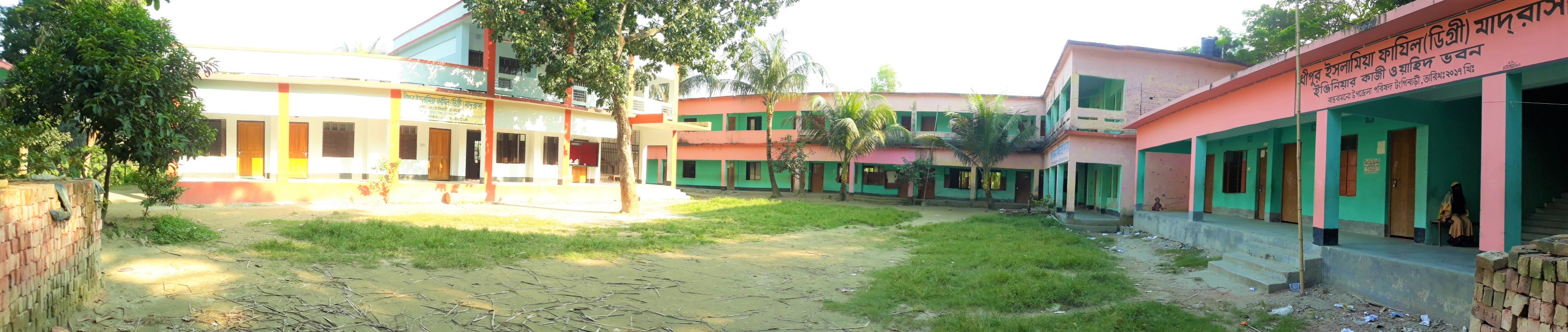
Views of Dhipur Islamia Fazil Madrasa, Tongbari, Munshiganj
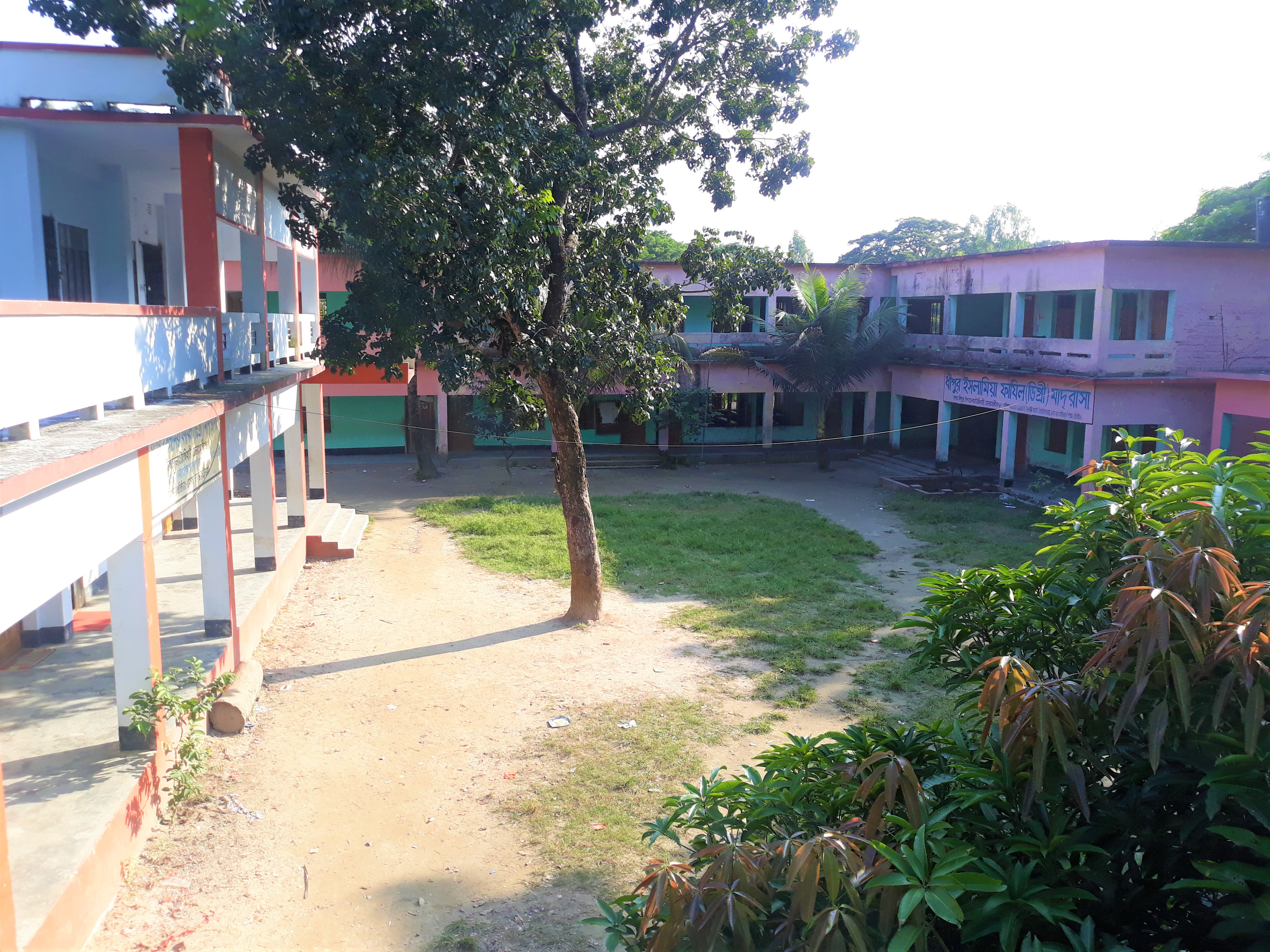
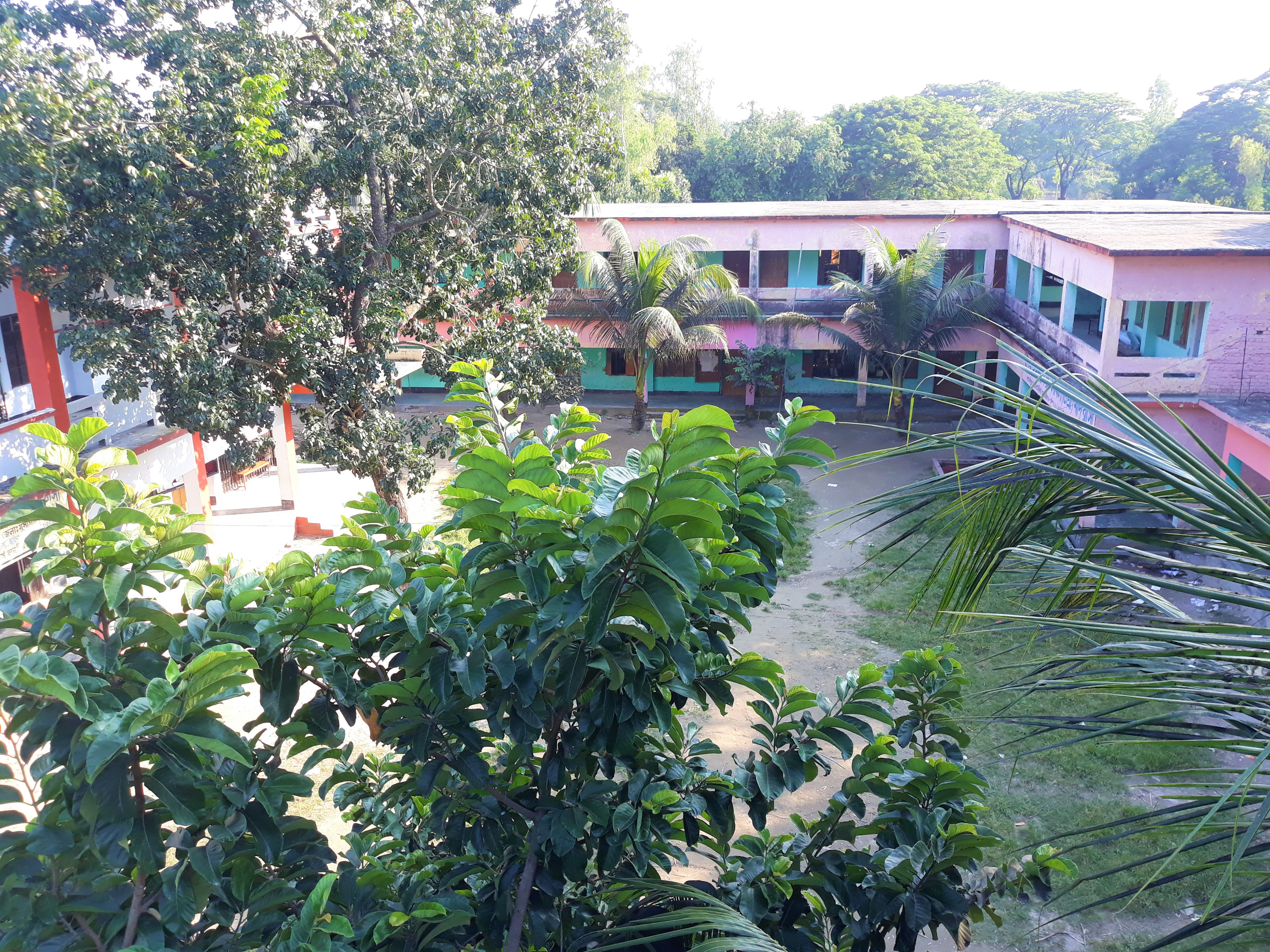
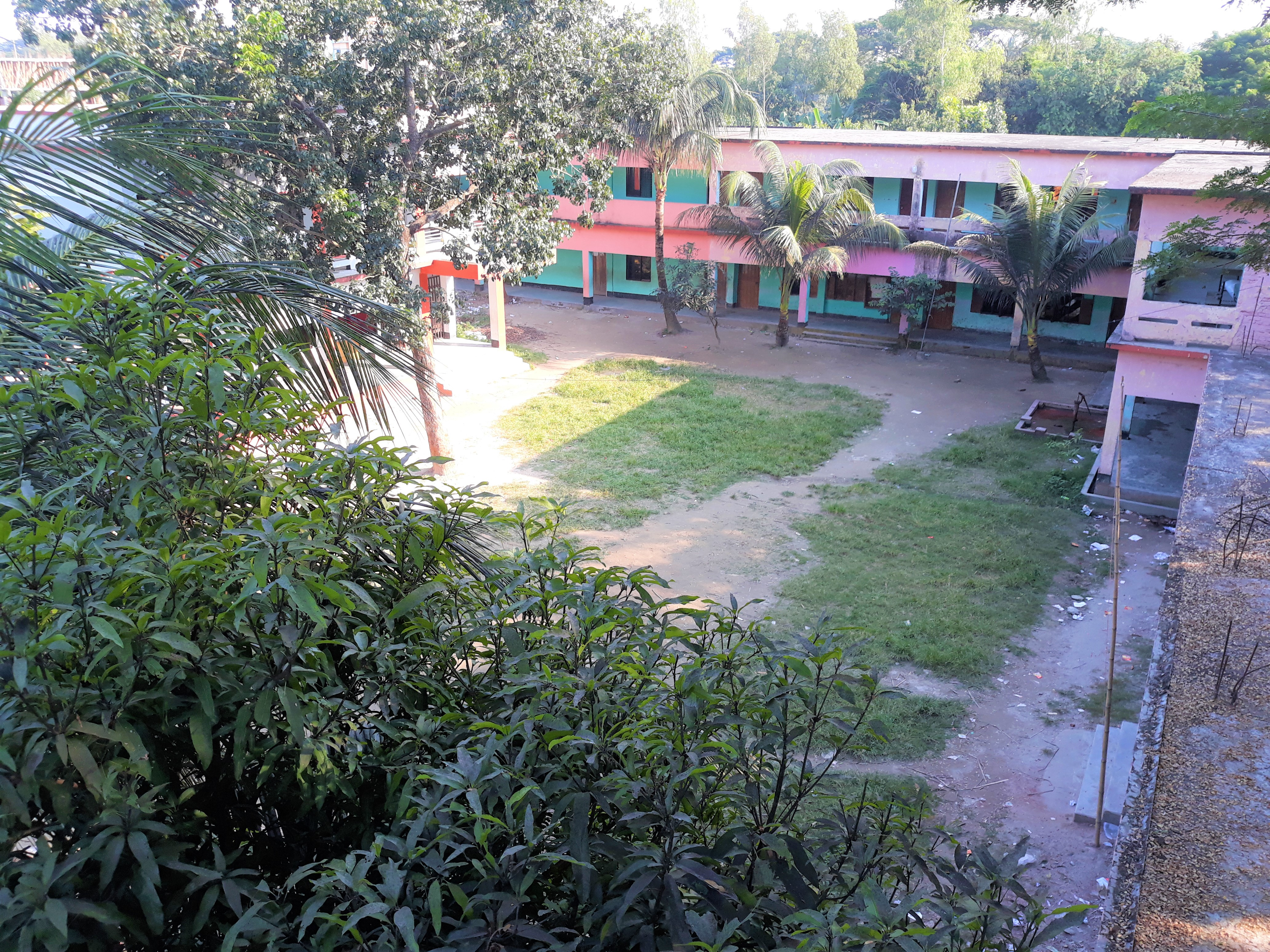
Below are three pictures from the roof of the Dhipur Islamia Ideal Orphanage building

== See also ==
- Madrasa
- Qawmi Madrasah
- Government Madrasah-e-Alia
