= Sundarpur Union =

Coordinates: 22.6886°N 91.7754°E

Sundarpur Union (Bengali: সুন্দরপুর) is a union parishad of Fatikchhari Upazila of Chittagong District.

== Geography ==
Area: 2,599 acres (10.52 km^{2})

== Location ==
- North: Bhujpur Thana
- East: Rangamatia Union
- South: Suabil Union
- West: Harualchari Union

== Population ==
At the 1991 Bangladesh census, Sundarpur Union had a population of 16,949.
