= Samitirhat Union =

Samitirhat Union (Bengali: সমিতিরহাট) is a union of Fatikchhari Upazila of Chittagong District.

== Geography ==
Samitirhat has an area of 2,601 acres (10.53 km^{2}).

== Location ==
- North: Nanupur Union
- East: Jafotnagar Union
- South: Hathazari Upazila
- West: Roshangiri Union

== Population ==
At the 1991 Bangladesh census, Samitirhat Union had a population of 15,502.
