= Mirerkhil, Bhujpur union =

Village in Bhujupur, Bangladesh

Coordinates: 22.7438°N 91.7508°E

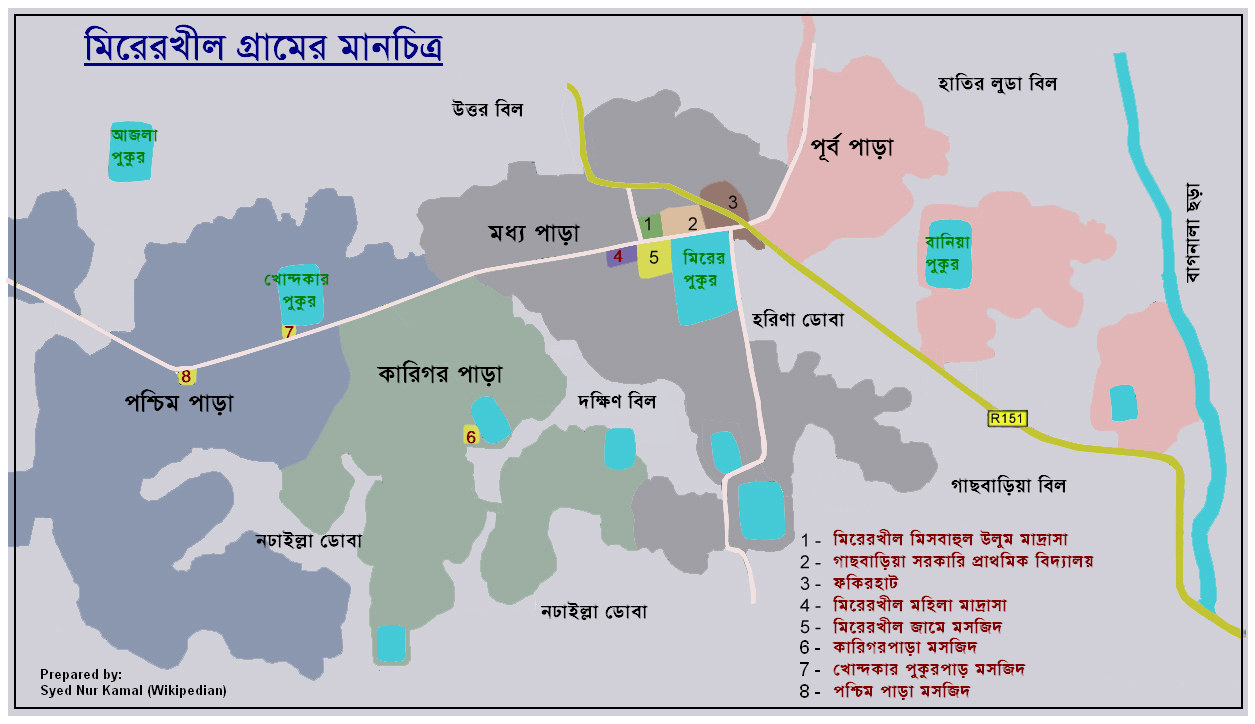
Map of Mirerkhil Village

Mirer khil (Bengali: মিরের খীল) is a village of Bhujpur union in Bangladesh. 49 km from Chittagong city the village is some part of East Bhujpur mouza and some part of Fakirachang mouza.

== Etymology ==
In Bengali language, "Mirer" means of the Mir and "Khil" is a Sanskrit word, meaning wasteland, uncultivated fallow farmland or farmhouse. In Nāradasmṛti, khil meaning that land, which is not cultivated for three years. The meaning of Mirerkhil is “the uncultivated Farmland of Mirs”.

== Geography ==
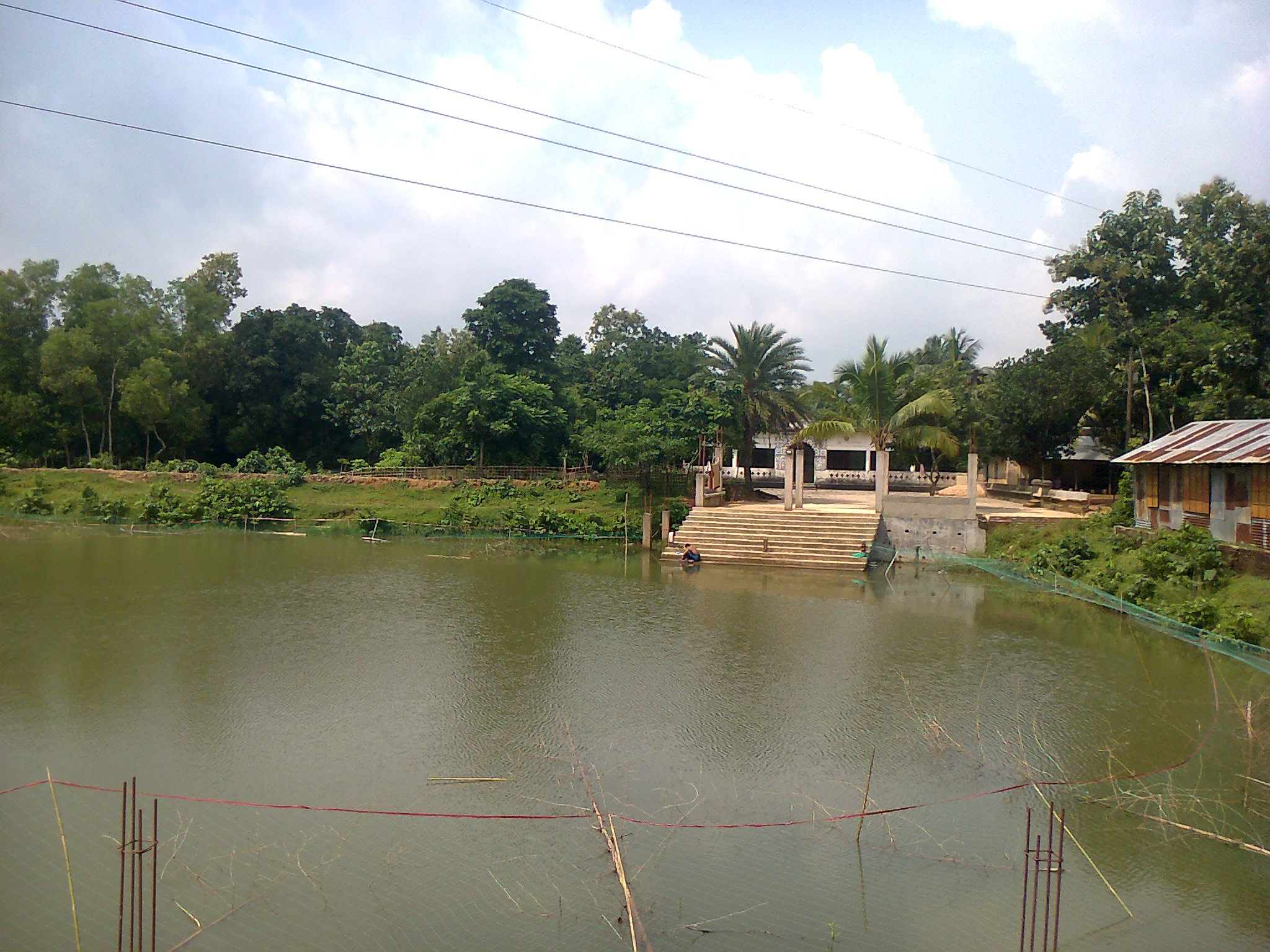
Mirer Pukur (Water Tank) & Mirerkhil Jame Mosque

The village Mirerkhil is situated between two hills, Sitakunda hill and hills of Chittagong hill tracts. Village is bounded by Green paddy fields, water tanks and large Nodhailla Dhoba. Famous river of Chittagong district Halda River is flowing outer skirt of village. Village's direct angular distance from Bay of Bengal is 22 km and Sitakunda hills situated between sea and the village. Amtali village is to north, in east side Fakirachang village and in west side is Azimpur Mouza. There are some water tanks by name Mirer Pukur, Khondakar Pukur, Azala Pukr & Bania Pukur of pre British period available in the village.

== History ==
As per known history the village is named after zamindar of the area Mir Muhammad Sana. Local peoples call Mirer Pukur the tank which is situated in front of the Mirerkhil Jame mosque. The area is mentioned in old records as Taraf Mir Muhammad Sana but CS Cadestral Survey mentioned the area as Gasbaria. Gasbaria Primary School & Gasbaria field is bearing memory of that.

== Population ==
Population of the village is approx. 1300.

== Educational and other institutions ==
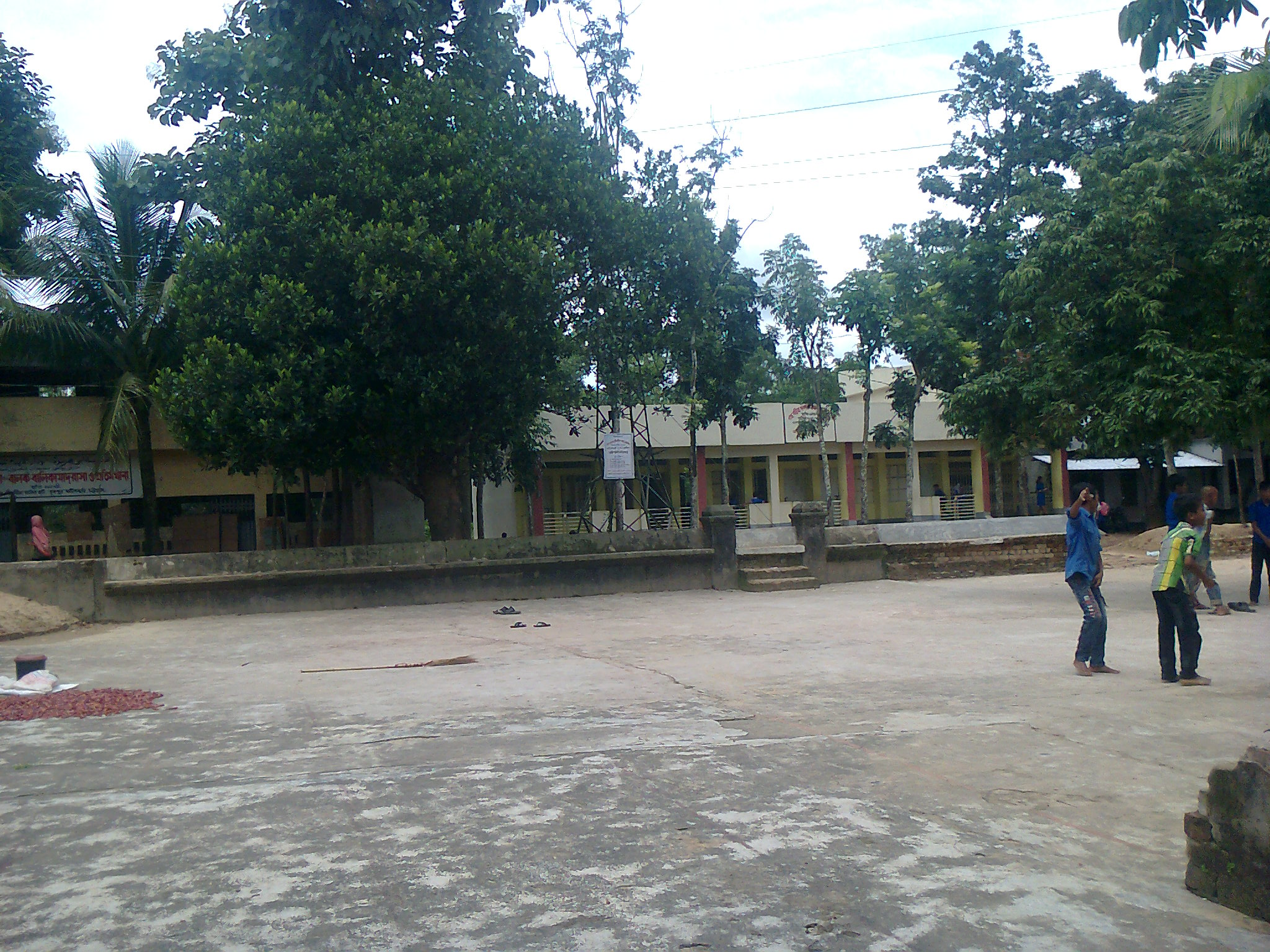
Gasbaria Gov’t Primary School, part of Mirerkhil Abu Horaira Madrassa and a part of Mirerkhil Eidgah

There is a government Primary School, a Madrassa, a women's Madrassa, three mosques and a Jame Mosque in the village.

- Gasbaria Primary School
- Mirerkhil Abu Horaira Madrassah
- Mirerkhil Mahila Madrassah
- Mirerkhil Jame Mosque

== Communication ==
Regional Highway “R151” (48 km long) touched Mirerkhil when it meets with Dhaka-Chittagong national highway at Baroiar Hat via Heako. Busses travel Fakir Hat from Chittagong city Oxygen Bus Stand in every hour.

== Marketplaces and bazars ==
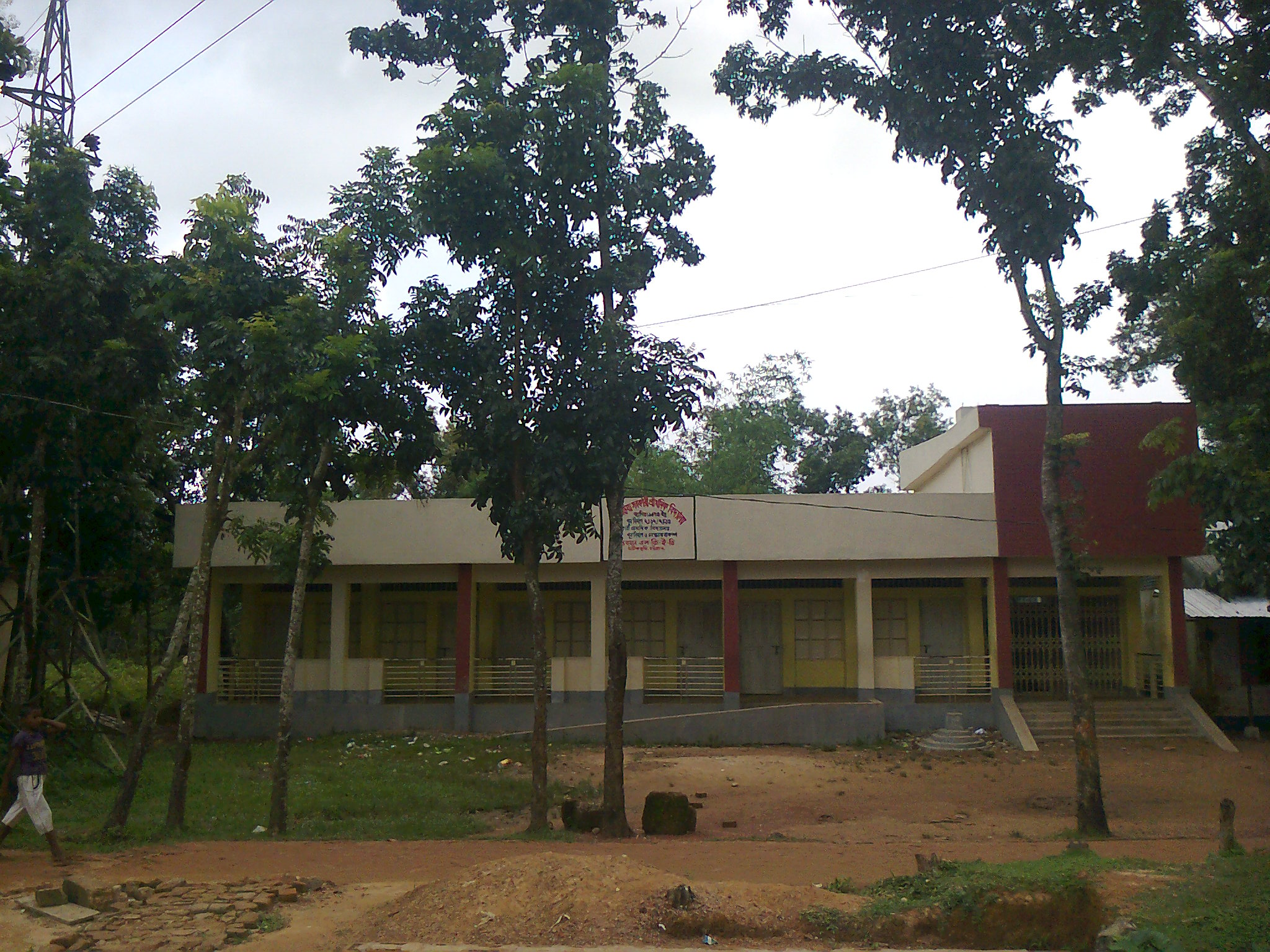
Gasbaria Gov’d Primary School

Fakir Hat is the main marketplace in the village. Distance between Chittagong city and Fakir Hat is 49 km.

== See also ==
- List of villages in Bangladesh
