= Ghagra Union =

Ghagra Union is an administrative subdivision in Bangladesh. It may refer to:

- Ghagra Union, Kawkhali, a union in Rangamati District, Bangladesh
- Ghagra Union, Purbadhala, a union in Netrokona District, Bangladesh
