= Betka Union =

Coordinates: 23.546°N 90.460°E

Betka Union is a union parishad under Tongibari Upazila of Munshiganj District in the Dhaka Division of central Bangladesh. It covers an area of 8.94 square kilometres (3.45 sq mi).

== Demographics ==
The population includes 11,459 males and 9,376 females.

== Infrastructure ==
The area hosts a post office, two banks and an ATM booth along with a market.

== Health ==
Two community health centers are located there.

== Agriculture ==
The area hosts 37 Arat of Potatoes, 5 Arat of Betel Nut and 4 Potatoes Cold Storages

== Roads ==
Roads cover 32400 km of roads. 5,400 km are paved, 1,000 km are brick and the remaining 26,002 km are dirt.

== Villages and population ==
- Chotfotiya - 226
- Uttor Rayapura - 852
- Sundalpura - 805
- Gorkula - 127
- Pirate Mahamudatpur - 546
- North Betka - 4,487
- Khilpara - 3,172
- South Betka - 2,304
- Changuri - 2,091
- Randhonibari - 1,295
- Kandapara -
- Dwipara -
- South Raypur - 605

== Education ==
=== Government primary schools ===
Serial N.	Name	pass rate	Head Teacher / Principal	Location
01	Chotfotiya Government primary school	100%	Roma Rani Pal	Betka Union, Tongibari
02	Uttor rayapura Government primary school	100%	Asma Akter	Betka Union, Tongibari
03	Betka Poschim Para Government primary school	95%	Norin Akter	Betka Union, Tongibari
04	Uttor Betka Government primary school	100%	Rahena Bagom	Betka Union, Tongibari
05	Randhonibari Government primary school	100%	Sajeda Akter	Betka Union, Tongibari
06	Dhipara Government primary school	100%	Songkor Kumar Dash	Betka Union, Tongibari
07	Changuri Government primary school	100%	Raseda Akter	Betka Union, Tongibari
08	Khilpara Government primary school	100%	MD.Abdul Hok	Betka Union, Tongibari

| 09 ||Dokkhin Betka Government primary school

=== Secondary And Higher Secondary Schools ===
- Betka Union High School
- Paik Para Union High School

=== Madrasas ===
- Betka Darulalom Kawmia Madrasah
- Uttor Raipur Siddikia Abdul Islamia Dakhil Madrasah
- Uttar Sunarong Darul Ulum Madrasa
- Dakshin Betka D Muhammed Hossain Islamia Hafijiya Madrasa And Etim Khana
- Changuri Hafijiya Nurani Madrasa O Etim Khana

== Religion ==
The area supports 31 mosques, including:

- Khilpara Baitul Aman Jame Mosque
- Betka Bazar Jame Mosque
- Big Chatfatia Jame Mosque
- Chatfatia Jame Mosque
- Char MahamudatPur Jame Mosque
- Uttar Raipur Jame Mosque
- Uttar Sunarong Jame Masjid
- Natun Bazar Jame Masjid
- Hawlader Bari Baitun Noor Jame Masjid
- Changuri Central Jame Mosque
- Changuri Nur Mohammadi Al-Aiksa Jame Mosque
- East Changuri Baitun Noor Jame Masjid

== Orphanages ==
- Dakshin Betka D Muhammed Hossain Islamia Hafijiya Madrasa And Etim Khana
- Changuri Hafizia Nurani Madrasa And Etim Khana

== See also ==
- Upazilas of Bangladesh
- Districts of Bangladesh
- Divisions of Bangladesh
