= Jafatnagar Union =

Jafatnagar Union (Bengali: জাফতনগর) is a union parishad of Fatikchhari Upazila of Chittagong District.

== Geography ==
Jafatnagar Union has a total area of 6.32 square kilometres (1,562 acres). It borders Baktapur Union to the north, Dharmapur Union to the northeast, Abdullapur Union to the east, Raozan Upazila to the southeast, Hathazari Upazila to the southwest, and Samitirhat Union to the west.

== Population ==
According to the 2011 Bangladesh census, Jafatnagar Union had 2,659 households and a population of 20,313, 10.7% of whom lived in urban areas.

== Education ==
- Isapur BMC Degree College, Jahangpur
- Latif Rahaman High School, Fathepur
- Jahanpur Amzad Ali Abdul Hadi Institution
- Jahanara Momtaz Girls High School, Fathepur
