= Dharmapur Union, Fatikchhari =

Union council of Fatikchhari Upazila in Chittagong District

Coordinates: 22.6036°N 91.8694°E

Dharmapur (Bengali: ধর্মপুর) is a union of Fatikchhari Upazila of Chittagong District, Bangladesh.

== Geography ==
Area of Dharmapur: 3,719 acres (15.05 km^{2}).

=== Location ===
- North: Nanupur Union
- East: Raozan Upazila
- South: Raozan Upazila,
- West: Baktapur and Jafotnagar Unions

== Population ==
As of 1991 Bangladesh census, Dharmapur union has a population of 20,168 and house units 3469.

== Marketplaces and bazars ==
Azadi bazar is the main marketplace of the Union. Ramju Monsir Hat is another historical market in this area, adjacent to Dharmapur Multilateral High School.

== Education ==
There are many educational institutions in this union, including:

- Dharmapur Amdadul Ulum Madrasha
- Dharmapur KG School
- Dharmapur Multilateral High School
- Dharmapur Komol Krishna Balika High School
- Mamodhamoi Govt Primary School
- North Dharmapur High School
- Azadibazar Madrasha
- Hazrat Zaber (R) Islamic Academy
- Rahmania Senior Madrasha
- Sultanul Ulum Madrasa
- West Dharmapur Govt Primary School
- Dharmapur Judge Bari Govt Primary School
- F.R. Idial Kindergarten
- Al Ansar Islami Academy
- Darul Koran Islami Academy (best-known educational institution)
- Alimulla Govt. Primary School
- Haji Mosharaf Ali Primary School
- South Dharmapur Forkania Madrasah

and others.
