= Dantmara Union =

Union in Chittagong Division, Bangladesh

Dantmara Union (Bengali: দাঁতমারা) is a union parishad of Fatikchhari North Upazila of Chittagong District, Bangladesh. It has an area of 23,474 acres (95 km^{2}) and had a population of 75,000 in 2011. Baganbazar Union lies to the north, Manikchhari Upazila to the east, Narayanhat Union to the south and the Sitakunda mountain range to the west.

== Education ==
- Dantmara A.B.Z Sikder High School (established 1967)
- Heako Banani High School
- Balutila Ideal High School
- Santirhat High School
- Hasnabad Madinatul Arab High School
- Heako Banani Degree College
- Dantmara Dakhil Madrases
- Heako Rahmania Dakhil Madrasha
- Balutila Islamia Dakhil Madrasha
- Hasnabad Ahsanul Ulum Islamia Dakhil Madrasha
- Boro Betua Government Primary School - (বড় বেতুয়া সরকারি প্রাথমিক বিদ্যালয়)
- Balutila Government Primary School
- Heako Government Primary School
- Dantmara Government Primary School
- Santirhat Government Primary School
- Jiltoli Government Primary School

== Mosque-মসজিদ ==
- কাঞ্চনা জামে মসজিদ
- বড় বেতুয়া জামে মসজিদ
- আধারিয়া টিলা জামে মসজিদ
- নিচিন্তা জামে মসজিদ
- কছিমারখিল আল-কারিম জামে মসজিদ
- শান্তিরহাট বাজার জামে মসজিদ

== Villages and mouzas ==
- Kanchana - কাঞ্চনা
- Fulchari
- Purbo Sonai
- Banglapara
- Heako Purbo Para
- Heako (Chowdhury Para)
- Boro Betua
- Bandermara
- Dantmara
- Sadinagar
- Santirhat
- Hasnabad
- Gorkata
- Nurpur
- Tarakho
- Kalakum
- Jiltoli
- Morakoyla
- Balukhali
- Islampur
- Chapatoli
