= Tintahari Union =

Union of Khagrachhari District, Chittagong, Bangladesh

Tintahari তিনটহরী
- Union
- Interactive map of Tintahari
- Country: Bangladesh
- Division: Chittagong Division
- District: Khagrachhari District
- Upazila: Manikchhari Upazila

Population (2022)
  - Total: 19,589
- Time zone: UTC+6 (BST)
- Postal code: 4460
- Website: tintahariup.khagrachhari.gov.bd

Tintahari Union is a union of Manikchhari Upazila under Khagrachhari District.

== Demography ==
According to 2022 census, total population of the Union are 19,589. Among them, 14,404 are Muslim, 3,693 are Buddhist, 1,478 are Hindu, 4 are Christian and 10 are follower of others religion.

Religion-2022
1. Islam (73.5%)
2. Buddhism (18.9%)
3. Hinduism (7.55%)
4. Christianity (0.02%)
5. Others (0.05%)

== Ethnicity ==
This Union is home to a variety of different ethnic groups. Among them, 15,573 are Bengali, 3,182 are Marma, 459 are Tripura, 319 are Chakma and 56 are of others ethnic groups.

Ethnicity-2022
1. Bengali (79.5%)
2. Marma (16.2%)
3. Tripura (2.34%)
4. Chakma (1.63%)
5. Others (0.29%)
