= Narayanhat Union =

Union in Chittagong Division, Bangladesh

Narayanhat Union (Bengali: নারায়ণহাট) is a union of Fatikchhari North Upazila of Chittagong District.

== Geography ==
Area of Narayanhat : 14,800 acres (59.9 km^{2}.)।

== Location ==
- North: Dantmara Union
- East: Manikchhari Upazila
- South: Bhujpur Union
- West: Sitakunda Mountain Range and Mirsarai Upzillah

== Population ==
At the 1991 Bangladesh census, Narayanhat Union had a population of 23,370.

== Education ==
- Narayanhat Degree College.
- Narayanhat (Collegiate) High School
- Narayanhat Senior Madrasa.
- Narayanhat (Chanpur) High School
- Shatchora Govt Primary School
- Narayanhat Govt. Primary School
- Jujkhola Govt. Primary School
- Mirzarhat High School.
- Idilpur Govt. Primary school
- Mohanagar Reg. Primary School
- Sahtchora Hedaytul Islam Madrasa

== Marketplaces and bazaars ==
Narayanhat and Mirzarhat is the main marketplace in the union. Shatchora bazar

== Villages and mouzas ==
Idilpur, Chanpur, Dhamarkhil, Shouilkopa, South Jujkhola, North Jujkhola, Hapania, Sundarpur. West Chandpur Shatchora.
