= Subrata Barua =

Bangladeshi writer

- Born: 1 January 1946 (age 80); Chattogram, British India
- Education: Chittagong College; Dhaka University
- Awards: Bangla Academy Literary Award (1983); Ekushey Padak (2018)

Subrata Barua (born 1 January 1946) is a Bangladeshi writer. He was awarded Bangla Academy Literary Award in 1983. In recognition of his contribution to Bengali language and literature, the government of Bangladesh awarded him the country's second highest civilian award Ekushey Padak in 2018. He served as the director of the Bangla Academy.

== Early life ==
Barua was born on 1 January 1946 at Chilonia village under Fatikchhari Upazila in Chattogram District of the then British India (now Bangladesh). He completed his Secondary School Certificate from Chittagong Municipal Model High School in 1961 and Higher Secondary School Certificate in 1963 from Chittagong College. He graduated from the same college in physics in 1966 and earned his post graduate degree from Dhaka University in 1968.

== Awards ==
- Agrani Bank Shishu Academy Children's Literature Award (1981, 1984, 1987)
- Bangla Academy Literary Award (1983)
- Chittagong Science Council Gold Medal (1997)
- Ekushey Padak (2018)
