= Kalampati Union =

Union of Rangamati District, Chittagong, Bangladesh

Kalampati কলমপতি
- Union
- Interactive map of Kalampati
- Country: Bangladesh
- Division: Chittagong Division
- District: Rangamati District
- Upazila: Kawkhali Upazila

Area
  - Total: 59.57 km^{2} (23.00 sq mi)

Population (2022)
  - Total: 15,892
  - Density: 266.8/km^{2} (691.0/sq mi)
- Time zone: UTC+6 (BST)
- Postal code: 4510
- Website: kalampatiup.rangamati.gov.bd

Kalampati Union is a union of Kawkhali Upazila, Rangamati under Rangamati District.

== Demography ==
According to 2022 census, total population of the Union are 15,892. Among them, 7,908 are Muslim, 7,574 are Buddhist, 388 are Hindu and 22 are Christian.

Religion-2022
1. Islam (49.8%)
2. Buddhism (47.7%)
3. Hinduism (2.44%)
4. Christianity (0.14%)
5. Others (0.00%)

== Ethnicity ==
This Union is home to a variety of different ethnic groups. Among them, 8,394 are Bengali, 1,132 are Chakma, 6,318 are Marma and 48 are of others ethnic groups.

Ethnicity-2022
1. Bengali (52.8%)
2. Marma (39.8%)
3. Chakma (7.12%)
4. Others (0.30%)
