= Fatikchhari Upazila =

Upazila in Chittagong Division, Bangladesh

Fatikchhari ফটিকছড়ি
- Upazila
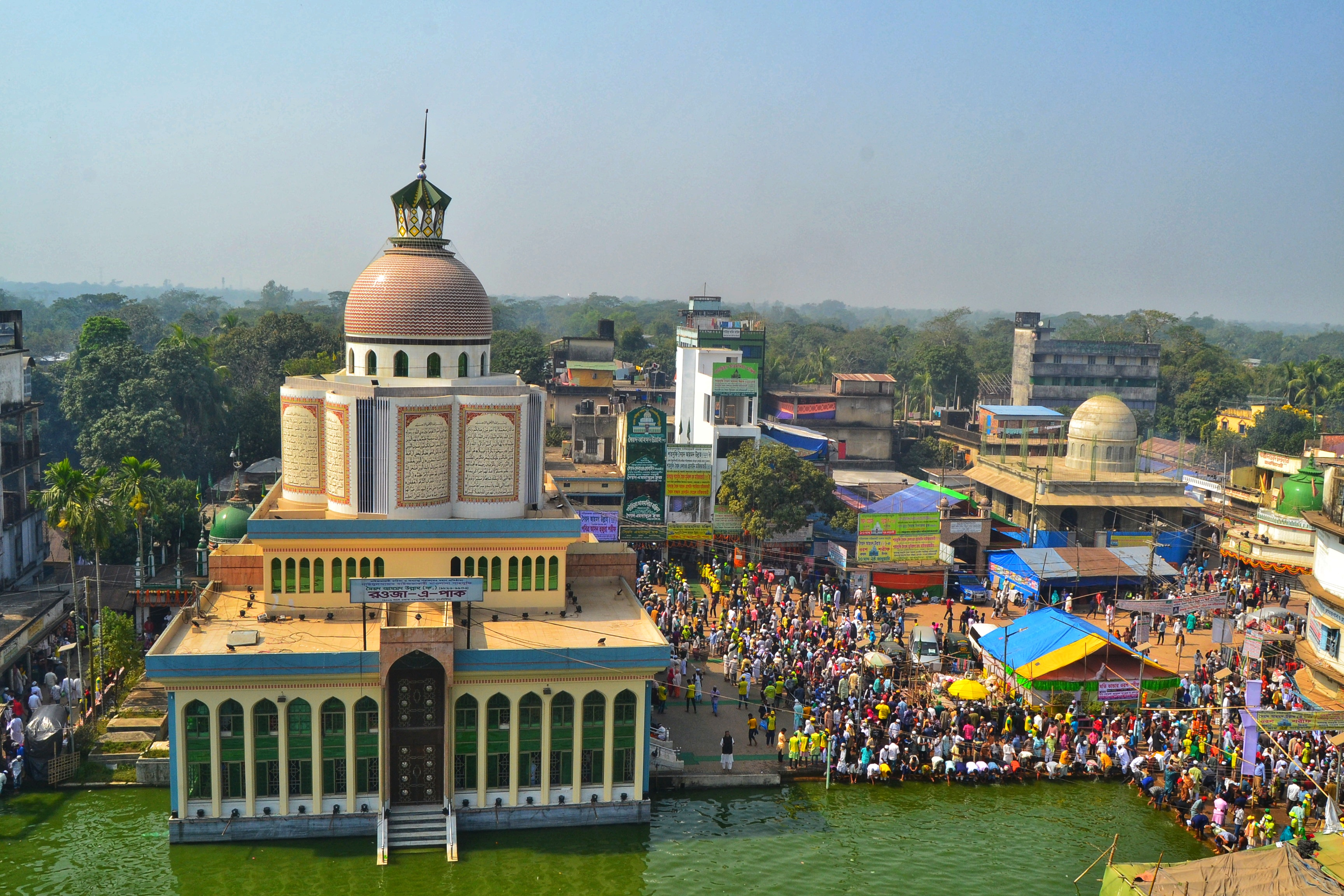
- Maizbhandar Darbar Sharif

- Coordinates: 22.6840°N 91.7893°E
- Country: Bangladesh
- Division: Chittagong
- District: Chittagong
- Jatiya Sangsad constituency: Chittagong-2
- Thana: 1918
- Upazila: 1980
- Headquarters: Fatikchhari

Government
  - Body: Upazila Council
  - MP: Sarowar Alamgir
  - Chairman: Vacant
  - Chief Executive Officer: Md. Mozammel Haque Chowdhury

Area
  - Total: 773.13 km^{2} (298.51 sq mi)

Population (2022)
  - Total: 642,089
  - Density: 830.51/km^{2} (2,151.0/sq mi)
- Time zone: UTC+6 (BST)
- Postal code: 4350
- Area code: 03022
- Website: www.fatikchhari.chittagong.gov.bd

Fatikchhari Upazila mauza geocode map

Fatikchhari (Bengali: ফটিকছড়ি, romanized: Fôṭikchhôṛi) is an upazila of Chittagong District in Chittagong Division, Bangladesh. It is the largest upazila of Chittagong.

== History ==
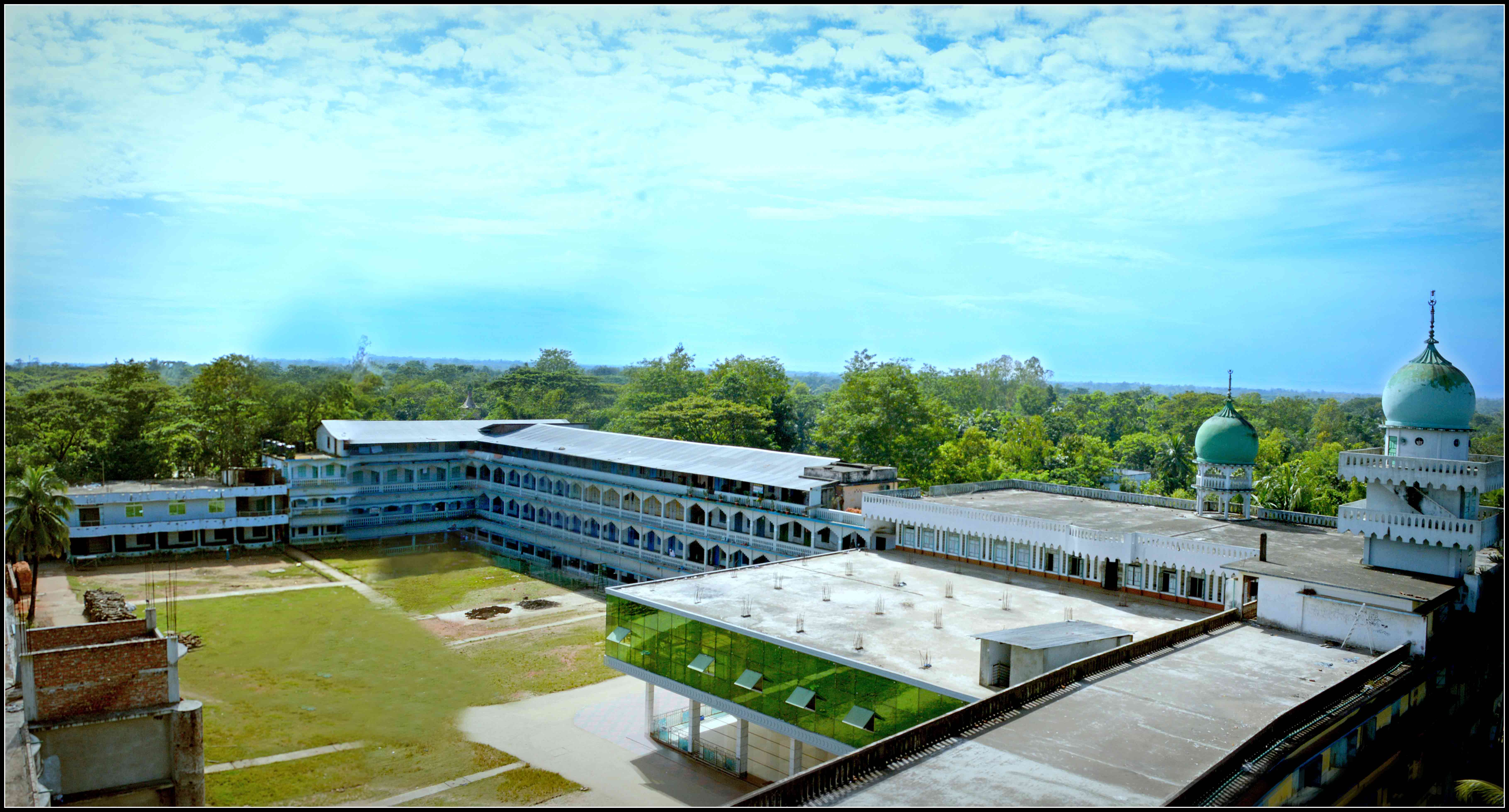
Al-Jamiah Al-Islamiah Obaidia Nanupur was established by Shah Amiruddin in 1957.

The Fatikchhari Jami al-Uloom Fazil Madrasa and the Jamia Arabia Nasirul Islam Madrasa were founded in 1904 and 1912 respectively, transforming Fatikchhari into an important site of spiritual activities in the country. During the British colonial period, a thana was formed in Fatikchhari in 1918. In 1928, the Nanupur Sunnia Madrasa was established.

During the Bangladesh Liberation War, a training camp was founded in Fatikchhari by Mustafizur Rahman Siddiqi, Ziaur Rahman and Zonal Commander Mirza Abu Mansur in March 1971. Bengali freedom fighters around Chittagong that used to go to India for training purposes would return through there and Fatikchhari alone was home to roughly 1,500 Bengali freedom fighters. Thus Fatikchhari was regarded as the gateway to freedom fighters. Subsequently, the Abu Subhan School playground in Nanupur became a refugee camp. Mass graves were dug in Dantmara, Began Bazar, Darbar Sharif and Lelang Tea Garden.

== Geography ==
It is one of the largest upazilas of Bangladesh. It is a fertile valley between the Sitakunda Hills and the Hills of the Chittagong Hill Tracts. These two hill ranges become one at the northernmost point of the upazila and they widen apart as they proceed southwards. There is no particular geographical place in the upazila called Fatikchhari, rather the entire upazila takes its name from one small all-season rivulet known as Fatikchhari Khal that originates in the Sitakundu Hills on the West and enters the Upazila at Bhujpur Union before joining the River Halda, the longest river in Fatikchhari Upazila that runs through the upazila along almost its entire length. Dhurung is its second longest river. There are some small rivers (khals) originating from the hills both on the eastern and western flanks, all being tributaries of the Halda flowing southwards to the sea. Among them are Gazaria, Fatikchhari, Baramasia, Mandakini, Balukhali etc. In between the two hill ranges, Fatikchhari consists of flat farmland annually affected by flash floods caused by heavy rainfall in the hilly catchment areas and the water being drained by several small rivers and the Halda.

It is surrounded by Tripura (India) to the north, Hathazari and Kawkhali Upazila (Rangamati District) to the south, Ramgarh, Manikchhari, Lakshmichhari, and Raozan Upazilas on the east, Mirsharai and Sitakunda Upazilas on the west.

== Demographics ==
Religions in Fatikchhari Upazila (2022)
Religion	Percent
Islam	88.77%
Hinduism	9.72%
Buddhism	1.35%
Other or not stated	0.16%

According to the 2022 Bangladeshi census, Fatikchhari Upazila had 142,906 households and a population of 642,089. 10.71% of the population were under 5 years of age. Fatikchhari had a literacy rate (age 7 and over) of 76.11%: 78.16% for males and 74.24% for females, and a sex ratio of 93.18 males for every 100 females. 167,870 (26.14%) lived in urban areas. Ethnic population was 12,877 (2.01%), of which 8,991 were Tripura and 1313 Chakma.

As of the 2011 Census of Bangladesh, Fatikchhari upazila had 100,009 households and a population of 526,003. 126,792 (24.10%) were under 10 years of age. Fatikchhari had an average literacy rate of 51.35%, compared to the national average of 51.8%, and a sex ratio of 1025 females per 1000 males. 41,994 (7.98%) of the population lived in urban areas. Ethnic population was 11,919 (2.27%), of which Tripura were 6,857 and Chakma 1,038.

According to the 1991 Bangladesh census, Fatikchhari had a population of 388,013, in 65,861 households. Males constituted 50.1% of the population, and females 49.9%. The population aged 18 or over was 182,250. Fatikchhari had an average literacy rate of 32% (7+ years), against the national average of 32.4% literate.

Ethnicity in Fatikchhari (2022)
1. Bengali (98.0%)
2. Tripura (1.40%)
3. Others (0.61%)

Around 88% of the population are Bengali Muslims with around 10% adhering to Hinduism and around 9,000 adherents to Buddhism. There are around 3,000 followers of ethnic religions. There are populations of Tripuris, Chakmas and Mog but it is decreasing as more and more are migrating to the nearby semi-autonomous region of the Chittagong Hill Tracts. There are also the Manipuris and Oriyas who were brought over by the British during the nineteenth century to work as tea garden labourers.

=== Facilities ===
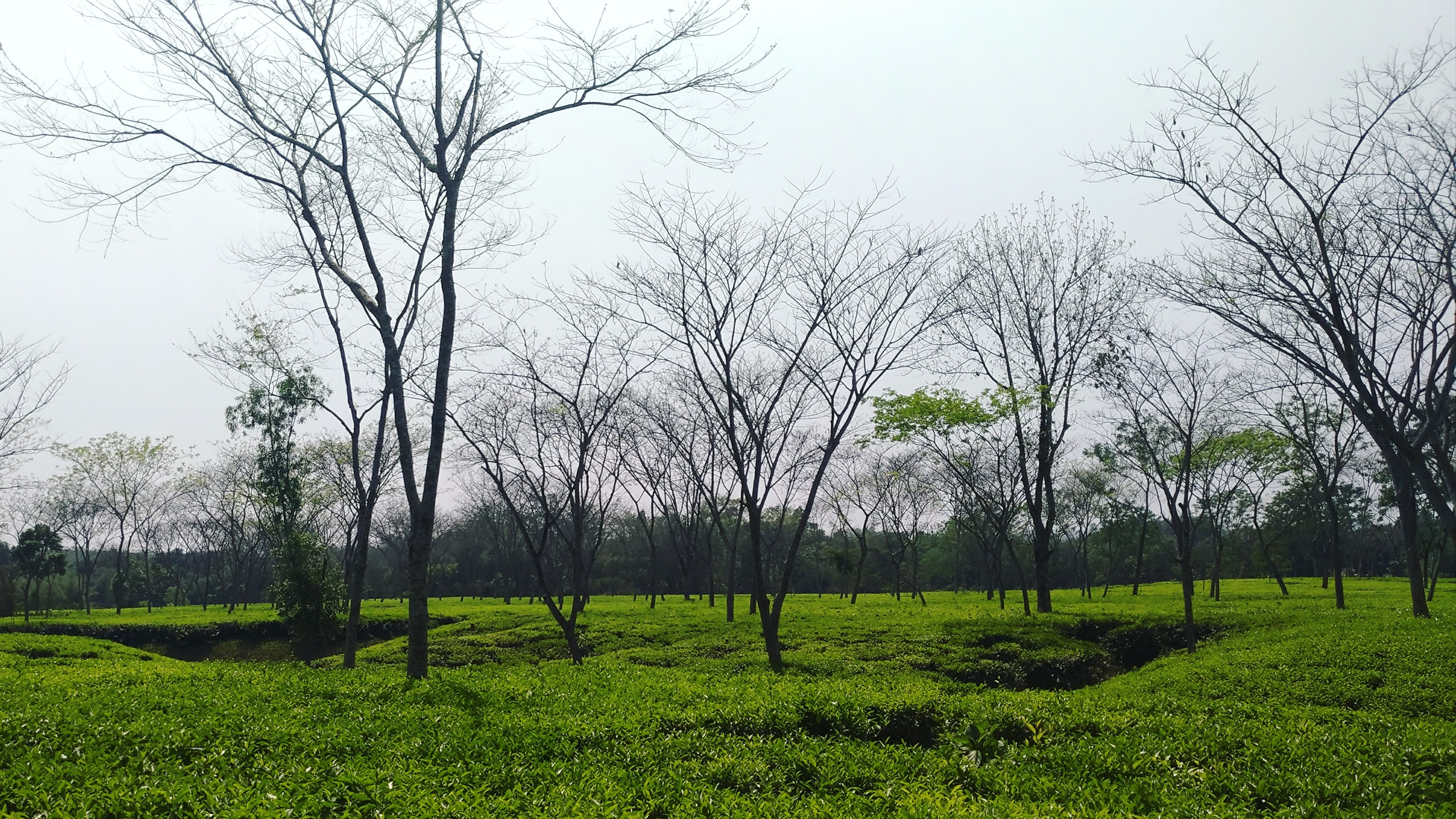
The Halda valley tea garden.

The Fatikchhari Upazila also has 7 orphanages which take care of orphan children and educate them. These include:

1. Muniria Islamia Orphanage & Madrasa
2. Talimuddin Orphanage & Madrasa
3. Munafkhil Uloom Hafizia Orphanage & Madrasa
4. Chaumuhani Bazar Orphanage & Madrasa
5. Manirul Uloom Hafezia Orphanage & Madrasa
6. Mawlana Burhan ad-Din Shah Orphanage
7. Imam Ghazzali Orphanage and Madrasa

== Economy ==
18 of Bangladesh's 163 tea gardens are in Fatikchhari Upazila. These are given below:-

- Aasia Tea Garden
- Andharmanik Tea Garden
- Baramasia Tea Garden
- Dantmara Tea Garden
- Elahi-Noor Tea Garden
- Haldavalley Tea Garden
- Laiyacherra Tea Garden
- Karnafuli Tea Garden
- Maa Jaan Tea Garden
- Mohammad Nagar Tea Garden
- Naseha Tea Garden
- Neptune Tea Garden
- New Dantmara Tea Garden
- Oodaleah Tea Garden
- Panchabati Tea Garden
- Ramgarh Tea Garden
- Rangapani Tea Garden
- MMH Tea Garden

Fatikchhari is also home to many rubber gardens. The Dantmara Rubber Garden (4500 acre) is the largest rubber garden in Asia. The other rubber gardens are Tarakon Rubber Garden, Rangamatia Rubber Garden and Kanchannagar Rubber Garden. It also home to the Bhujpur Rubber Dam.

== Administration ==
Bibir Hat is the administrative centre of the Fatikchhari Upazila, not Fatikchhari. Fatikchhari Upazila is divided into Fatikchhari Municipality, Nazirhat Municipality, and eighteen union councils. The union councils are further subdivided into 102 mauzas and 206 villages. The old Fatikchhari Thana is divided into two police stations (thanas) with Bhujpur Thana created as a new in 2008 with its seat near Kazir Hat.

Fatikchhari Municipality, Nazirhat Municipality, and 12 union councils under Fatikchhari Thana

- 6 No. Paindong
- 7 No. Kanchan Nagar
- 10 No. Sunderpur
- 13 No. Lelang
- 14 No. Nanupur
- 15 No. Roshangiri
- 16 No. Bokhtapur
- 17 No. Jafotnagar
- 18 No. Dharmapur
- 19 No. Samitirhat
- 20 No. Abdullapur
- 21 No. Khiram

6 union councils under Bhujpur Thana

- 1 No. Bagan Bazar
- 2 No. Dantmara
- 3 No. Narayanhat
- 4 No. Bhujpur
- 5 No. Harualchari
- 11 No. Suabil

Upazila Chairmen
Name	Term
ATM Peyarul Islam Kipaitnagari	
Aftab Uddin Chowdhury Haidchokia	2009-2014
Husayn Muhammad Abu Tayyab Jahanpuri	2014-2024
Nazim Uddin Muhuri	2024-2024

== Education ==
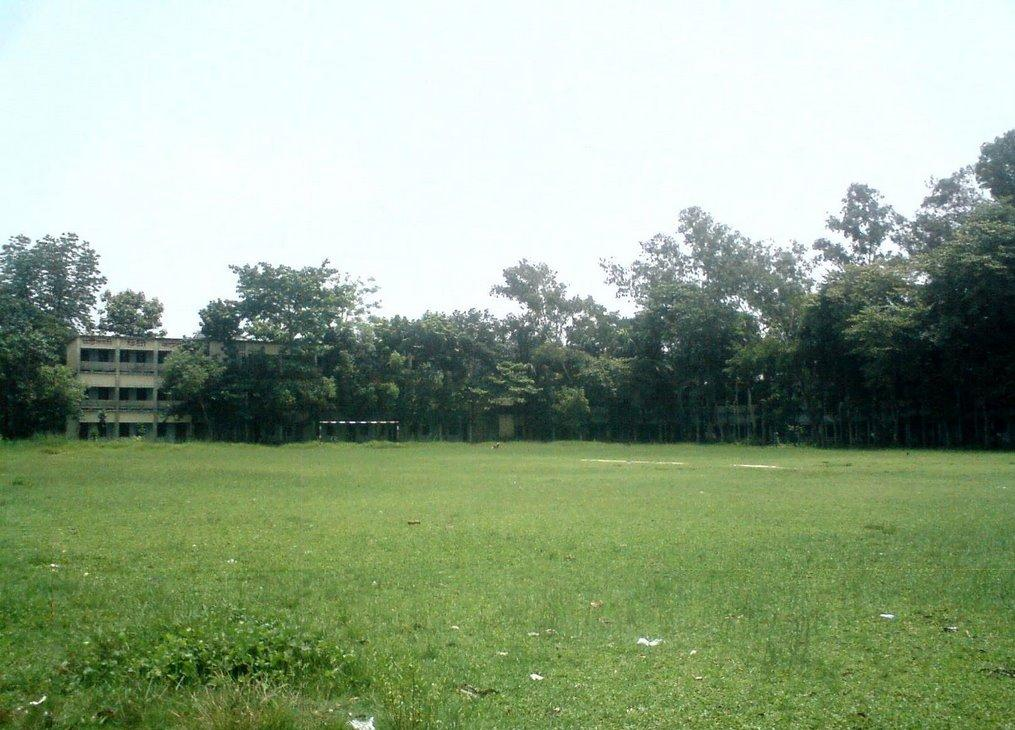
Fatikchhari Degree College

According to Banglapedia, Fatikchhari Coronation Model High School, founded in 1912; Maizbhander Ahmadia High School; Haidchakia High School, founded in 1926; Nanpur Abu Sobahan High School, founded in 1942; and Dhurung Khulshi Lion's High School, founded in 1943, are notable secondary school and Zamidar Abdul Bari Chowdhury (Abc) School There are five colleges in the upazila. They include Fatikchhari Degree College, founded in 1970. Another Primary School Founded in 1926, Anwar Ali Primary School and now it is a Registered Government Primary School. Its Haji Anwar Ali Sowdagor Bari Familiar Haji Anwar Ali Sowdagor Family Inferior. Other schools include Dantmara A.B.Z Sikder High School and Fatikchhari Girls Pilot High School.

The madrasa education system includes two fazil madrasas and one kamil madrasa. Al-Jamiah Al-Islamiah Obaidia Nanupur, Al-Jamiatul Islamiah Azizul Uloom Babunagar and Al Jamiatul Arabia Nasirul Islam are prominent Deobandi institutions in Fatikchhari.

== Notable people ==
- Syed Ahmad Ullah (1826-1906), founder of the Maizbhandari Sufi order
- Jamal Nazrul Islam (1939–2013), Bangladeshi mathematical physicist and cosmologist.
- Abdur Rahman (1920-2015), founding director of Islamic Research Center Bangladesh
- Gulamur Rahman (1865-1937), 2nd leader of the Maizbhandari Sufi order
- Harun Babunagari (1902-1986), founder of Al-Jamiatul Islamiah Azizul Uloom Babunagar
- Jamal Uddin Ahmad (1929-2016), accountant and former Deputy Prime Minister of Bangladesh
- Junaid Babunagari (1953-2021), Deobandi Islamic scholar and former Amir of Hefazat-e-Islam Bangladesh
- Muhammad Enamul Haq (1902-1982), Bangladeshi litterateur, researcher and educationist
- Muhibbullah Babunagari (b. 1935), chancellor of Al-Jamiatul Islamiah Azizul Uloom Babunagar
- Nurul Alam Chowdhury (1945-2019), diplomat and politician
- Nurul Islam Jihadi (b. 1948), Deobandi Islamic scholar and Amir of Hefazat-e-Islam Bangladesh
- Shah Sultan Ahmad Nanupuri (1914–1997), founding principal of Al-Jamiah Al-Islamiah Obaidia Nanupur
- Sufi Azizur Rahman (1862-1922), founder of Al-Jamiatul Ahlia Darul Ulum Moinul Islam
- Subrata Barua (b. 1946), Bengali writer
- Syed Najibul Bashar Maizbhandari (b. 1959), founder of the Bangladesh Tarikat Federation

== See also ==
- Fatikchhari
- Upazilas of Bangladesh
- Districts of Bangladesh
- Divisions of Bangladesh
- Thanas of Bangladesh
- Union councils of Bangladesh
