= Kazir Hat =

Coordinates: 22.752°N 91.737°E

Kazir Hat (Bengali: কাজিরহাট) is the administrative center and main market place of Bhujpur Thana of Fatikchhari Upazila, in the Chittagong District of the Chittagong Division, southeast Bangladesh.

It is located on the Chittagong–Ramgarh (R151) highway.
