= Baganbazar Union =

Union in Chittagong Division, Bangladesh

Baganbazar Union (Bengali: বাগানবাজার) is a Union of Fatikchhari North Upazila of Chittagong District.

== Geography ==
Area: 47,251 acres (191.22 km^{2})।

== Location ==
- North: Tripura (in India)
- East: Manikchhari Upazila
- South: Dantmara Union
- West: Sitakunda Mountain Range and Mirsharai Upazila

== Education ==
- Baganbazar High School
- Bagan Bazar Farukia Dakhil Madrasha
- Chikonchara High School
- Gazaria Zebunnesa Para High School
- Gazaria government primary school
- Andermanik government primary School
- Amtoli government primary school
- Koraliatakia government primary school
- Panua government primary school
- Noydolong government primary school
- Rasulpur government primary school
- Borobil government primary school
- Kachuakhonda government primary school
- Lalmai government primary school
- Jungle Dantmara govt. Primary school, South Gazaria

== Marketplaces and bazars ==
- Baganbazar
- Gaderbazar
- Chikonchara
- Andermanik
- Amtoli
- Koraliatakia
- Gazaria
- Panua
- Udoypathor
- Borobil
- Lalmai
