= Batnatali Union =

Union of Khagrachhari District, Chittagong, Bangladesh

Batnatali বাটনাতলী
- Union
- Interactive map of Batnatali
- Country: Bangladesh
- Division: Chittagong Division
- District: Khagrachhari District
- Upazila: Manikchhari Upazila

Area
  - Total: 64.75 km^{2} (25.00 sq mi)

Population (2022)
  - Total: 15,127
  - Density: 233.6/km^{2} (605.1/sq mi)
- Time zone: UTC+6 (BST)
- Postal code: 4460
- Website: batnataliup.khagrachhari.gov.bd

Batnatali Union is a union of Manikchhari Upazila under Khagrachhari District.

== Demography ==
According to 2022 census, total population of the Union are 15,127. Among them, 10,011 are Muslim, 3,746 are Buddhist and 1,370 are Hindu.

Religion-2022
1. Islam (66.2%)
2. Buddhism (24.8%)
3. Hinduism (9.06%)
4. Others (0.00%)

== Ethnicity ==
This Union is home to a variety of different ethnic groups. Among them, 10,282 are Bengali, 3,661 are Marma, 1,158 are Tripura, 26 are Chakma and 56 are of others ethnic groups.

Ethnicity-2022
1. Bengali (68.0%)
2. Marma (24.2%)
3. Tripura (7.66%)
4. Chakma (0.17%)
5. Others (0.00%)
