= Juggachhala Union =

Union of Khagrachhari District, Chittagong, Bangladesh

Juggachhala যোগ্যাছোলা
- Union
- Interactive map of Juggachhala
- Country: Bangladesh
- Division: Chittagong Division
- District: Khagrachhari District
- Upazila: Manikchhari Upazila

Population (2022)
  - Total: 13,452
- Time zone: UTC+6 (BST)
- Postal code: 4460
- Website: jogyacholaup.khagrachhari.gov.bd

Juggachhala/Jogyachola Union is a union of Manikchhari Upazila under Khagrachhari District.

== Demography ==
According to 2022 census, total population of the Union are 13,452. Among them, 9,093 are Muslim, 2,412 are Hindu, 1,709 are Buddhist, 207 are Christian and 31 are follower of others religion.

Religion-2022
1. Islam (67.6%)
2. Hinduism (17.9%)
3. Buddhism (12.7%)
4. Christianity (1.54%)
5. Others (0.23%)

== Ethnicity ==
This Union is home to a variety of different ethnic groups. Among them, 9,158 are Bengali, 2,580 are Tripura, 1,312 are Marma, 397 are Chakma and 5 are of others ethnic groups.

Ethnicity-2022
1. Bengali (68.1%)
2. Tripura (19.2%)
3. Marma (9.75%)
4. Chakma (2.95%)
5. Others (0.04%)
