= Tongibari Upazila =

Tongibari টঙ্গিবাড়ী
- Upazila
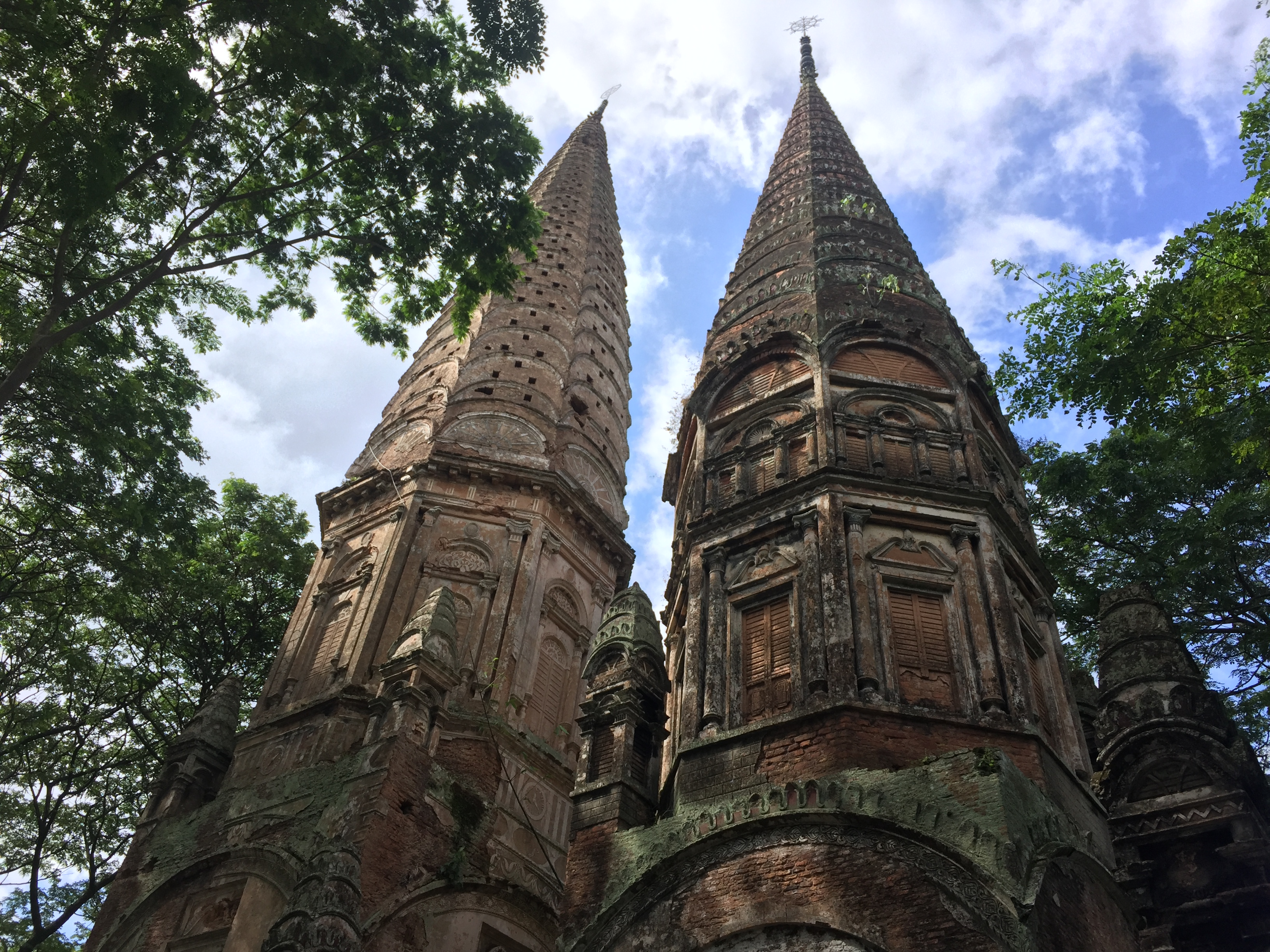
- Sonarong Jor Matha

- Coordinates: 23.5000°N 90.4583°E
- Country: Bangladesh
- Division: Dhaka
- District: Munshiganj

Area
  - Total: 140.91 km^{2} (54.41 sq mi)

Population (2022)
  - Total: 215,959
  - Density: 1,532.6/km^{2} (3,969.4/sq mi)
- Time zone: UTC+6 (BST)
- Postal code: 1520
- Area code: 0691
- Website: tongibari.munshiganj.gov.bd

Tongibari Upazila mauza geocode map

Tongibari (Bengali: টঙ্গিবাড়ী) is an upazila of Munshiganj District in Dhaka Division, Bangladesh.

== Geography ==
Tongibari is located at {{#|23°30′N 90°27.5′E|}}. It has 42,199 households and total area 140.91 km^{2}.

== Demographics ==
Religions in Tongibari Upazila (2022)
Religion	Percent
Islam	92.81%
Hinduism	7.18%
Other or not stated	0.01%

According to the 2022 Bangladeshi census, Tongibari Upazila had 52,890 households and a population of 215,959. 9.39% of the population were under 5 years of age. Tongibari had a literacy rate (age 7 and over) of 78.08%: 78.54% for males and 77.66% for females, and a sex ratio of 91.22 males for every 100 females. 10,968 (5.08%) lived in urban areas.

According to the 2011 Census of Bangladesh, Tongibari Upazila had 42,199 households and a population of 197,173, of which 41,986 (21.29%) were under 10 years of age. Tongibari had a literacy rate (age 7 and over) of 57.09%, compared to the national average of 51.8%, and a sex ratio of 1,010 females per 1,000 males. 17,706 (8.98%) inhabitants lived in urban areas.

As of the 1991 Bangladesh census, Tongibari has a population of 176,881. Males constitute 52.46% of the population, and females 47.54%. This upazila's eighteen up population is 83,593. Tongibari has an average literacy rate of 35.6% (7+ years), and the national average of 32.4% literate.

== Administration ==
Tongibari Upazila is divided into 12 union parishads: Abdullapur, Arial Baligaon, Autasahi, Betka, Dhipur, Dighirpar, Hasaila Banari, Joslong, Kamarkhara, Kathadia Shimolia, Panchgaon, and Sonarong Tongibari. The union parishads are subdivided into 113 mauzas and 151 villages.

== Education ==
=== Primary schools ===
Here is a list of all the primary schools in this Upazila.

- Tongibary Model Govt. Primary School
- Panchgaon Govt Primary School
- Uttor Kurmira Govt Primary School
- Serajabad Govt Primary School

=== Secondary schools ===
Here is a list of all the secondary schools in this Upazila.

- SVARNAGRAM R. N. HIGH SCHOOL
- PANCHGAON AL-HAZ WAHED ALI DEWAN HIGH SCHOOL
- BETKA UNION HIGH SCHOOL
- KALMA LAKSHMIKANTA HIGH SCHOOL AND COLLEGE
- TONGIBARI PILOT GIRLS' HIGH SCHOOL
- KHIDIRPARA HIGH SCHOOL
- BANARI HIGH SCHOOL
- PURA D. C. HIGH SCHOOL
- SONARANG GOVT. PILOT MODEL HIGH SCHOOL
- PAIKPARA UNION HIGH SCHOOL
- OUTSHAHEE RADHANATH HIGH SCHOOL
- DIGHIRPAR A. C. INSTITUTION
- BRAHMANBHITA UNION HIGH SCHOOL
- ABDULLAPUR HIGH SCHOOL
- BALIGAON HIGH SCHOOL
- BAZRAJOGINI J. K. HIGH SCHOOL
- RONGMAHER HIGH SCHOOL
- CHATHATIPARA SHEIKH KABEL ADARSHA HIGH SCHOOL
- HAZI ABDUL GONI ABDUL KARIM HIGH SCHOOL
- ARIAL SHORNOMAYEE HIGH SCHOOL

=== Colleges ===
- Bikrampur Tongibari College
- Serajabad Rana Shafiullah College

== See also ==
- Upazilas of Bangladesh
- Districts of Bangladesh
- Divisions of Bangladesh
