= Fatikchhari =

Fatikchhari ফটিকছড়ি
- Town and Municipality
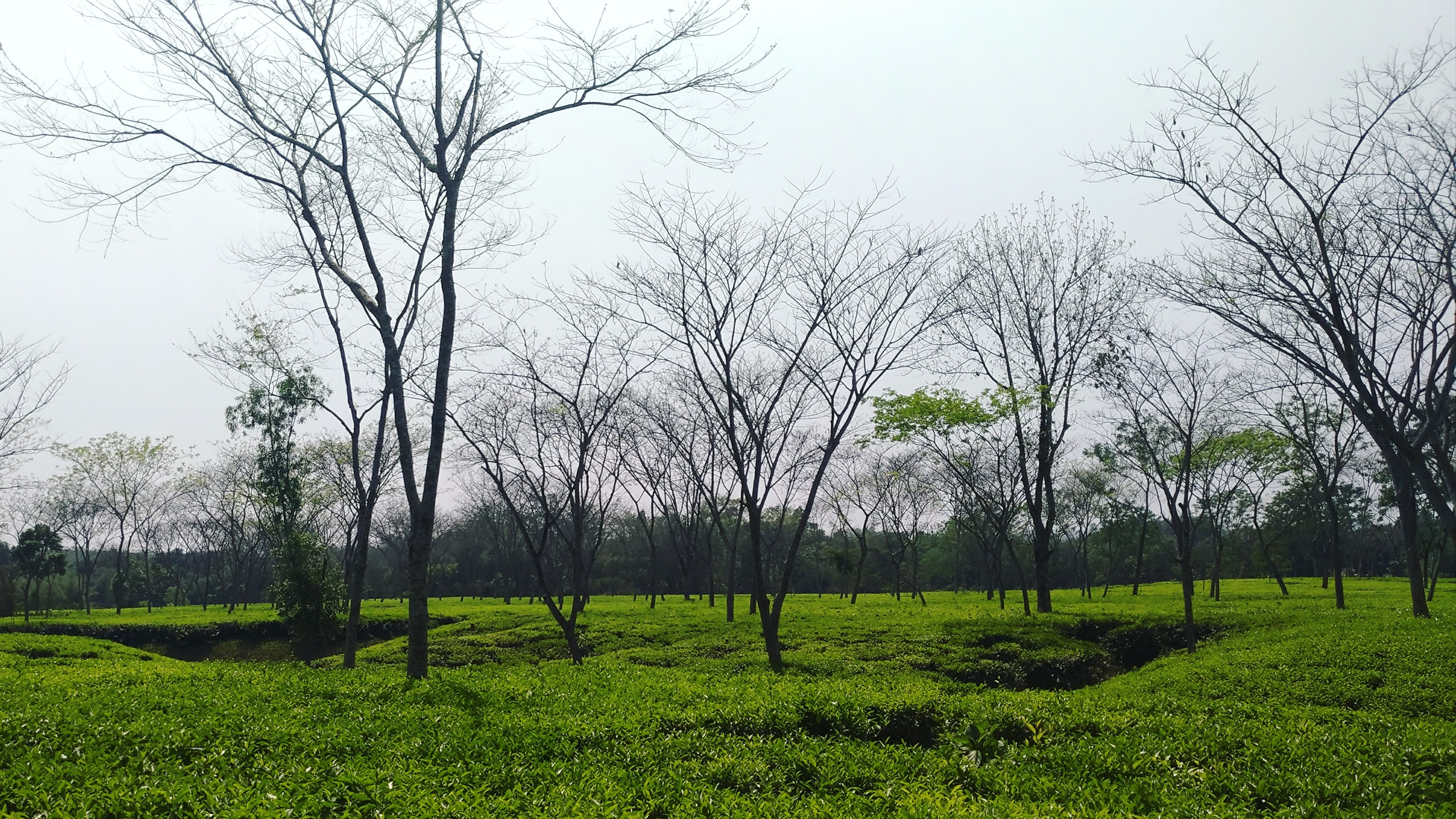
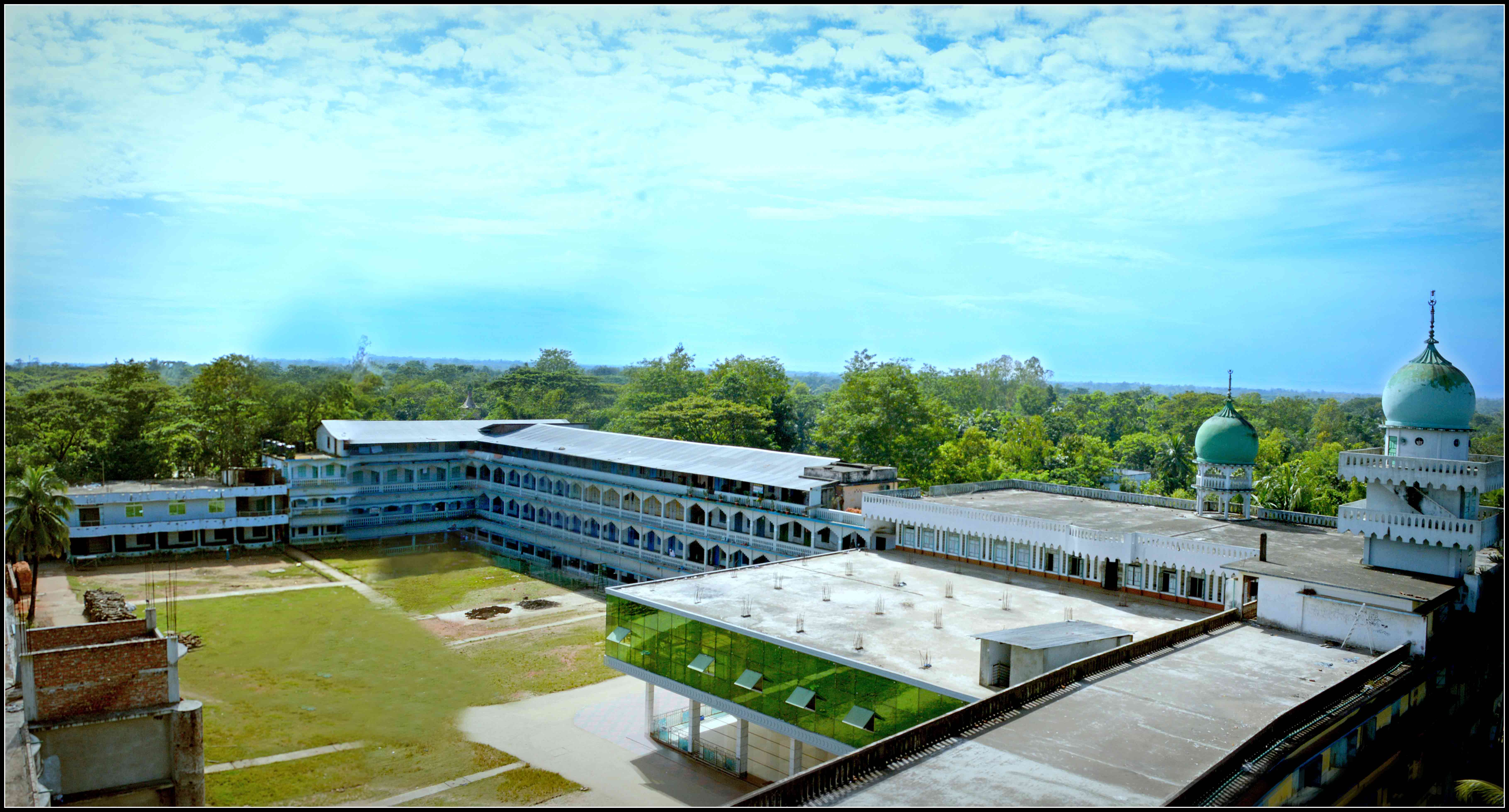
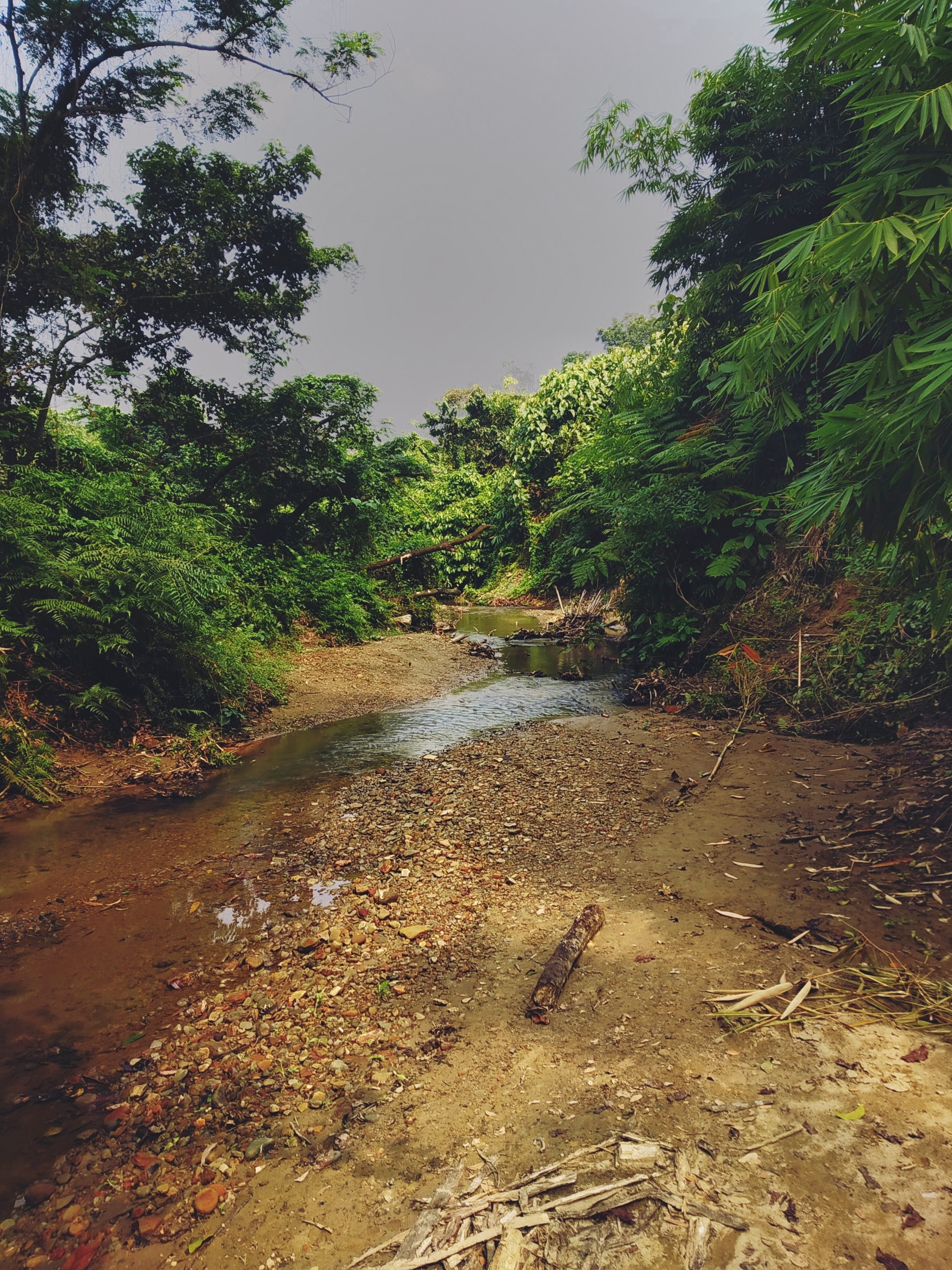
- From the top: Halda vally tea garden, Al Islamia Obaidia mosque, Hazarikhil wildlife sanctuary

- Location in Bangladesh
- Coordinates: 22°41′16″N 91°46′52″E
- Country: Bangladesh
- Division: Chittagong Division
- District: Chittagong District
- Upazila: Fatikchhari Upazila
- Municipality established: 31 March 2011

Government
  - Mayor: Mohammod Ismail Hossain

Area
  - Land: 37.15 km^{2} (14.34 sq mi)

Population (2001)
  - Total: 10,000
  - Density: 270/km^{2} (700/sq mi)
- Time zone: UTC+6 (BST)

Fatikchhari Municipality mahallah geocode map

Fatikchhari (Bengali: ফটিকছড়ি) is a town and municipality in Chittagong District in the division of Chittagong, Bangladesh. It is the administrative headquarters and urban centre of Fatikchhari Upazila.
