= Kawkhali Upazila, Rangamati =

Kawkhali কাউখালী
- Upazila
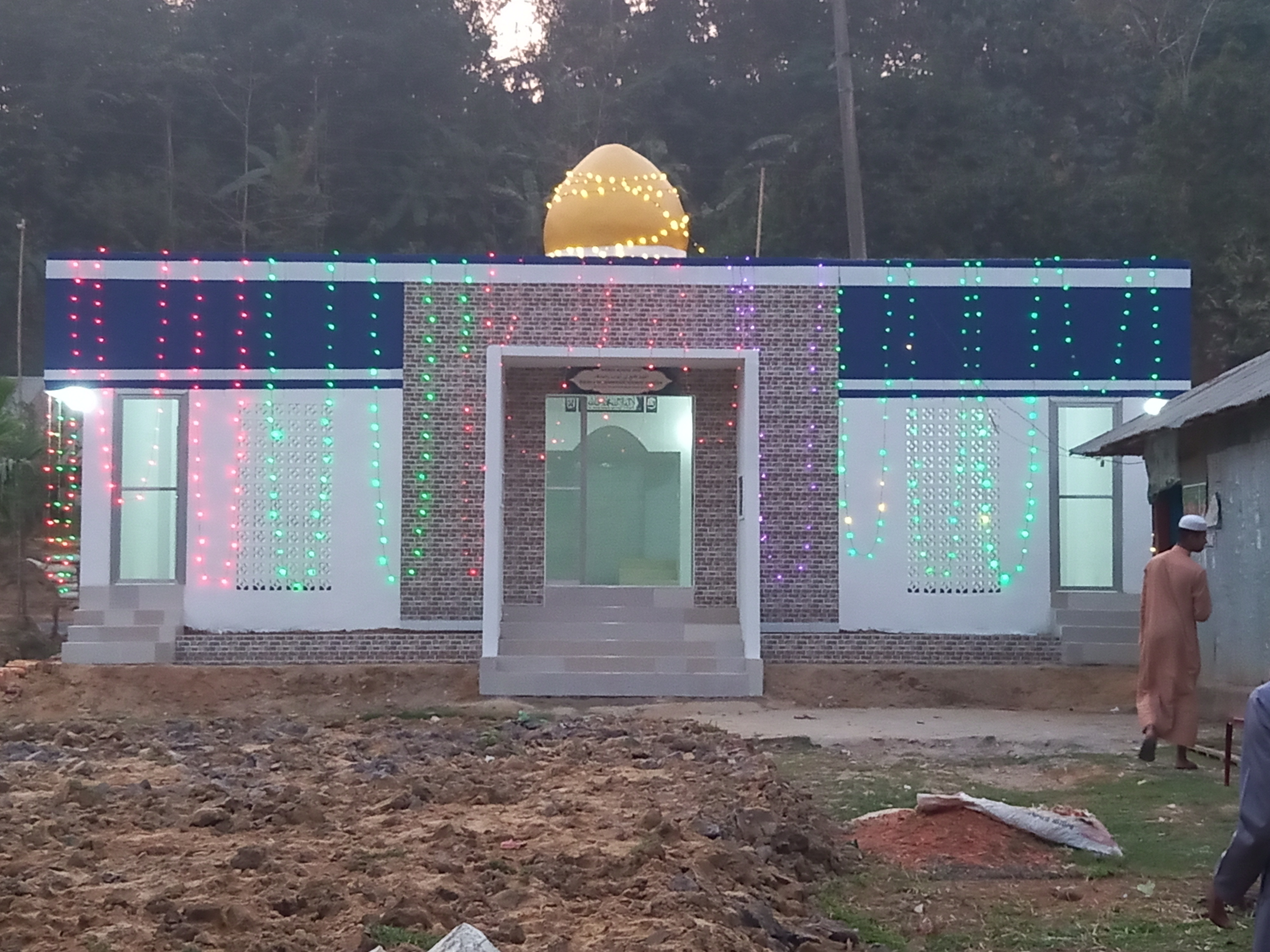
- Masjid Ba'alwie, built in 2024 in Kawkhali

- Coordinates: 22°32′N 92°1′E
- Country: Bangladesh
- Division: Chittagong
- District: Rangamati

Area
  - Total: 339.28 km^{2} (131.00 sq mi)

Population (2022)
  - Total: 66,313
  - Density: 195.45/km^{2} (506.22/sq mi)
- Time zone: UTC+6 (BST)
- Postal code: 4510
- Website: Official Map of the Kawkhali Upazila

Kawkhali (Bengali: কাউখালী) is an upazila of Rangamati District in the Division of Chittagong, Bangladesh.

== Demographics ==
According to the 2022 Bangladeshi census, Kawkhali Upazila had 15,383 households and a population of 66,313. 8.95% of the population were under 5 years of age. Kawkhali had a literacy rate (age 7 and over) of 71.18%: 77.51% for males and 64.79% for females, and a sex ratio of 101.14 males for every 100 females. 23,065 (34.78%) lived in urban areas.

=== Ethnicity and religion ===
Religions in Kawkhali Upazila (2022)
Religion	Percent
Buddhism	56.76%
Islam	40.05%
Hinduism	3.09%
Christianity	0.08%
Other or not stated	0.01%

Population by religion in Union
Union	Muslim	Buddhist	Others
Betbunia	10,939	7,619	961
Fatikchhari	2	5,793	36
Ghagra	7,708	16,655	704
Kalampati	7,908	7,574	401

🟩 Muslim majority 🟨 Buddhist majority

As of the 2022 Bangladesh census, Kawkhali upazila had a population of 66,313. The ethnic population was 36,550 (55.12%), of which Marma were 18,477, Chakma 17,188, and Tanchangya 677.

Ethnicity in the Kawkhali Upazila (2022)
1. Bengali (44.9%)
2. Marma (27.9%)
3. Chakma (25.9%)
4. Tanchangya (1.02%)
5. Others (0.32%)

Population by ethnicity in Union
Union	Bengali	Chakma	Marma	Others
Betbunia	12,503	601	6,372	43
Fatikchhari	11	3,278	2,497	45
Ghagra	8,851	12,177	3,290	749
Kalampati	8,394	1,132	6,318	48

🟩 Bengali majority 🟨 Chakma majority

== Administration ==
UNO: Happy Das.

Kawkhali Upazila is divided into four union parishads: Betbunia, Fatikchhari, Ghagra and Kalampati. The union parishads are subdivided into 11 mauzas and 149 villages.

== Notable people ==
- Ritu Porna Chakma, footballer

== See also ==
- Upazilas of Bangladesh
- Districts of Bangladesh
- Divisions of Bangladesh
