= Lelang Union =

Lelang Union (Bengali: লেলাং ইউনিয়ন) is a union parishad under Fatikchhari Upazila of Chittagong District in eastern Bangladesh.

== Geography ==
Lelang Union has a total area of 11,062 acres (44.77 km^{2}). It borders Kanchan Nagar Union to the north, Khiram Union to the east, Nanupur Union to the south, and Rangamatia Union to the west.

== Demographics ==
According to the 2011 Bangladesh census, Lelang Union had 4,962 households and a population of 25,078. Islam was the majority religion (83.7% of the population). Hindus were the second-largest religious community (16.1% of the population). 11.1% of the population was under the age of 5. The literacy rate (age 7 and over) was 51.4%, compared to the national average of 51.8%.

== Administration ==
There are six villages in the union: Damdama, Fenua, Gopalghata, Lelang, Shahnagar, and Roypur.

== Education ==
There is one higher secondary school, Shahnagar Bohumukhi High School and College. There is one secondary school, Gopalghata High School.

The madrasa education system includes one dakil madrasa, Bonde Raza A Mohila Dakil Madrasha.

== Notable residents ==
- Nurul Alam Chowdhury, member of parliament, was born in Gopalghata village.
