= Kanchan Nagar Union =

Coordinates: 22.7388°N 91.8435°E

- Interactive map of Kanchan Nagar Union

Area
  - Total: 59.13 km^{2} (22.83 sq mi)

Kanchan Nagar Union (Bengali: কাঞ্চন নগর) is a union parishad of Fatikchhari Upazila of Chittagong District, Bangladesh.

== Geography ==
Kanchan Nagar union is located.

== History ==
Many freedom fighters were martyred during liberation in the village. Kanchan Nagar Union was formed by the merger of Kanchanpur and Manikpur villages.

Currently there are three small villages in Kanchan Nagar Union Parishad. There are three traditions with the name of Kanchan Nagar Union, where most of the villages of North Kanchan Nagar village were dominated by the Buddhists. Hindu, Muslim and Buddhist people floated in this village.

== Culture ==
Kanchan Nath is a Hindu temple that sits in the middle village of Kanchan Nagar.

Rustum Fakir Jame Mosque is the central mosque. It's also known as Gayebi Mosjid.

The village has an ashram center.

The village has a tea garden, rubber garden, forest garden and forest office.

== Geography ==
Bordering the Union on the north is Manikchhari Upazila; on the east is Lakshmichhari Upazila; on the south is Rangamatia union; on the west is Paindong union.

== Population ==
As of 2011 Bangladesh census, Kanchan Nagar union had a population of 29,258.

Of these, 14,368 are male and 14,890 are female. The total family is 5,427.

=== Villages ===
- Middle Kanchan Nagar - 6,532
- South Kanchan Nagar - 8,167
- North Kanchan Nagar - 5,377
- Manik Pur - 6,672
- Araji Fenuaa - 570
- 17no Lot Roktochori - 3,252
- South Tila Para

== Administrative Area ==
The villages and wards are:

- Middle Kanchan Nagar, Ward No : 01
- Middle Kanchan Nagar, Ward No : 02
- North Kanchan Nagar, Ward No : 03
- West Kanchan Nagar, Ward No : 04
- South Kanchan Nagar, Ward No : 05
- South Kanchan Nagar, Ward No : 06
- Manikpur, Ward No : 07
- Manikpur, Ward No : 08
- Manikpur, Ward No : 09

== Educational Institute ==
One high school, 3 Dakhil Madrasahs and 7 primary schools operate in this village.

- Kanchan Nagar Bohu Mukhi High School
- Bainnachola-Manikpur High School
- Shahanshah Syed Ziaul Huq Maizbhandari High School
- Kanchan Nagar Rustumia Monirul Islam Dakhil Madrasah
- kanchan Nagar Hat Islamia Madrasah
- Keramotia Ahommodia Mohila Madrasah
- South Kanchan Nagar Khademul Islam Madrasah (Kawmi Madrasah)
- Sishu Kanon KG School
- Kanchan Nagar Rustumia Government Primary School
- Kanchan Nagar Government Primary School
- Manikpur Government Primary School
- Others

== Health Care ==
The Union has two health care centers:

1. Kanchan Nagar Health & Family Welfare Center.
2. Abdul Monayem Chowdhury General Hospital.
