= Manikchhari Union =

Union of Khagrachhari District, Chittagong, Bangladesh

Manikchhari মানিকছড়ি
- Union
- Interactive map of Manikchhari
- Country: Bangladesh
- Division: Chittagong Division
- District: Khagrachhari District
- Upazila: Manikchhari Upazila

Area
  - Total: 103.6 km^{2} (40.0 sq mi)

Population (2022)
  - Total: 18,877
  - Density: 182.2/km^{2} (471.9/sq mi)
- Time zone: UTC+6 (BST)
- Postal code: 4460
- Website: manikchariup.khagrachhari.gov.bd

Manikchhari Union is a union of Manikchhari Upazila under Khagrachhari District.

== Demography ==
According to 2022 census, total population of the Union are 28,856. Among them, 18,877 are Muslim, 7,408 are Buddhist, 2,557 are Hindu, 10 are Christian and 4 are follower of others religion.

Religion-2022
1. Islam (65.4%)
2. Buddhism (25.7%)
3. Hinduism (8.86%)
4. Christianity (0.03%)
5. Others (0.01%)

== Ethnicity ==
This Union is home to a variety of different ethnic groups. Among them, 21,654 are Bengali, 6,276 are Marma, 747 are Chakma, 116 are Tripura and 63 are of others ethnic groups.

Ethnicity-2022
1. Bengali (75.0%)
2. Marma (21.8%)
3. Chakma (2.59%)
4. Tripura (0.40%)
5. Others (0.22%)
