= Khilpara =

Village in Bangladesh

Coordinates: 23°31′56″N 90°27′35″E

Khilpara (Bengali: খিলপাড়া) is a village in Munshiganj District in central Bangladesh. It is part of Dhaka Division and borders Dhaka District.

== Mosques ==
- Khilpara Chad Tara Jame Masjid (Bengali: খিলপাড়া চাঁদ তারা জামে মসজিদ)
- Khilpara Baitul Aman Jame Masjid (Bengali: খিলপাড়া বাইতুল আমান জামে মসজিদ)
- Khilpara Capra Masjid (Bengali: খিলপাড়া ছাপড়া মসজিদ)

== Population ==
The population is 3,172.

== Roads ==
=== Main roads ===
- Tongibari - Sonarang - Betka Road
- Natun Bazar - Betka Chowrastha Road

=== Branch roads ===
- Natun Bazar - Paschim Khilpara Road
- Khilpara - Paschim Khilpara Road
- Purba Khilpara Road
- Khilpara - Paikpara Road

== Bridges ==
- Main Khilpara Bridge
- Pascim Khilpara Bridge
- Ghusal Bari Bridge
- Jaan Paar Kather setu

== Education ==
=== Government primary schools ===
- Khilpara Government primary school
