= Fatikchhari Union =

Union of Rangamati District, Chittagong, Bangladesh

Fatikchhari ফটিকছড়ি
- Union
- Interactive map of Fatikchhari
- Country: Bangladesh
- Division: Chittagong Division
- District: Rangamati District
- Upazila: Kawkhali Upazila

Area
  - Total: 77.7 km^{2} (30.0 sq mi)

Population (2022)
  - Total: 5,831
  - Density: 75.0/km^{2} (194/sq mi)
- Time zone: UTC+6 (BST)
- Postal code: 4510
- Website: fatikchariup.rangamati.gov.bd

Fatikchhari Union is a union of Kawkhali Upazila, Rangamati under Rangamati District.

== Demography ==
According to 2022 census, total population of the Union are 15,892. Among them, 2 are Muslim, 5,793 are Buddhist, 27 are Hindu, 2 are Christian and 2 follow others religion.

Religion-2022
1. Buddhism (99.3%)
2. Hinduism (0.46%)
3. Christianity (0.12%)
4. Islam (0.03%)
5. Others (0.03%)

== Ethnicity ==
This Union is home to a variety of different ethnic groups. Among them, 11 are Bengali, 3,278 are Chakma, 2,497 are Marma and 45 are of others ethnic groups.

Ethnicity-2022
1. Chakma (56.2%)
2. Marma (42.8%)
3. Bengali (0.19%)
4. Others (0.77%)
