= Ghagra Union, Kawkhali =

Union of Rangamati District, Chittagong, Bangladesh

Ghagra ঘাগড়া
- Union
- Interactive map of Ghagra
- Country: Bangladesh
- Division: Chittagong Division
- District: Rangamati District
- Upazila: Kawkhali Upazila

Area
  - Total: 121.73 km^{2} (47.00 sq mi)

Population (2022)
  - Total: 25,067
  - Density: 205.92/km^{2} (533.34/sq mi)
- Time zone: UTC+6 (BST)
- Postal code: 4510
- Website: betbuniaup.rangamati.gov.bd

Ghagra Union is a union of Kawkhali Upazila, Rangamati under Rangamati District.

== Demography ==
According to 2022 census, total population of the Union are 25,067. Among them, 7,708 are Muslim, 16,655 are Buddhist, 688 are Hindu and 16 are Christian.

Religion-2022
1. Buddhism (66.4%)
2. Islam (30.8%)
3. Hinduism (2.75%)
4. Christianity (0.02%)
5. Others (0.00%)

== Ethnicity ==
This Union is home to a variety of different ethnic groups. Among them, 8,851 are Bengali, 12,177 are Chakma, 3,290 are Marma, 655 are Tanchangya and 94 are of others ethnic groups.

Ethnicity-2022
1. Chakma (48.6%)
2. Bengali (35.3%)
3. Marma (13.1%)
4. Tanchangya (2.61%)
5. Others (0.37%)
