= Abdullapur Union =

Coordinates: 22.573°N 91.871°E

Abdullapur Union (Bengali: আব্দুল্লাপুর) is a union of Tongibari Upazila of Munshiganj District, Bangladesh. Abdullapur Union is 529 acres (214 ha) in size.

== Location ==
- North: Mirkadim Pourasava
- East: Rampal
- South: Sonarong
- West: Betka

== Population ==
At the 1991 Bangladesh census, Abdullapur Union had a population of 4461.
