= Bhujpur Union =

Bhujpur Union ভূজপুর
- Upazila
- Location in Bangladesh
- Coordinates: 22°44.9′N 91°44.3′E
- Country: Bangladesh
- Division: Chittagong Division
- District: Chittagong District

Area
  - Total: 53.87 km^{2} (20.80 sq mi)

Population (1991)
  - Total: 27,932
- Time zone: UTC+6 (BST)

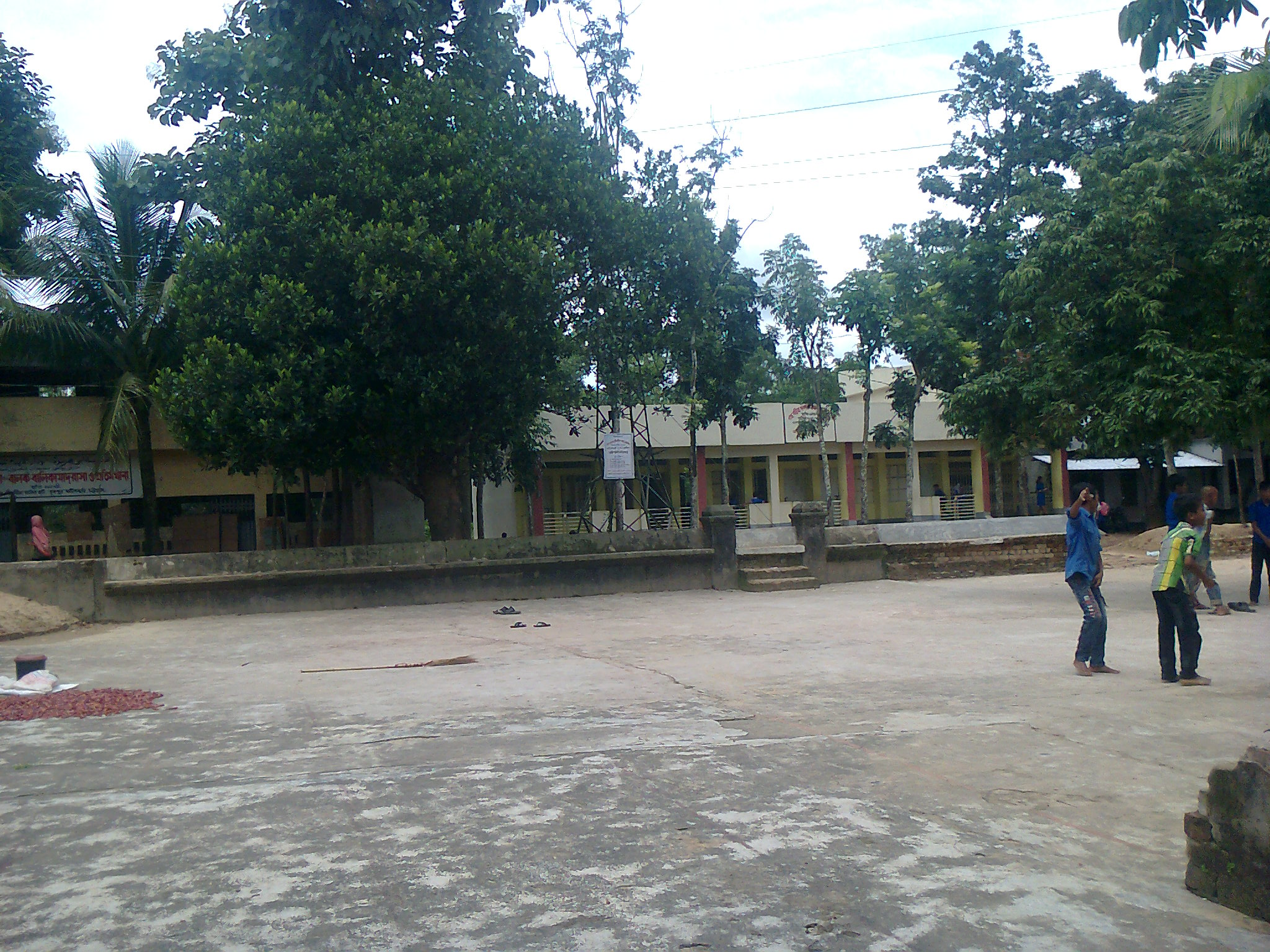
The Mirerkhil Eidgah, adjacent to Gasbaria Government Primary School and Mirerkhil Abu Hurairah Madrasa.

Bhujpur Union (Bengali: ভূজপূর) is a union of Fatikchhari Upazila, Chittagong District, Bangladesh.

== History ==
There was a King Bhoj in the area in ancient time according to puthi (poem) written by Abdul Majid Pundit. Bhujpur is named after that King Bhoj. But there is no concrete evidence about this story.

== Geography ==
Bhujpur Union has a total area of 13,311 acres (5,387 ha). It borders Narayanhat Union to the north, Manikchhari Upazila and Paindanga Union to the east, Harualchari Union to the south, and the Sitakunda Mountain Range to the west.

== Demographics ==
As of 1991 Bangladesh census, Bhujpur union has a population of 27,932. Males constitute 14,387 of the population, and females 13,545.

== Economy ==
Kazir Hat Heyako and Fakir Hat is main marketplaces in the union.

== Administration ==
Bhujpur Union is divided into 12 mauzas: Amtali, Azimpur, Banikpara, Harina, Jungle Kaiyapukhia, Kotbaria, Paglichhari, Paschim Bhujpur, Paschim Kaiyapukhia, Purba Bhujpur, Purba Kaiuapukhia, Ramgarh Sitakunda R.F., and Singharia.

== Education ==
Bhujpur Union has 3 high schools, 8 primary schools, and 6 madrassahs.

- Bhujpur National School & College
- East Bhujpur Government Primary School
- Bhujpur Model High School
- Mirzar Hat High School
- East Bhujpur Primary School
- Gasbaria Primary School
- Shariatul Uloom Primary School
- West Bhujpur A. Gani Primary School
- Amtali Primary school
- Kazir Hat Emdadul Islam Madrassa
- Shariatul Uloom Madrassa
