= Suabil Union =

Union in Chittagong Division, Bangladesh

Suabil Union (Bengali: সুয়াবিল) is a union of Fatikchhari North Upazila of Chittagong District.

== Geography ==
Area of Suabil: 17,810 acres (72.1 km^{2})

=== Location ===
- North: Harualchari Union
- East: Fatikchhari Upazila
- South: Hathazari Upazila
- West: Sitakunda Mountain Range

== Demographics ==
At the 1991 Bangladesh census, Suabil union had a population of 24,585.

== Education ==
Suabil Union has two high schools.
