= Harualchari Union =

Union in Chittagong Division, Bangladesh

Coordinates: 22.717°N 91.747°E

Harualchhari (Bengali: হারুয়ালছড়ি) is a union of Fatikchhari North Upazila of Chittagong District.

== Geography ==
Area of Harualchhari : 14,772 acres (5,978 ha).

== Location ==
- North: Bhujpur Union
- East: Fatikchhari Upazila
- South: Suabil Union
- West: Sitakunda Mountain Range

== Population ==
As of the 2011 Bangladesh census, Harualchari Union has a population of 40000.

Iqbal Hossain Chowdhury is the current chairman of the union elected consecutively second time in the UP election 2016.

== Villages and mouzas ==
Harualchhari, Lomba Beel, Mohansapara, Koratipara, Borbill, Hazarkill, Porbo Fatickchari

== Education ==
- Uttar Harualchhari Government Primary School
- Hrualchhari High School
- Gawsia Rahmania Sunnia Madrasa
- Middle Harualchhari Govt. Primary School
- Middle Fatickchhari (Mohansah Para) Govt. Primary School
- Porbo Fatickchari Govt. Primary School
