= Baktapur Union =

Coordinates: 22.6215°N 91.8669°E

Bakhtapur union (Bengali: বক্তপূর) is a Union of Fatikchhari Upazila of Chittagong District, Bangladesh. The area of Baktapur is 1,136 acres (460 ha).

== Population ==
At the 1991 Bangladesh census, Baktapur Union had a population of 13,915 and house units 1861.

== Education ==
- Dr Enamul Hoque High School
- Mahater Dighi Primary
- Dairabari Primary & High School
- Goldar Bari School
- Jharnar Dighi School & Maddarasha
- Bakhtapur Adarsha Kindergarten
- Sulthania Asraful Uloom KG Madrasha.
