= Nanupur Union =

Nanupur Union (Bengali: নানুপুর) is a union of Fatikchhari Upazila of Chittagong District.

== History ==
Poet Shabrid Kha (Bangla-সাবরিদ খাঁ) had given the name Nanupur to respect his grandfather Nanuraza Khan Mollik.

== Geography ==
Area of Nanupur: 2,031 acres (8.69 km^{2}).

== Location ==
- North: Lakshmichhari Upazila
- East: Raozan Upazila
- South: Dharmapur Union
- West: Lelang Union

== Population ==
As of 1991 Bangladesh census, Nanupur union has a population of 5,846 and house units 449.

== Economy ==
Nanupur Bazar is the main market place in the Nanupur Union. Its situated in central of Nanupur Village. Its previous name Kali Munshir Hat. Khiram is known as commercial village in union.

== Education ==
- Nanupur Aboo Sobhan High School
- Nanupur Laila kabir degree college
- Khiram Azizia Sultanul Ulum Madrasha
- Nanupur Girls high school
- Khiram High School
- Nanupur Aboo Sobhan Govt. primary school
- Nanupur gausia senior fazil madrasha
- Nanupur obaidia madrasha
- Nanupur mohila alim madrasha
- Dhalkata primary school
- Nanupur Gawsia Primary School
- Mannania Primary School
- Gamritala Primary School
- Kipait Nagor Primary School
