= Bhujpur Thana =

Bhujpur ভূজপূর
- Thana
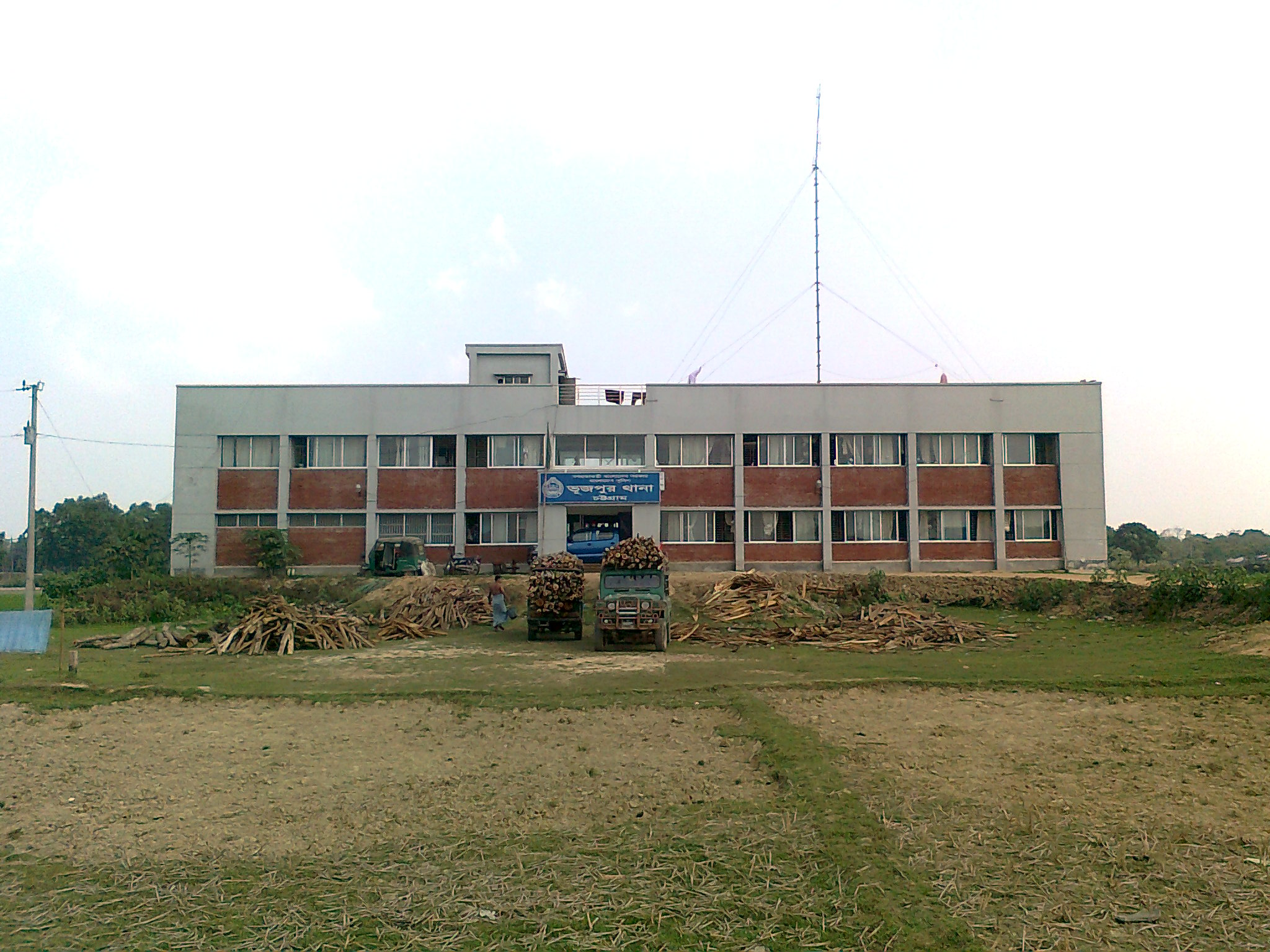

- Location in Bangladesh
- Coordinates: 22°41′N 91°48.3′E
- Country: Bangladesh
- Division: Chittagong Division
- District: Chittagong District

Area
  - Total: 486.9 km^{2} (188.0 sq mi)
- Time zone: UTC+6 (BST)

Bhujpur Thana (Bengali: ভূজপূর থানা) is a thana in the Fatikchari upazila, Chittagong District of Bangladesh.
