= Manikchhari Upazila =

Manikchhari মানিকছড়ি
- Upazila
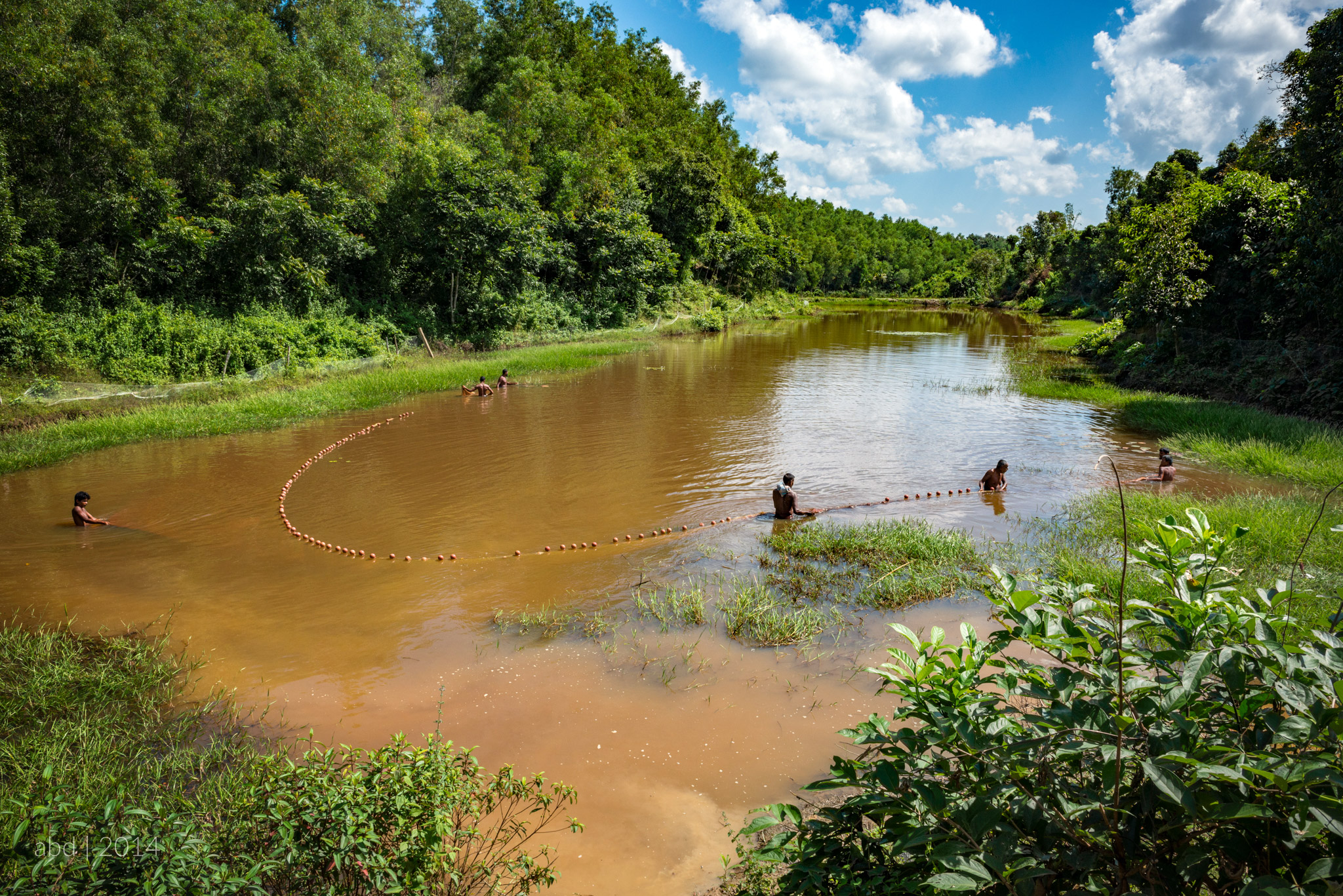
- A lake in Manikchari

- Coordinates: 22°50.1′N 91°50.2′E
- Country: Bangladesh
- Division: Chittagong
- District: Khagrachhari

Area
  - Total: 168.34 km^{2} (65.00 sq mi)

Population (2022)
  - Total: 77,027
  - Density: 457.57/km^{2} (1,185.1/sq mi)
- Demonym(s): Manikchhoria, Khagrachhoria, Chatgaiya
- Time zone: UTC+6 (BST)
- Postal code: 4460
- Website: manikchari.khagrachhari.gov.bd

Manikchhari Upazila mauza geocode map

Manikchari (Bengali: মানিকছড়ি) is an upazila of Khagrachari District in the Division of Chittagong, Bangladesh.

== Geography ==
Manikchari is located at 22.8347°N 91.8361°E. It has a total area of 168.34 km^{2}.

== Demographics ==
According to the 2022 Bangladeshi census, Manikchhari Upazila had 17,695 households and a population of 77,027. 12.09% of the population were under 5 years of age. Manikchhari had a literacy rate (age 7 and over) of 72.44%: 76.41% for males and 68.70% for females, and a sex ratio of 95.64 males for every 100 females. 54,123 (70.26%) lived in urban areas.

=== Ethnicity and religion ===
Religions in Manikchhari Upazila (2022)
Religion	Percent
Islam	68.01%
Buddhism	21.50%
Hinduism	10.15%
Christianity	0.29%
Other or not stated	0.05%

Population by religion in Union
Union	Muslim	Buddhist	Hindu	Others
Batnatali	10,011	3,746	1,370	0
Juggachhala	9,093	1,709	2,412	238
Manikchhari	18,877	7,408	2,557	14
Tintahari	14,404	3,694	1,478	14

🟩 Muslim majority

As of the 2022 Bangladeshi census, Manikchhari upazila had a population of 77,027. The ethnic population was 20,357 (26.43%), of which Marma were 14,431, Tripura 4,313 and Chakma 1,489.

Ethnicity in Manikchhari (2022)
1. Bengali (73.6%)
2. Marma (18.7%)
3. Tripura (5.60%)
4. Chakma (1.93%)
5. Others (0.17%)

Population by ethnicity in Union
Union	Bengali	Marma	Tripura	Chakma	Others
Batnatali	10,282	3,661	1,158	26	0
Juggachhala	9,158	1,312	2,580	397	5
Manikchhari	21,657	6,276	116	747	63
Tintahari	15,573	3,182	459	319	56

🟩 Bengali majority

== Administration ==
UNO: Saiyeda Sadia Nuria.

Manikchhari Upazila is divided into four union parishads: Batnatali, Juggachhala, Manikchhari and Tintahari. The union parishads are subdivided into 12 mauzas and 160 villages.

== See also ==
- Upazilas of Bangladesh
- Districts of Bangladesh
- Divisions of Bangladesh
