= Dighinala =

Dighinala is an administrative subdivision in Bangladesh. It may refer to:

- Dighinala Upazila, a upazila in Khagrachhari District
  - Dighinala Union, a union in Khagrachhari District
- Dighinala Cantonment, a Cantonment of Bangladesh Army
