= Rani Yan Yan =

Yan Yan
- Rani of Chakma Circle
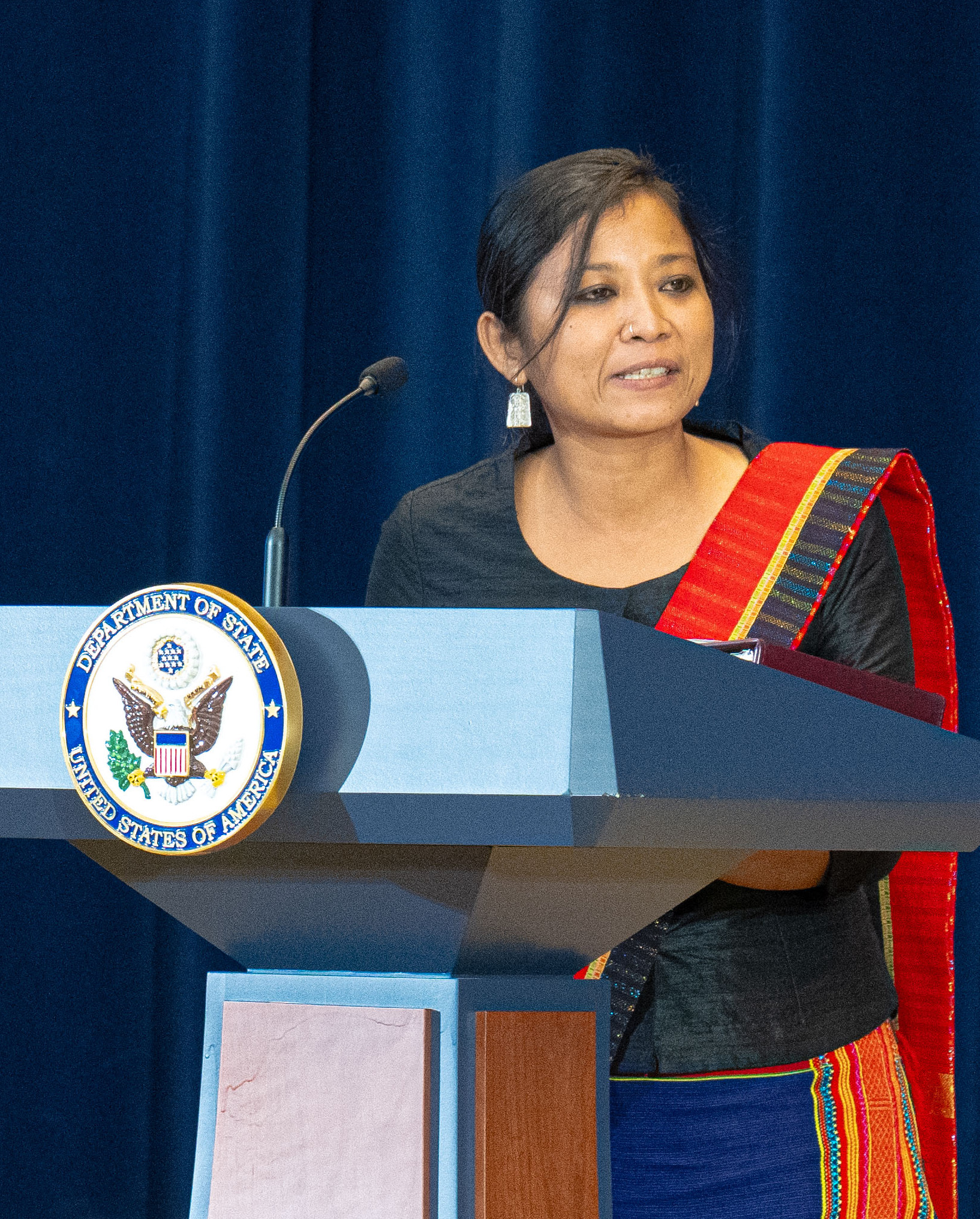
- Rani Yan Yan Delivers Remarks at the First Annual Ceremony for the Secretary of State’s Award for Global Anti-Racism Champions

Consort to Chief of the Chakma Circle
- Tenure: 2014 – present
- Predecessor: Arati Roy
- Born: 1984 (age 41–42); Bandarban District, Bangladesh
- Spouse: Devasish Roy (m. 2014)
- Father: U Maung Rhee
- Mother: Daw Pu Mya Khine
- Occupation: Indigenous Human Rights defendee Woman rights activist

Rani Yan Yan (Note: Bengali: রাণী ইয়েন ইয়েন; Chakma: 𑄢𑄚𑄨 𑄠𑄚𑄴 𑄠𑄚𑄴; Rakhine: မိဖုရား ယိုင်ယိုင်) (born 1984) is an Indigenous human rights defender and women's rights activist from Bangladesh, serving as the advisor to the Chakma Circle Chief. In 2014, she married Devasish Roy, the Chakma Circle Chief, and has since been known as Rani Yan Yan.

== Career ==
As the Chakma Rani (queen) and advisor to the Chakma Circle Chief, she has effectively advocated for the appointment of more women as headmen and karbaris (traditional leaders), ensuring women's rights are upheld within the traditional system.

She has advised organizations on climate resiliency and gender equality, researched political participation of Indigenous women, and mentored youth activists on diversity and social inclusion.

In 2018, while supporting two Indigenous teenage girls who had been sexually assaulted, Rani Yan Yan was attacked.

During the COVID-19 pandemic, she promoted simple, low-cost water supply systems to encourage handwashing in remote Indigenous communities, addressing health and food security challenges.

In recognition of her efforts, Rani Yan Yan was honored with the Global Anti-Racism Champions Award by the U.S. Department of State in 2023.

On 6 April 2026, the Rangamati District Magistrate, on the directive of the Ministry of Home Affairs, issued a formal caution to Yan Yan, accusing her of spreading "false and misleading information" against the Bangladeshi government and military. Yan Yan's lawyers denied the accusations and requested the caution be withdrawn. The human rights organisation Front Line Defenders described the caution as being "directly connected" to Yan Yan's human rights activism.

== Personal life ==
In her personal life, Rani Yan Yan practices Buddhism and was once ordained as a female monastic. In 2014, Rani Yan Yan returned to Bangladesh after obtaining a bachelor's degree in development studies from the University of Adelaide in Australia. Additionally, she is an alumna of the Diplomacy Training Program at the University of New South Wales and a graduate of the Asia-Pacific Forum on Feminist Legal Theory and Practice. She is of ethnic Rakhine, born to U Maung Rhee and Daw Pu Mya Khine.

== See also ==
- Chakma Circle
- Tridiv Roy
- Benita Roy
