= Boalkhali (disambiguation) =

Boalkhali is a town in Bangladesh. It may also refer to:

- Boalkhali Upazila, an Upazila under Chittagong District in Bangladesh
  - Boalkhali Municipality, a municipal corporation in Boalkhali Upazila
- Boalkhali Union, a union under Khagrachhari District in Bangladesh
