= Mong Circle =

Tribal chieftaincy in Bangladesh

The Mong Circle (Burmese: ဖလံထောင်, Bengali: মং সার্কেল) is one of three hereditary chiefdoms (or "circles") in the Chittagong Hill Tracts of modern-day Bangladesh. The jurisdiction of the Mong Circle encompasses parts of Khagrachhari District except 21 mouzas of Dighinala Upazila and 12 Mouzas of Lakshmichhari Upazila. The chiefdom's members are of Marma descent and are known as phalansa. Most inhabitants of the Mong Circle settled in the northwest during a migration wave from the Kingdom of Mrauk U (modern-day Rakhine State in Myanmar) between the 16th and 18th centuries, while inhabitants of the other Marma chiefdom, the Bohmong Circle settled in the south and are known as ragraisa.

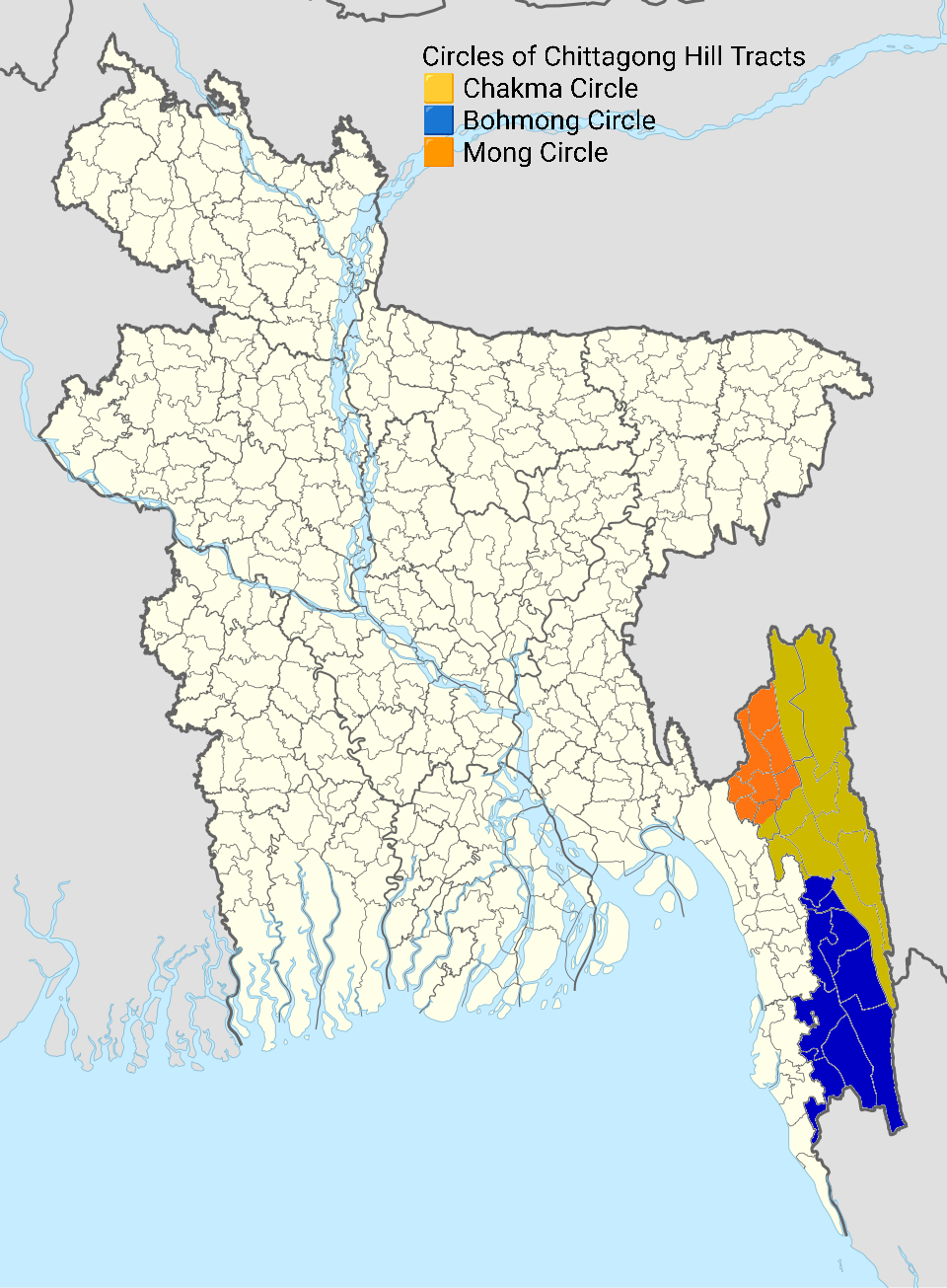
Circles of Chittagong Hill Tracts

== Leadership ==
The Mong Circle is led by a hereditary chieftain called a "raja." The Mong chieftains appoint and oversee headmen called mouza and village chiefs called karbaris. The incumbent chieftain is Saching Prue (b. 1988) of the Chowdhury house; he formally ascended the throne on 17 January 2009. His predecessor, Paihala Prue Chowdhury, died in a roadside car accident on 22 October 2008.

== History ==
The Mong Circle dates to 1782 with the first chieftain, Mrachai. During British rule, the British authorities designated the Mong Circle in 1871, to encompass an ethnically mixed population in the Feni valley. In 1881, the Chittagong Hill Tracts were administratively divided into three circles, namely the Chakma Circle, the Bohmong Circle, and the Mong Circles, each presided over by a hereditary chief from the Chakma and Marma peoples. The circles were codified into law with the Chittagong Hill Tract Regulations, 1900, eased revenue collection and administrative burdens on British authorities by delegating tax collection, land administration management and social arbitration responsibilities to the chieftains. In 1901, the Mong Circle extended 653 square miles (1,690 km^{2}). This administrative structure remained in place until 1964, when the introduction of local self-government abolished the special status of these circles and brought local administration under the control of the central government.

During the 1971 Liberation War, the Marma chief actively supported Bangladeshi independence.

== See also ==
- Marma people
- Bohmong Circle
- Chakma Circle
