= Benita Roy =

- Rani of Chakma Circle
- Born: Benita Sen; 18 August 1907; Surrey, England
- Spouse: Nalinaksha Roy (m. 1928; died 1951)
- Issue: Tridev Roy
- Father: Saral Chandra Sen
- Religion: Buddhism

Rajmata Benita Roy (born 18 August 1907, date of death unknown) was a Bangladeshi aristocrat, litterateur, diplomat and minister. She was the forty-ninth Rani of the Chakma Circle in the Chittagong Hill Tracts. Roy served as the Rajmata during the kingship of Tridev Roy and Debashish Roy. She was a member of Bangladesh's first delegation to the UN General Assembly in 1972, and a minister in the Bangladeshi government from 1975 to 1978.

== Family and the arts ==
Benita Sen was born on 18 August 1907 in Surrey, England to law student Saral Chandra Sen. Her paternal grandfather, Keshub Chandra Sen, was a Bengali Hindu reformer and Brahmo Samaj leader. Her mother's sister, Naina Devi, was a singer of Hindustani classical music. Benita attended Bethune College in Calcutta until age 18, when she married Raja Nalinaksha Roy and became the forty-ninth Rani of the Chakma Circle. She was widowed in 1951.

Benita was a close associate of Rabindranath Tagore, under whose patronage she launched the first literary magazine in the Chittagong Hill Tracts. Named Garika, it was the first publication of its kind to feature Chakma language poetry.

== Liberation War and government ==
During the Bangladesh Liberation War in 1971, Roy opened up the Rangamati Palace as a shelter for civilians.

In 1972, Sheikh Mujibur Rahman appointed her as a member of Bangladesh's first delegation to the UN General Assembly. The Pakistani government at the time sent a counter delegation led by her son Tridev Roy, who sided with the Pakistani establishment in the liberation war.

During the political and constitutional crises of the mid-1970s, Roy served in the Bangladeshi government as Minister of Land Administration and Land Reforms (December 1975 - January 1976) and Minister of Relief and Rehabilitation (February 1976 - June 1978).
