= Lakshmichhari =

Lakshmichhari may refer to:

- Lakshmichhari Upazila, an upazila of Khagrachhari District
- Lakshmichhari Union, a union of Lakshmichhari Upazila under Khagrachhari District
