= Yan Yan =

Yan Yan may refer to:

- Yan Yan (disciple of Confucius) (言偃)
- Yan Yan (Three Kingdoms) (嚴顏)
- Yan Yan (snack)
- Hung Yan-yan
- Rani Yan Yan
- Yan Yan Chan
- Yan Yan Mak

== See also ==
- Yanyan, or HD 38283 b, an extrasolar planet
