= Dighinala Cantonment =

Bangladeshi military cantonment

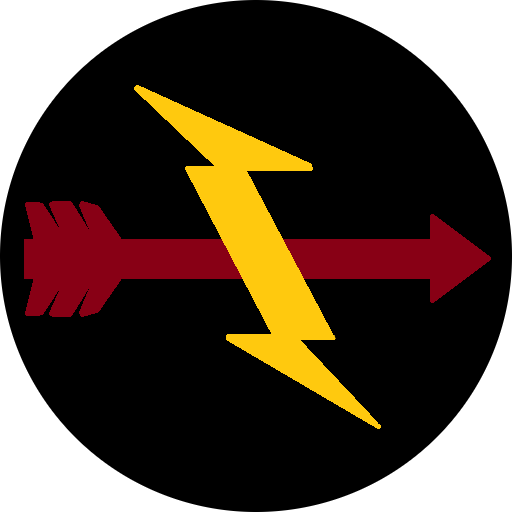
Dighinala Cantonment
- Dighinala, Khagrachari

Site information
- Type: Cantonment
- Controlled by: Bangladesh Army

Location
- Coordinates: 23.2408°N 92.0641°E

Dighinala Cantonment (Bengali: দীঘিনালা সেনানিবাস) is a cantonment in Dighinala, outside of Khagrachari. 24th Infantry Division of Bangladesh Army inhabit here.

It is one of numerous cantonments in Chittagong Hill Tracts area.

== See also ==
- Alikadam Cantonment
- Bandarban Cantonment
