= The Last Raja of West Pakistan =

Biography of last Pakistan emperor

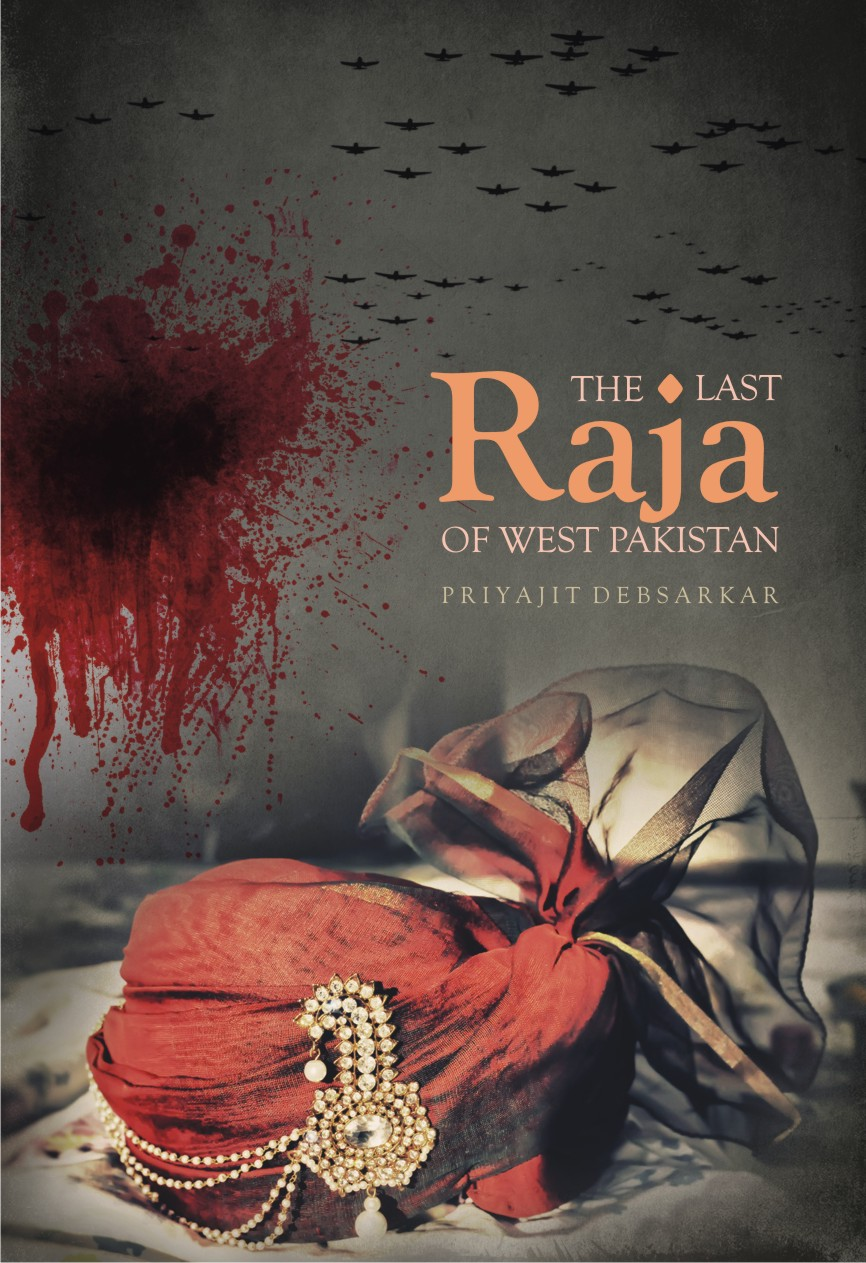
- Author: Priyajit Debsarkar
- Language: English
- Subject: History of Bangladesh, Culture of Bangladesh
- Publisher: Roman Books, Kolkata
- Publication place: India
- Media type: Print (hardcover)
- Pages: 150
- ISBN: 978-9383868162

The Last Raja of West Pakistan is a biography written about one of the last kings of East Pakistan (modern day Bangladesh). It is written by Priyajit Debsarkar, an Indian political analyst based in London.

The book describes the administration of Raja Tridiv Roy, the monarch of the Chakma tribe in Chittagong, East Pakistan. This book spans Roy's life from his coronation as king in 1953 until Bangladeshi independence in 1971–72.

The book is about Roy's decision to remain loyal to Pakistan while examining the unfavorable relations between West and East Pakistan at the advent of the Bangladesh Liberation War. It includes Roy's troubled personal life. After the conflict, Roy was treated as a national hero in Pakistan and several regimes in Pakistan awarded him with ambassadorial positions.

The Indian Express gave the book a negative review, writing that "Priyajit Debsarkar has neither the dramatic flourish and skill that is needed to tell the story of a gambler who gave away a winning hand, nor the training and depth of understanding that writing the history of a nation's birth requires. The result is an amateur yarn that seems to be based entirely on secondary sources (the famous story of the Agartala Conspiracy Case, pp 48-50, bears an intriguing resemblance to the Wikipedia entry on that topic), a 35-odd page list of references and bibliography, unusual for a book that has only 160-odd pages in all, notwithstanding. There is no evidence that anyone in Pakistan, Bangladesh or India was interviewed, surprising for a commentary on a man who was alive only three years ago.".
