= Rajpunyah =

Bangladeshi folk festival

Rajpunyah (Bengali: রাজপুণ্যাহ) is a conventional celebration where the people of the Chittagong Hill Tracts of Bangladesh assemble to pay taxes to their tribal kings. The festival takes place every five or six years, though it was previously held annually. Following this occasion, a folk fair is held for three days. For the people of the Chittagong Hill Tracts, Rajpunyah is one of the largest festivals. Thousands of tourists visit Bandarban every year during the festival.

== History ==
The Rajpunyah festival was first introduced during British rule. The Bohmong kings started organising the Rajpunyah festival in 1875 to collect jhum tax. The ninth Bohmong king started the formal tax collection in 1875. However, after the death of the 14th Bohmong King Manshaiprue Chowdhury in the 1990s, Rajpunyah did not take place for two years.

== Festival ==
Rajpunyah is better known as Poingjara Powaye to various local tribal communities. The Chakma Circle celebrates Rajpunyah in Rangamati. and the Bohmong Circle arranges Rajpunyah in Bandarban. According to the tradition, the king collects taxes by organizing a fair at the beginning of the year. At the Rajpunyah ceremony, the headmen of the mouzas under the king paid tribute to him and expressed their allegiance. Later the king addresses the people and rewards the tribals who have contributed in various fields.

The king ascends the royal throne through thousands of flower rugs. Later, one by one, the king receives taxes and various gifts from the people. Every year in Bandarban, during Rajpunyah, the courtyard of the palace becomes a unique gathering place for the tribal peoples and the Bengalis. Rajpunyah fair also attracted thousands of domestic and foreign tourists. As a result, there is an acute seat crisis in hotels and motels in Bandarban during Rajpunyah. This traditional fair of the hill has circus, puppet dance, indigenous instrumental music, dance, song, drama staging and the whirligigs. Besides, businessmen set up hundreds of shops with different products.

== See also ==
- Culture of Bangladesh
- Tribal monarchy in Chittagong Hill Tracts
- Tribal peoples of Chittagong Hill Tracts
