= Chakma Circle =

Tribal chieftaincy in Bangladesh

Chakma Circle 𑄌𑄇𑄴𑄟𑄳𑄦 𑄥𑄢𑄴𑄇𑄬𑄣𑄴
- Coat of arms of Chakma Circle

- Flag of Chakma Circle
- Predecessor: Raja Tridev Roy
- Headquarters: Rangamati Hill District
- Location: Bangladesh
- Region served: Chittagong Hill Tracts
- Raja: Raja Devasish Roy

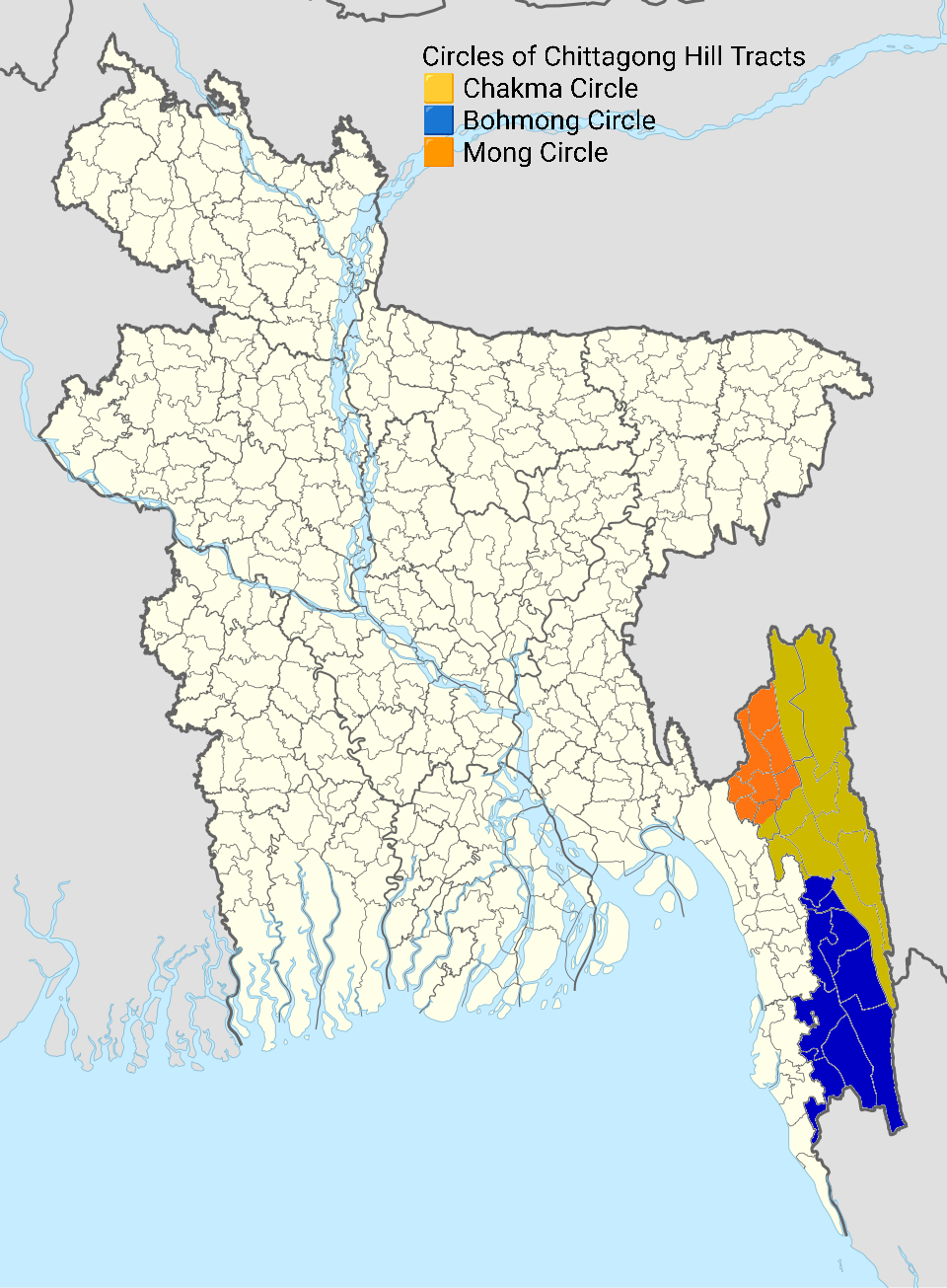
Circles of Chittagong Hill Tracts

The Chakma Circle (Chakma: 𑄌𑄇𑄴𑄟𑄳𑄦 𑄥𑄢𑄴𑄇𑄬𑄣𑄴, Bengali: চাকমা সার্কেল), also known as the Chakma Raj (Bengali: চাকমা রাজ), is one of three hereditary chiefdoms (or "Circles") in the Chittagong Hill Tracts of modern-day Bangladesh. The Chakma Circle encompasses Rangamati Hill District (excluding Rajasthali Upazila and 5 mouzas of Kaptai Upazila) and 21 Mouzas Dighinala Upazila and 12 mouzas Lakshmichhari Upazilas of neighbouring Khagrachari District. The chiefdom's members are of Chakma descent.

== Leadership ==
The Chakma Circle is led by a hereditary chieftain called a raja, whose role encompasses judicial, administrative, ceremonial, legal and social responsibilities. Political power is passed from the father to the first-born son.

The incumbent chieftain is Devasish Roy (b. 10 April 1959), according to the Chakma Bijok, a compilation of the Chakma history (1876-1934 CE). The Chakma chieftain also sits on the Advisory Council for the Ministry of Chittagong Hill Tracts Affairs and the Rangamati Hill District Council. The Chakma chieftain leads a rajpunyah festival.

== History ==
=== Pre-colonial era ===
The lineage of Chakma chieftains may date to the 11th century or mid-16th century. Chakma folklore and tradition ascribe the Chakma origins to the warrior castes of Bhagalpur in modern-day India. The legendary raja Bijoy Giri (c. 1630), who is believed to have migrated the ancestors of the Chakma people north of the Naf River. Through intermarriages with the Rakhine people, the Chakmas eventually converted to Buddhism. Extant historical records date to the 1700s. Following the expansion of the Mughal Empire into Chakma territory, Chakma chieftains adopted Mughal names and titles (e.g., Khan) in exchange for tributary payments.

=== British rule and modern era ===
During British rule, the Chittagong Hill Tracts were administratively divided into three circles in 1884, namely the Chakma Circle, the Bohmong Circle, and the Mong Circles, each presided over by a hereditary chief from the Chakma and Marma peoples. The circles were codified into law with the Chittagong Hill Tracts Regulations, 1900, which eased revenue collection and administrative burdens on British authorities by delegating tax collection, land administration management and social arbitration responsibilities to the chieftains. In 1901, the Bohmong Circle extended 2,421 square miles (6,270 km^{2}). This administrative structure remained in place until 1964, when the introduction of local self-government abolished the special status of these circles and brought local administration under the control of the central government.

== See also ==
- Chakma people
- Marma people
- Bohmong Circle
- Mong Circle
