= Chittagong Hill Tracts =

Region in southeastern Bangladesh

Coordinates: 22°33′00″N 92°17′00″E

Chittagong Hill Tracts পার্বত্য চট্টগ্রাম
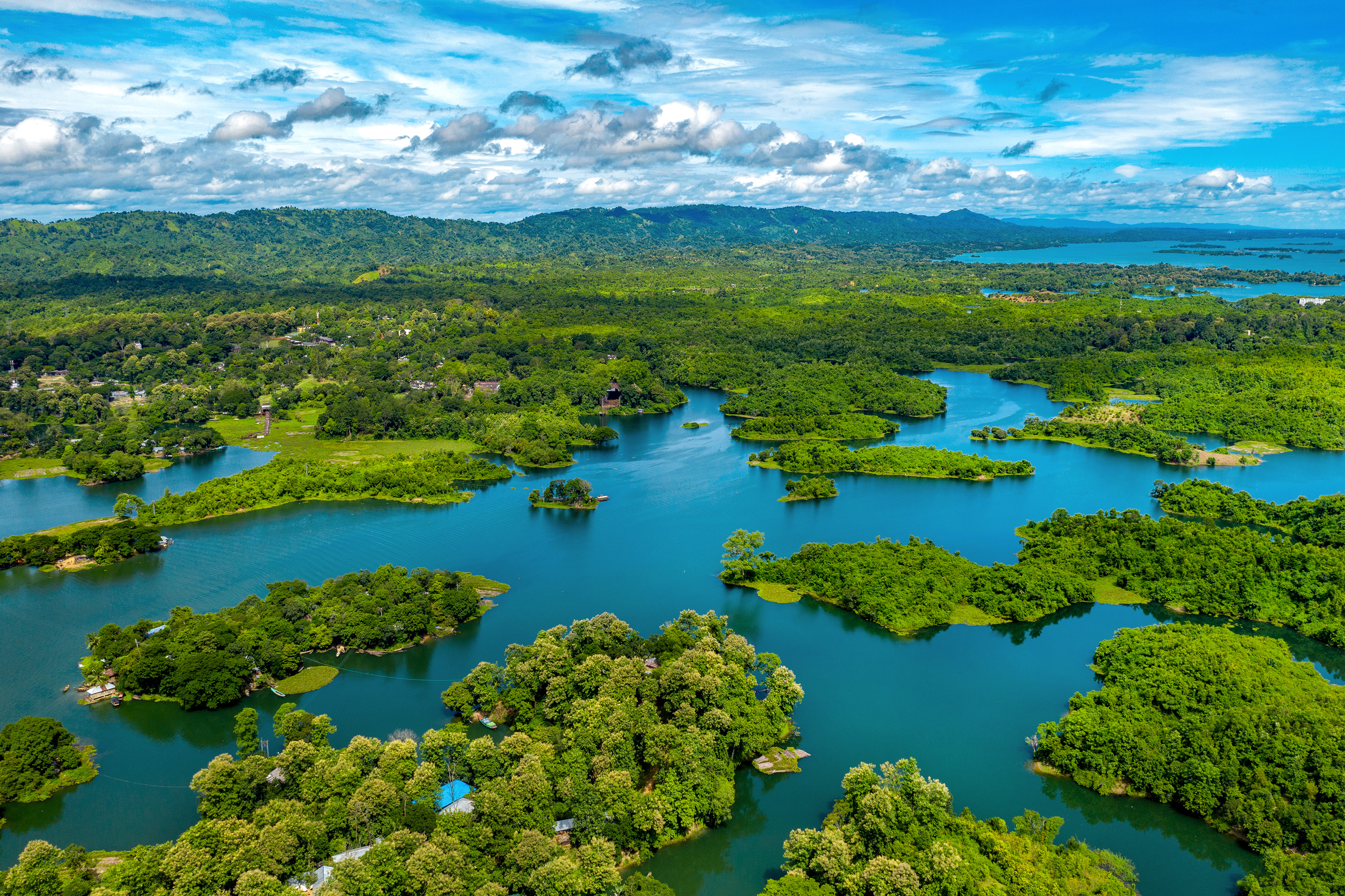
- Kaptai National Park

- The three current Chittagong Hill Tracts statistical districts combined shown within Bangladesh.
- Country: Bangladesh
- Division: Chittagong
- Districts: Bandarban • Khagrachhari • Rangamati
- Upazilas: Alikadam • Bagaichhari • Bandarban Sadar • Barkal • Belaichhari • Dighinala • Guimara • Juraichhari • Kaptai • Kawkhali • Khagrachhari Sadar • Lakshmichhari • Langadu • Lama • Mahalchhari • Manikchhari • Matiranga • Naikhongchhari • Naniarchar • Panchhari • Rajasthali • Ramgarh • Rangamati Sadar • Rowangchhari • Ruma • Thanchi

Area
  - Total: 13,344.3 km^{2} (5,152.3 sq mi)
  - Land: 12,052.8 km^{2} (4,653.6 sq mi)
  - Water: 1,291.5 km^{2} (498.7 sq mi)
- Elevation: 17 m (56 ft)

Population (2022)
  - Total: 1,842,815
  - Density: 152.895/km^{2} (395.997/sq mi)

Demographics
  - Ethnicities: Bengalis, Chakmas, Rakhines, Marmas, Tripuris, Tanchangyas, Chaks, Pankhos, Mrus, Bawms, Lushais, Khyangs, Khumis
  - Religions (2022 census): 44.5% Islam; 41.7% Buddhism; 9.18% Hinduism; 3.26% Christianity; 1.30% Others
- Time zone: BST
  - Summer (DST): +06:00

The Chittagong Hill Tracts (Bengali: পার্বত্য চট্টগ্রাম, romanised: Pārbôtyô Côṭṭôgrām), often shortened to simply the Hill Tracts and abbreviated to CHT, includes the three hilly districts within the Chittagong Division in southeastern Bangladesh, bordering India and Myanmar (Burma) in the east: Khagrachhari, Rangamati, and Bandarban. Covering 13,295 square kilometres (5,133 mi^{2}), CHT is an extensively hilly area and home to a variety of tribal peoples in Bangladesh. The CHT were divided by the British in the 19th century into three tribal chieftaincies, the Chakma Circle, the Mong Circle and the Bohmong Circle. They formed a single district until 1984, when they were divided into three separate districts.

== Geography ==
The Chittagong Hill Tracts (CHT) is an extensive hilly area in Bangladesh, lie in the southeastern part of the country (210 25' N to 230 45' N latitude and 910 54' E to 920 50' E longitude) bordering the Indian state of Tripura on the north, Rakhine State of Myanmar on the south, Chin state of Myanmar and Indian state Mizoram on the east, Chittagong District and Cox's Bazar District on the west. The area of the Chittagong Hill Tracts is about 13,184 km^{2}, which is approximately one-tenth of the total area of Bangladesh. The Chittagong Hill Tracts combine three hilly districts of Bangladesh: Rangamati, Khagrachhari and Bandarban districts.

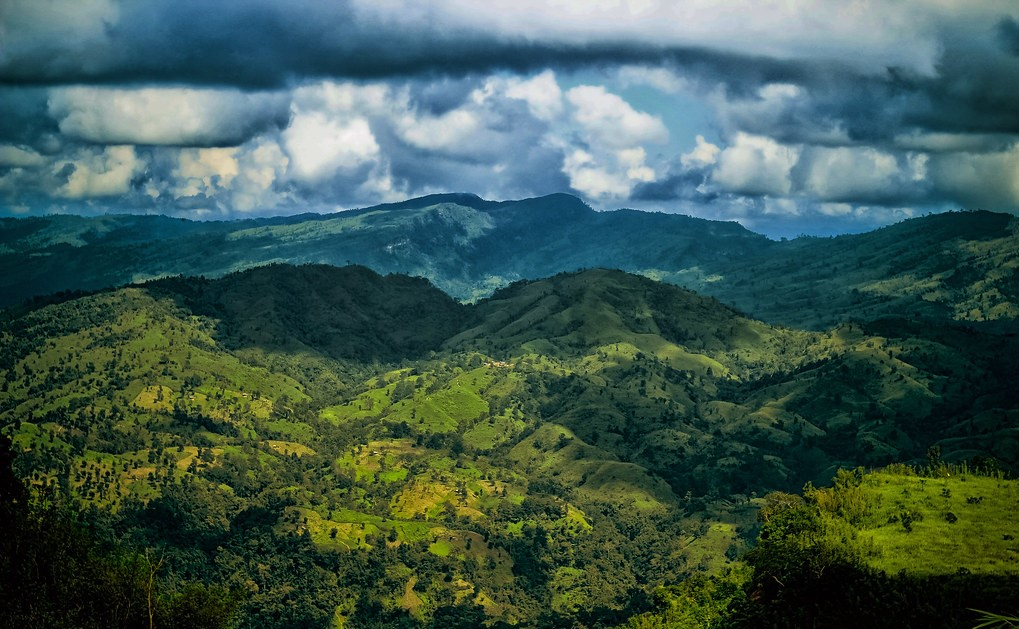
Keokradong, the highest peak of the Bangladesh situated in the region.

The mountainous rugged terrain with deep forests, lakes and falls gives it a different character from the rest of Bangladesh.

Saka Haphong, the highest peak of Bangladesh, is located here. Though officially Tazing Dong is declared as the highest peak, it is also located here. Keokradong is another famous peak in this area.

=== Topography ===
The landscape of the Chittagong Hill Tracts is predominantly hilly, featuring a series of parallel ridges with altitudes ranging from 200 to over 1,000 metres above sea level. The highest peak in Bangladesh, Keokradong (986 metres), is located in Bandarban District. The terrain consists of steep slopes, narrow valleys, and occasional flatlands, making it distinct from the rest of Bangladesh's floodplains. The Chittagong Hill Tracts are traversed by several important rivers, the largest being the Karnaphuli River, which originates in the hills and flows into the Bay of Bengal. The Kaptai Dam, built on the Karnaphuli River, has created Kaptai Lake, the largest artificial lake in Bangladesh. Other significant rivers include the Sangu, Matamuhuri, and Feni Rivers.

The region is home to tropical and subtropical evergreen forests, which support a rich diversity of flora and fauna. The forests include species such as teak, garjan, and bamboo. The wildlife of CHT features mammals like elephants, leopards, and deer, along with a variety of bird species. However, deforestation and human activities have led to ecological challenges in recent years.

The soil in the Chittagong Hill Tracts is mostly red and yellow sandy loam, which is less fertile compared to the alluvial soils of the Bangladeshi plains. Due to the steep slopes, jhum (slash-and-burn) cultivation is traditionally practiced by the indigenous communities. However, efforts are being made to introduce sustainable agricultural methods to prevent soil erosion and land degradation.

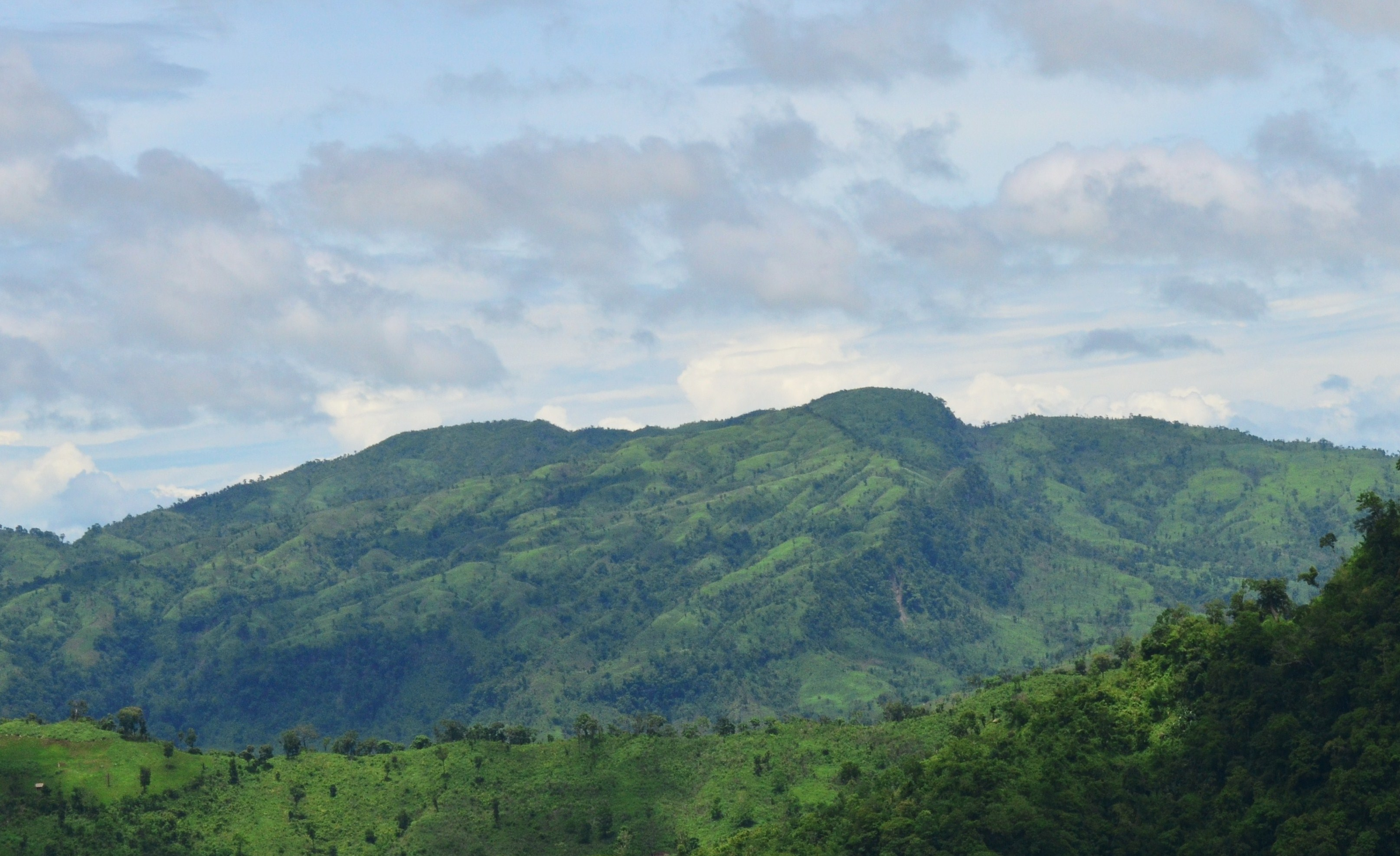
Dumlong peak

=== Natural resources ===
The region is rich in natural resources, including timber, bamboo, and various minerals. Kaptai Lake has also become an important source of hydroelectric power, contributing to Bangladesh's energy supply. However, environmental concerns have been raised due to deforestation, resource extraction, and changes in land use.

=== Land use and environment ===
==== Tobacco cultivation ====
Tobacco cultivation is damaging the ecology of the area, with the loss of indigenous trees such as Chukrasia tabularis (Indian mahogany), and soil fertility.

Most of the farmers of Rangamati, Bandarban, and Khagrachhari have been losing their interest in cultivating their own indigenous crops after defaulting on loans provided by tobacco companies.

==== Environmental issues ====
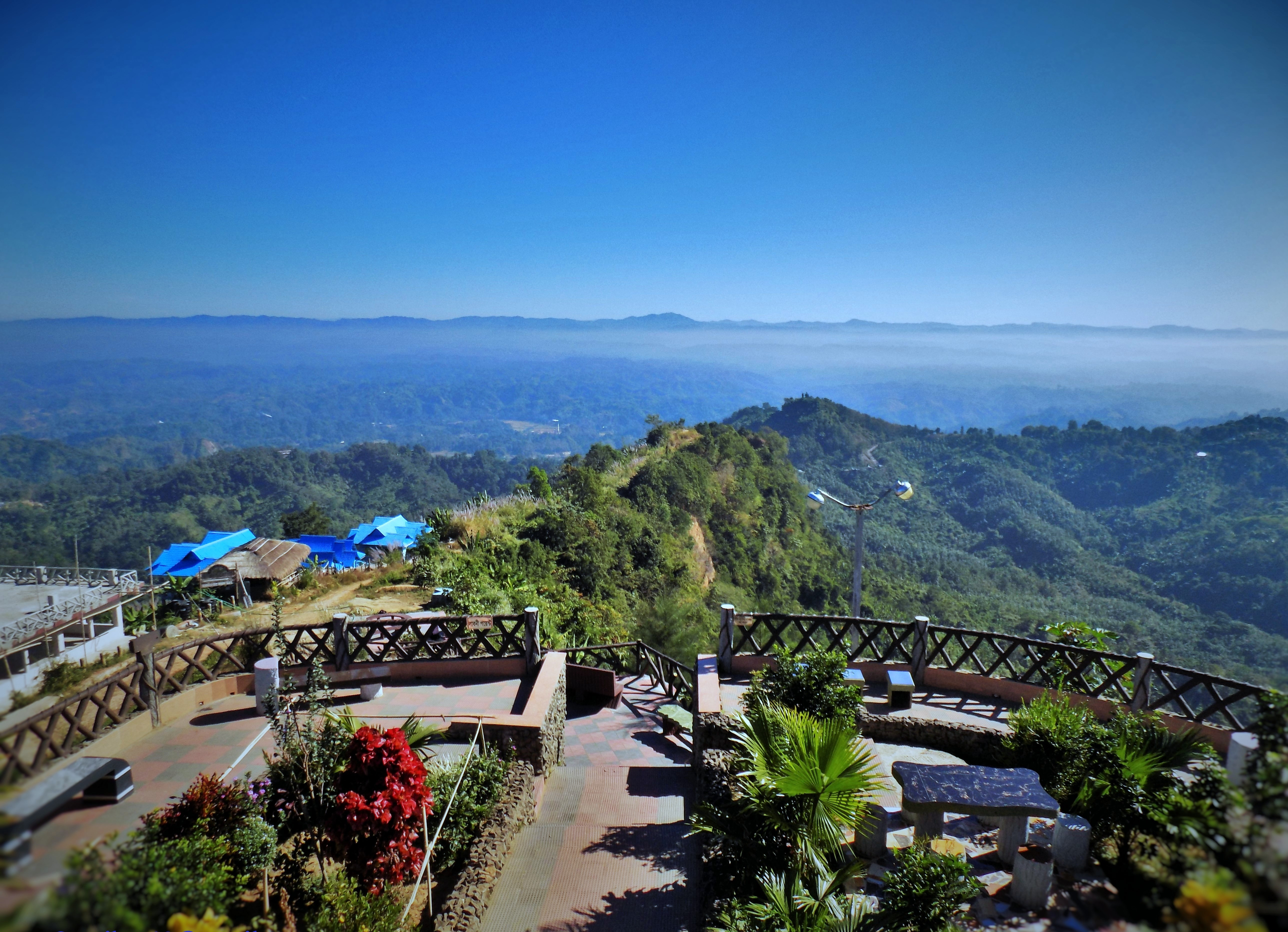
Nilachol, Bandarban

Like other mountainous areas in South and Southeast Asia, the Chittagong Hill Tracts are undergoing deforestation and land degradation arising from environmentally unsuitable activities such as tobacco cultivation in sloping land, shifting cultivation and logging. Shifting cultivation, also known as slash-and-burn agriculture or swidden cultivation, embraces a large variety of primitive forms of agriculture. It is a unique stage in the evolution from hunting and food gathering to sedentary farming. Humankind began to change its mode of life from food gatherer to food producer about 7000 B.C. by adopting shifting cultivation. Some form of shifting cultivation has been practised in most parts of the world, but more intensive forms of agriculture have subsequently replaced it.

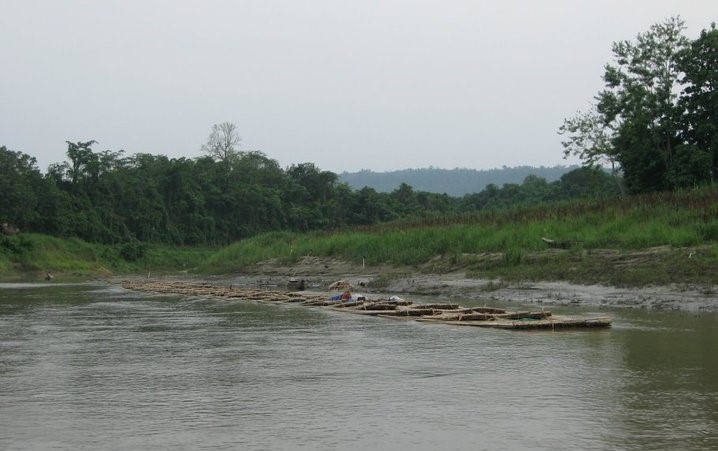
Bamboo Transportation to Karnaphuli Paper Mills, Kaptai, Rangamati

The present shifting cultivation system with short fallow periods in the Chittagong Hill Tracts has accelerated erosion, land degradation, deforestation, and impoverishment of tribal people in CHT. If the present state of degradation is continued, most of the areas under shifting cultivation will be severely degraded and future generations will face more difficulties in eking out their livelihoods on further degraded land, although there is some scope for shifting cultivators to leave the degraded fields and move to other areas. It is estimated that on average eight hectares of land is necessary for the sustenance of a family in the Chittagong Hill Tracts. If this ratio is adopted, 1,240,000 ha land is required to sustain the present population; however, the total land available, excluding the reserve forest, is 928,000 ha. Shifting cultivation, therefore, cannot fulfil even the subsistence requirements of the people. In such a situation, either large non-farm employment opportunities need to be created or more productive land-use systems need to be developed and adopted. Given the sluggish growth of the economy, there is limited scope for generating adequate non-farming employment opportunities in the near future. It is, therefore, imperative to replace the present shifting cultivation system with more productive and sustainable land use systems to enable people to secure their livelihoods.

=== Climate ===
The region experiences a tropical monsoon climate, with high temperatures and significant seasonal variations in precipitation. Annual rainfall averages between 2,000 and 3,500 millimetres, mostly occurring during the monsoon season from June to September. Winters are mild and dry, while summers are hot and humid.

Climate data for Chittagong Hill Tracts, 2005
Month	Jan	Feb	Mar	Apr	May	Jun	Jul	Aug	Sep	Oct	Nov	Dec	Year
Mean daily maximum °C (°F)	31.7 (89.1)	35.0 (95.0)	37.8 (100.0)	38.9 (102.0)	42.2 (108.0)	37.8 (100.0)	35.6 (96.1)	37.7 (99.9)	35.6 (96.1)	35.6 (96.1)	33.3 (91.9)	31.7 (89.1)	36.2 (97.2)
Daily mean °C (°F)	20.5 (68.9)	22.8 (73.0)	26.5 (79.7)	28.5 (83.3)	28.8 (83.8)	28.1 (82.6)	27.7 (81.9)	28.0 (82.4)	28.5 (83.3)	27.7 (81.9)	25.0 (77.0)	21.8 (71.2)	26.2 (79.2)
Mean daily minimum °C (°F)	6.7 (44.1)	7.2 (45.0)	11.1 (52.0)	17.2 (63.0)	19.4 (66.9)	20.6 (69.1)	22.8 (73.0)	22.2 (72.0)	22.2 (72.0)	18.3 (64.9)	12.8 (55.0)	9.4 (48.9)	15.8 (60.4)
Source: Khan (2005)

== Language ==
The Chittagong Hill Tracts (CHT) constitutes a zone of intense linguistic convergence, characterised by high ethnolinguistic vitality and diversity. The region serves as a meeting point for two major language families: Indo-European (specifically the Eastern Indo-Aryan branch) and Sino-Tibetan (specifically the Tibeto-Burman branch). While Bengali functions as the lingua franca for administration and inter-community commerce, the region is home to at least 11 distinct indigenous languages, each possessing unique phonological and morphological characteristics.

=== Indo-Aryan languages ===
Despite the prevalence of Tibeto-Burman languages in the region, the two larger indigenous languages- the Chakma and the Tanchangya are classified as Eastern Indo-Aryan language.

==== Chakma language ====
Linguists classify modern Chakma language as a divergent dialect of the Southeastern Bengali-Assamese continuum, closely related to Chittagonian (Chatgaya). However, it retains a Tibeto-Burman substrate, particularly in its vocabulary related to flora, fauna, and domestic life, suggesting a historical language shift where the community adopted a neighbouring Indo-Aryan tongue while retaining elements of their ancestral speech.

==== Tanchangya language ====
Closely related to Chakma, Tanchangya language is often mutually intelligible with it but maintains distinct phonological variations.

=== Tibeto-Burman Languages ===
The majority of the smaller indigenous communities speak languages belonging to the Tibeto-Burman language family. These are further categorised into distinct branches:

Rakhine language

The Marma people speak Rakhine language, which belongs to the Lolo-Burmese language branch. It is tonal and mutually intelligible with dialects spoken in the neighbouring Rakhine State of Myanmar.

Kokborok language

This is classified under Boro-Garo languages speak by Tripuri people.

Kuki-Chin language

This branch includes the Bawm language, Pangkhua language, Lushai language, Khumi language and Khyang language. These languages are agglutinative and are linguistically linked to the Chin language of Myanmar and the Mizo language of India.

Mro language

The Mro language is considered distinct within the Tibeto-Burman family, often classified under a separate Mruic languages branch due to its isolation. It preserves archaic linguistic features that have been lost in neighbouring Kuki-Chin language.

Sak language

This is classified under Luish languages speak by Chak people.

=== Writing systems and scripts ===
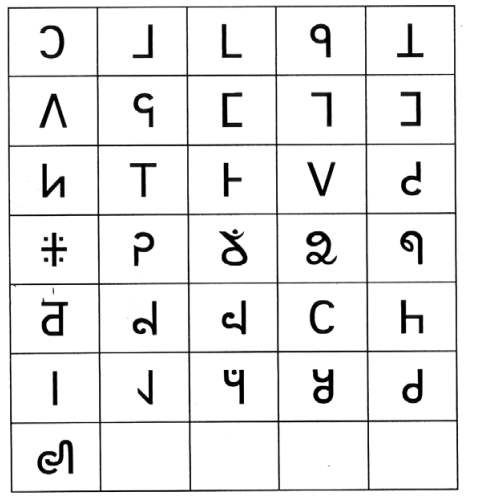

The CHT exhibits a "literary divide" reflecting historical religious influences. The scripts in use can be broadly categorised into Brahmic-derived, Roman, and Messianic inventions.

==== Brahmic scripts ====
The Chakma and Tanchangya languages use the Chakma script (Ajhā Pāṭh or Ojhopath), an abugida related to the Burmese script and Khmer script, historically preserved by village medicine men (Boidyos) for writing herbal charts and religious texts like the Agara Tara. The Marma use the Burmese script with minor regional variations.

==== Roman script ====
The Kuki-Chin linguistic groups (Bawm, Lushei, Pangkhua) predominantly use the Roman script. This adoption was largely driven by Christian missionaries in the late 19th and early 20th centuries who translated religious texts into local vernaculars using Latin orthography.

==== Mro (Krama) script ====
Uniquely, the Mro people utilise a "messianic" script known as Mro Chai (or the Krama script), which was revealed/created in the 1980s by a Mro leader named Menlay Mro. It was developed as a rejection of both Roman and Bengali scripts to preserve Mro cultural autonomy.

=== Sociolinguistics and preservation ===
The sociolinguistic landscape of the CHT is characterised by widespread bilingualism and diglossia. While indigenous languages are used in the domestic sphere (Low variety), Bengali serves as the language of education, law, and administration (High variety). This dynamic has led to significant lexical borrowing, or code-mixing, where Bengali terms are frequently incorporated into indigenous speech.

In 2017, in an effort to curb language endangerment, the Government of Bangladesh's National Curriculum and Textbook Board (NCTB) launched the Mother Tongue-Based Multilingual Education (MTB-MLE) programme. Textbooks were distributed in five indigenous languages—Chakma, Marma, Kokborok (Tripura), Garo, and Sadri—for pre-primary levels. However, critics note that the initiative faces hurdles, including a shortage of trained native-speaking teachers and the absence of a curriculum for higher grades.

== History ==
It has been a warzone between the Arakan Kingdom, Chakma kingdom and the Twipra Kingdom.

In the early 13th century the Chakma people settled from Arakan (Burma) before the Mughal and Bengali people settlement, due to defeat from the Rakhine king. The Chakmas are the single largest indigenous group, comprising half of the indigenous population. The Marma people are the second largest tribe. The place was ruled by the Chakma king and Tripura king. There was a conflict between the Chakma king and Mughals in which the Chakma king agreed to pay tribute of cotton to the Mughals.

Mughal and early British records name the region Jum Bungoo, Jum mahal or Kapas mahal. In 1787, the East India Company made the region its tributary after battling Chakma raja and agreeing on peace treaty.

Under British control, the British East India Company in order to suppress the Chakma queen power Kalindi Rani divided the hills into three parts. This was done in regional areas known as Chakma Circle, Mong Circle, and Bohmong Circle. The early colonial history of the Chittagong Hill Tracts is a record of recurring raids by the eastern hill indigenous (Mizo or Lushai) and of the operations undertaken by the British to repress them.

=== British rule ===
The use of the name Chittagong for this area dates to the 1860 British annexation of the region, bringing it under the direct control of British India. Situated beyond the inland hills, Chittagong proper is a coastal area in the plains where the British were based. As colonial influence grew, "Chittagong" enlarged as well, expanding eastwards to subsume the Hill Tracts under its revenue-collection territory.

The recorded population increased from 69,607 in 1872 to 101,597 in 1881, to 107,286 in 1891, and to 124,762 in 1901. The census of 1872 was, however, very imperfect, and the actual population growth probably did not exceed what might be expected in a sparsely inhabited but fairly healthy tract.

When the 1901 census was taken there were no towns, and 211 of the villages had populations of less than 500 apiece; only one exceeded 2,000. The population density, excluding the area of uninhabited forest (1,385 square miles), was 33 persons per square mile. There was a little immigration from Chittagong, and a few persons had emigrated to Tripura. The proportion of females to every 100 males was only 90 in the district-born and 83 in the total population. That time Buddhists numbered 100,000, Hindus 50,000, and Muslims 3,000.

== Demography ==
=== Ethnicity ===
According to the census of 2022, the population of the Rangamati District, Khagrachhari District, Bandarban District totaled 1,842,815, of whom 920,248 (49.94%) were tribal people. Population of ethnic minorities are: Chakma 454,925, Marma 209,783, Tripura 133,372, Mro 51,724, Tanchangya 42,943, Bom 12,311, Khyang 4,176, Khumi 3,341, Chak 2,725, Pankho 1,458 and Lushei 216. They differ markedly from the Bengali majority of Bangladesh in language, ethnicity and religion. The population density was roughly 153 per square kilometre.

Ethnicity in the Chittagong Hill Tracts (2022)
1. Bengali (50.1%)
2. Chakma (24.7%)
3. Marma (11.4%)
4. Tripura (7.23%)
5. Mro (2.80%)
6. Tanchangya (2.33%)
7. Bom (0.67%)
8. Khyang (0.23%)
9. Khumi (0.18%)
10. Chak (0.15%)
11. Pankho (0.08%)
12. Lushei (0.01%)
13. Others (0.20%)

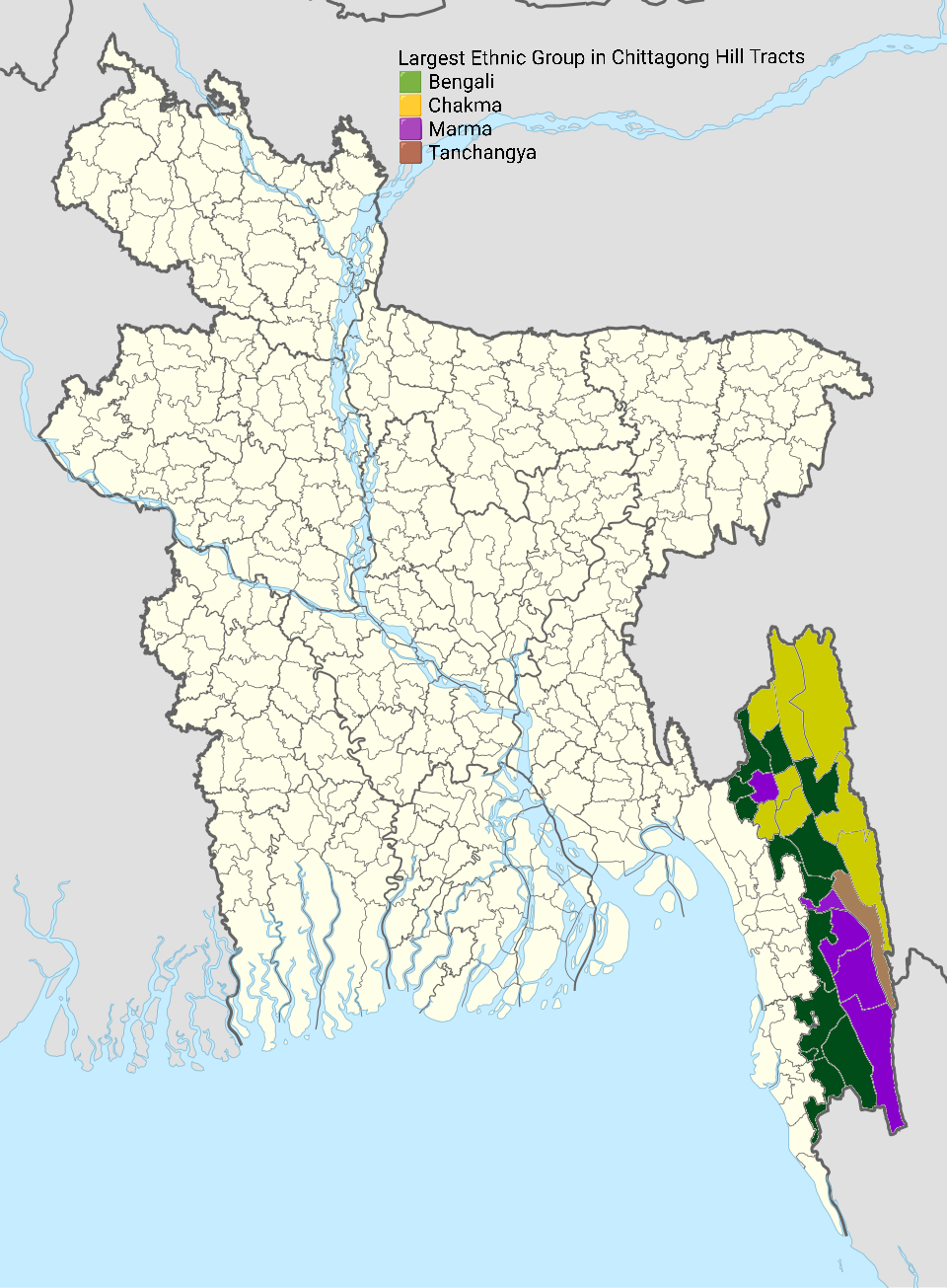
Largest Ethnic Group by Upazila in Chittagong Hill Tracts Based on The 2022 CensusPopulation by ethnicity in Upazila
Upazila	Bengali	Chakma	Marma	Others
Ali Kadam Upazila	60.60%	0.9 %	6.05 %	32.45%
Bagaichhari Upazila	28.2 %	66.2%	0.08%	5.52%
Bandarban Sadar Upazila	57%	1.5%	24.0%	17.5%
Barkal Upazila	29.0 %	69.3 %	0.88%	0.82%
Belaichhari Upazila	15.9%	26.7%	8.97%	48.43%
Dighinala Upazila	39 %	53.4 %	0.06%	7.9%
Guimara Upazila	35.6%	7.37%	38.1%	18.93%
Juraichhari Upazila	4.65%	91.2%	0.28%	3.87%
Kaptai Upazila	55.7%	2.25%	28.6%	13.45%
Kawkhali Upazila	44.9%	25.9%	27.9%	1.3%
Khagrachhari Sadar Upazila	40.8%	27.1%	10.9%	21.2%
Lakshmichhari Upazila	25.8%	51.3%	21.8%	1.1%
Lama Upazila	76.2%	0.25%	11.3%	12.25%
Langadu Upazila	76.5%	23.1%	0.01%	0.39%
Mahalchhari Upazila	37%	43.5%	15.31%	4.19%
Manikchhari Upazila	73.6%	1.93%	18.7%	5.77%
Matiranga Upazila	76.1 %	3.12%	2.07%	18.71%
Naikhongchhari Upazila	83.5%	0.18 %	6.16%	10.16%
Naniarchar Upazila	18.3%	79.9 %	1.74%	0.06%
Panchhari Upazila	33%	44.1%	3.12%	19.78%
Rajasthali Upazila	32.3 %	0.97%	36.6%	30.13%
Ramgarh Upazila	73.1%	2.77%	10.6%	13.53%
Rangamati Sadar Upazila	52.3%	41.2%	1.89%	4.61%
Rowangchhari Upazila	10.5%	0.69%	49.5%	39.31%
Ruma Upazila	13%	0.94%	31%	56%
Thanchi Upazila	12.4%	1.64%	31.4%	54.56%

Largest Ethnic Group by administrative units
Ethnic group	Unions	Municipalities	Upazilas	Districts
Bengali	50	7	12	2
Chakma	42	0	8	1
Marma	15	0	5	0
Tripura	7	0	0	0
Mro	4	0	0	0
Tanchangya	3	0	1	0
Bawm	1	0	0	0
Total	122	7	26	3

=== Religion ===
According to the 2022 Population and Housing Census of Bangladesh, Islam constitutes the largest religious group in the Chittagong Hill Tracts, accounting for 44.52% of the population, and represents the majority religion in 9 out of the 26 upazilas in the region. However, tribal residents are primarily adherents of Buddhism (41.74%).

Religion in the Chittagong Hill Tracts (2022)
1. Islam (44.5%)
2. Buddhism (41.7%)
3. Hinduism (9.18%)
4. Christianity (3.26%)
5. Other (1.30%)

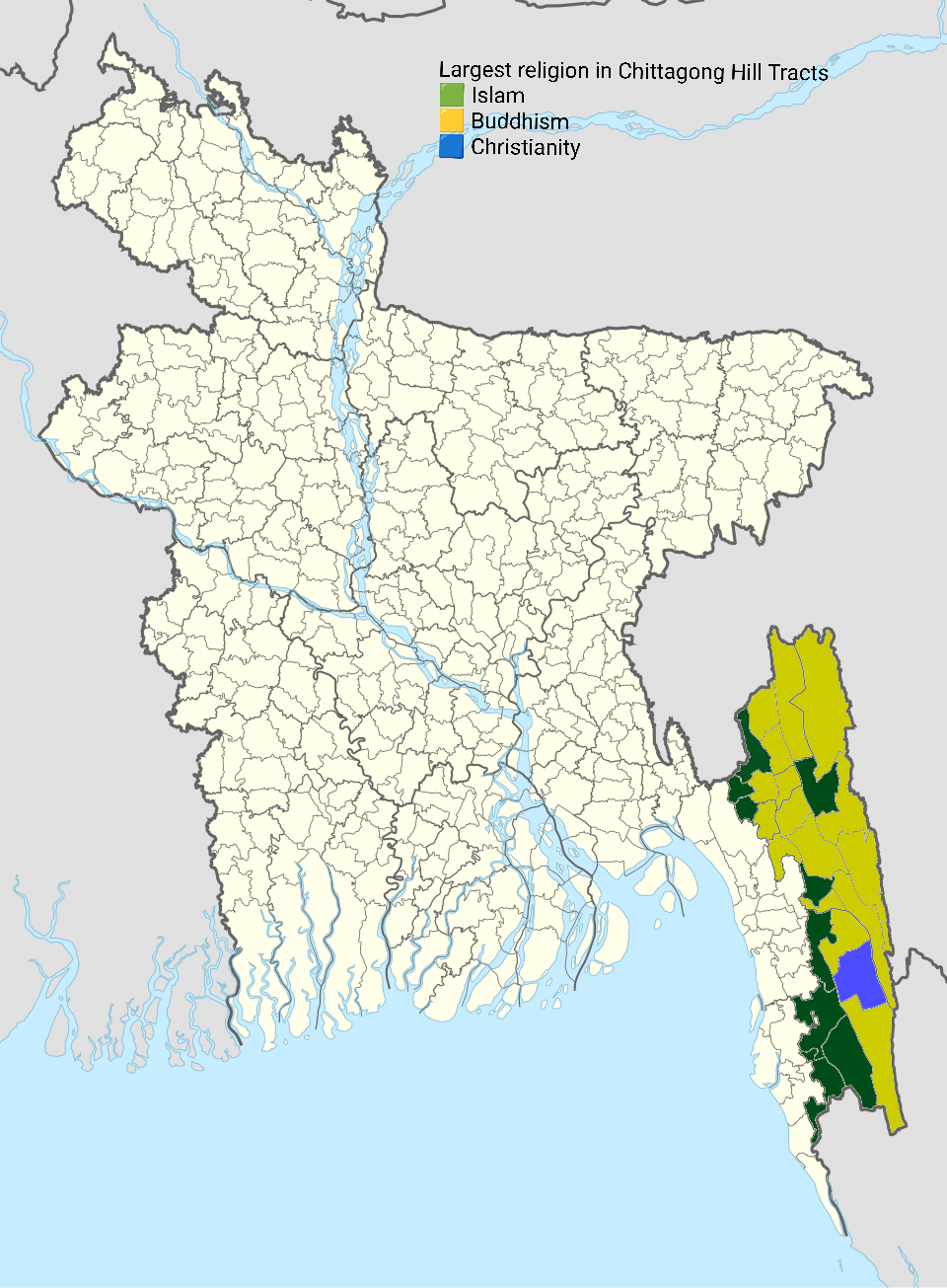
Largest religion in CHT by Upazila

Population by religion in Upazila
Upazila	Muslim	Buddhist	Christian	Hindu	Others
Ali Kadam Upazila	54.71%	30.54%	6.51%	3.03%	5.30%
Bagaichhari Upazila	24.74%	67.99%	0.57%	6.67%	0.03%
Bandarban Sadar Upazila	45.38%	36.88%	5.83%	7.85%	4.07%
Barkal Upazila	22.74%	75.81%	0.55%	0.87%	0.02%
Belaichhari Upazila	10.62%	78.21%	9.60%	1.24%	0.32%
Dighinala Upazila	35.70%	54.54%	0.33%	9.41%	0.02%
Guimara Upazila	30.60%	46.74%	0.12%	22.51%	0.03%
Juraichhari Upazila	3.26%	95.60%	0.52%	0.63%	0.00%
Kaptai Upazila	47.37%	45.35%	1.02%	6.23%	0.03%
Kawkhali Upazila	40.05%	56.76%	0.08%	3.09%	0.01%
Khagrachhari Sadar Upazila	34.98%	38.50%	1.75%	24.76%	0.01%
Lakshmichhari Upazila	20.07%	77.73%	0.13%	2.07%	0.00%
Lama Upazila	76.18%	17.09%	1.71%	2.92%	2.10%
Langadu Upazila	74.62%	23.74%	0.40%	1.23%	0.01%
Mahalchhari Upazila	30.94%	61.67%	0.41%	6.93%	0.05%
Manikchhari Upazila	68.01%	21.50%	0.29%	10.15%	0.05%
Matiranga Upazila	73.94%	5.58%	0.42%	19.73%	0.32%
Naikhongchhari Upazila	79.38%	19.41%	0.49%	0.70%	0.02%
Naniarchar Upazila	14.85%	83.18%	0.08%	1.87%	0.03%
Panchhari Upazila	30.78%	47.25%	0.50%	21.46%	0.10%
Rajasthali Upazila	21.92%	58.48%	10.83%	8.77%	0.00%
Ramgarh Upazila	65.48%	14.63%	0.41%	19.16%	0.32%
Rangamati Sadar Upazila	40.69%	48.50%	0.45%	10.29%	0.08%
Rowangchhari Upazila	7.87%	67.58%	17.83%	0.76%	5.97%
Ruma Upazila	7.38%	36.80%	37.32%	1.71%	16.79%
Thanchi Upazila	8.80%	42.34%	34.43%	1.55%	12.87%

Largest religion by administrative units
Religion	Unions	Municipalities	Upazillas	Districts
Buddhism	72	0	16	1
Islam	43	7	9	2
Hinduism	3	0	0	0
Christianity	2	0	1	0
Krama Religion	2	0	0	0
Total	122	7	26	3

== Education ==
The educational landscape of the Chittagong Hill Tracts (CHT) is distinct from the rest of Bangladesh, shaped by the region's rugged topography, linguistic diversity, and historical socio-political marginalisation. While literacy rates have improved significantly in the post-accord era (post-1997), the region continues to grapple with structural disparities, particularly in access to secondary education and the quality of instruction in remote areas.

=== Historical context and literacy ===
Historically, formal education in the CHT was spearheaded by Christian missionaries in the late 19th and early 20th centuries, particularly among the Bawm, Pankhua, and Lushai communities. This missionary influence resulted in these specific groups maintaining significantly higher literacy rates compared to both other indigenous groups and the national average.

According to the Population and Housing Census 2022, the literacy rate in the CHT varies significantly by district and ethnicity. Rangamati District records the highest literacy rate in the region, often exceeding the national average, whereas remote areas in Bandarban (such as Thanchi and Ruma upazilas) report rates as low as 28%.

=== Primary and para-centre education ===
Due to the difficult terrain and scattered settlement patterns (paras), the standard government primary school model is often inaccessible to children living in remote hills. To address this, the Chittagong Hill Tracts Development Board (CHTDB), in partnership with UNICEF, established a network of over 4,000 Para Centres (Integrated Community Development Projects). These centres serve as hubs for pre-primary education, functioning as feeder schools to mainstream primary institutions.

Despite high enrolment at the primary level, the region suffers from a high dropout rate. Factors include the distance of schools from settlements, seasonal agricultural labour (Jhum cultivation) requiring child participation, and teacher absenteeism in remote postings.

=== Language barrier and multilingual education (MLE) ===
A critical pedagogical challenge in the CHT has been the language of instruction. Historically, classes were conducted exclusively in Bengali, a language foreign to most indigenous children upon school entry. This "linguistic submergence" contributed to high repetition and dropout rates.

In line with the National Education Policy 2010, the government introduced Mother Tongue-Based Multilingual Education (MTB-MLE) in 2017. Pre-primary textbooks were developed in five indigenous languages: Chakma, Marma, Kokborok (Tripura), Garo, and Sadri. While this policy marked a paradigm shift, its implementation has been hindered by a lack of trained teachers proficient in these scripts and the absence of a localised curriculum for higher grades.

=== Higher education and affirmative action ===
To promote social mobility, the Government of Bangladesh maintains a quota system (affirmative action) for "Tribal/Ethnic Minority" students in public universities and specialised institutions (medical and engineering colleges). This policy has been instrumental in creating an educated indigenous middle class.

The region hosts several notable education institutions:

- Rangamati Science and Technology University (RMSTU): established in 2014, it is the first public university in the region, though its inception faced local resistance due to concerns over land acquisition and demographic shifts
- Rangamati Medical College: established in 2014 alongside the university
- Bandarban University: a public-private partnership aimed at increasing tertiary access in the southernmost district.
- Bangladesh Sweden Polytechnic Institute
- Rangamati Government High School
- Lakers' Public School and College
- Kaptai High School

== Bibliography ==
- Bangladesh: Militarization in the Chittagong Hill Tracts. The slow demise of the region's indigenous peoples. IWGIA report 14. Copenhagen: IWGIA, Organising Committee CHT Campaign and Shimin Gaikou Centre. May 2012
- Shapan Adnan & Ranajit Dastidar."Alienation of the Lands of Indigenous Peoples of the Chittagong Hill Tracts of Bangladesh". Dhaka: Chittagong Hill Tracts Commission & IWGIA. May 2011.
- Shelly, Mizanur Rahaman. (1992). "The Chittagong Hill Tracts of Bangladesh: The Untold Story". Dhaka, Bangladesh: Centre for Development Research, Bangladesh.
- "Life is not Ours: Land and Human Rights in the Chittagong Hill Tracts", Bangladesh. Copenhagen, Denmark: Organizing Committee, Chittagong Hill Tracts Campaign, 1991.
- Brauns, Claus-Dieter, "The Mrus: Peaceful Hillfolk of Bangladesh", National Geographic Magazine, February 1973, Vol. 143, No. 1

== Citations ==
- Rasul, Golam; Thapa, Gopal B. (2003). "Shifting Cultivation in the Mountains of South and Southeast Asia: Regional Patterns and Factors Influencing the Change". Land Degradation & Development. 14 (5): 495–508. Bibcode:2003LDeDe..14..495R. doi:10.1002/ldr.570. S2CID 128897922.
- Rasul, Golam; Thapa, Gopal B.; Zoebisch, Michael A. (2004). "Determinants of land-use changes in the Chittagong Hill Tracts of Bangladesh". Applied Geography. 24 (3): 217–240. Bibcode:2004AppGe..24..217R. doi:10.1016/j.apgeog.2004.03.004.
- Rasul, Golam; Thapa, Gopal B. (2006). "Financial and economic suitability of agroforestry as an alternative to shifting cultivation: The case of the Chittagong Hill Tracts, Bangladesh". Agricultural Systems. 91 (1–2): 29–50. Bibcode:2006AgSys..91...29R. doi:10.1016/j.agsy.2006.01.006.
- Rasul, Golam (2007). "Political Ecology of the Degradation of Forest Commons in the Chittagong Hill Tracts of Bangladesh". Environmental Conservation. 34 (2): 153–163. Bibcode:2007EnvCo..34..153R. doi:10.1017/S0376892907003888. S2CID 86078323.
- Rasul, Golam; Thapa, Gopal B. (2007). "The Impact of Policy and Institutional Environment on Costs and Benefits of Sustainable Agricultural Land Uses: The Case of the Chittagong Hill Tracts, Bangladesh". Environmental Management. 40 (2): 272–283. Bibcode:2007EnMan..40..272R. doi:10.1007/s00267-005-0083-8. PMID 17562103. S2CID 20782180.
- Thapa, Gopal B.; Rasul, Golam (2006). "Implications of changing national policies on land use in the Chittagong Hill Tracts of Bangladesh". Journal of Environmental Management. 81 (4): 441–453. Bibcode:2006JEnvM..81..441T. doi:10.1016/j.jenvman.2005.12.002. PMID 16549239.
