= Merung Union =

Union of Khagrachhari District, Chittagong, Bangladesh

Merung মেরুং
- Union
- Interactive map of Merung
- Country: Bangladesh
- Division: Chittagong Division
- District: Khagrachhari District
- Upazila: Dighinala Upazila

Area
  - Total: 227.92 km^{2} (88.00 sq mi)

Population (2022)
  - Total: 45,522
  - Density: 199.73/km^{2} (517.29/sq mi)
- Time zone: UTC+6 (BST)
- Postal code: 4410
- Website: merungup.khagrachhari.gov.bd

Merung Union is a union of Dighinala Upazila under Khagrachhari District.

== Demography ==
According to 2022 census, total population of the Union are 45,522. Among them, 23,111 are Muslim, 17,551 are Buddhist, 4,761 are Hindu, 96 are Christian and 3 are follower of others religion.

Religion-2022
1. Islam (50.8%)
2. Buddhism (38.5%)
3. Hinduism (10.5%)
4. Christianity (0.21%)
5. Others (0.01%)

== Ethnicity ==
This Union is home to a variety of different ethnic groups. Among them, 24,081 are Bengali, 17,340 are Chakma, 4,075 are Tripura and 25 are of others ethnic groups.

Ethnicity-2022
1. Bengali (52.9%)
2. Chakma (38.1%)
3. Tripura (8.95%)
4. Others (0.05%)
