= Tridev Roy =

Pakistani politician

Tridev Roy; 𑄖𑄳𑄢𑄨𑄘𑄨𑄝𑄴 𑄢𑄧𑄠𑄴
- Raja
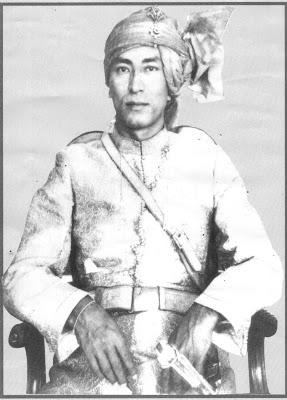

Chief of Chakma Circle
- Reign: 2 May 1953 – 16 December 1971
- Predecessor: Nalinaksha Roy
- Successor: Samit Roy

Minister of Minorities Affairs & Tourism
- In office 14 August 1973 – 22 October 1974
- President: Fazal Ilahi Chaudhry
- Prime Minister: Zulfikar Ali Bhutto
- Preceded by: Office established
- Succeeded by: Office abolished

Member of the East Pakistan Legislative Assembly
- In office 17 December 1970 – 17 April 1971
- Preceded by: Maung Shwe Prue Chowdhury
- Succeeded by: Constituency dissolved
- Constituency: PE-150 (Chittagong Hill Tracts)

Ambassador of Pakistan to Argentina
- In office 1981–1995
- President: Zia-ul-Haq; Ghulam Ishaq Khan
- Prime Minister: Muhammad Khan Junejo
- Preceded by: Abdul Sattar
- Succeeded by: Khalid Mehmood

High Commissioner of Pakistan to Sri Lanka
- In office 1995–1996
- President: Ghulam Ishaq Khan
- Prime Minister: Benazir Bhutto
- Preceded by: Ashraf Qazi
- Succeeded by: Ashraf Qazi

Personal details
- Born: 14 May 1933 Rangamati District, Chittagong Hill Tracts, British India
- Died: 17 September 2012 (aged 79) Islamabad, Pakistan
- Party: Pakistan People's Party
- Children: Devasish Roy
- Parents: Nalinaksha Roy (father); Benita Roy (mother)
- Occupation: Writer, politician, diplomat

Raja Tridiv Roy (Urdu: تری دیو رائے; Chakma: 𑄖𑄳𑄢𑄨𑄘𑄨𑄝𑄴 𑄢𑄧𑄠𑄴) sometimes spelled Tridev Roy, (14 May 1933 – 17 September 2012) was a Pakistani Buddhist politician, diplomat and writer who was Minister of Minorities Affairs & Tourism in the Zulfikar Ali Bhutto cabinet. He was also the 50th Raja of the Chakma tribe in the Chittagong Hill Tracts region of present-day Bangladesh from 2 May 1953, until his abdication in 1971 following the Bangladesh Liberation War. He chose to remain a Pakistani when Bangladesh achieved independence in 1971. He became known as a writer, diplomat, Buddhist religious leader and politician in Pakistan.

Between 1981 and 1995, he served as Ambassador of Pakistan to Argentina with concurrent accreditation in Chile, Uruguay, Peru and Ecuador. He was also a Minister-For-Life within the Pakistani government. Tridev Roy died in September 2012.

== Biography ==
Roy was born in 1933 in the Chakma Rajbari in Rangamati, Chittagong Hill Tracts, British India. He was the son of Raja Nalinaksha Roy. His mother Benita Roy was the granddaughter of Keshub Chandra Sen, a leading nineteenth century Brahmo Samaj leader and reformer of Bengal. Leading actress and danseuse Sadhana Bose and classical singer Naina Devi were his maternal aunts.

He was installed as the 50th Raja, or hereditary King of the Chakma Circle, on 2 May 1953. Roy abdicated the throne 1971 in favour of his son, Raja Devasish Roy, the current ruler of the Chakma people, during the Bangladesh Liberation War. Roy remained a practicing Buddhist, the predominant faith of the Chakma people, throughout his life.

Despite being heavily non-Muslim, the Chittagong Hill Tracts were awarded to Pakistan (specifically East Pakistan) by the British during the 1947 partition of India. The Chakmas and other people of the hill tracts had favored union with India instead of Pakistan. Initially granted special autonomy, the status of the region was changed by the Pakistani government during the 1950s to allow the settlement of large numbers of largely non-indigenous, Muslim Bengali settlers into the region. The Pakistani government also opened a hydro-electric dam, the Kaptai Dam in the early 1960s, which flooded about 40% of the Chakmas' available arable land. However, the Chakmas under Tridev Roy chose to remain neutral during the 1960s and 1970s as relations between the Pakistani Army and Mukti Bahini, which fought for Bangladeshi independence.

In 1970, Sheikh Mujibur Rahman, the head of the All-Pakistan Awami League and future founder of Bangladesh, asked Roy to run for Parliament as a member of the Awami League. Roy declined Rahman's offering, choosing instead to run in the 1970 general election as an independent. Roy won his election as independent candidate from his constituency in the Chittagong Hill Tracts.

Roy sided with Pakistan in 1971 Bangladesh Liberation War, which resulted in Bangladesh's independence. Following the war and Bangladesh's independence, Roy chose to move from the former East Pakistan to West Pakistan, where he resided for the rest of his life. Roy feared political persecution if he remained in Bangladesh after the country's independence, which led to his decision to move to Pakistan. He also felt that the new Bangladeshi government would no longer guarantee the special autonomous status of the Chittagong Hill Tracts. He abdicated as the Raja of the Chakmas in 1971 in favor of his son, Raja Debashish Roy, when he went into exile. The government of Pakistan made Roy a lifetime federal minister for his loyalty to the government in Islamabad during the war.

Roy headed a delegation from Pakistan to oppose Bangladesh's application to join the United Nations. The government of Bangladesh, under Sheikh Mujibur Rehman, sent its own delegation to New York to apply for admission led by Tridev Roy's mother Rajmata Benita Roy.

Roy joined the government of Zulfikar Ali Bhutto during the 1970s. Bhutto offered Roy the position of President of Pakistan once he became Prime Minister of Pakistan. However, Roy declined Bhutto's offer of the presidency because, under the new Constitution of Pakistan of 1973, only Muslims can become President of Pakistan. Roy, who called the presidency a "gilded cage," was unwilling to convert from Buddhism to Islam to hold the office. Bhutto was later overthrown by General Muhammad Zia-ul-Haq in 1977.

In 1981, Roy was appointed as Pakistani Ambassador to Argentina by the Zia government, a move which simultaneously removed him from day-to-day involvement in Pakistani politics. He was simultaneously accredited as an ambassador in Chile, Ecuador, Peru and Uruguay and he held these positions until 1995. He later was Pakistan's High Commissioner to Sri Lanka. He remained abroad until 1996, when he returned to Islamabad. Roy also held the position as a federal minister-for-life within the Pakistani government.

Roy, a leading figure in Pakistan's Buddhist community, headed the Pakistan Buddhist Society from 1996 until his death in 2012. In 2005, the High Commissioner of Sri Lanka, General Srilal Weerasooriya, on behalf of the President, conferred the emblems of the Sri Lanka Ranjana Award on Federal Minister Tridev Roy for his work on behalf of Pakistan's Buddhist community.

Tridiv Roy died from cardiac arrest at his home in Islamabad on 17 September 2012, at the age of 79. He is survived by his wife, Arati Roy, three sons, and two daughters.

== Legacy ==
The Express Tribune published an editorial the day following his death titled "The Raja who gave away his kingdom" on the diplomat's political career, excerpts of which are below:

Raja Tridiv Roy, minister-for-life, former government adviser, envoy and chief of the Chakma Tribals, died in Islamabad on Monday. He was 79. The late Raja Roy will be remembered as the man who gave away his kingdom so that he could be with Pakistan during one of the country's most turbulent periods...

A Buddhist by faith, Raja Tridiv Roy, left East Pakistan and came and joined the government of then president of Pakistan Zulfikar Ali Bhutto in the seventies. This despite the fact that he won the elections in 1971 as an independent candidate from his constituency. Roy's other distinction was that at one point he was also offered the position of President of Pakistan by Zulfikar Ali Bhutto, who himself had assumed the prime ministership of the country...

When Bhutto was deposed in 1977, Raja Tridiv Roy was carted off in 1981 on an ambassadorship to far away Argentina. He returned to Islamabad in 1996. After that, he was head of the Pakistan Buddhist Society.

== Books ==
Among his books, Tridiv Roy published his memoirs entitled, The Departed Melody. The book begins with the history and culture of the people of the Chittagong Hill Tracts and the Chakma Rajas. His other books and publications include Collection of Short Stories, which was translated to Urdu, and South American Diary.

== See also ==
- Devasish Roy
- Chandra Kalindi Roy Henriksen
- Chakma people
