= Dulyatali Union =

Union of Khagrachhari District, Chittagong, Bangladesh

Dulyatali দুল্যাতলী
- Union
- Interactive map of Dulyatali
- Country: Bangladesh
- Division: Chittagong Division
- District: Khagrachhari District
- Upazila: Lakshmichhari Upazila

Area
  - Total: 62.16 km^{2} (24.00 sq mi)

Population (2022)
  - Total: 7,554
  - Density: 121.5/km^{2} (314.7/sq mi)
- Time zone: UTC+6 (BST)
- Postal code: 4470
- Website: dulyataliup.khagrachhari.gov.bd

Dulyatali Union is a union of Lakshmichhari Upazila under Khagrachhari District.

== Demography ==
According to 2022 census, total population of the Union are 7,554. Among them, 1,532 are Muslim, 5,989 are Buddhist, 23 are Hindu and 11 are Christian.

Religion-2022
1. Buddhism (79.3%)
2. Islam (20.3%)
3. Hinduism (0.31%)
4. Christianity (0.15%)
5. Others (0.00%)

== Ethnicity ==
This Union is home to a variety of different ethnic groups. Among them, 2,326 are Bengali, 3,275 are Chakma, 1,943 are Marma, 8 are Tripura and 2 are of others ethnic groups.

Ethnicity-2022
1. Chakma (43.4%)
2. Bengali (30.8%)
3. Marma (25.7%)
4. Tripura (0.10%)
5. Others (0.03%)
