= Kabakhali Union =

Union of Khagrachhari District, Chittagong, Bangladesh

Kabakhali কবাখালী
- Union
- Interactive map of Kabakhali
- Country: Bangladesh
- Division: Chittagong Division
- District: Khagrachhari District
- Upazila: Dighinala Upazila

Area
  - Total: 46.62 km^{2} (18.00 sq mi)

Population (2022)
  - Total: 17,937
  - Density: 384.7/km^{2} (996.5/sq mi)
- Time zone: UTC+6 (BST)
- Postal code: 4410
- Website: kabakhaliup.khagrachhari.gov.bd

Kabakhali Union is a union of Dighinala Upazila under Khagrachhari District.

== Demography ==
According to 2022 census, total population of the Union are 17,937. Among them, 9,112 are Muslim, 8,706 are Buddhist, 69 are Christian and 50 are Hindu.

Religion-2022
1. Islam (50.8%)
2. Buddhism (48.5%)
3. Christianity (0.38%)
4. Hinduism (0.28%)
5. Others (0.00%)

== Ethnicity ==
This Union is home to a variety of different ethnic groups. Among them, 9,185 are Bengali, 8,717 are Chakma and 35 are of others ethnic groups.

Ethnicity-2022
1. Bengali (51.2%)
2. Chakma (48.6%)
3. Others (0.19%)
