= Mohalchhari Union =

Union of Khagrachhari District, Chittagong, Bangladesh

Mahalchhari মহালছড়ি
- Union
- Interactive map of Mahalchhari
- Country: Bangladesh
- Division: Chittagong Division
- District: Khagrachhari District
- Upazila: Mahalchhari Upazila

Area
  - Total: 51.8 km^{2} (20.0 sq mi)

Population (2022)
  - Total: 18,598
  - Density: 359/km^{2} (930/sq mi)
- Time zone: UTC+6 (BST)
- Postal code: 4430
- Website: mahalchariup.khagrachhari.gov.bd

Mahalchhari Union is a union of Mahalchhari Upazila under Khagrachhari District.

== Demography ==
According to 2022 census, total population of the Union are 18,598. Among them, 7,299 are Muslim, 9,171 are Buddhist, 2,095 are Hindu and 33 are Christian.

Religion-2022
1. Buddhism (49.3%)
2. Islam (39.2%)
3. Hinduism (11.3%)
4. Christianity (0.18%)
5. Others (0.05%)

== Ethnicity ==
This Union is home to a variety of different ethnic groups. Among them, 9,411 are Bengali, 5,483 are Chakma, 2,853 are Marma, 759 are Tripura and 92 are of others ethnic groups.

Ethnicity-2022
1. Bengali (50.6%)
2. Chakma (29.5%)
3. Marma (15.3%)
4. Tripura (4.08%)
5. Others (0.50%)
