= Kayangghat Union =

Union of Khagrachhari District, Chittagong, Bangladesh

Kayangghat ক্যায়াংঘাট
- Union
- Interactive map of Kayangghat
- Country: Bangladesh
- Division: Chittagong Division
- District: Khagrachhari District
- Upazila: Mahalchhari Upazila

Area
  - Total: 51.8 km^{2} (20.0 sq mi)

Population (2022)
  - Total: 8,952
  - Density: 173/km^{2} (448/sq mi)
- Time zone: UTC+6 (BST)
- Postal code: 4430
- Website: kayangghatup.khagrachhari.gov.bd

Kayangghat Union is a union of Mahalchhari Upazila under Khagrachhari District.

== Demography ==
According to 2022 census, total population of the Union are 8,952. Among them, 1,348 are Muslim, 7,452 are Buddhist, 145 are Christian and, 7 are Hindu.

Religion-2022
1. Buddhism (84.2%)
2. Islam (15.1%)
3. Christianity (1.62%)
4. Hinduism (0.08%)
5. Others (0.00%)

== Ethnicity ==
This Union is home to a variety of different ethnic groups. Among them, 1,708 are Bengali, 7,225 are Chakma and 19 are of others ethnic groups.

Ethnicity-2022
1. Chakma (80.7%)
2. Bengali (19.1%)
3. Others (0.21%)
