= Maischhari Union =

Union of Khagrachhari District, Chittagong, Bangladesh

Maischhari মাইসছড়ি
- Union
- Interactive map of Maischhari
- Country: Bangladesh
- Division: Chittagong Division
- District: Khagrachhari District
- Upazila: Mahalchhari Upazila

Area
  - Total: 38.85 km^{2} (15.00 sq mi)

Population (2022)
  - Total: 13,828
  - Density: 355.9/km^{2} (921.9/sq mi)
- Time zone: UTC+6 (BST)
- Postal code: 4430
- Website: maischariup.khagrachhari.gov.bd

Maischhari Union is a union of Mahalchhari Upazila under Khagrachhari District.

== Demography ==
According to 2022 census, total population of the Union are 13,828. Among them, 6,537 are Muslim, 5,961 are Buddhist, 1,289 are Hindu, 19 are Christian and 22 are follower of others religion.

Religion-2022
1. Islam (47.3%)
2. Buddhism (43.1%)
3. Hinduism (9.32%)
4. Christianity (0.14%)
5. Others (0.16%)

== Ethnicity ==
This Union is home to a variety of different ethnic groups. Among them, 6,943 are Bengali, 3,267 are Chakma, 2,400 are Marma, 1,172 are Tripura and 43 are of others ethnic groups.

Ethnicity-2022
1. Bengali (50.2%)
2. Chakma (23.6%)
3. Marma (17.4%)
4. Tripura (8.48%)
5. Others (0.31%)
