= Bijoy Giri =

Raja Bijoy Giri was the 15th Chakma Raja of the Chakma Circle.

== Personal life ==
He was the son of 14th Chakma Raja Sambuddha and was made Yuvaraj (Crown Prince) in his adolescence. He had a younger brother the Prince Udai Giri.

== History ==
He lived during 7th centuries CE.

When he was Yuvaraj (Crown Prince) he crossed the River Tewa and travelled six days by water with seven chamus or 26,000 troops into a place called Kalabagha and captured three countries - Teknaf, Indang Hills and Krindang Hills.

Senapati General Radha Mohan Khisa the Commander in Chief of the Chakma National Army led the army to victory in the battlefield himself.

After their military success they received news that Raja Sambuddha had died and Prince Udai Giri had usurped the throne.

Bijoy Giri decided to remain in the conquered territories in order to avoid a fratricidal conflict if he returned home and also instructed his troops and following to follow suit.

Majority of the army remained as they were loyal to him and took local "Ari" (Arakanese or Rakhine) women as wives.

It may be argued that the Tanchangya and Daingnet people are descendants of Udai Giri and the older part of the Chakma Kingdom whose capital was known as Champaknagar.

== Debate ==
There are debating between Reang and Chakmas about Bijoygiri.

According to reang people, Bijoygiri was the great commander of Manikya Dynasty who fought against Kuki Kingdom and won the battle. Bijoygiri was Reang.

According to Chakma, Bijoygiri was the son of Chakma Chief Sambuddha
