= Babuchhara Union =

Union of Khagrachhari District, Chittagong, Bangladesh

Babuchhara বাবুছড়া
- Union
- Interactive map of Babuchhara
- Country: Bangladesh
- Division: Chittagong Division
- District: Khagrachhari District
- Upazila: Dighinala Upazila

Area
  - Total: 214.97 km^{2} (83.00 sq mi)

Population (2022)
  - Total: 15,416
  - Density: 71.712/km^{2} (185.73/sq mi)
- Time zone: UTC+6 (BST)
- Postal code: 4410
- Website: babuchharaup.khagrachhari.gov.bd

Babuchhara Union is a union of Dighinala Upazila under Khagrachhari District.

== Demography ==
According to 2022 census, total population of the Union are 15,416. Among them, 1,786 are Muslim, 13,024 are Buddhist, 547 are Hindu, 56 are Christian and 3 are follower of others religion.

Religion-2022
1. Buddhism (84.5%)
2. Islam (11.6%)
3. Hinduism (3.55%)
4. Christianity (0.36%)
5. Others (0.02%)

== Ethnicity ==
This Union is home to a variety of different ethnic groups. Among them, 2,074 are Bengali, 12,927 are Chakma, 336 are Tripura and 79 are of others ethnic groups.

Ethnicity-2022
1. Chakma (83.9%)
2. Bengali (13.4%)
3. Tripura (2.18%)
4. Others (0.51%)
