= Boalkhali Municipality =

Coordinates: 22.3749°N 91.9198°E

- Municipality
- Interactive map of Boalkhali Municipality
- Country: Bangladesh

Area
  - Total: 15.8 km^{2} (6.1 sq mi)

Population
  - Total: 51,965

Boalkhali Municipality is a self-governed entity that governs the town of Boalkhali in Chittagong District, Bangladesh. It is a part of Chittagong Division.

It was formed by former East Gomdandi Headquarter Union and one to six units of West Gomdandi union and one to three units of Kadhurkil Union Parishad.

== Governance ==
The area includes nine election units or wards. Every unit's voters elect one councillor and one female councillor by three units/wards.

== Geography ==
Boalkhali Municipality is located about 14 km east of Chittagong District and is west of Boalkhali Upazila. Khadurkhil Union is to the northeast of Khadurkhil and Popadia and the Saroathali Union of Boalkhali Municipality. To its south is Shakpura and to its west is Gomdandi union. Kharnafully river is situated in Boalkhali Municipality.

== Naming ==
The name comes from religious scholar and Islamic spiritual Hazarat Bu-ali kandahar Shah (RW). The upazila municipality name is also Boalkhali.

== Administration ==
Boalkhali Municipality is formed by the East Gomdandi Union, 1 to 6 NO union word of West Gomdandi and 1 to 3 union word of Khadurkhil Union in October 2012.

Wordwise area of Boalkhali Municipality:

| Word NO | Boundary/Area | Locality/Area Name |
|---|---|---|
| 01 NO | East- Kazi Road ও DC Road West- Karnafully River North- Chowdhury Hat DC Road South- Koibortto Para RupMazi Road | |
| 02 No | East- Noor Mazi Canal, Chandaria Canal West- Khalurghat Vandarjuri Road North- Koibortto Para Road South- Corakhali Canal | |
| 03 No | East- Kashem Miah Cow Bazar Road West- Katakhali ও Chandiara Canal North- Chandiara Canal South- Katakhali and Munshi Para Road | |
| 04 No | East- Howla Road and Chandiara Canal West- Fateh Ali Bari Road North- Munshi Para Road and Ali Ahmed Commissioner Road South- Beyccakhai Canal | |
| 05 NO | East- East Gomdandi Janata Circular Road & East Gomdandi Chowdhury Para Road West- Jalil Vander Road North- Chandiara Canal South- Raikhali Canal & East Gomdandi Chowdhury Para Road | East Gomdandi Chowdhury Para; Daraf Para; Mufthi Para |
| 06 NO | East - Jalil Vander Road West- Yousup Talukder Para Road and Nayeb Ali Road North- Yousup Talukder Para Road South- Raikhali Canal | |
| 07 No | East- Nayeb Ali Road West- Mohan Bashi Road North- Howla DC Road South- Raikhali Canal | |
| 08 No | East- BecaGazi Road West- Mohan Bashi Road North- Howla DC Road South- Raikhali Canal | |
| 09 No | East- Yousup Talukder Para Road West- Karnafully River North- Chandiara Canal and Bori Mar Canal South- Mordoan Canal | |
