= Lakshmichhari Union =

Union of Khagrachhari District, Chittagong, Bangladesh

Lakshmichhari লক্ষ্মীছড়ি
- Union
- Interactive map of Lakshmichhari
- Country: Bangladesh
- Division: Chittagong Division
- District: Khagrachhari District
- Upazila: Lakshmichhari Upazila

Area
  - Total: 85.47 km^{2} (33.00 sq mi)

Population (2022)
  - Total: 12,763
  - Density: 149.3/km^{2} (386.8/sq mi)
- Time zone: UTC+6 (BST)
- Postal code: 4470
- Website: lakshmichariup.khagrachhari.gov.bd

Lakshmichhari Union is a union of Lakshmichhari Upazila under Khagrachhari District.

== Demography ==
According to 2022 census, total population of the Union are 12,763. Among them, 3,855 are Muslim, 8,461 are Buddhist, 440 are Hindu and 7 are Christian.

Religion-2022
1. Buddhism (66.3%)
2. Islam (30.2%)
3. Hinduism (3.45%)
4. Christianity (0.06%)
5. Others (0.00%)

== Ethnicity ==
This Union is home to a variety of different ethnic groups. Among them, 4,591 are Bengali, 5,957 are Chakma, 2,038 are Marma, 37 are Tripura and 140 are of others ethnic groups.

Ethnicity-2022
1. Chakma (46.7%)
2. Bengali (36.0%)
3. Marma (16.0%)
4. Tripura (0.29%)
5. Others (1.10%)
