= Mahalchhari Upazila =

Mahalchari মহালছড়ি
- Upazila
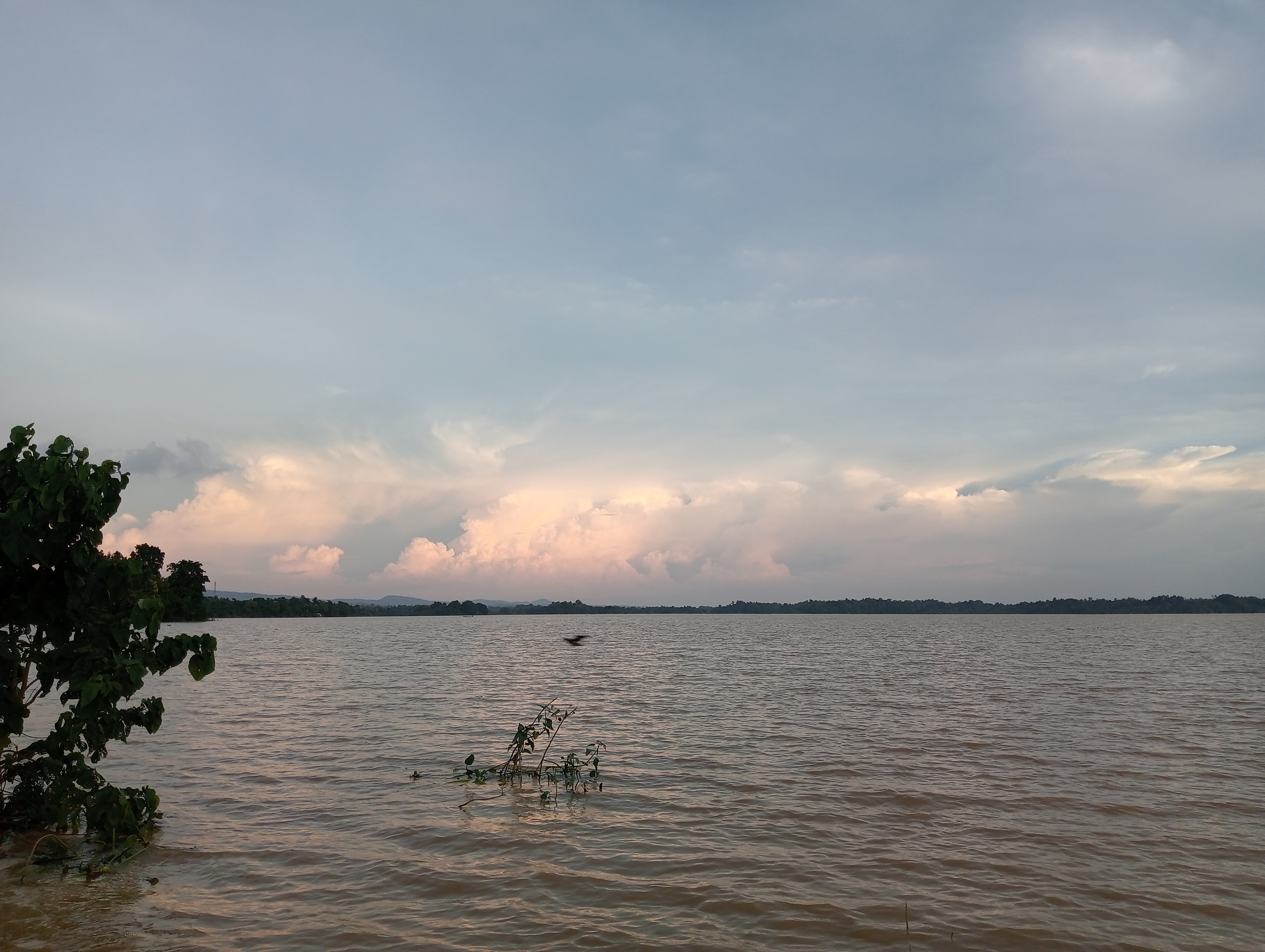
- View of Mahalchari After a Flood

- Coordinates: 22°55.2′N 92°1.5′E
- Country: Bangladesh
- Division: Chittagong
- District: Khagrachhari

Area
  - Total: 186.48 km^{2} (72.00 sq mi)

Population (2022)
  - Total: 49,077
  - Density: 263.18/km^{2} (681.62/sq mi)
- Time zone: UTC+6 (BST)
- Postal code: 4430
- Website: mohalchari.khagrachhari.gov.bd(in Bengali)

Mahalchhari Upazila mauza geocode map

Mahalchari (Bengali: মহালছড়ি) is an upazila of Khagrachari District in the Division of Chittagong, Bangladesh.

== Geography ==
Mahalchari is located at 22.9194°N 92.0250°E. It has a total area of 186.48 km^{2}.

== Demographics ==
According to the 2022 Bangladeshi census, Mahalchhari Upazila had 11,572 households and a population of 49,077. 9.66% of the population were under 5 years of age. Mahalchhari had a literacy rate (age 7 and over) of 71.20%: 76.63% for males and 65.73% for females, and a sex ratio of 101.36 males for every 100 females. 17,183 (35.01%) lived in urban areas.

=== Ethnicity and religion ===
Religions in Mahalchhari Upazila (2022)
Religion	Percent
Buddhism	61.67%
Islam	30.94%
Hinduism	6.93%
Christianity	0.41%
Other or not stated	0.05%

Population by religion in Union
Union	Muslim	Buddhist	Hindu	Others
Kayangghat	1,348	7,452	7	145
Mohalchhari	7,299	9,171	2,095	33
Maischhari	6,537	5,961	1,289	41
Mubachhari	2	7,682	11	3

🟩 Muslim majority 🟨 Buddhist majority

As of the 2022 Bangladeshi census, the residual Mahalchhari upazila had a population of 49,077. The ethnic population was 30,944 (63.05%), of which Chakma were 21,357, Marma 7,487 and Tripura 1,948.

Ethnicity in Mahalchhari (2022)
1. Chakma (43.5%)
2. Bengali (37.0%)
3. Marma (15.3%)
4. Tripura (3.97%)
5. Others (0.30%)

Population by ethnicity in Union
Union	Bengali	Chakma	Tripura	Marma	Others
Kayangghat	1,708	7,225	3	12	4
Mohalchhari	9,411	5,483	759	2,853	92
Maischhari	6,946	3,267	1,172	2,400	43
Mubachhari	67	5,382	14	2,222	13

🟩 Bengali majority 🟨 Chakma majority

== Administration ==
Mahalchari Upazila is divided into four union parishads: Kayangghat, Mohalchhari, Maischhari and Mubachhari. The union parishads are subdivided into 13 mauzas and 196 villages.

Upazila Nirbahi Officer (UNO): Parveen Khanam

Upazila Chairman: Bimal Kanti Chakma

== Education ==
Schools

- APBn Ideal School and College
- Mohalchari Government High School
- Mohalchari Girls High School

College

- Mohalchari Government College

== See also ==
- Upazilas of Bangladesh
- Districts of Bangladesh
- Divisions of Bangladesh
