= Dighinala Union =

Union of Khagrachhari District, Chittagong, Bangladesh

Dighinala দীঘিনালা
- Union
- Interactive map of Dighinala
- Country: Bangladesh
- Division: Chittagong Division
- District: Khagrachhari District
- Upazila: Dighinala Upazila

Area
  - Total: 44.03 km^{2} (17.00 sq mi)

Population (2022)
  - Total: 14,866
  - Density: 337.6/km^{2} (874.5/sq mi)
- Time zone: UTC+6 (BST)
- Postal code: 4410
- Website: dighialaup.khagrachhari.gov.bd

Dighinala Union is a union of Dighinala Upazila under Khagrachhari District.

== Demography ==
According to 2022 census, total population of the Union are 14,866. Among them, 395 are Muslim, 14,408 are Buddhist, 36 are Hindu and 27 are Christian.

Religion-2022
1. Buddhism (96.9%)
2. Islam (2.66%)
3. Hinduism (0.24%)
4. Christianity (0.18%)
5. Others (0.00%)

== Ethnicity ==
This Union is home to a variety of different ethnic groups. Among them, 455 are Bengali, 14,359 are Chakma and 52 are of others ethnic groups.

Ethnicity-2022
1. Chakma (96.6%)
2. Bengali (3.06%)
3. Others (0.35%)
