= Keokradong =

Mountain in Bangladesh

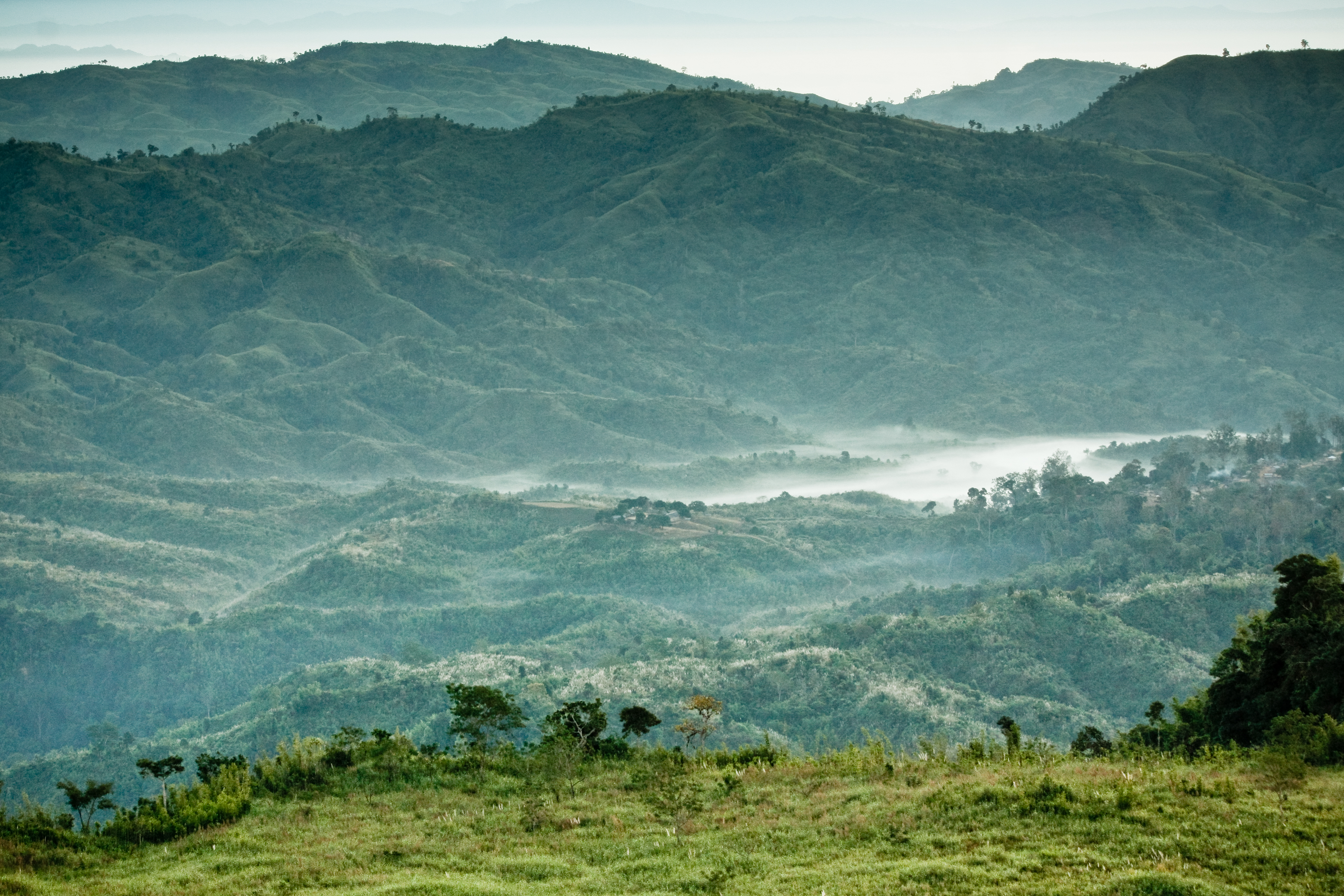
- Keokradong

Highest point
- Elevation: 986 m (3,235 ft)
- Prominence: 400 m (1,300 ft)
- Listing: List of mountains of Bangladesh
- Coordinates: 21°56′59″N 92°30′51″E

Geography
- Location within Bangladesh
- Location: Ruma Upazila, Bandarban

Geology
- Mountain type: Mountain

Keokradong (Bengali: কেওক্রাডং) is a peak located in Bandarban, Bangladesh, with an elevation of approximately 986 metres (3,235 ft).

On the top of Keokradong there is a small shelter and a signboard put up by Bangladesh Army proclaiming the elevation to be 967 metres (3,173 ft). Meanwhile, the height measured by handheld GPS shows it is 986 metres (3,235 ft) with 3m accuracy.

Keokradong is a popular tourist attraction in Bangladesh for mountaineers. Keokradong is one of the cloudiest places in Bangladesh.

Keokradong is sometimes incorrectly described as the highest point of Bangladesh, however the actual highest point is Saka Haphong.

== Gallery ==
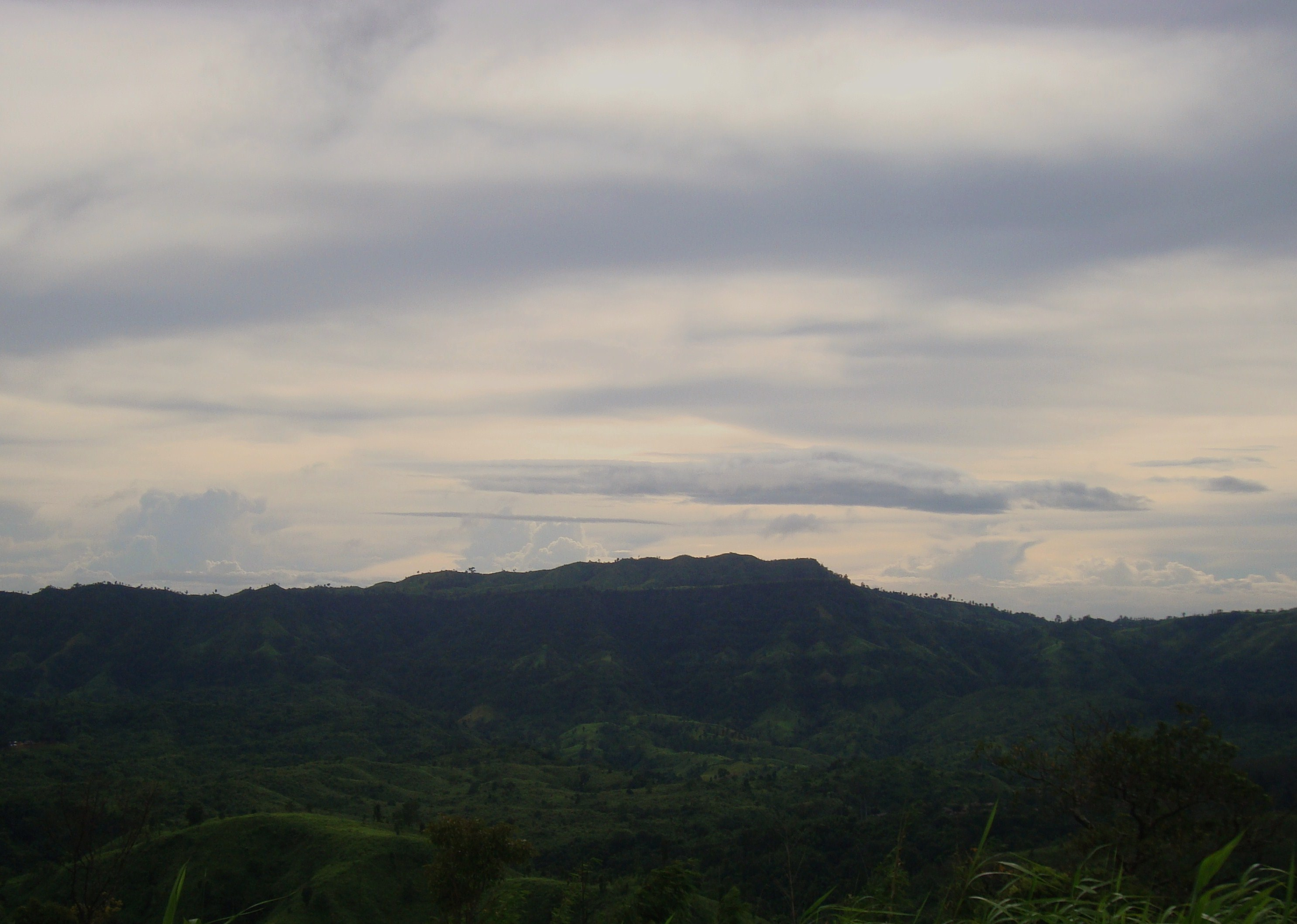
Eastern face of Keokradong

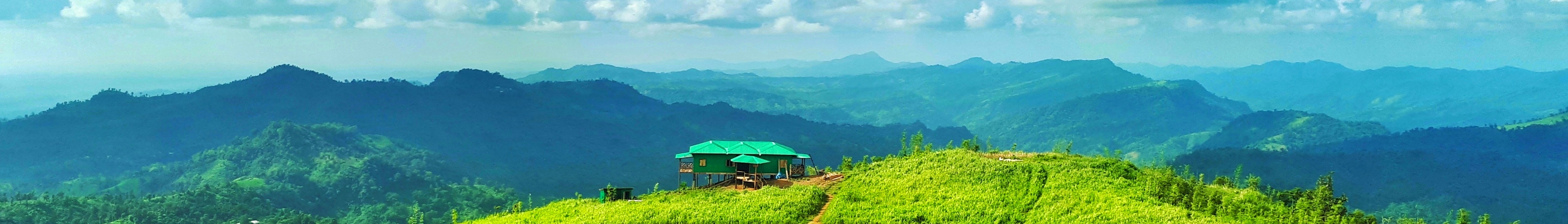
Panorama from the top of Keokradong.

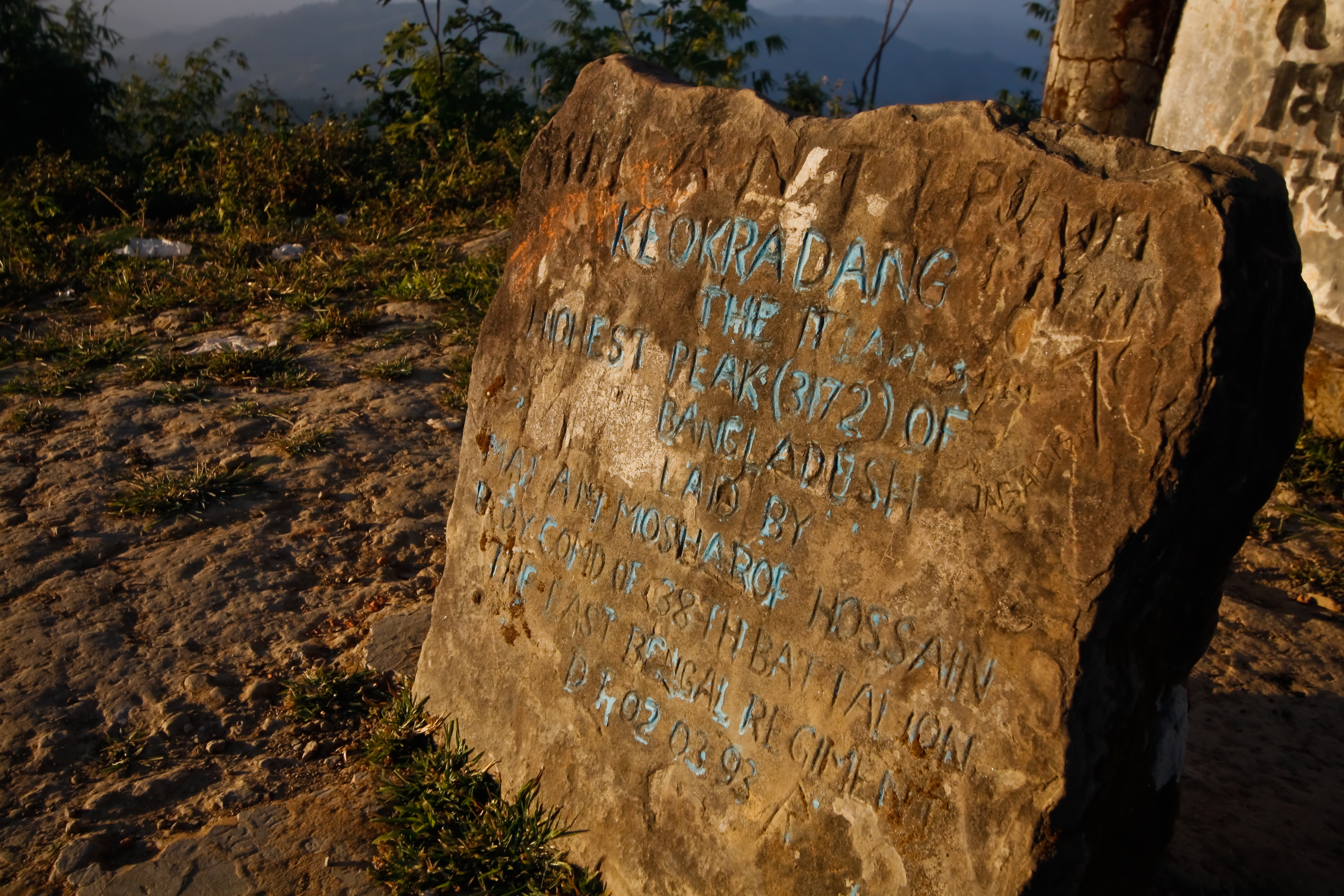
Keokradong Milestone

== See also ==
- Geography of Bangladesh
- List of mountains of Bangladesh
