= Devasish Roy =

Bangladeshi politician (born 1959)

Devasish Roy 𑄘𑄬𑄝𑄥𑄨𑄥𑄴 𑄢𑄧𑄠𑄴
- Raja

Chief of the Chakma Circle
- Tenure: 25 December 1977 – present
- Predecessor: Samit Roy
- Born: 9 April 1959 (age 67); Dacca, East Pakistan, Pakistan
- Consort: Tatu Roy (before 1998); Yan Yan (m. 2014)
- Issue: Tribhuvan Aryadev Roy
- Father: Tridev Roy
- Religion: Theravada Buddhism
- Occupation: Politician, lawyer

Devasish Roy (also spelled Debashish Roy; born 9 April 1959) is a Bangladeshi politician and lawyer. He is the titular Raja of the Chakma Circle, Bangladesh's largest indigenous community, and was a member of the United Nations Permanent Forum on Indigenous Issues from 2014 to 2016.

== Career ==
Born in a Chakma family, Roy is a bar at law by profession and served as a special assistant to the Chief Advisor of Bangladesh (head of the caretaker government of Bangladesh) during the 2006–2008 Bangladeshi political crisis. He was in charge of the Ministry of Chittagong Hill Tracts Affairs and the Ministry of Forest and Environment.

Roy became King of the Chakma Circle after his father Tridev Roy went into exile following the independence of Bangladesh from Pakistan in 1971. In the 1970 general election Raja Tridev Roy had been elected to the National Assembly of Pakistan as one of the only two non-Awami League candidates from East Pakistan. The former Raja who opposed the independence of Bangladesh fled Rangamati and escaped to Pakistan at the end of the Bangladesh Liberation War. However most of the royal family, including the Rani and Yuvraj, were still left at the Rangamati Palace. After the emergence of Bangladesh, Yuvraj Devasish Roy was proclaimed Raja due to the absence of his father.

== Personal life ==
Roy was married to Tatu Roy until her death in 1998. The couple have two children, a son, Tribhuvan Aryadev Roy, and a daughter. On 4 July 2014, he married Yan Yan, an ethnic Rakhine and had a son on April 16, 2015.
