= Boalkhali Union =

Union of Khagrachhari District, Chittagong, Bangladesh

Boalkhali বোয়ালখালী
- Union
- Interactive map of Boalkhali
- Country: Bangladesh
- Division: Chittagong Division
- District: Khagrachhari District
- Upazila: Dighinala Upazila

Area
  - Total: 31.08 km^{2} (12.00 sq mi)

Population (2022)
  - Total: 21,695
  - Density: 698.0/km^{2} (1,808/sq mi)
- Time zone: UTC+6 (BST)
- Postal code: 4410
- Website: boalkhaliup.khagrachhari.gov.bd

Boalkhali Union is a union of Dighinala Upazila under Khagrachhari District.

== Demography ==
According to 2022 census, total population of the Union are 21,695. Among them, 6,809 are Muslim, 9,271 are Buddhist, 5,473, are Hindu, 132 are Christian and 10 are follower of others religion.

Religion-2022
1. Buddhism (42.7%)
2. Islam (31.4%)
3. Hinduism (25.2%)
4. Christianity (0.61%)
5. Others (0.05%)

== Ethnicity ==
This Union is home to a variety of different ethnic groups. Among them, 9,220 are Bengali, 8,275 are Chakma, 4,066 are Tripura and 134 are of others ethnic groups.

Ethnicity-2022
1. Bengali (42.5%)
2. Chakma (38.1%)
3. Tripura (18.7%)
4. Others (0.62%)
