= Tribal monarchy in the Chittagong Hill Tracts =

Tribal chieftaincy

Tribal monarchy of the Chittagong Hill Tracts

Incumbent
- Devashish Roy (Chakma Circle); U Cha Prue (Bomang Circle); Saching Prue Chowdhury (Mong Circle) since 25 November 1977; 24 April 2013; 18 January 2009

Details
- Style: Raja
- Formed: 1860 (166 years ago)
- Appointer: Government of Bangladesh

The three districts of the Chittagong Hill Tracts, Bandarban, Rangamati and Khagrachari, have developed a tribal monarchy system. In 1860, the British government divided the Chittagong Hill Tracts into three circles–Chakma, Bomang and Mong. Bomang Circle is located in Bandarban, Chakma Circle in Rangamati and Mong Circle in Khagrachari. The monarchs of these three districts are known as three kings. For centuries, the people of the Chittagong Hill Tracts have been following the orders of the three kings. Currently, their activities are limited to issuing permanent resident certificates, tax collection, some social justice, arbitration meetings.

== Monarchs ==
According to the rules of the Chakma and Mong circles, the eldest son of the royal family is appointed as the king in the lineage, but in the Bomang circle, the eldest of the dynasty becomes the king. Current kings of the circles are:

- Chakma Circle: Barrister Devashish Roy (since 25 November 1977)
- Bomang Circle: U Cha Prue (since 24 April 2013)
- Mong Circle: Saching Prue Chowdhury (since 18 January 2009)

== Powers ==
There are 178 mouzas in Chakma Circle, 97 in Bomang Circle and 100 in Mong Circle. The headmen act as the head of each mouza. In each neighborhood there is a trader as a representative of the king. The king appoints headmen and traders. And the headmen and traders collect taxes as well as maintain law and order in the concerned areas. Every year during the winter, three kings organise Rajpunyah, when the tenants pay taxes for their land. A royal ceremony is organised on this occasion. In Bandarban, there is a fixed time for Rajpunyah every year. 42 percent of the tax collected in Rajpunyah is deposited in the treasury of the king, 37 percent in the treasury of the headman and 21 percent in the treasury of the government. However, in Rangamati and Khagrachari, Rajpunyah is not so prevalent.

Historically, the kings had significant powers during the British Raj. However, the rights of the kings were curtailed during the Pakistan period, and has been remained declining since independence of Bangladesh. At present the kings get only 5000 taka, the headmen get 500 taka and the traders get 300 taka honorarium from the Bangladesh government.
