= Lakshmichhari Upazila =

Lakshmichhari upazila লক্ষীছড়ি
- Upazila
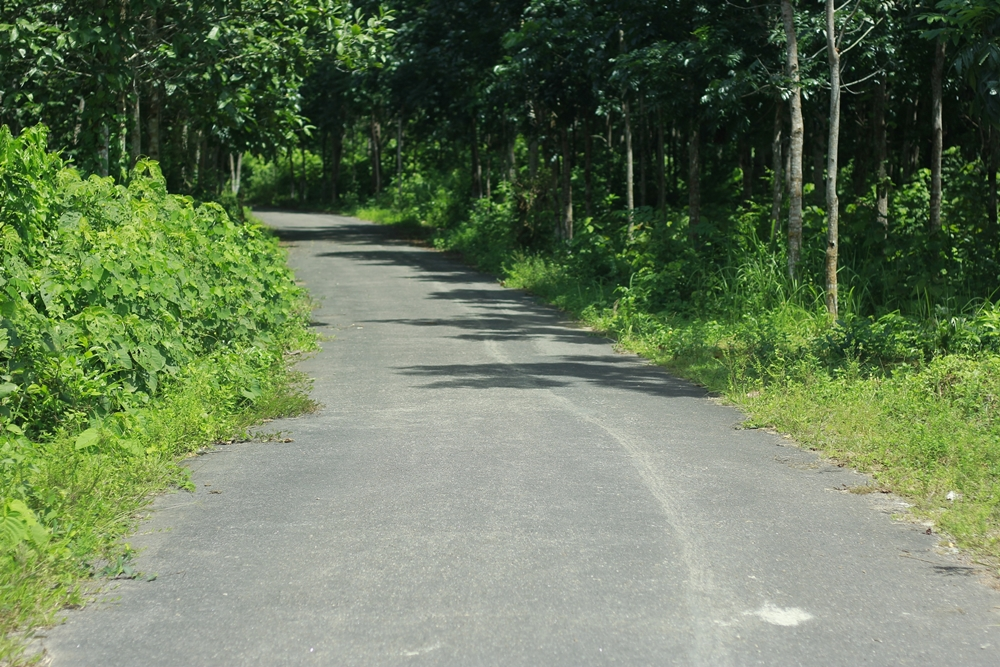
- A road in Lakshmichhari

- Coordinates: 22°47.4′N 91°54′E
- Country: Bangladesh
- Division: Chittagong
- District: Khagrachhari

Area
  - Total: 220.14 km^{2} (85.00 sq mi)

Population (2022)
  - Total: 27,148
  - Density: 123.32/km^{2} (319.40/sq mi)
- Time zone: UTC+6 (BST)
- Postal code: 4470
- Website: laxmichhari.khagrachhari.gov.bd(in Bengali)

Lakshmichhari Upazila mauza geocode map

Lakshmichhari (Bengali: লক্ষীছড়ি) is an upazila of Khagrachari District in the Division of Chittagong, Bangladesh.

== Geography ==
Lakshmichari is located at 22.7903°N 91.9000°E. It has total area 220.14 km^{2}.

== Demographics ==
According to the 2022 Bangladeshi census, Lakkhichhari Upazila had 6,509 households and a population of 27,148. 8.76% of the population were under 5 years of age. Lakkhichhari had a literacy rate (age 7 and over) of 62.59%: 70.89% for males and 54.03% for females, and a sex ratio of 103.97 males for every 100 females. 3,779 (13.92%) lived in urban areas.

=== Ethnicity and religion ===
Religions in Lakshmichhari Upazila (2022)
Religion	Percent
Buddhism	77.73%
Islam	20.07%
Hinduism	2.07%
Christianity	0.13%
Other or not stated	0.00%

Population by religion in Union
Union	Muslim	Buddhist	Others
Barmachhari	61	6,653	117
Dulyatali	1,532	5,989	33
Lakshmichhari	3,855	8,461	447

🟨 Buddhist majority

As of the 2022 Bangladeshi census, Lakshmichhari upazila had a population of 27,148. The ethnic population was 20,156 (74.24%), of which Chakma were 13,936 and Marma 5,924.

Ethnicity in Lakshmichhari (2022)
1. Chakma (51.3%)
2. Bengali (25.8%)
3. Marma (21.8%)
4. Others (1.09%)

Population by ethnicity in Union
Union	Bengali	Chakma	Marma	Others
Barmachhari	75	4,704	1,943	109
Dulyatali	2,326	3,275	1,943	10
Lakshmichhari	4,591	5,957	2,038	177

🟨 Chakma majority

== Administration ==
UNO: Sultana Razia.

Lakshmichari Upazila is divided into three union parishads: Barmachhari, Dulyatali and Lakshmichhari. The union parishads are subdivided into 16 mauzas and 134 villages.

== See also ==
- Upazilas of Bangladesh
- Districts of Bangladesh
- Divisions of Bangladesh
- Thanas of Bangladesh
- Union councils of Bangladesh
