= Dighinala Upazila =

Dighinala দীঘিনালা
- Upazila
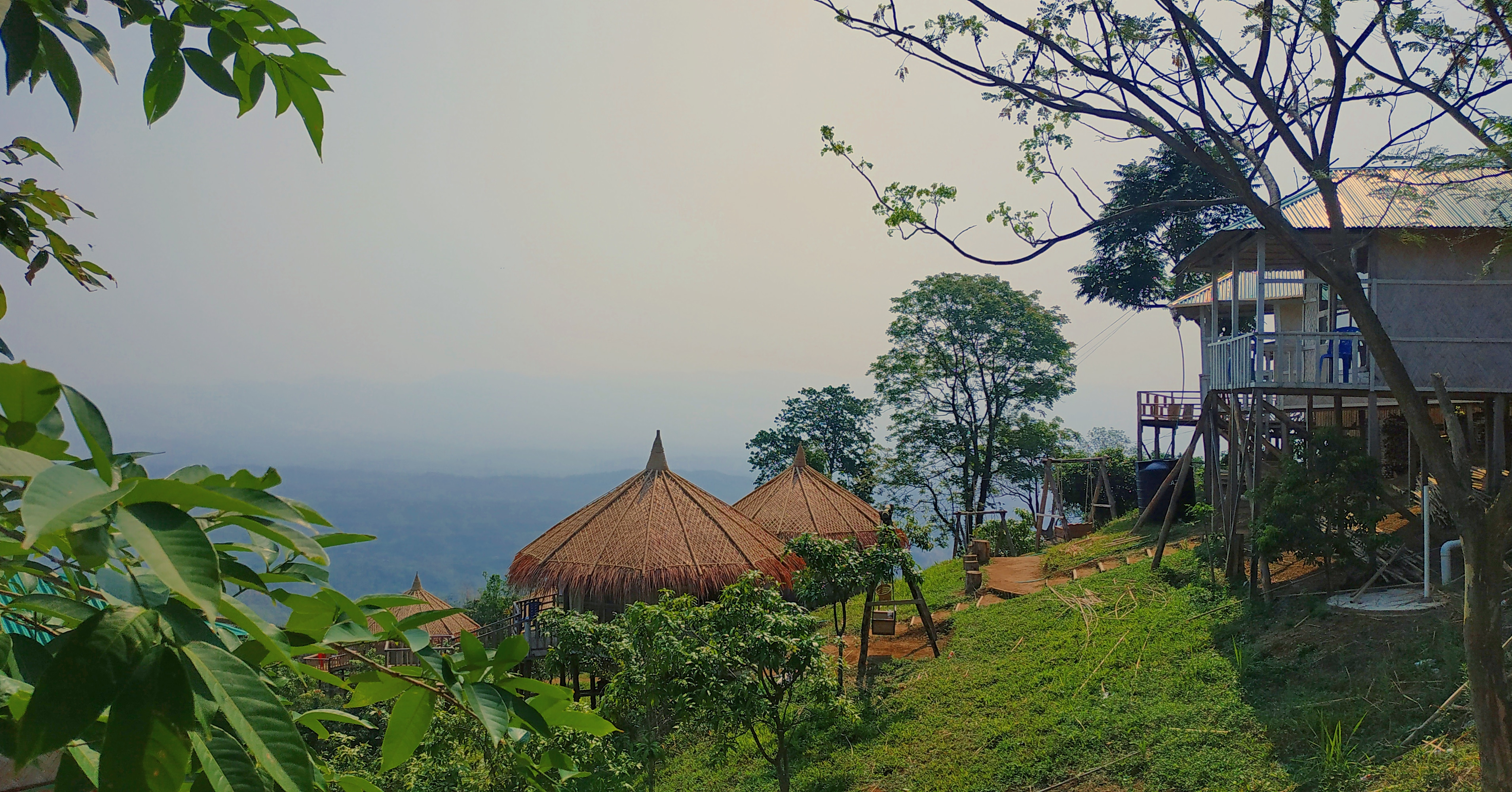
- Sajek Valley, Dighinala, Khagrachhari

- Coordinates: 23°15.5′N 92°3.5′E
- Country: Bangladesh
- Division: Chittagong
- District: Khagrachhari

Government
  - Chairman: Vacant

Area
  - Total: 694.11 km^{2} (268.00 sq mi)

Population (2022)
  - Total: 115,440
  - Density: 166.31/km^{2} (430.75/sq mi)
- Time zone: UTC+6 (BST)
- Postal code: 4420
- Website: www.dighinala.khagrachhari.gov.bd

Dighinala Upazila mauza geocode map

Dighinala (Bengali: দীঘিনালা) is an upazila of Khagrachari District in the Division of Chittagong, Bangladesh.

== History ==
Dighinala, the biggest upazila of Khagrachhari zila in respect of area, came into existence in 1916 as a thana and was upgraded to upazila in 1984. It is said that in the long past, Tripura Maharaja Govinda Manikya Bahadur Debbarma dug a big pond (meaning Dighi in Bangla) by the side of a canal (meaning Nala in Bangla). This upazila was under Tripura Kingdom used to be known as "Reangdesh"

It is generally believed that the upazila might have originated its name from above two words Dighi and Nala.

== Geography ==
Dighinala Upazila (Khagrachhari district) area 694.11 km^{2}, located in between 23°04' and 23°44' north latitudes and in between 91°56' and 92°11' east longitudes. It is a hilly area. It is bounded by tripura state of India on the north, langadu upazila on the south, Baghaichhari upazila on the east, Panchhari and Khagrachhari Sadar upazilas and Tripura state on the west. Golamoon, Karmi Mura, Lutiban, Kuradia hills are notable.

== Demographics ==
According to the 2022 Bangladeshi census, Dighinala Upazila had 28,028 households and a population of 115,440. 9.31% of the population were under 5 years of age. Dighinala had a literacy rate (age 7 and over) of 69.94%: 76.69% for males and 62.93% for females, and a sex ratio of 103.67 males for every 100 females. 28,856 (25.00%) lived in urban areas.

=== Ethnicity and religion ===
Religions in Dighinala Upazila (2022)
Religion	Percent
Buddhism	54.54%
Islam	35.70%
Hinduism	9.41%
Other or not stated	0.35%

Population by religion in Union
Union	Muslim	Buddhist	Hindu	Others
Babuchhara	1,786	13,024	547	69
Boalkhali	6,809	9,271	5,473	142
Dighinala	395	14,408	36	27
Kabakhali	9,112	8,706	50	69
Merung	23,111	17,551	4,761	99

🟩 Muslim majority 🟨 Buddhist majority

The ethnic population was 70,420 (61.00%), of which Chakma were 61,618 and Tripura 8,523.

Ethnicity in Dighinala (2022)
1. Chakma (53.4%)
2. Bengali (39.0%)
3. Tripura (7.38%)
4. Others (0.24%)

Population by ethnicity in Union
Union	Bengali	Chakma	Tripura	Others
Babuchhara	2,074	12,927	336	79
Boalkhali	9,220	8,275	4,066	134
Dighinala	455	14,359	20	32
Kabakhali	9,185	8,717	26	9
Merung	24,082	17,340	4,075	25

🟩 Bengali majority 🟨 Chakma majority

== Administration ==
UNO: Md. Mamunur Rashid.

Dighinala Upazila is divided into five union parishads: Babuchhara, Boalkhali, Dighinala, Kabakhali and Merung. The union parishads are subdivided into 20 mauzas and 245 villages.

== Economy ==
Main sources of income Agriculture 65.53%, non-agricultural labourer 8.51%, commerce 9.70%, service 5.01%, construction 0.42%, religious service 0.20%, rent and remittance 0.10% and others 10.53%.

Ownership of agricultural land Landowner 46.96%, landless 53.04%; agricultural landowner: urban 25.85% and rural 50.57%.

== Education ==
Literacy rate and educational institutions Average literacy 47.5%; male 56.1%, female 38%. Educational institutions: Choto Merung High School, DIGHINALA BORADOM HIGH SCHOOL, Dighinala Government College, Dighinala Government High School, Dighinala Model Girls' School, Hashinpur High School, Anath Ashram Abashik High School, Babuchhara High School, Udal Bagan High School, Rasik Nagar Dakhil Madrasa.Trabonia high school

== Transport ==
Communication facilities Pucca road 91 km, semi-pucca road 34 km, mud road 280 km.

Extinct or nearly extinct traditional transport Bullock cart. Connected to the zila headquarters by metalled roads. Bus, minibus, three wheelers ply over the upazila. Chander Gari (local four wheeled jeep) is a popular transport used to ply in the hill area of upazila.

== Points of interest ==
- Sajek
- 10 No. Jhorna
- Suspension Bridge
- The Dhigi

== See also ==
- Upazilas of Bangladesh
- Districts of Bangladesh
- Divisions of Bangladesh
