= List of protected areas of Bangladesh =

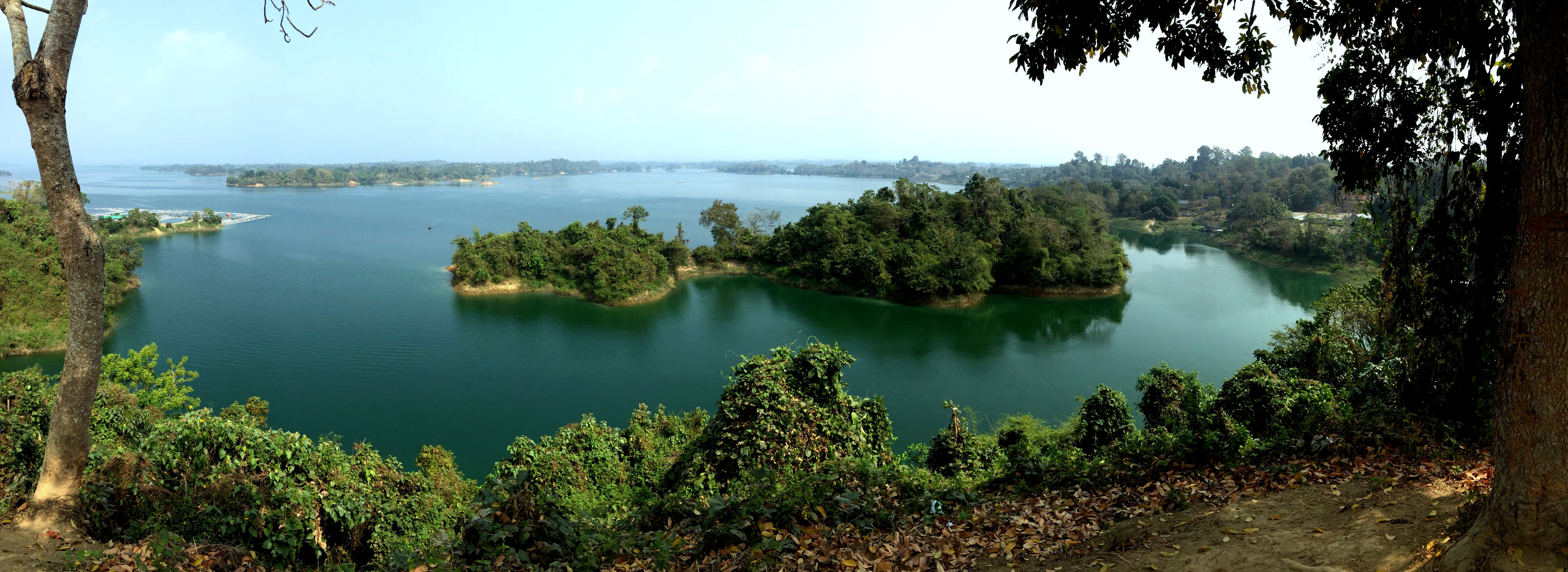
A view of Kaptai National Park

This is a list of protected areas of Bangladesh. Bangladesh is a country in South Asia. There are 60 Protected Areas contains about 818247.46 hectares (Terrestrial & Marine). Out of this, Terrestrial Protected Areas contains 470147.46 hectares which represents 3.19% area of the country. Protected areas include:

- 19 Wildlife Sanctuaries and 6 Dolphin Sanctuaries
- 19 National Parks
- 10 Eco Parks
- 5 Marine Protected Areas
- 1 Marine Reserve
- 1 Special Biodiversity Conservation Area and 1 Water Based Special Biodiversity Conservation Area
- 2 Botanical Gardens
- 1 Aviary Park
- 2 Ramsar sites
- 1 Natural World Heritage Site

== National Park ==
Name	Image	Location	Area (Hector)	Declaration	IUCN Category
Bhawal National Park		24°5′45″N 90°24′14″E Gazipur District, Dhaka Division	5022.29	11 May 1982	IV; Habitat or species management area
Madhupur National Park		24°41′54″N 90°07′10″E Madhupur Upazila, Tangail, Dhaka Division	8436.13	4 February 1982	IV; Habitat or species management area
Ramsagar National Park		25°33′16″N 88°37′26″E Dinajpur, Rangpur Division	27.75	30 April 2001	IV; Habitat or species management area
Himchari National Park		21°20′58″N 92°02′24″E Cox's Bazar, Chittagong Division	1729.21	15 February 1980	IV; Habitat or species management area
Lawachara National Park		24°19′11″N 91°47′1″E Moulvibazar, Sylhet Division	1250	7 July 1996	II; National Park
Kaptai National Park		22°30′08″N 92°12′04″E Rangamati, Chittagong Division	5464.78	9 September 1999	II; National Park
Nijhum Dwip National Park		22°04′22″N 90°59′54″E Hatiya, Noakhali, Chittagong Division	16352.23	8 April 2001	II; National Park
Medhakachhapia National Park		21°41′15.56″N 92°9′21.66″E Cox's Bazar, Chittagong Division	395.92	4 April 2004	IV; Habitat or species management area
Satchari National Park		24°07′12″N 91°27′03″E Habiganj, Sylhet Division	242.91	10 October 2005	II; National Park
Khadim Nagar National Park		24°53′52″N 91°52′17″E Sylhet, Sylhet Division	678.8	13 April 2006	IV; Habitat or species management area
Baroiyadhala National Park		22°39′16″N 91°40′06″E Chittagong, Chittagong Division	2933.61	6 April 2010	II; National Park
Kuakata National Park		21°51′14″N 90°05′27″E Kalapara, Patuakhali, Barisal Division	1613	24 October 2010	II; National Park
Nawabganj National Park		25°27′06″N 89°03′13″E Nawabganj, Dinajpur, Rangpur Division	517.61	24 October 2010	IV; Habitat or species management area
Singra National Park		25°53′24″N 88°33′47″E Dinajpur, Rangpur Division	305.69	4 October 2010	IV; Habitat or species management area
Kadigarh National Park		24°20′18″N 90°19′42″E Kachina, Bhaluka, Mymensingh, Mymensingh Division	344.13	24 October 2010	IV; Habitat or species management area
Altadighi National Park		25°11′11″N 88°51′58″E Dhamoirhat, Naogaon, Rajshahi Division	264.12	14 December 2011	IV; Habitat or species management area
Birganj National Park		25°50′57″N 88°39′45″E Birganj, Dinajpur, Rangpur Division	168.56	14 December 2011	IV; Habitat or species management area
Sheikh Jamal Inani National Park		21°08′24″N 92°04′56″E Ukhia, Cox's Bazar, Chittagong Division	7085.16	15 April 2019	
Dharmapur National Park		25°32′23″N 88°32′52″E Biral, Dinajpur, Rangpur Division	704.7	24 November 2021	

== Wildlife Sanctuary ==
Name	Image	Location	Area (ha)	Year of establishment	Year of declaration	IUCN category
Rema-Kalenga Wildlife Sanctuary		Chunarughat, Habiganj, Sylhet	1795.54	7 July 1996	7 July 1996	II National Park
Char Kukri-Mukri Wildlife Sanctuary		Char Fasson, Bhola, Barisal	40	19 December 1981	19 December 1981	IV Habitat or species management area
Sundarbans East Wildlife Sanctuary		Bagerhat, Khulna	122920.90	6 April 1996	29 June 2017	Ib Wilderness area
Sundarbans West Wildlife Sanctuary		Satkhira, Khulna	119718.88	6 April 1996	29 June 2017	Ib Wilderness area
Sundarbans South Wildlife Sanctuary		Khulna District, Khulna	75310.30	6 April 1996	29 June 2017	Ib Wilderness area
Pablakhali Wildlife Sanctuary		Chittagong Hill Tracts	42069.37	20 September 1983	20 September 1983	II National Park
Chunati Wildlife Sanctuary		Chittagong District	7763.97	18 March 1986	18 March 1986	IV Habitat or species management area
Fasiakhali Wildlife Sanctuary		Chakaria, Cox's Bazar, Chittagong	1302.42	11 April 2007	11 April 2007	IV Habitat or species management area
Dudpukuria-Dhopachari Wildlife Sanctuary		Chittagong District	4716.57	6 April 2010	6 April 2010	IV Habitat or species management area
Hazarikhil Wildlife Sanctuary		Fatikchhari, Chittagong	1177.53	6 April 2010	6 April 2010	II National Park
Sangu Wildlife Sanctuary		Bandarban, Chittagong	2331.98	6 April 2010	6 April 2010	II National Park
Teknaf Wildlife Sanctuary		Teknaf, Cox's Bazar, Chittagong	11614.57	24 March 2010	9 December 2009	IV Habitat or species management area
Tengragiri Wildlife Sanctuary		Barguna, Barisal	4048.58	24 October 2010	24 October 2010	II National Park
Dudhmukhi Wildlife Sanctuary		Bagerhat District, Khulna	170	29 January 2012	29 January 2012	II National Park
Chadpai Wildlife Sanctuary		Bagerhat District, Khulna	560	29 January 2012	29 January 2012	II National Park
Dhangmari Wildlife Sanctuary		Bagerhat District, Khulna	340	29 January 2012	29 January 2012	II National Park
Sonarchar Wildlife Sanctuary		Patuakhali District, Barisal	2026.48	24 December 2011	24 December 2011	II National Park
Padma Bridge Wildlife Sanctuary		Madaripur, Shariatpur, Munshiganj, Faridpur	11772.608	26 November 2020	26 November 2020	
Baishari Bangdepa Wildlife Sanctuary		Cox's Bazar	2233.055	16 April 2023	16 April 2023	

The 1990 edition of the IUCN Directory of South Asian Protected Areas says the Forest Department also established a center for the protection of waterfowl at Hail Haor Wildlife Sanctuary.

=== Dolphin Sanctuary ===
Name	Image	Location	Area (ha)	Year of establishment	Year of declaration	IUCN category
Nazirganj Dolphin Sanctuary		Pabna District, Rajshahi	146	1 December 2013	1 December 2013	VI Protected area with sustainable use of natural resources
Shilanda-Nagdemra Dolphin Sanctuary		Pabna District, Rajshahi	24.17	1 December 2013	1 December 2013	VI Protected area with sustainable use of natural resources
Nagarbari-Mohanganj Dolphin Sanctuary		Pabna District, Rajshahi	408.11	1 December 2013	1 December 2013	VI Protected area with sustainable use of natural resources
Pankhali Dolphin Sanctuary		Khulna	404	4 March 2020	4 March 2020	
Shibsha Dolphin Sanctuary		Khulna	2155	4 March 2020	4 March 2020	
Vadra Dolphin Sanctuary		Khulna	868	4 March 2020	4 March 2020	

== Special Biodiversity Conservation Area ==
Name	Image	Location	Area (Hector)	Declaration
Special Biodiversity Conservation Area (Ratargul)		25°01′03″N 91°55′54″E Sylhet, Sylhet Division	204.25	31 May 2015
Altadighi water based Special Biodiversity Conservation Area		25°11′11″N 88°51′58″E Dhamoirhat, Naogaon, Rajshahi Division	17.33	9 June 2016

== Marine Protected Area ==
Name	Image	Location	Area (Hector)	Declaration
Swatch of No Ground Marine Protected Area		Swatch of No Ground	173800	27 October 2014
Saint Martin Marine Protected Area		St. Martin's Island	174300	4 January 2022
Marine Protected Area (Bangladesh)		Middle Ground and South Patches of Bay of Bengal	69800	29 October 2000
Nijhum Dwip Marine Protected Area		Nijhum Dwip	318800	23 June 2019
Naf Marine Protected Area		Basin of Naf River	73417	21 May 2024

== Vulture Safe Zone ==
Vulture Safe Zone - 1

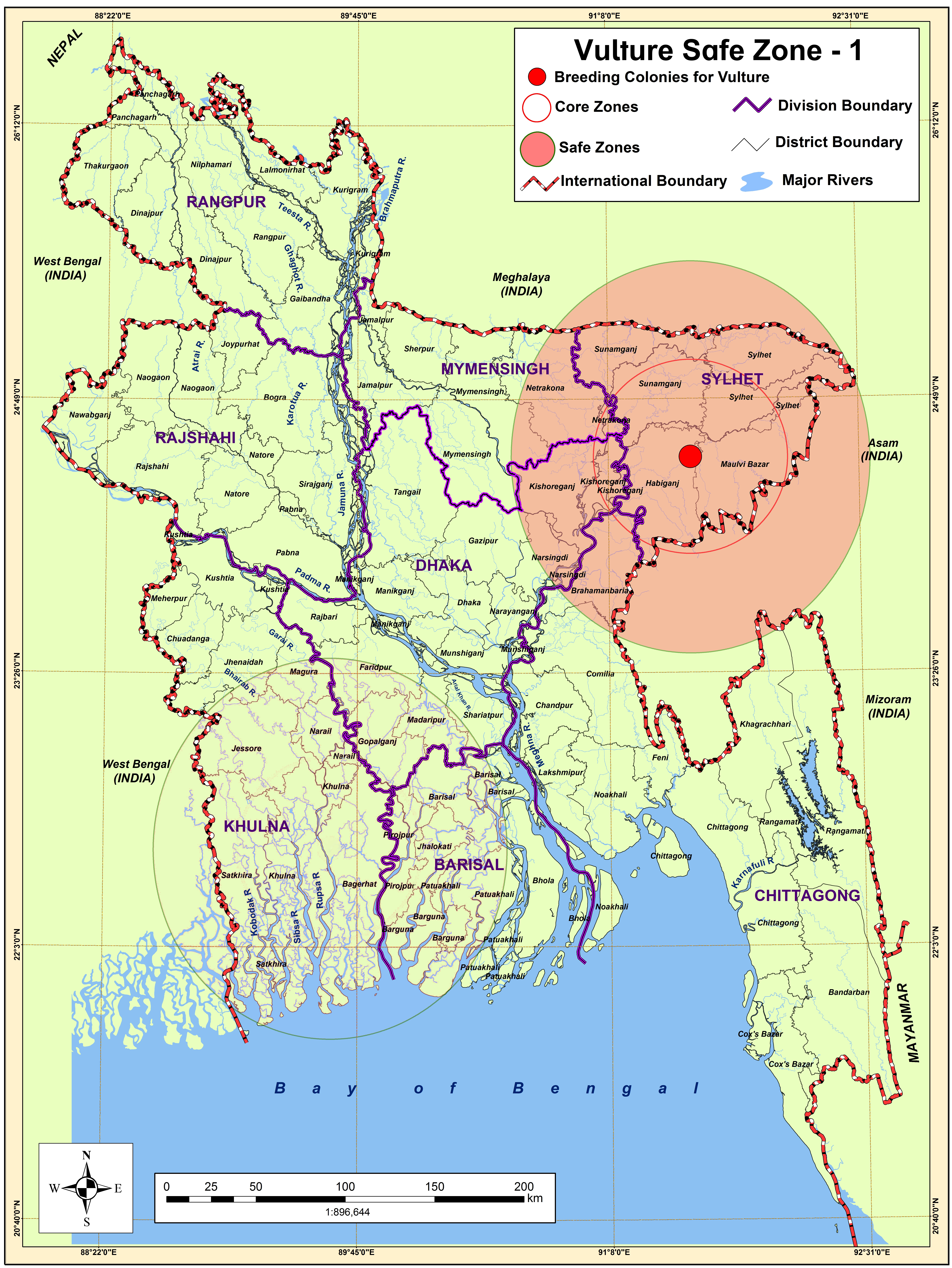

The safe areas of vulture under Sylhet, Dhaka (partial) and Chittagong Division

- Districts: Sylhet, Habiganj, Sunamganj, Moulvibazar, Netrokona, Kishoreganj, Gazipur, Mymensingh, Brahmanbaria, Narsingdi, Comilla and Khagrachari
- Total area of Bangladeshi part: 19,663.18 square kilometers
- Core area of Bangladesh part: 7,459.182 square kilometers
- Important areas or hotspots for vultures:
  - Vulture Reproduction and resting place:
    - Rema-Kalenga Wildlife Sanctuary (Habiganj)
    - Deorachhara and Kalachhara, Madhabpur, Karimpur (Moulvibazar)
    - Nabiganj (Habiganj)
- Government declared protected area within the safe area identified for vultures: 4,603.98 hectares
  - National Parks:
    - Lawachara National Park
    - Satchari National Park
  - Wildlife Sanctuaries:
    - Rema-Kalenga Wildlife Sanctuary
  - Eco-Park:
    - Madhabkunda Ecopark
    - Tilagor Eco Park
    - Borshijora Ecopark

Vulture Safe Zone - 2

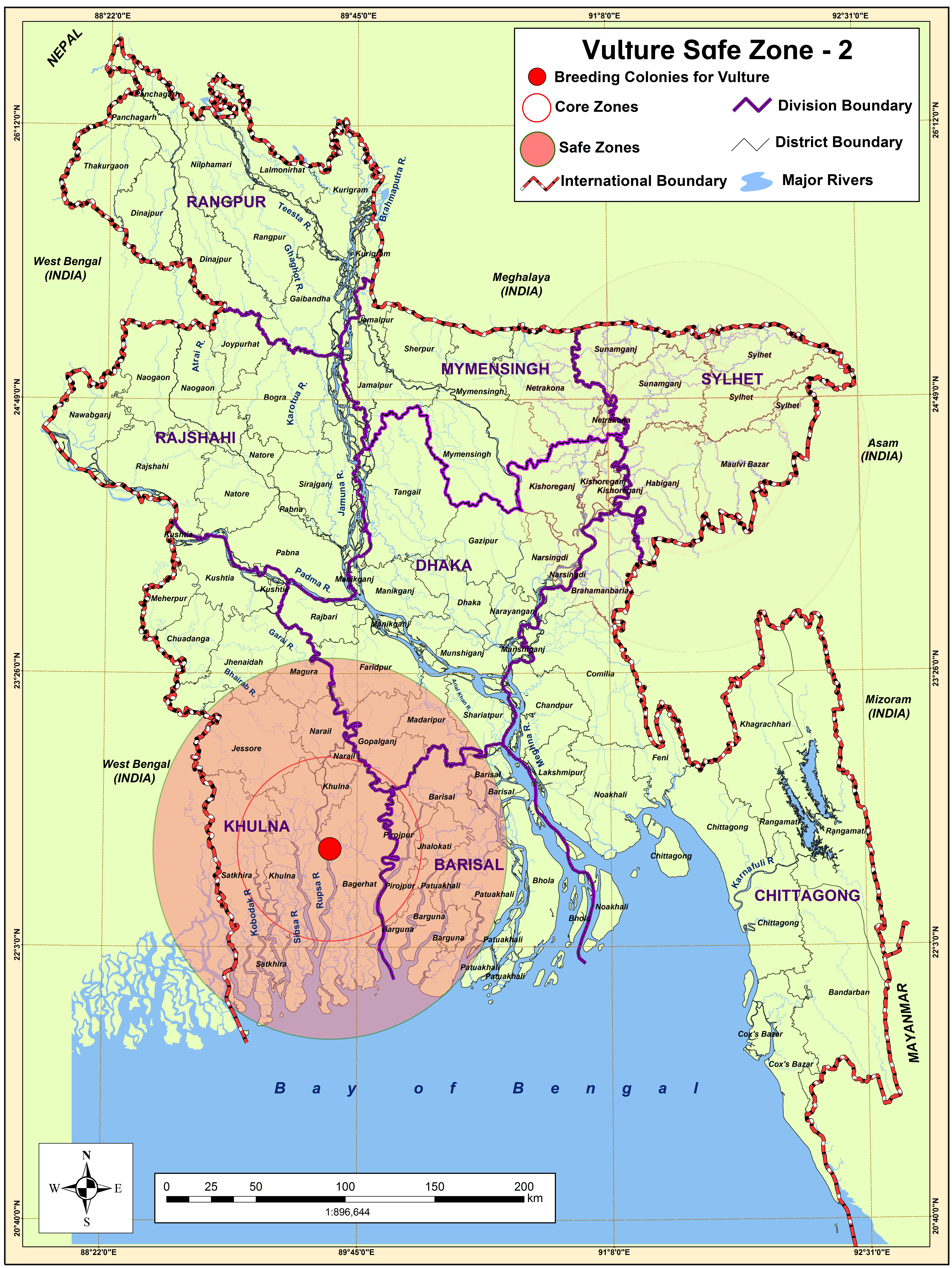

The safe areas of vultures under Khulna, Barisal and Dhaka (partial) division.

- Districts: Faridpur, Magura, Jhenaidah, Madaripur, Jashore, Gopalganj (excluding Tungipara), Narail, Shariatpur, Barisal, Bagerhat, Khulna, Satkhira, Pirojpur (excluding Bhandaria), Jhalakati, Patuakhali and Barguna
- Total area of Bangladeshi part: 27717.26 square kilometers
- Core area of Bangladesh part: 7846.258 square kilometers
- Important areas or hotspots for vultures:
  - Vulture Reproduction and resting place:
    - Batiaghata (Khulna)
    - Loudob (Dakop, Khulna)
    - Dumuria (Khulna)
- Government declared protected area within the safe area identified for vultures: 148457.56 hectares
  - National Parks:
    - Kuakata National Park
  - Wildlife Sanctuaries:
    - Sundarbans East Wildlife Sanctuary
    - Sundarbans West Wildlife Sanctuary
    - Sundarbans South Wildlife Sanctuary
    - Sonarchar Wildlife Sanctuary
    - Tengragiri Wildlife Sanctuary
    - Chadpai Wildlife Sanctuary
    - Dudhmukhi Wildlife Sanctuary
    - Dhangmari Wildlife Sanctuary

== Botanical Garden ==
Name	Image	Location	Area (Hector)	Declaration
National Botanical Garden		23°49′00″N 90°20′55″E Mirpur, Dhaka, Dhaka Division	87.13	1981
Baldha Garden		23°43′06″N 90°25′04″E Wari, Dhaka, Dhaka Division	1.37	1909

== Safari Park ==
Name	Image	Location	Area (Hector)	Declaration
Gazipur Safari Park		24°10′18″N 90°23′34″E Gazipur District, Dhaka Division	1493.93	2013
Dulhazra Safari Park		21°39′45″N 92°50′0″E Chakaria, Cox's Bazar, Chittagong Division	600	1999

== Eco Park ==
Name	Image	Location	Area (Hector)	Declaration
Madhabkunda Ecopark		24°37′47″N 92°13′16″E Dakshinvag, Barlekha, Moulvibazar, Sylhet Division	202.43	2001
Tilagor Eco Park		24°55′02″N 91°54′24″E Sylhet, Sylhet Division	45.34	2006
Charmuguria Eco-Park		23°10′28″N 90°12′24″E Nachar, Kumarakhali, Madaripur Sadar, Madaripur, Dhaka Division	4.20	2015
Madhutila Eco Park		25°12′21″N 90°09′12″E Nalitabari, Sherpur, Mymensingh Division	131.19	May 18, 2023
Sitakunda Botanical Garden and Ecopark		22°36′06″N 91°40′17″E Muradpur, Sitakund, Chittagong division,	808.00	1998
Banshkhali Ecopark		21°59′23″N 91°58′55″E Banshkhali, Chittagong Division,	1200.00	2003
Kuakata Ecopark		21°48′44″N 90°08′15″E Kalapara, Patuakhali, Barisal Division	5661.00	2005
Borshijora Ecopark		24°28′08″N 91°47′05″E Moulvibazar, Sylhet Division	326.07	2006
Jamuna Bridge West Bank Eco-Park		24°24′00″N 89°44′49″E Sayedabad, Sirajganj, Rajshahi Division	50.02	2008
Pirojpur Riverview Ecopark		22°33′30″N 89°57′30″E Namazpur, Pirojpur, Barisal division	2.54	2010

== Aviary Park ==
Name	Image	Location	Area (Hector)	Declaration
Sheikh Russel Aviary and Eco-Park		22°29′37″N 92°07′16″E South Nishintapur, Hosnabad, Rangunia, Chittagong Division	210	24 November 2021

== World Heritage Site (Natural) ==
- Sundarbans | Satkhira, Khulna and Bagerhat
