= List of wildlife sanctuaries of Bangladesh =

Wildlife sanctuaries in Bangladesh

This is a list of wildlife sanctuaries in Bangladesh. Between 1981 and 2017, 20 wildlife sanctuaries were established in the country that cover 271,057.16 ha (2,710.5716 km^{2}) as of 2020. Among them, three wildlife sanctuaries are located at Sundarbans, the World Heritage Site.

== List ==
Name	Image	Location	Area (ha)	Year of establishment	Year of declaration	IUCN category
Rema-Kalenga Wildlife Sanctuary		Chunarughat, Habiganj, Sylhet	1795.54	7 July 1996	7 July 1996	II National Park
Char Kukri-Mukri Wildlife Sanctuary		Char Fasson, Bhola, Barisal	40	19 December 1981	19 December 1981	IV Habitat or species management area
Sundarbans East Wildlife Sanctuary		Bagerhat, Khulna	122920.90	6 April 1996	29 June 2017	Ib Wilderness area
Sundarbans West Wildlife Sanctuary		Satkhira, Khulna	119718.88	6 April 1996	29 June 2017	Ib Wilderness area
Sundarbans South Wildlife Sanctuary		Khulna District, Khulna	75310.30	6 April 1996	29 June 2017	Ib Wilderness area
Pablakhali Wildlife Sanctuary		Chittagong Hill Tracts	42069.37	20 September 1983	20 September 1983	II National Park
Chunati Wildlife Sanctuary		Chittagong District	7763.97	18 March 1986	18 March 1986	IV Habitat or species management area
Fasiakhali Wildlife Sanctuary		Chakaria, Cox's Bazar, Chittagong	1302.42	11 April 2007	11 April 2007	IV Habitat or species management area
Dudpukuria-Dhopachari Wildlife Sanctuary		Chittagong District	4716.57	6 April 2010	6 April 2010	IV Habitat or species management area
Hazarikhil Wildlife Sanctuary		Fatikchhari, Chittagong	1177.53	6 April 2010	6 April 2010	II National Park
Sangu Wildlife Sanctuary		Bandarban, Chittagong	2331.98	6 April 2010	6 April 2010	II National Park
Teknaf Wildlife Sanctuary		Teknaf, Cox's Bazar, Chittagong	11614.57	24 March 2010	9 December 2009	IV Habitat or species management area
Tengragiri Wildlife Sanctuary		Barguna, Barisal	4048.58	24 October 2010	24 October 2010	II National Park
Dudhmukhi Wildlife Sanctuary		Bagerhat District, Khulna	170	29 January 2012	29 January 2012	II National Park
Chadpai Wildlife Sanctuary		Bagerhat District, Khulna	560	29 January 2012	29 January 2012	II National Park
Dhangmari Wildlife Sanctuary		Bagerhat District, Khulna	340	29 January 2012	29 January 2012	II National Park
Sonarchar Wildlife Sanctuary		Patuakhali District, Barisal	2026.48	24 December 2011	24 December 2011	II National Park
Padma Bridge Wildlife Sanctuary		Madaripur, Shariatpur, Munshiganj, Faridpur	11772.608	26 November 2020	26 November 2020	
Baishari Bangdepa Wildlife Sanctuary		Cox's Bazar	2233.055	16 April 2023	16 April 2023	

== Dolphin Sanctuary ==
Name	Image	Location	Area (ha)	Year of establishment	Year of declaration	IUCN category
Nazirganj Dolphin Sanctuary		Pabna District, Rajshahi	146	1 December 2013	1 December 2013	VI Protected area with sustainable use of natural resources
Shilanda-Nagdemra Dolphin Sanctuary		Pabna District, Rajshahi	24.17	1 December 2013	1 December 2013	VI Protected area with sustainable use of natural resources
Nagarbari-Mohanganj Dolphin Sanctuary		Pabna District, Rajshahi	408.11	1 December 2013	1 December 2013	VI Protected area with sustainable use of natural resources
Pankhali Dolphin Sanctuary		Khulna	404	4 March 2020	4 March 2020	
Shibsha Dolphin Sanctuary		Khulna	2155	4 March 2020	4 March 2020	
Vadra Dolphin Sanctuary		Khulna	868	4 March 2020	4 March 2020	

== See also ==
- List of protected areas of Bangladesh
