= Kassalong reserve forest =

Wildlife sanctuary in Bangladesh

- IUCN category II (national park)
- Location within Chittagong division
- Location: Rangamati District, Chittagong Division, Bangladesh
- Nearest city: Rangamati
- Coordinates: 23°08′43.8″N 92°18′01.52″E
- Area: 148,500 ha (367,000 acres)
- Elevation: 170 m (560 ft)
- Established: 1881
- Governing body: Bangladesh Forest Department

Kassalang reserve forest (also spelt as Kachalong, Bengali: কাসালাং সংরক্ষিত বন, Chakma: 𑄇𑄥𑄣𑄕𑄉 𑄝𑄋) is an evergreen mountainous forest in Bangladesh. It covers an area of 1,485 square kilometres (573 sq mi). It is a protected area in Bangladesh. Kassalang reserve forest is one of the largest and dense forest in Bangladesh. The area of Kassalang is situated far away from human settlements that make it special for nature lovers. It houses Bangladesh's richest wildlife resource after Sundarbans and Sangu Matamuhari. It is under the Baghaichari. Forest Division of the Forest Department (Bangladesh). It is a 9a bio-ecological zone in Chittagong Hill Tracts.

== History ==
The word Kassalong comes from Chakma language.The name of the sanctuary originated from the Kassalong river. Kassalong river is a major drought river in that area. This dense forest area declared as a wildlife sanctuary in 1881 by British Raj.

== Location ==
Kassalang reserve forest is located 11 km (6.83 mi) north-east of Baghaichari Upazila, Rangamati. It is situated between latitude of 23°8'43.8" to Longitude of 92°18'1.52". Kassalang shares its border with Sajek Valley and Dighinala to the south, Panchhari to the west, Indian state of Tripura to the north and Mizoram to the east. It covers the northern part of Chittagong Hill Tracts. Lungsir Tlang Mountain range passes through Kassalang reserve forest. Kassalang river has crossed across the forest. The prime water streams of the forest are Tangama chara and Goba chari.

== Climate ==
The Climate is generally humid and warm. Average humidity is 78.02%. The temperature rises up to 37 °C in May and drops down to minimum 8 °C in January. This dense forest enjoys tropical Monsoon from June to September every year.

The warmest month is May (32.72 °C / 90.9 °F), coldest month is January (16.22 °C / 61.2 °F), wettest month is July (453.28 mm / 17.85 in) and driest month is December (2.04 mm / 0.08 in).There is 205 days with no rain (56%). The yearly temperature is 27.17 °C (80.91 °F) and it is -0.57% lower than Bangladesh's averages. Kassalang typically receives about 141.7 millimeters (5.58 inches) of precipitation and has 159.23 rainy days (43.62% of the time) annually.

== Geography ==
Kassalang reserve forest is in a hilly area of eastern highlands. The estimate terrain elevation above sea level is 170 meters. Tertiary sediment had formed this forest's landscape which contains a large amount of iron, which is usually found as iron oxide. This element makes the soil yellowish or red. Sand is full of humus. The soil PH is mostly between 5.1 and 5.7 and the valley site soil is much fertile. Kassalong river is the main tributary of the Karnafuly river at the northeast of Kassalang reserve forest. The river receives the water of four hilly rivulets that flow north to south. The Kassalong meets with the Karnafuli 20 km north of Rangamati district. The river along with some stream and canal supply Fresh water to the reserve.

== Biodiversity ==
=== Flora ===
The general walk in the forest is not easy due to the hilly terrain. Kassalong is also one of the country's most dense forests decorated with a large diverse floral system. The most important commercial timber species of the Kassalang reserve forest is Pitraj, Civit, Jarul, Gamar, Koroi, Garjan, Chapalish, Toon, Champa, Batna, Udal, Simul, Chandul, etc. There is a large area of Bamboo jungle mostly of Melocanna baccifera. Most of the trees are of the Evergreen type and some are Semi-evergreen type specially the tallest trees. There are some Deciduous and Semi-deciduous trees, so the forest never loses its semi-evergreen look and remain green all year round. 467 plant species were identified, which include 144 tree species, 98 shrub species, 63 climbers, 144 herbs, 11 epiphytes and 7 ferns.

=== Fauna ===
Kassalang reserve forest is rich in wildlife resources. There is a decent amount of wild species in this forest. 7 new Mammals, 5 Reptiles and 4 Amphibious species have found in a recent serve. There are 123 species of bird in the forest including Golden-crested myna, one of the most rare Bird species of South Asia. The forest is also the residence of endangered species Great hornbill.

Asian elephant, Western hoolock gibbon, Dhole, Bengal fox, Golden jackal, Wild boar, Rhesus macaque, Capped langur, Southern red muntjac, Sambar deer, Hog deer, Gaur, Asian black bear, Indian leopard, Himalayan serow, Clouded leopard, Asian golden cat, Marbled cat, Burmese python, Arakan forest turtle are the supreme wild species. Kassalong reserve forest has the highest density of Clouded leopard in the country. The most rare species; Gaur and Himalayan red serow also had discovered in some camera trap images. There are also some report of Tigers in that area, near Kassalang river. Scientists said that there may have a little Tiger population in the forest. Creative Conservation Alliance has found Tiger Pugmark in the forest. Forest Department (Bangladesh) believe that there is a population of 15-20 tiger in that forest.

== Biome ==
=== Mountainous ===
Mountainous biome is the minor biome of Kassalong. There are some big mountain ranges along with a lot of small hills and ridges with high grasslands. It provides habitat for many bird species.

=== Forest ===
This is the major biome of the sanctuary. It is the home of all antelope, reptile and mammal of the forest. This densely forested area has covered the valley site of the reserve.

== Research ==
Creative Conservation Alliance and Bangladesh Forest Department are jointly researching Kassalong Reserve Forest. As a result, various species of animals have been discovered. Their work methods are survey, camera trap, pugmark following, genetical research etc. Forest areas like Kassalong provides a vast working place for the forestry and wildlife researchers.

== See also ==
- Chittagong Hill Tracts
- List of protected areas of Bangladesh
- Sangu Matamuhari
- Pablakhali Wildlife Sanctuary
- Sundarbans
- Rema-Kalenga Wildlife Sanctuary
