= List of National Parks in South Asia =

National Parks in South Asia

This is a list of National Parks in South Asia.

== List ==
=== Afganistan ===
- Band-e Amir National Park
- Wakhan National Park
- Nuristan National Park

=== Bangladesh ===
- Medhakachhapia National Park
- Nijhum Dwip National Park
- Kaptai National Park
- Lawachara National Park
- Himchari National Park
- Ramsagar National Park
- Madhupur National Park
- Bhawal National Park
- Dharmapur National Park
- Sheikh Jamal Inani National Park
- Birganj National Park
- Altadighi National Park
- Kadigarh National Park
- Singra National Park
- Nawabganj National Park
- Kuakata National Park
- Baroiyadhala National Park
- Khadim Nagar National Park
- Satchari National Park

=== Bhutan ===
- Phrumsengla National Park
- Jigme Dorji National Park
- Royal Manas National Park
- Wangchuck Centennial National Park
- Jigme Singye Wangchuck National Park

=== India ===
Source:

=== Nepal ===
- Valmiki Tiger Reserve
- Rara National Park
- Sagarmatha National Park
- Langtang National Park
- Shuklaphanta National Park
- Bardiya National Park
- Shivapuri Nagarjun National Park
- Banke National Park
- Shey Phoksundo National Park
- Khaptad National Park
- Makalu Barun National Park
- Chitwan National Park

=== Sri Lanka ===
Source:
