= Swatch of No Ground Marine Protected Area =

Protected wildlife sanctuary in the Bay of Bengal

Swatch of No Ground Marine Protected Area সোয়াচ অফ নো গ্রাউন্ড মেরিন সংরক্ষিত এলাকা
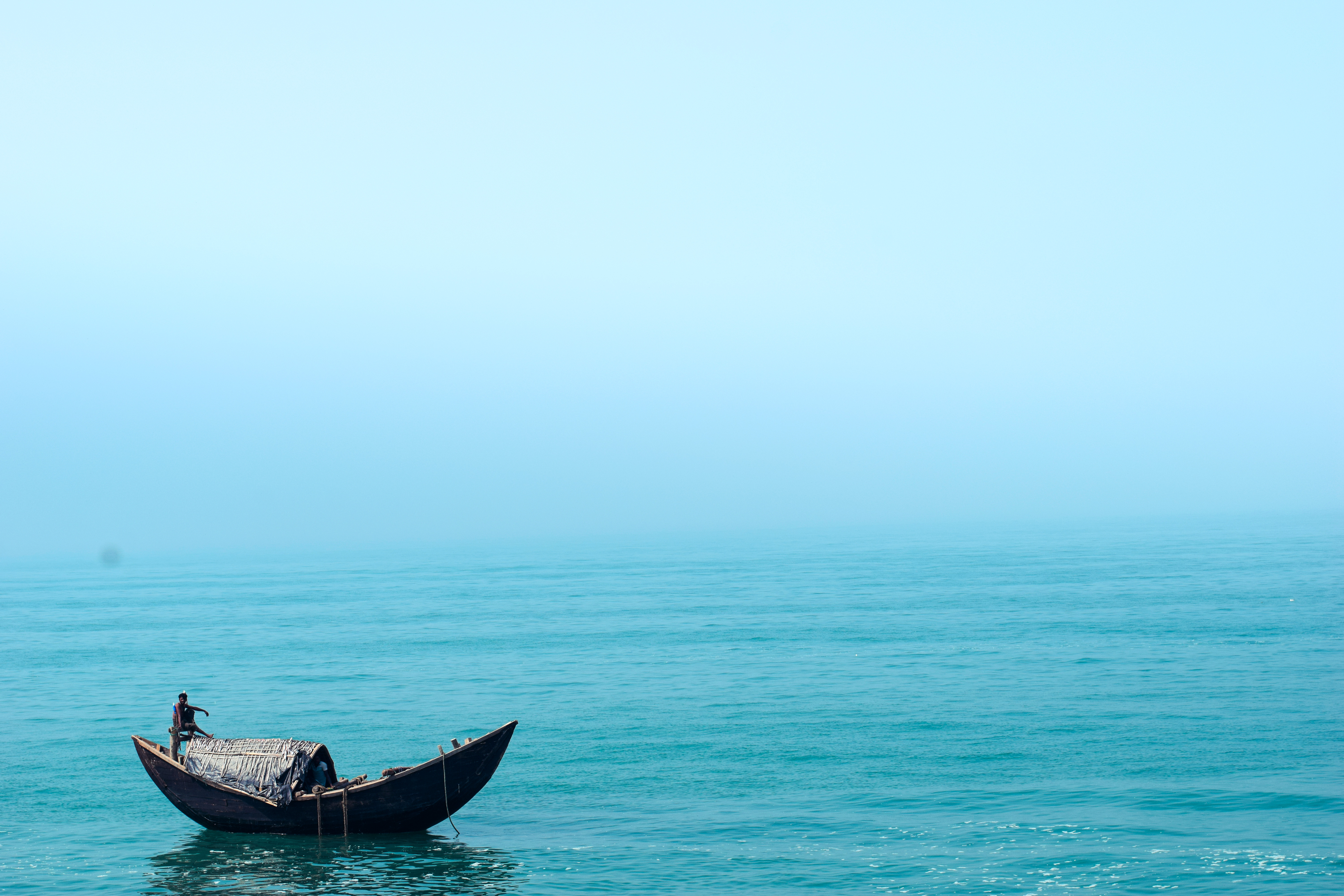

- Location within Bangladesh
- Location: Bay of Bengal, Bangladesh
- Nearest city: Bagerhat
- Coordinates: 21.2500°N 89.4667°E
- Area: 1738 sq km
- Established: 2014
- Governing body: Forest Department, Government of Bangladesh

Swatch of No Ground (SoNG) Marine Protected Area is a protected area of Bangladesh in the Bay of Bengal listed as an Important Marine Mammal Area (IMMA). The reserve covers an area of 1,636 km^{2} (632 sq mi).

It was established on 26 October 2014, making it the first marine protected area (MPA) in the country. The area hosts important habitats for several endangered creatures such as various species of dolphins and whales.

== Geography ==
The Swatch of No Ground (SoNG) is a 14 km wide trench in the Bay of Bengal. It is located 30 km from Dublar Char Islands, located in the Sundarbans. This deepest trench has a record size of about 1340 meters (400–450 m deeper than the surrounding mean seafloor depth of 1000 m). It has an average depth of about 1,200 meters underwater. This underwater trench is a part of the Bengal Fan, the largest underwater fan in the world. The fan in the Bay of Bengal, south of the Ganges-Brahmaputra delta, is also known as Ganga Fan.

== Location and shape ==
The head of the Swatch of No Ground is located on the continental shelf of Bangladesh. From there, the canyon runs mainly southward into the Bay of Bengal.

The canyon is about 160 km long and reaches a depth of about 1,400 metres in its deeper part. In some areas, it is several kilometres wide. Its sides are clearly deeper than the surrounding sea floor.

The canyon forms a natural path from the shallow waters near the Bangladesh coast toward the deeper Bay of Bengal.

Sediment transport

The Ganges and Brahmaputra rivers carry huge amounts of sand, mud and silt from the Himalayas and the surrounding regions. Much of this material reaches Bangladesh and enters the Bay of Bengal.

Some of the sediment moves into the Swatch of No Ground. Once inside the canyon, sediment can move downhill because of gravity. These flows can contain large amounts of mud and sand mixed with seawater. They are known as turbidity currents.

These underwater flows can travel long distances and carry sediment from the continental shelf toward the deep ocean.

Connection with the Bengal Fan

The Swatch of No Ground is an important part of the sediment system that feeds the Bengal Fan.

The basic sediment route can be described as:

Himalayas → Ganges and Brahmaputra → Bangladesh delta → Swatch of No Ground → deep Bay of Bengal → Bengal Fan

The Bengal Fan was built over millions of years from sediment carried from the land into the ocean. The Swatch of No Ground helps connect the river-delta system with this much larger deep-sea sediment system.

Geological history

The present shape of the canyon developed over a long period of geological time. Its development has been influenced by changes in sea level, river activity and the movement of sediment on the sea floor.

During periods when sea level was lower, the coastline was farther south than it is today. This allowed rivers to carry sediment closer to the edge of the continental shelf. Large amounts of sediment could then enter submarine channels and move toward deeper water.

The canyon has therefore changed over time as sea level and sediment supply changed.

Ancient River Connection

During periods of low sea level, large parts of the Bangladesh continental shelf were exposed as land. The Ganges and Brahmaputra rivers then flowed farther south than they do today.

These rivers carried large amounts of sediment toward the shelf edge. Some ancient river channels were connected to the valley that developed into the Swatch of No Ground.

After the last Ice Age, sea level rose and flooded the shelf. The river channels became underwater features, while the Swatch of No Ground continued to carry sediment through turbidity currents into the deep Bay of Bengal.

== Biodiversity ==
The area has notable biodiversity of oceanic fauna such as cetaceans, sea turtles, fish, and sea birds. Among these, local populations of cetaceans have been the primal focus of past studies; core species include Bryde's whales, spinner dolphins, Indo-Pacific bottlenose dolphins, Indo-Pacific humpback dolphins, pantropical spotted dolphins, Irrawaddy dolphins, Indo-Pacific finless porpoises, and species with less-frequency include minke whales, rough-toothed dolphins and false killer whales. Some of these species are genetically unique and endangered.

There are a number of other notable species in the area, such as whale sharks, hammerhead sharks, tunas, groupers, hawksbill turtles, olive ridley turtles, masked boobies, great black-backed gulls, crested terns, swimming crabs, and so on.

== See also ==
- Sundarbans National Park
- Nijhum Dwip National Park and St. Martin's Island - MPAs with marine mammal diversity, declared after the Swatch of No Ground MPA
- List of protected areas of Bangladesh
