= Fashiakhali Wildlife Sanctuary =

Wildlife sanctuary in Bangladesh

- IUCN category IV (habitat/species management area)
- Location within Bangladesh
- Location: Cox's bazar District, Chittagong Division, Bangladesh
- Nearest city: Fashiakhali
- Coordinates: 21°40′00″N 92°08′00″E
- Area: 1,302 ha (3,220 acres)
- Established: 2007

Fashiakhali Wildlife Sanctuary (Bengali: ফাসিয়াখালী বন্যপ্রানী সংরক্ষণ অভয়ারন্য) is a wildlife sanctuary in southern Chakaria Upazila of Bangladesh, located on an island in Bay of Bengal in the south of the country. The area of the sanctuary is 1,302 ha (3,220 acres), and is located on eastern and southern hills of Bangladesh.

== Climate ==
The rainfall is very high during the monsoon season,

== History ==
Two forest villages of 112 inhabitants were set up in 1950. Later on a large population of Rohingya have settled inside the sanctuary.

== Management ==
The park is managed by one range officer and one forest beat guard. It is administered by the Coastal Forest Division at Bhola. It was declared as wildlife sanctuary on 2007 under the Bangladesh wildlife (Preservation) Amendment Act of 1947. No forestry activities is carried out in the mangrove forest except conservation activities. There are 16 villages inside the sanctuary with 33,00 population.

== Biodiversity ==
The sanctuary has a tropical evergreen and semi-evergreen type of forest; the sanctuary is covered with dense shrubby vegetation with patches of dense forest and bamboos.

=== Flora ===
The vegetation is composed of forest of Gurjan (Dipterocarpus turbinatus) and Dhakijam (Syzygium species). There are plantations of teak (Tectona grandis), Eucalyptus species and Acacia species.

=== Fauna ===
The Asian elephant (Elephas maximus) is the major threatened species found in the sanctuary. The elephants are mainly restricted to the Dulahazara, Ringvong and Fashiakhali reserved forest blocks. The savannas and the perennial waterbodies inside the sanctuary support the population of elephants. The other threatened species are hog badger (Arctonyx collaris), muntjac deer (Muntiacus muntjak) and wild boar (Sus scrofa)

== Threats ==
The threats are encroachment for cultivation land, removal of forest produce and tree cutting by the local people . The 5 kilometres (3.1 mi) long railway line proposed Chittagong–Cox's Bazar railway line railway project will be passing through the buffer zone of the sanctuary .

== See also ==
- List of protected areas of Bangladesh
