= Himchari National Park =

National park in Bangladesh

- IUCN category IV (habitat/species management area)
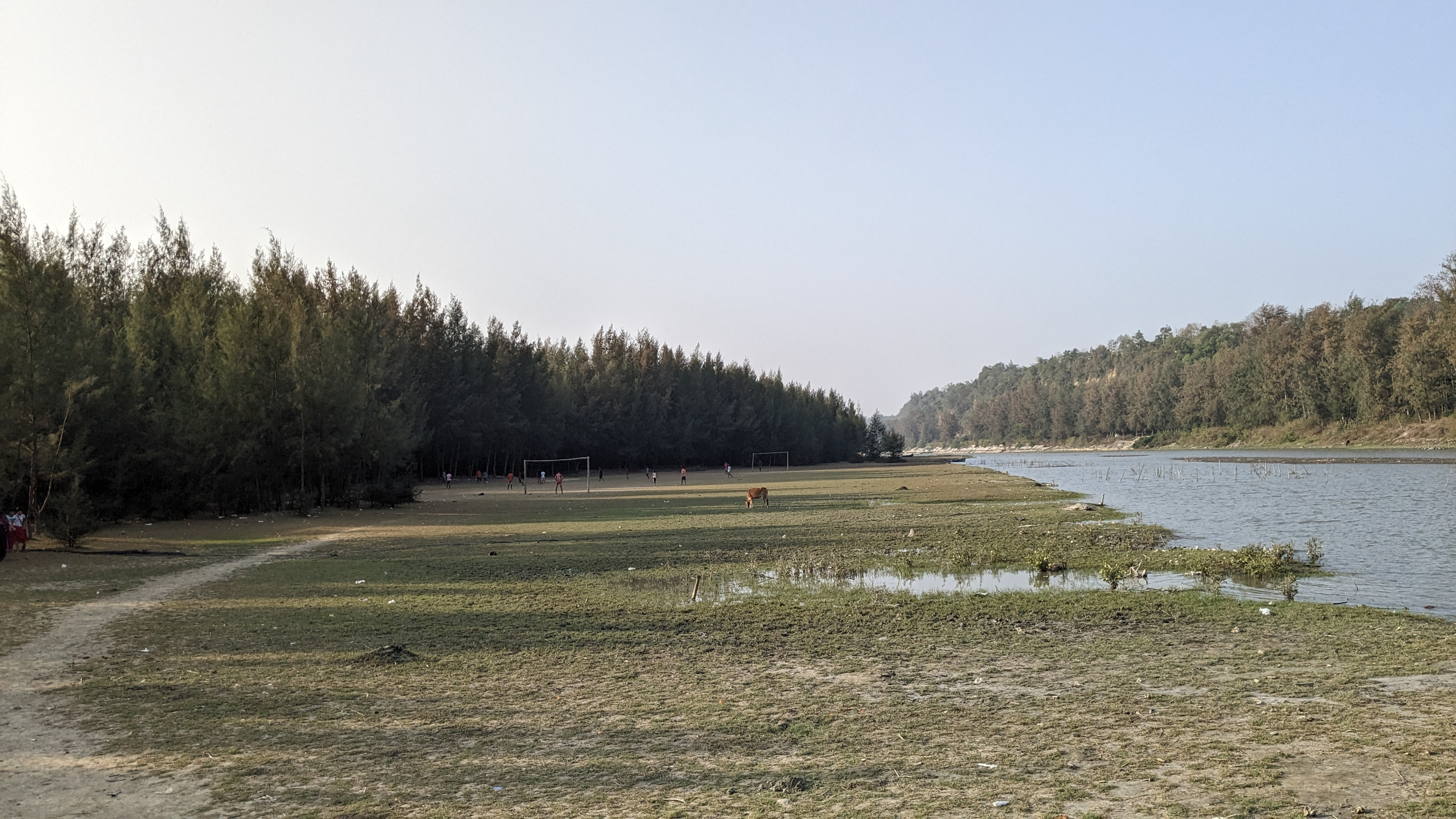
- Himchari National Park

- Location within Bangladesh
- Location: Cox's Bazar District, Bangladesh
- Nearest city: Cox's Bazar
- Coordinates: 21°21′17.4″N 92°02′50.0″E
- Area: 1,729.00 ha (4,272.5 acres)
- Established: February 15, 1980

Himchari National Park (Bengali: হিমছড়ি জাতীয় উদ্যান) is a national park in Bangladesh, located at Ramu and Cox's Bazar Sadar Upazila, Cox's Bazar District, in the southeast region of the country. It is located mainly on the hills and is adjoining to Bay of Bengal to the west. It encompasses about 1,729 ha (17.29 km^{2}) of mixed evergreen forest. It was declared a protected area in 1980.

== Administration ==
The entire forest area is managed and is under the jurisdiction of Cox's Bazar South Forest Division. There are four forest beats in the parks namely Kolatoli, Chainda, Jhilongja and Link Road.The place is visited mostly for the famous broken hills and Row of christmas trees.

== Biodiversity ==
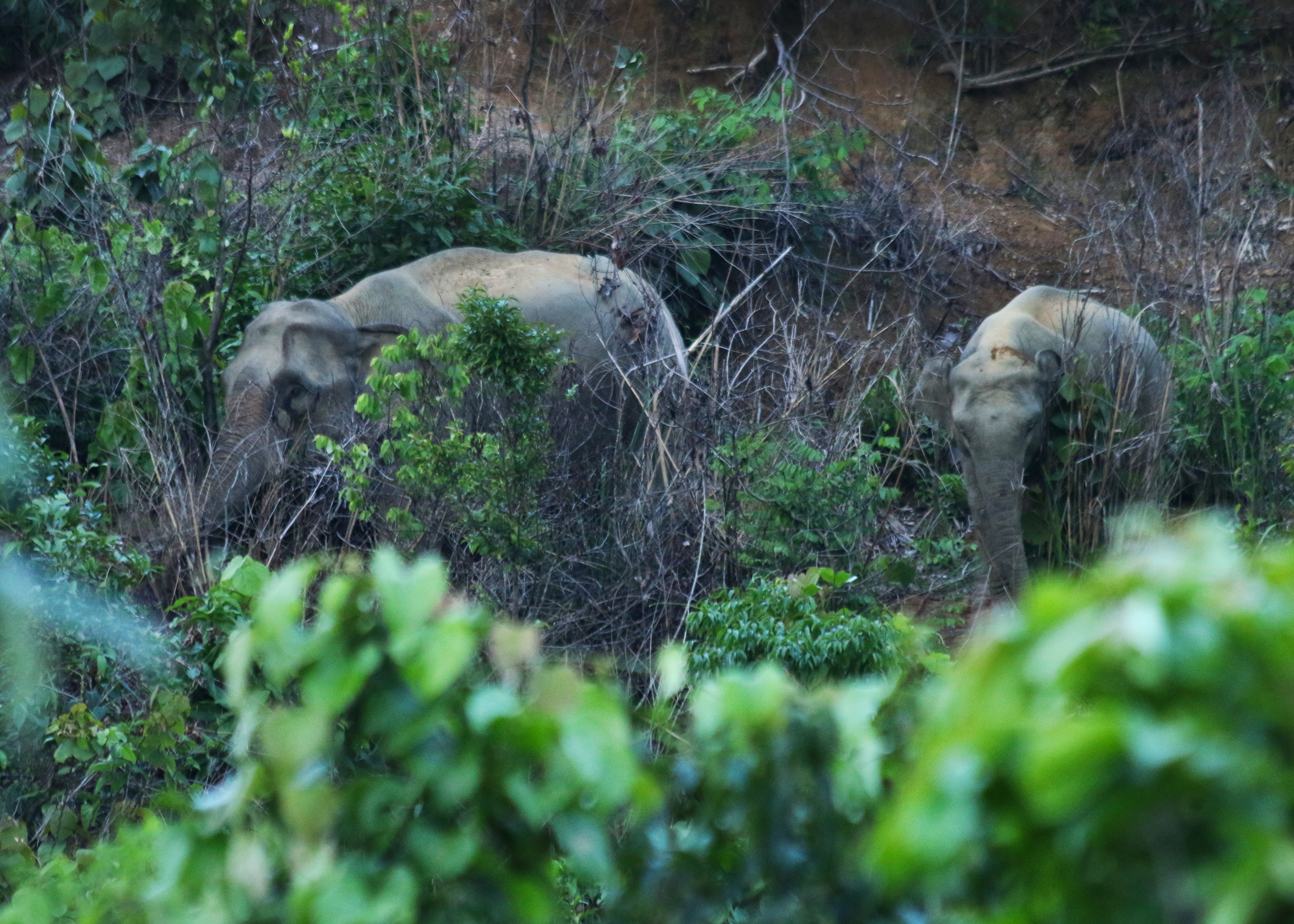
Asian elephant in Himchori

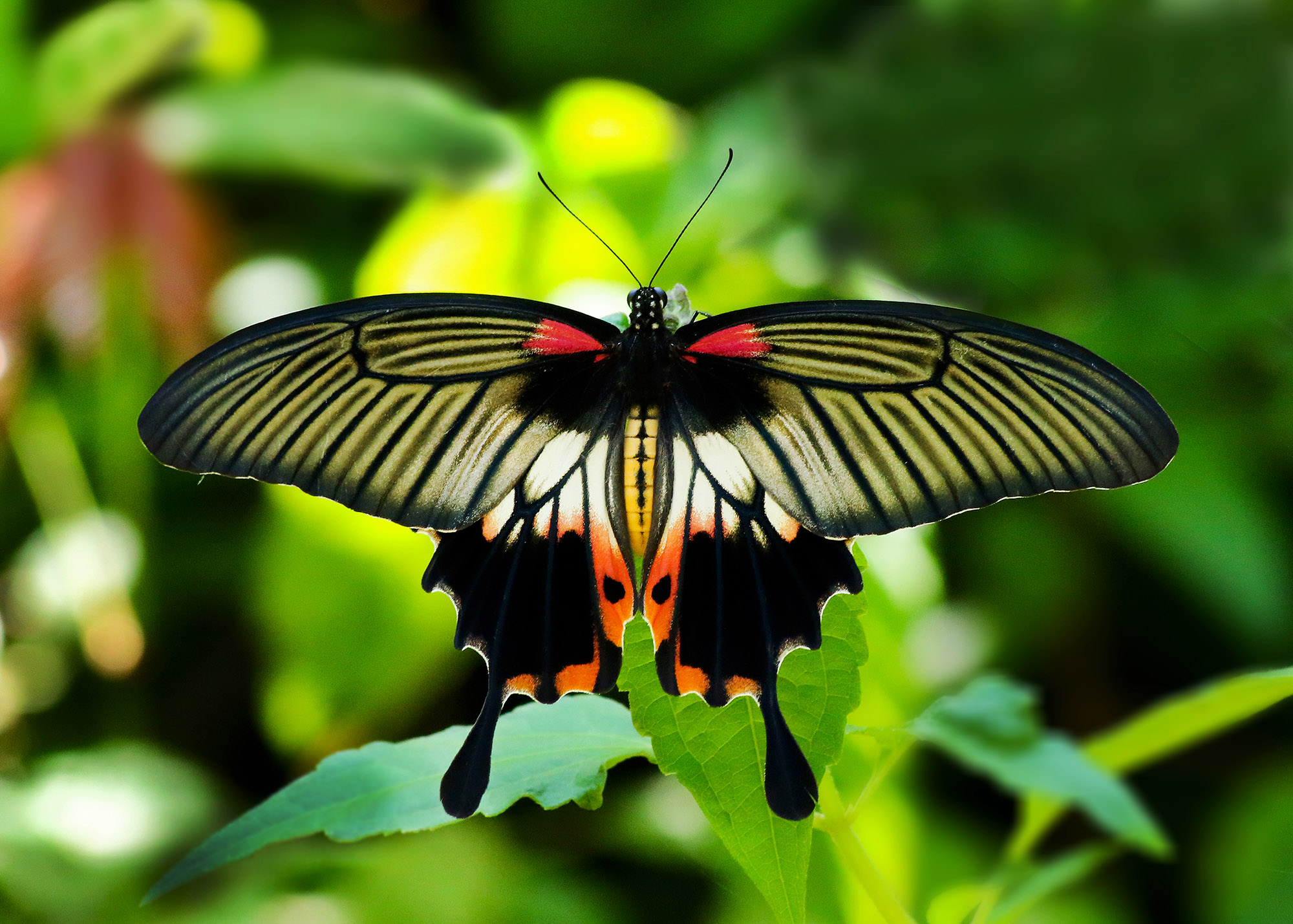
Great mormon, Himchori

=== Flora ===
The general walk in the forest is not easy due to hilly terrain and dense vegetation. About 117 tree species belonging to 37 families have been recorded. Some near-endangered plant species recorded are Elaeis guineensis, Garcinia lanceifolia, Elaeocarpus tectorius, Elaeocarpus floribundus, Suregada multiflora, Lithocarpus elegans var. elegans and Acronychia pedunculata.

=== Fauna ===
The fauna consists mainly of Ridley sea turtle, 286 bird species and 26 mammal species. The barn swallow and Asian palm swift are common birds in the national park. Mammals include Hoolock gibbon, leopard cat, fishing cat, tiger, Asian black bear, sloth bear, Asian elephant, wild boar, Rhesus macaque and mongoose.

== Human settlement ==
There are 4000 people living inside the National park area. They are mostly migrants and are involved in fishing and cultivation for their livelihood.

== Threats ==
The loss of tree diversity and population is due to encroachment for cultivation, invasion of weed species, grazing of cattle, collection of minor forest produces and fuel wood, fire hazard, expansion of network of roads and other infrastructure projects.

== See also ==
- List of protected areas of Bangladesh
