= Shibsha Dolphin Sanctuary =

Protected area in Bangladesh

- Location within Bangladesh
- Location: Khulna, Khulna Division, Bangladesh
- Coordinates: 22.50°N 89.70°E
- Area: 2,155 ha (5,330 acres)
- Established: 2020
- Governing body: Bangladesh Forest Department

Shibsha Dolphin Sanctuary (Bengali: শিবসা শুশুক অভয়ারণ্য) is a designated dolphin sanctuary located in the Shibsha River in the Sundarbans area of Khulna District, Bangladesh. On 4 March 2020, the Ministry of Environment, Forest and Climate Change (Bangladesh) officially declared it a protected area under the Wildlife (Conservation and Security) Act, 2012. The main objective of the sanctuary is to ensure the conservation and reproductive safety of the Ganges river dolphin and the Irrawaddy dolphin.

== Location and area ==
The sanctuary covers a section of the Shibsha River located between Dacope and Paikgachha in Khulna District. It spans about 2,155 hectares (21.55 square kilometres). The Shibsha River lies in the eastern part of the Sundarbans and serves as an important habitat for local fisheries and aquatic biodiversity.

== History ==
Due to the declining numbers of river and coastal cetaceans in Bangladesh, the government initiated the declaration of special aquatic sanctuaries under the Wildlife Act of 2012. In 2020, nine rivers and estuaries were simultaneously declared dolphin sanctuaries, including Shibsha. Prior to the declaration, joint surveys by the Forest Department and UNDP found that the density of Ganges river dolphins in the Shibsha River was comparatively high.

== Biodiversity ==
The sanctuary is home mainly to two species of freshwater and coastal dolphins:

- Ganges river dolphin ( Platanista gangetica gangetica)
- Irrawaddy dolphin (Orcaella brevirostris)

Additionally, the river supports various species of fish, crabs, shrimp, and birds, which play an important role in maintaining the balance of local biodiversity.

== Conservation and challenges ==
The Bangladesh Forest Department has formed Dolphin Conservation Teams in the sanctuary area. These teams raise awareness among local fishermen, prevent the use of illegal nets (especially gillnets), and assist in rescuing injured dolphins. Directives have also been issued to control boat speeds and prevent pollution in the sanctuary.

=== Challenges ===
Major challenges to the Shibsha Dolphin Sanctuary include:

- Excessive boat traffic and noise pollution
- Use of illegal fishing nets and methods
- Water pollution and industrial waste discharge
- Increased salinity due to climate change

Conservation experts believe that without sustainable management and local community involvement, achieving long-term success will be difficult.

== See also ==
- Padma Bridge Wildlife Sanctuary
- Sundarbans
