= Hail Haor Wildlife Sanctuary =

Wildlife sanctuary in Bangladesh

- IUCN category IV (habitat/species management area)
- Location within Bangladesh
- Location: Moulvibazar District, Sylhet Division, Bangladesh
- Nearest city: Moulvibazar
- Coordinates: 24°22′00″N 91°41′00″E
- Area: 8,906.00 hectares
- Established: 1983

Hail Haor Wildlife Sanctuary (Bengali: হাইল হাওর বন্যপ্রাণী সংরক্ষণ অভয়ারণ্য) is a major wildlife sanctuary in Bangladesh. It is one of the most important wetlands in the Sylhet Basin for the resident and migratory waterfowls. It is also important watersource for the inhabitants living around when all other sources dry up during summer. The sanctuary is located in Moulvibazar District, in the northeast region of the country.

== Description ==
The sanctuary is located mainly between the hills on the south, west and east side and Manu and Kushiyara river plains on the north. The hills are covered with tea gardens and natural forest blocks. The water of the wetland extends to cover approximately 14,000 ha (140 km^{2}) during the monsoon and shrinks to 3,000 ha (30 km^{2}) during the summer season. It is restricted to 130 beels and narrow canals. There are about 172000 people living in 62 villages around the wetland. The receding water after monsoon exposes the land which is converted to rice fields by local people. The Bangladesh Government and the United States Agency for International Development implemented a project called 'Management of Aquatic ecosystems through Community Husbandry' from 1998 to 2008. This project involved local groups in wetland conservation, restoration and management.

The Forest Department has set up a centre for protection of waterfowls from hunting and poaching.

== Location ==
It is located 3 kilometres (1.9 mi) north-west of Srimangal (Bengali: শ্রীমঙ্গল) and 14 kilometres (8.7 mi) south west of Moulavibazar.

== Climate ==
The area has a tropical monsoon climate with a mean annual precipitation of 4,000 mm (160 in), most of which falls from June to September. The temperatures in the Srimangal area are normally between 9 °C (48 °F) in winter and 32.8 °C (91.0 °F) in summer.

== Biodiversity ==
The flora and fauna are mainly associated with wetland adaptations.

=== Flora ===
Much of the lake area is overgrown with Indian lotus (Nelumbo nucifera) and water hyacinth (Pontederia crassipes). The majority of hydrophytes are Typha elephantina, Trapa bispinosa, Hygrorhiza aristata, and species of Utricularia, Ceratophyllum, Vallisneria, Hydrilla, Najas, Potamogeton, Nymphoides, Pistia, Lemna and Azolla. The trees and shrubs growing in adjacent area include Bambusa spp., Musa spp., Mangifera indica, Erythrina spp. and Crataeva magna.

=== Fauna ===
There is a large variety of waterfowl found in the sanctuary, with a population of 40,000 to 50,000 present during winter. They include lesser whistling duck, fulvous whistling duck, cotton pygmy goose, garganey, northern pintail, northern shoveler, common teal, common pochard, tufted duck, gadwall, spotbill duck, bar-headed goose, greylag goose, ruddy shelduck, comb duck, mallard, red-crested pochard, common pochard, Baer's pochard, grebe, little cormorant, Indian pond heron, cattle egret, little egret, intermediate egret, great egret, water cock, moorhen, purple swamphen, common coot, pheasant-tailed jacana, bronze-winged jacana, along with herons, kingfishers, egrets and terns. Raptors include osprey, Eurasian marsh harrier and pied harrier. Threatened birds include Baer’s pochard, greater spotted eagle and Pallas’s fish eagle. The sanctuary has been designated an Important Bird Area (IBA) by BirdLife International.

Other wildlife occurring in the area include mainly amphibians, reptiles and turtles. The fishes include Catla catla, Labeo rohita, L. calbasu, L. gonius, Cirrhina mrigala, Barbus spp., Wallago attu, Mystus tengra, Mystus aor and Oampokpabda, Gadusia chapra, Clupea spp., Notoptenis notopterus, Clarius batrachus, Heteropneustes fossilis, Channa spp., Anabas testudineus and Colis afasciota. Freshwater shrimps of the genus Macrobrachium are common.

== Threats ==
Existing wetland continue to be under the threat of siltation, being drained for agriculture and industry. The water bodies are converted to small fishing blocks by artificial embankments and roads. This has resulted in decline of fish population along with the waterfowls.

The loss of tree diversity and population is due to encroachments for cultivation, invasion of weed species, grazing of cattles, collection of minor forest produces and fuel wood, fire hazard, expansion of network of roads and other infrastructure projects.

There are large population of people living along the wetland. They are mostly migrants and are involved in fishing and cultivation for their livelihood.

== See also ==
- List of protected areas of Bangladesh
