= Altadighi National Park =

National park of Bangladesh

- IUCN category IV (habitat/species management area)
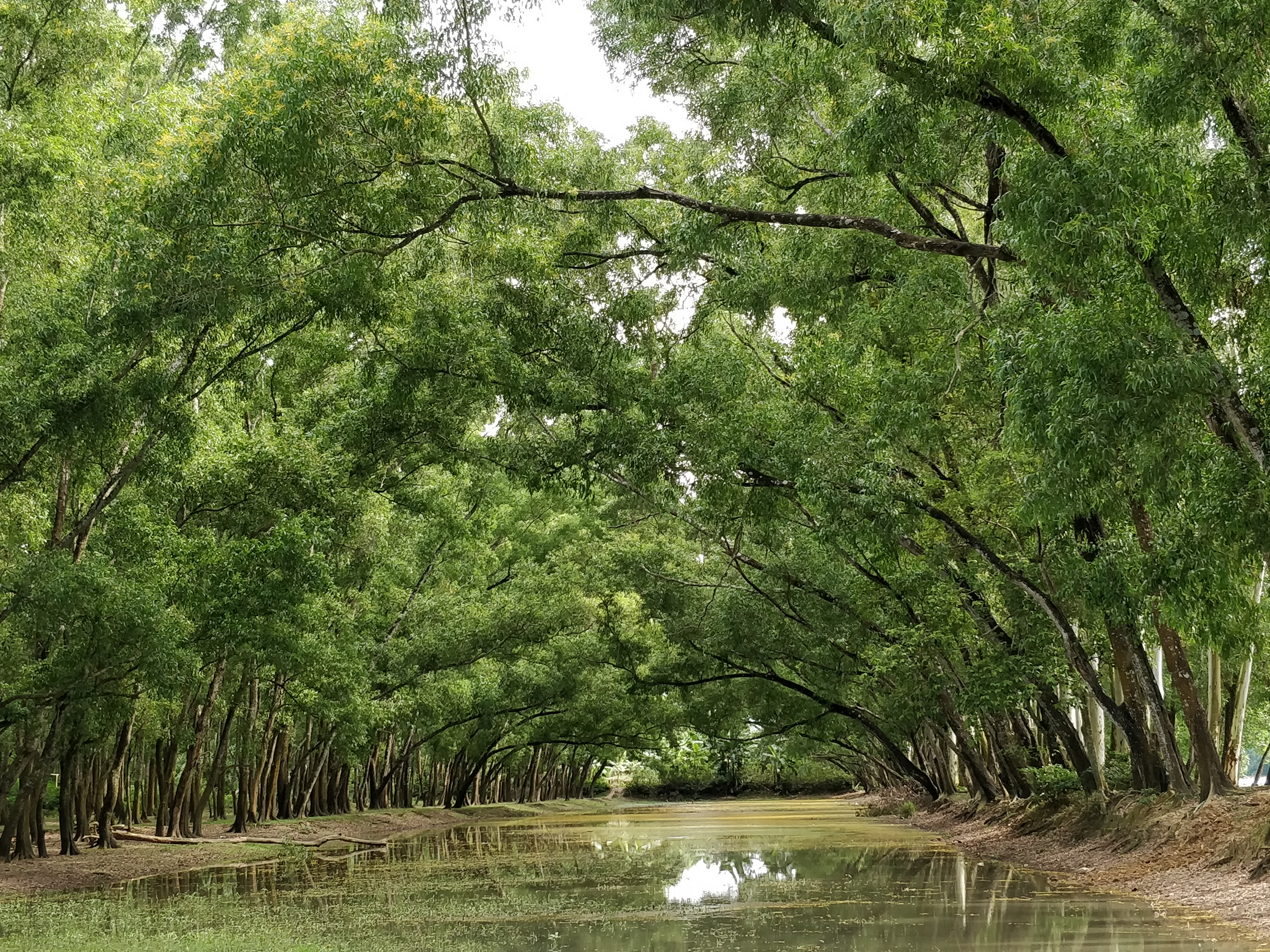
- Foliage was verdant in 2018.
- Interactive map of Altadighi National Park
- Location: Naogaon District, Bangladesh
- Coordinates: 25.1865°N 88.8661°E
- Area: 264.12 ha (652.7 acres)
- Established: 14 December 2011; 14 years ago

Altadighi National Park (Bengali: আলতাদীঘি জাতীয় উদ্যান) is an IUCN Category IV national park and nature reserve in Bangladesh. The park is located in Dhamoirhat Upazila, Naogaon District, near the border with India. It is under the jurisdiction of the Paikbandha Forest Range of the Bangladesh Forest Department.

It was officially designated as a national park by the government of Bangladesh on 14 December 2011. It covers an area of 264.12 hectares (652.7 acres), including the largest reservoir in Naogaon District, spanning 55.46 acres (22.44 ha). On 9 June 2016, 17.34 hectares (42.8 acres) of adjoining forest was designated a Special Biodiversity Conservation Area by the Forest Department.

== Etymology ==
The name is traditionally believed to derive from alta, a red dye applied to women's feet, and dighi, meaning a large pond. According to local folklore, King Vishwanath dug a lake to provide his people with water, based on his queen's dream. She insisted it had to be as large as the distance she could walk barefoot. When she had walked about a mile, the king's ministers became concerned, and secretly applied alta to the queen's feet to make her believe that they were bleeding, thereby ending her walk. The pond was subsequently named after the incident.

== Flora and fauna ==
Fauna of this park includes junglefowl, golden jackals, civets, jungle cats, and monitor lizards.

== Threats ==
The park is under threat from human encroachment. Between 2016 and 2024, Altadighi Lake shrank from 14.15 to 5.65 hectares (35.0 to 14.0 acres), a loss of about 60%. The vegetation has also suffered. Over 27 hectares (67 acres) of dense forest deteriorated into degraded forest, and over 13 hectares (32 acres) of degraded forest became "non-vegetated zones".

In 2026, the Forest Department began implementing a controversial project, supposedly to deepen and improve the reservoir and protect Altadighi's biodiversity. However, over 1000 trees were reported to have been cut down, generating Tk35,95,256 in revenue.
