= Sonarchar Wildlife Sanctuary =

Wildlife sanctuary in Bangladesh

- IUCN category II (national park)
- Location within Bangladesh
- Location: Patuakhali, Barisal, Bangladesh
- Coordinates: 21.839952°N 90.503542°E
- Area: 2,026.48 ha (5,007.5 acres)
- Established: 24 December 2011

Sonarchar Wildlife Sanctuary (Bengali: সোনারচর বন্যপ্রাণ অভয়ারণ্য) is a wildlife sanctuary located near Rangabali Upazila at Patuakhali District of Bangladesh. The area of the sanctuary is 2,026.48 ha (5,007.5 acres). It was officially declared as a wildlife sanctuary by the government of Bangladesh on 24 December 2011.

It is one of the safe zones for vultures as per the Vulture Safe Zone-2 Schedule of the government of Bangladesh in 2012.

== See also ==
- List of wildlife sanctuaries of Bangladesh
