= Bengal Fan =

Largest submarine fan on Earth

Coordinates: 12°N 87°E

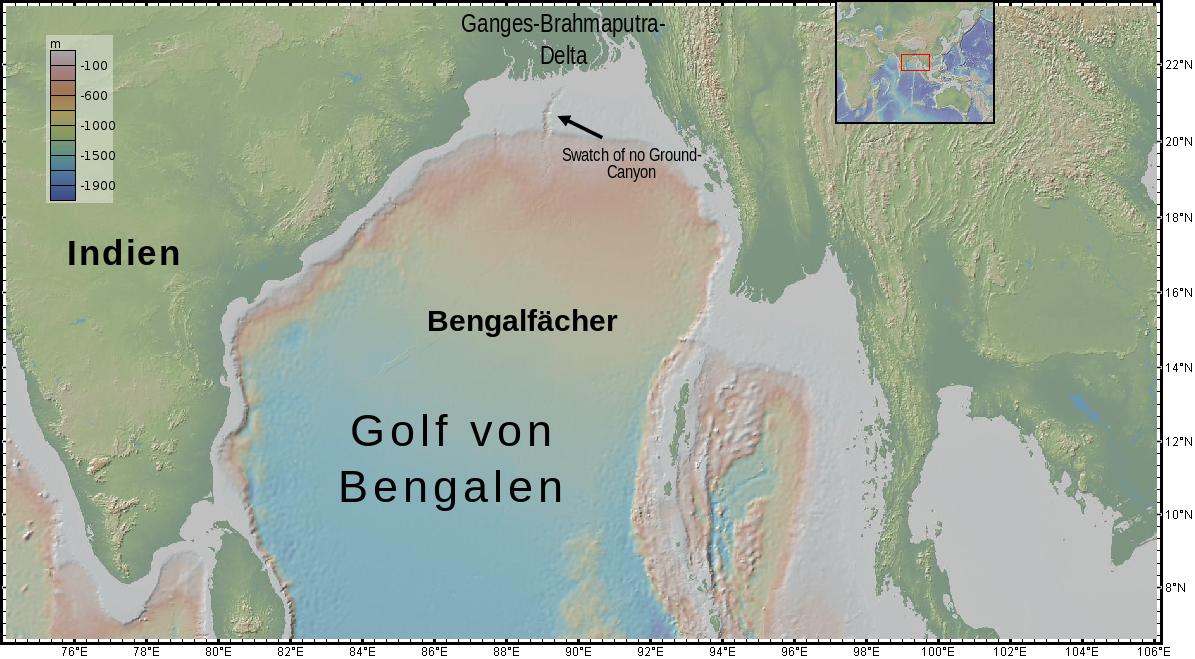
Bathymetry of Bay of Bengal, with the submarine Bengal fan and submarine "Swatch of No Ground" Canyon

The Bengal Fan, also known as the Ganges Fan, is the largest submarine fan on Earth.

== Geography ==
It is located in the Bay of Bengal, being about 3,000 km (1,900 mi) long, 1,430 km (890 mi) wide with a maximum thickness of 16.5 km (10.3 mi). The fan resulted from the uplift and erosion of the Himalayas and the Tibetan Plateau produced by the collision between the Indian Plate and the Eurasian Plate. Most of the sediment is supplied by the Ganges and Brahmaputra rivers which supply the Lower Meghna delta in Bangladesh and the Hooghly delta in West Bengal (India). Several other large rivers in Bangladesh and India provide smaller contributions. Turbidity currents have transported the sediment through a series of submarine canyons, some of which are more than 1,500 miles (2,414 km) in length, to be deposited in the Bay of Bengal up to 30 degrees latitude from where it began. To date, the oldest sediments recovered from the Bengal fan are from Early Miocene age. Their mineralogical and geochemical characteristics confirm their Himalayan origin and demonstrate that the Himalaya was already a major mountain range 20 million years ago.

The fan completely covers the floor of the Bay of Bengal. It is bordered to the west by the continental slope of eastern India, to the north by the continental slope of Bangladesh and to east by the northern part of Sunda Trench off Myanmar and the Andaman Islands, the accretionary wedge associated with subduction of the Indo-Australian Plate beneath the Sunda Plate and continues along the west side of the Ninety East Ridge. The Nicobar Fan, another lobe of the fan, lies east of the Ninety East Ridge.

== History ==
The fan was first identified by bathymetric survey in the sixties by Bruce C. Heezen and Marie Tharp which identified the abyssal cone and canyon structures. It was delineated and named by Joseph Curray and David Moore following a geological and geophysical survey in 1968.

== Biodiversity ==
A deep sea canyon called Swatch of No Ground (SoNG) is located south of Sundarbans National Park and the island of Dublar Char. This area hosts important habitats for cetaceans including endangered species such as various species of dolphins and Bryde's whales (see Swatch of No Ground Marine Protected Area).
