= Hajarikhil Wildlife Sanctuary =

Wildlife sanctuary in Bangladesh

- IUCN category II (national park)
- Location within Bangladesh
- Location: Chittagong District, Fatikchhari Upazila, Bangladesh.
- Nearest city: Fatikchari
- Coordinates: 22°40′00″N 91°40′00″E
- Area: 2,908 ha (7,190 acres)
- Established: 2010

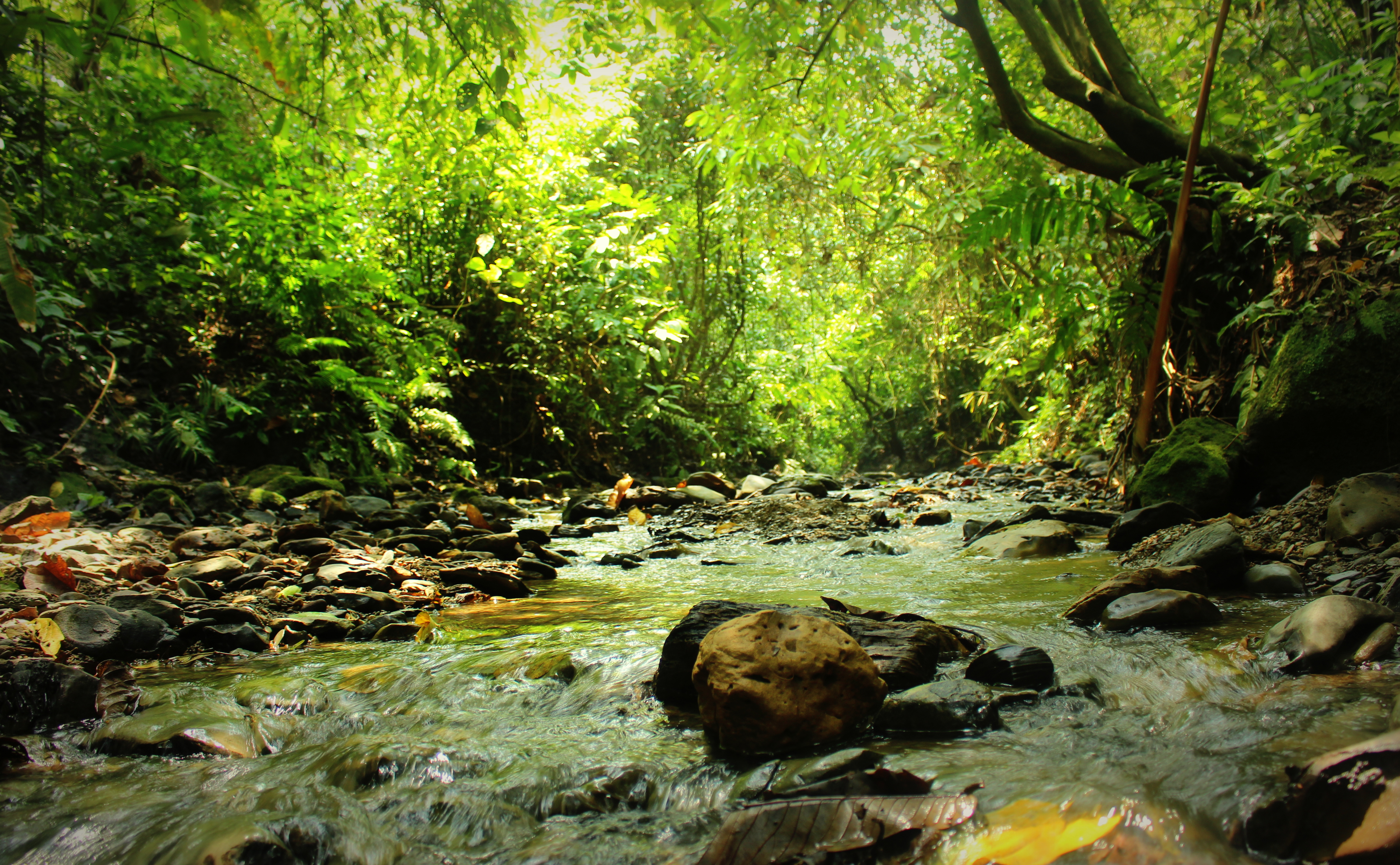
Hajarikhil Wildlife Sanctuary

Hajarikhil Wildlife Sanctuary (Bengali: হাজারিখিল বন্যপ্রাণী অভয়ারণ্য) is a Wildlife sanctuary at the Ramgarh- Sitakunda forests, 45 km north of the Chittagong port in south-East of Bangladesh. The IUCN protected area category is II.

== Description ==
The terrain is irregular with many ridges protruding into spurs running irregularly. The conditions are moist tropical and mean annual rainfall is 3,000 mm (120 in). The climatic conditions are typically sub-tropical with a dry spell from November to May. The sanctuary receives heavy rainfall in June–September. The soil is loam, clay loam or sandy loam at different places. The IUCN protected area category is IIC.

== History ==
There are 925 families living inside the sanctuary mostly from the tribal ethnic groups.

== Biodiversity ==
The sanctuary has a Tropical evergreen and semi-evergreen type of forest; the sanctuary is covered with dense shrubby vegetation with patches of dense forest and Bamboos.

=== Flora ===
The forest type is mainly tropical evergreen and semi evergreen. The predominant tree species include Dipterocarpus spp., Artocarpus chaplasha, Tetrameles nudiflora, Cedrela toona, Mesua ferrea, Eugenia spp., Ficus spp. and Albizzia procera. The undergrowth in the forest is mainly bamboo species and Eupatorium odorum. There are 478 species of plants identified in the sanctuary. They include 189 tree species, 119 shrubs, 26 climbers, 170 herbs and 2 epiphytes. Some of the rare species rediscovered are Aglaia edulis (Roxb.) Wall., Knema erratica (Hook.f. and Thom.) J. Sinclair and Artabotrys caudatus Wall ex Hook.f. and Thom.

=== Fauna ===
The commonly found wild animals are rhesus macaque (Macaca mulatta), capped langur (Presbytis pileata), dhole (Cuon alpinus), wild boar (Sus scrofa), western hoolock gibbon (Hylobates hoolock) and Indian muntjac (Muntiacus muntjak). The reptiles include Indian rock python (Python molurus). The globally near threatened species of Himalayan serow (Capricornis thar) is found in the sanctuary. There are 216 species of birds identified in the sanctuary.

== See also ==
- List of protected areas of Bangladesh
