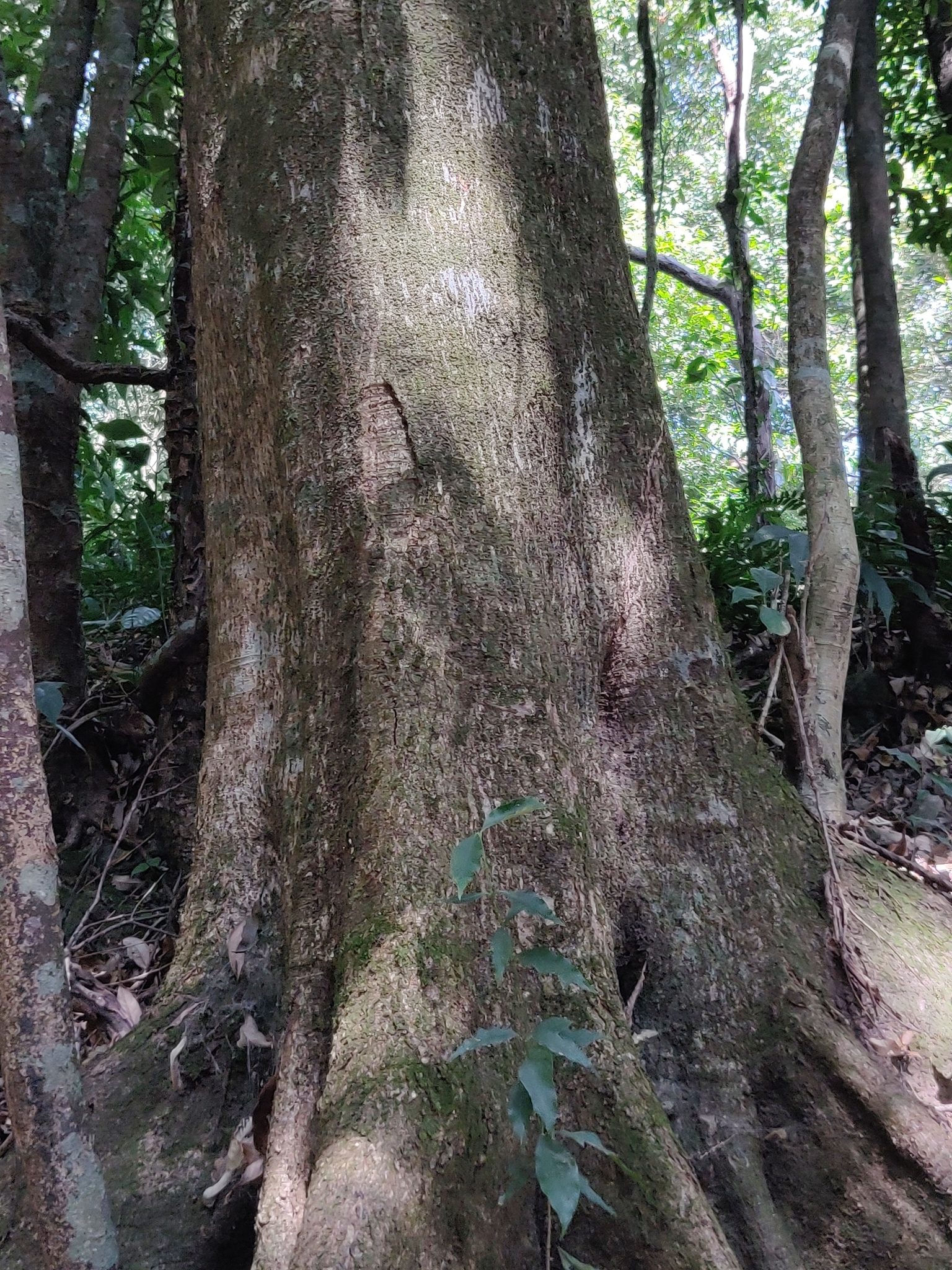
- In Meghalaya, India

Conservation status
- Least Concern (IUCN 3.1)

Scientific classification
- Kingdom: Plantae
- Clade: Embryophytes
- Clade: Tracheophytes
- Clade: Spermatophytes
- Clade: Angiosperms
- Clade: Eudicots
- Clade: Rosids
- Order: Fagales
- Family: Fagaceae
- Genus: Lithocarpus
- Species: L. elegans

Binomial name
- Lithocarpus elegans (Blume) Hatus. ex Soepadmo

Synonyms
- Synonymy: Arcaula spicata Raf.; Castanea glomerata (Roxb.) Blume; Lithocarpus collettii (King ex Hook.f.) A.Camus; Lithocarpus elegans var. collettii (King ex Hook.f.) H.B.Naithani & S.N.Biswas; Lithocarpus finetii (Hickel & A.Camus) A.Camus; Lithocarpus gelinicus C.C.Huang & Y.T.Chang; Lithocarpus gracilipes C.C.Huang & Y.T.Chang; Lithocarpus grandifolius (D.Don) S.N.Biswas; Lithocarpus intermedius Barnett; Lithocarpus microcalyx (Korth.) A.Camus; Lithocarpus rhioensis (Hance) A.Camus; Lithocarpus spicatus Rehder & E.H.Wilson; Lithocarpus spicatus var. collettii (King ex Hook.f.) Hand.-Mazz.; Lithocarpus spicatus var. elegans (Blume) A.Camus; Lithocarpus spicatus var. glaberrimus (Blume) A.Camus; Lithocarpus spicatus var. gracilipes (Miq.) A.Camus; Lithocarpus spicatus var. placentarius (Blume) A.Camus; Lithocarpus spicatus var. poilaneana A.Camus; Lithocarpus spicatus var. polycarpus A.Camus; Lithocarpus spicatus var. typica A.Camus; Pasania finetii Hickel & A.Camus; Pasania glaberrima (Blume) Saporta; Pasania glomerata (Roxb.) Oerst.; Pasania mixta (A.DC.) Oerst.; Pasania placentaria (Blume) Oerst.; Pasania pseudomolucca (Morales ex A.DC.) Oerst.; Pasania spicata Oerst.; Quercus anceps Korth.; Quercus arcaula var. racemosa Blume; Quercus arcola Buch.-Ham. ex Wall.; Quercus depressa Blume; Quercus elegans Blume; Quercus glaberrima Blume; Quercus glomerata Roxb.; Quercus gracilipes Miq.; Quercus grandifolia D.Don; Quercus hystrix var. longispica Gamble; Quercus microcalyx Korth.; Quercus mixta A.DC.; Quercus placentaria Blume; Quercus pseudomolucca Morales ex A.DC.; Quercus racemosa Jack; Quercus rhioensis Hance; Quercus sphacelata Blume; Quercus spicata Sm.; Quercus spicata var. collettii King ex Hook.f.; Quercus spicata var. depressa (Blume) King; Quercus spicata var. glaberrima (Blume) A.DC.; Quercus spicata var. gracilipes (Miq.) A.DC.; Quercus spicata f. gracilipes (Miq.) Miq.; Quercus spicata var. latifolia Scheff.; Quercus spicata var. microcalyx (Korth.) Miq.; Quercus spicata var. placentaria (Blume) Miq.; Quercus spicata var. racemosa Miq.; Quercus squamata Roxb.; Synaedrys pseudomolucca (Morales ex A.DC.) Koidz.; Synaedrys spicata Koidz.

= Lithocarpus elegans =

Species of tree

Lithocarpus elegans is a flowering plant in the beech family Fagaceae. The specific epithet elegans means 'elegant', referring to the acorns and cupules.

== Description ==
Lithocarpus elegans grows as a tree up to 30 m (100 ft) tall with a trunk diameter of up to 70 cm (30 in). The greyish brown bark is fissured or lenticellate. The coriaceous leaves measure up to 17 cm (7 in) long. Its edible brown acorns are ovoid to roundish and measure up to 2.5 cm (1 in) across.

== Distribution and habitat ==
Lithocarpus elegans is native to the eastern Indian subcontinent (Bangladesh, northeastern India, Bhutan and Nepal), Indo-China, and western and central Malesia (Peninsular Malaysia, Singapore, Borneo, Sumatra, Java, and Sulawesi). Its habitat is dipterocarp to lower montane forests up to 1,500 m (5,000 ft) elevation.

== Conservation ==
Lithocarpus elegans has been assessed as least concern on the IUCN Red List. The area in which the species occurs has experienced urban development, conversion of land for agriculture and deforestation. The species is locally harvested. However the species is present in protected areas.

== Uses ==
The timber is used locally as firewood and for charcoal.
