= Pablakhali Wildlife Sanctuary =

- IUCN category II (national park)
- Location within Bangladesh
- Location: Rangamati District, Chittagong Division, Bangladesh
- Nearest city: Rangamati
- Coordinates: 21°40′00″N 92°08′00″E
- Area: 42,087 ha (104,000 acres)
- Established: 1983

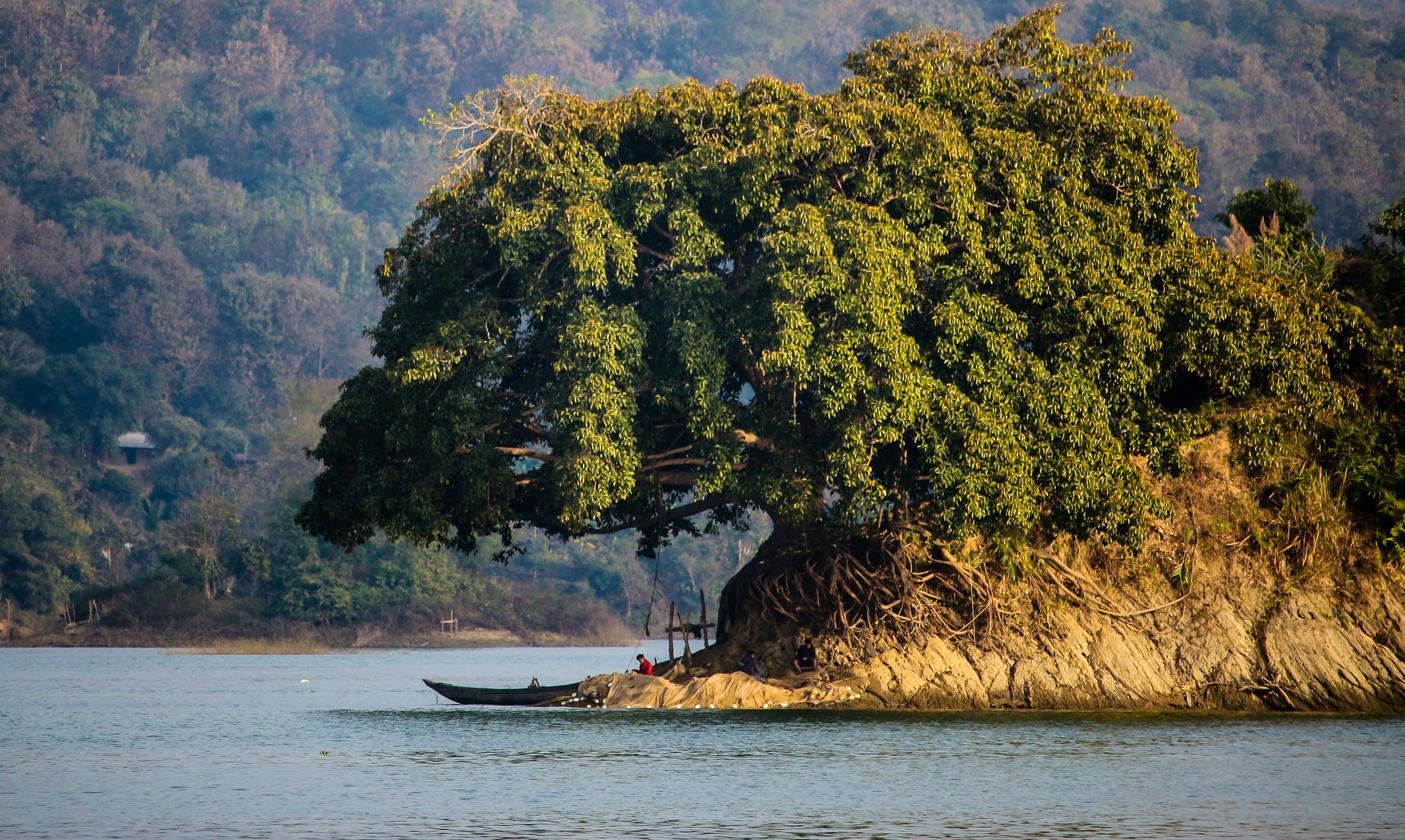
Scenery of Kaptai reservoir

Pablakhali Wildlife Sanctuary (Bengali: পাবলাখালি বন্যপ্রানী সংরক্ষণ অভয়ারন্য) is a wildlife sanctuary at the northern end of the Kaptai reservoir in the Chittagong Hill Tracts region of Bangladesh. The area of the sanctuary is 42,087 ha (104,000 acres), and it is located on the eastern and northern hills of Bangladesh. The nearest town is Rangamati (Bengali: রাঙ্গামাটি which is 112 km (70 mi) from the sanctuary. The western boundary of the sanctuary is formed by the Kassalong River.

== Description ==
The climatic conditions are typically sub-tropical with a dry period from November to May. The mean annual rainfall is 2,500 mm (98 in) with heavy rainfall in the monsoon season of July and August. The sanctuary area is bounded on the southern side by steep rugged hills. The soil is clay in the valley and pale brown to yellow-red (acidic) loam on the hills. A dam at Kaptai (Bengali: কাপ্তাই বাঁধ) was constructed as a part of Karnaphuli hydroelectric project resulting in submergence of a large portion of the sanctuary. Humidity is high throughout the year. The IUCN protected area category is II.

== History ==
Two forest villages of 112 inhabitants were set up in 1950. More recently, a large population of Rohingya have settled inside the sanctuary.

== Biodiversity ==
The sanctuary has a tropical evergreen and semi-evergreen type of forest. It is covered with dense shrubby vegetation with patches of dense forest and bamboos.

=== Flora ===
The forest type is mainly tropical evergreen in the valleys and areas adjoining the rivers and lakes. The tree species growing are mainly Civit (Swintonia floribunda), Garjan (Dipterocarpus turbinatus)., Tula tree (Pterygota alata), Quercus spp. and Castanopsis. The other forest type is tropical moist deciduous. The trees found in this forest type are mainly Dipterocarpus sps; Mangifera indica; Amoora lawii; Cinnamomum sps.; Syzygium cumini; Tetrameles nudiflora; Salmalia malabaricum and Albizia sps. Albizia. The trees are scattered and interspersed with extensive tracts of grassland.

=== Fauna ===
The Indian elephant (Elephas Maximus) is the major threatened species found in the sanctuary. They are mainly restricted to the southern part, where savannas and perennial water bodies support their populations. The other threatened species is Western hoolock gibbon (Hylobates hoolock) and Dhole (Cuon alpines). More common species include Wild boar (Sus scrofa); Rhesus macaque (Macaca mulatta); Capped langur (Presbytis pileata); Indian muntjac (Muntiacus muntjak) and Sambar deer (Cervus unicolor). About 123 species of birds have been reported from the sanctuary. Records describe the presence of Tiger, two species of Rhinoceroses, Wild water buffalo and Gaur in the sanctuary area which have since disappeared.

== Threats ==
Part of the sanctuary is allotted to the settlers from the plains. The major threats are encroachment for cultivation land, removal of forest produce, and tree cutting by local people. The construction of Kaptai dam has also resulted in loss of wildlife in the area.

== See also ==
- List of protected areas of Bangladesh
