= Dudhmukhi Wildlife Sanctuary =

Wildlife sanctuary in Bangladesh

- IUCN category II (national park)
- Location within Bangladesh
- Location: Bagerhat, Khulna, Bangladesh
- Coordinates: 22.094437°N 89.783443°E
- Area: 170 ha (420 acres)
- Established: 29 January 2012

Dudhmukhi Wildlife Sanctuary (Bengali: দুধমুখী বন্যপ্রাণ অভয়ারণ্য) is a wildlife sanctuary located near Sarankhola in Bagerhat District of Bangladesh. The area of the sanctuary is 170 ha (420 acres). It was officially declared as a wildlife sanctuary by the government of Bangladesh on 29 January 2012.

It is one of the safe zones for vultures as per the Vulture Safe Zone-2 Schedule of the government of Bangladesh in 2012. Most of the area of Dudhmukhi consists of wetlands and Dudhmukhi river is one of the dolphin sanctuaries in Bangladesh.

== See also ==
- List of wildlife sanctuaries of Bangladesh
