= Chadpai Wildlife Sanctuary =

Wildlife sanctuary in Bangladesh

- IUCN category II (national park)
- Location within Bangladesh
- Location: Bagerhat, Khulna, Bangladesh
- Coordinates: 22.381607°N 89.656354°E
- Area: 560 ha (1,400 acres)
- Established: 29 January 2012

Chadpai Wildlife Sanctuary (Bengali: চাঁদপাই বন্যপ্রাণ অভয়ারণ্য) is a wildlife sanctuary located near Mongla in Bagerhat District of Bangladesh. The area of the sanctuary is 560 ha (1,400 acres). It was officially declared as a wildlife sanctuary by the government of Bangladesh on 29 January 2012.

It is one of the safe zones for vultures as per the Vulture Safe Zone-2 Schedule of the government of Bangladesh in 2012. Chadpai wetland is one of the dolphin sanctuaries in Bangladesh.

On 9 December 2014 a tanker named OT Southern Star 7 carrying some 357,000 liters furnace oil collided with another vessel and spilled at Mrigmari of Chadpai Wildlife Sanctuary under East Zone of the Sundarbans.

== See also ==
- List of wildlife sanctuaries of Bangladesh
