= Nijhum Dwip National Park =

National park and nature reserve in Bangladesh

Nijhum Dweep National Park
- IUCN category IV (habitat/species management area)
- Location within Chittagong division
- Location: Noakhali District, Chittagong Division, Bangladesh
- Nearest city: Noakhali
- Coordinates: 22°05′35″N 91°00′13.7″E
- Area: 16,352.23 ha (40,407.2 acres)
- Elevation: 16 m (52 ft)
- Established: 2001
- Governing body: Bangladesh Forest Department

Nijhum Dweep National Park (Bengali: নিঝুম দ্বীপ জাতীয় উদ্যান) is a major national park and nature reserve in Bangladesh. The park is located at Hatiya Upazila, Noakhali District in the Southern region of the country. It is located on the banks of the river Meghana. It is also a part of Sunderbans Delta.

Nijhum Dweep National Park covers approximately 16,352 ha (163.52 km^{2}) of mangrove forests biome. The land was declared as national park by the Bangladesh government on 8 April 2001 under the Wildlife Act of 1974.

The waters nearby was declared as the Nijhum Dwip Marine Protected Area in 2019.

== Location ==
It is located 2 km (1.2 mi) south west of Hatiya. The Nijhum Dwip comprises four to five small islands namely Char Osman, Char Kamla, Char Muri and Bellar Char islands. The area is mainly composed of Intertidal mudflats and sand flats. It has a 20 km (12 mi) sandy beach and grassland. The climate is generally humid and warm.

== Plants and animals ==
=== Flora ===
The general walk in the forest is not easy due to muddy soil and pneumatophores of Sonneratia apetala (Keora) and Avicennia alba (Baine) trees. About 152 plant species belonging to 56 families have been recorded. Seven plant species recorded as rare are Bruguiera gymnorhiza (kakra), Derris trifoliata, Diospyros blancoi, Tamarix gallica, Heliotropium currasavicum, Typha elephantina, Sarcolobus carinatus.

=== Fauna ===
The majority of animals found are spotted deer, which can be seen in plenty here. Other animals seen here are small-clawed otter, golden jackal, Water buffalo, monitor lizard, fishing cat, turtles and dolphins. The park is notable because it contains world's largest population of Indian skimmer birds. More than 100 species of migratory and resident birds are recorded in the national park. The water bodies are a major busiest airport for migratory birds. Globally threatened birds like Spoon-billed sandpipers, Asian dowitchers, Nordmann's greenshanks, Spotted redshanks, Goliath herons and Indian skimmers are seen here. The tributaries around the islands are abode to Ganges river dolphins, Indo-Pacific humpback dolphins, Indo-Pacific finless porpoises, and Irrawaddy dolphins. Whales have been spotted occasionally. The channels are very rich in micro benthos and other invertebrates.

== Human settlement ==
There are scanty human habitation inside the National park area. There are 8 thousand inhabitants with fishing and cultivation as major livelihood

Registered forest villagers have certain rights within the reserve. This includes wood collection for fuel and building materials, hunting, betel leaf production, grazing of livestock, harvesting of other forest products, and limited agriculture in allocated land.

== See also ==
- List of protected areas of Bangladesh
- Madhupur tract
- Sundarbans
- Nijhum Dwip
