= Pirojpur Riverview Ecopark =

Eco-Park in Pirojpur

- Pirojpur DC Park
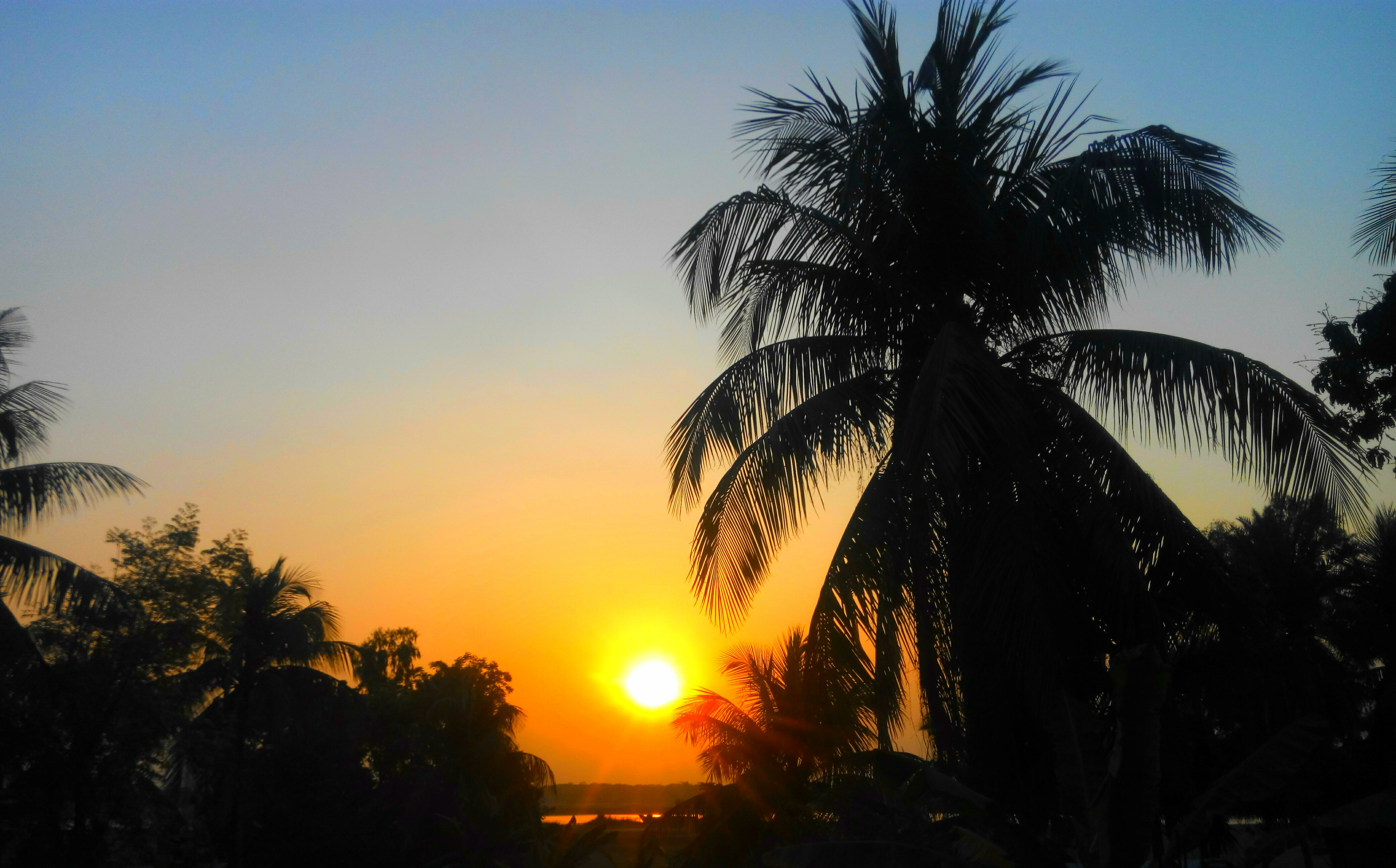
- Interactive map of Pirojpur Riverview Ecopark
- Location: Namazpur, Pirojpur District Sadar
- Area: 2.54 ha (6.3 acres)

Pirojpur Riverview Ecopark (also known as Pirojpur DC Park) is an ecopark located on the banks of the Baleshwar River in Pirojpur District, Bangladesh. It was established in 2010. In 2014, overall responsibility for the park was handed over to the Pirojpur District Commissioner's Office. In 2015, the Forest Department undertook a project to develop the park with funding from the Climate Change Trust Fund.

== Location ==
The ecopark is situated in Namazpur village, about 2.5 kilometers from the Pirojpur District headquarters.

== Description ==
The park was established on 2.54 hectares of land with funding from the Social Forestry Department. In 2007, former Deputy Commissioner Monsur Raja Chowdhury initiated the establishment of the park. The ecopark features artificial waterfalls and small man-made hills. A riverside road runs along the park, and there is a five-story watchtower. It also includes a lake with two wooden bridges over it. The park offers gardens, swings, and various recreational facilities.
