= Tilagar Eco-Park =

- Location within Bangladesh
- Location: Sylhet, Bangladesh
- Nearest city: Sylhet Upazila
- Coordinates: 24.917118°N 91.906730°E
- Area: 112 acres (45 ha)
- Established: 2006
- Governing body: Bangladesh forestry department

Tilagar Eco-Park (Bengali: টিলাগড় ইকোপার্ক), located in Tilagar area of Sylhet district, is the third Eco-park of Bangladesh. This Eco Park has been developed with some hillocks. There is a stream that has passed through the small hills of the Eco-park. hillocks. These hills and hillocks are abounded with many trees which are naturally grown. There are a number of fruit trees as well as the combinations of biodiversity. There are picnic corners available here and Children's Corners for the child. In this evergreen equatorial region, there is also a tea garden namely Lakkhachora Tea Garden and Chevron Gas Field adjacent to the Eco Park.

== location ==
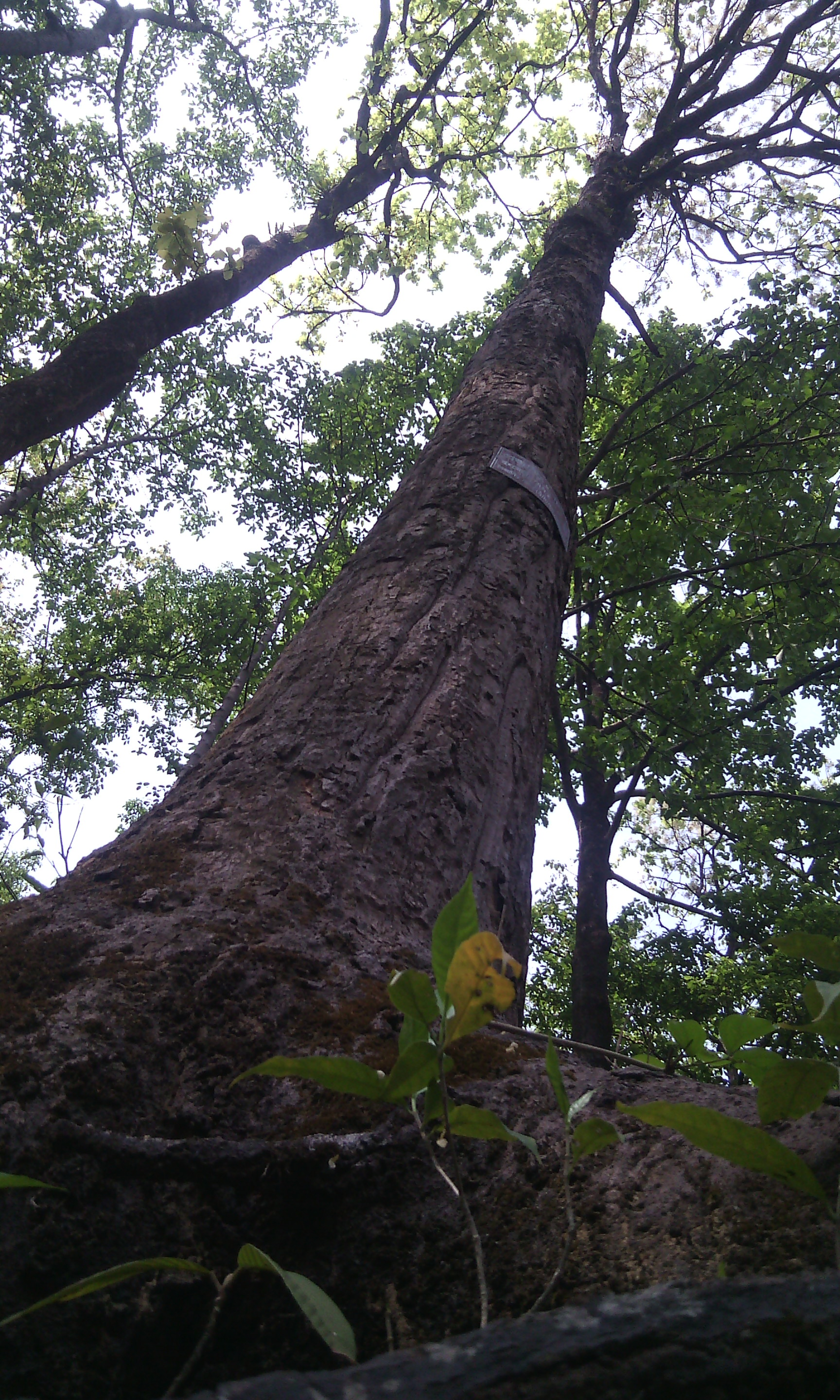
Goran Tree

This ecopark is only 8 kilometres (5.0 mi) away from the north-east corner of Sylhet city. Tilagar Eco-Park is situated on the east side of the city, in a reserve forest near Sylhet Agricultural University and Sylhet Engineering College.

== History ==
Tilagar Eco-Park was established in 2006 with the area of 112 acres of Tilagar Reserve Forest located on the eastern side of Sylhet District. It is an ecopark project of Sylhet Forest Department, Ministry of Environment and Forest.

== Plant diversity ==
This ecopark contains dense forest and various types of natural plants and trees. Among them, there are Artocarpus chaplasha, sal (Shorea robusta), garjan (Rhizophora apiculata), champa flower, jarul (Lagerstroemia speciosa), mangiri, chao, zhao, karai, olive, mango, jackfruit, coconut, betel nut, kamranga, chalata, agar, kishnachura(Delonix regia), Bombax, bajna, Ceylon ironwood or Indian rose chestnut (Mesua ferrea), bakul (Mimusops elengi), hijal (Barringtonia acutangula), fig and Miscellaneous types of cane(Calamus tenuis) are remarkable. Various species of shrubs, herbs and creepy plants have given the park a wonderful look.

== Biodiversity ==
In Tilagar Ecopark, various types of animals are seen in the wild environment. These include foxes, monkeys, jackel, rabbits, moorfowl, pandas, Mathura (Chrysolophus), entellus etc. And Mayna, parakeet, dove, Haridas, and different kinds of birds are available here.
