= Padma Bridge Wildlife Sanctuary =

Protected area in Bangladesh

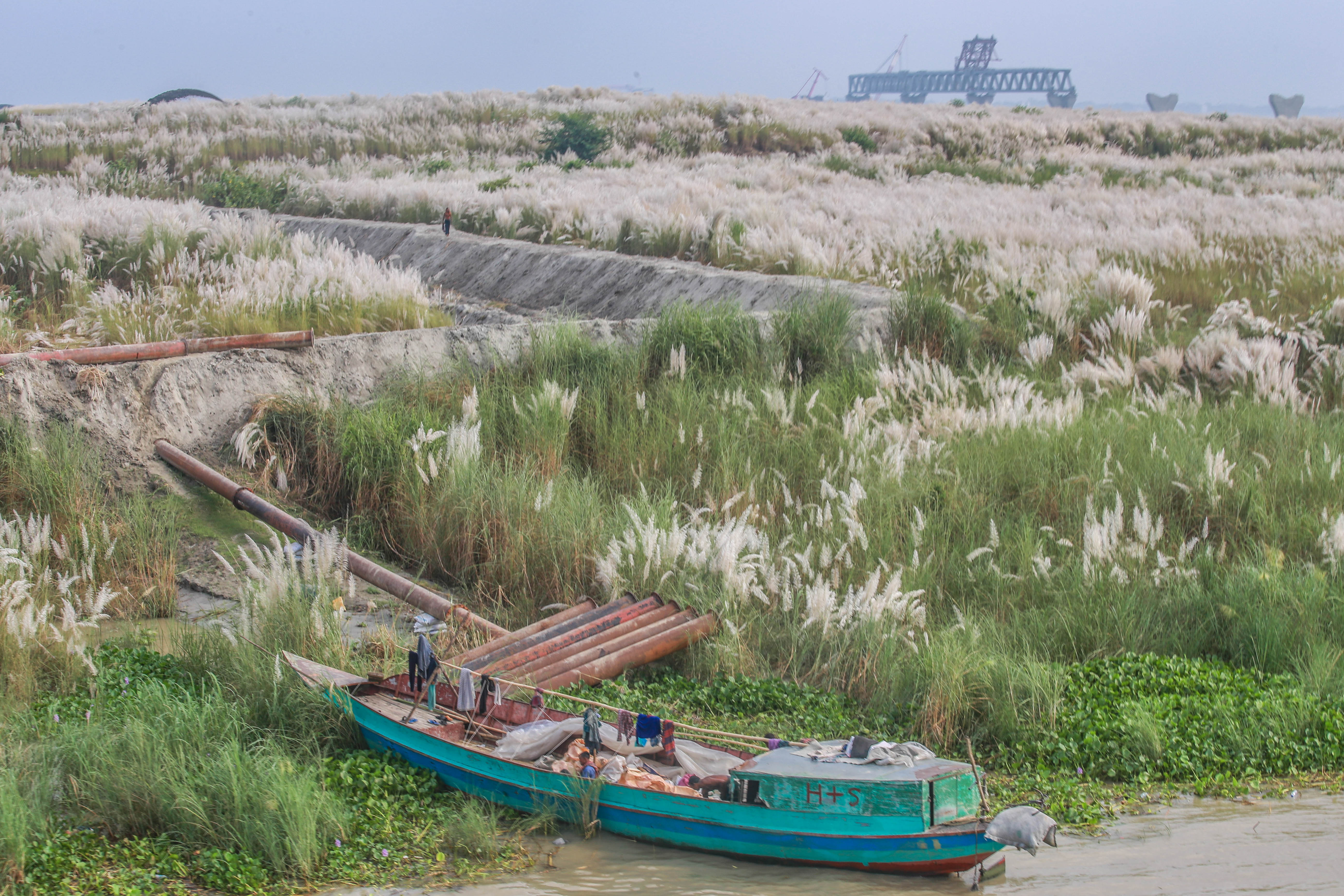
- Wildlife sanctuary beside Padma Bridge

- Location within Bangladesh
- Location: Faridpur District, Munshiganj District, Shariatpur District, Madaripur District, Bangladesh
- Nearest city: Faridpur and Munshiganj
- Coordinates: 23.4443°N 90.2610°E
- Area: 11,772.608 ha (29,090.75 acres)
- Established: 26 November 2020
- Governing body: Bangladesh Forest Department

Padma Bridge Wildlife Sanctuary is an important protected area in Bangladesh, stretching across the Padma River and its surrounding extensive wetlands and terrestrial areas in the south-central part of the country. The sanctuary covers parts of Faridpur District, Munshiganj District, Shariatpur District, and Madaripur District. It was officially declared by the Government of Bangladesh on 26 November 2020 and published in the government gazette on the same day. Its total area is 11,772.608 hectares (approximately 117.72 square kilometres), of which about three-fourths are wetlands and the remaining are terrestrial areas.

== Location and history ==
The sanctuary has been established across the wetlands along the banks of the Padma River and adjacent lands, covering four districts — Faridpur, Munshiganj, Shariatpur, and Madaripur. Among nearby towns, Madaripur and Shariatpur are notable.

It was officially declared and gazetted on 26 November 2020. The total area of the sanctuary is 117.72 square kilometres, with about three-fourths being wetlands and the remaining one-fourth being land. It is divided into two zones: a core area of 81.19 square kilometres and a buffer area of 36.30 square kilometres.

The river and surrounding areas near Padma Bridge have been rich in biodiversity since ancient times. Rare and endangered aquatic species such as the Ganges river dolphin and various native and migratory birds inhabit this area. The sanctuary aims to conserve this unique river-dependent ecosystem, protect wildlife habitats, and strengthen efforts to preserve local and global biodiversity. River course changes, sand extraction, pollution, and human-induced pressures pose significant threats to this ecosystem.

== Biodiversity ==
The Padma Bridge Wildlife Sanctuary is home to a variety of wildlife and plant species. A total of 25 species of mammals, 112 species of birds, 35 species of reptiles, 16 species of amphibians, 89 species of fish, 20 species of butterflies, and 29 species of mollusks and clams have been recorded. In addition, 312 species of plants and vines are found here.

Notable mammals in the area include the Ganges river dolphin, fox, jackal, otter, fishing cat, jungle cat, mongoose, otter, and civet. The bird population comprises a variety of native and migratory species.

| Class | Species |
|---|---|
| Mammals | Ganges river dolphin, fox, jackal, otter, fishing cat, jungle cat, mongoose, otter, civet |
| Birds | Various native and migratory species |
| Reptiles | Monitor lizard, rat snake, spectacled cobra, checkered keelback, banded krait, lizard, garden lizard, water snakes, turtles, tortoises |
| Turtles and tortoises | Ganges softshell turtle, Indian roofed turtle, river terrapin, yellow tortoise |

This rich biodiversity plays an important role in maintaining the ecological balance of the Padma River and its adjacent areas.

=== Conservation challenges ===
Although the sanctuary was established for biodiversity conservation, sand extraction, river course changes, pollution, and human pressures are being seen as threats to the area.
