= Dharmapur National Park =

Nature reserve and national park in Bangladesh

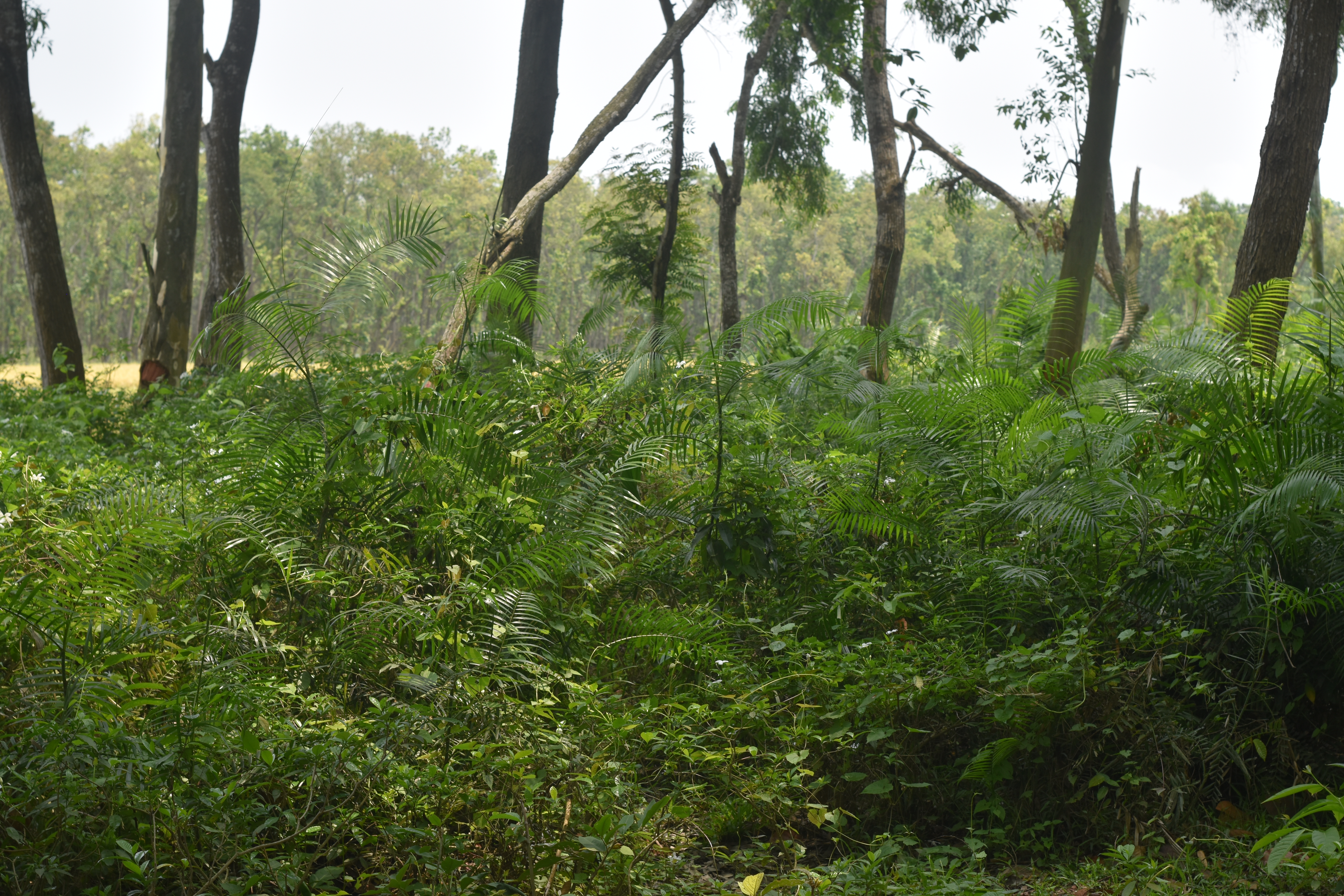
- The Sal forest of Dharmapur National Park

- Location within Bangladesh
- Location: Biral Upazila, Dinajpur District, Bangladesh
- Nearest city: Dinajpur
- Coordinates: 25.539639°N 88.547689°E
- Area: 704.70 ha (1,741.4 acres)
- Established: 24 November 2021

Dharmapur National Park is a protected forest area located in the Dharmapur Union of Biral Upazila in Dinajpur District, northern Bangladesh. It was declared a national park on 24 November 2021. Known for its natural beauty, diverse trees, and rich wildlife, it is considered one of the most important forests in northern Bangladesh. Locally, it is also known as Dharmapur Sal Forest.

== Location and area ==
Dharmapur National Park is located about 8 kilometers west of Dinajpur City, to the south of Biral Upazila, just east of Kaliaganj Bazaar in Dharmapur Union. The park spans across 21 mouzas (revenue villages) and covers an area of about 2,730 acres (704.70 hectares). Two rivers, the Bijra and a 10-kilometer stretch of the Nona River, flow through the forest, adding even more variety to the landscape.

== Biodiversity ==
Dharmapur National Park is best known for its Sal forests. Here are rows of old, dense Sal trees. In addition to Sal, the park has a variety of other trees and plants such as Jamrul, Tarul, Shilkodai, Shimul, Minjiri, Segun, Gamar, Akashmoni, Ghoranim, Sonalu, Gutijam, Haritaki, Boyra, Amloki, Devdaru, Aparajita, Bet, Agar, and Khejur. There are also thickets of bamboo and cane scattered throughout the forest.

The forest is home to more than fifty species of birds, as well as animals such as jungle cats, jackals, mongooses, foxes, rabbits, snakes, and vultures. In the past, tigers, bears, and nilgai could also be found here, but now they are nearly extinct in this area. The forest is especially enchanting because of the many birds, particularly the melodious calls of doves.

== Tourism and conservation ==
Dharmapur National Park is a favorite destination for visitors because of its scenic beauty and peaceful surroundings. Winding paved roads, rows of Sal trees, open skies, and the shade from various trees make walking through the forest a memorable experience. During the COVID-19 pandemic, the forest was able to recover some of its natural environment, and as a result, the number of animals and plants increased slightly. According to local residents, turning the area into a national park has created new opportunities for nature and biodiversity conservation. At the same time, it has opened up new sources of employment and tourism income for the local community.

Dharmapur Forest was once much denser and rich in wildlife. However, land grabbing and illegal logging have led to the shrinking of the forest and loss of biodiversity. To protect the forest and its wildlife, the government took steps to designate it as a national park. Currently, forest conservation activities are ongoing in coordination with the local community, the Forest Department, and the local administration.

== See also ==
- List of protected areas of Bangladesh
