= Tengragiri Wildlife Sanctuary =

Wildlife sanctuary in Bangladesh

Tengragiri Eco Park
- IUCN category II (national park)
- Location within Bangladesh
- Location: Barguna, Barisal, Bangladesh
- Coordinates: 21.9635°N 89.9643°E
- Area: 4,048.58 ha (10,004.3 acres)
- Established: 24 October 2010

Tengragiri Eco Park (Bengali: টেংরাগিরি ইকো পার্ক) is a wildlife sanctuary located near Taltali in Barguna District of Bangladesh. The sanctuary is locally known as Fatrarban. The area of the sanctuary is 4,048.58 ha (10,004.3 acres).

The forest was given the name Tengragiri in 1967 and during that time it covered an area of estimated 13,644 acres. It was declared as a reserved forest by the then Pakistan government on 12 July 1960 based on the survey conducted in the area during the British period in 1927. The area was officially declared as a wildlife sanctuary by the government of Bangladesh on 24 October 2010.

== See also ==
- List of wildlife sanctuaries of Bangladesh
