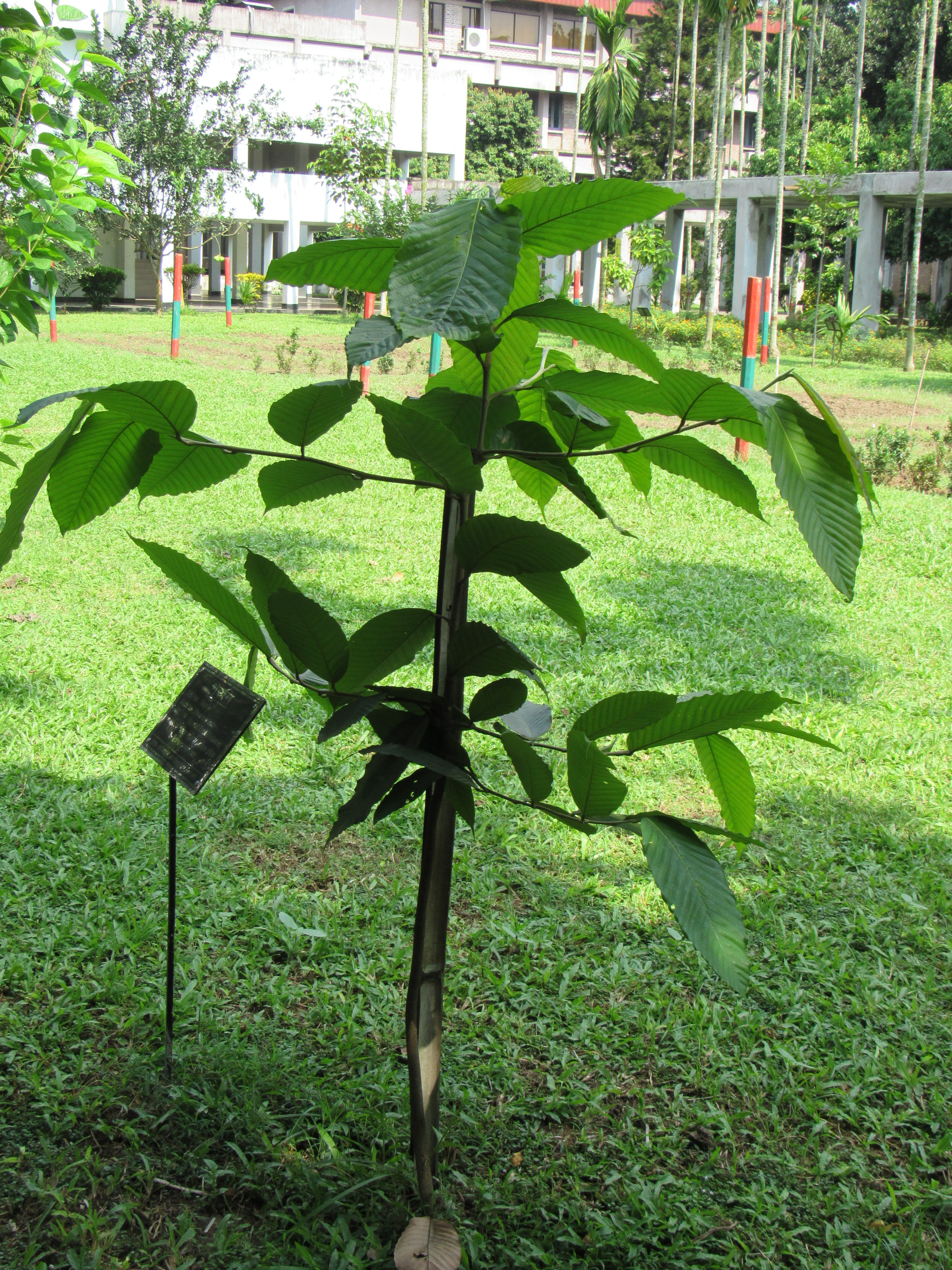

Conservation status
- Vulnerable (IUCN 3.1)

Scientific classification
- Kingdom: Plantae
- Clade: Tracheophytes
- Clade: Angiosperms
- Clade: Eudicots
- Clade: Rosids
- Order: Malvales
- Family: Dipterocarpaceae
- Genus: Dipterocarpus
- Species: D. turbinatus

Binomial name
- Dipterocarpus turbinatus C.F.Gaertn.

Synonyms
- Dipterocarpus jourdanii Pierre; Dipterocarpus laevis Buch.-Ham.; Dipterocarpus mayapis (Blanco) Blanco; Mocanera mayapis Blanco

= Dipterocarpus turbinatus =

Species of flowering plant

Dipterocarpus turbinatus, commonly known as gurjan or gurjun, is a species of tree in the family Dipterocarpaceae, native to north-eastern India and mainland Southeast Asia, and cultivated in surrounding regions. It is an important source of the wood known as keruing, and is often used in the plywood industry.

== Distribution ==
Dipterocarpus turbinatus is native to an area from India (Arunachal Pradesh, Assam, Manipur, Meghalaya, Tripura, Andaman Islands, Nicobar Islands), Bangladesh, Myanmar, Thailand, Peninsular Malaysia, Borneo, Cambodia, Laos to Vietnam. It is cultivated in Indonesia (Sumatra, Java, Kalimantan), Philippines, and China (southeast Tibet, southern & western Yunnan).

== Description ==
The trees of D. turbinatus are lofty, growing 30–45 m (98–150 ft) tall. The bark is gray or dark brown, and is shallowly longitudinally fissured and flaky. Branchlets are glabrescent. The leaf buds are falcate, with both buds and young twigs densely gray and puberulous. The stipules are 2–6 cm (0.8–2 in), densely, shortly dark grayish or dark yellow puberulous; the petiole is 2–3 cm (0.8–1 in), densely gray puberulous or glabrescent; the leaf blade is ovate-oblong, 20–30 cm (7.9–12 in) by 8–13 cm (3.1–5.1 in), leathery, glabrous or sparsely stellate pubescent, lateral veins are in 15 to 20 pairs conspicuously raised abaxially, base rounded or somewhat cordate, margin entire or sometimes sinuate, apex acuminate or acute. The racemes are axillary, with 3 to 6 flowers. Calyx segments are 2 linear, 3 shorter, all glabrous, outside glaucous. The stamens are about 30; anthers linear-lanceolate; connective appendages filiform. The ovary is densely pubescent; style terete, silvery gray tomentose on lower half. The nut is ovoid or narrowly ovoid, densely appressed tomentose; the calyx tube is up to 2.8 cm (1.1 in) in diameter, glabrous, and glaucous; the winglike calyx segments are linear-lanceolate, 12–5 cm (5–2 in) by ca. 3 cm (1 in), glabrous, minutely papillate near much-ramified solitary midvein. Flowering is from March to April, and fruiting occurs in June and July.

== Habitat and status ==
It is found in mixed deciduous, evergreen and semievergreen forests. In Cambodia, one description of the habitats is wet, dense forest, sometimes on sandy, clayey soils, sometimes on red soils. The conservation status is based on the rate of habitat loss, the major threat for the species, though some subpopulations are protected in reserves.

The resin of the tree (known internationally as East Indian copaiba balsam) is used in India, where it is the source of kanyin oil and gurjun oil, and in Cambodia, where the almost solid resin is especially used to prepare torches. The red brown wood has use documented for India, Cambodia and Yunnan, China. In Cambodia, the wood is popular for sawing, woodwork, and tea-cabinet work. In herbal medicine, the plant has been traditionally used for treating gonorrhea, leprosy, psoriasis, and other skin diseases. In the home gardens of South China, it is cultivated both as a medicinal and as a perfume plant.
