= Rema-Kalenga Wildlife Sanctuary =

Wildlife sanctuary in Bangladesh

- রেমা–কালেঙ্গা
- IUCN category IV (habitat/species management area)
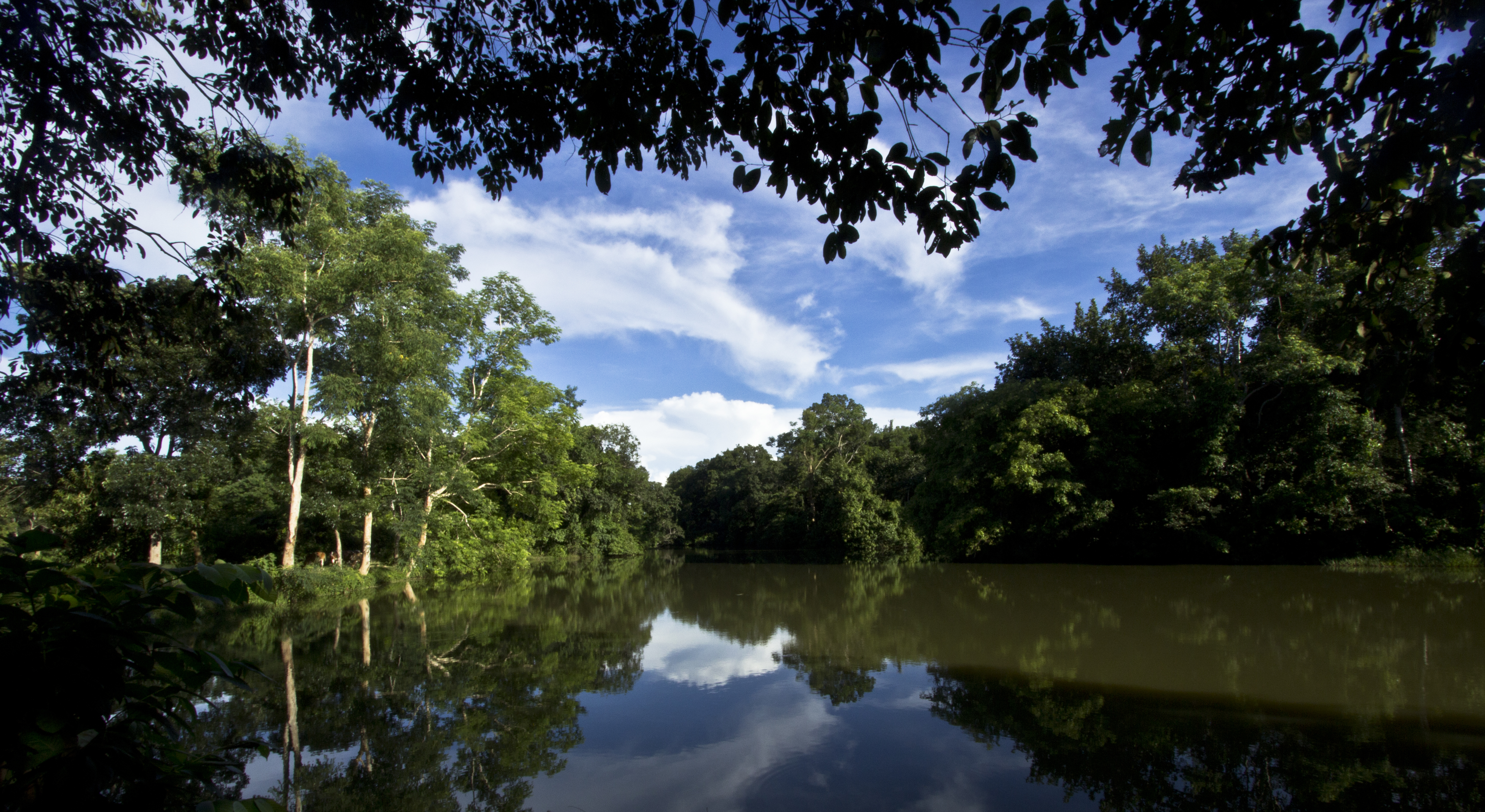

- Location within Bangladesh
- Location: Habiganj District, Bangladesh
- Nearest city: Habiganj
- Coordinates: 24°10′53″N 91°38′13″E
- Area: 17.96 km^{2} (6.93 sq mi)
- Established: 1982

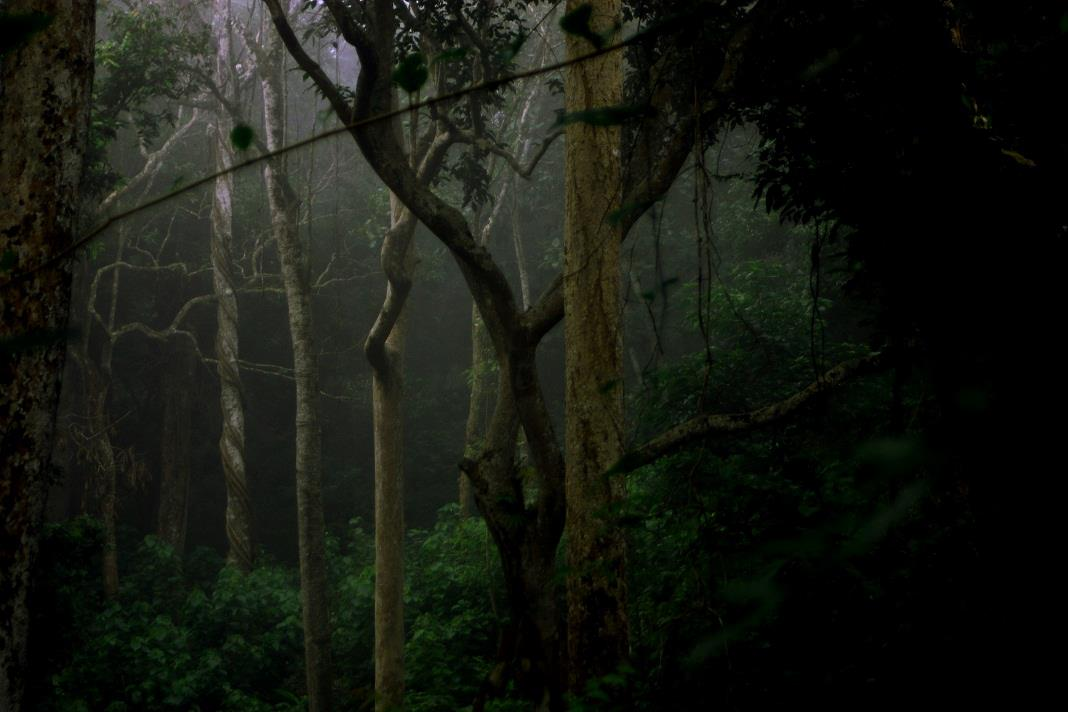

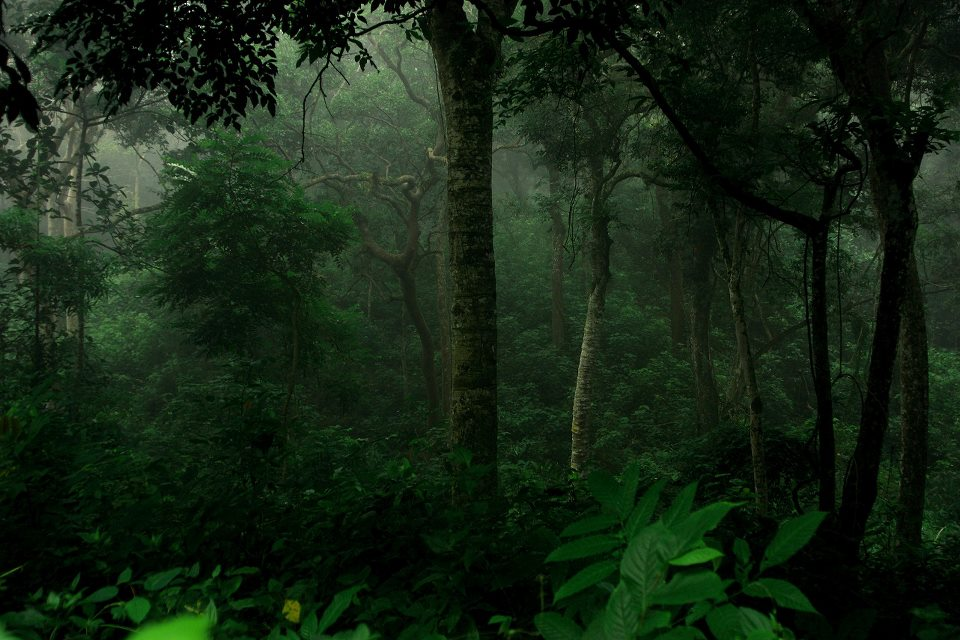

Rema-Kalenga Wildlife Sanctuary is a protected forest and wildlife sanctuary in Bangladesh. This is a dry and evergreen forest . It is located in the Chunarughat of Habiganj district. Rema-Kalenga Wildlife Sanctuary was established in 1982 and later expanded in 1996. Currently the wildlife sanctuary expands on an area of 1795.54 hectares as of 2009. This is one of the natural forests in Bangladesh that are still in good condition. However, indiscriminate theft of trees and deforestation pose threats to the sanctuary.

== Geography ==
Rema-Kalenga Wildlife Sanctuary is located in Chunarughat upazila of Habiganj. It is near Srimangal of Moulvibazar district and adjacent to the Tripura border of India. The wildlife sanctuary is about 130 kilometers north-east of the capital Dhaka. It comprises four bits of Kalenga Forest Range of Habiganj District namely: Kalenga, Rema, Chanbari and Rashidpur.

== Biodiversity ==
Rema-Kalenga Wildlife Sanctuary is rich in rare species of plants and animals. The forest holds 37 species of mammals, 167 species of birds, seven species of amphibian, 18 species of reptiles and 638 species of plants. It is well known for a variety of birds, including racket-tailed drongos, hill mynas, red-headed trogons, red-whiskered bulbuls, white-rumped vultures, Kalij pheasants and red jungle fowl. The sanctuary has been designated an Important Bird Area (IBA) by BirdLife International because it supports significant populations of many bird species.

Significant wildlife includes capped langur, Phayre's langur, western hoolock gibbon, Indian leopard, Asian golden cat, leopard cat, hog badger, wild boar and barking deer. There are five species of squirrel. Among the reptiles, Burmese pythons, green pit vipers and various other snakes and lizards can be found.

According to the locals, tigers and leopards were common back in the 1960s but, since 1971, there have been no certain tiger sightings. There are occasional reports of leopards, though these may be of stray individuals from the bordering Indian forest. Dholes have been locally extinct since the 1990s. At present, small wildcats and jackals are the main terrestrial predators of the forest.
