= Forest Department (Bangladesh) =

Government agency of Bangladesh

- বন অধিদপ্তর
- Formation: 1870
- Headquarters: Dhaka, Bangladesh
- Region served: Bangladesh
- Official language: Bengali
- Website: Forest Department

Forest Department (Bengali: বন অধিদপ্তর) is a government agency responsible for the protection and maintenance of forests and wildlife in Bangladesh. Its head office is located in Mohakhali, Dhaka, Bangladesh.

== History ==
The forest department was established in 1870 during the British Raj era. Originally established to look after natural forests, the department started social forestation in the 1980s. The department is also responsible for National Botanical Garden of Bangladesh, Forestry Development and Training Centre, Kaptai, and to Bangladesh Forest College. The total amount of forest land under the management of the department is 3.617 million acres. In the 1950s and 1960s, the department planted Sal, Dhaka, Tangail, and Mymensingh of Dhaka division. The department also planted Tendu in Dinajpur. In the 1980s, the department planted trees in coastal areas for protection against cyclones and tides. The department planted trees along roads, canals, and railways tracks which totaled 94,000 km.

== Corruption ==
- Shariatpur Forest Department was charged with a gathering portion of land to created a cantonment near Padma Multipurpose Bridge to house the 99th Composite Brigade. The department in collaboration with a syndicate made false estimations of values of tree on the land and built fake houses to increase the cost of land acquisition for the government.
