= List of beaches in Bangladesh =

Bangladesh, with a sea border extending about 1320 kms, including all the islands and the estuary facing the Bay of Bengal, claims to have the world's longest sea beach at Cox's Bazar, measuring at 120 km (75 miles) of unbroken sea beach, with a view of sunrise and sunset and a unique coral sea beach. Below is a list of sea beaches located in Bangladesh.

== Sea beaches in Chittagong Division ==
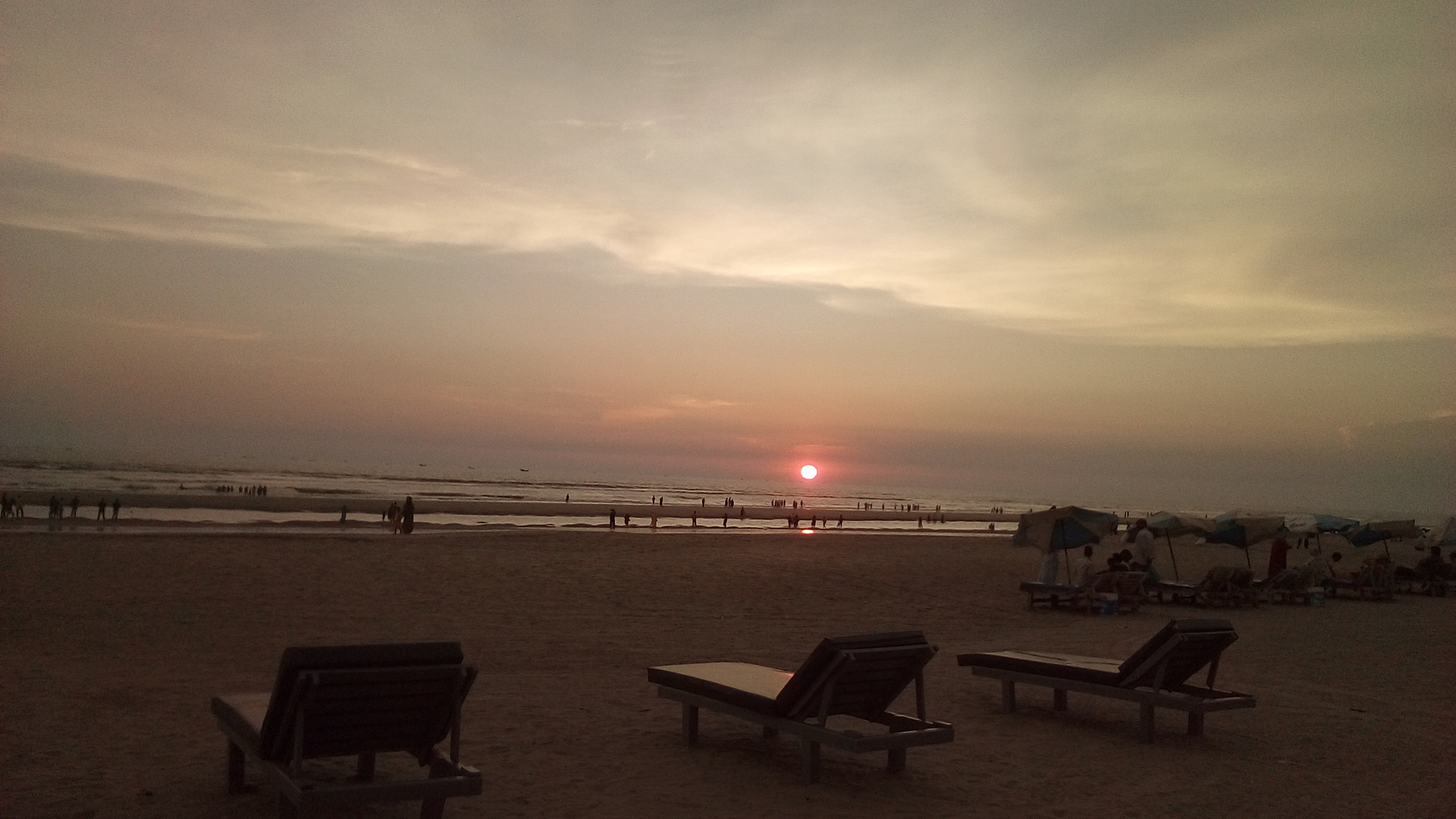
Cox's Bazar, Bangladesh

=== Chandpur District ===
- Mini Cox's Bazar

=== Chittagong District ===
- Akilpur Beach
- Banshbaria Beach
- Banshkhali Beach
- Guliakhali Beach
- Kattali Beach
- Parki Beach
- Patenga Beach

=== Cox's Bazar District ===
- Cox's Bazar Beach
- Kutubdia Beach
- Inani Beach
- St. Martin's Island
- Teknaf Beach
- Sonadia Beach

=== Noakhali District ===
- Nijhum Dip

== Sea beaches in Khulna Division ==
=== Khulna District ===
- Kotka Beach

=== Satkhira District ===
- Mandarbaria Beach

== Sea beaches in Barisal Division ==
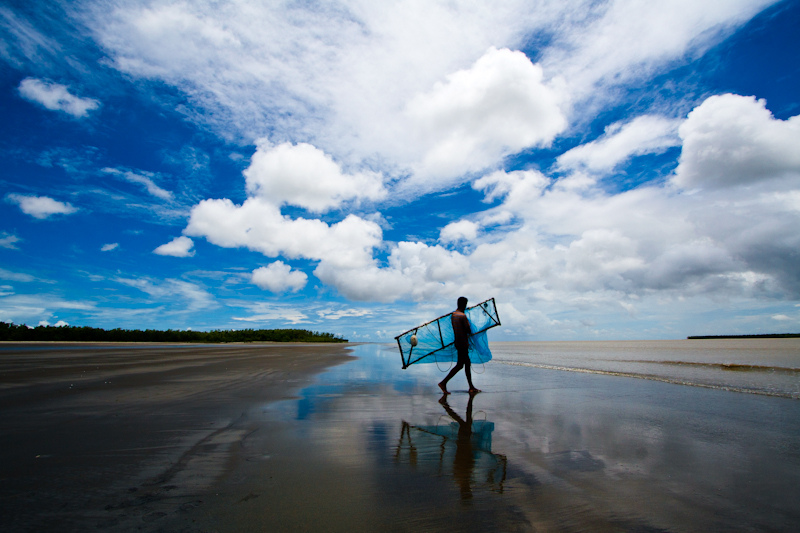
A view of Kuakata Beach

=== Barguna District ===
- Laldia Beach
- Shuvo Sondha Beach

=== Bhola District ===
- Tarua Beach

=== Patuakhali District ===
- Jahajmara Beach
- Kuakata Beach

== See also ==
- List of beaches
