= Jahajmara Beach =

Beach located in Rangabali Upazila, Bangladesh

Jahajmara
- Beach
- Coordinates: 21.8494269°N 90.3404354°E
- Location: Maudubi Union, Rangabali, Patuakhali, Barisal
- Offshore water bodies: Bay of Bengal

Dimensions
  - Length: 5 km

Jahajmara Sea Beach is a beach located in Rangabali Upazila, Patuakhali District, in the Barisal Division of Bangladesh.

== History ==
Previously, the Jahajmara area was known as Charbogla. According to locals, Jahajmara used to be an international shipping route. During the British period, a foreign ship became stranded here and gradually sank into silt. The wreck was still visible after the independence of Bangladesh, attracting visitors to the area. Over time, the spot developed into a tourist destination. The name "Jahajmara" (literally "struck ship") originated from this incident.

== Location ==
The beach lies on the coast of the Bay of Bengal, about 20 km south of Rangabali Upazila headquarters in Patuakhali District. It is about 30 km away from Kuakata Sea Beach.

== Natural beauty ==
From anywhere on the beach, both sunrise and sunset can be observed closely. Red crabs scuttling on the sand, waves crashing on the shore, and rows of fishing boats swaying with the tide create a captivating view. Visitors can also watch local fishermen at work and taste fresh fish directly from the sea. Every winter, migratory birds add to the attraction. Surrounding the area is about 500 acres of forest with keora, soila, gewa, babla, and various species of birds, giving the impression of a lush green woodland.

== See also ==
- List of beaches in Bangladesh
