= Banshbaria Beach =

Beach in Bangladesh

Banshbaria Sea Beach
- Beach
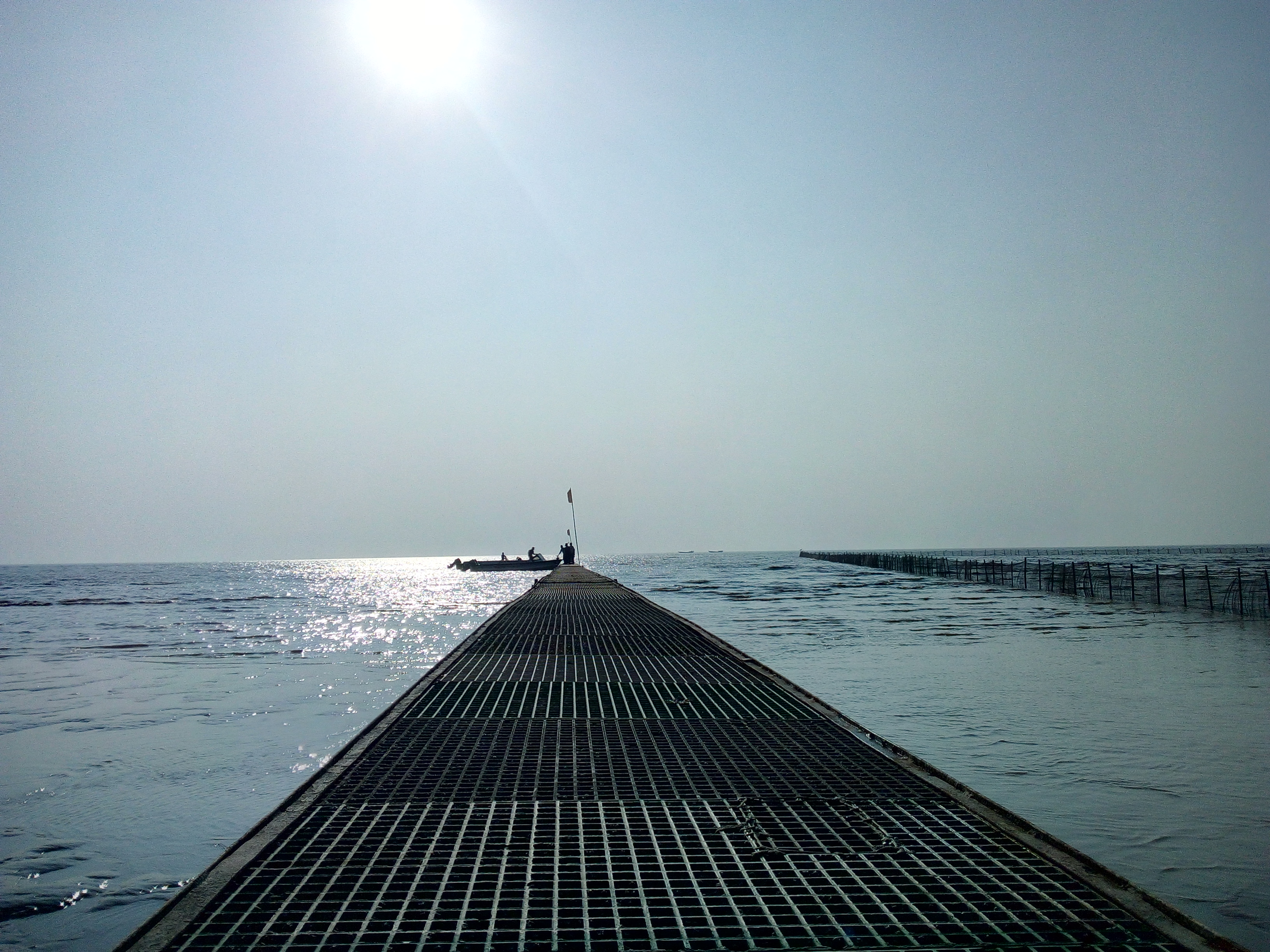
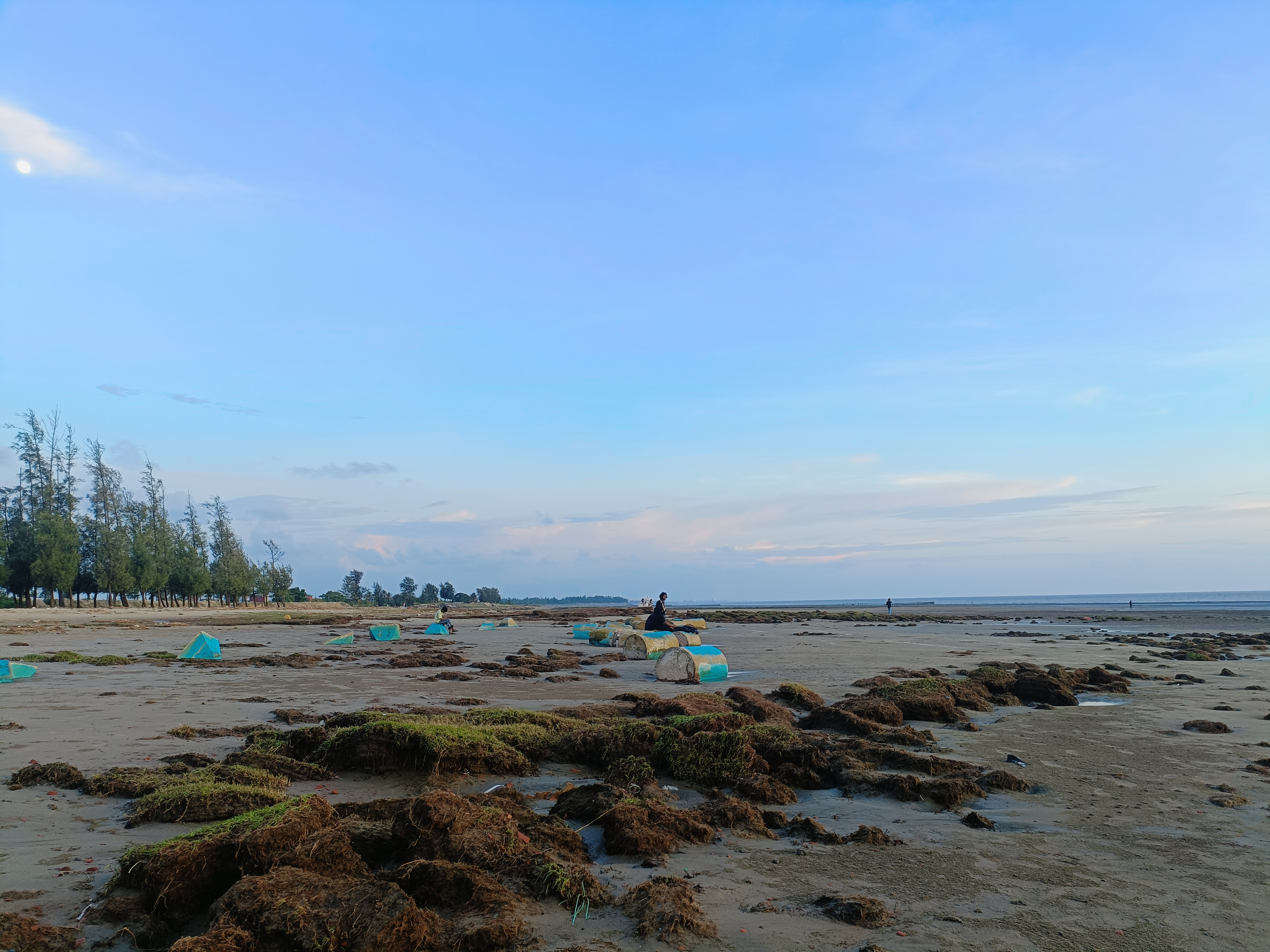
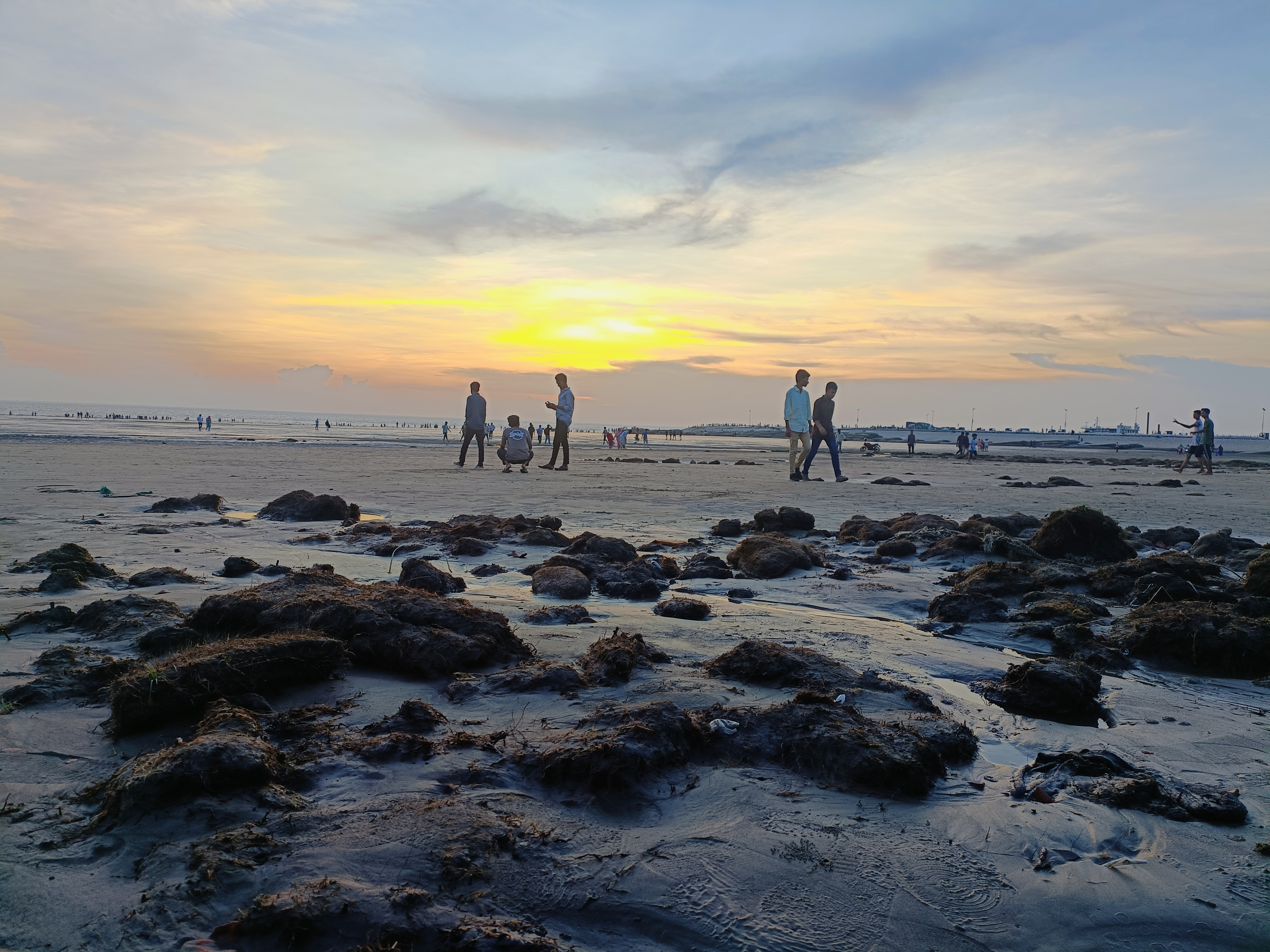
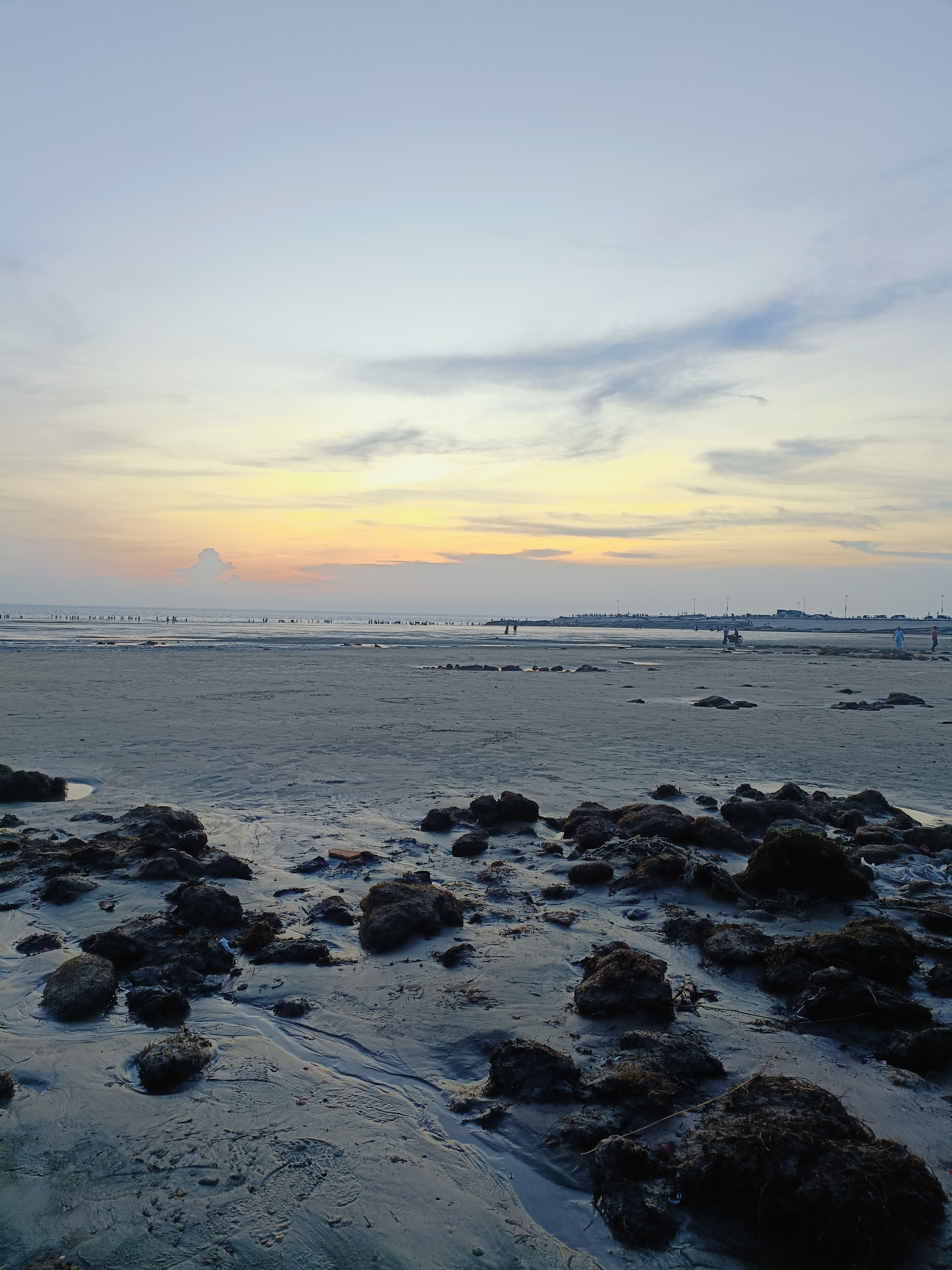
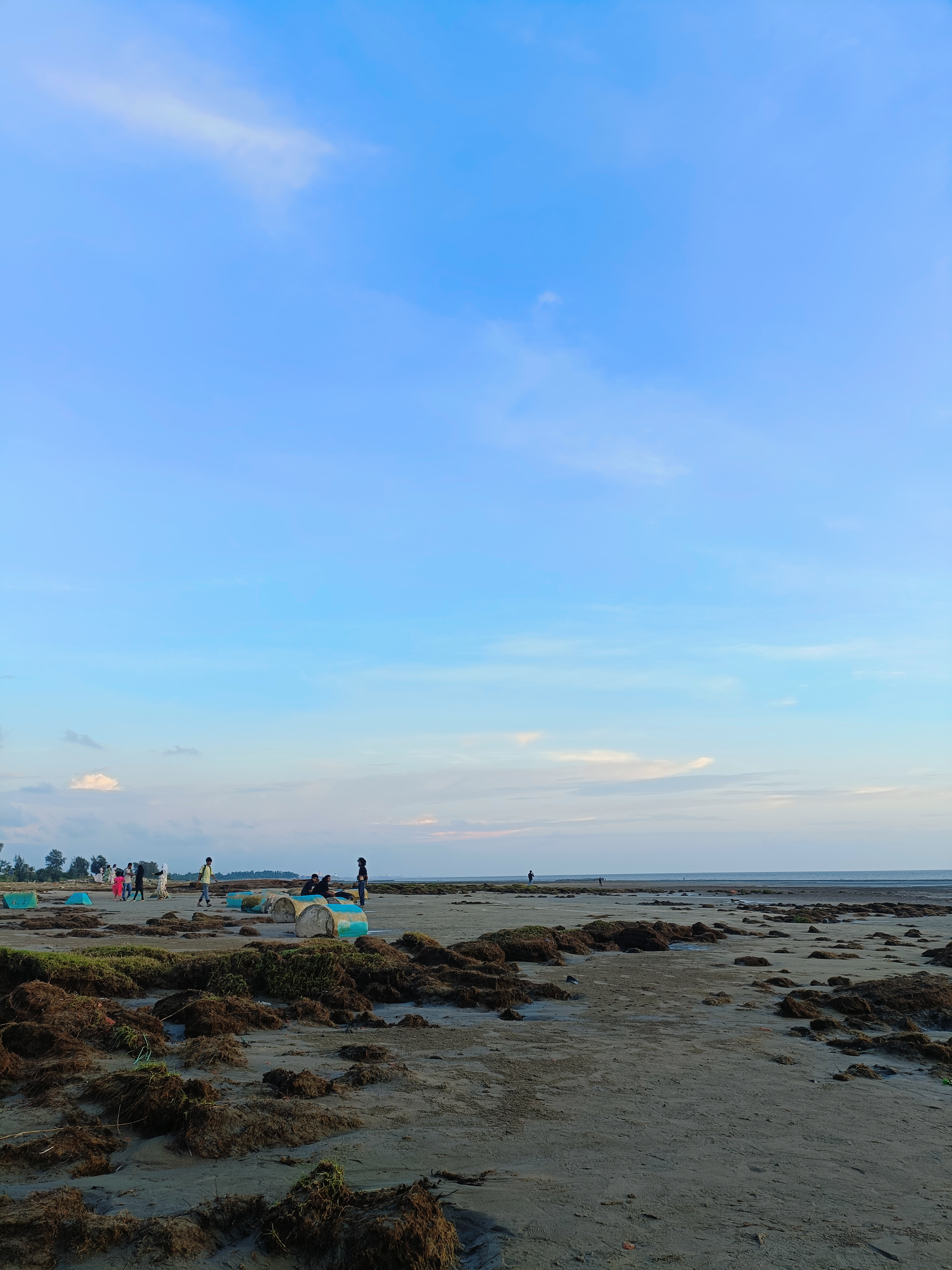
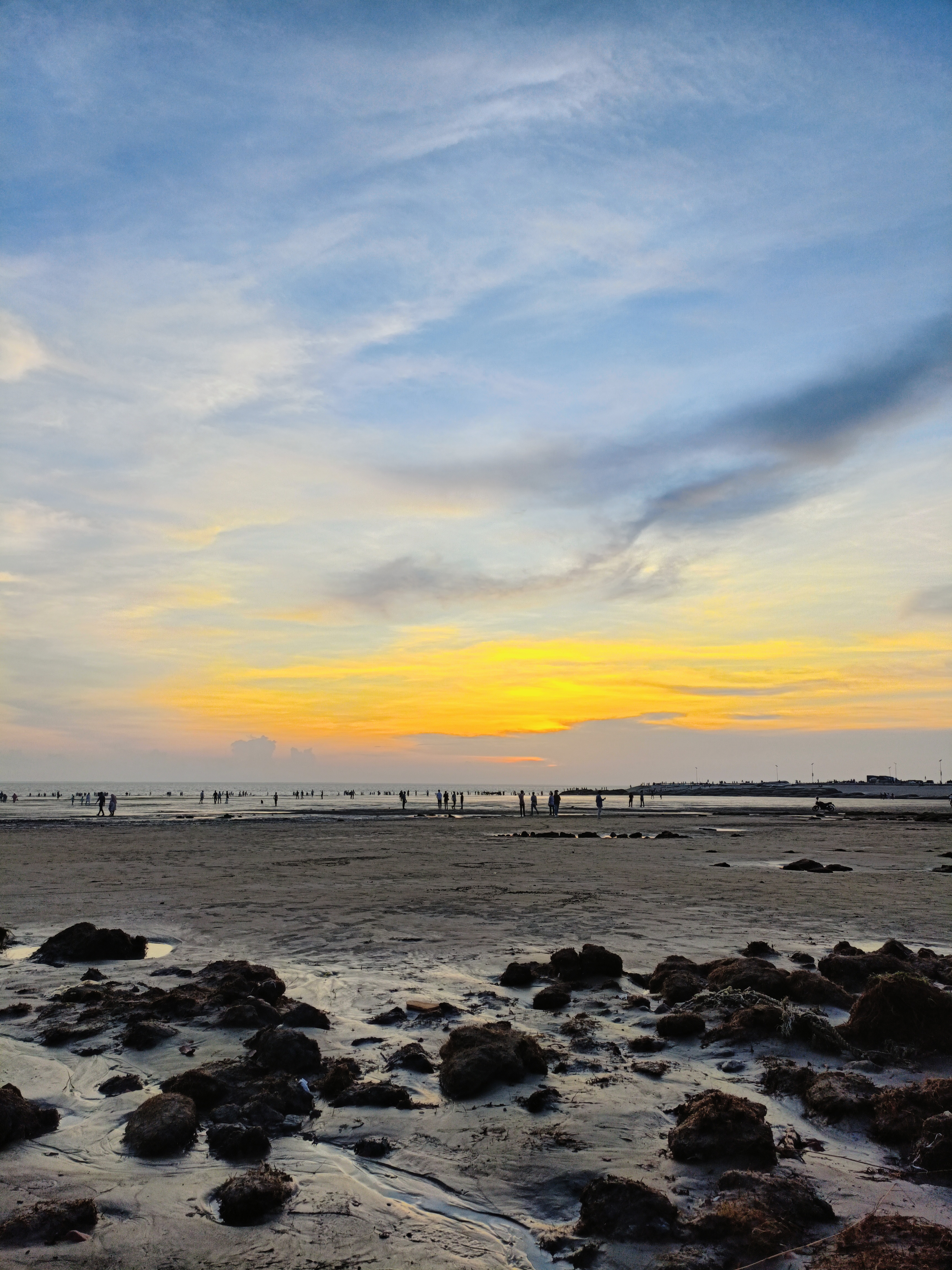
- Clockwise top: Small bridge in 2017 connects the land with sea, sunset pictures of the beach in 2025
- Location: Bangladesh, Chittagong, Chittagong

Dimensions
  - Length: 5 km (3.1 mi)

Banshbaria Sea Beach is located in Banshbaria Union of Sitakunda Upazila, Bangladesh. It is situated about 9 kilometers from Sitakunda town.

== History ==
In 2009, a local political leader named Kashem Raja took the initiative to develop this beach and promoted it. Since then, the beach started gaining recognition. However, it became most popular in 2017, when some students of University of Chittagong visited the beach and shared photos and videos on social media. More tourists began to arrive after that. At present, many tourists visit the beach daily.

== Ferry terminal ==
On 24 March 2025, a ferry service was launched from Banshbaria to Sandwip. For this purpose, a 700-metre-long approach road was constructed in the beach area for ferry access. The ferry terminal is operated by the Bangladesh Inland Water Transport Authority (BIWTA). A fee of 10 taka per passenger has been fixed, while vehicle charges vary. Every day, thousands of visitors gather the area just to see this connecting road. There are lots of speedboats are available in this terminal to go Sandwip Island but the fare is a little bit higher than usual. By speedboat, it takes only 20-25 minutes to reach Sandwip Island while all other transport systems take a longer period of time.

== Accidents ==
Due to lack of proper maintenance, the beach is not very safe for tourists, and accidents occur almost every year. On 21 June 2018, two students went missing while visiting the beach. On 6 July of the same year, three members of the same family also went missing. For this reason, the district administration declared the beach restricted. However, the restriction has not yet been enforced.

== See also ==
- List of beaches in Bangladesh
