= Kattali Beach =

Beach located in Chittagong, Bangladesh

Kattali Sea Beach
- Beach
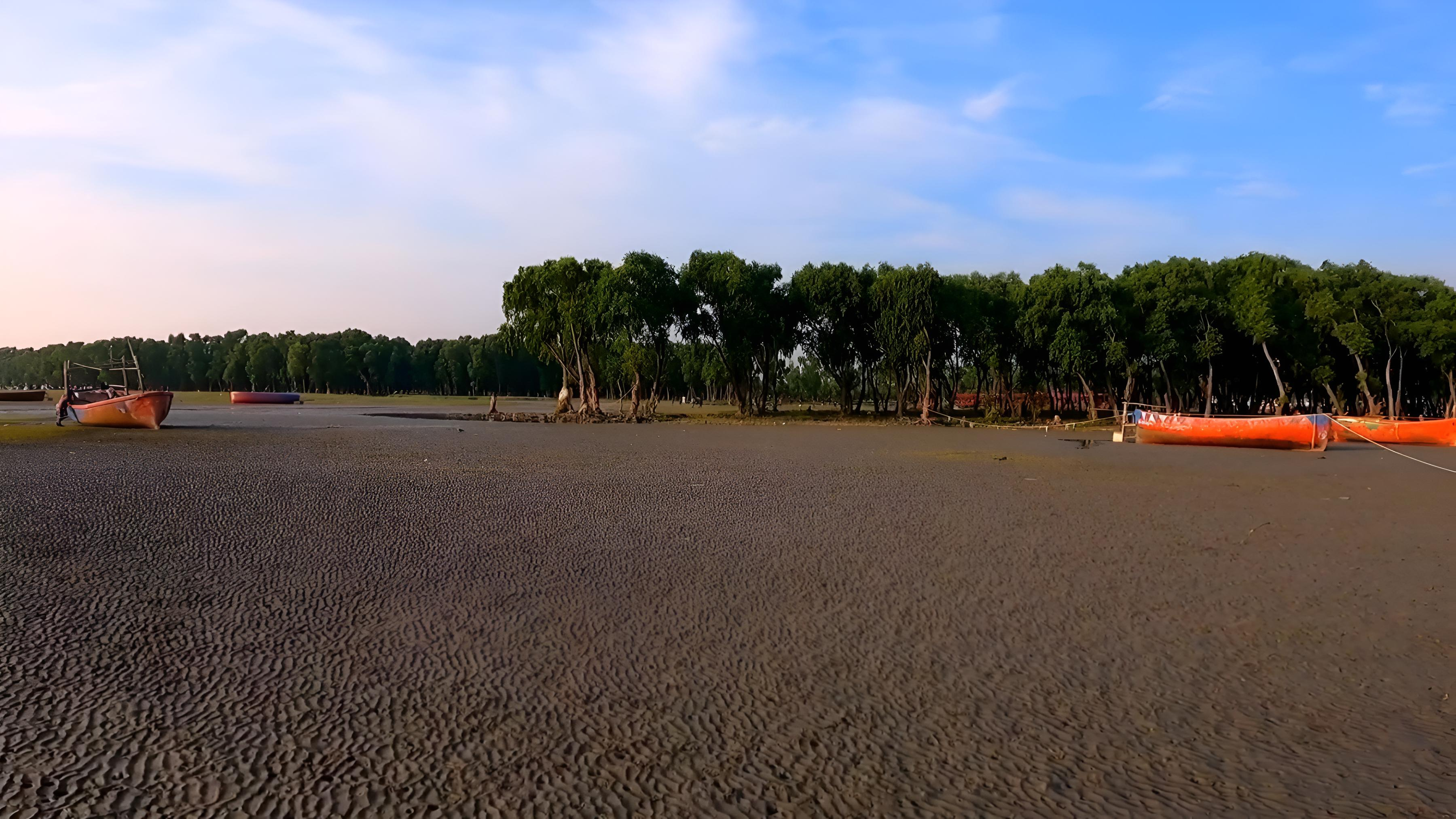
- Coordinates: 22.360°N 91.755°E
- Location: Chittagong, Bangladesh

Kattali Sea Beach is a little-known but very scenic beach located in Chittagong, Bangladesh. It is situated about 8 kilometers from Chittagong city, beside Zohur Ahmed Chowdhury Stadium in Pahartali Thana. Locally, it is also called Jele Para Sea Beach or Jailla Para. The beach is popular for its tranquil environment, mangrove forest, and the lifestyle of local fishermen.

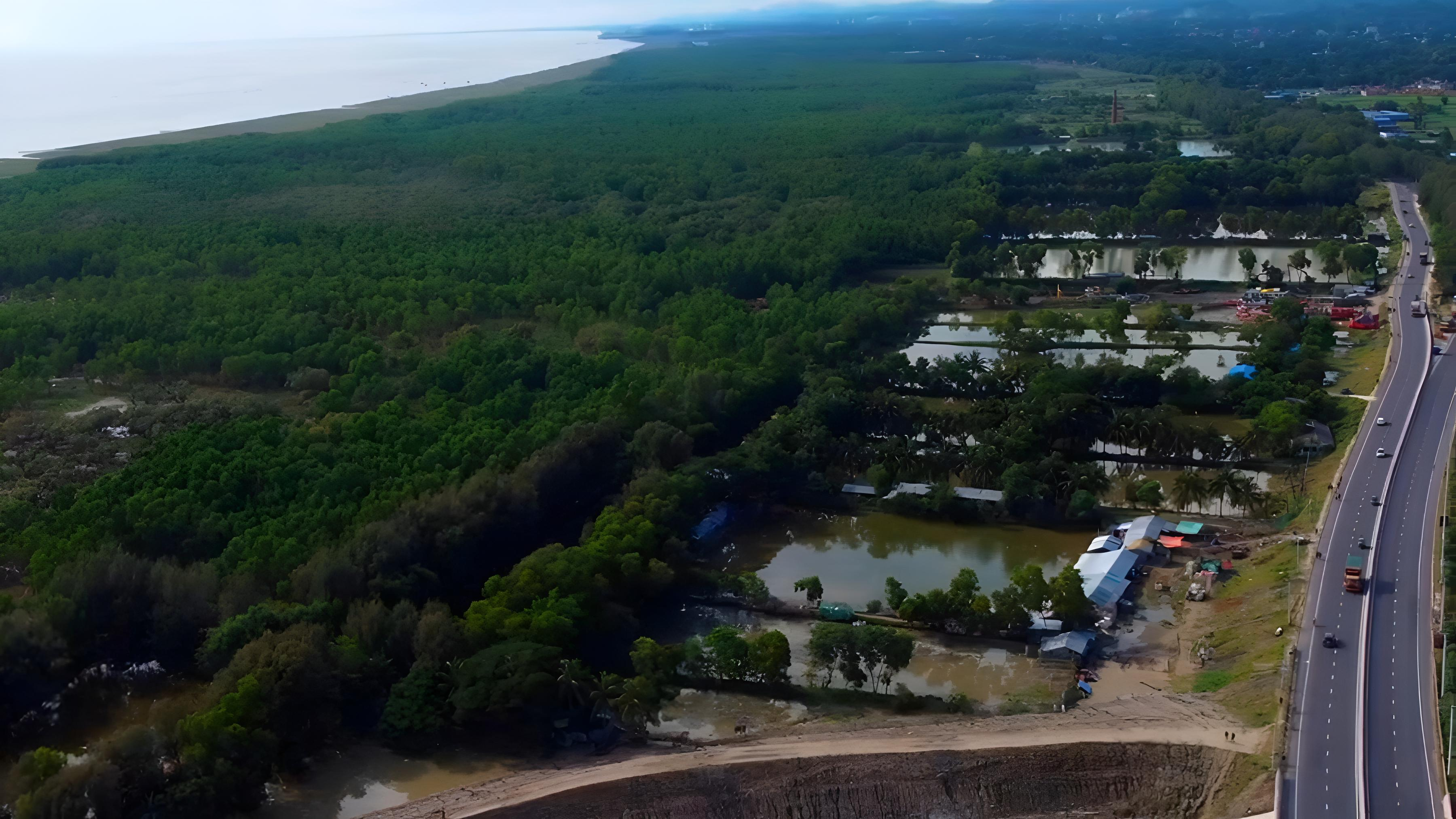
Kattali Sea Beach

== Description ==
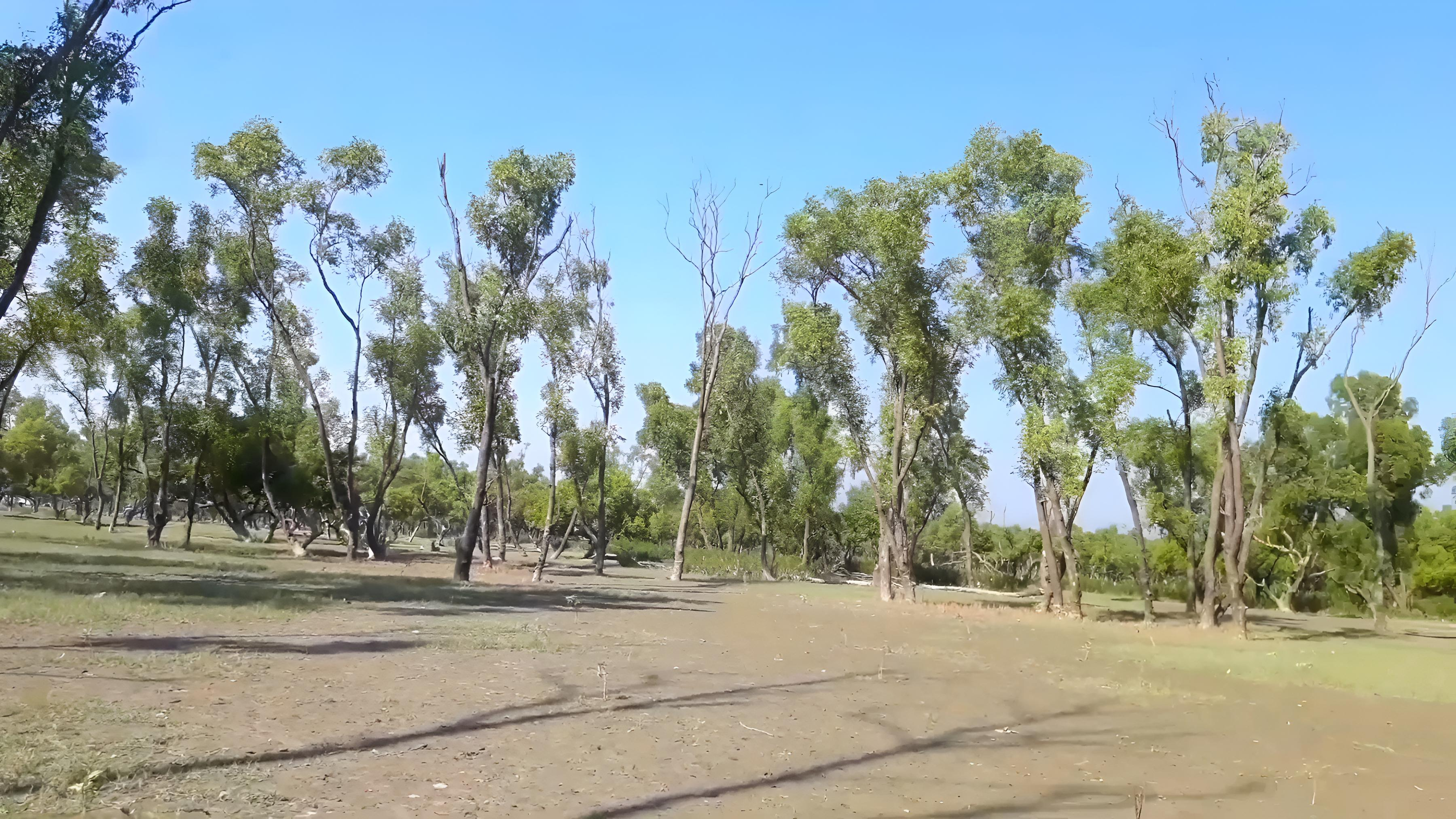
Kattali Sea Beach

Kattali Sea Beach is a relatively quiet beach where the vastness of the sea, the greenery of nature, and the lifestyle of fishermen blend together. Compared to other sea beaches, it is less commercialized, allowing the natural scenic beauty to be felt more vividly. Alongside the beach are several fish markets (such as Machhpotty, Ilishghat, and Ranighat Fish Market), where fishermen sell fish every day. During the monsoon season, the view of the beach becomes even more enchanting.

== Attractions ==
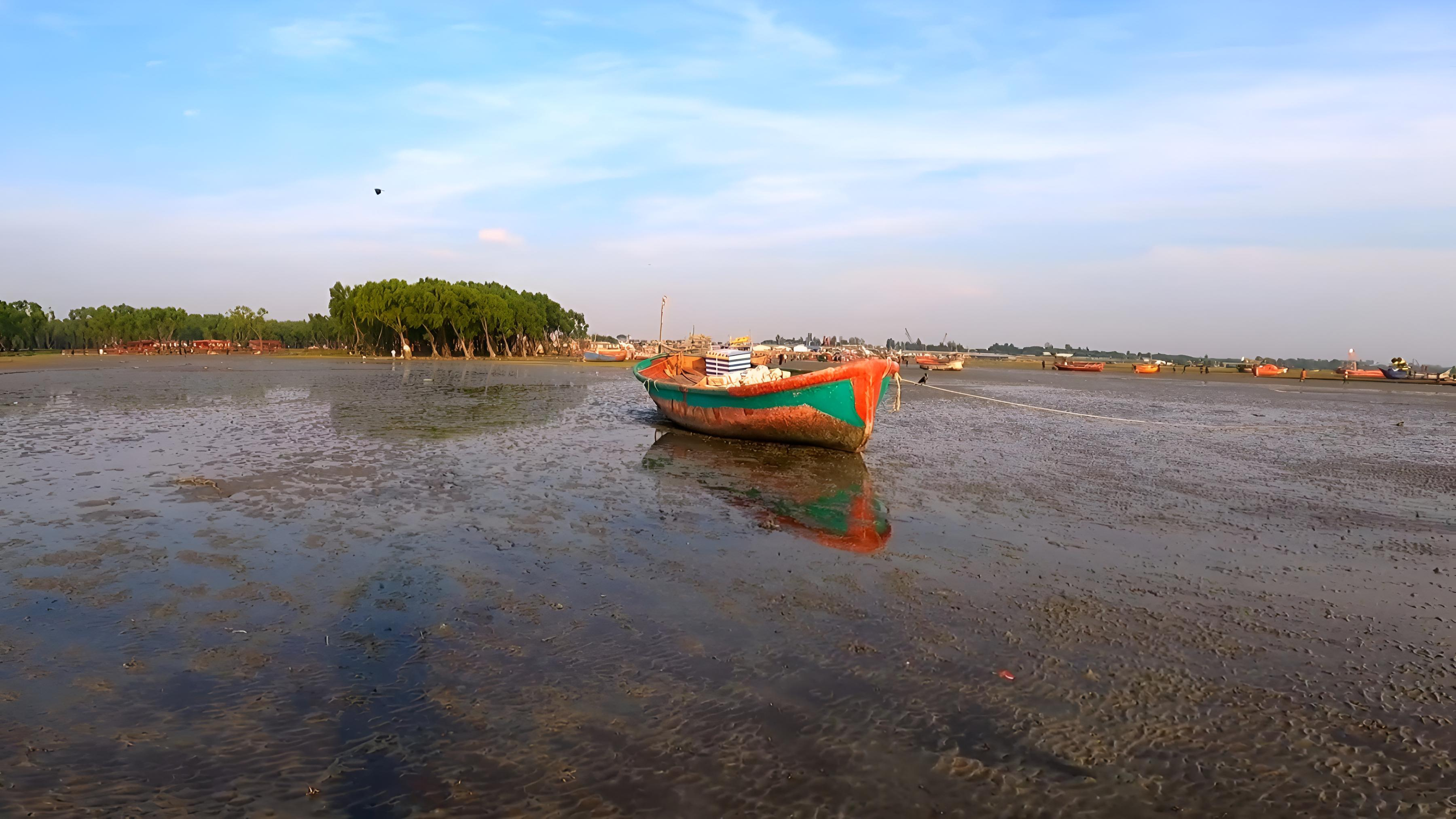
Kattali Sea Beach

The main attractions of Kattali Beach are:

- Uru grass, mangrove forest, winding canals, and flocks of diverse birds.
- Scenes of net weaving, boat repairing, fishing, and selling.
- Ships floating on the sea and the glitter of ship lights in the evening.
- Opportunities for driving, horse riding, speedboat trips, and picnics.
- Every year, Hindu pilgrims come here for the Baruni Snan ritual.

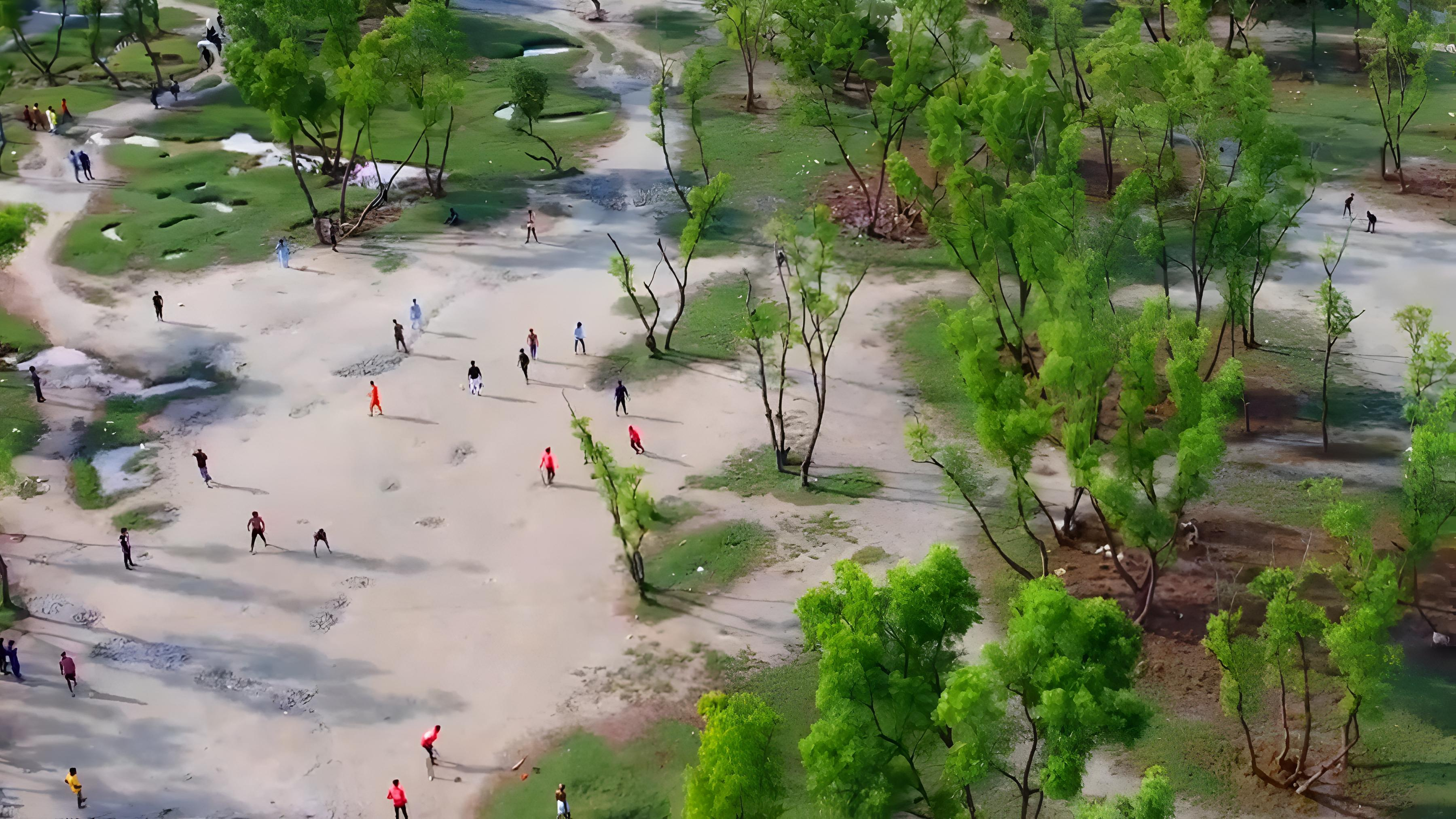
Kattali Sea Beach

== Tourism ==
Kattali Beach is currently not listed as a government-protected area. On the other hand, due to the lack of adequate security after evening, incidents of mugging and theft occur here. There have been demands for establishing a permanent police camp.

== Parks and Infrastructure ==
Several parks have developed around the beach:

- Nizhum Park
- Niribili Nirupoma Park
- Shuktara Park

== See also ==
- List of beaches in Bangladesh
