= Kotka Beach =

Kotka
- Beach
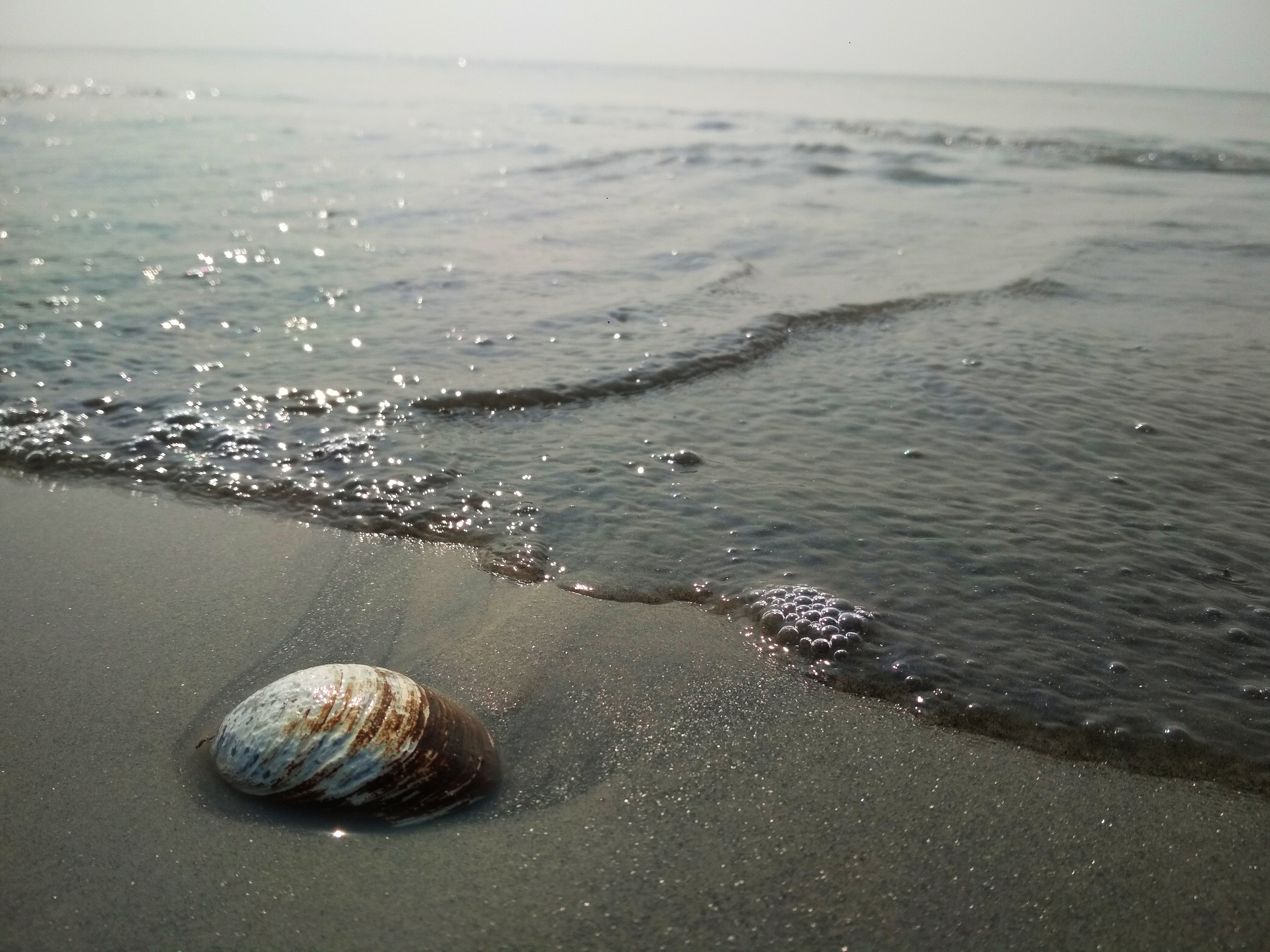
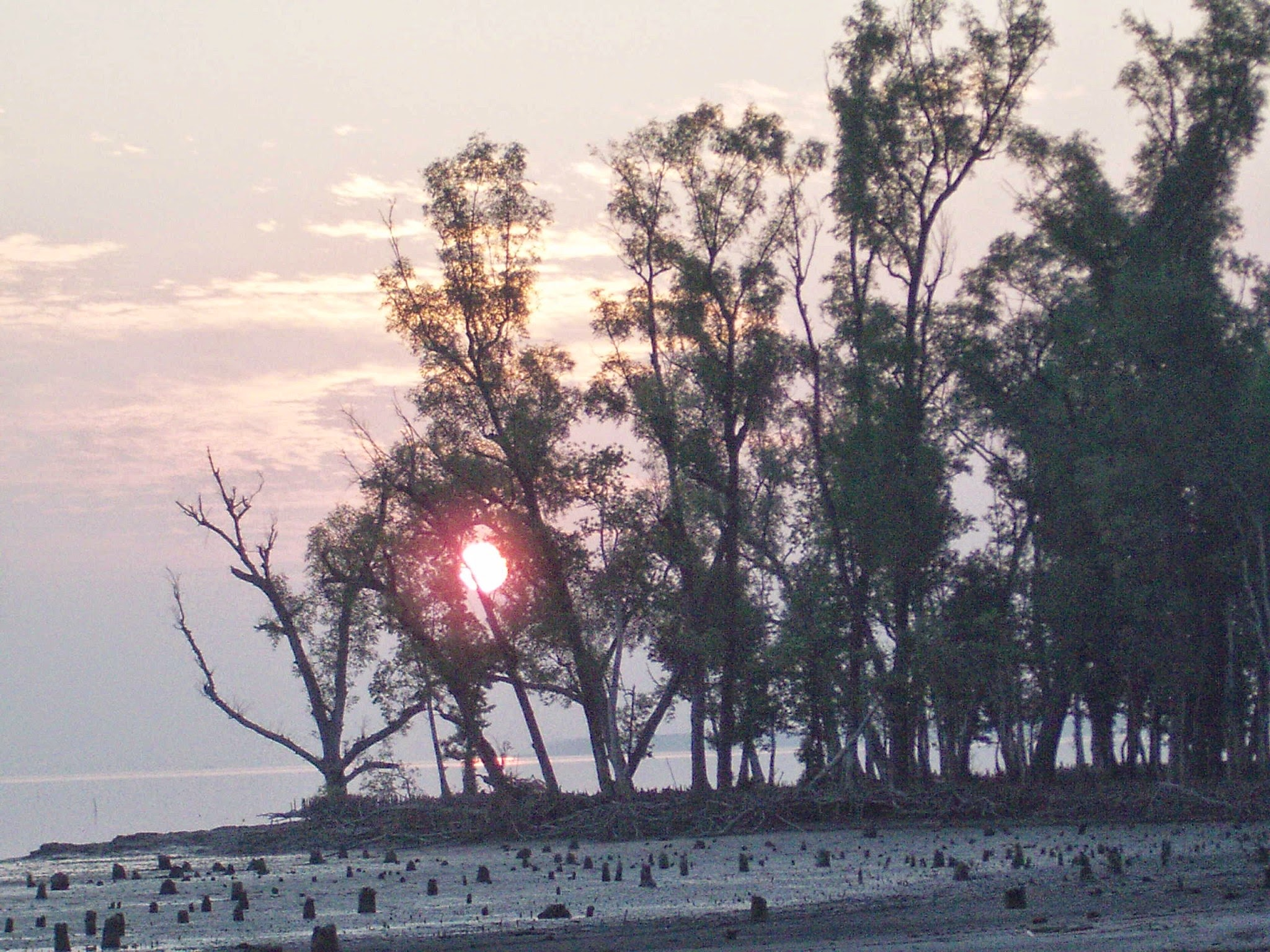
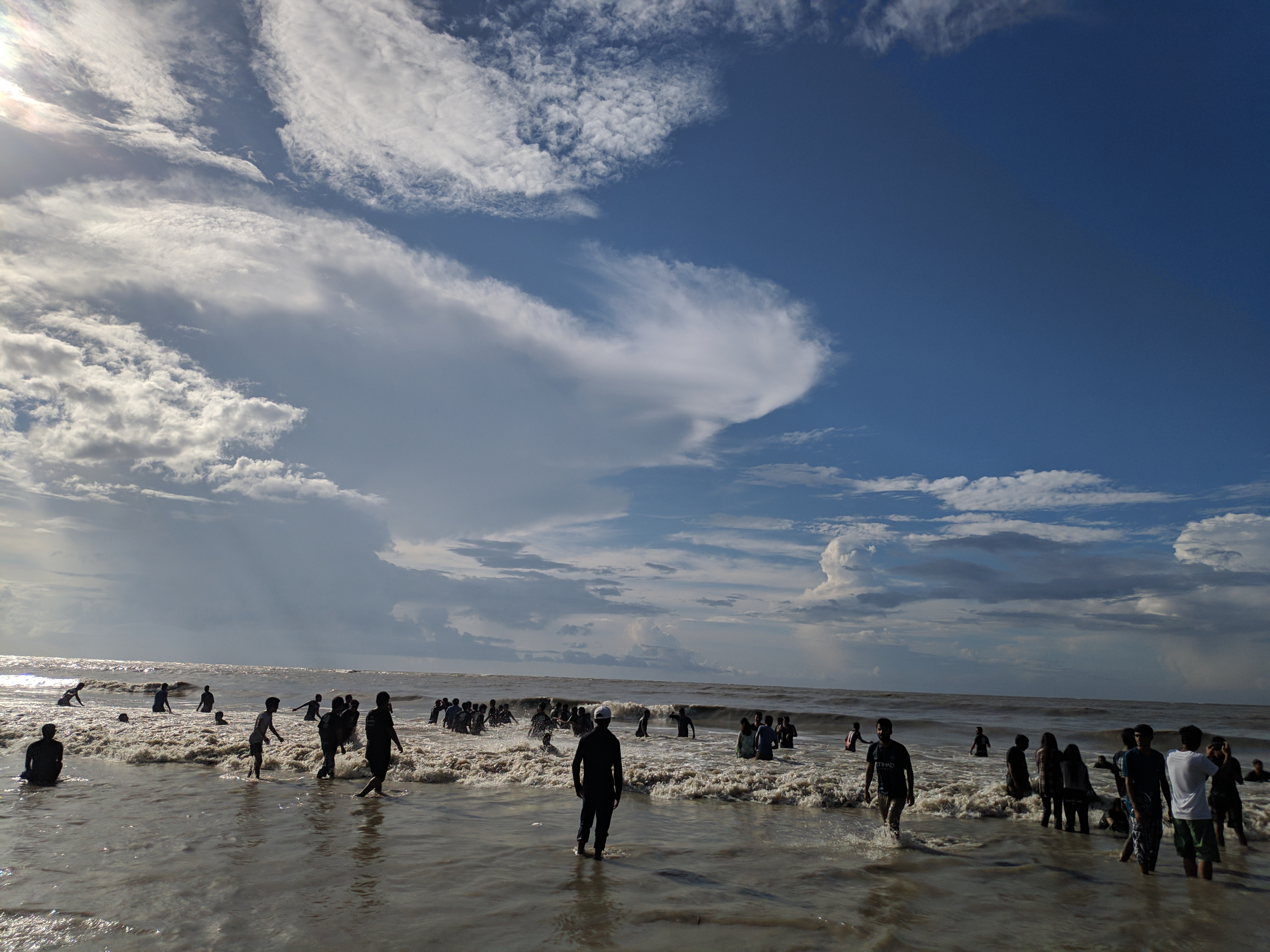
- Top: Shells at Kotka beach, Sunset at Kotka beach, Kotka beach
- Interactive map of Kotka
- Coordinates: 21.85428°N 89.7721627°E
- Country: Bangladesh
- Division: Khulna Division
- District: Khulna District
- Upazila: Koyra Upazila

Kotka Sea Beach is a tourist spot located in Khulna District, in southern Bangladesh. The beach is part of the Sundarbans.

== Location ==
Kotka Sea Beach is situated in Koyra Union of Koyra Upazila, Khulna District. It is located at the southeastern corner of the Sundarbans, the world’s largest mangrove forest. The beach is approximately 90 kilometres from Mongla seaport.

== Natural scenery ==
From Kotka Sea Beach, visitors can experience the beauty of the Sundarbans. One of the main attractions is the opportunity to observe the Bengal tiger from a safe distance. The beach is also home to spotted deer, various bird species, monkeys, wild boars, and many other wild animals. During winter, crocodiles can also be seen. The beach is also considered a great spot to enjoy the sunset.

== Observation tower ==
Kotka Sea Beach has a 40-foot-high, four-storied observation tower. From the tower, visitors can watch herds of deer, running boars, playing monkeys, tiger hunting, movements of the Royal Bengal Tiger, and other wildlife. Most importantly, the natural beauty of the Sundarbans can be enjoyed from this tower.

== Safety ==
Kotka Sea Beach is somewhat dangerous due to the presence of quicksand, which poses risks for accidents. The Forest Department has installed a signboard warning visitors not to enter the sea water.

== Gallery ==
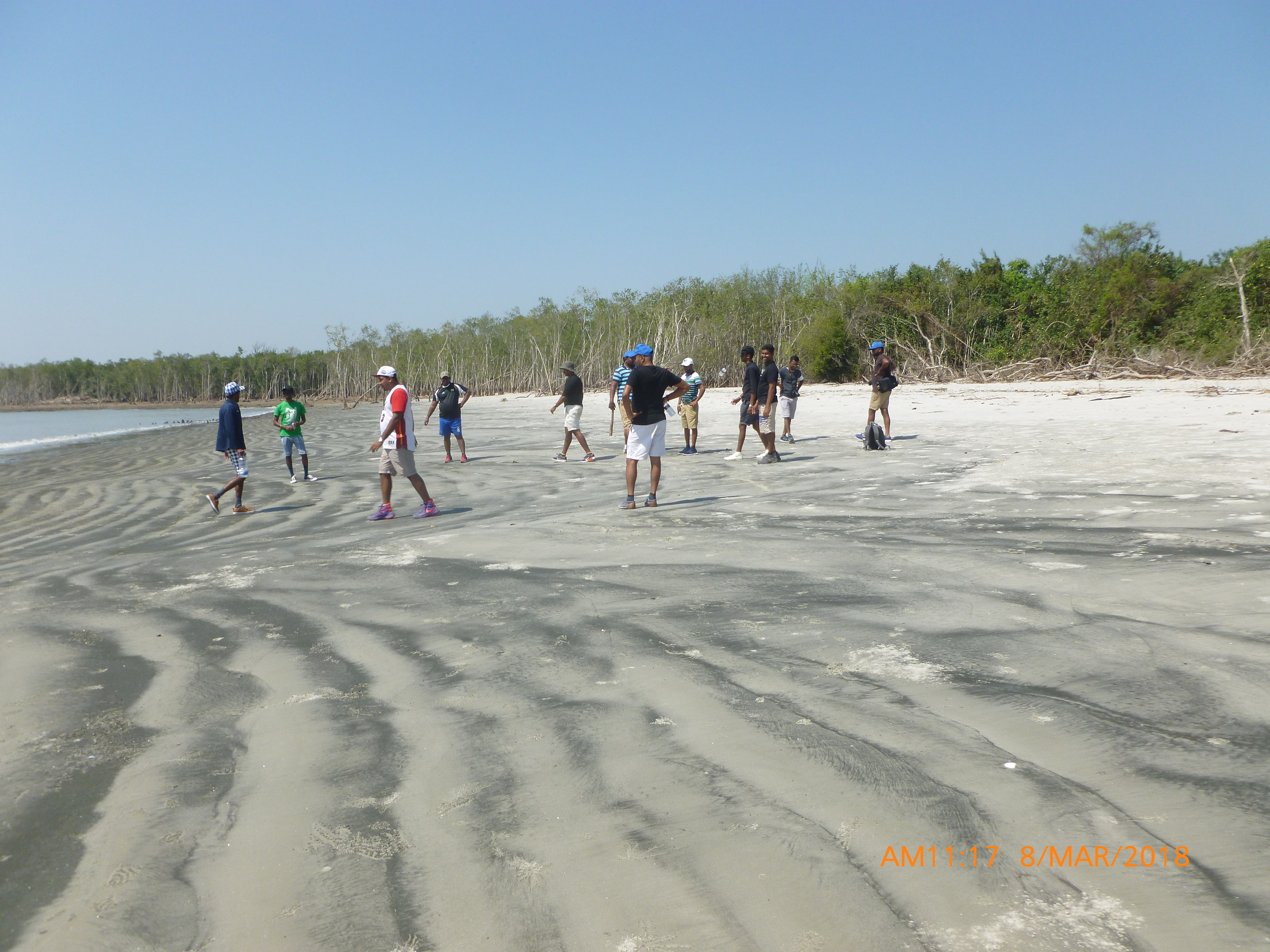
Beach kabaddi

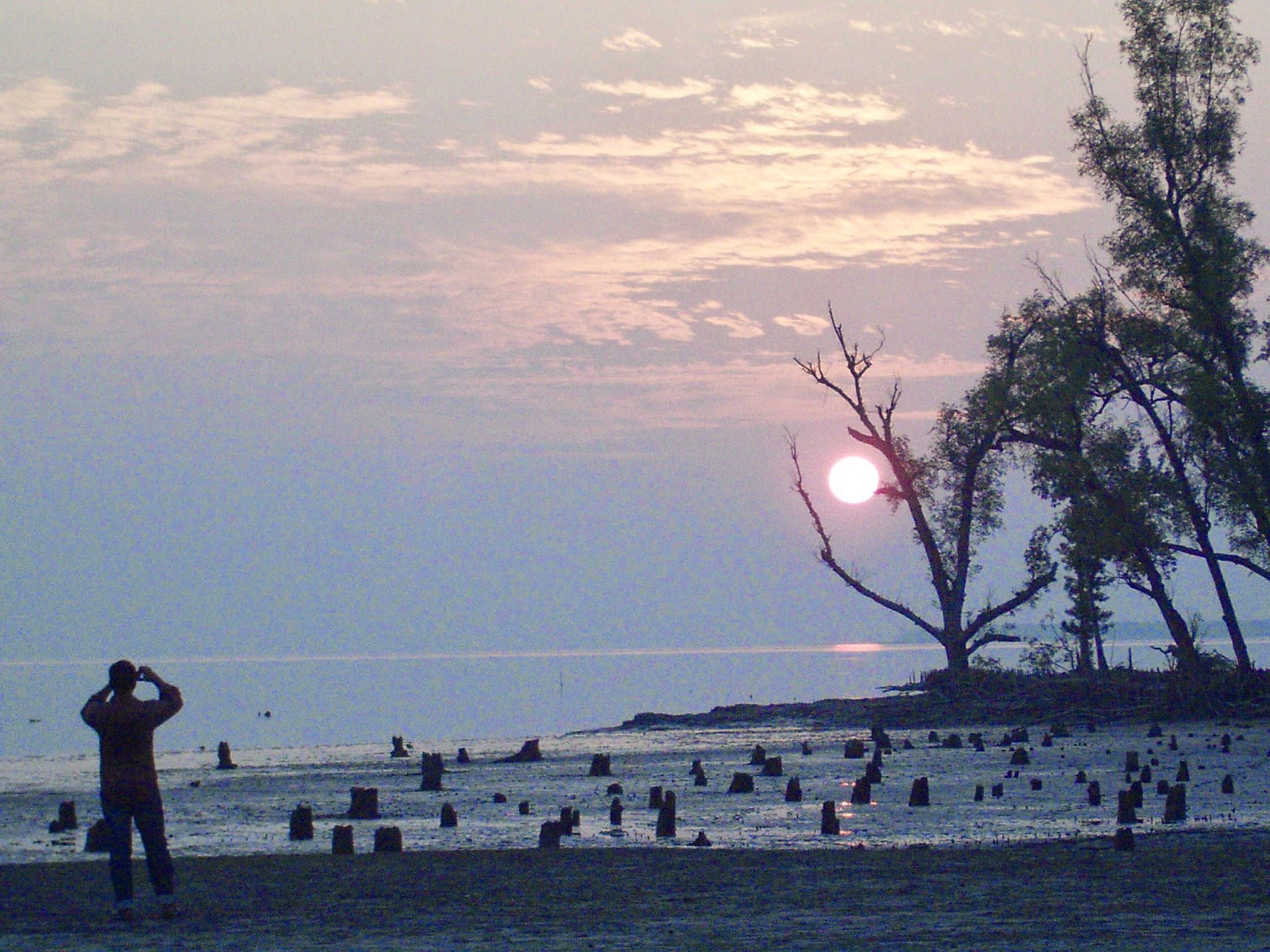
Sunset at the beach

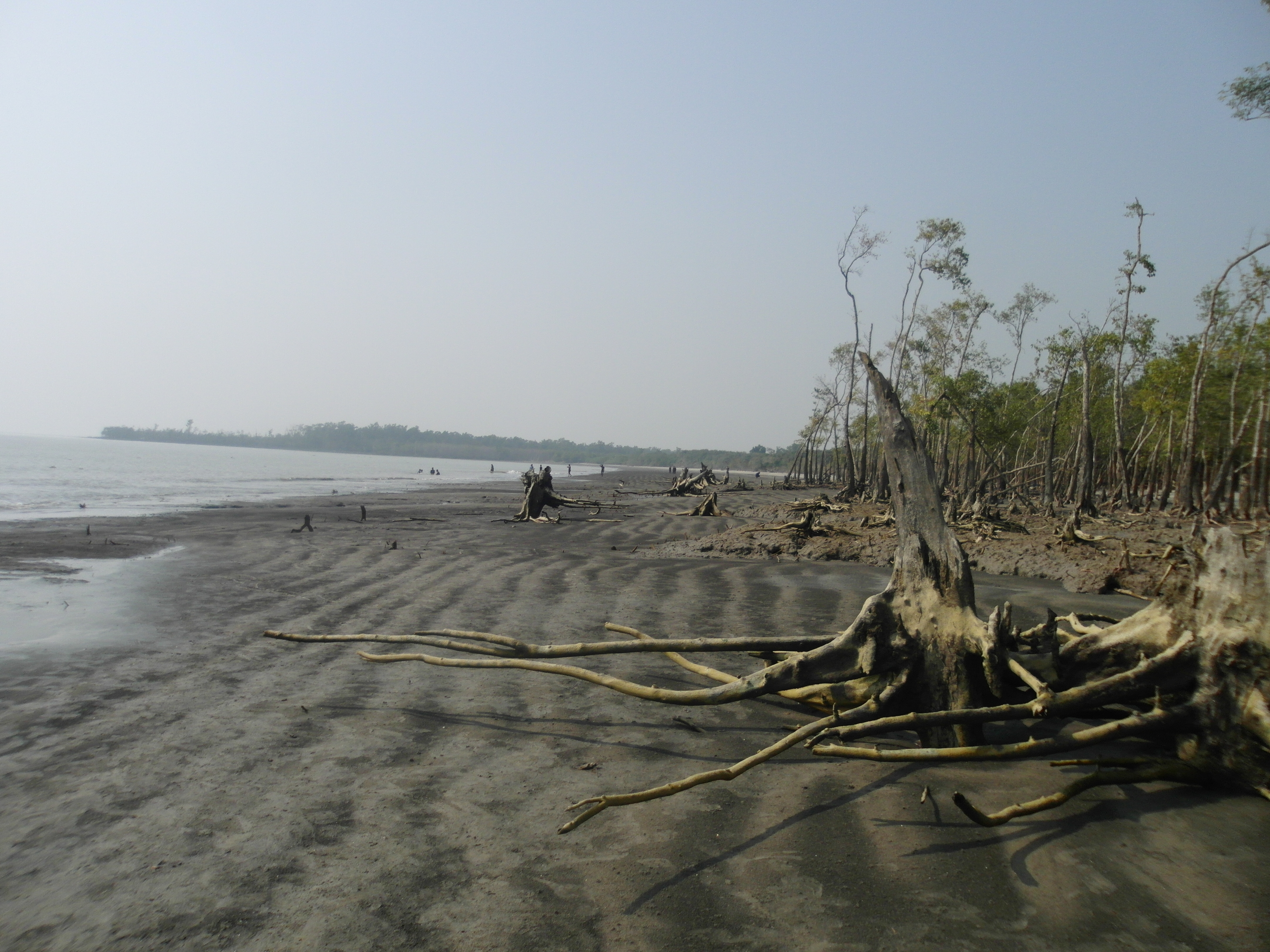
The beach

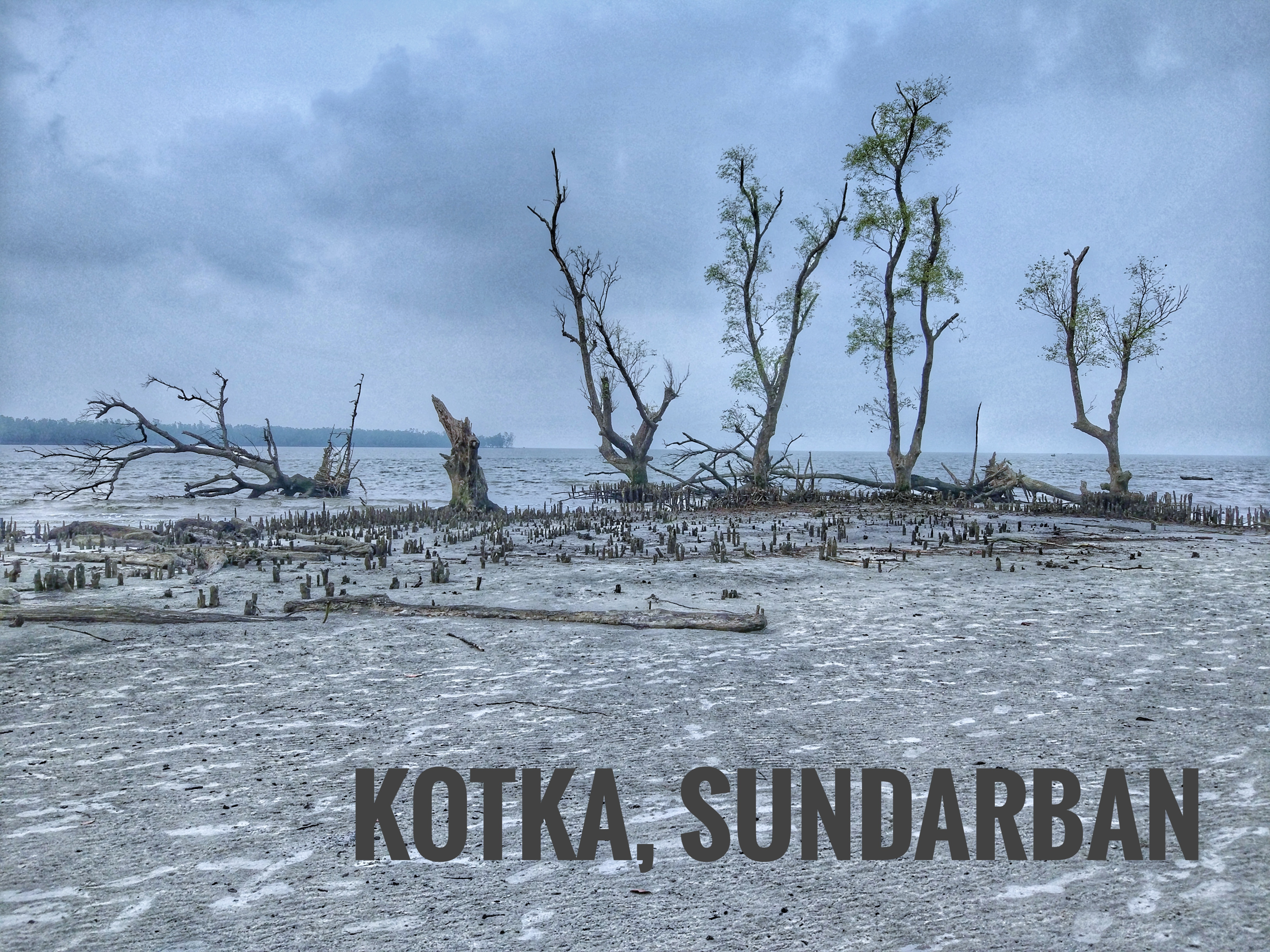
Kotka Sea Beach

== See also ==
- List of beaches in Bangladesh
- Sundarbans
