= Kutubdia Beach =

Beach located on Kutubdia Island

Coordinates: 21.812844°N 91.844913°E

Kutubdia Sea Beach is a beach located on Kutubdia Island in Cox's Bazar District, Bangladesh. The beach is about 23 kilometers long. As it is not very popular among tourists, the area usually remains quiet and calm. Besides the sea beach, notable sites include the lighthouse, the shrine of Kutub Auliya, Kutubdia Channel, and the wind power station, which is the largest in Bangladesh.

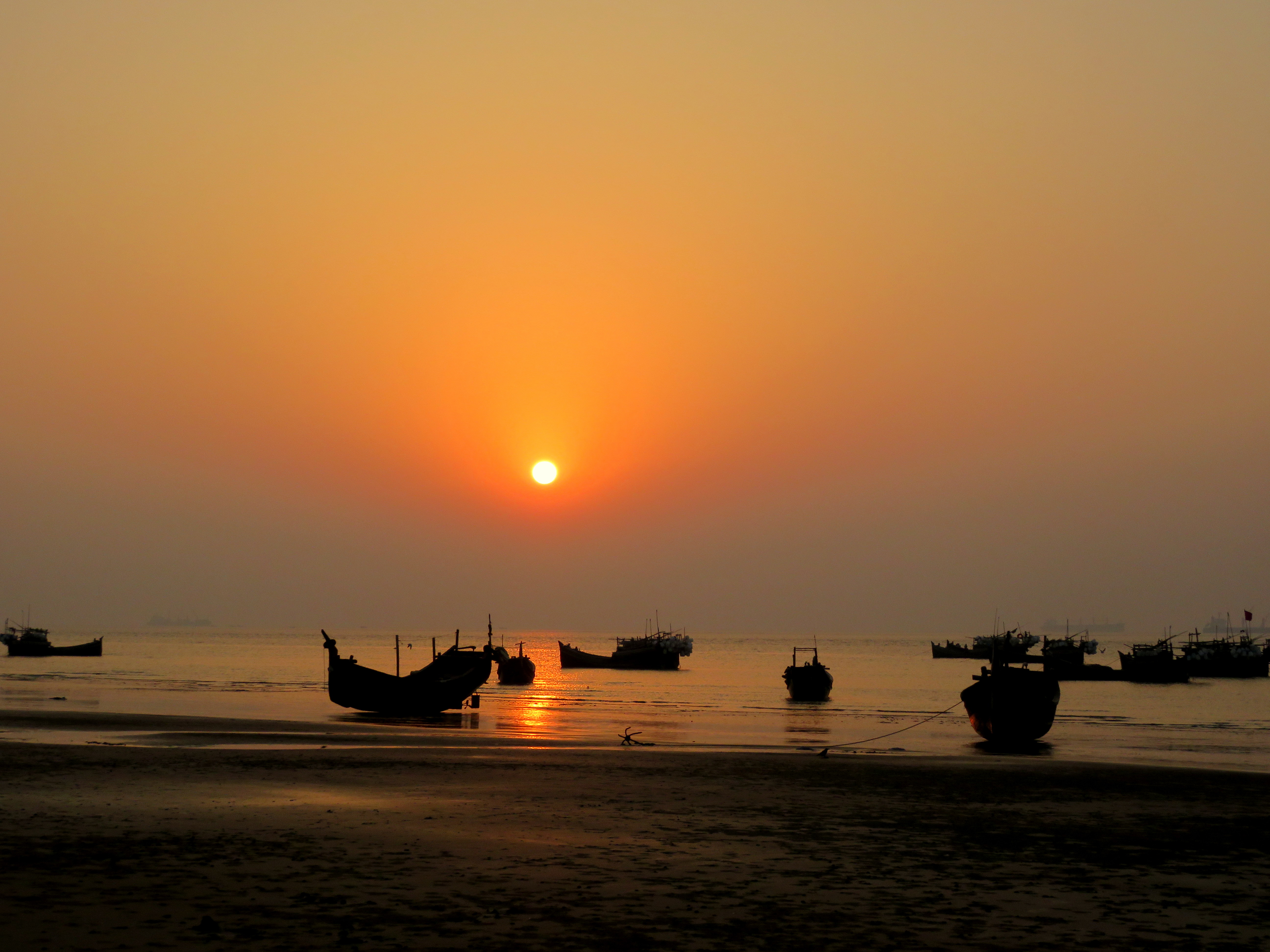
Kutubdia Sea Beach at sunset

== History and naming ==
It is believed that human settlement began on this island at the end of the 15th century. A religious scholar named Hazrat Kutubuddin, along with companions such as Ali Akbar, Ali Fakir, and Ek Hatiya, drove out the Maghs and Portuguese and settled on the island. Meanwhile, Muslims fleeing from Arakan and nearby areas of Chittagong also began to settle here in search of livelihood. Surveys suggest that most of the early settlers came from Anwara, Banshkhali, Satkania, Patiya, and Chakaria. Out of respect for Kutubuddin, the persecuted Muslims named the island Kutubuddin's Dia. Over time, the name evolved into Kutubdia.

== Gallery ==
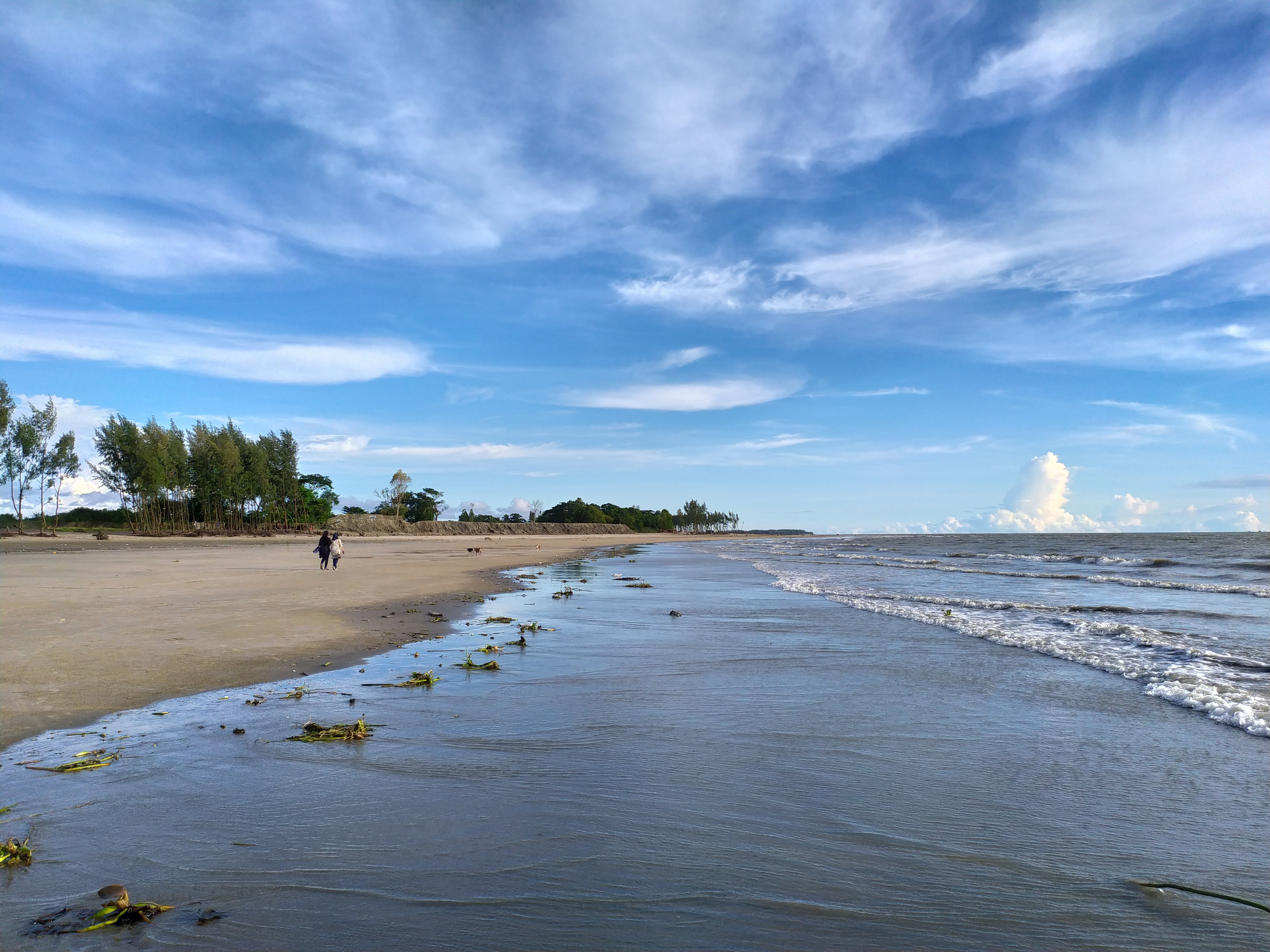
Kutubdia Sea Beach

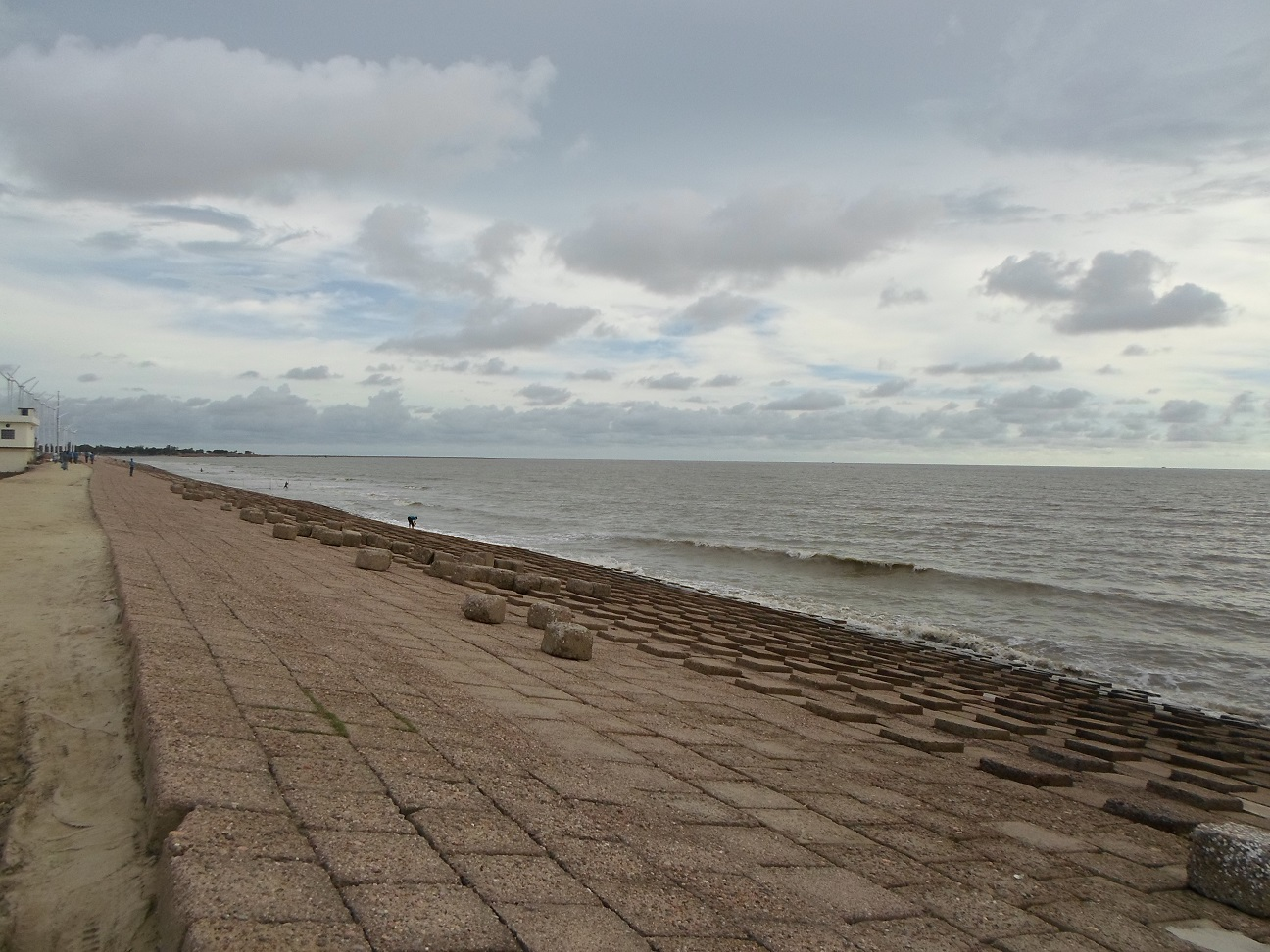
Protective embankment along the coast

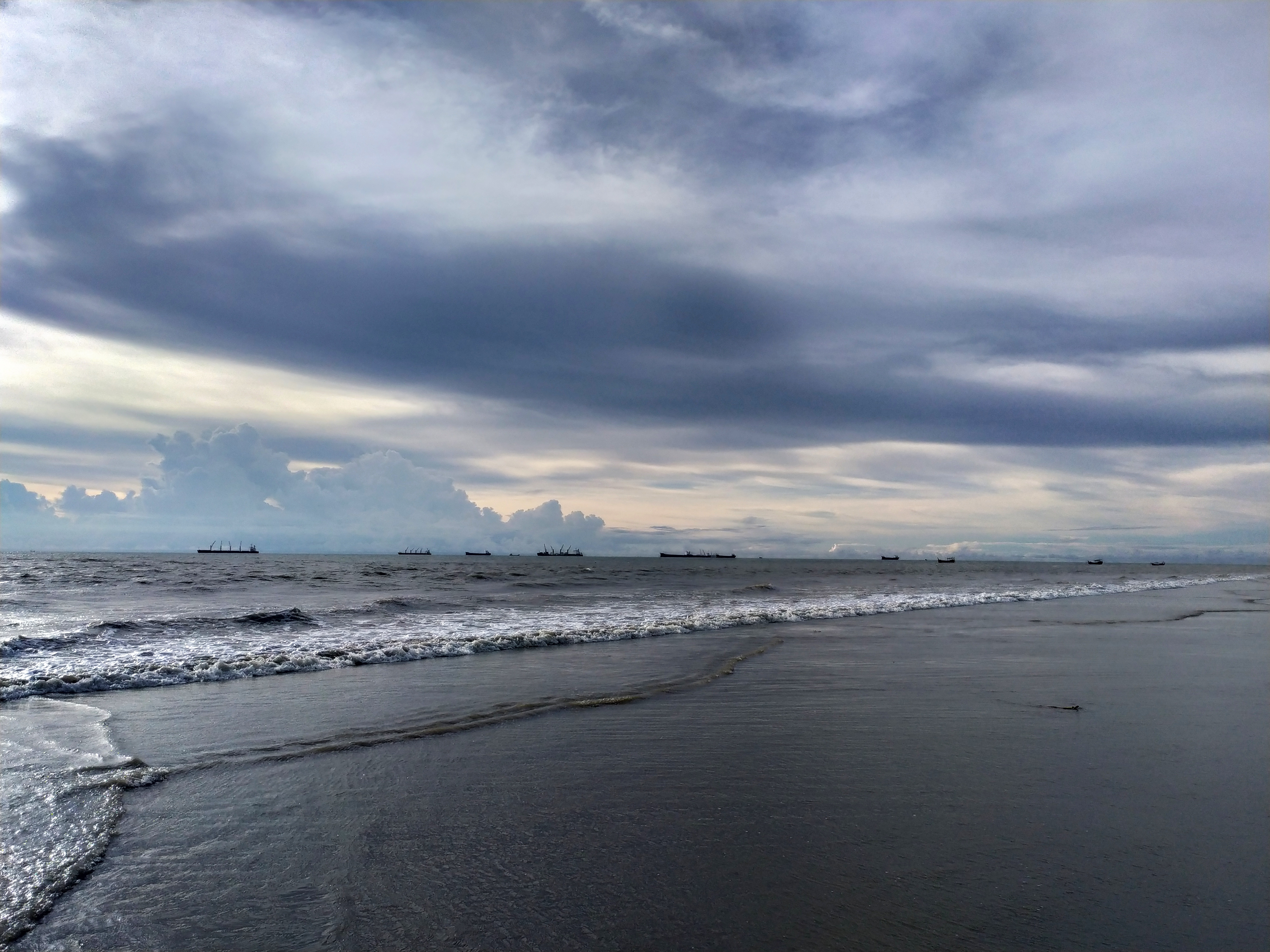
Kutubdia Sea Beach in rough weather

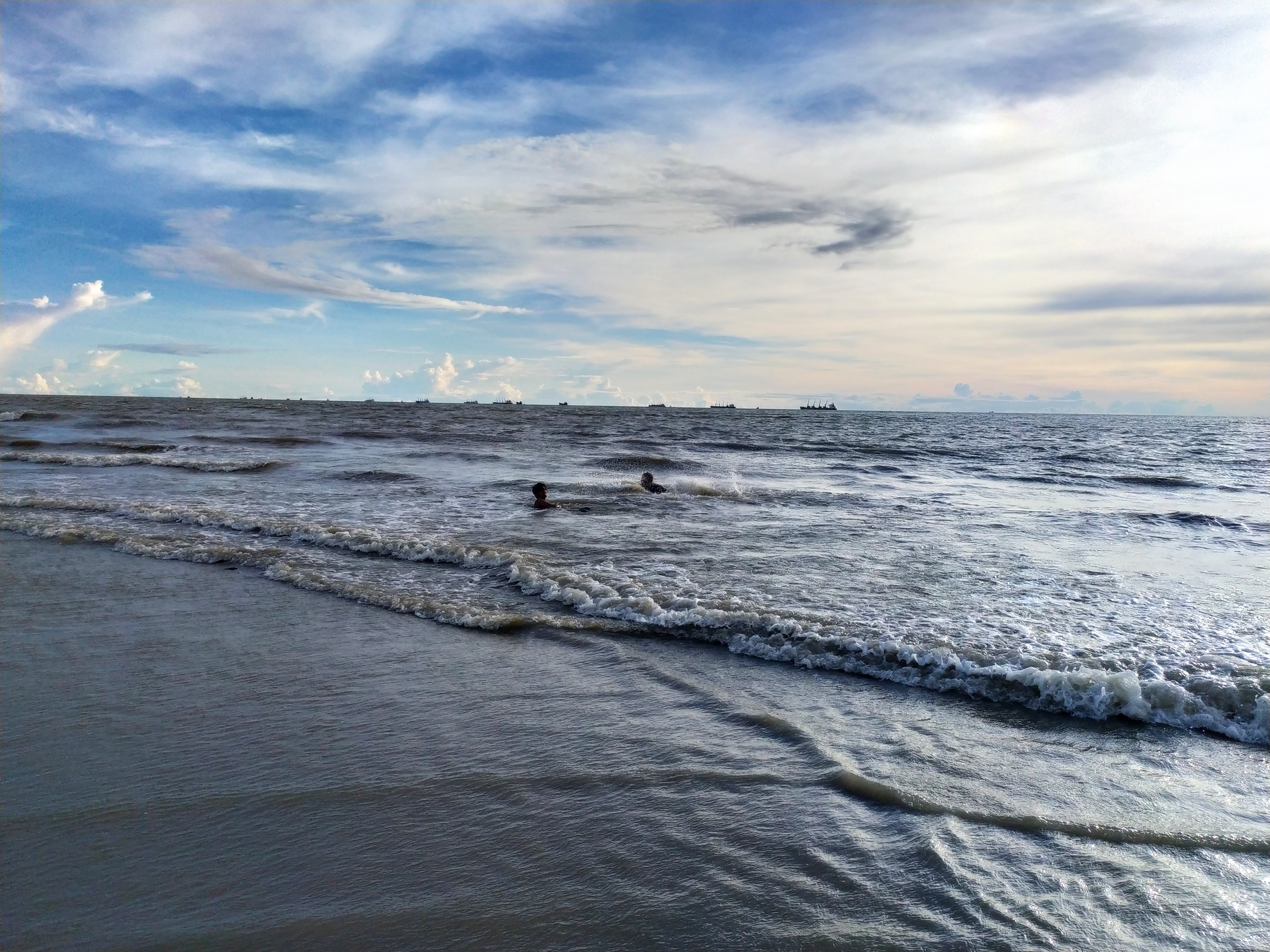
Bay of Bengal from the beach

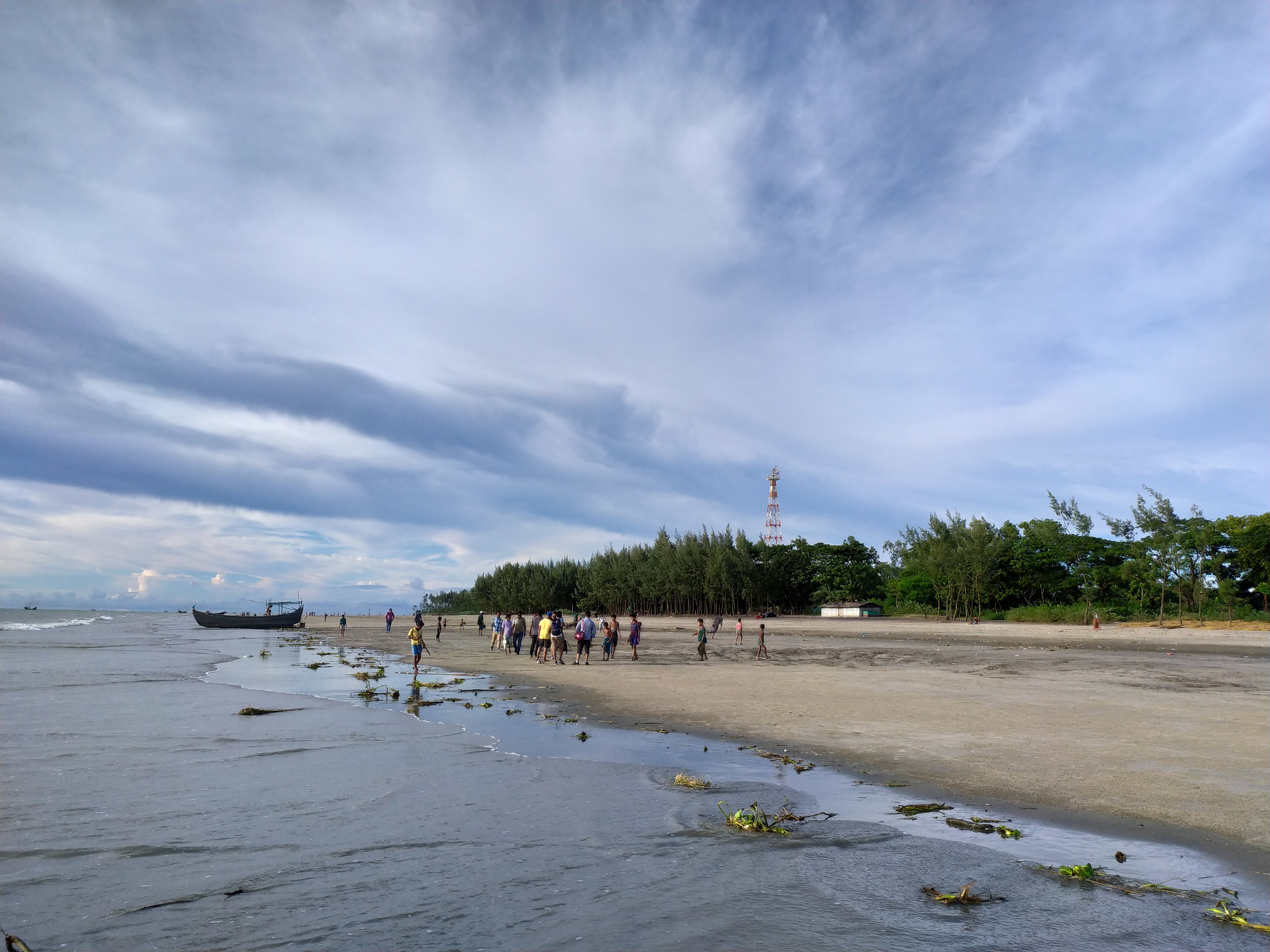
Tourists at Kutubdia Sea Beach

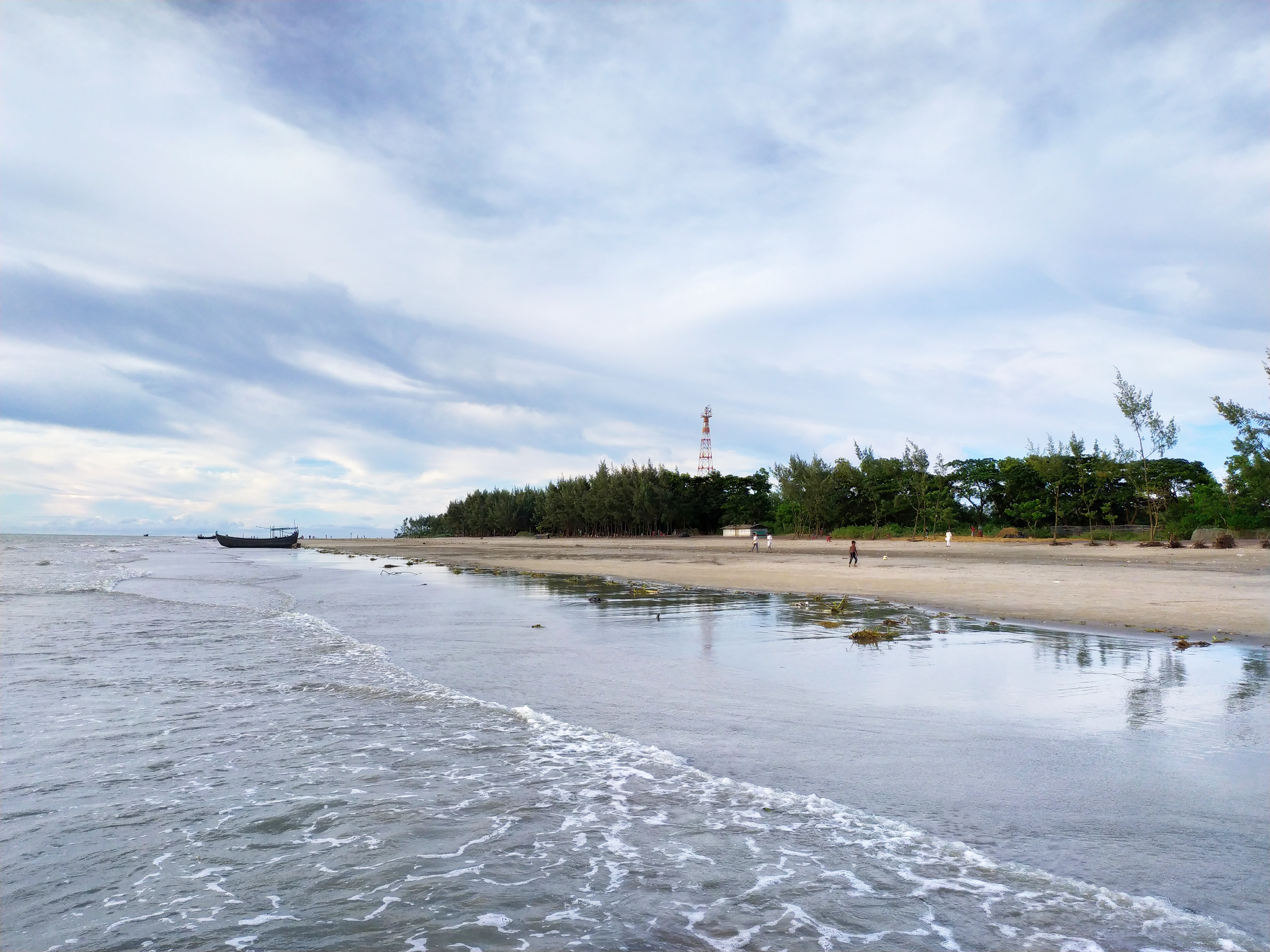
The lighthouse seen from the beach

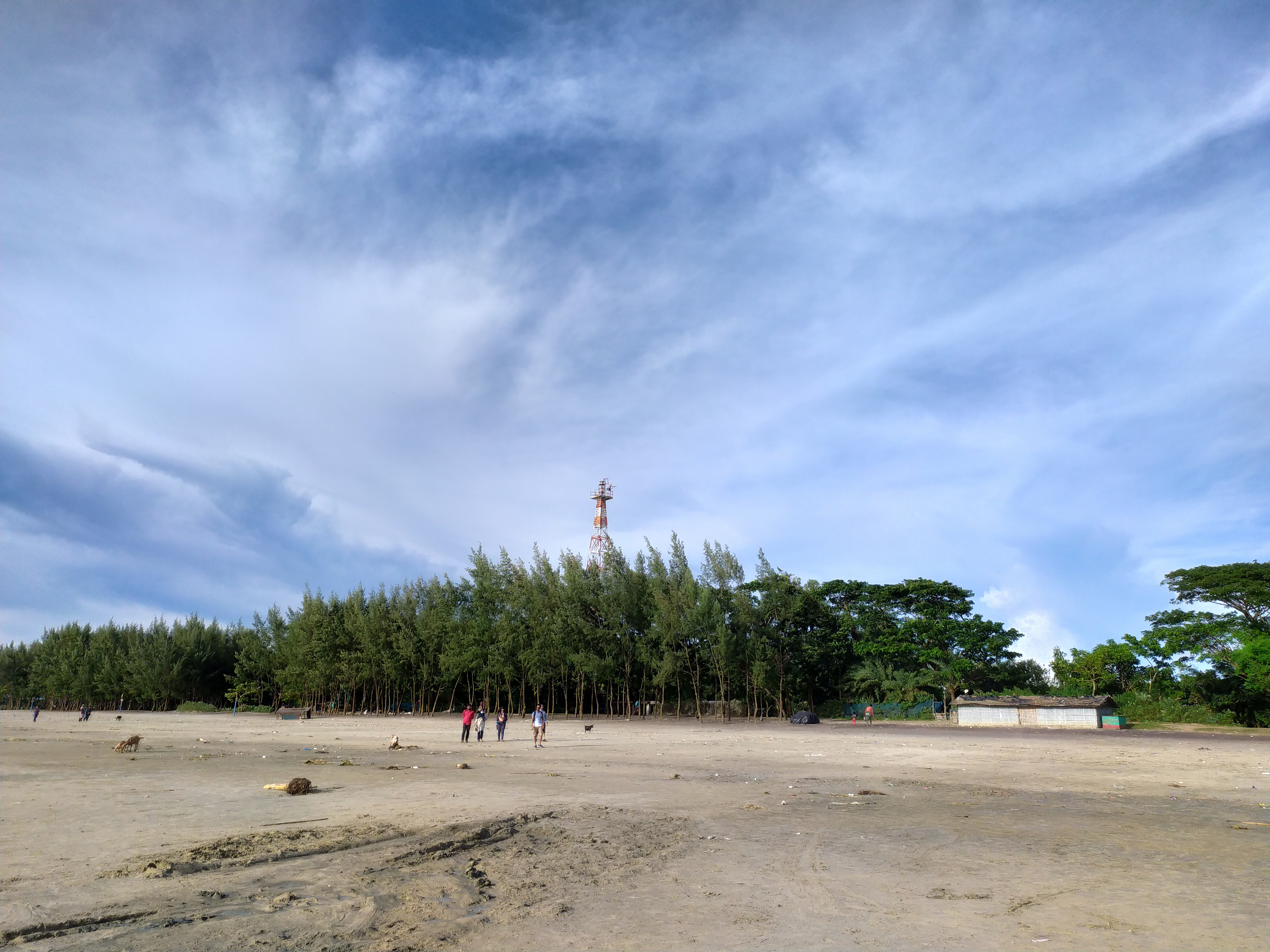
Casuarina forest by the beach

== See also ==
- List of beaches in Bangladesh
