= Shuvo Sondha Beach =

Shuvo Sondha Sea Beach
- Beach
- Country: Bangladesh
- Division: Barisal
- Upazila: Taltoli
- Time zone: UTC+6 (BST)

Shuvo Sondha Sea Beach is located in Nolbunia of Nishanbariya Union, Taltali Upazila, in the coastal district of Barguna. It stretches across 4.5 kilometers at the confluence of the Payra, Bishkhali, and Baleshwar rivers. It is a major attraction.

== History ==
Efforts to develop this beach as a tourist spot were initiated by the then Upazila Nirbahi Officer (UNO) of Taltali, Badruddoza Shuvo, along with several local tourism enthusiasts and journalists. Following these efforts, on 1 December 2017, the newly transferred UNO Badruddoza Shuvo officially inaugurated the area as a tourist center. The beach was named "Shuvo Sondha Sea Beach Tourism Center" in his honor.

== Location ==
Shuvo Sondha Sea Beach is located about 15 kilometers from the headquarters of Taltali Upazila. The beach stands at the estuary where the three major rivers of Barguna—Payra, Bishkhali, and Baleshwar—meet the sea. The sandy coastline stretches nearly four kilometers.

== Natural scenery ==
On one side lies the sea, while on the other, casuarina (jhau) forests spread across the land. To reach the beach, visitors must walk along a quiet road. Soon, they encounter the sandy shore, decorated with crab patterns. The combination of seawater on one side and casuarina forest attracts visitors.

== Tourism ==
The beach attracts a large number of visitors, contributing to the local economy. In the past, there were no proper facilities for boat rentals or parking, but these have recently been arranged by the authorities. However, due to the absence of tourist police, the beach is not considered safe at night.

== See also ==
- List of beaches in Bangladesh
