= Mini Cox's Bazar =

Tourists attraction in Chandpur, Bangladesh

Padma-Meghna Char Nickname: Sand Char
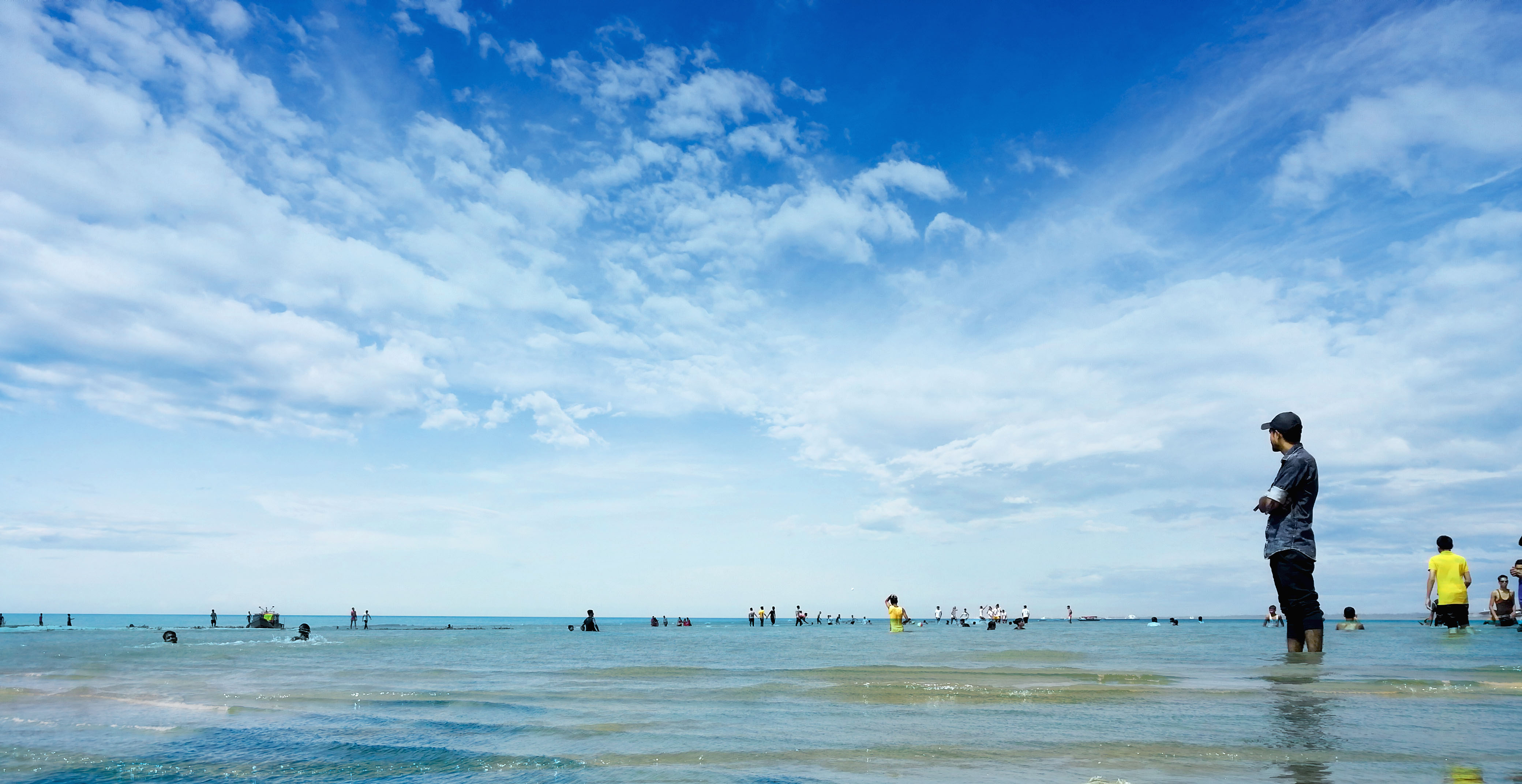
- Mini Cox's Bazar in Chandpur (2019)

Geography
- Location: Chandpur, Bangladesh
- Type: Char

Administration
- Bangladesh

Additional information
- Postal code: 3600
- Identified as a threat to the Chandpur town protection embankment

Meghna Char is a tourist spot located at the confluence of the Padma, Meghna, and Dakatia rivers in Rajrajeshwar Union, Chandpur District, Bangladesh. Locally, it is also known as Balu Char, Padma Char, and Meghna Char. The tourist spot is privately operated by an organization called “Swapna Tourism.”

== History and location ==
About one and a half kilometers from Chandpur Trinodi Mohona Boro Station Molhead, there is a sandy land at the southeastern part of the confluence of the Padma and Meghna rivers. As the land is slightly elevated from the river surface, even during high tide in the dry and monsoon seasons, it does not completely submerge under water. Tourists visit throughout the year. From the beginning of 2018, Mini Cox’s Bazar gradually became known nationwide as a tourist destination. This place originated naturally through the constant erosion and formation of the river.

== Attractions ==
The rivers surrounding the area and the view from a distance, where the southeastern part reveals Chandpur district town and on the opposite side a small part of Shariatpur district, are the special attractions of this tourist spot. During the winter season and until early summer, the beauty of this tourist spot captivates visitors. Situated at the confluence of the Padma and Meghna rivers, tourists from different regions of Bangladesh gather here to enjoy the beauty of the small waves of the vast waters of the Meghna and Padma on both sides, along with the sandy char. Visitors can see both sunrise and sunset from this location. The sight of small waves from both rivers crashing, fishermen catching hilsa in the Padma-Meghna, and green grass growing between the vast sandy stretches add to the charm of Mini Cox’s Bazar. Additionally, in this popular spot, tourists have the opportunity to swim and bathe in the fresh waters of the Meghna and Padma rivers.

== Risks ==
During the monsoon season, Mini Cox’s Bazar becomes risky for tourists who cannot swim. On 12 June 2019, a tourist went missing while swimming here. On 13 June 2019, members of the Chandpur River Fire Service, Bangladesh Navy, and Bangladesh Coast Guard recovered his body. The Bangladesh Water Development Board has also identified this tourist spot as risky for the Chandpur town protection embankment.

== See also ==
- List of beaches in Bangladesh
