= Laldia Beach =

Laldia Sea Beach
- Beach
- Interactive map of Laldia Sea Beach
- Country: Bangladesh
- Division: Barisal Division
- District: Barguna District
- Upazila: Patharghata Upazila
- Union: Sadar Patharghata Union
- Time zone: UTC+6 (BST)

Laldia Sea Beach is located in Patharghata Upazila of Barguna District, Bangladesh, at the confluence of the Baleshwar River and the Bishkhali River, beside the Laldia Forest. The beach is being developed following the model of Cox's Bazar.

== Location ==
From Barguna, one can easily reach Laldia Forest by motorcycle after traveling to Patharghata by bus. It is also possible to go via Pirojpur to Patharghata. From Haringhata, it takes about two hours on foot through the Laldia Forest to reach the beach.

== Natural Scenery ==
Sunrise and sunset can be observed from here. With the sea on one side, the forest on the other, and the beach in between, this natural beauty is rare. A forest of casuarina trees has been planted along the shore of Laldia Sea Beach. The 950-meter-long wooden foot trail in Harinbaria Forest has been extended to reach Laldia Sea Beach.

== See also ==
- List of beaches in Bangladesh
