= Banshkhali Beach =

Sea beach in Chittagong, Bangladesh

Banshkhali Sea Beach
- Beach
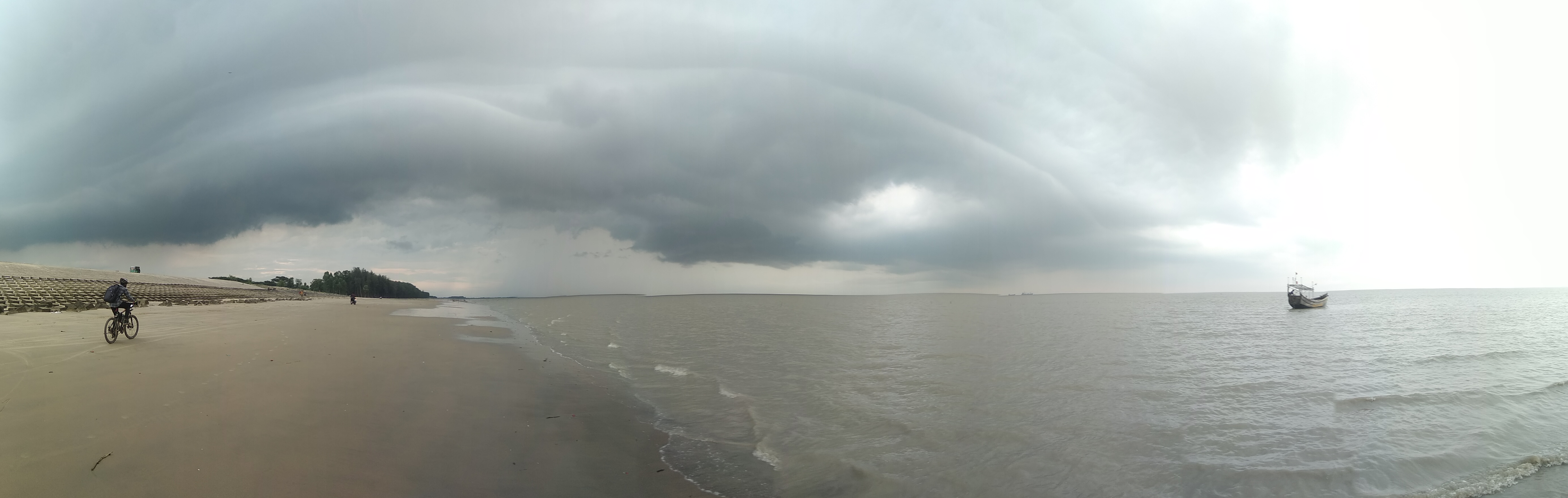
- Panorama view of the beach
- Interactive map of Banshkhali Sea Beach
- Coordinates: 22.060687°N 91.873802°E
- Location: Banshkhali Upazila, Chittagong

Dimensions
  - Length: 37 km (23 mi)

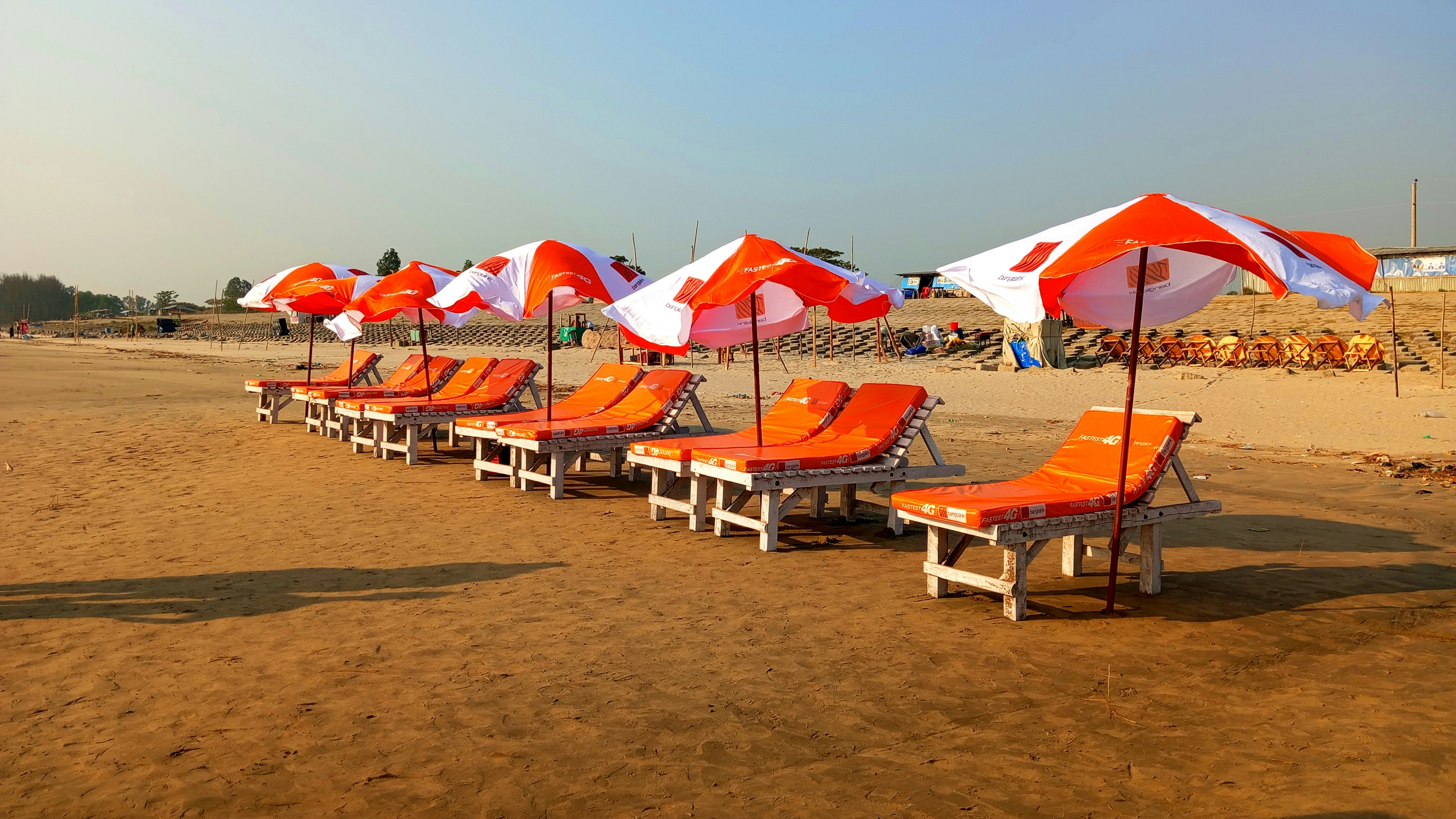
Sitting arrangement in front of the beach

Banshkhali Sea Beach is a beach located in Banshkhali Upazila of Chittagong District, Bangladesh. It is also known as Baharchhara Beach. The beach is sandy and has two main points: Kadamrasul Point and Khankhanabad Point. The total length of the beach is 37 kilometres. After Cox's Bazar Beach, it is the second-longest sea beach in Bangladesh.

== Location ==
The beach is located about 40 kilometres from Chittagong city. It stretches along the coastal areas of Chanua, Gandamara, Saral, Baharchhara, and Khankhanabad under Banshkhali Upazila. On the western side of the beach lies the Kutubdia Channel, and nearby is the island of Kutubdia. The beach can be directly accessed from Gunagari Bazar of Banshkhali. The more than 450-year-old Bakshi Hamid Mosque is also located just a few kilometres from the beach.

== Parts of the beach ==
=== Katharia Point ===
Banshkhali Sea Beach (Katharia Point)

Katharia Point, located about 31 kilometres from Chittagong city, is one of the main attractions of Banshkhali Sea Beach. Unlike typical sandy beaches, it is of a different nature, known as a clay beach. The natural surroundings are captivating — rows of casuarina trees on the east, dense mangrove forest on the south, and a wide plain-like open area in the middle. Although no specific infrastructure has been developed for tourists, the communication system is good, and vehicles can reach the shore. However, the beauty of the beach has been slightly diminished by the artificial canals dug by local fish traders. Despite administrative monitoring, there are complaints of irregularities in some areas, though no major security concerns have been reported yet. Although it has great tourism potential, Katharia Point has not become as popular as Baharchhara Point due to lack of proper initiatives.

== Environment ==
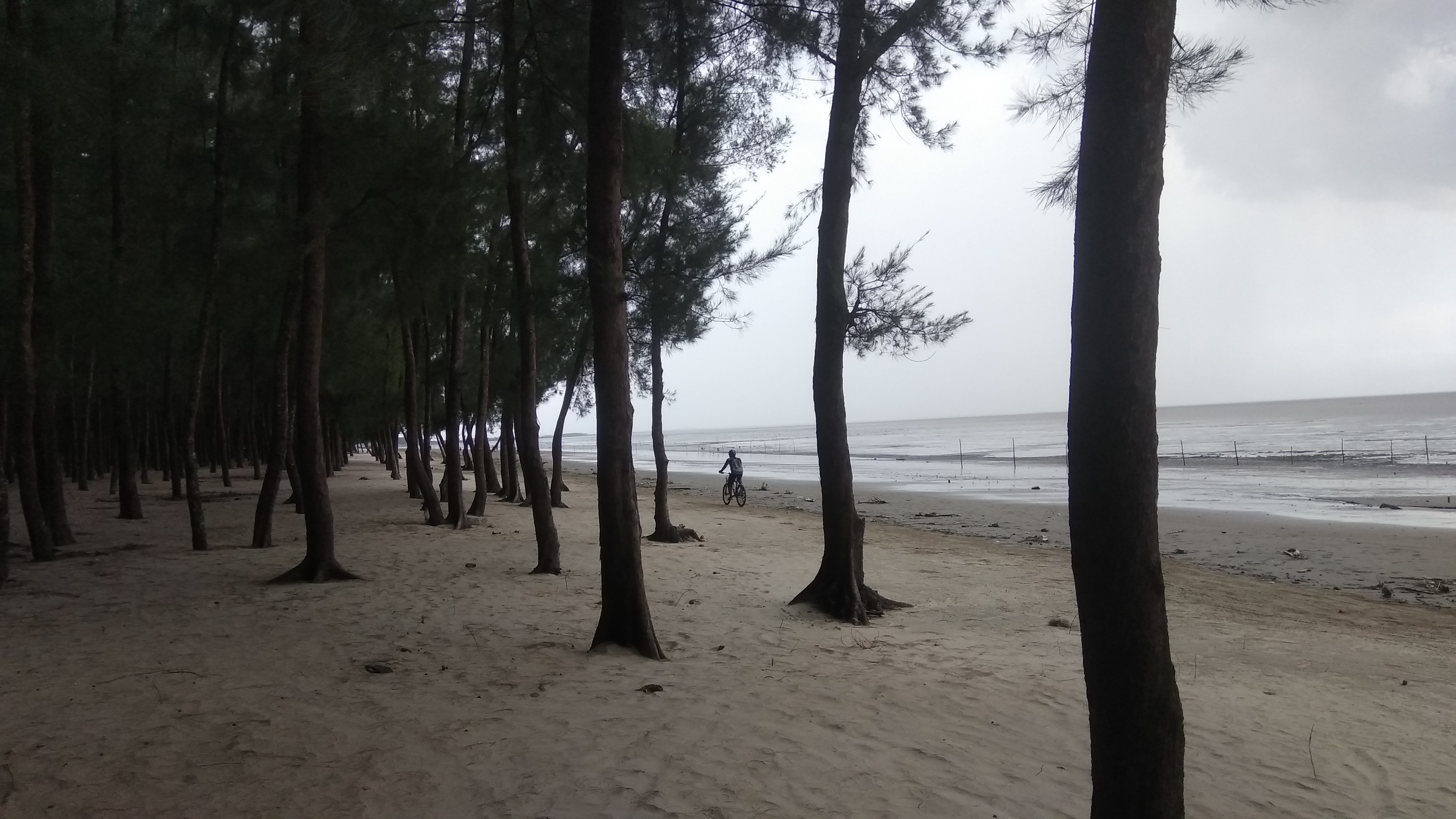
Casuarina forest at Banshkhali Sea Beach

After Cyclone Sidr in 2007, casuarina trees were planted on the beach, forming a casuarina grove. Red crabs are found on this beach, especially in the mornings when they are more visible. The beach offers a great view of the sunset. As it is located a bit far from the city, the number of tourists here remains relatively low. During the monsoon season, the width of the beach reduces to some extent.

== Gallery ==
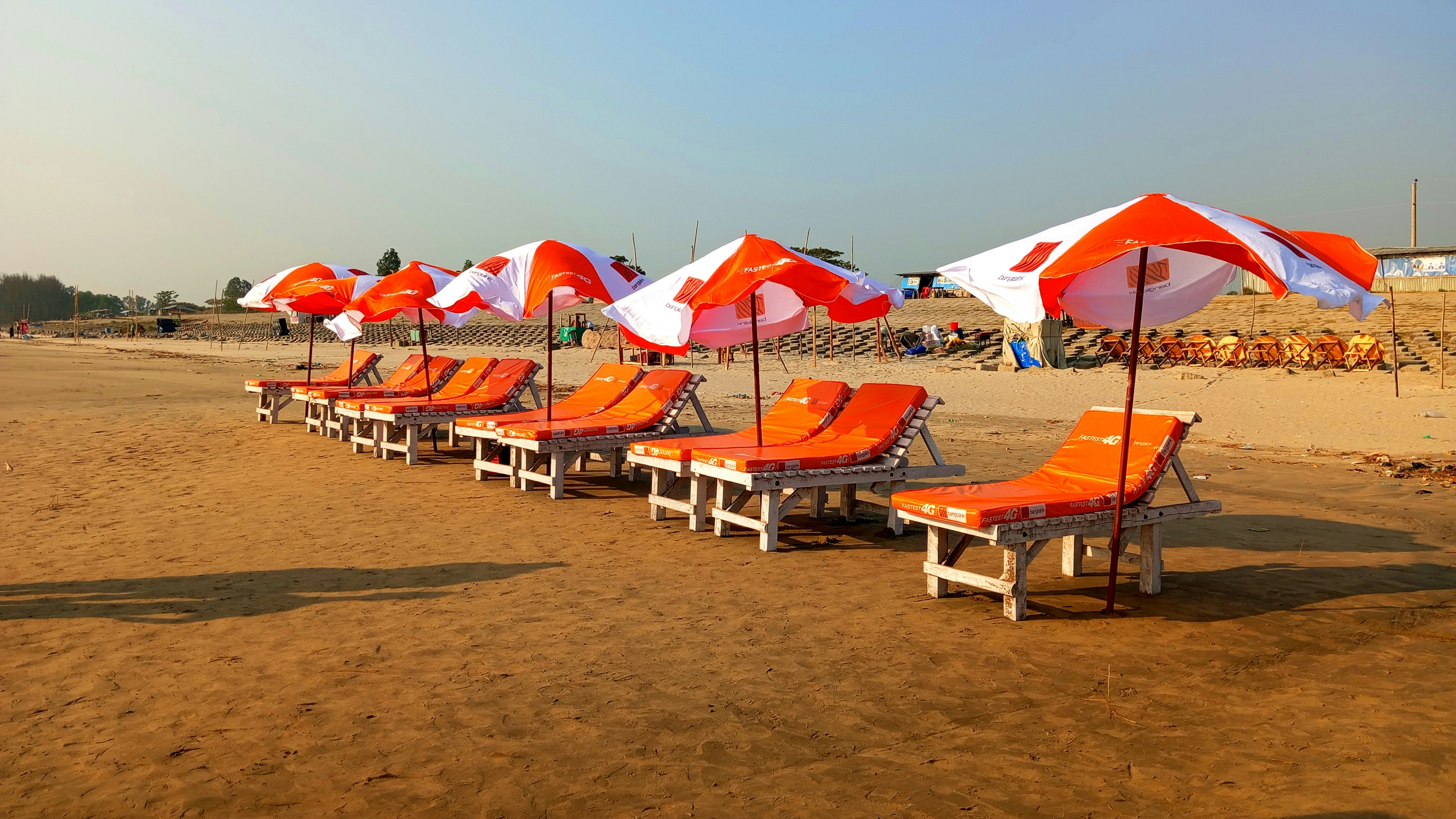
Baharchhara Point

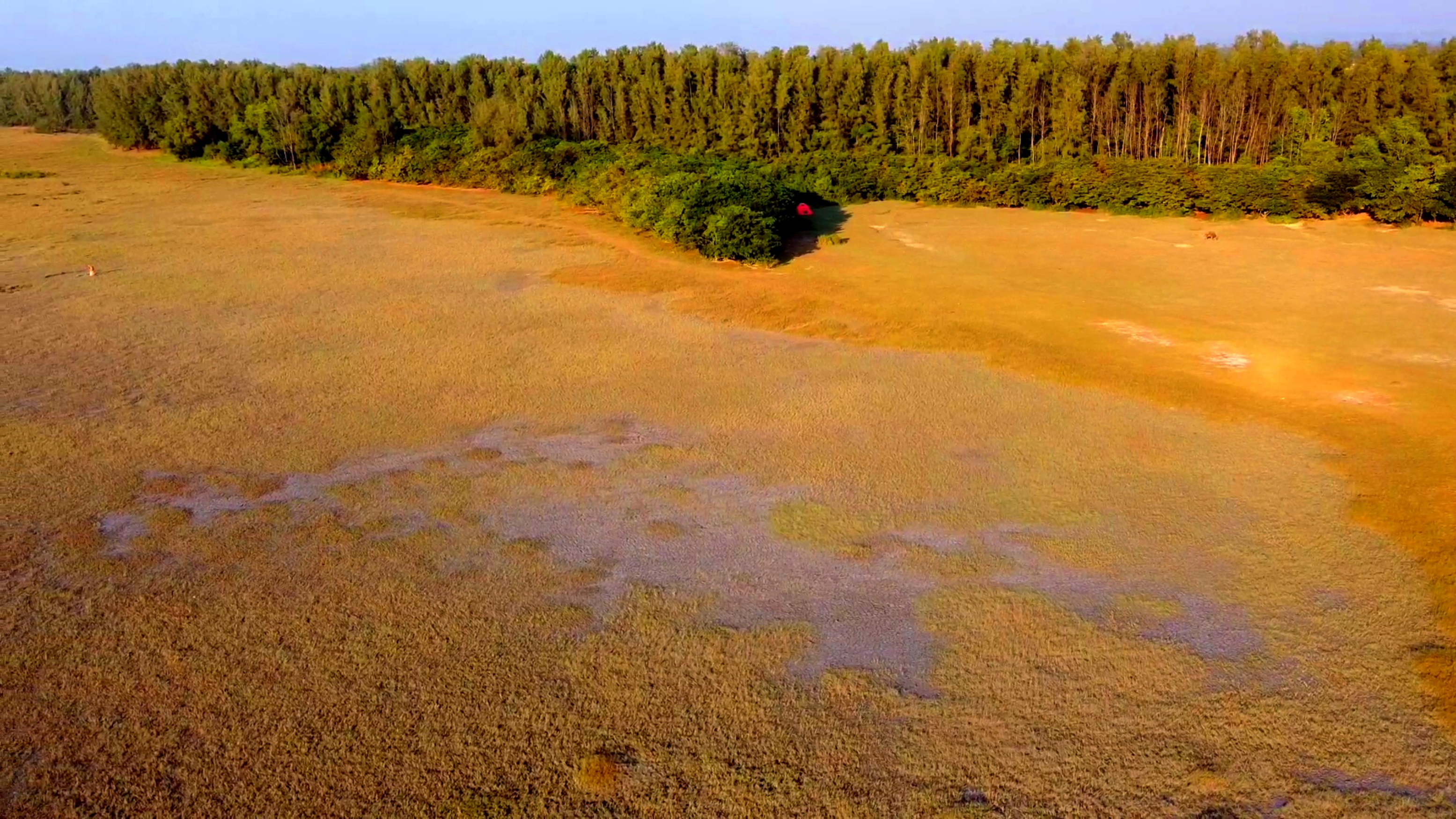
Katharia Point

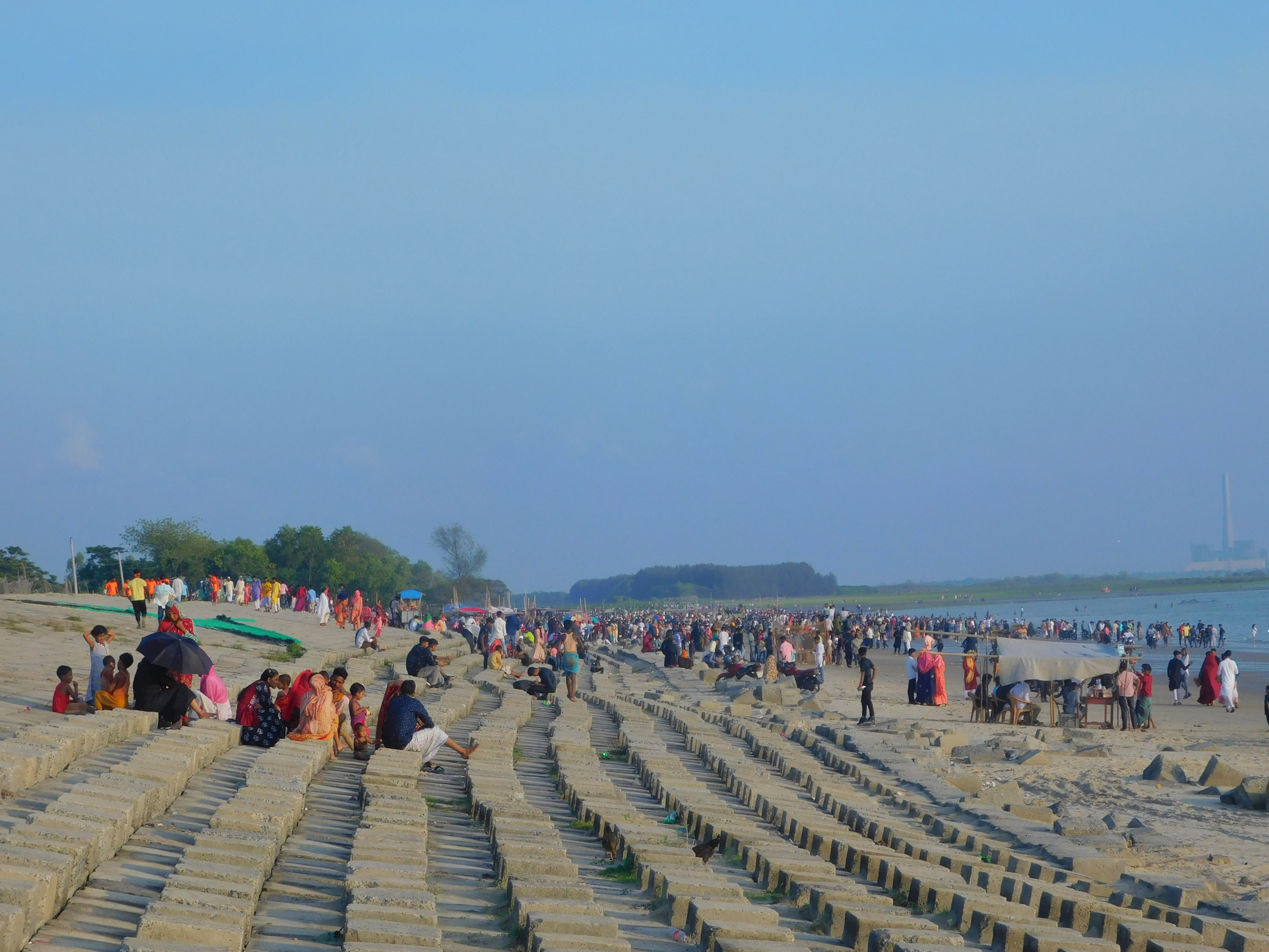
Khankhanabad Point

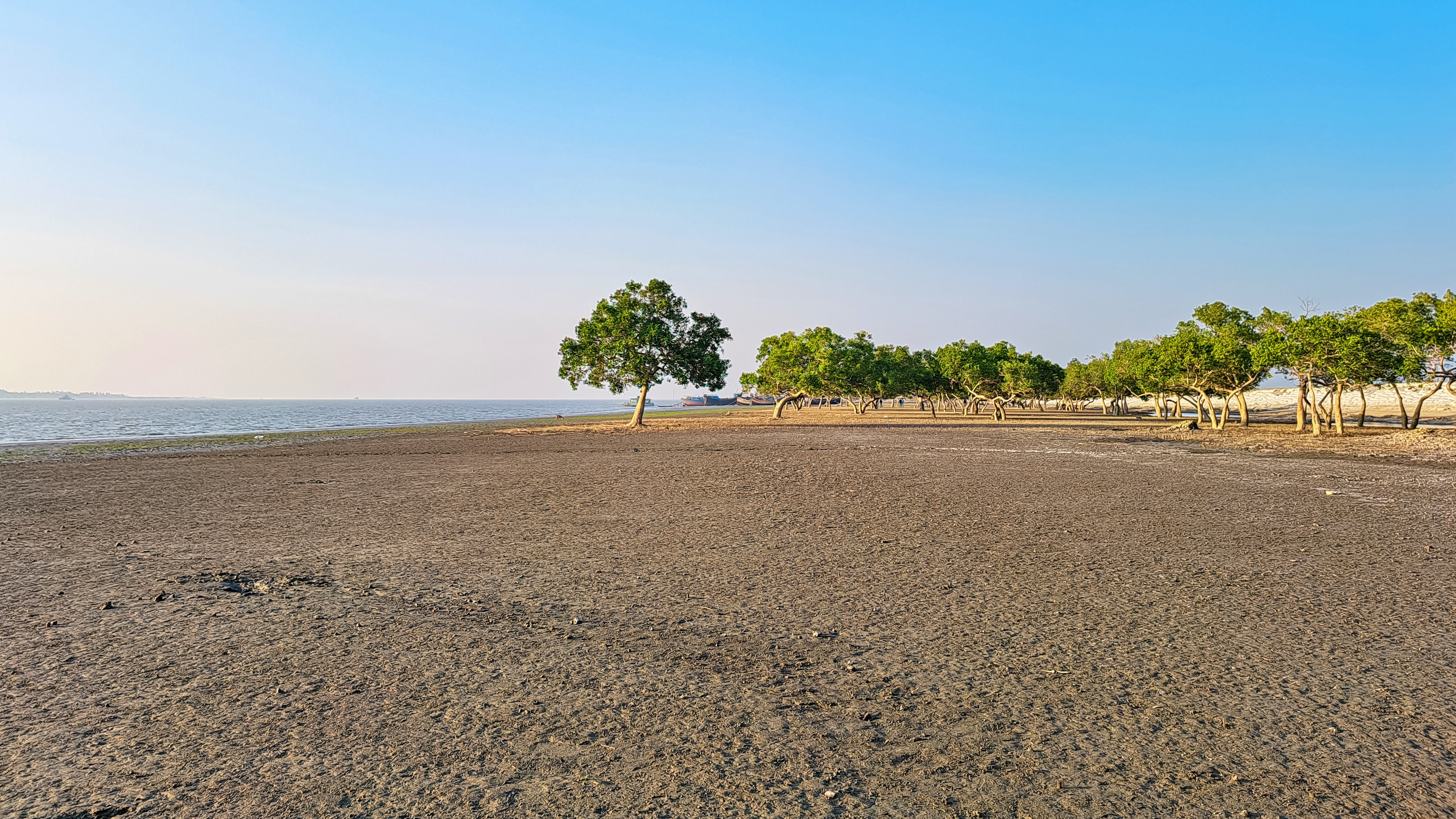
Chanua Point

== See also ==
- List of beaches in Bangladesh
