= Mandarbaria Beach =

Beach in Sathikra, Bangladesh

Coordinates: 21.7412°N 89.0928°E

- Location: Bangladesh, Khulna, Satkhira

Mandarbaria Beach (Bengali: মান্দারবাড়িয়া সমুদ্র সৈকত) is a beach in Bangladesh in Shyamnagar Upazila of the Satkhira District. The beach is not a popular destination for tourists or locals. It is an 17-kilometre-long (11 mi) beach near the forest in the same name. The banks of the Hariabhanga River can be seen from the beach. The Sundarbans mangrove forest is located at one end of the beach. It is part of Sundarbans.
