= Greater Chittagong =

Historic district of Bangladesh

Greater Chittagong বৃহত্তর চট্টগ্রাম
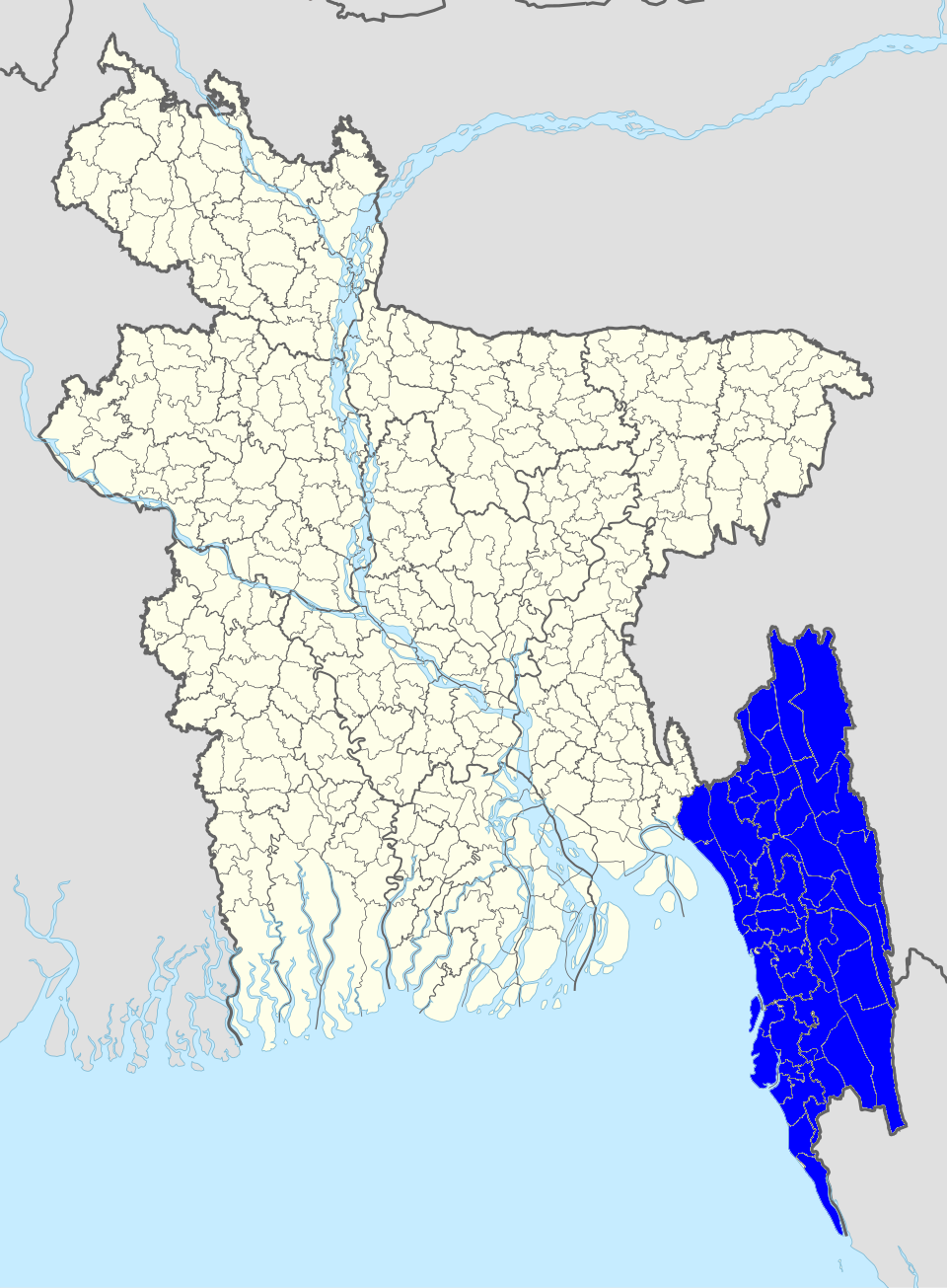
- Greater Chittagong, Bangladesh
- Country: Bangladesh
- Districts: Chittagong District; Cox's Bazar District; Bandarban District; Khagrachhari District; Rangamati District

Area
  - Total: 21,119.07 km^{2} (8,154.12 sq mi)

Population (2022)
  - Total: 13,835,544
  - Density: 655.1209/km^{2} (1,696.755/sq mi)

Demographics
  - Ethnicities: Bengalis, Chakmas, Marmas, Rakhine, Tripura, Mros, Tanchangyas, Bawm, Chak, Khyang, Khumi, Pankho, Lushei
  - Religions (2022 census): 83.24% Islam; 9.11% Hinduism; 6.95% Buddhism; 0.51% Christianity; 0.19% Others
- Time zone: UTC+06:00 (Bangladesh Standard Time)

Greater Chittagong is a historic region of Bangladesh that was established as a district in 1666. The region is known for its natural landscapes and for its distinctive Chittagonian language and culture.

== History ==
The region of Greater Chittagong came under the control of the Mughal Empire in 1666 following the Mughal conquest of Chittagong, after which the area was organized as the Chittagong District. During the Mughal period and early British rule, the district included both the coastal plains and the hill regions to the east.

In 1860, the British colonial administration separated the hill areas from the district and created the Chittagong Hill Tracts as a distinct administrative district under Act XXII of 1860. The remaining plains area continued to be administered as Chittagong District.

In 1984, a major administrative reorganization divided Chittagong District and created Cox's Bazar District. The former Chittagong Hill Tracts district was later subdivided into three districts: Rangamati District, Khagrachhari District, and Bandarban District. These districts together with Chittagong and Cox's Bazar are collectively referred to as Greater Chittagong.

== Administration ==
Greater Chittagong is the southeastern part of Chittagong Division and consists of five districts. The region includes one city corporation, Chittagong City Corporation, and 50 upazilas.

Chittagong District

Mirsharai Upazila Fatikchhari Upazila Sandwip Upazila Sitakunda Upazila Hathazari Upazila Raozan Upazila Rangunia Upazila Karnaphuli Upazila Boalkhali Upazila Patiya Upazila Anwara Upazila Chandanaish Upazila Satkania Upazila Banshkhali Upazila Lohagara Upazila

Cox's Bazar District

Kutubdia Upazila Pekua Upazila Maheshkhali Upazila Chakaria Upazila Cox's Bazar Sadar Upazila Eidgaon Upazila Ramu Upazila Ukhia Upazila Teknaf Upazila

Rangamati District

Rangamati Sadar Upazila Belaichhari Upazila Bagaichhari Upazila Barkal Upazila Juraichhari Upazila Rajasthali Upazila Kaptai Upazila Langadu Upazila Naniarchar Upazila Kaukhali Upazila

Khagrachhari District

Dighinala Upazila Khagrachhari Sadar Upazila Lakshmichhari Upazila Mahalchhari Upazila Manikchhari Upazila Matiranga Upazila Panchhari Upazila Ramgarh Upazila Guimara Upazila

Bandarban District

Alikadam Upazila Bandarban Sadar Upazila Lama Upazila Naikhongchhari Upazila Rowangchhari Upazila Ruma Upazila Thanchi Upazila

== Language and culture ==
The vast majority of people in Greater Chittagong speak the Chittagonian language. Chittagonian is spoken by most residents of Chittagong District and Cox's Bazar District, and it is also widely spoken by Chittagonians living in the Chittagong Hill Tracts.

Several ethnic minority communities in the hill districts speak their own languages. For example, the Chakma people speak the Chakma language, the Marma people and Rakhine people speak the Rakhine language, the Tripuri people speak Kokborok, and the Bawm people speak the Bawm language.

== Demographics ==
According to the 2022 census, the total population of Greater Chittagong was 13,835,545. Of the population, 11,517,356 were Muslims, 1,260,089 were Hindus, 961,530 were Buddhists, 70,110 were Christians, and 26,459 followed other religions.

Religion-2022
1. Muslims (83.2%)
2. Hindus (9.11%)
3. Buddhists (6.95%)
4. Christians (0.51%)
5. Others (0.19%)

== Ethnic minorities ==
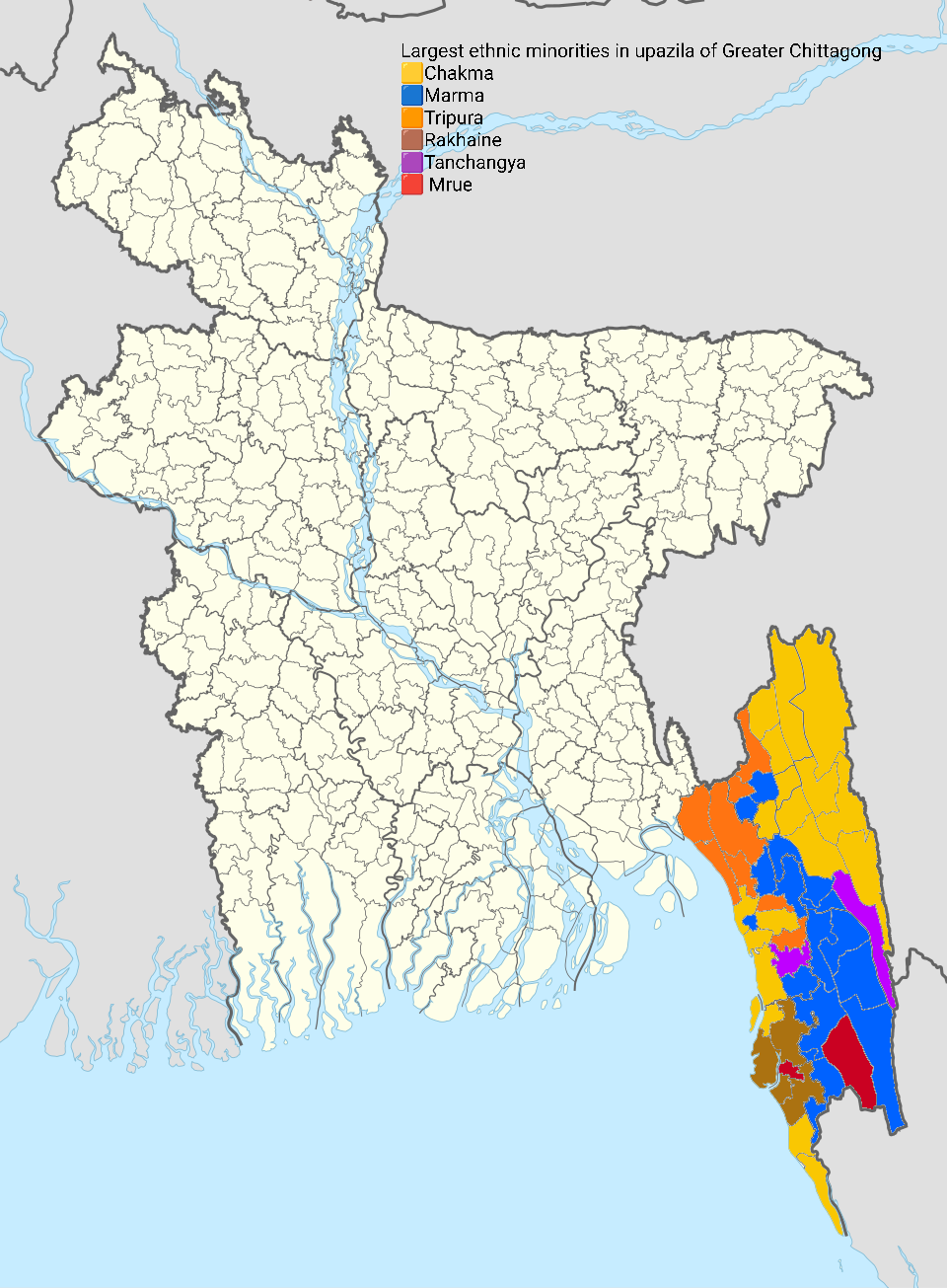
Largest ethnic minorities in upazilas of Greater Chittagong (census 2022)

Several ethnic minority groups live in Greater Chittagong. Their total population is 983,374, representing 7.11% of the region's population. Among them, the Chakmas number 474,352, the Marmas 219,452, the Tripuras 149,763, the Mrus 52,004, the Tanchangyas 45,594, the Boms 12,490, and the Rakhaines 8,805, while other groups together account for 20,914 people.

Ethnic Minorities in the Greater Chittagong (excluding Chittagonians/Bengali) (2022)
1. Chakma (48.2%)
2. Marma (22.3%)
3. Tripura (15.2%)
4. Mro (5.29%)
5. Tanchangya (4.64%)
6. Bom (1.27%)
7. Rakhaine (0.90%)
8. Others (2.13%)

== Tourists spot ==
=== Beaches ===
- Cox's Bazar Beach
- Teknaf Beach
- Inani Beach
- Kutubdia Beach
- Patenga Sea Beach
- Guliakhali Beach
- Parki Beach
- Kattali Beach
- Banshbaria Beach
- Banshkhali Beach

=== Islands ===
- Saint Martin's Island
- Chhera Island
- Kutubdia Island
- Moheshkhali Island
- Sonadia Island
- Matarbari Island
- Shah Porir Dwip
- Jaliardwip
- Sandwip Island

=== Waterfalls ===
- Nafakhum Waterfall
- Amiakhum Waterfall
- Rijuk Waterfall
- Zingsiam Saitar Waterfall
- Tinap Saitar Waterfall
- Jadipai Waterfall
- Damtua Waterfall
- Chingri Waterfall
- Khoiyachora Waterfall
- Shahasradhara Waterfall
- Suptadhara Waterfall
- Twisama Waterfall
- Toiduchara Waterfall
- Toilafang Waterfall
- Tuari Mairang Waterfall
- Ghagra Teima Waterfall
- Dhuppani Waterfall
- Muppochora Waterfall

=== Lakes ===
- Kaptai Lake
- Foy's Lake
- Boga Lake
- Mahamaya Lake

=== Hills ===
- Tazing Dong
- Keokradong
- Saka Haphong
- Dim Pahar
- Debotakhum
- Alutila Cave
- Mayung Kopal
- Sajek Valley
- Dumlong
- Chandranath Hill
- DC Hill, Chattogram
- Batali Hill

=== Park ===
- Jamboree Park
- Biplob Udyan
- Chittagong War Cemetery
- Foy's Lake Concord
- Naf Tourism Park
- Dulhazra Safari Park

=== Reserve Forest ===
- Himchari National Park
- Inani National Park
- Medhakachhapia National Park
- Kaptai National Park
- Baroiyadhala National Park
- Aviary and Eco-Park, Rangunia
- Botanical Garden and Eco-Park, Sitakunda
- Fasiakhali Wildlife Sanctuary
- Teknaf Wildlife Sanctuary
- Chunati Wildlife Sanctuary
- Hazarikhil Wildlife Sanctuary
- Dudpukuria-Dhopachari Wildlife Sanctuary
- Sangu Matamuhari Wildlife Sanctuary
- Baishari Bangdepa Wildlife Sanctuary
- Pablakhali Wildlife Sanctuary

=== Museums ===
- Chittagong University Museum
- Ethnological Museum, Chittagong
- Zia Memorial Museum
- Bangladesh Railway Museum
- Bangladesh Maritime Museum

=== Religious places ===
- Anderkilla Shahi Jame Mosque
- Wali Khan Mosque
- Jamiatul Falah Mosque
- Chandanpura Mosque
- Asgar Ali Chowdhury Jame Mosque
- Chandgaon Mosque
- Faqir Mosque
- Shaheb Bibi Mosque
- Shrine of Bayazid Bostami
- Ajgobi Mosque
- Buddha Dhatu Jadi
- Pandit Vihara
- Ramkot Banashram
- Adinath Temple, Maheshkhali
- Chandranath Temple
- Chatteshwari Temple

=== Others ===
- Cox's Bazar–Teknaf Marine Drive
- Shah Amanat Bridge
- Kaptai Dam
- Nandirhat Zamindar Bari
- City Gate, Chittagong
- Lal Dighi, Chittagong

== See also ==
- Chittagong
- Chittagong Division
- Chittagonian language
