= Naniarchar =

Naniarchar may refer to:

- Naniarchar Upazila, an upazila of Rangamati District
- Naniarchar Union, a union of Naniarchar Upazila under Rangamati District
