= Ghilachhari Union =

Ghilachhari Union is an union in Rangamati District, Bangladesh. It may refer to:

- Ghilachhari Union, Rajasthali, an union in Rajasthali Upazila
- Ghilachhari Union, Naniarchar, an union in Naniarchar Upazila
