= Sabekkyong Union =

Union of Rangamati District, Chittagong, Bangladesh

Sabekkyong সাবেক্ষ্যং
- Union
- Interactive map of Sabekkyong
- Country: Bangladesh
- Division: Chittagong Division
- District: Rangamati District
- Upazila: Naniarchar Upazila

Area
  - Total: 119.14 km^{2} (46.00 sq mi)

Population (2022)
  - Total: 11,594
  - Density: 97.314/km^{2} (252.04/sq mi)
- Time zone: UTC+6 (BST)
- Postal code: 4520
- Website: sabekkhongup.rangamati.gov.bd

Sabekkyong Union is a union of Naniarchar Upazila under Rangamati District.

== Demography ==
According to 2022 census, total population of the Union are 11,594. Among them, 24 are Muslim, 11,555 are Buddhist, 10 are Christian and 5 are Hindu.

Religion-2022
1. Buddhism (99.7%)
2. Islam (0.21%)
3. Christianity (0.09%)
4. Hinduism (0.04%)
5. Others (0.00%)

== Ethnicity ==
This Union is home to a variety of different ethnic groups. Among them, 116 are Bengali, 11,471 are Chakma and 7 are of others ethnic groups.

Ethnicity-2022
1. Chakma (98.9%)
2. Bengali (1.00%)
3. Others (0.06%)
