= Burighat Union =

Union of Rangamati District, Chittagong, Bangladesh

Burighat বুড়িঘাট
- Union
- Interactive map of Burighat
- Country: Bangladesh
- Division: Chittagong Division
- District: Rangamati District
- Upazila: Naniarchar Upazila

Area
  - Total: 85.47 km^{2} (33.00 sq mi)

Population (2022)
  - Total: 13,830
  - Density: 161.8/km^{2} (419.1/sq mi)
- Time zone: UTC+6 (BST)
- Postal code: 4520
- Website: burighatup.rangamati.gov.bd

Burighat Union is a union of Naniarchar Upazila under Rangamati District.

== Demography ==
According to 2022 census, total population of the Union are 10,830. Among them, 5,938 are Muslim, 7,842 are Buddhist and 60 follow others religion.

Religion-2022
1. Buddhism (56.7%)
2. Islam (42.9%)
3. Others (0.44%)

== Ethnicity ==
This Union is home to a variety of different ethnic groups. Among them, 6,145 are Bengali, 6,893 are Chakma, 759 are Marma and 24 are of others ethnic groups.

Ethnicity-2022
1. Chakma (49.8%)
2. Bengali (44.5%)
3. Marma (5.49%)
4. Others (0.17%)
