= Twisama Waterfall =

Twaisama Waterfall (Bengali: তৈছামা ঝর্ণা) is located in Dighinala, Khagrachhari District, Bangladesh. It is one of the newly discovered waterfalls in Khagrachhari and is situated in a very remote area.

== Location ==
The waterfall is situated in Bishnu Kabari Tripura Para of Merung Union, Dighinala Upazila, Khagrachhari District.

To reach this waterfall, one must first travel by CNG or Mahendra from Khagrachhari town to Dighinala Bazar, and from there to Bishnu Kabari Para in Merung Union. It takes about one hour to reach Twaisama Waterfall, and the journey involves crossing a challenging path. On the way, travelers encounter small and large hills, jhum fields, and rocky trails.
