= Dim Pahar =

Hill loacated in Bandarban District, Bangladesh

Coordinates: 21.7350°N 92.4210°E

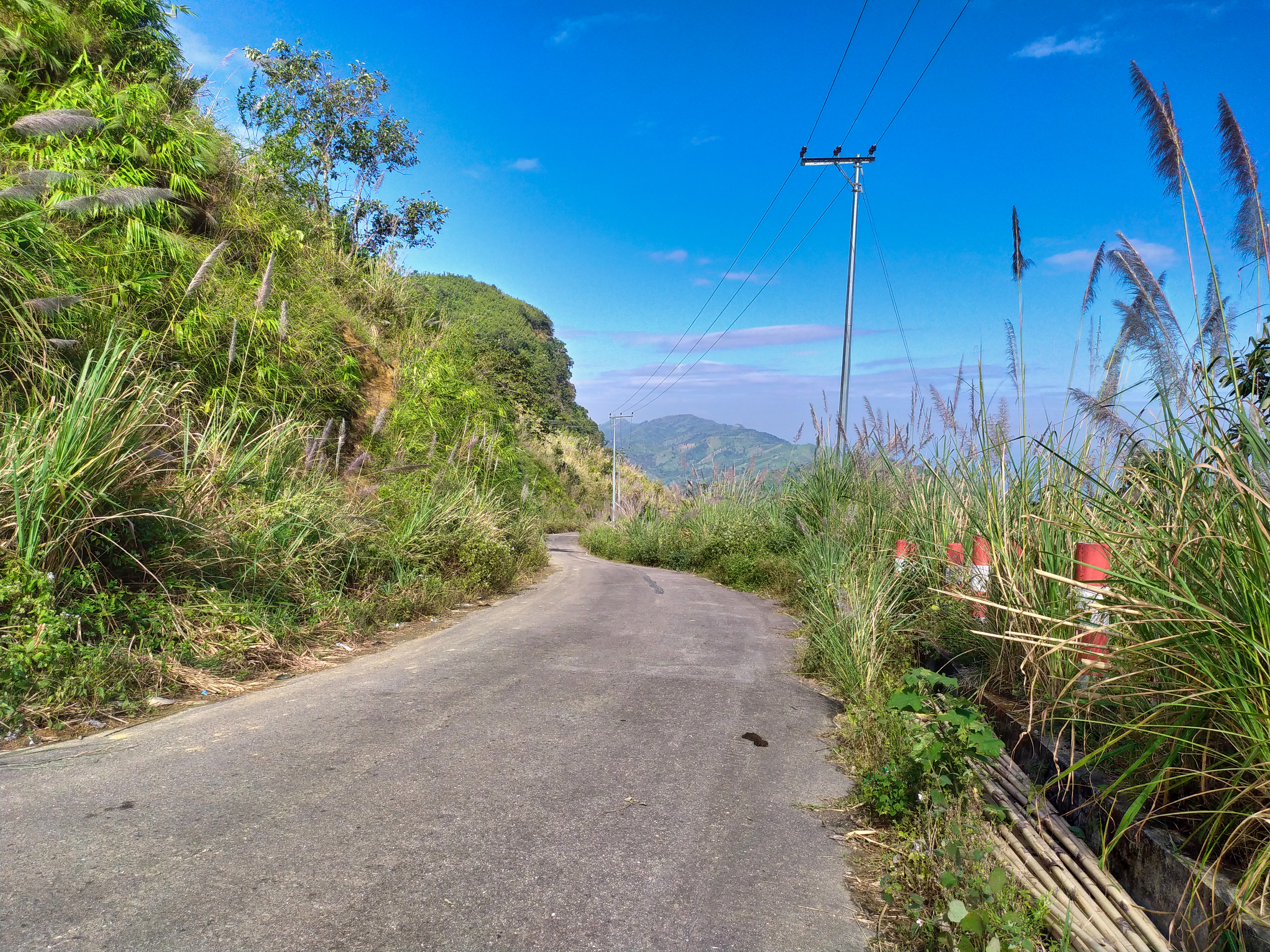
Dim Pahar Road

Ḍim Pāhāṛ (Bengali: ডিম পাহাড়, lit. 'Egg Hill') is a hill located in Bandarban District, Bangladesh. The hill is located right in the middle of Ali Kadam and Thanchi upazilas. The boundaries of the two upazilas have been determined by this hill. The highest road of Bangladesh has been built through this hill at an altitude of 2,500 feet above sea level. At an altitude of 2,500 feet, the hilltop is shaped like an egg, so the locals call it Dim Pahar, which means "Egg Hill" in Bengali.

== Description ==
Before road construction, Dim Pahar was very inaccessible. The engineering department of Bangladesh Army has worked for a decade to build the road. The construction of this 35 km long road has cost Tk 120 crore. The Roads and Highways Department of the government of Bangladesh initially started construction of the road, but later it was completed by 16 ECB and 17 ECB of the Army's Engineering Department. Ali Kadam-Thanchi Regional Road is the highest road of Bangladesh. From Ali Kadam, this road starts to rise upwards and the height of the road in Dim Pahar is 2,500 feet.
