= Asgar Ali Chowdhury Jame Mosque =

Mosque in Chittagong, Bangladesh

- আজগর আলী চৌধুরী জামে মসজিদ
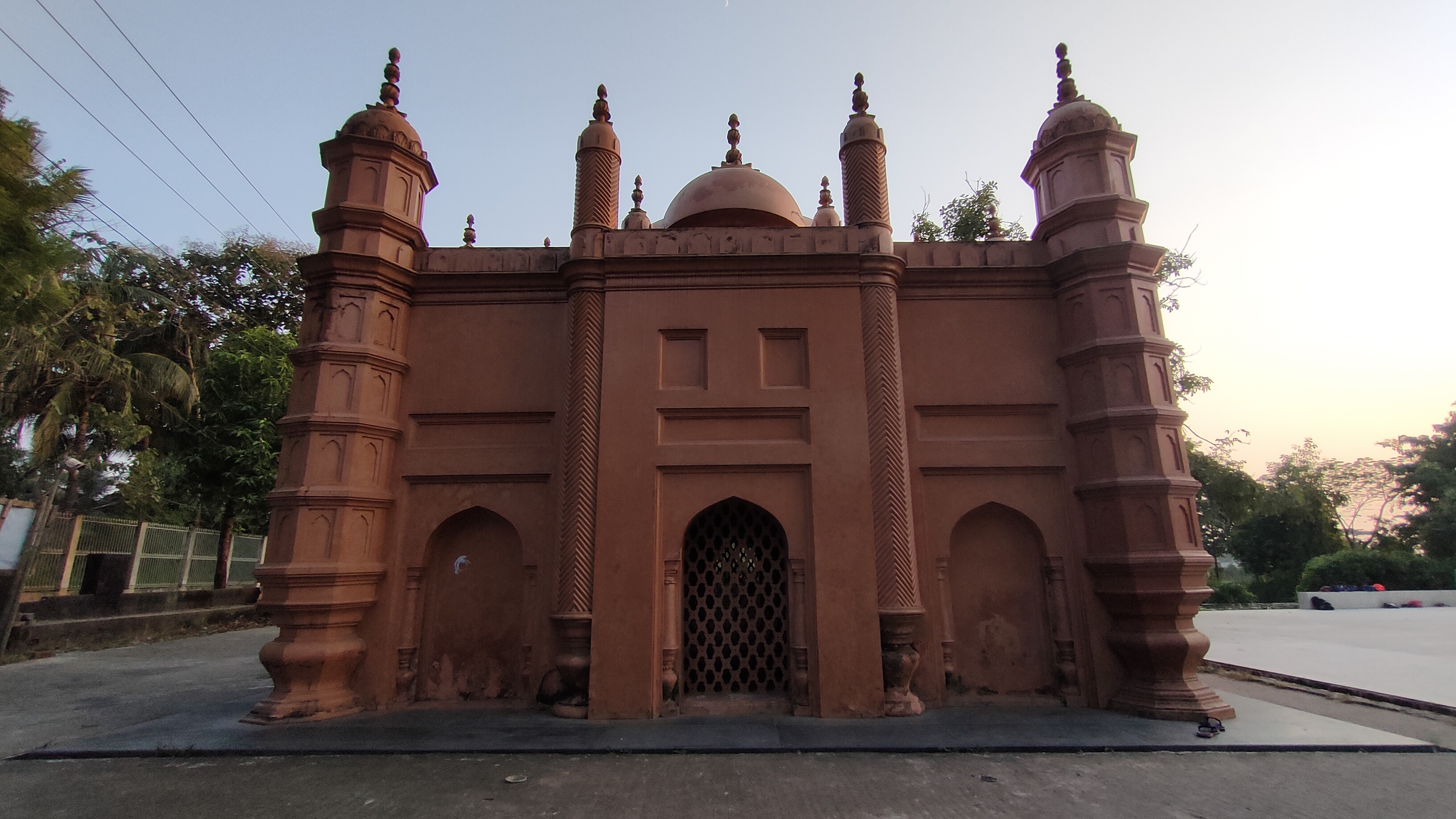
- Old building, built in 1795

- Location of the mosque in Bangladesh

Religion
- Affiliation: Islam
- Ecclesiastical or organizational status: Friday mosque
- Governing body: Chowdhury family
- Status: Active

Location
- Location: Chowdhury Para Road, Halishahar, Chittagong Division
- Country: Bangladesh
- Interactive map of Asgar Ali Chowdhury Jame Mosque
- Coordinates: 22°19′34″N 91°46′24″E

Architecture
- Type: Mosque architecture
- Style: Mughal
- Founder: Asgar Ali Chowdhury
- Established: 1795 (1st structure); 2016 (new structure)

Specifications
- Capacity: 31 worshipers
- Dome: Three
- Minaret: 24
- Materials: Limestone

The Asgar Ali Chowdhury Jame Mosque is a very small Friday mosque located at Chowdhury Para Road, Halisahar, Chittagong in the Chittagong Division of Bangladesh. The mosque was founded by Asgar Ali Chowdhury, who was from the elite Chowdhury family of Halishahar.

== History ==
Ali Asgar Chowdhury built the mosque in 1795, basing the design on Mughal architecture. By 2016, due to size and its old condition, it had become impossible to pray because of population growth, so the Chowdhury family built another mosque there. The amount of five million taka was provided as funding by the Chowdhury family for repairs and to build a new one. The repairs were done by Arbana Architect group. During these repairs, a Chowdhury family built a separate building for the displaced worshippers; the new building stands on 70 shatak of land and cost 40 million taka.

== Architecture ==
The mosque is modelled after the Taj Mahal. The windowless structure has 24 minarets and three large domes located on the rooftop.

The new structure's modern design, with water surrounding it, gives the illusion that it is floating on the water. The design was approved by the Jatiya Sangsad of Bangladesh.

There is a graveyard to the south and a 100 shatak pond in front of the mosque. The new building is to the west.

== Gallery ==
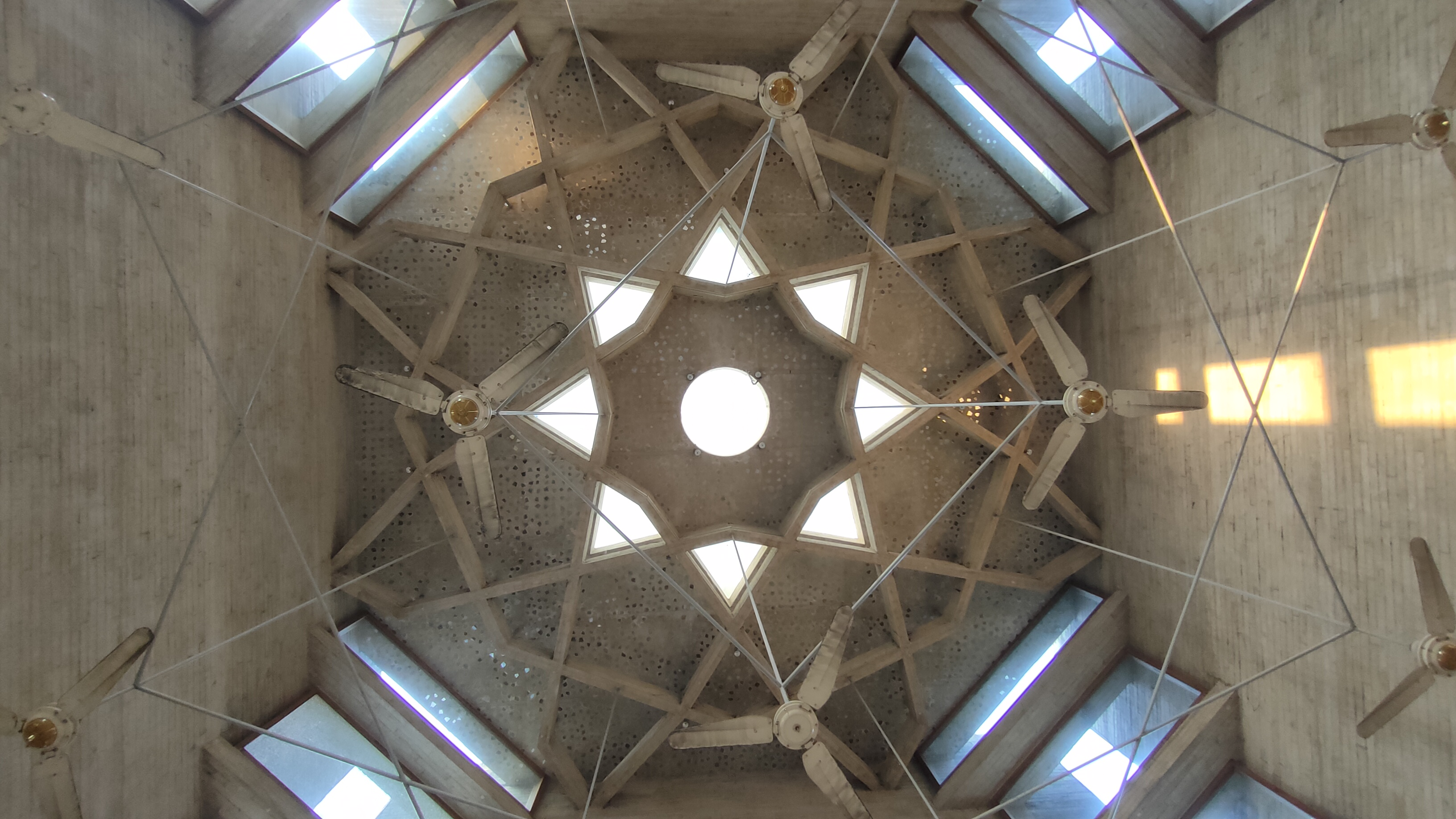
Rooftop of the new building

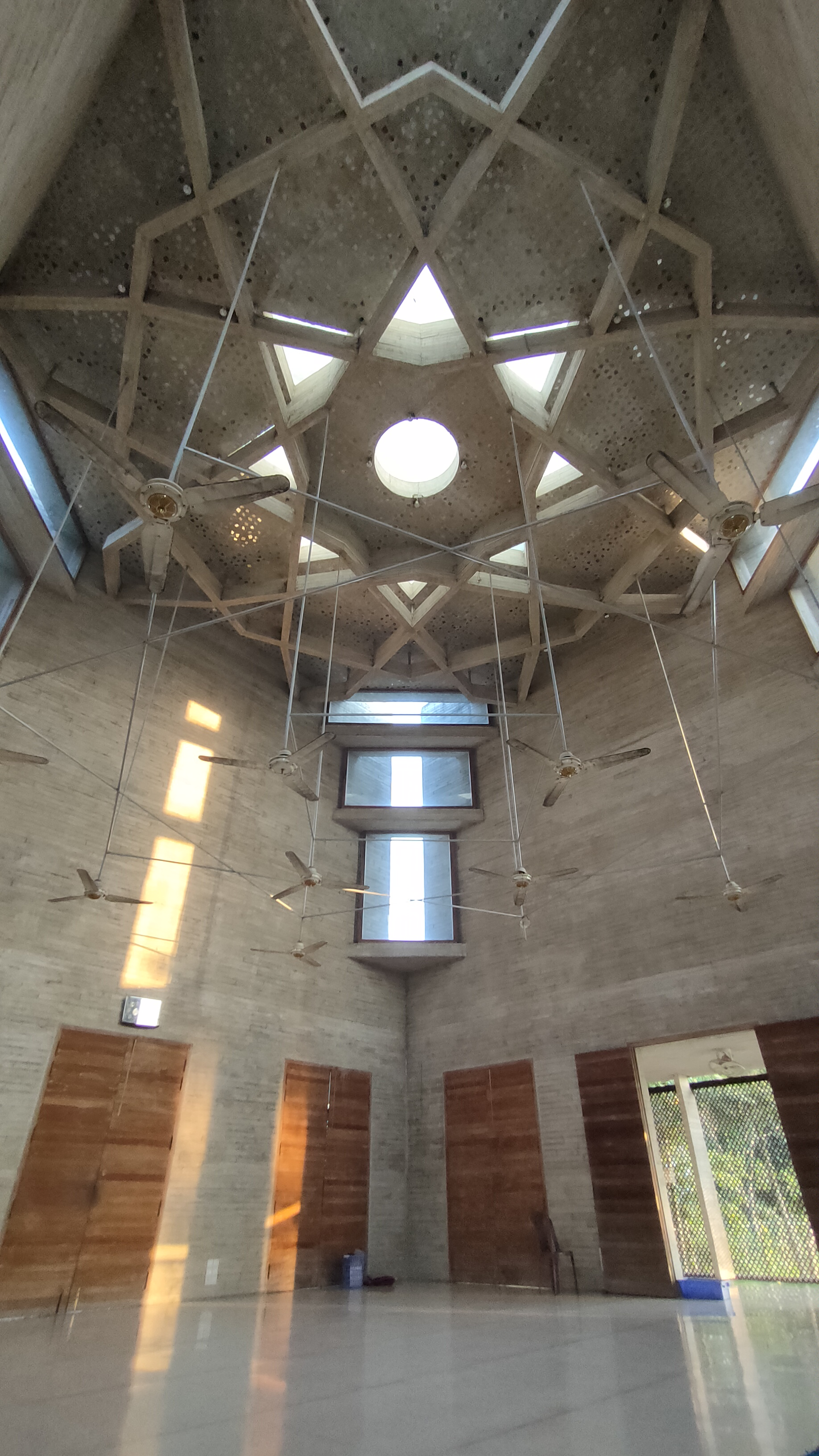
Rooftop with corner of the new building

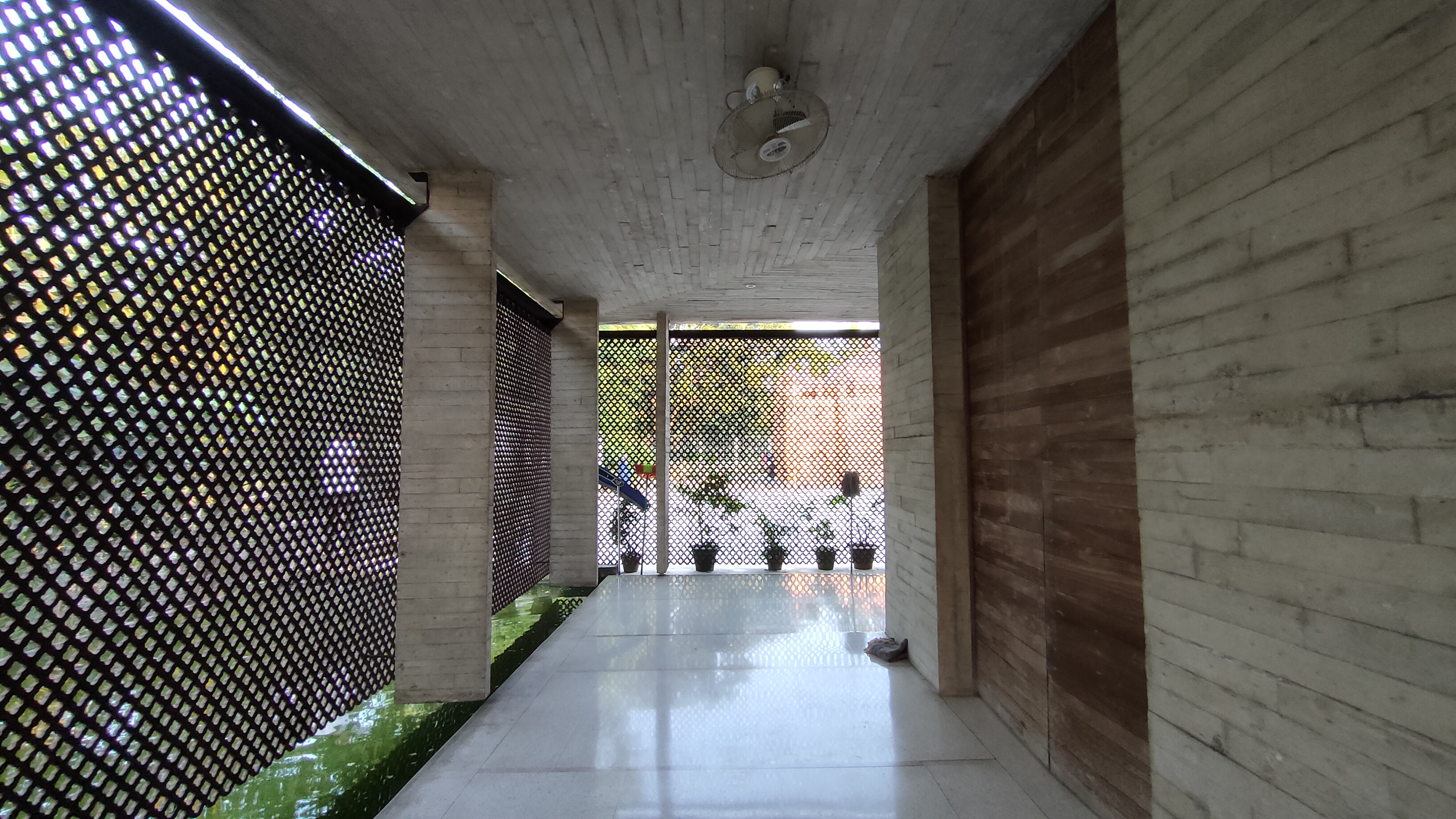
Verandah of the new building

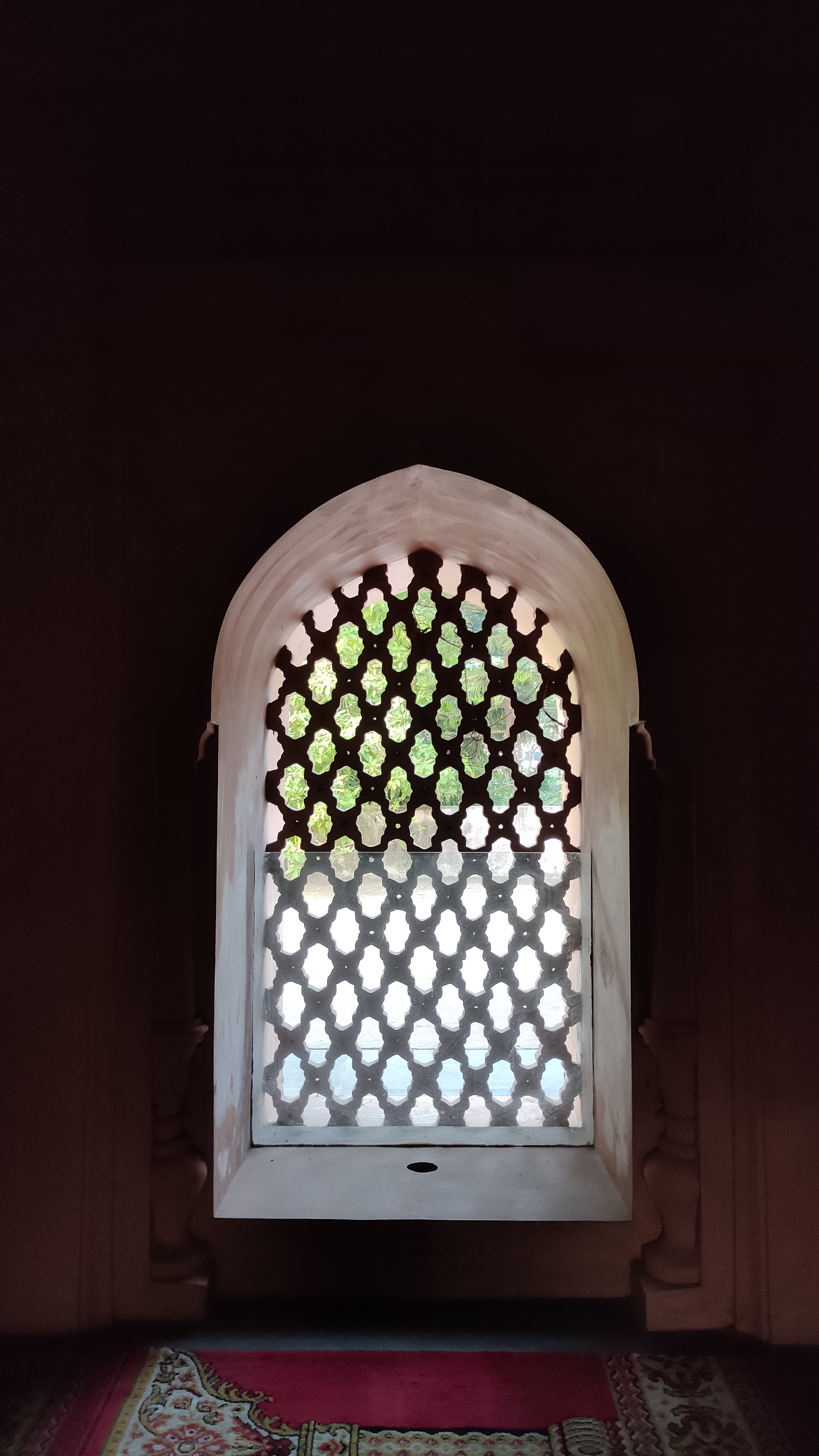
Old building window

== See also ==
- Islam in Bangladesh
- List of mosques in Bangladesh
