= Toilafang Waterfall =

Toilafang Waterfall is located in Matiranga Upazila of Khagrachhari District, Bangladesh. It is one of the newly discovered waterfalls in Khagrachhari. During the rainy season, the water flow increases compared to other times of the year.

== Location ==
The waterfall is situated in Katalmoni Tripura Para of Matiranga Upazila, Khagrachhari District. It is about 50 feet high and 20 feet wide.

There are several routes to reach this waterfall. One way is through Tablachhari of Matiranga Upazila, and another is through Moratila of Panchhari Upazila. From Khagrachhari town, visitors can take a CNG or Mahendra vehicle to reach the Katalmoni Para–Bhaibonchhara connecting road. From there, Katalmoni Para is about 6–7 kilometers away.
