= Ghagra Teima Waterfall =

Ghagra Teima Waterfall is located in Ghagra of Kawkhali Upazila, Rangamati District, Bangladesh. It is one of the attractive waterfalls of Rangamati District. The waterfall is situated in the Kalabagan area, about 3–4 kilometers ahead of the Ghagra Army Camp on the Rangamati road.

== Location ==
The waterfall is located in the Kalabagan area of Ghagra in Kawkhali Upazila, Rangamati District, on the Chattogram–Rangamati highway. From the main road in Ghagra’s Kalabagan area, crossing a small stream on the left and walking about two to two and a half kilometers leads to the main waterfall.

On the way to and from Ghagra Waterfall, one can see around 5–6 small and large waterfalls. The trail to the waterfall is a bit slippery, and water flows through it throughout the monsoon season.
