= Zingsiam Saitar Waterfall =

Waterfall in Bangladesh

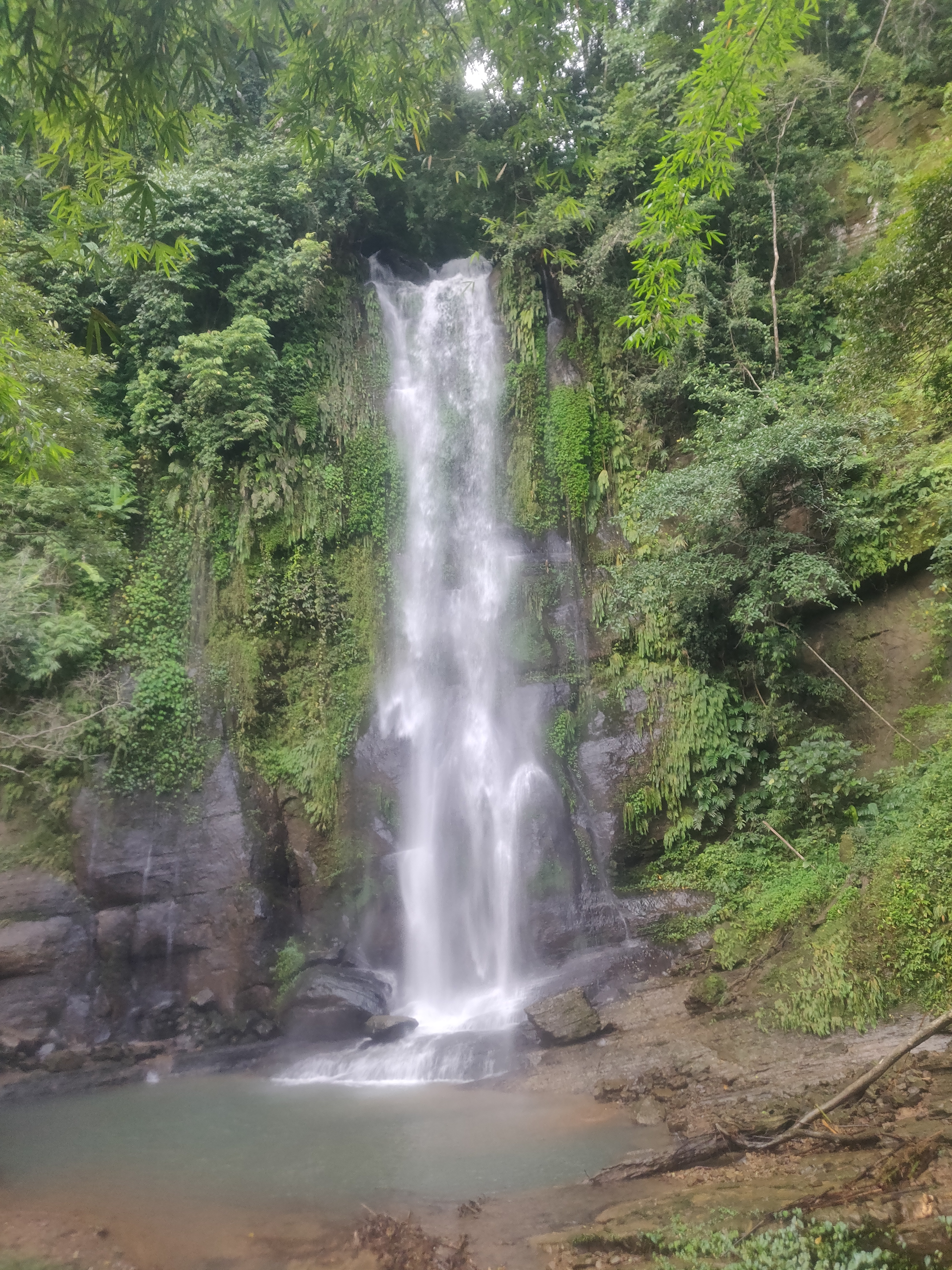
The first step of Jingsiam

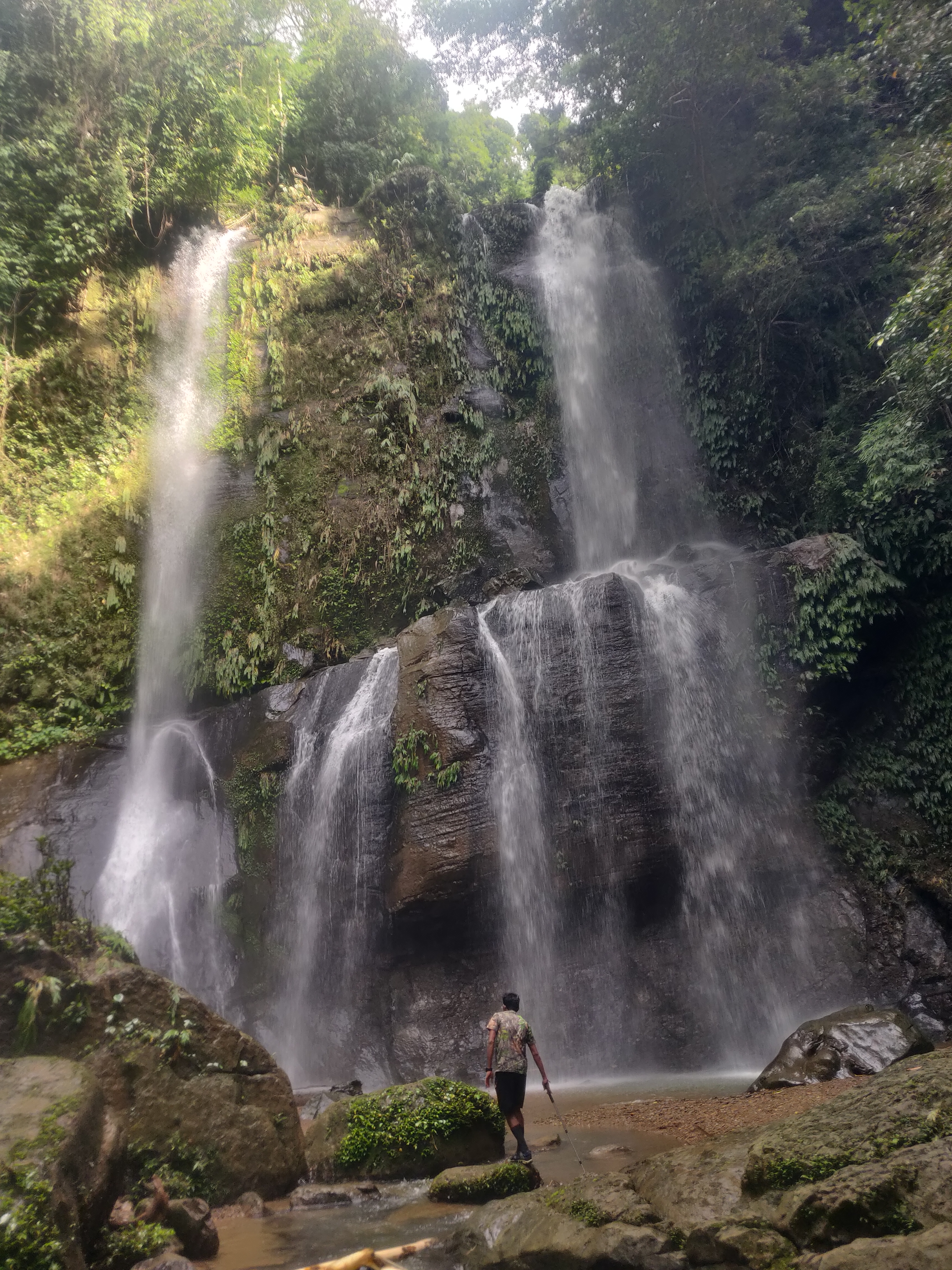
The second step of Jingsiam

Jingsiam Saita Waterfall is a waterfall located near Ruma Para in Ruma Upazila, Bandarban District, Bangladesh.

== Etymology ==
A tragic story is associated with the naming of this waterfall, preserved in the oral history of Ruma Para. According to local accounts, a mentally unstable girl left the village after quarreling with her mother. Despite day-long searching, villagers could not find her. That night, her lifeless body was discovered at the bottom of the second step of the waterfall. The body was later recovered and brought back to the village. It is believed that she accidentally slipped from the top, leading to her death. Since then, the waterfall has been called Jingsiam after the girl.

== Structure ==
The waterfall consists of three steps. Although the exact measurements have never been taken, each step is estimated to be about 80–100 feet high.

== Hazards ==
The path to the waterfall involves crossing many slippery rocks, which makes it dangerous, as slipping can cause injuries. In addition, visitors must cross a small stream that often experiences flash floods during the rainy season.

== Gallery ==
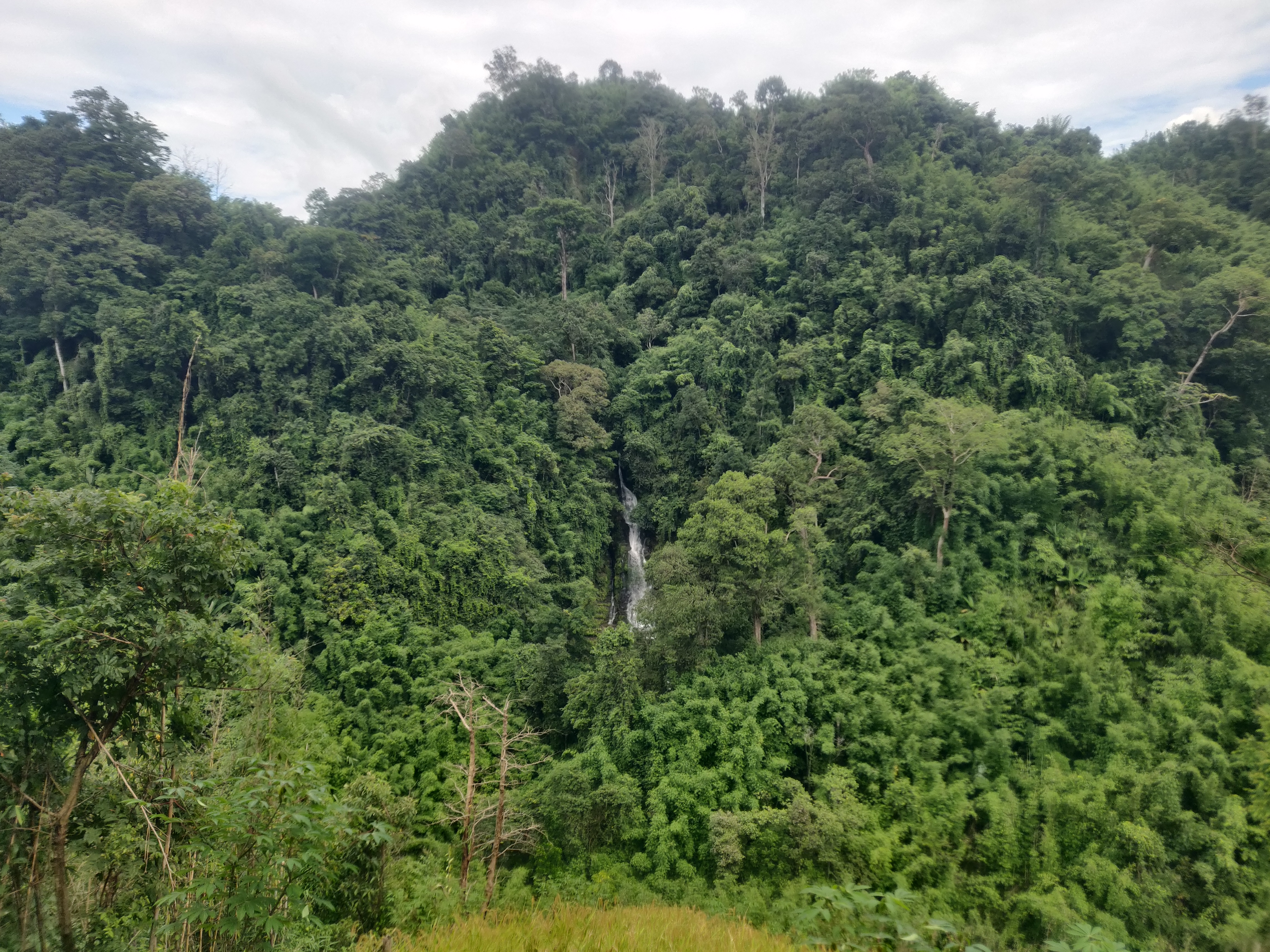
Jingsiam seen from Lun Thaosi Para's Jhum field

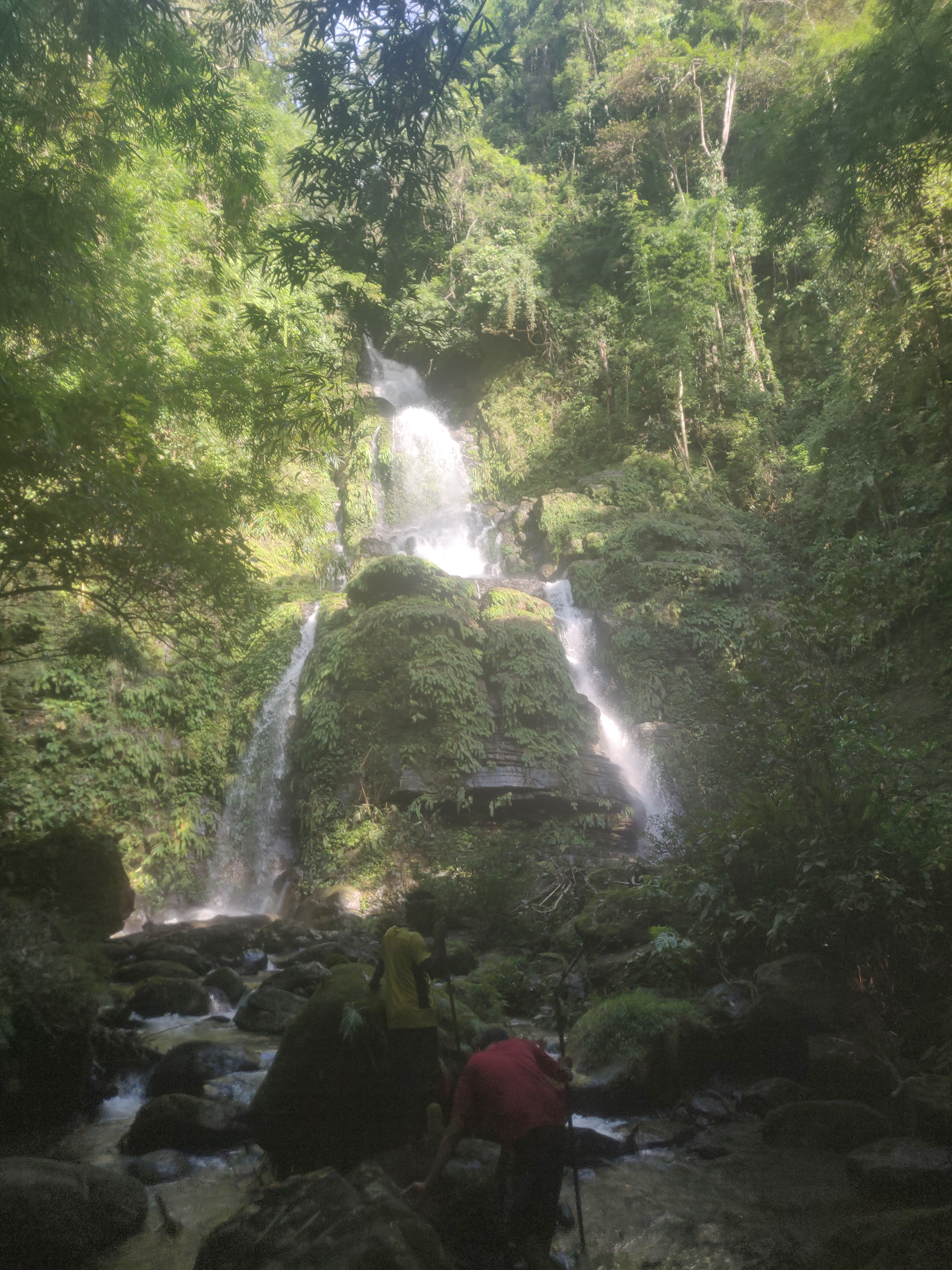
The third step of Jingsiam (first from the bottom)
