= Baroiyadhala National Park =

National park of Bangladesh

- IUCN category II (national park)
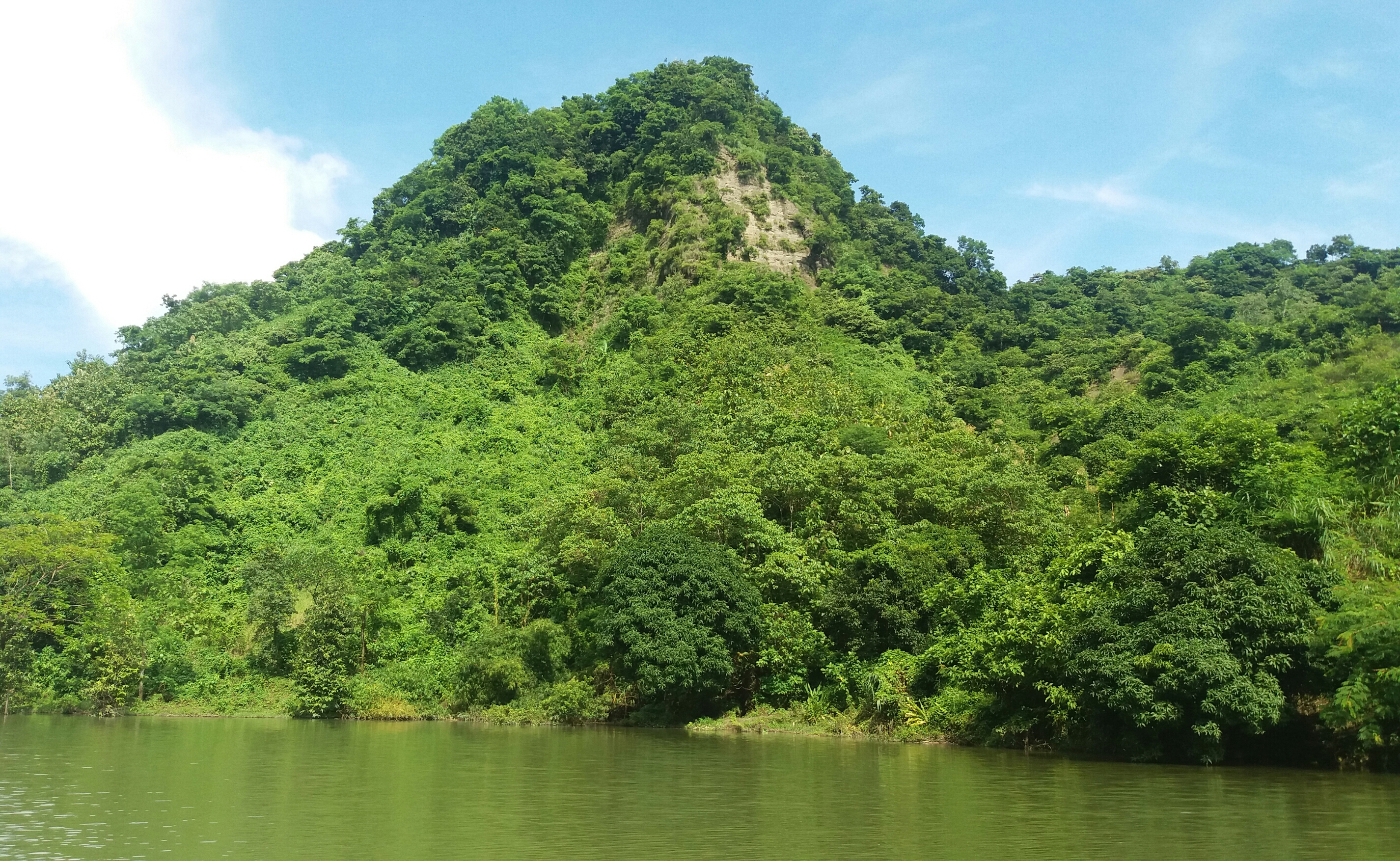
- Interactive map of Baroiyadhala National Park
- Location: Chittagong, Bangladesh
- Coordinates: 22.6544°N 91.6683°E
- Area: 2,933.61 ha (7,249.1 acres)
- Established: 6 April 2010; 16 years ago

Baroiyadhala National Park (Bengali: বাড়ৈয়াঢালা জাতীয় উদ্যান) is an IUCN Category II national park and nature reserve in Bangladesh. The park is located at Sitakunda Upazila, Chittagong District in the east site of the Dhaka-Chittagong Highway. It provides important wildlife corridors for disappearing flora and fauna of Bangladesh. Khoiyachora Waterfall is located inside the Baroiyadhala National Park.

The park was officially declared as a national park by the government of Bangladesh on 6 April 2010. It covers an area of 2933.61 hectares. Fauna of this park includes mainland serow, barking deer, marbled cat, Assamese macaque, Chinese pangolin, kalij pheasant and various other animals.

== Trails ==
List of trails within this park:

- Napittachora trail
- Komoldoho trail
