= DC Hill =

- Historical place
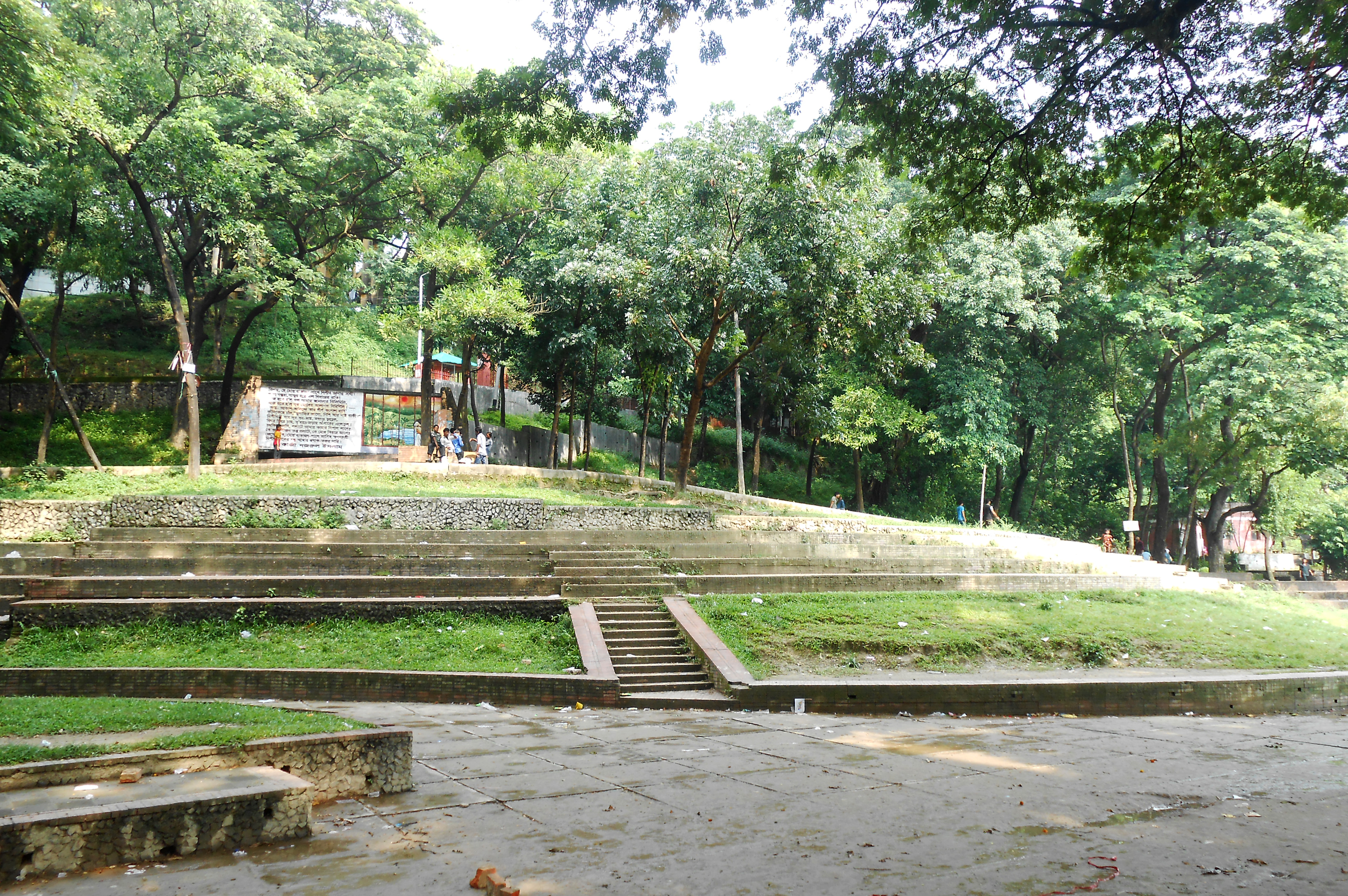
- DC Hill, Chattogram
- Nickname: DC Hill Park
- Interactive map of DC Hill
- Coordinates: 22°20′31″N 91°49′55″E
- Country: Bangladesh
- Division: Chittagong Division
- District: Chittagong District
- Place: Nandan Kanan

Government
  - Type: District administration
  - Body: District administration, Chittagong
  - Deputy commissioner: Farida Khanom
- Time zone: UTC+6 (BST)
- Website: portal.cda.gov.bd

DC Hill, also known as DC's Hill, is a location in the city of Chattogram, formally named Nazrul Chattar (Nazrul Square). At the top of this hill is the official residence of the Divisional Commissioner and the Deputy Commissioner (DC) of Chattogram. The hill is surrounded by many tall trees. Although there was once a decision to declare this place a park, it was never officially made into one. Every year during the Bengali New Year, DC Hill gains historical significance through the celebration of the Bengali national festival, Pohela Boishakh. In addition, various national and cultural events are held here, including stage plays and open-air film screenings. Additionally, hundreds of men and women gather here every morning and evening to walk or exercise.

== Location ==
DC Hill is located on Nandan Kanan Buddhist Temple Road in Chattogram. It is 1 km from the city center, Zero Point.

== History ==
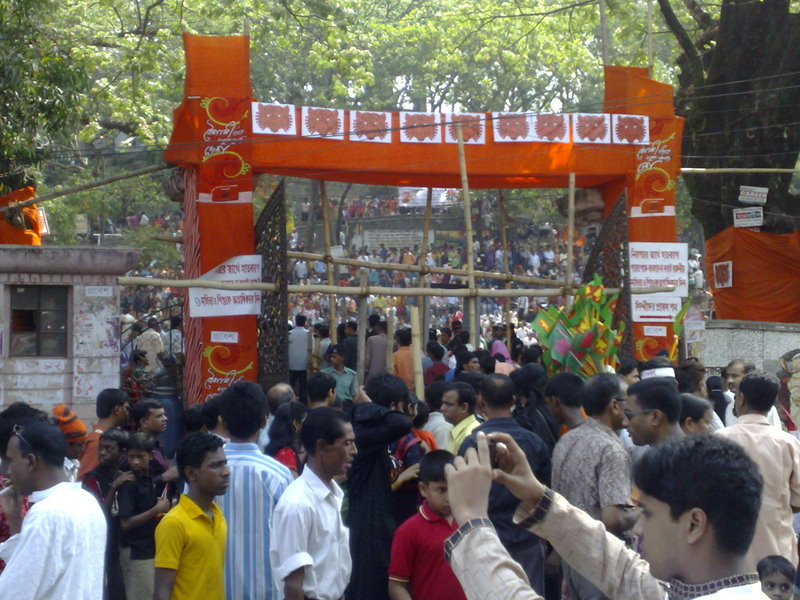
Pahela Boishakh (Bengali New Year) celebrations at DC Hill

In the early days of British rule, this place was home to the Chakma Raja. Subsequently, with the establishment of the Deputy Commissioner's (DC) residence here, this hill became widely known as DC Hill. The poet Kazi Nazrul Islam frequently visited this place during his lifetime to relax. To commemorate the visits of the national poet, on April 10, 2005, DC Hill was renamed Nazrul Chattar. Since the late 1970s, the New Year celebration, Pohela Boishakh, has been held here. Previously, the Pohela Boishakh celebration was held at the foot of Ispahani Hill, but in 1978, the event was moved to DC Hill Park. Those involved in the 1978 initiative included Wahidul Haque, Nirmal Mitra, Mihir Nandi, Arun Das Gupta, Abul Momen, Subhash Dey, and others. Initially, a squad was formed with two members from each organization to perform songs together. From 1980, the organizations started performing songs separately. Later, after the Group Theatre Federation joined, dramas were also included in the event.

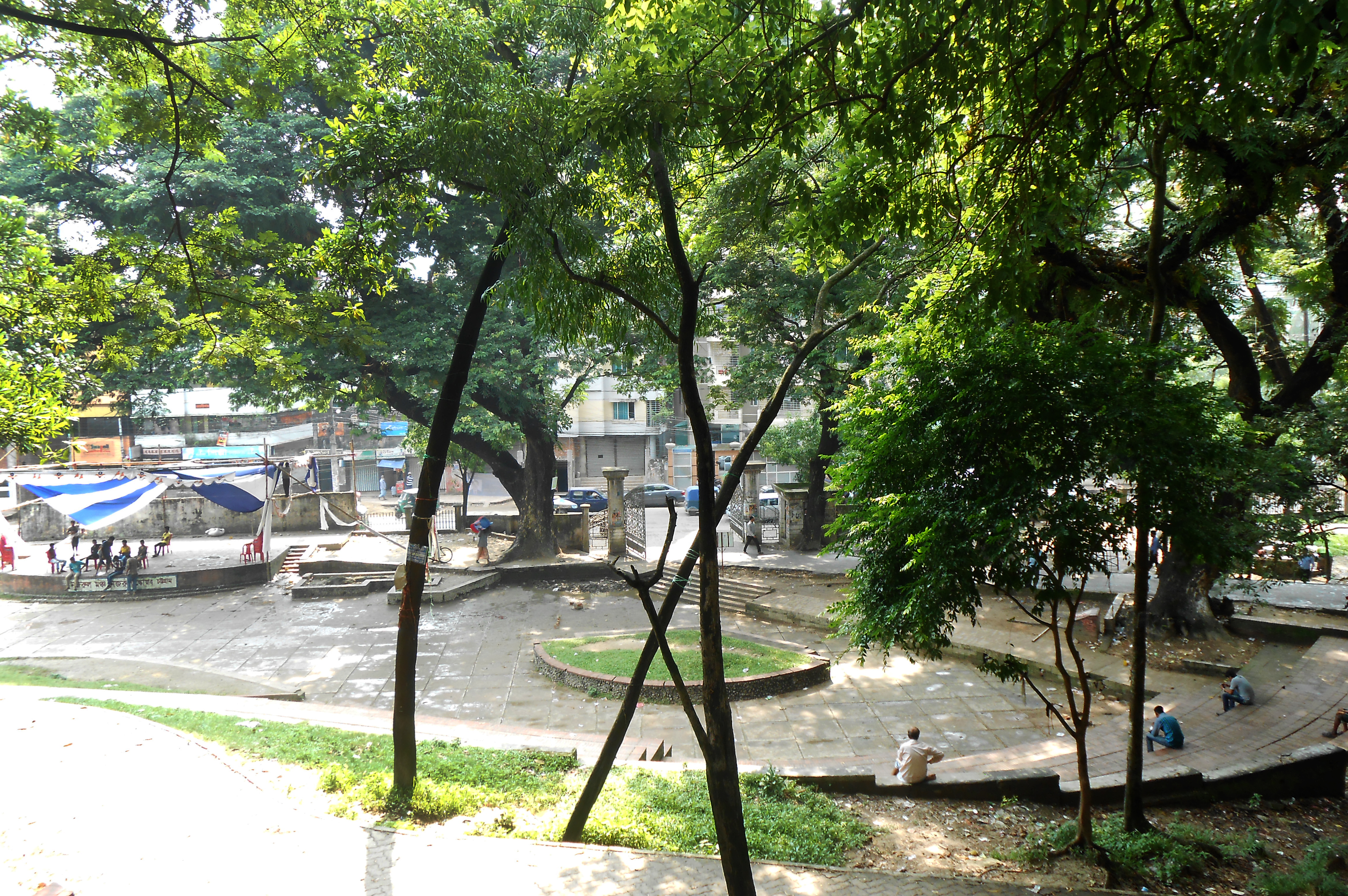
Natural environment

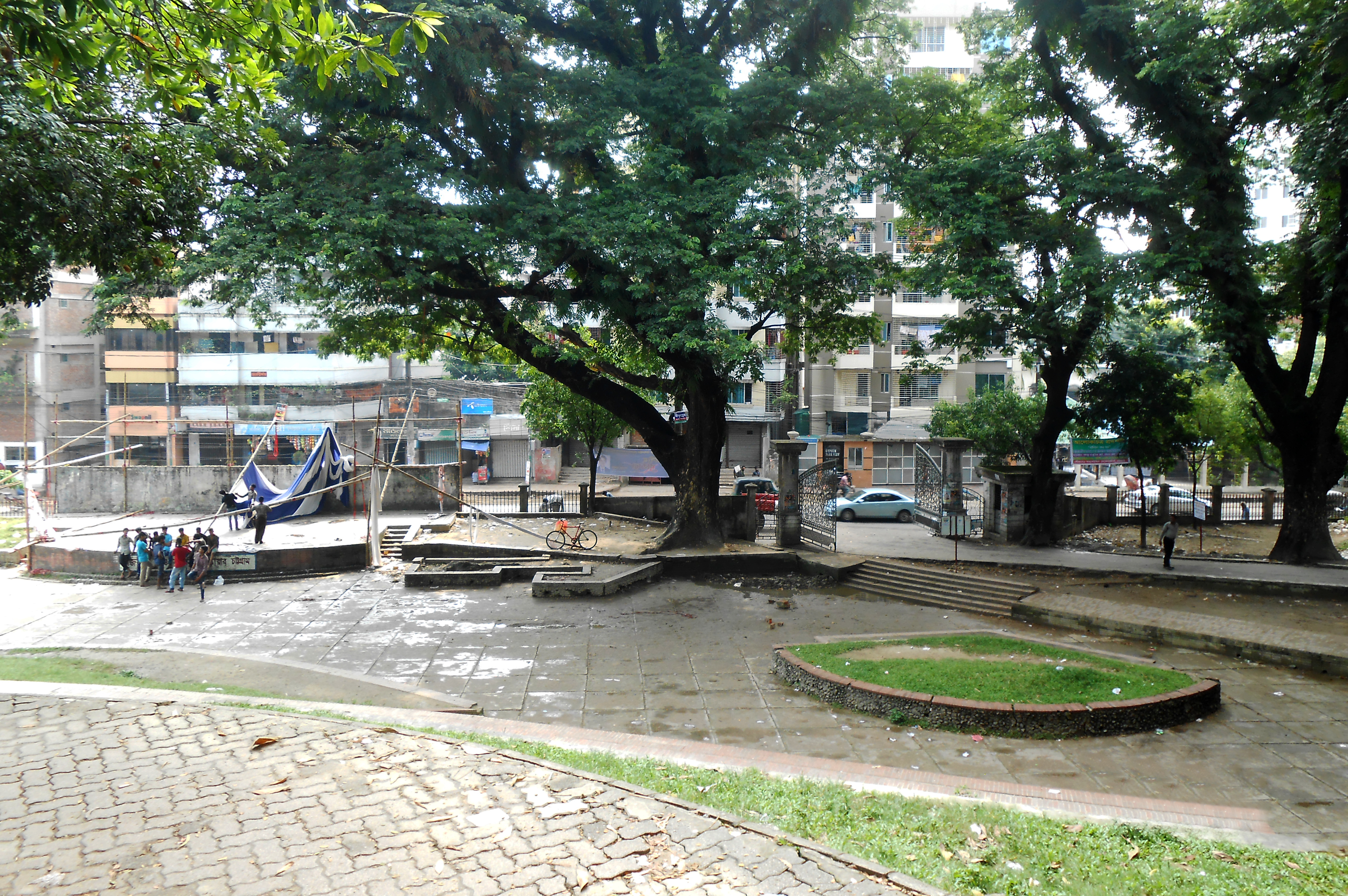
Natural environment

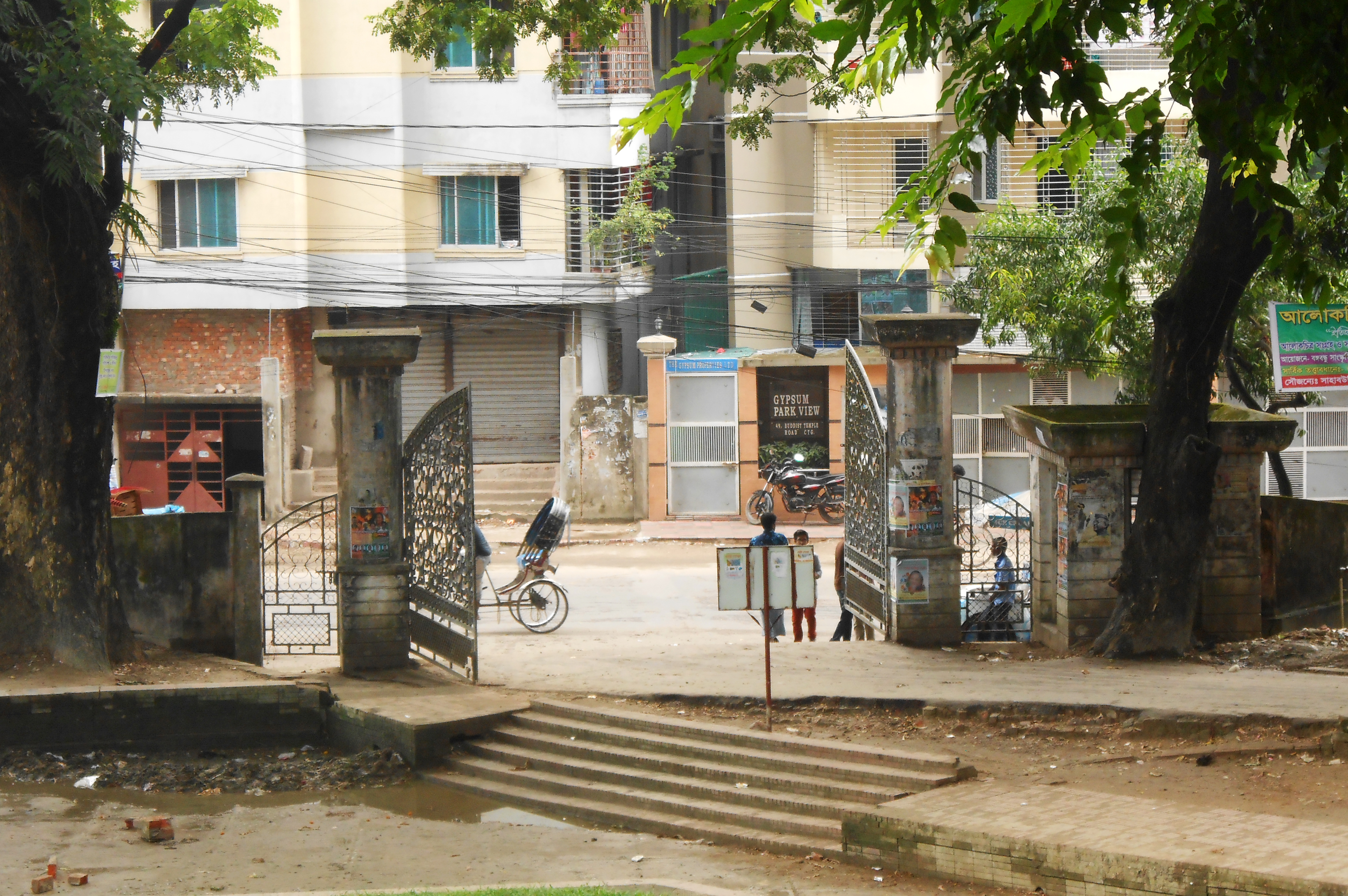
Entrance of the park

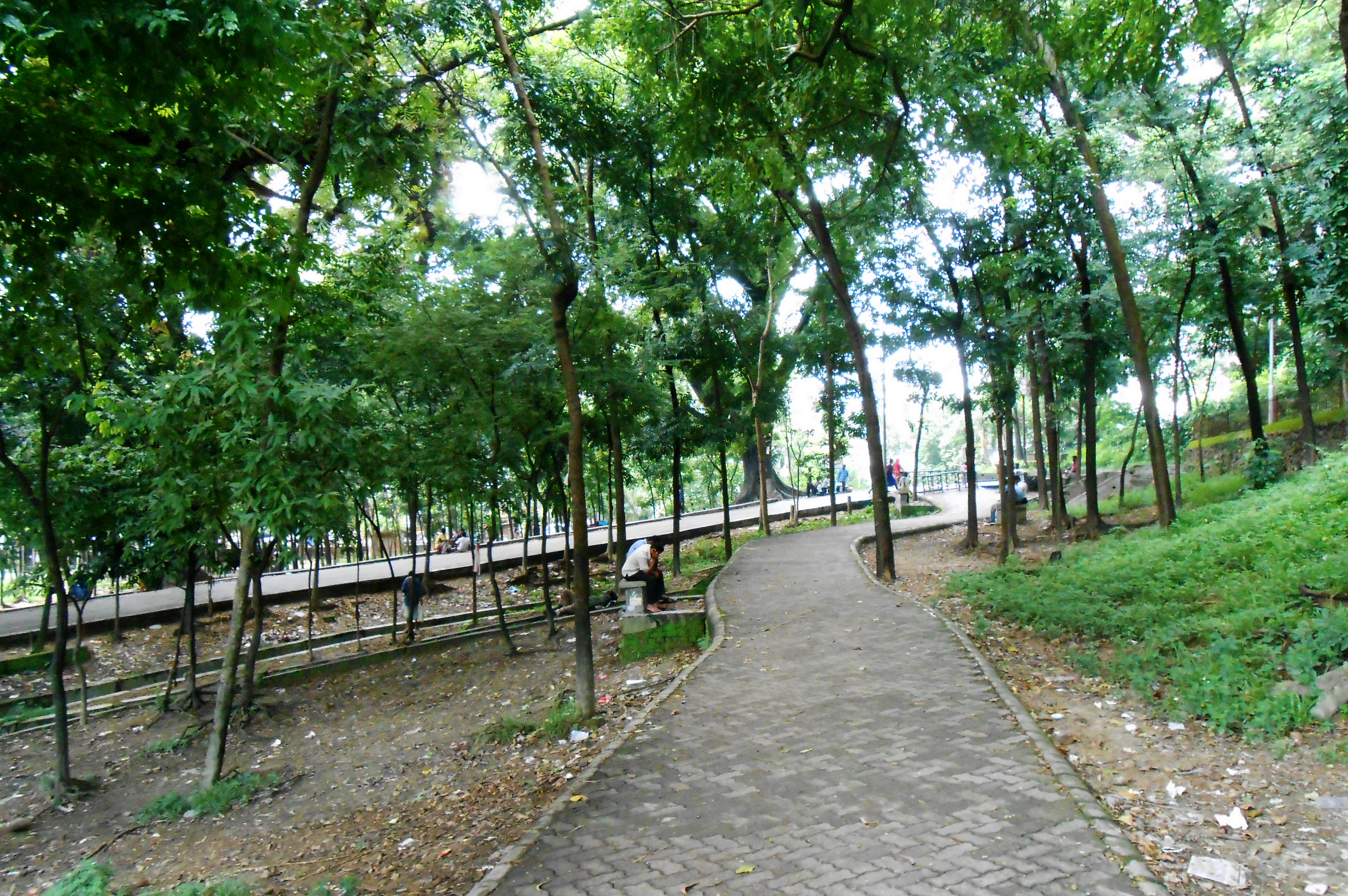
Trees on both sides of the road

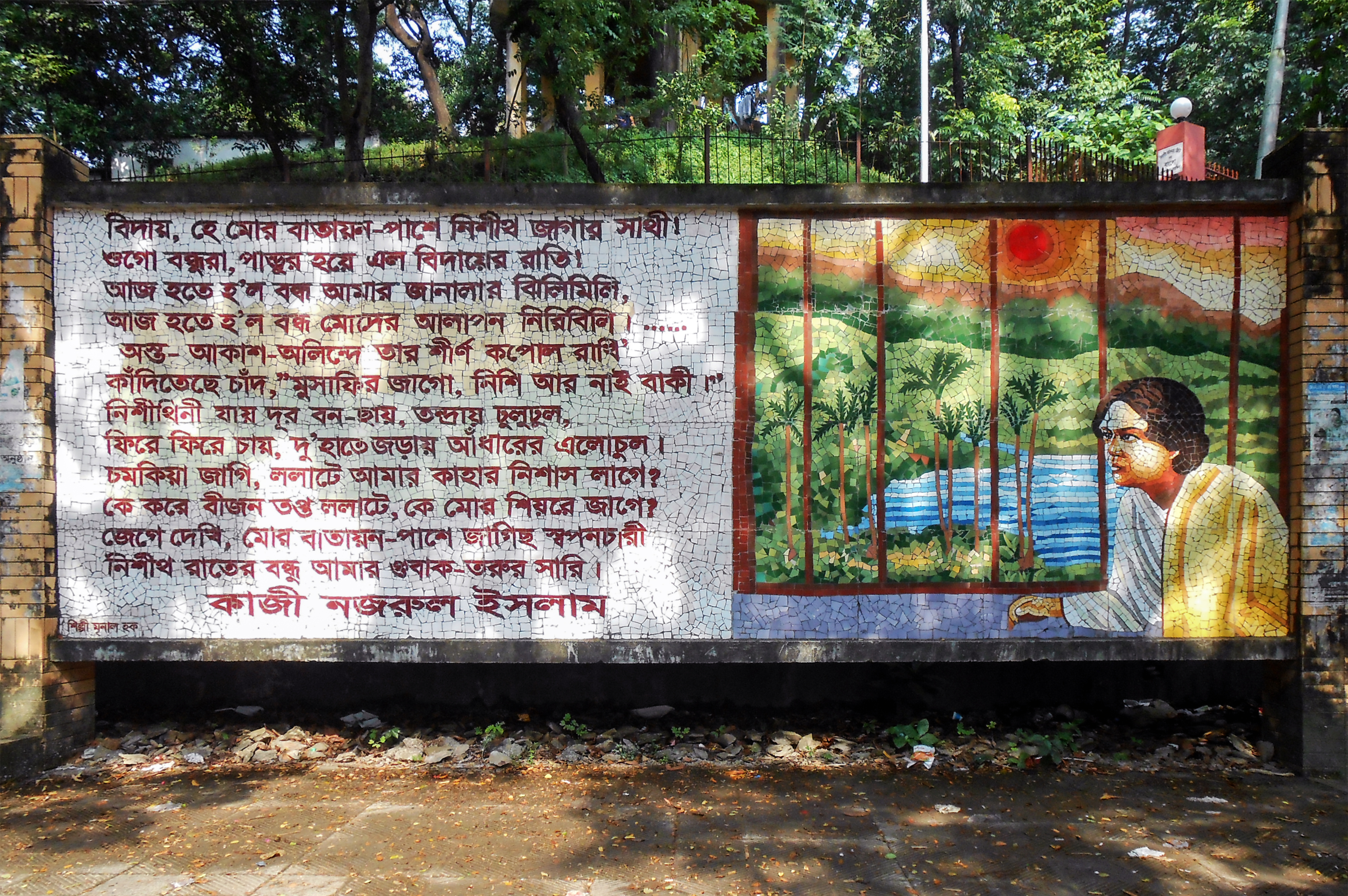
Nazrul Square

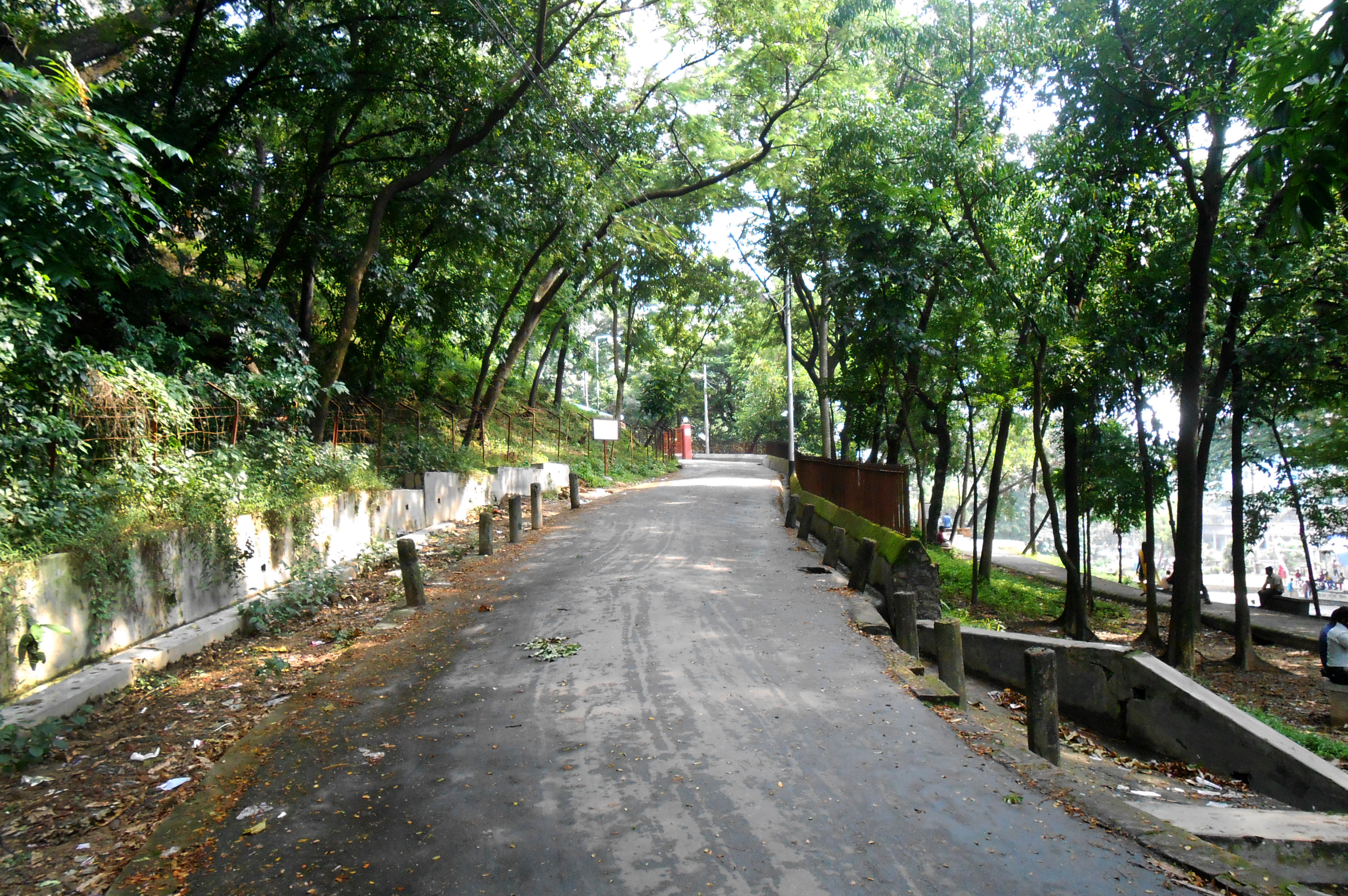
Path to Divisional Commissioner's Bungalow

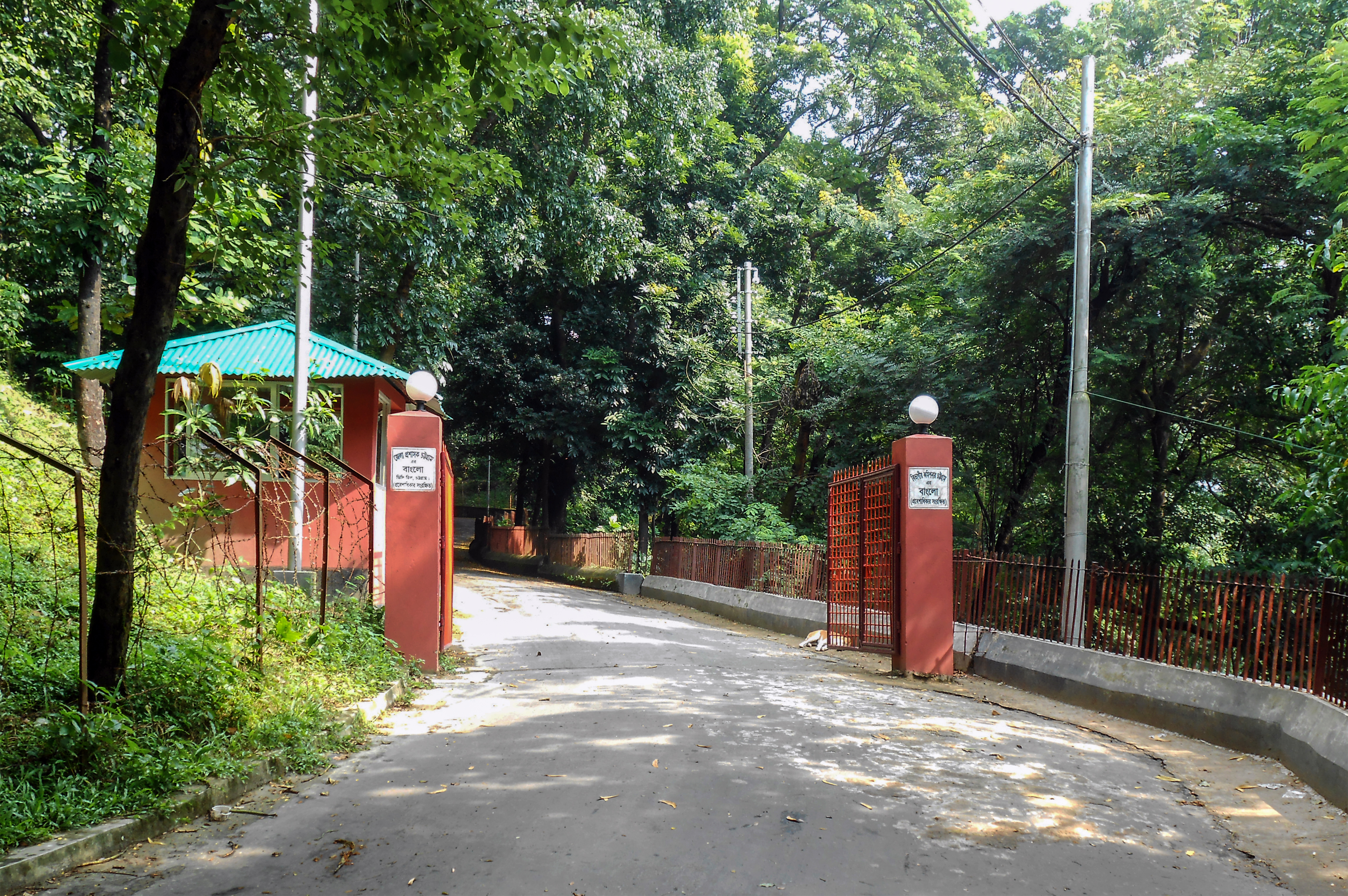
Entrance to Divisional Commissioner's Bungalow
