= Dudpukuria-Dhopachari Wildlife Sanctuary =

Wildlife sanctuary in Bangladesh

- IUCN category IV (habitat/species management area)
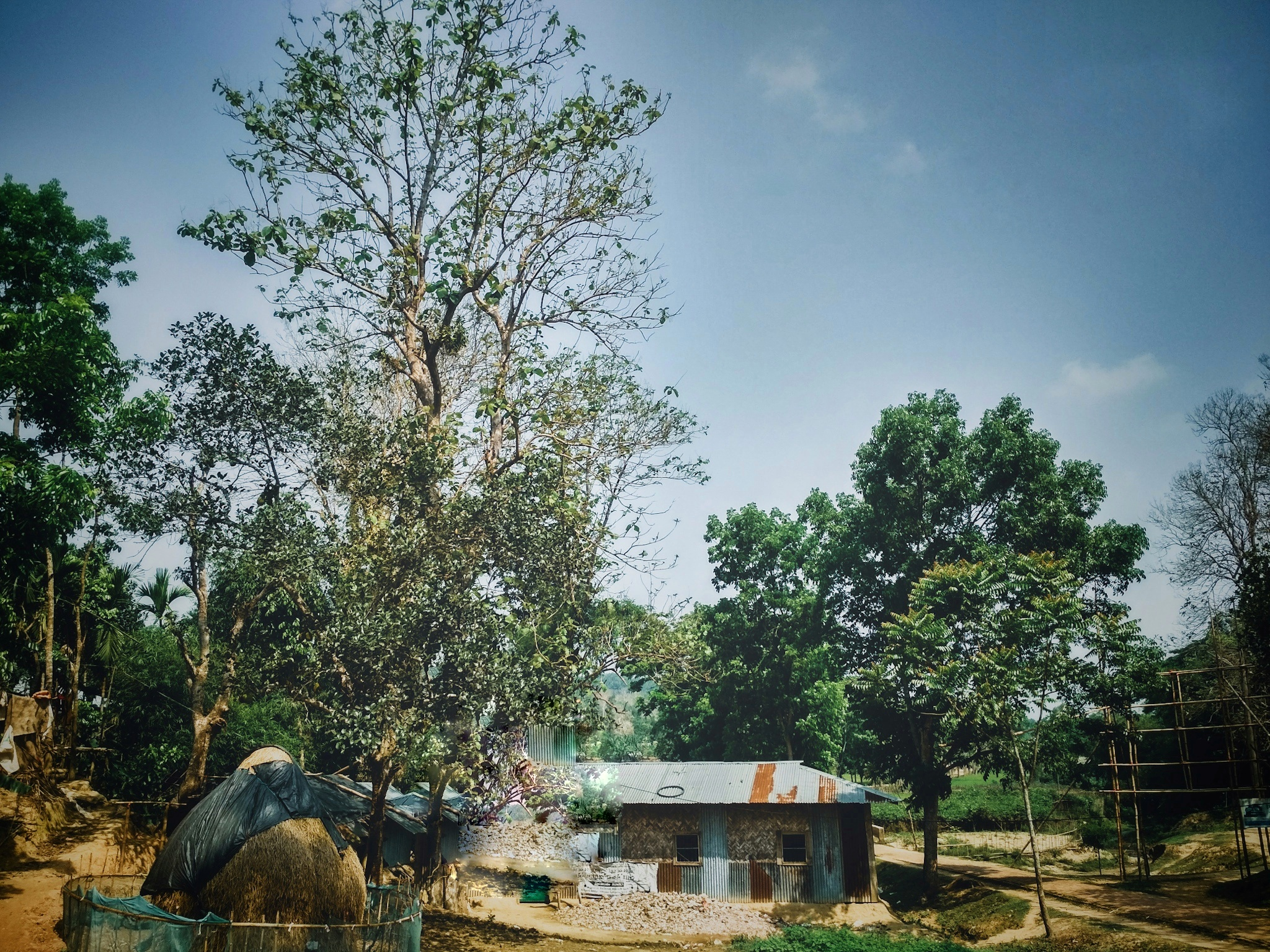

- Location within Bangladesh
- Location: Chittagong District, Chittagong Division, Bangladesh
- Coordinates: 22.471553°N 92.086483°E
- Area: 4,716.57 ha (11,654.9 acres)
- Established: 6 April 2010

Dudpukuria-Dhopachari Wildlife Sanctuary (Bengali: দুধপুকুরিয়া-ধোপাছড়ি বন্যপ্রাণ অভয়ারণ্য) is a wildlife sanctuary located near the Rangunia in Chittagong District of Bangladesh.

The area of the sanctuary is 4,716.57 ha (11,654.9 acres), and is located at the Khurosia and Dhopchari range of Chittagong South Forest. The area was officially declared as a wildlife sanctuary by the government of Bangladesh on 6 April 2010.

== See also ==
- List of wildlife sanctuaries of Bangladesh
