= Biplob Udyan =

Park in Chittagong, Bangladesh

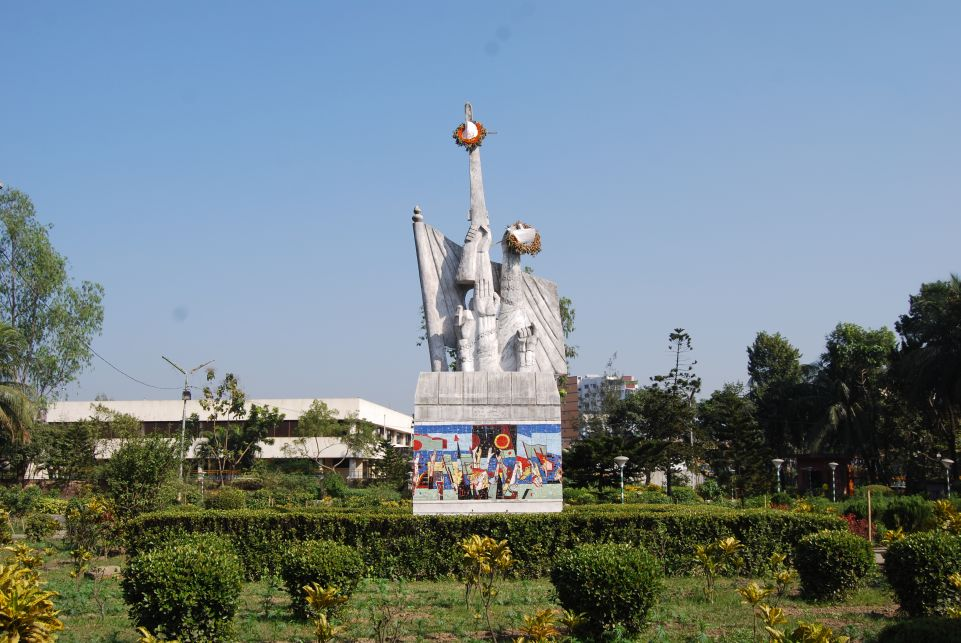
- Liberation Pillar, 2009
- Interactive map of Biplob Udyan
- Location: Sholoshahar Rail Gate 2, CDA Avenue, Chittagong
- Coordinates: 22.3667374°N 91.8243313°E
- Area: 2 acres (0.81 ha)
- Established: 1979
- Owner: Chittagong City Corporation
- Operator: Reform Limited; Style Living Architect Limited
- Parking: no

Biplab Udyan is a park in Chittagong, Bangladesh. It is located near gate number 2 of the city. The park was built in memory of Pritilata Waddedar, a revolutionary woman of the Indian independence movement in Chittagong.

== History ==
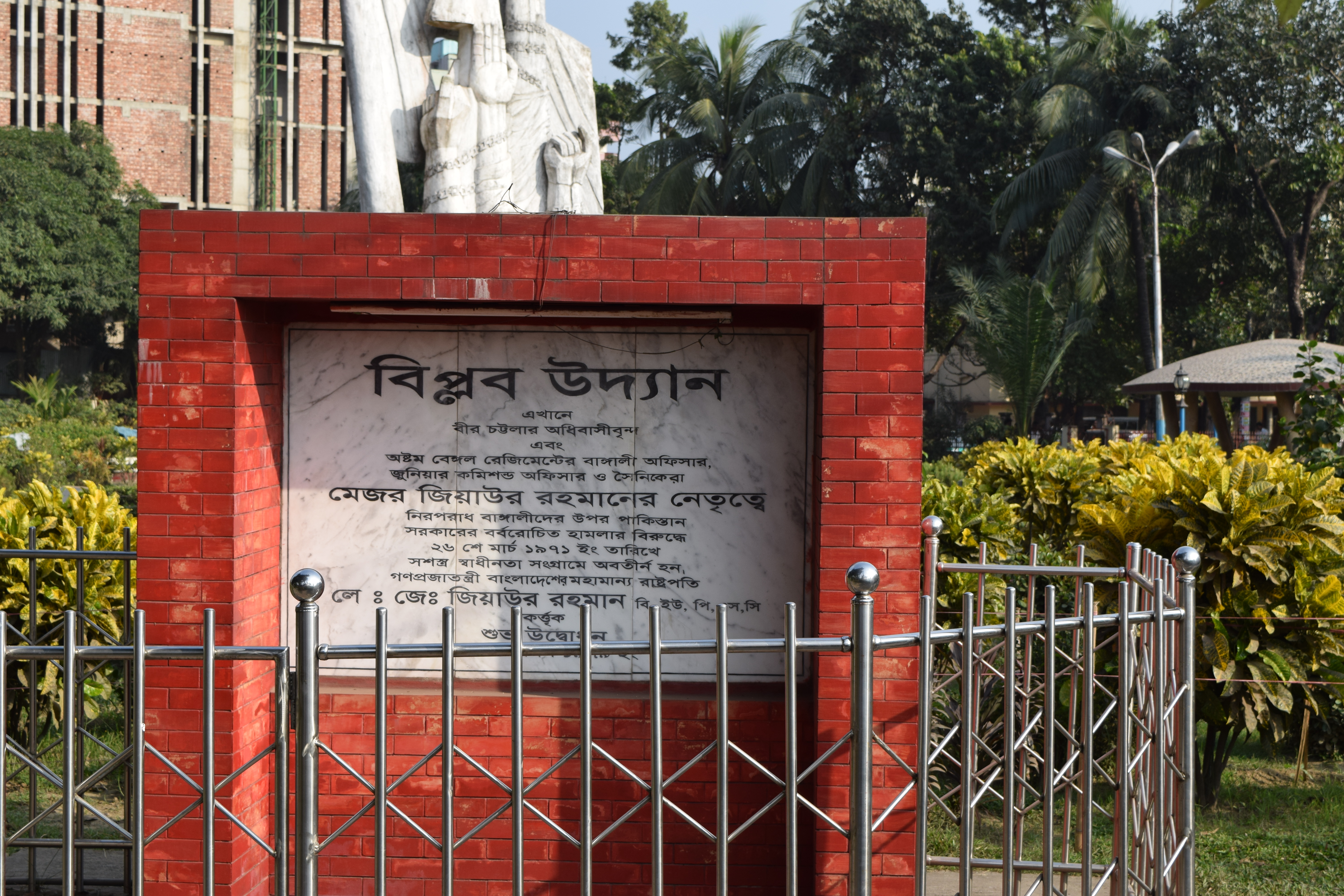
Inaugural plaque

It was the place from where Major Ziaur Rahman first initiated a battle against Pakistan Army during Bangladesh Liberation War in 1971. The park, opened in 1979, was built in honor of Bengali revolutionary nationalist Pritilata Waddedar. In 1 November 2018, Dhaka's Reform Limited and Chittagong's Style living Architects Limited took a 20-year lease on the park from the Chittagong City Corporation. The park was modernized in late 2019 by the Chittagong City Corporation. In 2020, authorities started to build food courts and gaming zone there, resulting criticisms. In 22 August 2023, authorities decided to reconstruct the park to restore its old greenish state. In the same year an agreement was signed with Reform for that purpose. Chittagong's civil society and urban planners protested the construction of 55% of the park's structures in violation of the law and continued construction. In 2024, it was reported that the authority would terminate all park-related agreements, refrain from building new shops, restore its natural setting, and protect the inauguration plaque connected to president Rahman. The authority also demolished newly-built structures on the park's land, which now looks like a plain field.

== Description ==
The 2 acres (0.81 ha) park and surrounding sidewalks include approx. 1 acre (0.40 ha) The land was allocated to these two institutions.

The Udyan contains many species of flowering plants. The Arch is made of trees, and the gate is inscribed with trees 'revolution garden'. There are also concrete awnings. There is a separate area for children. There is free admission. The park is open to visitors after four o'clock in the afternoon. There is a sculpture called Swadhinata Stambha (Independence Pillar). The history of Bangladesh Victory Day in 1971 from language movement of 1952 to 1971 has been highlighted in the park.

== Restaurant street ==
There is restaurant street formed of multiple street food shops.

== Gallery ==
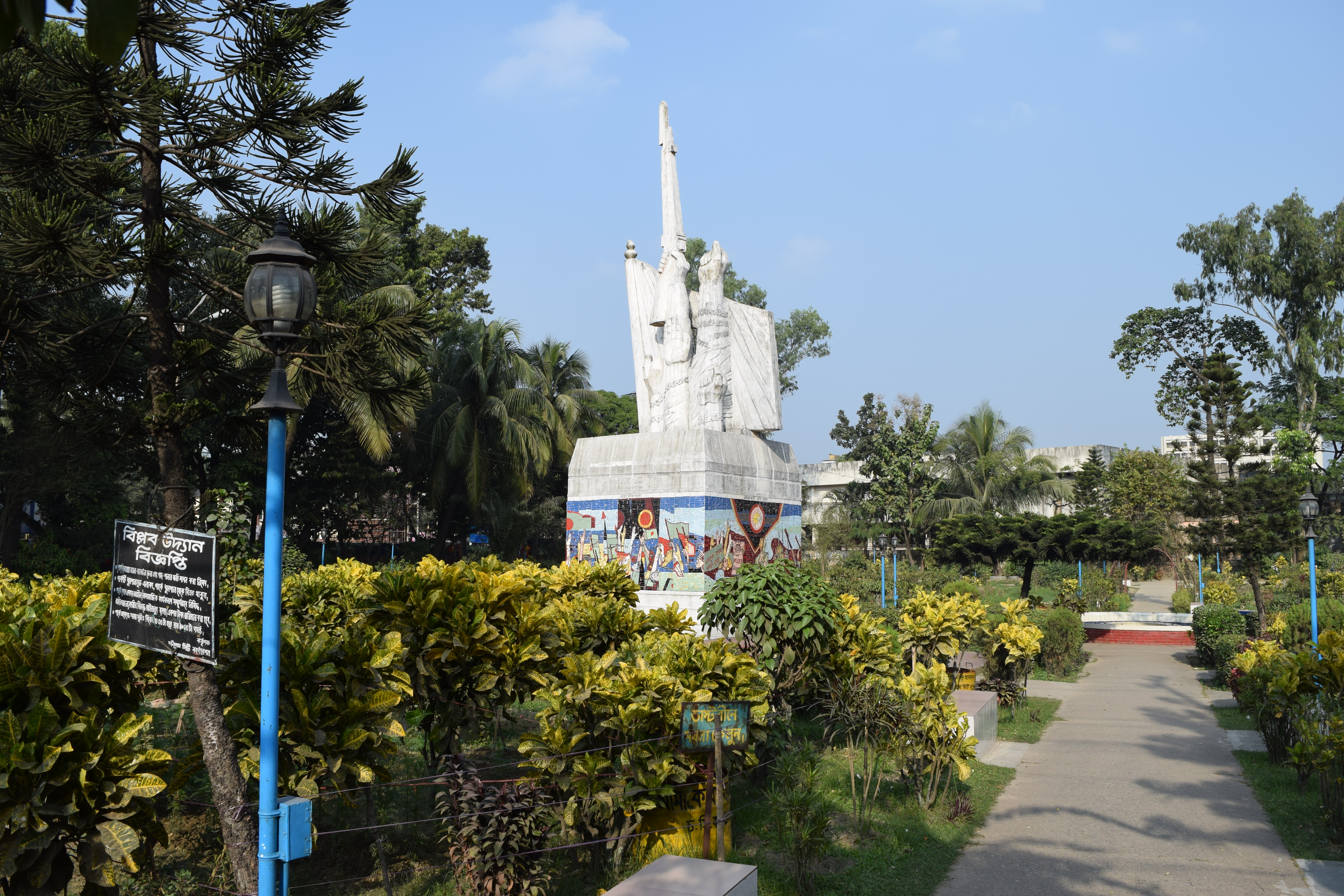
At daylight

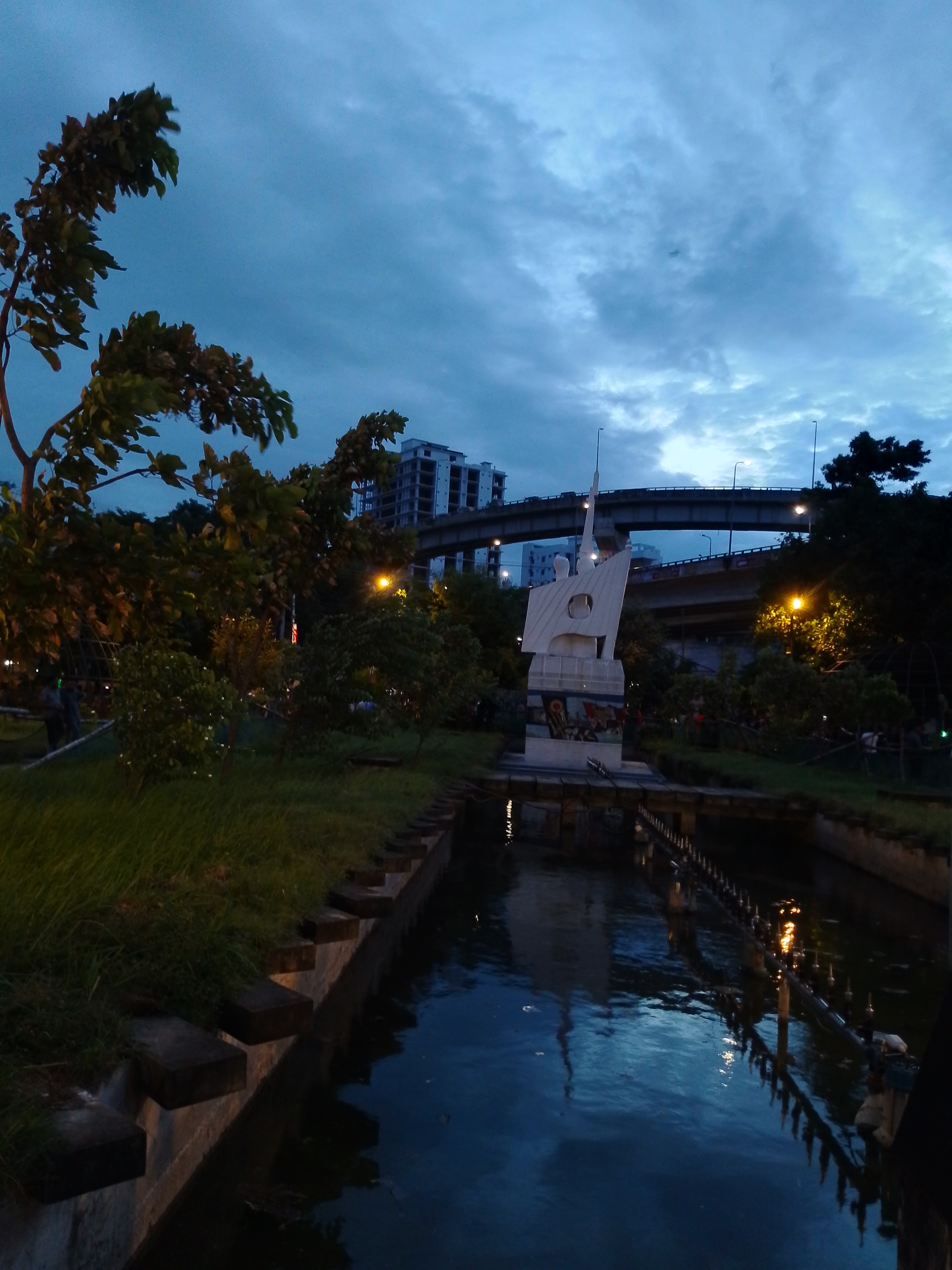
At night

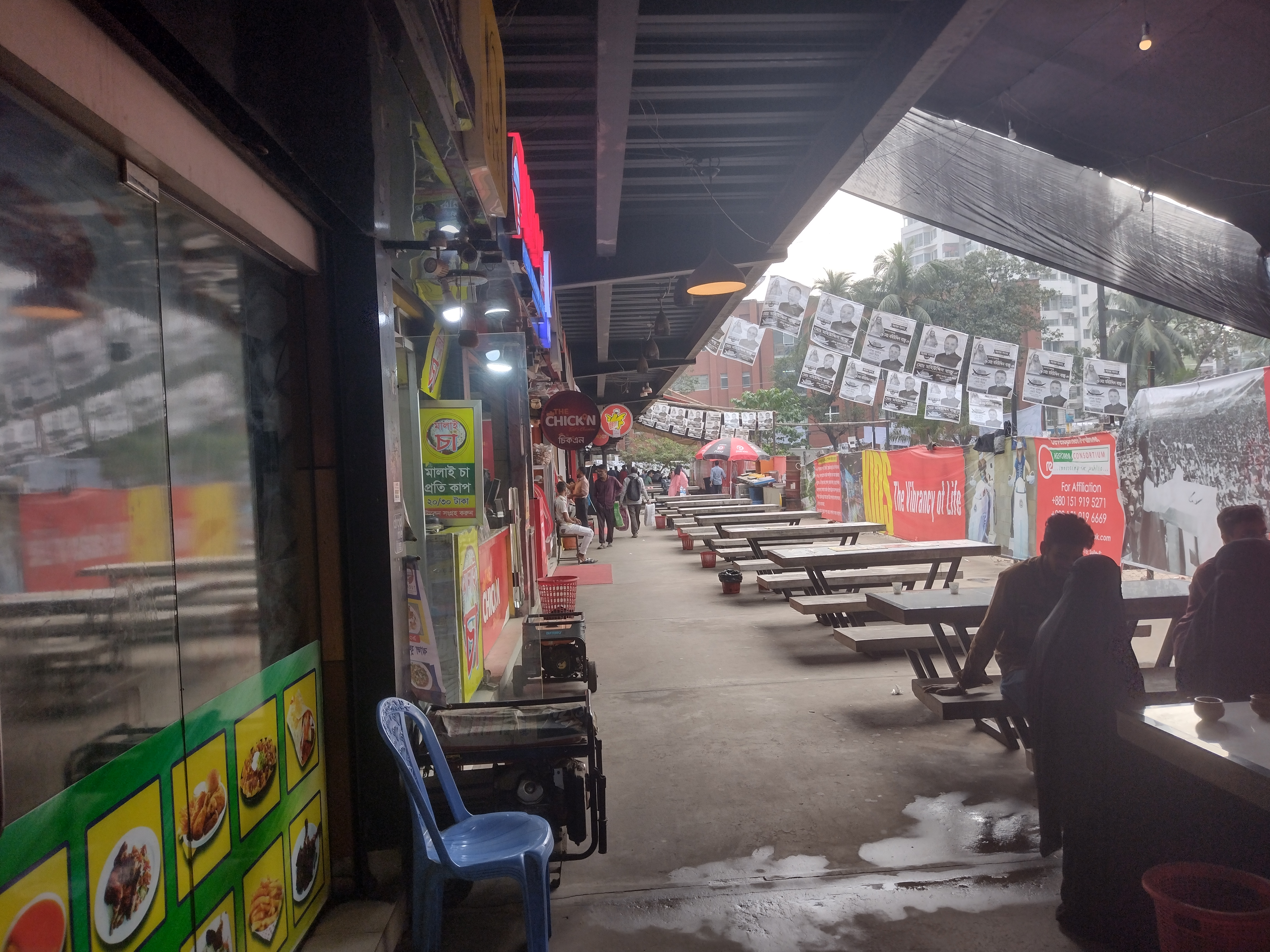
Shops next to the Udyan
