= Ghilachhari Union, Naniarchar =

Union of Rangamati District, Chittagong, Bangladesh

Ghilachhari ঘিলাছড়ি
- Union
- Interactive map of Ghilachhari
- Country: Bangladesh
- Division: Chittagong Division
- District: Rangamati District
- Upazila: Naniarchar Upazila

Area
  - Total: 82.88 km^{2} (32.00 sq mi)

Population (2022)
  - Total: 9,367
  - Density: 113.0/km^{2} (292.7/sq mi)
- Time zone: UTC+6 (BST)
- Postal code: 4520
- Website: ghilachhariup.rangamati.gov.bd

Ghilachhari Union is a union of Naniarchar Upazila under Rangamati District.

== Demography ==
According to 2022 census, total population of the Union are 9,367. Among them, 188 are Muslim, 9,147 are Buddhist, 20 are Hindu and 12 are Christian.

Religion-2022
1. Buddhism (97.7%)
2. Islam (2.01%)
3. Hinduism (0.21%)
4. Christianity (0.13%)
5. Others (0.00%)

== Ethnicity ==
This Union is home to a variety of different ethnic groups. Among them, 551 are Bengali, 8,783 are Chakma and 33 are of others ethnic groups.

Ethnicity-2022
1. Chakma (93.8%)
2. Bengali (5.88%)
3. Others (0.35%)
