= Baishari Bangdepa Wildlife Sanctuary =

Bangladeshi wildlife sanctuary

- বাইশারী ব্যাংডেপা বন্যপ্রাণী অভয়ারণ্য
- Location within Bangladesh
- Location: Ramu Upazila, Cox's Bazar District, Chattogram Division, Bangladesh
- Nearest city: Ramu
- Coordinates: 21°28′38.35″N 92°05′31.26″E
- Area: 2,233.055 ha (5,518.00 acres)
- Established: 16 April 2023
- Governing body: Bangladesh Forest Department

Baishari Bangdepa Wildlife Sanctuary is a significant wildlife sanctuary located in Cox's Bazar District in the southeast of Bangladesh. Established on 16 April 2023, this sanctuary covers an area of 2,233.055 hectares. It is home to many rare and important species, including elephants, bears, leopards, sambar deer, and spotted deer. It is considered a major initiative for conserving wildlife and the environment in Bangladesh.

== Location and history ==
Baishari Bangdepa Wildlife Sanctuary is located in Ramu Upazila of Cox's Bazar District. It covers a total area of 2,233.055 hectares, making it one of the largest sanctuaries in Bangladesh. The sanctuary was established on 16 April 2023, according to Section 13(1) of the "Bangladesh Wildlife (Conservation and Security) Act, 2011." It is one of 25 government wildlife sanctuaries in Bangladesh. Baishari Bangdepa Wildlife Sanctuary is important not only for wildlife conservation, but also for protecting the environment, addressing climate change, and supporting the livelihoods and education of local people.

- To the north: the water boundary of Tulatoli Beach, government forest land of Eidgaon Mouza
- To the south: Ramu Rubber Plantation, Baghkhali Beat, the water boundary of Ginatali Beach, and government forest land of Garjania Mouza
- To the east: the paved road from Chattogram to Ute Arakan
- To the west: the water boundary of Meherghona Range, Makhuyakhali Mouza, and the flowing area except for government forest land in Joarianala Range Mouza

The sanctuary is surrounded by various forests, rivers, hills, and roads. Its northern, southern, eastern, and western borders are all marked by forests, water boundaries, and other important areas.

== Environment and forest types ==
This sanctuary contains several types of forests, most notably:

- Deciduous forest
- Dry deciduous forest
- Moist peninsular sal forest

These forest types play an important role in protecting Bangladesh's biodiversity.

== Wildlife ==
Many different animals can be found in Baishari Bangdepa Wildlife Sanctuary. Notably:

- Bear
- Elephant
- Leopard
- Sambar deer
- Spotted deer

Many other mammals, birds, and reptiles also live in this sanctuary.
