= Naniarchar Union =

Union of Rangamati District, Chittagong, Bangladesh

Naniarchar নানিয়ারচর
- Union
- Interactive map of Naniarchar
- Country: Bangladesh
- Division: Chittagong Division
- District: Rangamati District
- Upazila: Naniarchar Upazila

Area
  - Total: 106.19 km^{2} (41.00 sq mi)

Population (2022)
  - Total: 13,030
  - Density: 122.7/km^{2} (317.8/sq mi)
- Time zone: UTC+6 (BST)
- Postal code: 4520
- Website: naniarcharup.rangamati.gov.bd

Naniarchar Union is a union of Naniarchar Upazila under Rangamati District.

== Demography ==
According to 2022 census, total population of the Union are 13,030. Among them, 1,061 are Muslim, 11,816 are Buddhist, 130 are Hindu, 14 are Christian and 9 follow others religion.

Religion-2022
1. Buddhism (90.7%)
2. Islam (8.14%)
3. Hinduism (1.00%)
4. Christianity (0.11%)
5. Others (0.07%)

== Ethnicity ==
This Union is home to a variety of different ethnic groups. Among them, 1,341 are Bengali, 11,619 are Chakma and 70 are of others ethnic groups.

Ethnicity-2022
1. Chakma (89.2%)
2. Bengali (10.3%)
3. Others (0.54%)
