= Shaheb Bibi Mosque =

Mosque in Raozan, Chattogram, Bangladesh

- সাহেব বিবি মসজিদ
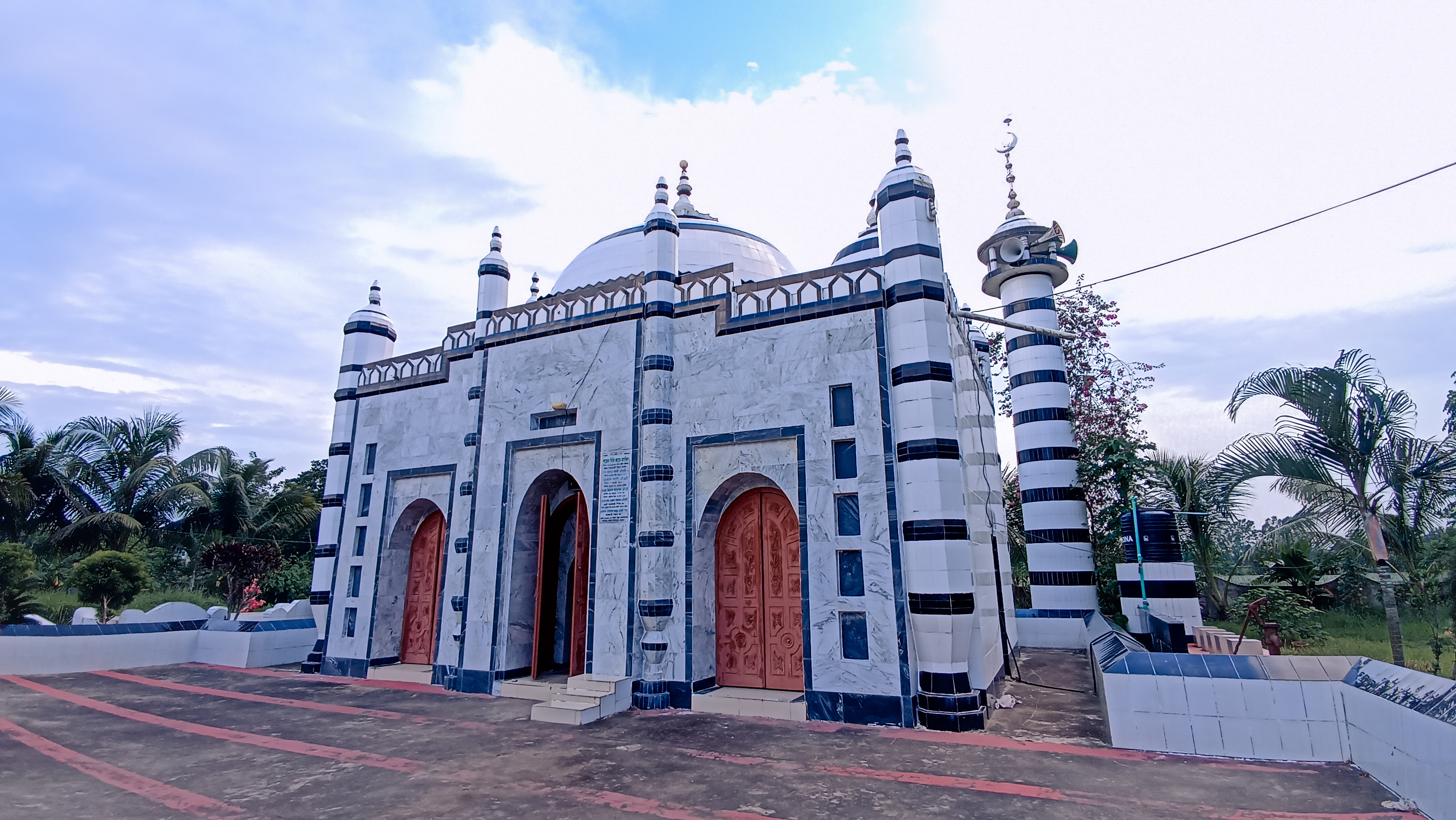

Religion
- Affiliation: Islam
- Ecclesiastical or organizational status: Mosque
- Status: Active

Location
- Location: Raozan, Chattogram, Chattogram Division
- Country: Bangladesh

Architecture
- Type: Mosque architecture
- Style: Mughal
- Completed: 1612

The Shaheb Bibi Mosque (Bengali: সাহেব বিবি মসজিদ) is a historic mosque located in Raozan, Chattogram, Bangladesh.

== History ==
The mosque was built under the patronage of Shabeb Bibi, wife of Zamindar Amir Mohammad Chowdhury of Raozan.

== Architecture ==
The mosque is constructed using lime with terracotta decorations. It stands on eight pillars and features a single dome. The structure has three doors and two windows, with two arched gateways at the front and sides.

== See also ==
- Islam in Bangladesh
- List of mosques in Bangladesh
- List of archaeological sites in Bangladesh
