= Naniarchar Upazila =

Naniarchar নানিয়াচর
- Upazila
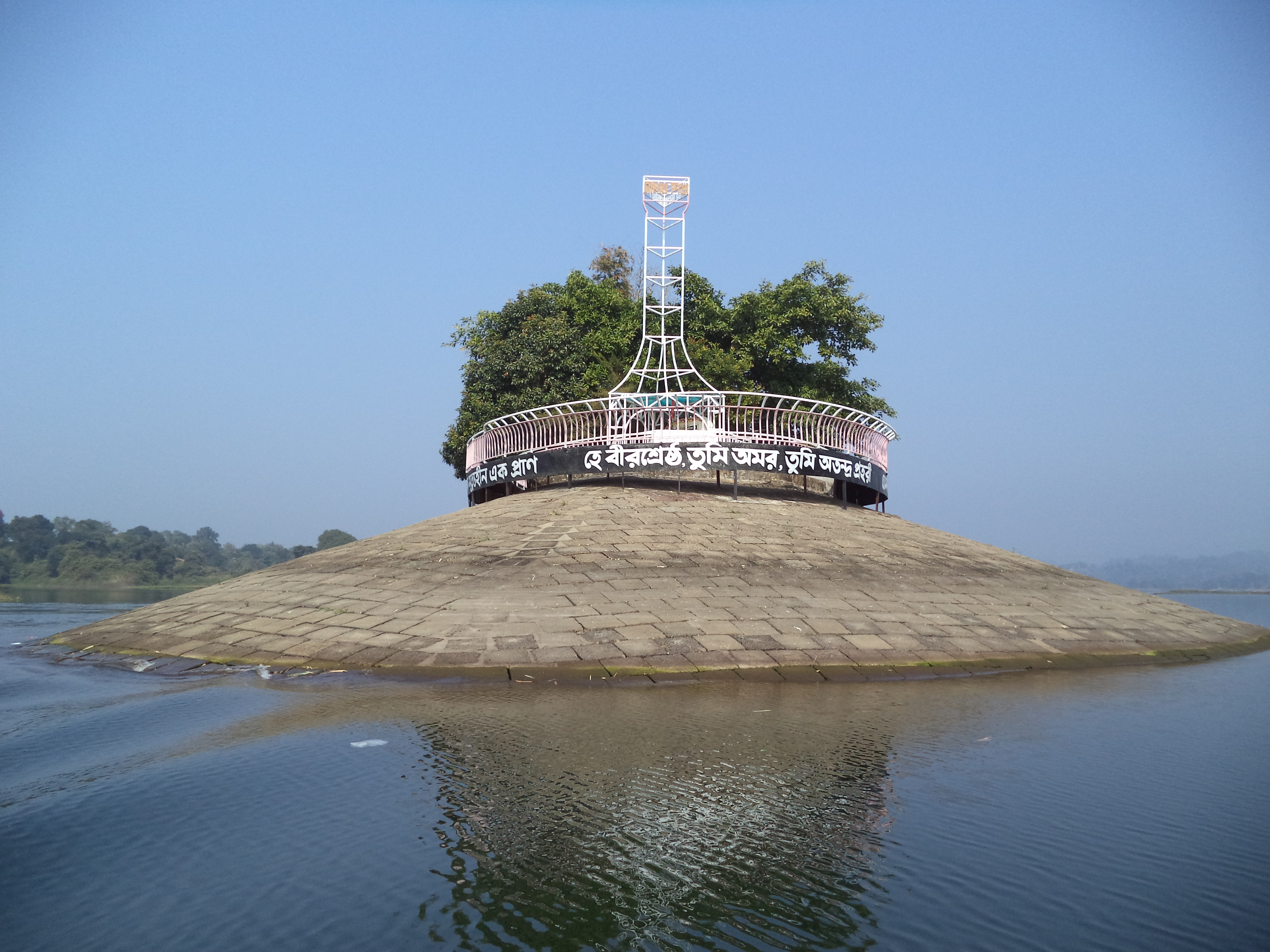
- Shahid Lance Naik Munshi Abdur Rauf Bir Shreshtho Mausoleum at Burighat, Naniarchar upazila, Rangamati district

- Coordinates: 22°51.5′N 92°7′E
- Country: Bangladesh
- Division: Chittagong
- District: Rangamati

Area
  - Total: 393.67 km^{2} (152.00 sq mi)

Population (2022)
  - Total: 48,523
  - Density: 123.26/km^{2} (319.24/sq mi)
- Time zone: UTC+6 (BST)
- Postal code: 4520

Naniarchar Upazila mauza geocode map

Naniarchar (Bengali: নানিয়াচর) is an upazila of Rangamati District in the Division of Chittagong, Bangladesh.

== Geography ==
Naniarchar is located at 22.8583°N 92.1167°E. It has a total area of 393.67 km^{2} (152.00 sq mi).

== Demographics ==
According to the 2022 Bangladeshi census, Naniarchar Upazila had 11,621 households and a population of 48,523. 8.81% of the population were under 5 years of age. Naniarchar had a literacy rate (age 7 and over) of 69.18%: 75.83% for males and 62.34% for females, and a sex ratio of 102.97 males for every 100 females. 13,379 (27.57%) lived in urban areas.

=== Ethnicity and religion ===
Religions in Naniarchar Upazila (2022)
Religion	Percent
Buddhism	83.18%
Islam	14.84%
Hinduism	1.87%
Other or not stated	0.11%

Population by religion in Union
Union	Muslim	Buddhist	Others
Burighat	5,928	7,842	60
Ghilachhari	188	9,147	32
Naniarchar	1,061	11,816	853
Sabekkyong	24	11,555	15

🟨 Buddhist majority

As of the 2022 Bangladeshi census, Naniarchar upazila had a population of 48,523. The ethnic population was 39,659 (81.73%), of which Chakma were 38,766 and Marma 842.

Ethnicity in the Naniarchar Upazila (2022)
1. Chakma (79.9%)
2. Bengali (18.3%)
3. Marma (1.74%)
4. Others (0.10%)

Population by ethnicity in Union
Union	Bengali	Chakma	Marma	Others
Burighat	6,154	6,893	759	24
Ghilachhari	551	8,783	28	5
Naniarchar	1,341	11,619	50	20
Sabekkyong	116	11,471	5	2

🟨 Chakma majority

== Administration ==
UNO: Mohammad Amimul Ahsan Khan.

Naniarchar Upazila is divided into four union parishads: Burighat, Ghilachhari, Naniarchar, and Sabekkyong. The union parishads are subdivided into 20 mauzas and 158 villages.

== Notable people ==
- Rupna Chakma, footballer
- Manabendra Narayan Larma, politician and indigenous rights activist

== See also ==
- Districts of Bangladesh
- Divisions of Bangladesh
- Rangamati Hill District
- Upazilas of Bangladesh
