= List of waterfalls in Bangladesh =

This article is a list of waterfalls in Bangladesh.

== Chittagong Division ==
- Chingri Waterfall is located in Ruma Upazila of Bandarban District, Bangladesh.
- Nafakhum Waterfall, a natural waterfall situated in Bandarban District of Chittagong Division. In Marma language, Khumi means waterfall. It is one of the largest waterfalls in Bangladesh.
- Risang Waterfall (also known as Sapmara Risang Jhorna) is a hill waterfall located at Sapmara village in Matiranga Upazila, Khagrachhari District. It is about 10 km away from Khagrachhari town. The height of the waterfall is about 100 feet.
- Khoiyachora Waterfall is located on the hills of Ward No. 4 of Purba Khoiyachora, Khoiyachora Union, Mirsharai Upazila, Chittagong District.
- Napittachora trail is a waterfall located on the hills of Ward No. 6, Purba Noiduar Nich Taluk, Khoiyachora Union, Mirsharai Upazila, Chittagong, Bangladesh.
- Jadipai Waterfall is situated in Ruma Upazila of Bandarban District, Bangladesh. It is one of the widest waterfalls in the country, which makes it a major attraction. During the monsoon, water flow increases, attracting visitors from across the country.
- Shuvolong Waterfall is located in Barkal Upazila, Rangamati District, Bangladesh.
- Dhuppani Waterfall is a waterfall in Belaichhari Upazila, Rangamati District, located at a place called Orchhari in Farua Union. Locals also call it Duppani Jhorna. In the local language, Dhup means white, hence the name "white water waterfall".
- Shahasradhara Waterfall is located in Sitakunda Upazila, Chittagong District.
- Amiakhum Waterfall is located in a remote area called Nakshiyang of Thanchi Upazila, Bandarban, near the Bangladesh–Myanmar border. It is often called the heaven of Bengal.
- Tlaboang Waterfall (Double Falls)
- Damtua Waterfall (Lamunai Waterfall)
- Baklai Waterfall
- Muppochora Waterfall
- Komlok Waterfall
- Hazachora Waterfall (Shuknachora Waterfall)
- Tinap Saitar
- Lung Fer Va Saityar
- Sikam Taisa Waterfall
- Toiduchara Waterfall
- Jhorjhori Waterfall
- Suptadhara Waterfall
- Rijuk Waterfall
- Raikhong Waterfall
- Zingsiam Saitar Waterfall
- Boroitoli Waterfall
- Tuinum Waterfall
- Rupmuhuri Waterfall
- Poamuhuri Waterfall
- Faipi Waterfall
- Patang Waterfall
- Tareng Waterfall
- Tuari Mairang
- Nakabachora Waterfall
- Komoldoh Waterfall
- Himchori Waterfall
- Gaskata Waterfall
- Likhiyang Waterfall
- Tui Ku Tumu Waterfall
- Palong Khiang Waterfall (Tangkhoyain Waterfall)
- Shilbandha Waterfall (Chhalawa Waterfall)
- Toilafang Waterfall
- Wang Pa Waterfall
- Ghagra Teima Waterfall (Kalabagan Waterfall)
- Langlok Waterfall (Liluk Waterfall)
- Chagolkanda Waterfall
- Barnal Waterfall
- Terang Teikalai
- Tejengma Waterfall
- Sijuk Waterfall
- Shoilo Propat
- Twisama Waterfall
- Horin Mara Waterfall
- Udutoy Waterfall, Majher Para, Sualok, Bandarban Sadar Upazila
- Shaingong Waterfall
- Saingpra Waterfall
- Ladmerakh Waterfall
- Sonaichora Waterfall
- Barabkunda Agni Waterfall
- Barabkunda Tri-fall Waterfall
- Ruposhi Waterfall is a waterfall located on the hills of Ward No. 5, Purba Polmoghora, Khoiyachora Union, Mirsharai Upazila, Chittagong District.
- Langlok Waterfall or Liluk Waterfall is situated near Tindu, Bandarban, which was recently discovered.
- Baklai Waterfall
- Devi Ruma Waterfall, Naikhyongchhari, Hamdiapara, Rashidnagar, Bandarban

== Sylhet Division ==
- Parikunda Waterfall is located in Barlekha Upazila of Moulvibazar District, Bangladesh.
- Madhabkunda Waterfall is situated in Barlekha Upazila of Moulvibazar District, Bangladesh.
- Hum Hum or Hum Hum Waterfall (also called Cheetah Jhorna) is located inside the Kurma Beat of Rajkandi Reserve Forest in Kamalganj Upazila, Moulvibazar District, Bangladesh.
- Sangrampunji Waterfall
- Kulumchhara Waterfall
- Aduri Waterfall
- Mora Waterfall
