= Damtua Waterfall =

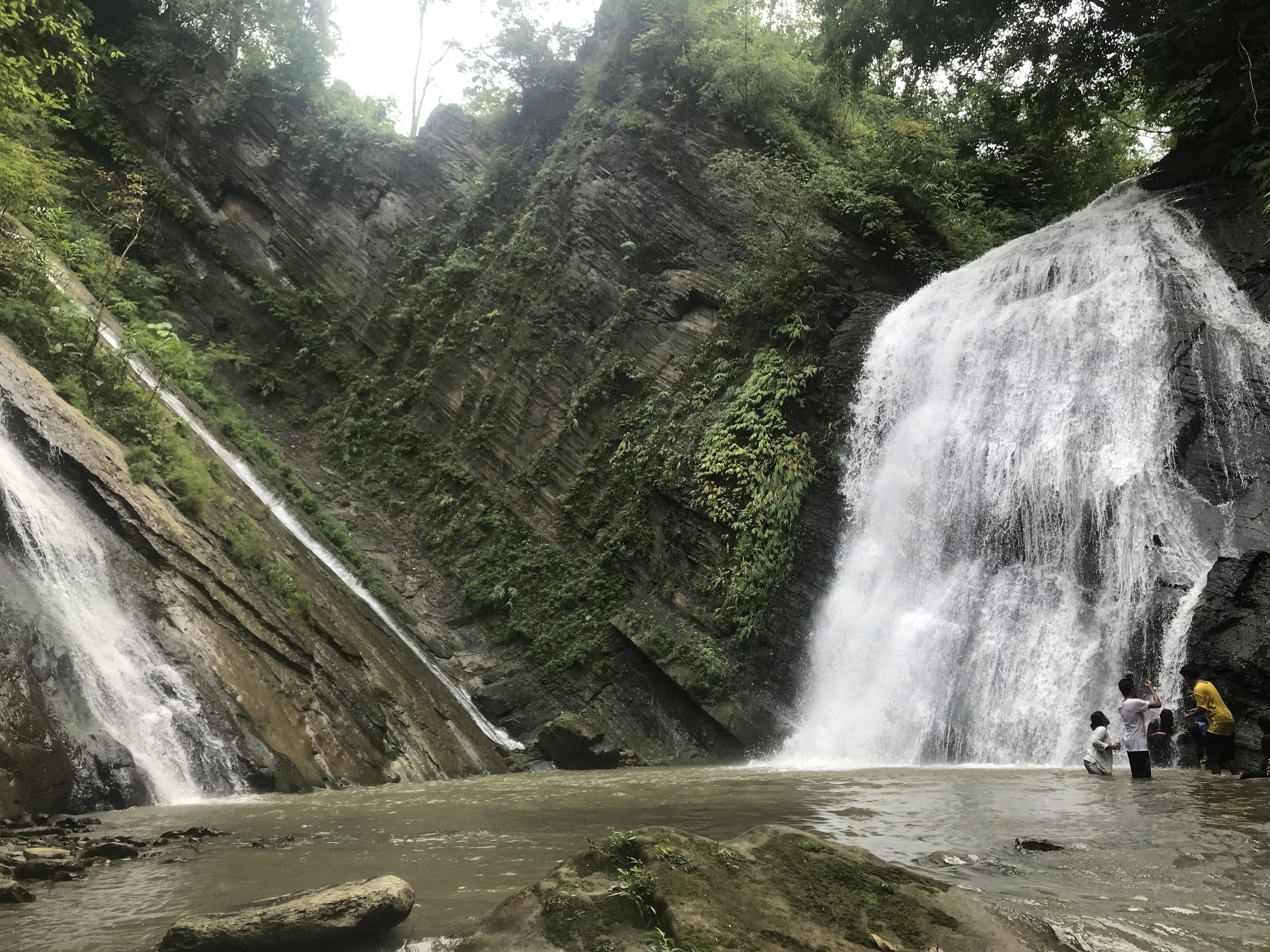
- Interactive map of Damtua Waterfall
- Location: Alikadam, Bandarban District
- Coordinates: 21°45′37″N 92°23′44″E

Damtua Waterfall is located in Alikadam Upazila of Bandarban District, Bangladesh. The waterfall is known by multiple names.

== Description ==
The falls of Damtua Waterfall and tourists at the site

The waterfall is situated in a Mro-inhabited area. In the Mro language, the stream where the waterfall is located is called Tuk O. Here, Tuk means frog and O means stream, thus Tuk O means Frog Stream. The name Damtua refers to a steep wall where frogs or fish cannot climb up. Waznaparag means water falling from a hill or high place. Hence, the waterfall is also known as Tuk O Damtua Waznaparag.

Since water falls from two sides into an open space, under moonlight the place creates a special charm. For this reason, in the local Mro language the waterfall is also called Lamonyi Waterfall. Here, Lamo means moon and Nyi means light — thus Lamonyi means Moonlight.

== See also ==
- List of waterfalls in Bangladesh
