= Jadipai Waterfall =

Waterfall in Bangladesh

Jadipai waterfalls
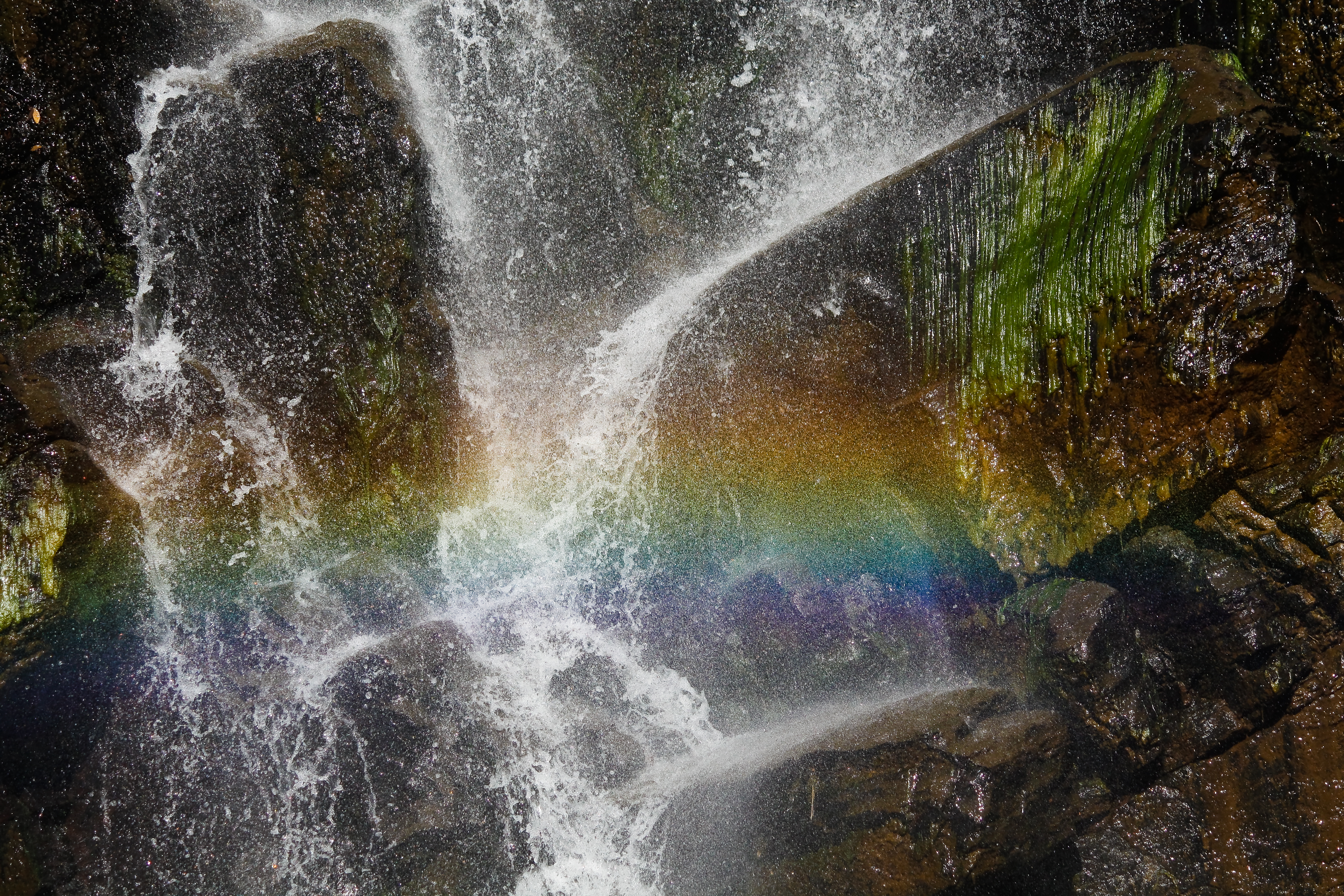
- Rainbow of Jadipai waterfall

- Location within Bangladesh
- Location: Ruma Upazila, Bandarban
- Coordinates: 21.5518°N 92.3256°E
- Type: waterfall

Jadipai Waterfall (Bengali: জাদিপাই ঝরনা) located at Ruma Upazila of Bandarban District is one of the widest water falls in Bangladesh. It is one of the most attractive tourist spots of Bangladesh. The flow of Jadipai fall becomes robust during the rainy season.

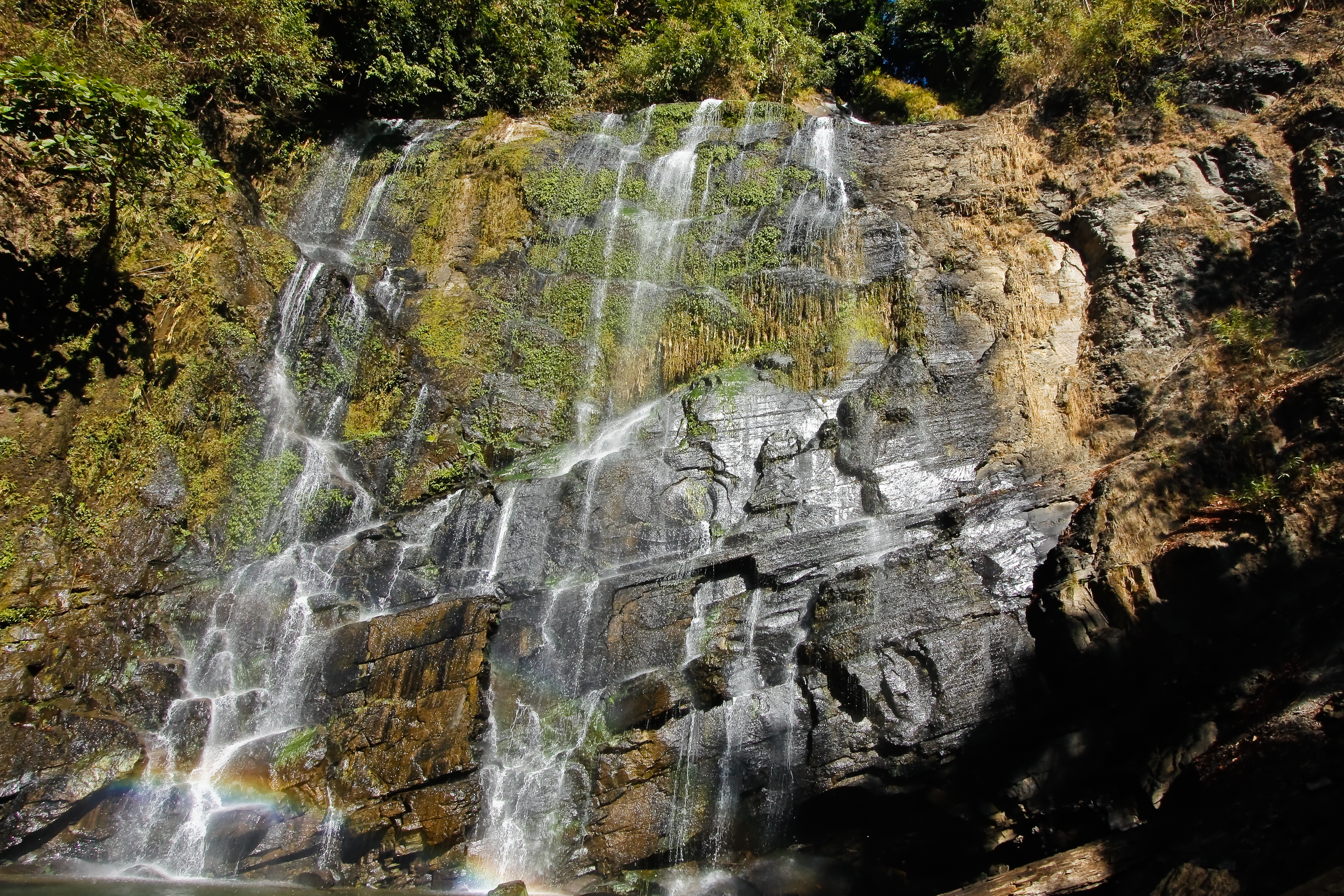
Jadipai Fall

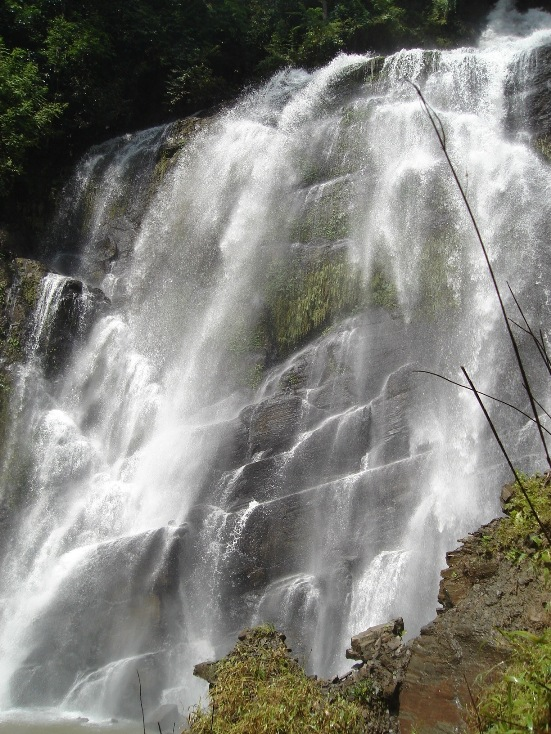
Jadipai waterfalls

== Location ==
It is located in Ruma Upazila of Bandarban District. It is about 30 minutes walking distance from Jadipai Para. The distance from Kiokradang hill in Bandarban to Jadipai Para is about one and a half kilometers.

== Tourists attraction ==
Jadipai Waterfall is accessible through a multi-stage journey from Bandarban. Visitors typically travel to Ruma Bazar by four-wheel-drive vehicle (Chander Gari), continue to Boga Lake, and then follow a trekking route via Keokradong before reaching the waterfall. The trail passes through the hillside settlements of Passing Para and Jadipai Para and includes narrow, winding, and steep sections that require careful footing. Due to the rugged terrain, the trek requires a moderate level of physical fitness.

The waterfall is a destination for trekking and nature tourism in Bandarban District and is noted for its mountainous surroundings and natural landscape.

== See also ==
- List of waterfalls in Bangladesh
