= Parikunda Waterfall =

Parikunda Waterfall (Parikunda Jhorna)
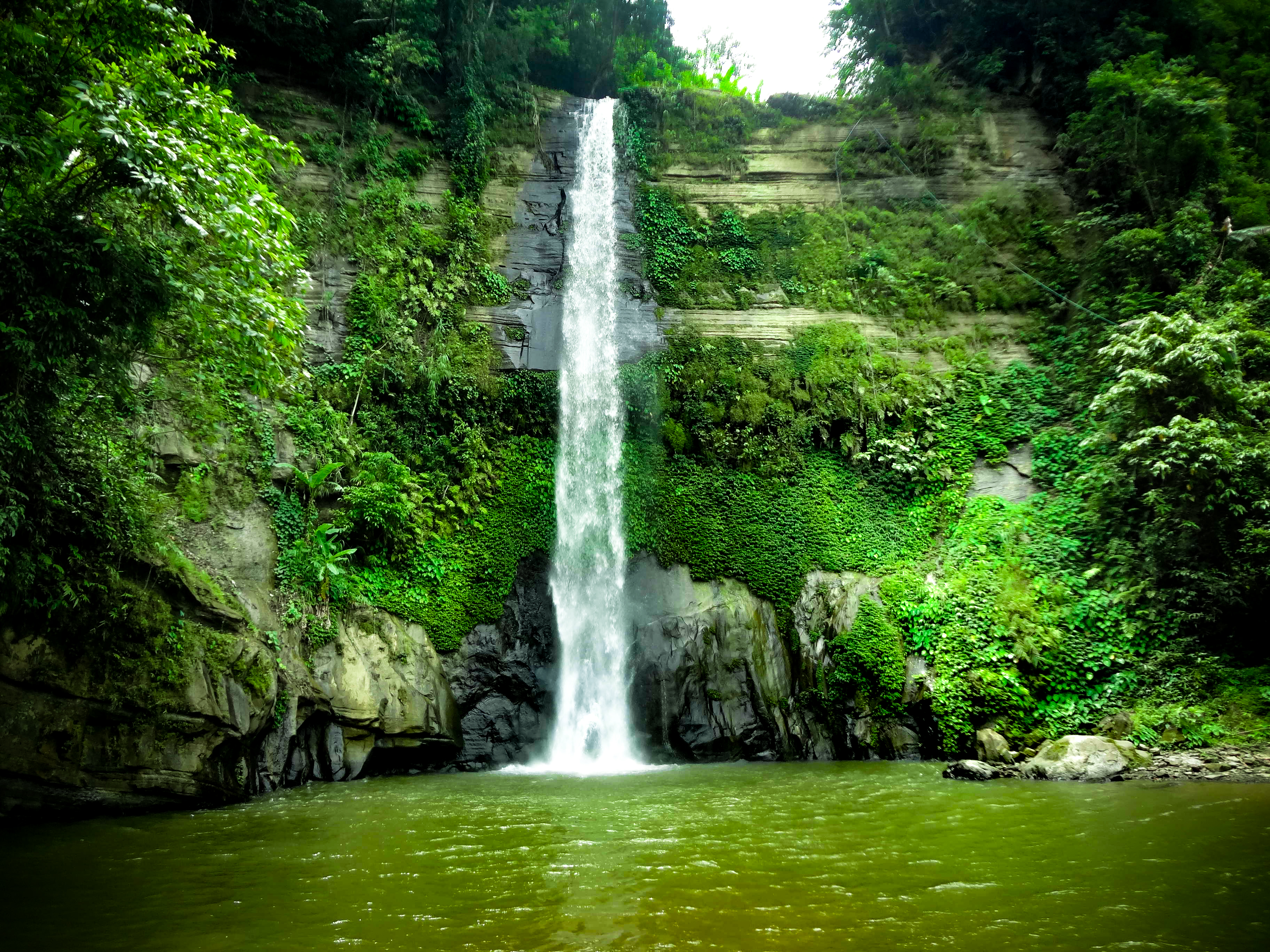
- Parikunda Waterfall beside Madhabkunda Waterfall
- Location: Barlekha, Moulvibazar, Bangladesh
- Total height: about 150 ft

Parikunda Waterfall, or Parikunda Jhorna, is a natural waterfall in Moulvibazar District, Bangladesh, falling from a height of about 150 feet from the local hills. The well-known “Madhabkunda Waterfall” is situated nearby.

== Location ==
It is located in “Patharia Hill” (formerly Adam Ail Hill) of Kathaltali Union, Barlekha, Moulvibazar, in Sylhet Division.

== Description ==
Parikunda Waterfall is relatively less known. Compared to Madhabkunda Waterfall, Parikunda is more secluded. The waterfall can be seen by following the stream opposite the Shiva Temple. The stream falls down about 150 feet from a steep rocky hill. During the rainy season, Parikunda Waterfall remains full of water.

== See also ==
- Madhabkunda Waterfall
- Madhabkunda Eco Park
- List of waterfalls in Bangladesh
