= Dhuppani Waterfall =

- White Waterfall
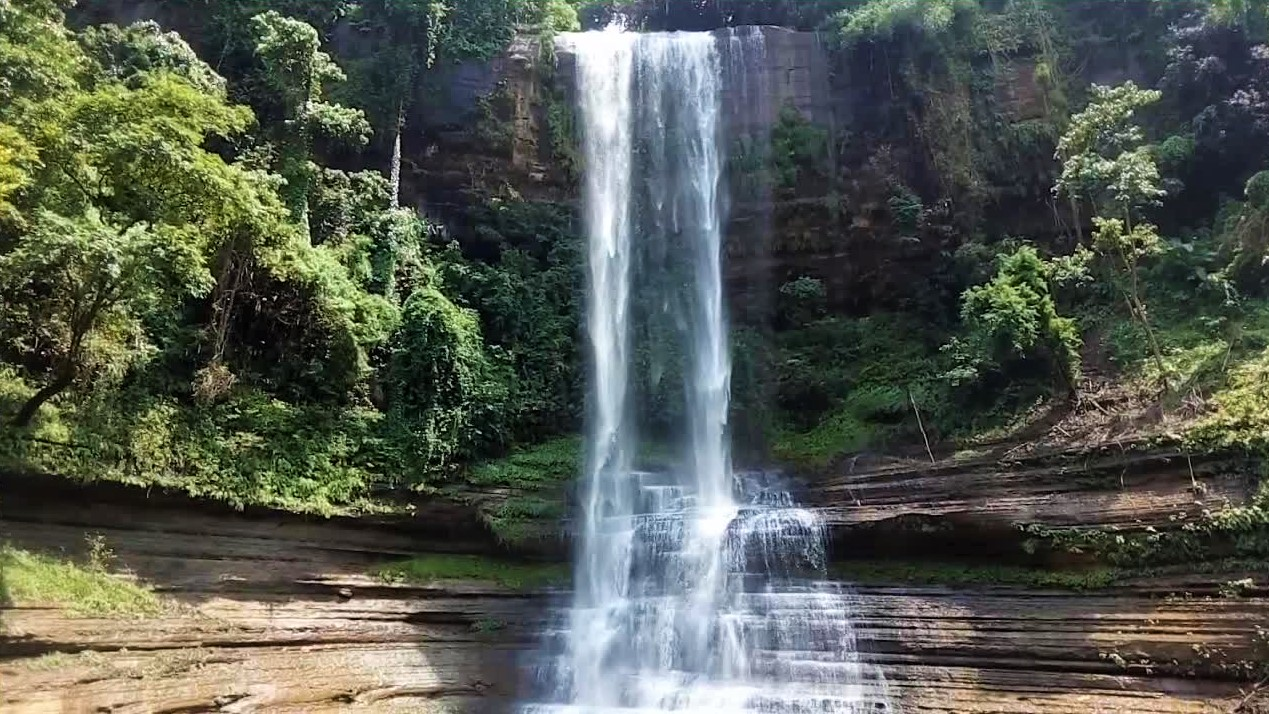
- Upper view of Dhuppani Waterfall

- Location within Bangladesh
- Location: Belaichhari Upazila, Rangamati District, Bangladesh
- Coordinates: 22.4140458°N 92.4123124°E
- Type: Single-drop waterfall
- Total height: 150 ft (46 m)
- Number of drops: 1

Dhuppani Waterfall is a waterfall located in Belaichhari Upazila of Rangamati District, Bangladesh, situated in a place called Oracchari under Farua Union. Locals also call it Duppani Waterfall. In the local language, Dhuppani means white water, so it is also known as the White Waterfall.

== Special instructions ==
Since Belaichhari Upazila is part of the Chittagong Hill Tracts, visitors from other regions of Bangladesh are required to carry a personal National ID card, passport photocopy, or any valid identity card. These documents must be shown at various Bangladesh Army camps to get permission to enter the area.

== Gallery ==
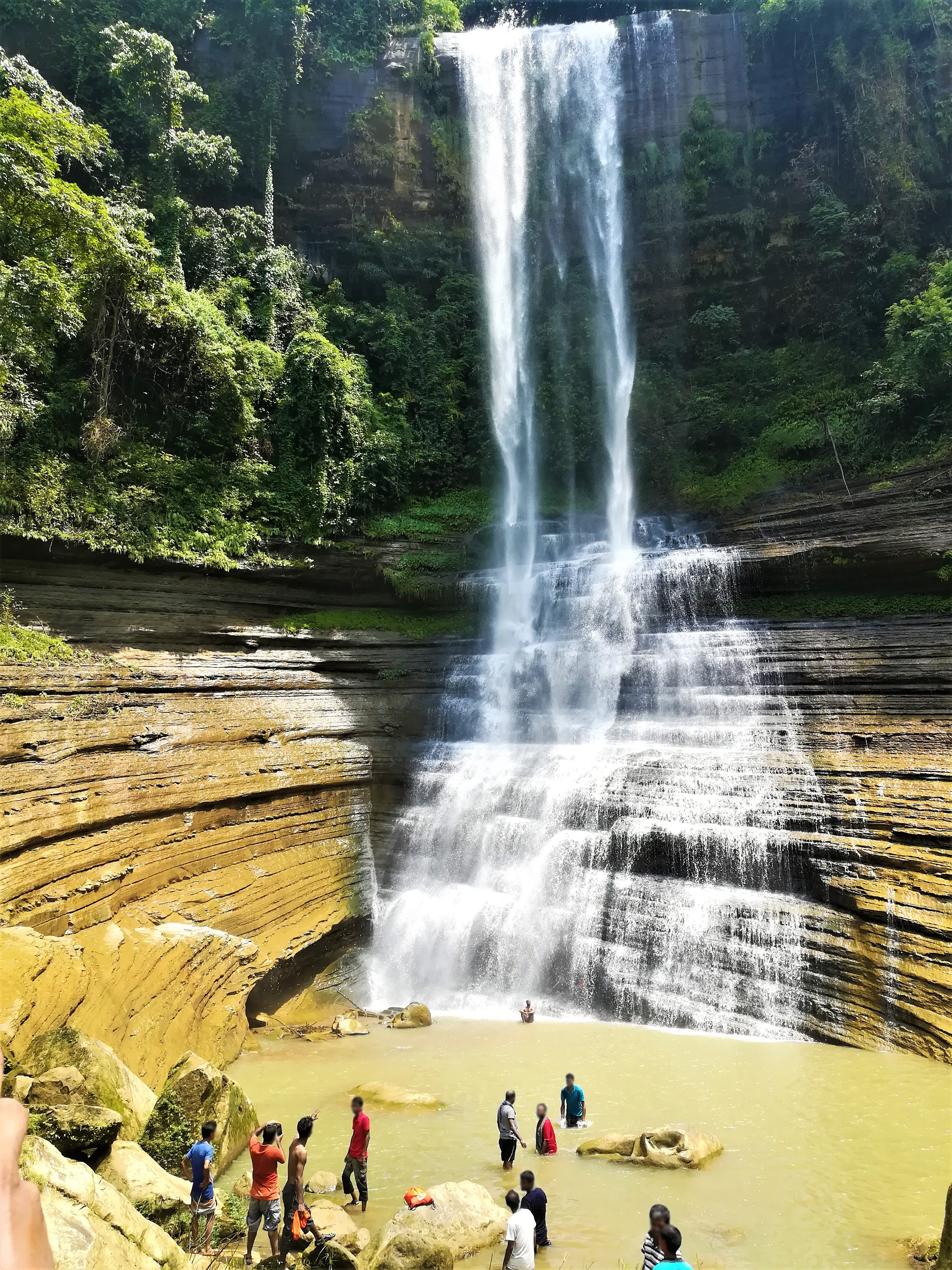
Dhuppani Waterfall

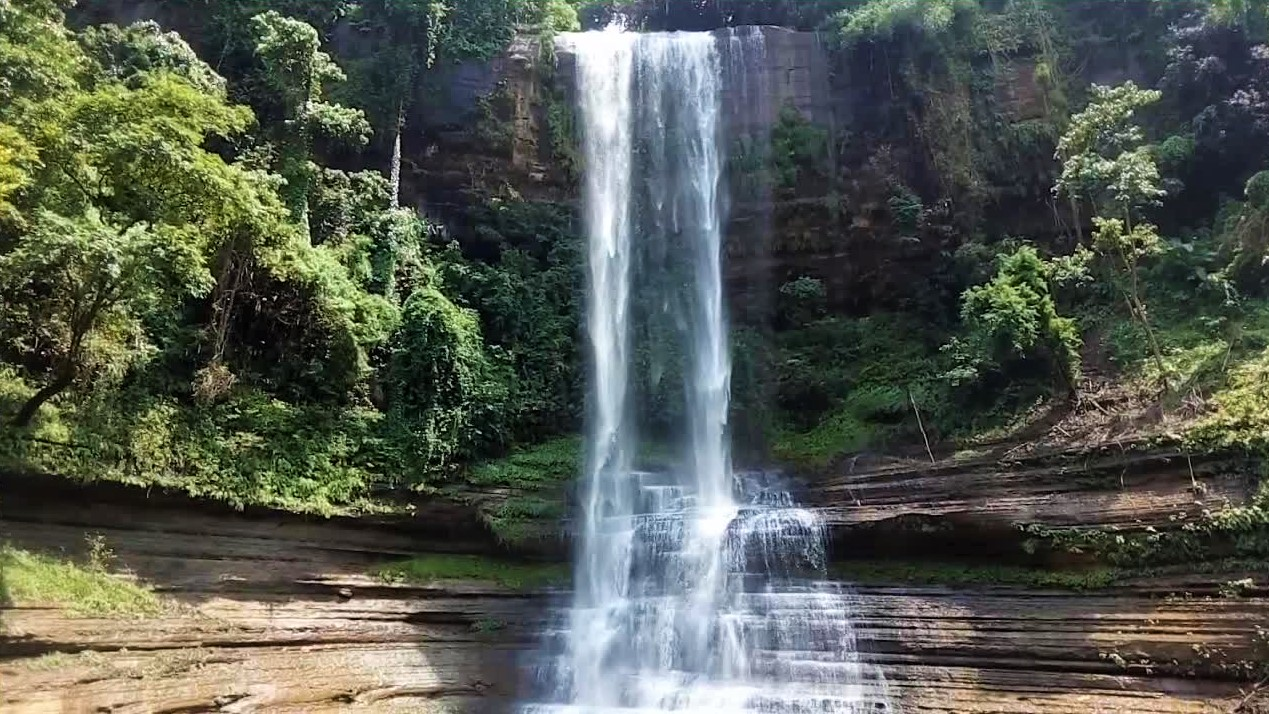
Upper view of Dhuppani Waterfall

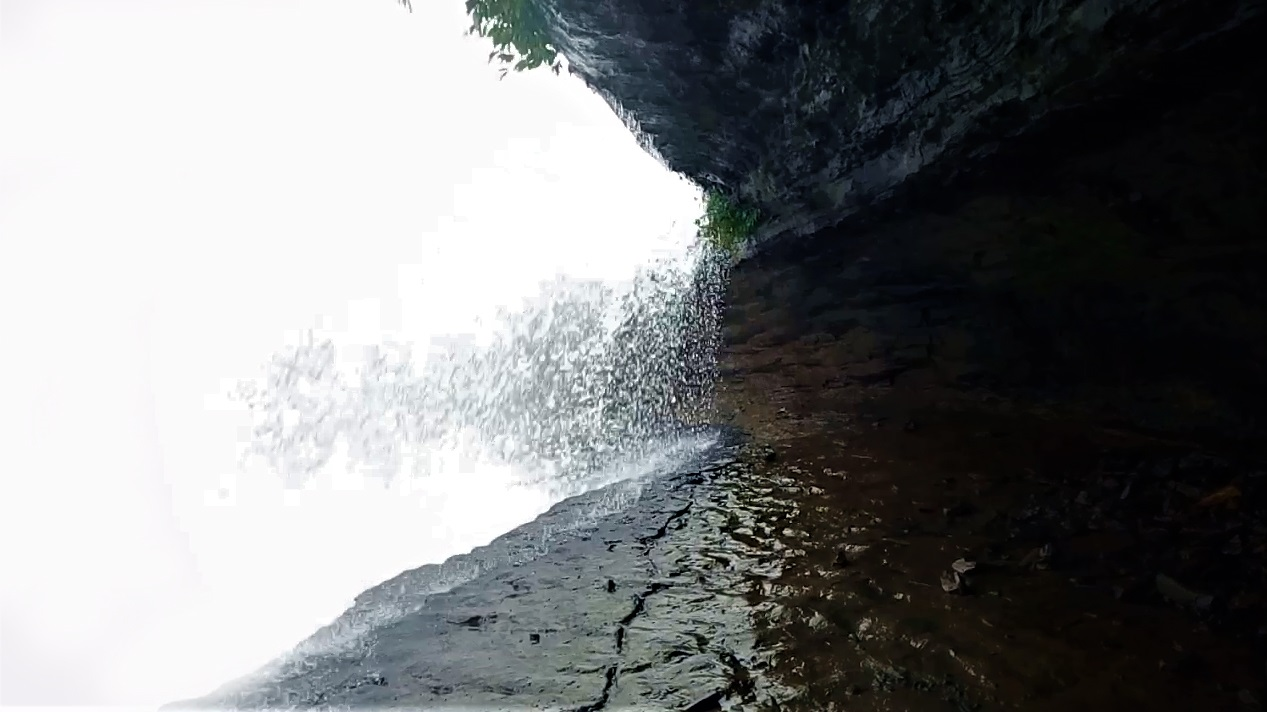
Inside cave view of Dhuppani Waterfall

== See also ==
- List of waterfalls in Bangladesh
