= Mora Waterfall =

Mora Jhorna
- Location: Jaintiapur, Sylhet, Bangladesh
- Type: waterfall
- Watercourse: medium

Mora Jhorna (Bengali: মরা ঝরনা) is a natural waterfall located in Kharampur, Sreepur, under Jaintiapur Upazila in the Sylhet Division of Bangladesh. The waterfall is seasonal in nature. It has minimal to no water flow for much of the year, but during the monsoon, its flow increases substantially.

== Location ==
Mora waterfall is situated next to Aduri waterfall. During the monsoon season, the waterfall's flow increases.

== See also ==
- Bichnakandi
- Lalakhal
