= Chingri Waterfall =

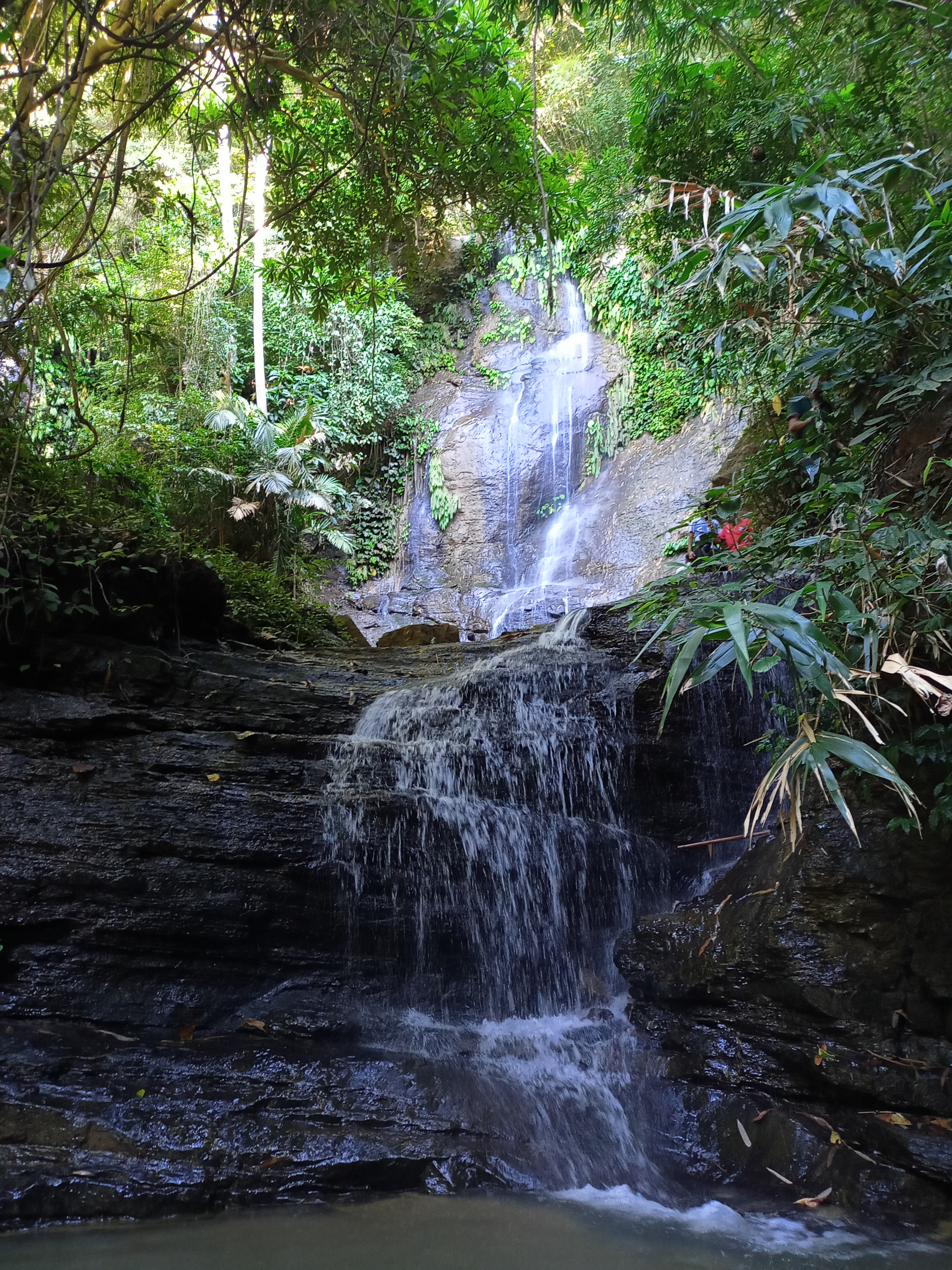
- Location: Bandarban, Bangladesh

Chingri Waterfall is a waterfall located in Ruma Upazila of Bandarban District, Bangladesh. It is a popular natural tourist attraction in the Chittagong Hill Tracts, known for its scenic beauty and hilly environment. The name "Chingri Jharna" (Shrimp Waterfall) originated because the stones accumulated beneath the water stream resemble the shape of a shrimp.

== Location ==
Chingri Waterfall is situated in Ruma Upazila of Bandarban District, about 20–25 kilometers away from Ruma Bazaar. To reach the waterfall, one has to walk with the help of a local guide, crossing hilly paths and rivers from Ruma Bazaar. On the way from Boga Lake to Keokradong, Chingri Waterfall can be seen after walking for about an hour along a mountain trail. From below, only a small portion of the waterfall is visible. To see the main fall, one has to cross large slippery rocks and then turn 90 degrees to the right.

== Features ==
Chingri Waterfall is essentially a mountain stream cascading down from a high hill. During the rainy season, the water flow becomes stronger and more adventurous. The surrounding area is covered with dense forest, wild plants, and various species of birds and animals. This makes the place very popular among nature lovers and tourists.

== See also ==
- List of waterfalls in Bangladesh
