= Sangrampunji Waterfall =

- Location: Gowainghat, Sylhet, Bangladesh

Sangrampunji Waterfall is a waterfall in Gowainghat Upazila, Sylhet District, Bangladesh. It is located about 62 km northeast of Sylhet city, near the India–Meghalaya border, at the foothills of the Khasi–Jainta hills, about 1 km west of Jaflong Zero Point. The combination of hills, waterfalls, and rivers makes the place attractive to tourists.

== Description ==
The waterfall is located in Jaflong, a border tourism area in Sylhet. On the other side lies the mountain ranges of Dawki in India.

There are five Khasi settlements across Balla, Sangrampunji, Nokshiapunji, Lamapunji, and Protapur in Jaflong. According to the census, 1,953 Khasi people live in Jaflong. Since the waterfall is situated in Sangrampunji, it is popularly known as Sangrampunji Waterfall.

== Attractions ==
The waterfall originates from a stream descending from the high Dawki hills inside Indian territory. It is one of the major tourist attractions. During the monsoon season, heavy rainfall revives the waterfall, making it overflow with water. The clarity of the water is another reason for its appeal. In addition, the cloud-covered mountain peaks create a scenic view. During rains, clouds, rain, hills, and rivers together create an enchanting and mystical beauty. Hence, many people also call it the "Magical Waterfall."

The multi-step cascade can be heard roaring from a distance. Upon reaching, one can see the beautiful combination of trees, rocks, and flowing water. Streams of crystal-clear water descend from the hillside in several branches—sometimes through green bushes, sometimes over bare rocks. The waterfall creates a small pool below, surrounded by large stones on three sides. During the monsoon, the spot becomes crowded with nature lovers. However, as it is not as well-known as Madhabkunda or Bichnakandi, the crowd is relatively smaller.

== Communication ==
In the 1980s, a 55-kilometer road was built connecting Sylhet with Jaflong, establishing road communication with other parts of the country. The road distance from Sylhet Sadar to Jaflong is 56 km. From Jaflong Zero Point, one must cross the Piyain River by boat to reach Sangrampunji. In the rainy season, boats go directly to the waterfall, while in the dry season, visitors must walk 10–15 minutes after disembarking to reach it.

== See also ==
- List of waterfalls in Bangladesh
