= Toiduchara Waterfall =

- Location: Dighinala, Khagrachhari, Bangladesh
- Total height: 300 ft (91 m)

Toiduchara Waterfall is located in Dighinala Upazila of Khagrachhari District, Bangladesh. In the Tripura language, Toidu means water gate and chhara means waterfall.

== Description ==
Toiduchara Waterfall is 300 feet high. There are numerous rocky steps along the hillside. Water flows down over these steps. This natural feature gives the waterfall a distinctive character. Among the tourist attractions in Khagrachhari, Toiduchara is one of the most notable. The stream of the waterfall flows through the folds of the forested hills. On the right side of Toiduchara, there is another waterfall named Thangzhang Waterfall at the top of the hill. The water of Thangzhang has created a small stream, from which Toiduchara originates.

== See also ==
- List of waterfalls in Bangladesh
