= Muppochora Waterfall =

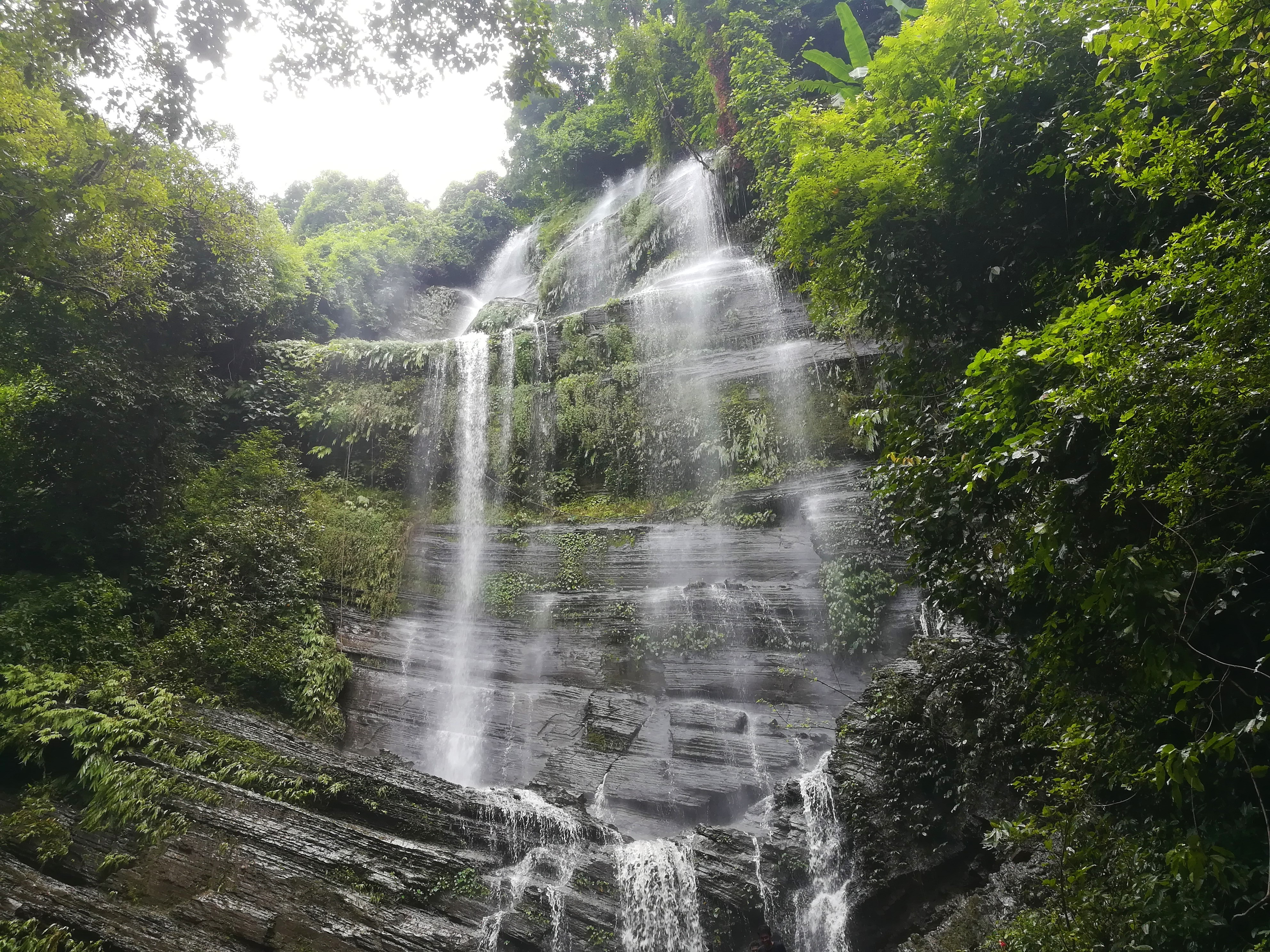
- Muppochora Waterfall

- Location within Bangladesh
- Location: Belaichhari Upazila, Rangamati District, Bangladesh
- Coordinates: 22.5053144°N 92.3627159°E
- Type: Single waterfall
- Number of drops: 1

Muppochora Waterfall is located in Bangalkata area of Belaichhari Upazila in Rangamati District. Although it has only one stream, it is one of the widest waterfalls in Bangladesh.

== Location ==
Belaichhari Upazila of Rangamati is situated on the edge of Kaptai Lake. There is no road connectivity to this upazila. It can only be reached by waterways from Kaptai Upazila. Being a remote hilly area, the upazila contains numerous small and large hills as well as many waterfalls. The name Belaichhari originates from the Chakma language. In Chakma, "Belai" means cat and "Chhari" means a waterfall or stream flowing from a hill. Muppochora Waterfall is one of the largest waterfalls in Belaichhari. Its location is in Bangalkata, which can be reached by boat from Belaichhari, and from Bangalkata to Muppochora only by walking.

== Special guidelines ==
Since Belaichhari Upazila is part of the Chittagong Hill Tracts, visitors from other parts of Bangladesh are required to carry a personal national identity card, or a photocopy of a passport, or any other identification document. These documents must be shown at various Bangladesh Army camps to gain access to those areas.

== Gallery ==
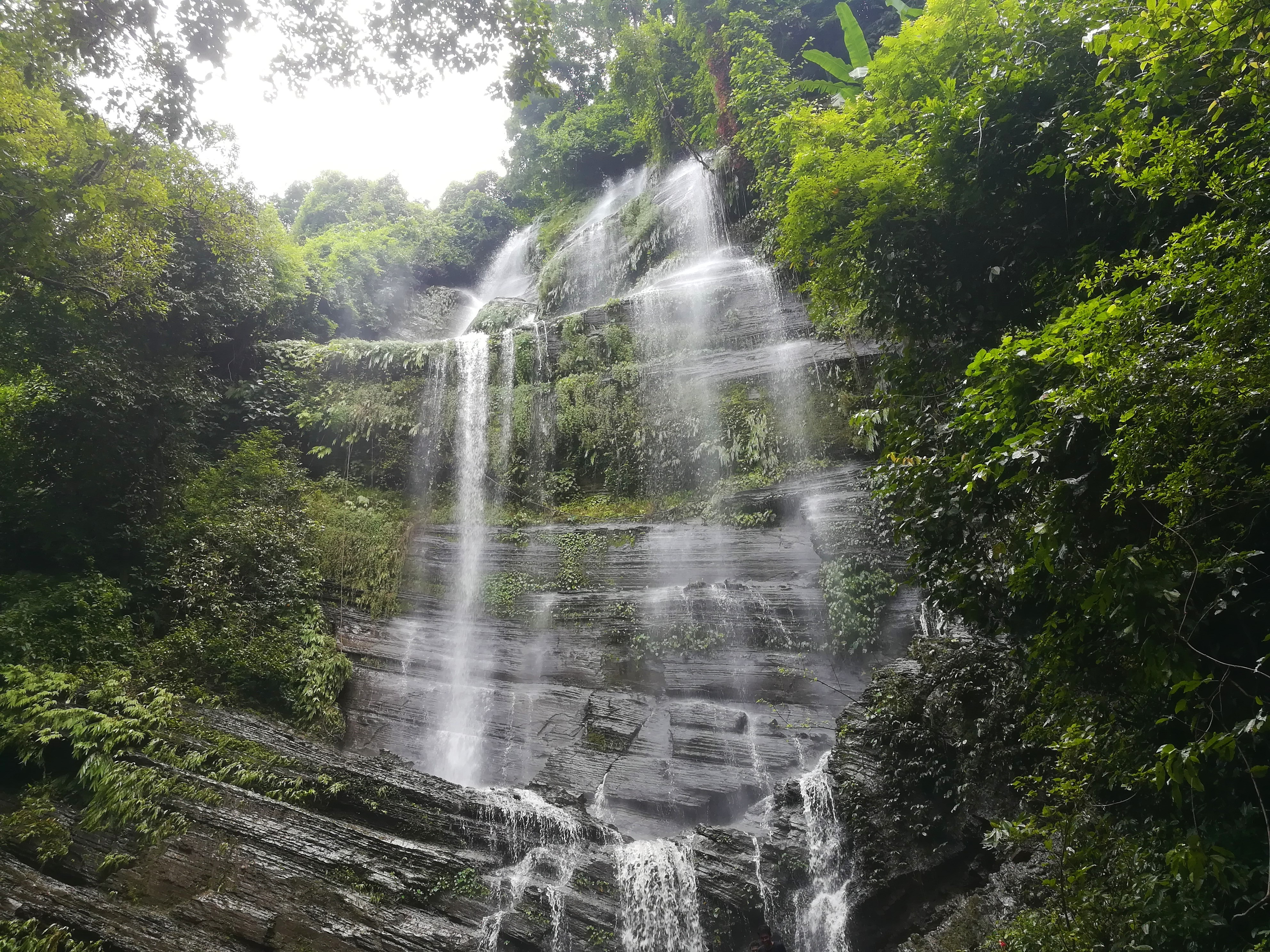
Muppochora Waterfall

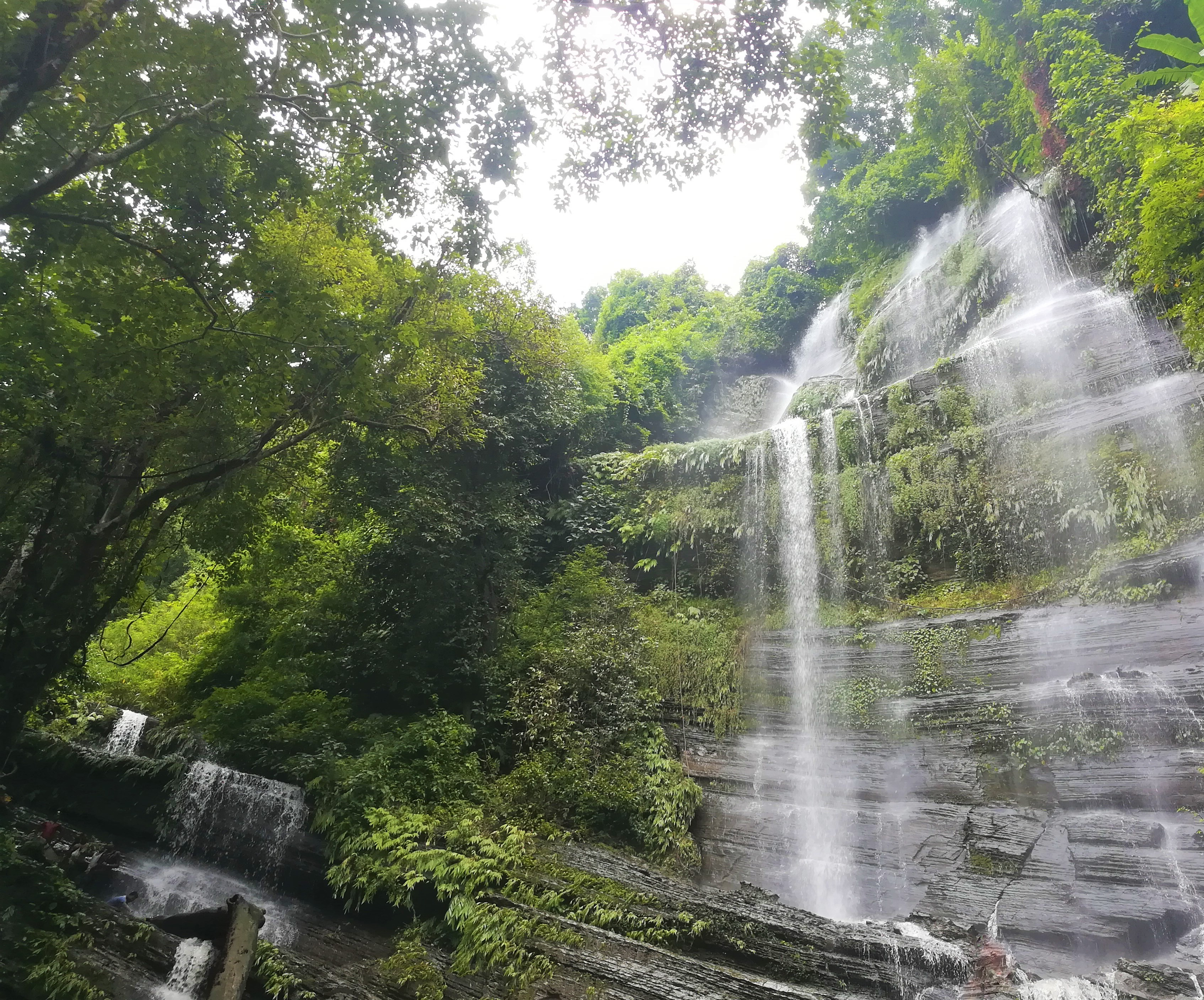
Muppochora Waterfall and its adjacent stream

== See also ==
- List of waterfalls in Bangladesh
