= Shoilo Propat =

Waterfall in Bandarban, Bangladesh

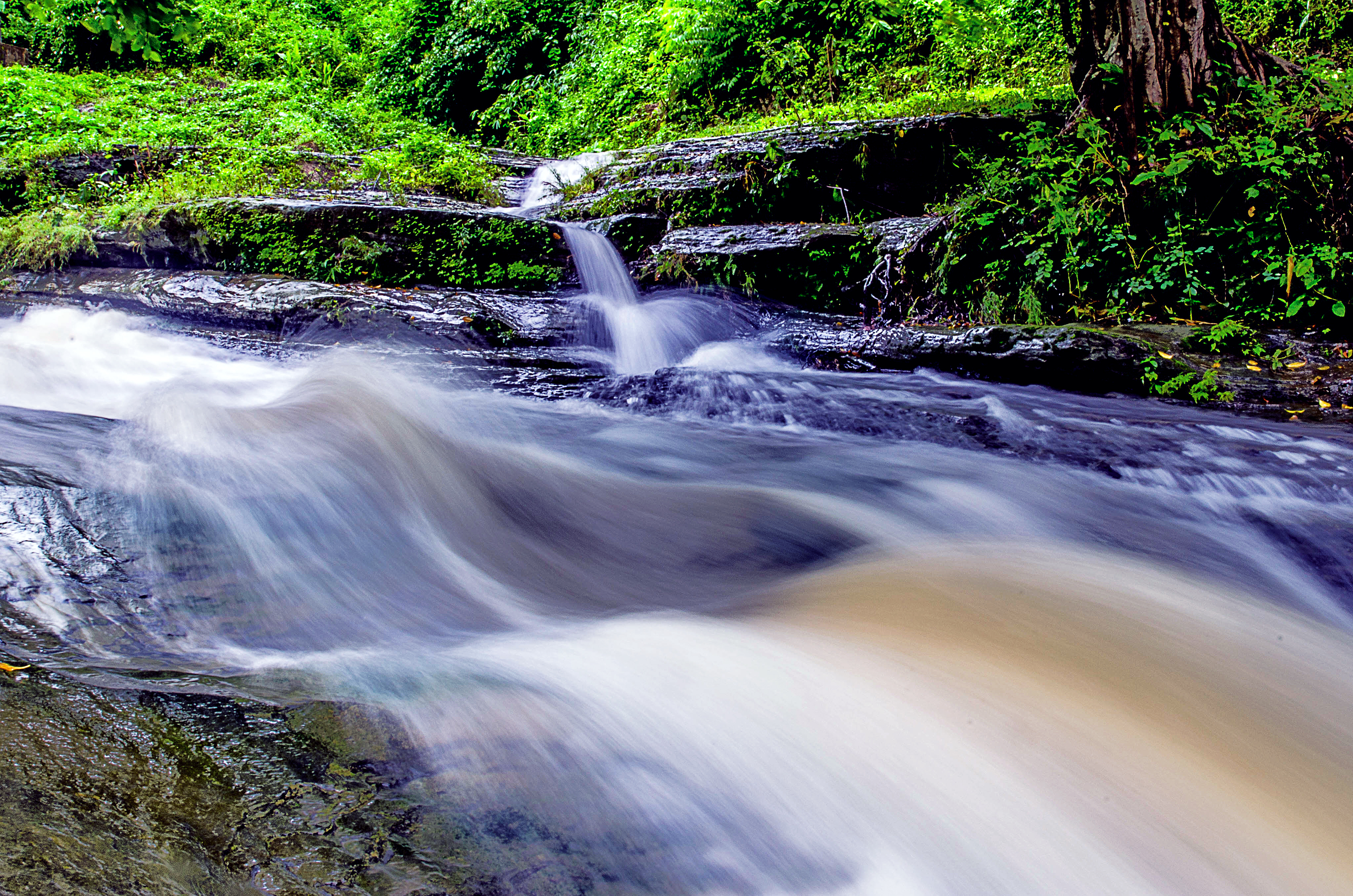
- Shoilo Prapat waterfall

- Location within Bangladesh
- Location: Milanchhari, Bandarban
- Coordinates: 22.15081°N 92.2164°E
- Type: waterfall

Shoilo Propat (Bengali: শৈল প্রপাত) is a natural waterfall located near the town of Bandarban in the Chittagong Hill Tracts of Bangladesh. The waterfall is among the most visited and easily accessible natural attractions in the area.

== Etymology ==
Over the course of time, Shoilo Propat has appeared under multiple variant spellings: “Shoylo Propat”, “Shoilopropat”, “Shailo Propat”, “Shailopropat”, etc.

== Location ==
Shoilo Propat is situated at Milanchhari along the road from Bandarban town toward Thanchi / Ruma.

The waterfall lies approximately 4–8 kilometers from Bandarban town. Because of this proximity and its roadside‑accessible nature, it is relatively easier to visit than many remote waterfalls in the hilly region.

== Characteristics ==
The waterfall is described as a rock‑plate waterfall since water flows over sloping rocks/stone plates and cascades into a shallow pool or stream.

The water is noted to be cool and clear as even outside the high‑flow (monsoon) season.

During the monsoon or rainy season (roughly June–September), the water flow becomes significantly stronger and more dramatic, thus making the waterfall more strongly "alive" and scenic. In the drier months, when flow is lower, the rocky waterfall and surrounding hills/forest still give it a scenic value.

Because the waterfall is modest, the pool or stream at the base tends to be shallow which is more suitable for wading or "cool dip" than actual swimming.

== Features ==
The waterfall and its water has served as a source of drinking water and household water supply for local indigenous communities (mostly to the Bawm people) living around the hills. Because of water availability and tourism, several small villages have grown near the site.

Small market areas are present near it as well as local women of the indigenous community sell handmade handicrafts, hand‑loom textiles (shawls, blankets, sheets, mufflers), bamboo/cane goods, and seasonal fruits.

== Gallery ==
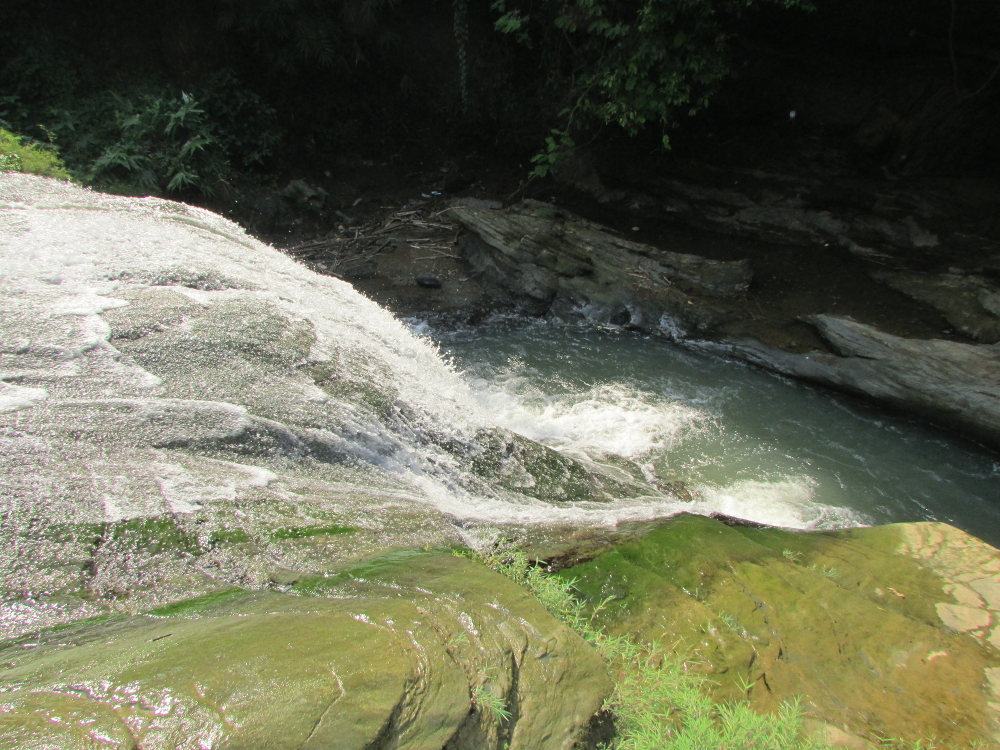

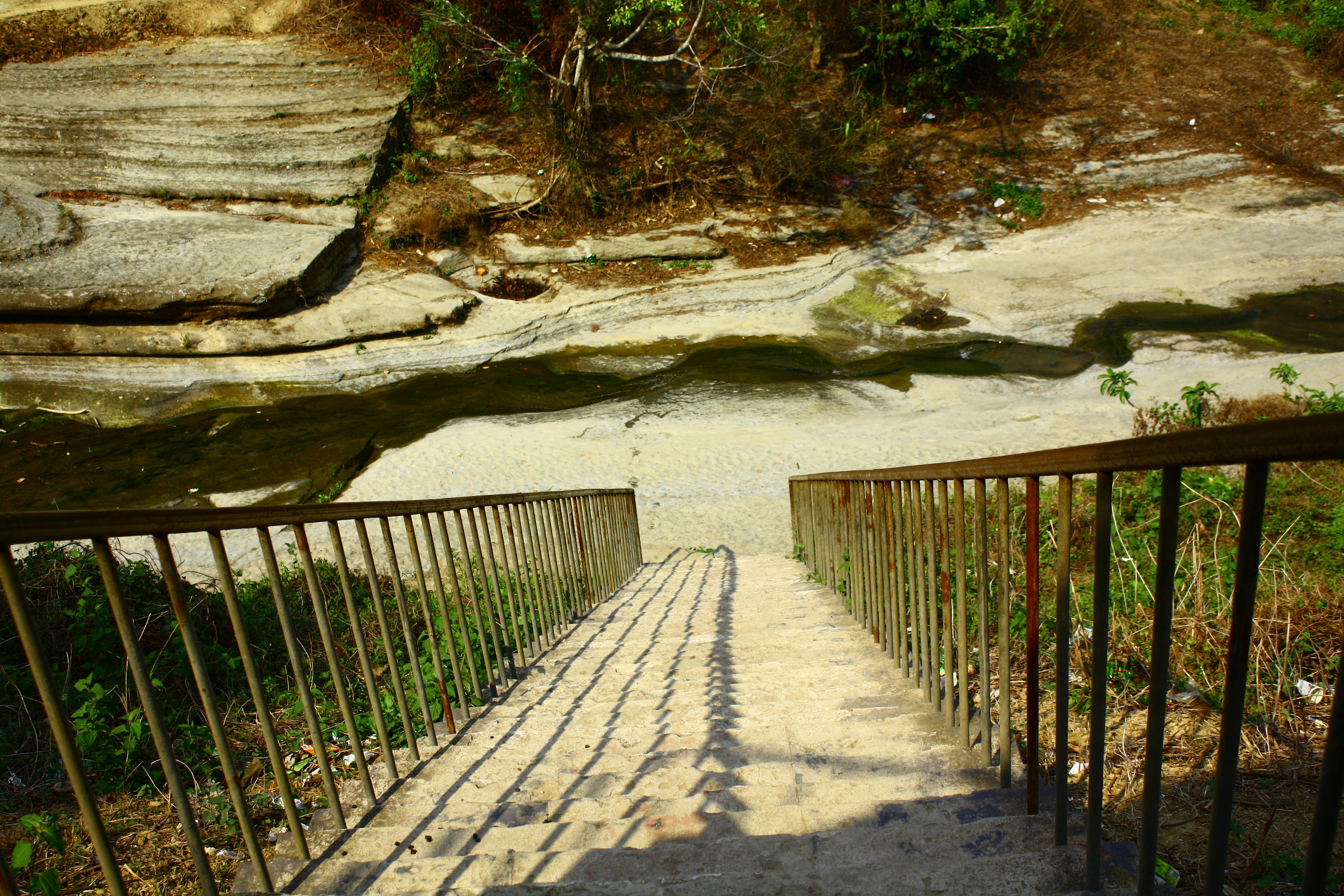

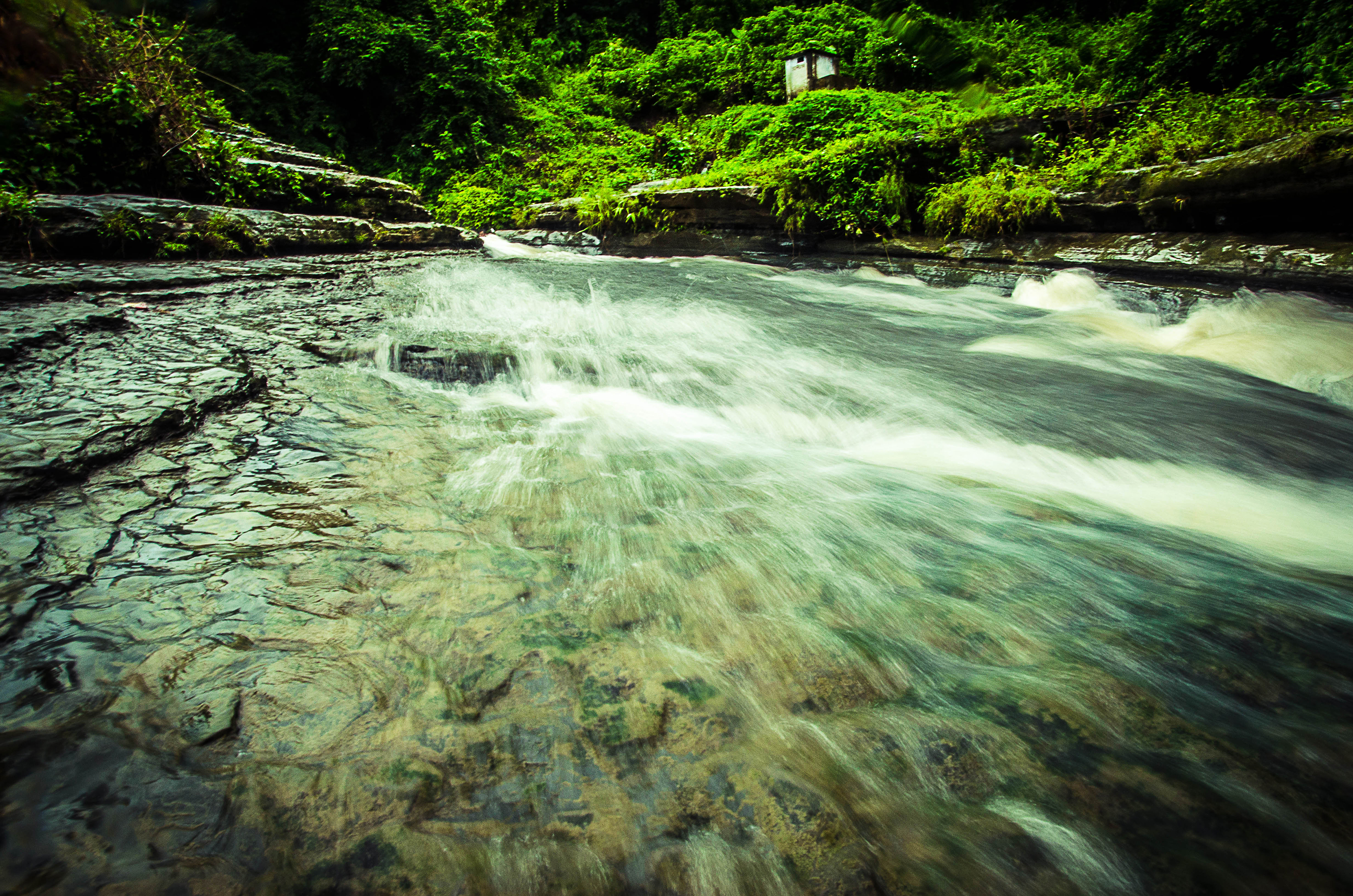

== See also ==
- List of waterfalls in Bangladesh
