= Rijuk Waterfall =

Coordinates: 22.0154°N 92.4018°E

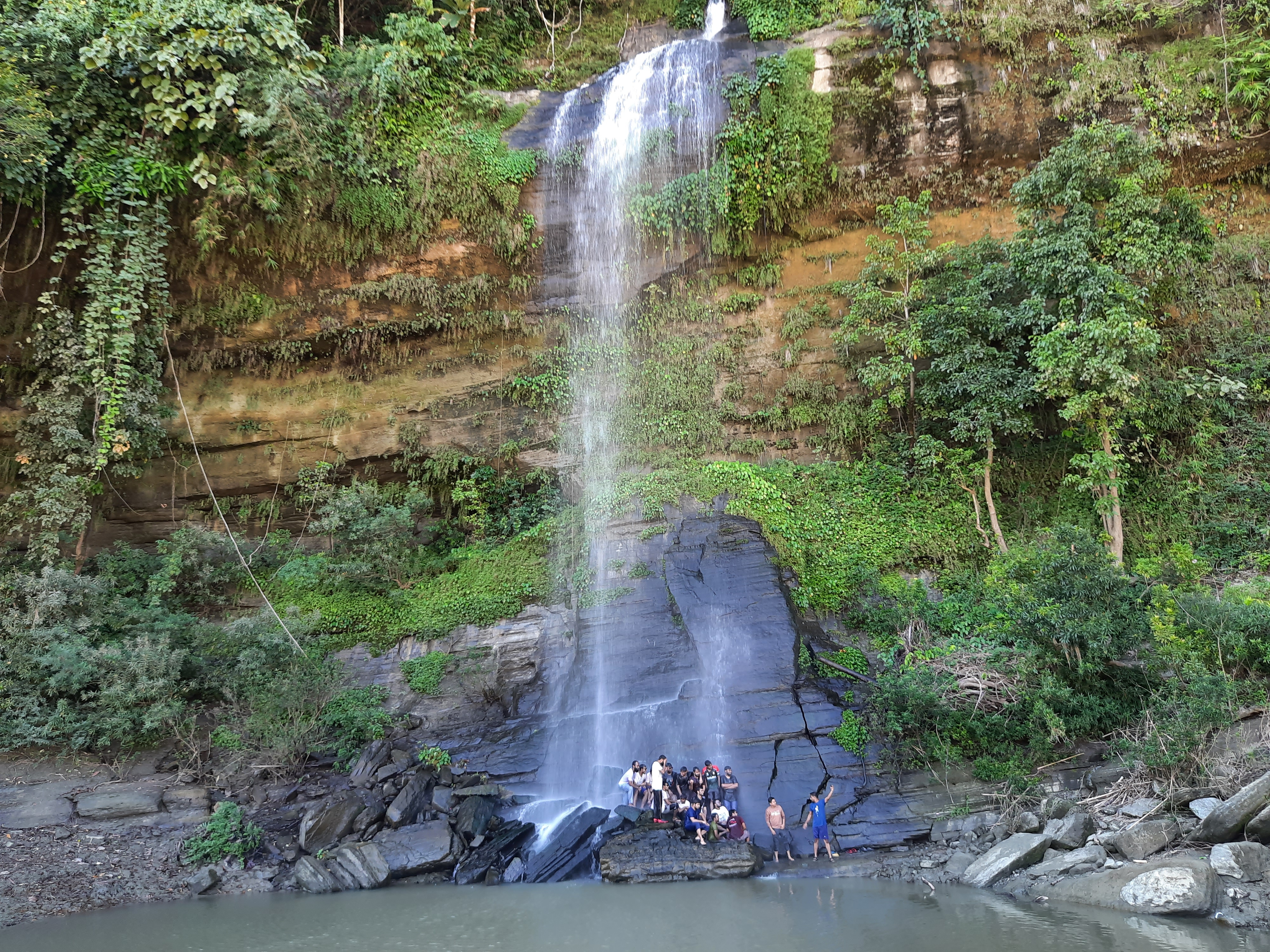
- Interactive map of Rijuk Waterfall
- Location: Bandarban, Chittagong Hill Tracts, Bangladesh
- Type: Waterfall
- Total height: 300 ft
- Watercourse: Sangu River

Rijuk Waterfall (also known as Rijuk Jhorna) is a natural waterfall located in Ruma Upazila of Bandarban District, Bangladesh.

== Location ==
The waterfall is situated about 66 kilometers from Bandarban town and 7 kilometers from Ruma Upazila, in Pantola mouza. Water falls from a height of approximately 300 feet directly into the Sangu River.

== Features ==
Water flows throughout the year, but the current is strongest from July to August.

== See also ==
- List of waterfalls in Bangladesh
