= Shuvolong Waterfall =

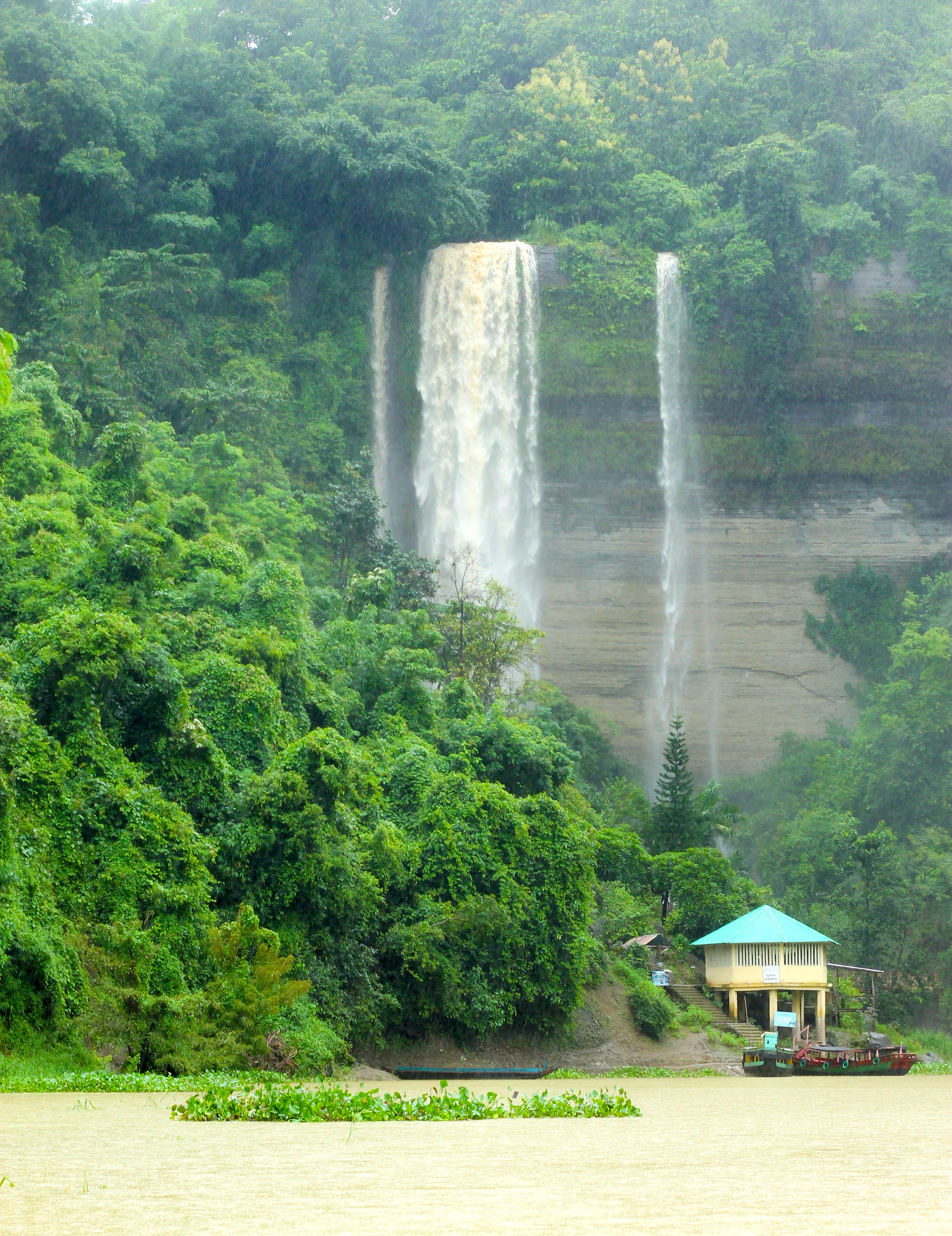
- Location: Barkal, Rangamati, Bangladesh
- Type: Hill waterfall

Shuvolong Waterfall is a tall hill waterfall in Bangladesh. It is located in Chilar Dak area of Subolong Union No. 1 under Barkal Upazila of greater Rangamati District, on the banks of Kaptai Lake in the basin of the Karnaphuli River. The waterfall can be seen before reaching Subolong Bazaar by waterways. It is a popular tourist spot during monsoon season. At Shuvolong Waterfall, there are some facilities and restaurants run by the Bangladesh Parjatan Corporation.

== Description ==
Shuvolong Waterfall is accessible only by water transport, as it is surrounded by steep hills and forested terrain with no direct road connection. It is located approximately 25 km from Rangamati town by water route. Visitors typically reach the site by boat across Kaptai Lake from Rangamati town.

During the dry season, the flow of the waterfall decreases significantly and may cease altogether during periods of drought. During the monsoon season, increased rainfall causes the waterfall to descend from a height of approximately 300 feet (91 m) into Kaptai Lake.

== Gallery ==
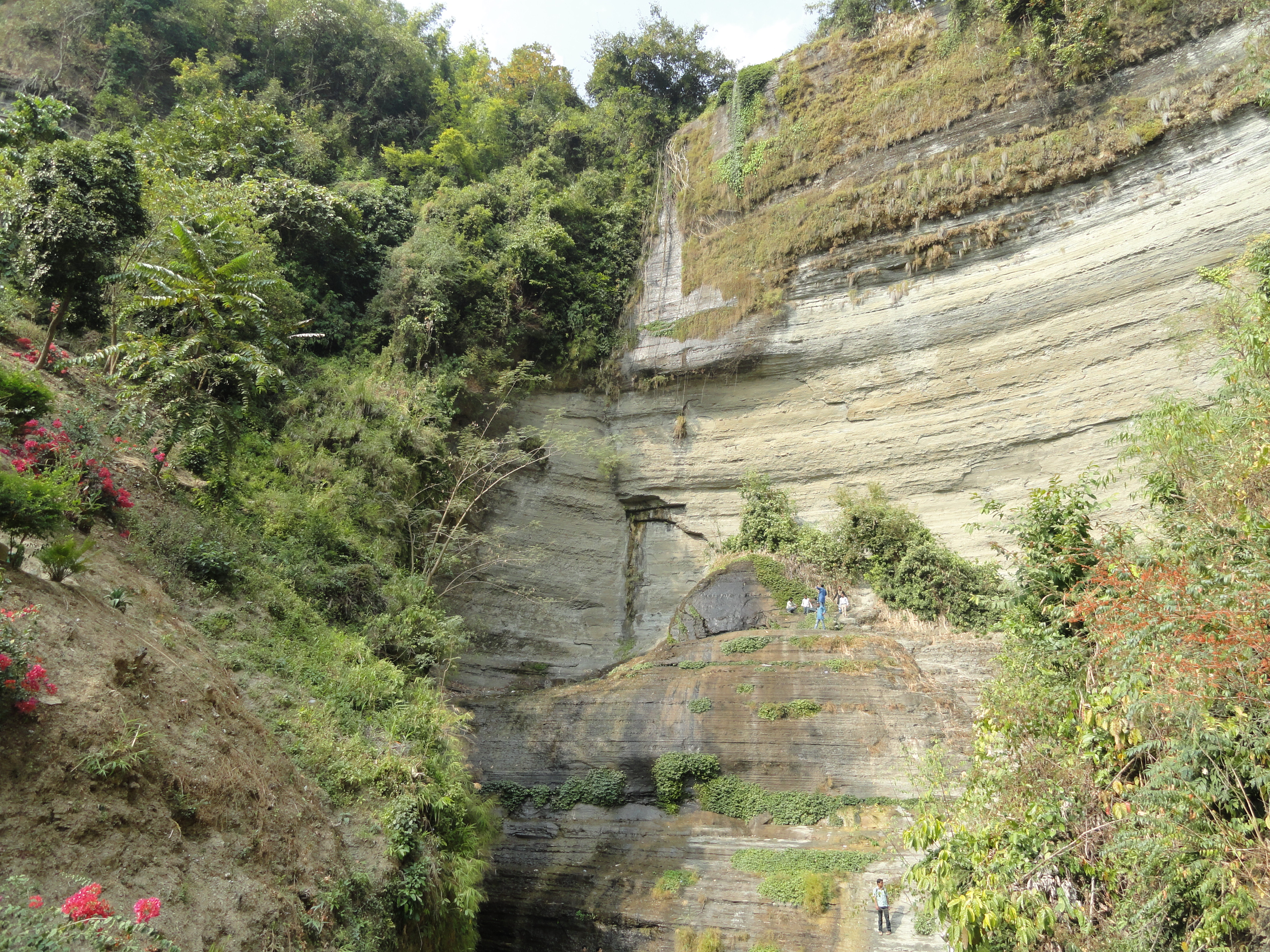

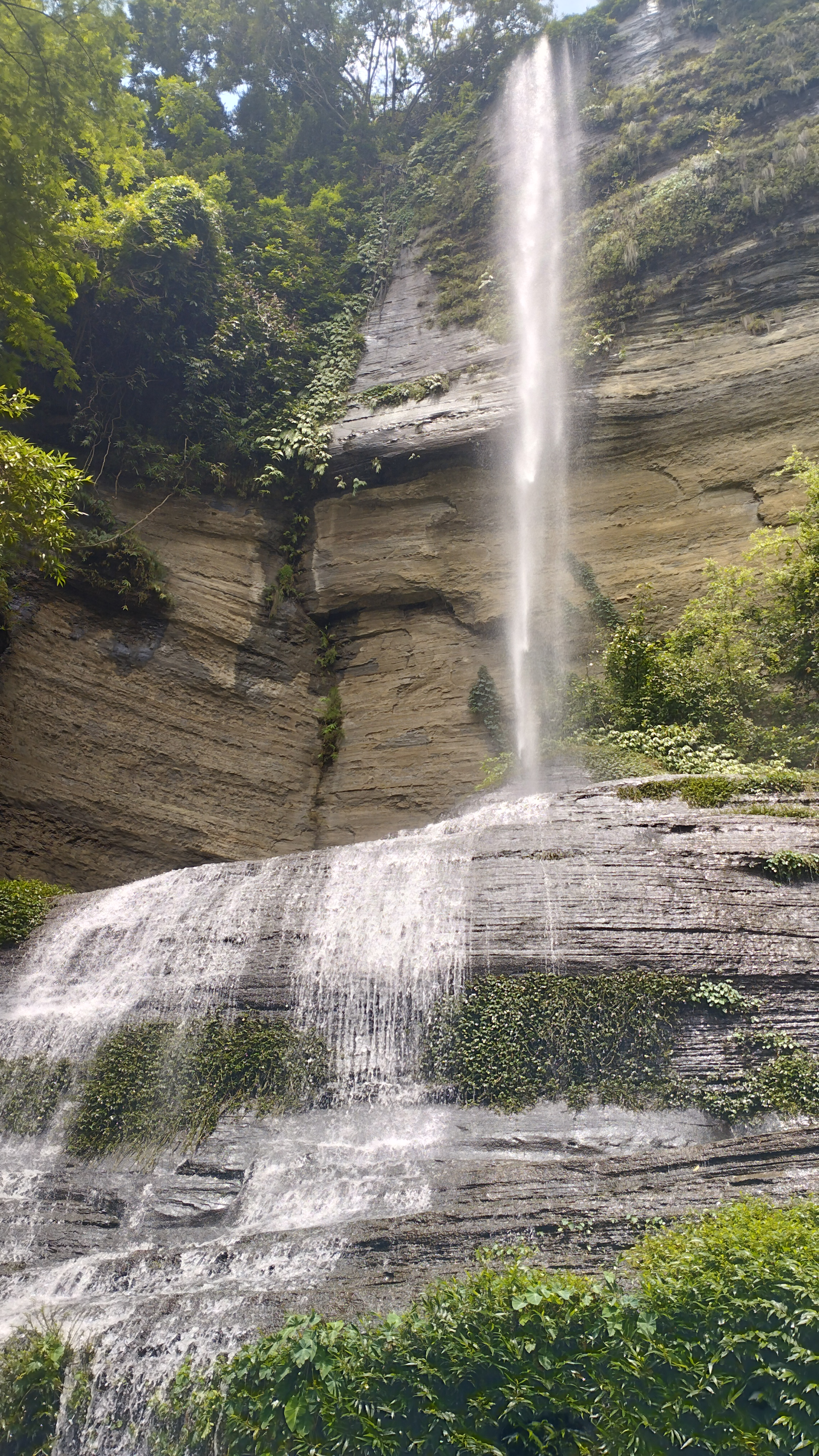

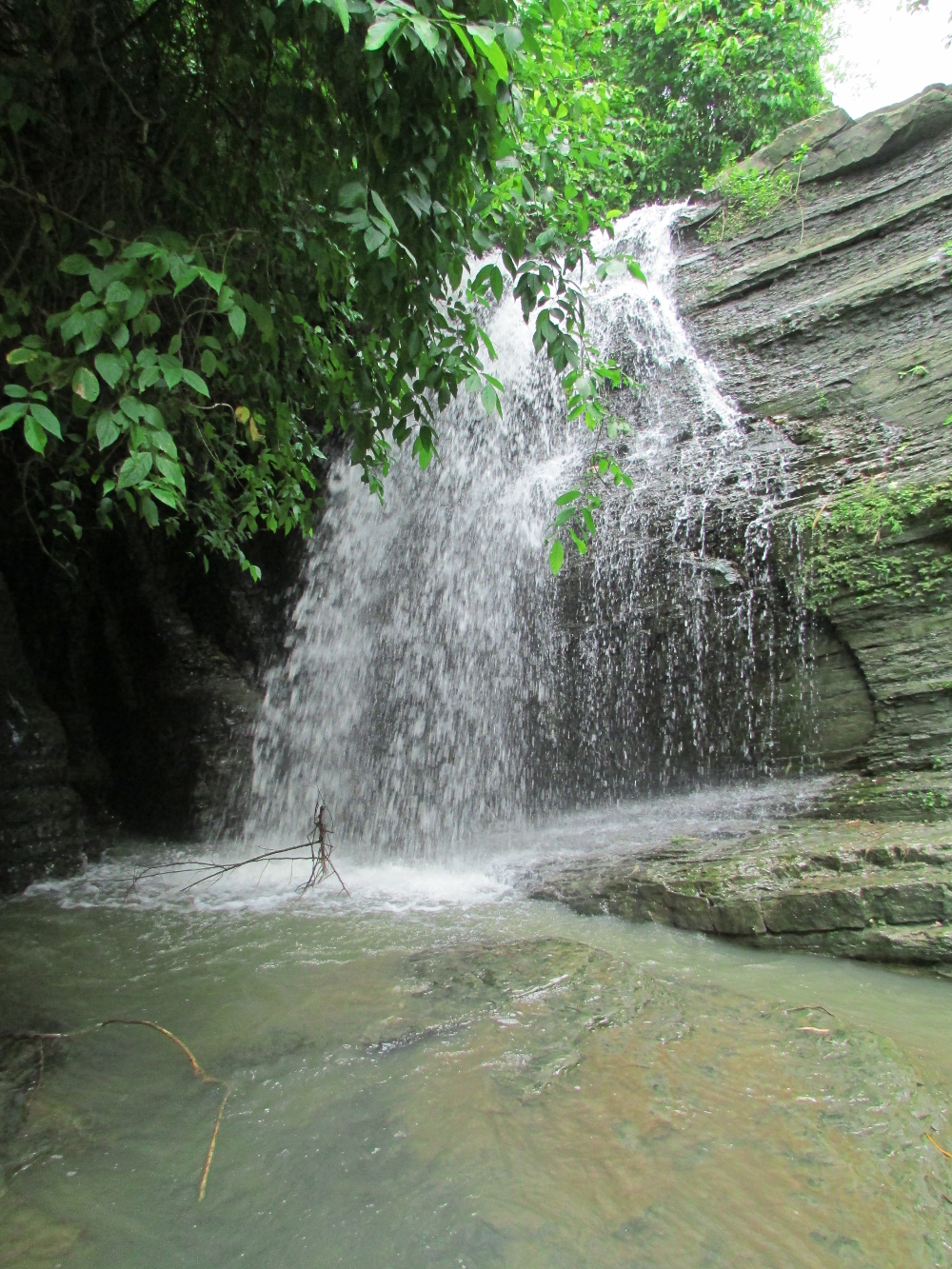

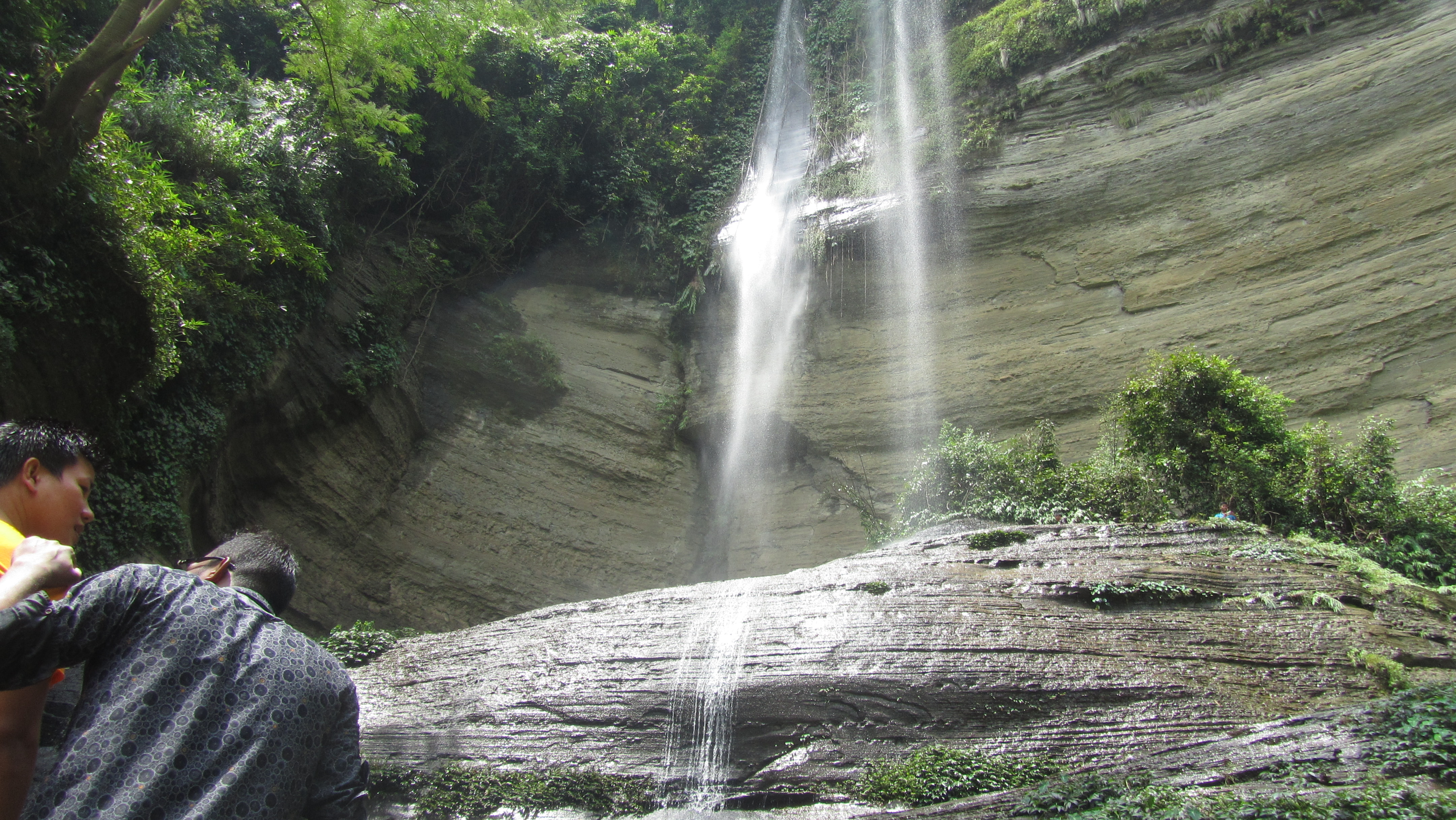

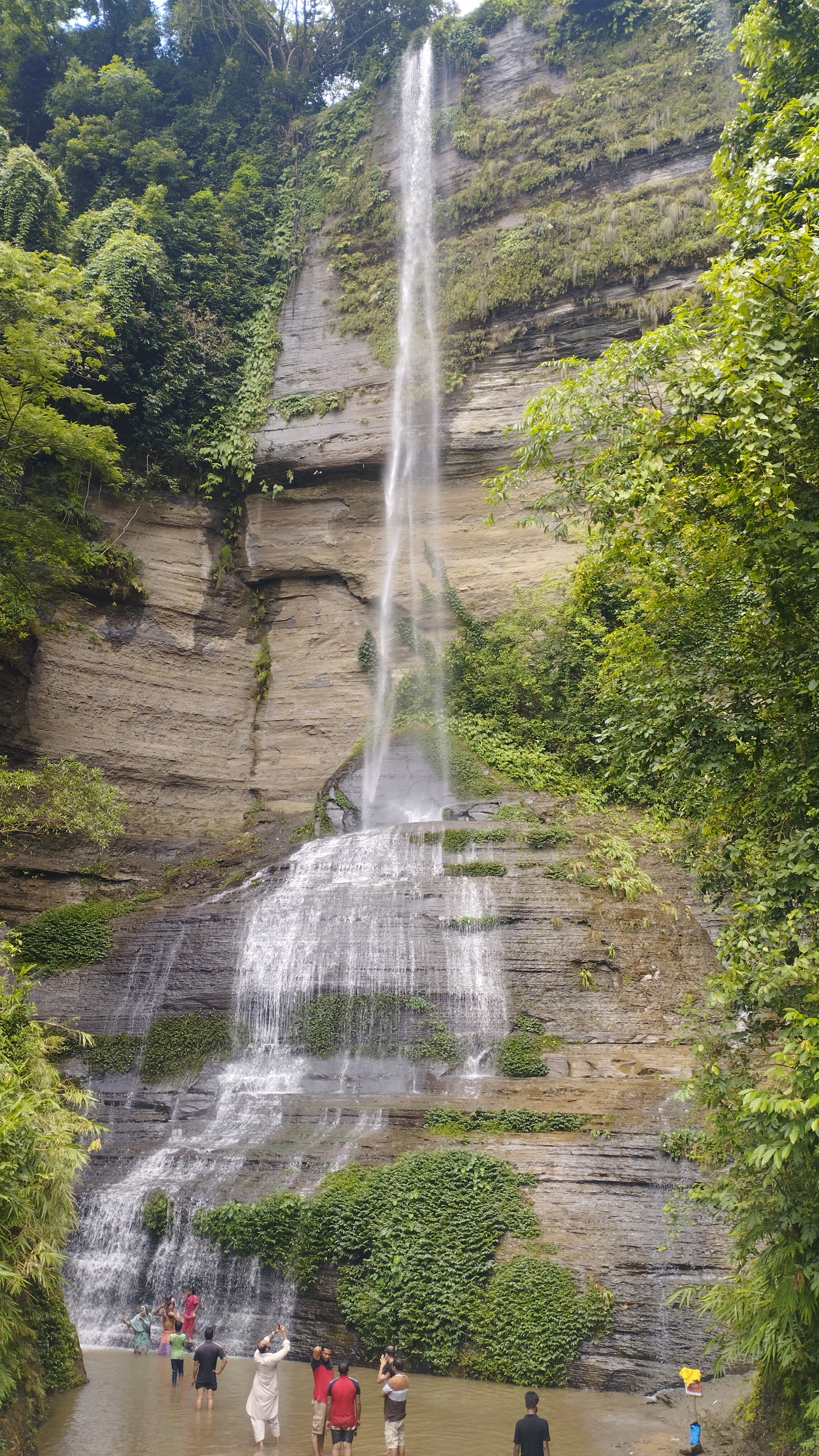

== See also ==
- List of waterfalls in Bangladesh
