= Tinap Saitar Waterfall =

Tinap Saiter
- Location within Bangladesh
- Location: Ruma Upazila, Bandarban
- Coordinates: 22.1667°N 92.3333°E
- Type: waterfall

Tinap Saitar (Bengali: তিনাপ সাইতার) is a waterfall located in the hills of Bandarban District in Bangladesh. It is widely regarded as the largest waterfall in Bangladesh by water flow. The waterfall is also often referred to by another name, Paindu Saitar (or "Paindu Saitara").

The name "Saitar" comes from the local Bawm language in the region which is said to mean "spring" or "fountain".

== Features ==
Tinap Saitar emerges from the water system of a canal (or watercourse) known as Paindu Canal (or Pindu Canal). During monsoon or rainy season, water flow increases significantly, making the waterfall particularly heavy.

The water falls from a height of about 150 feet. It is a popular tourist destination in Bandarban area.

The sunlight in the area can produce rainbows in the mist.

== See also ==
- List of waterfalls in Bangladesh
