= Risang Waterfall =

Waterfall in Bangladesh

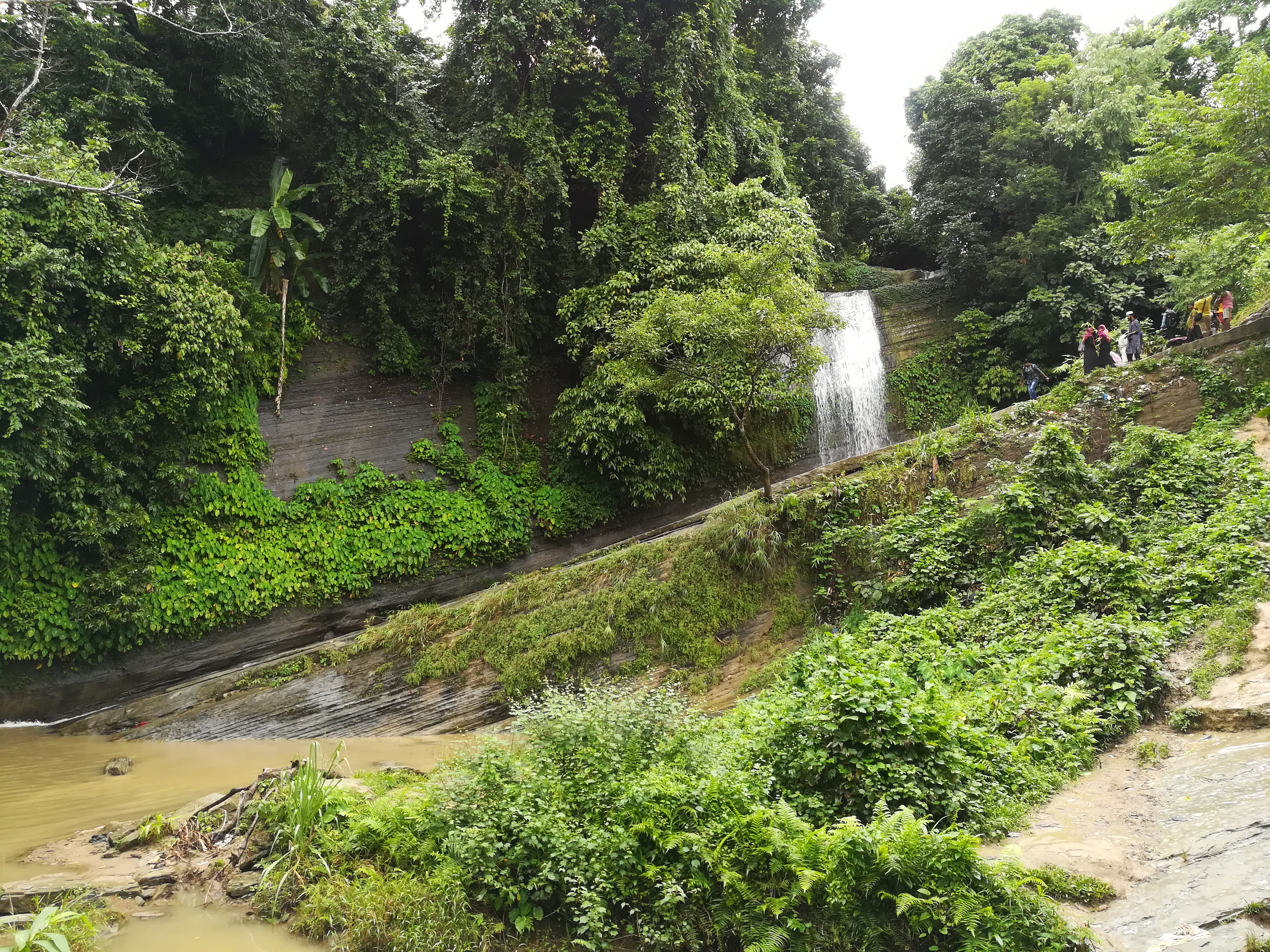
Risang Waterfall

Risang Waterfall (also known as Sapmara Risang Waterfall) is a hill waterfall located in Sapmara village of Matiranga Upazila in Khagrachari District. It is about 10 km away from Khagrachari town. The height of this waterfall is about 100 feet.

== Etymology ==
The word 'Risang' comes from the language of the Marma community of Khagrachari. In Marma, 'Ring' means water and 'Chang' refers to something rolling down from a high place. Therefore, the word 'Risang' means water flowing down from a high place. Another name for it is 'Terang Teikalai'.

== Description ==
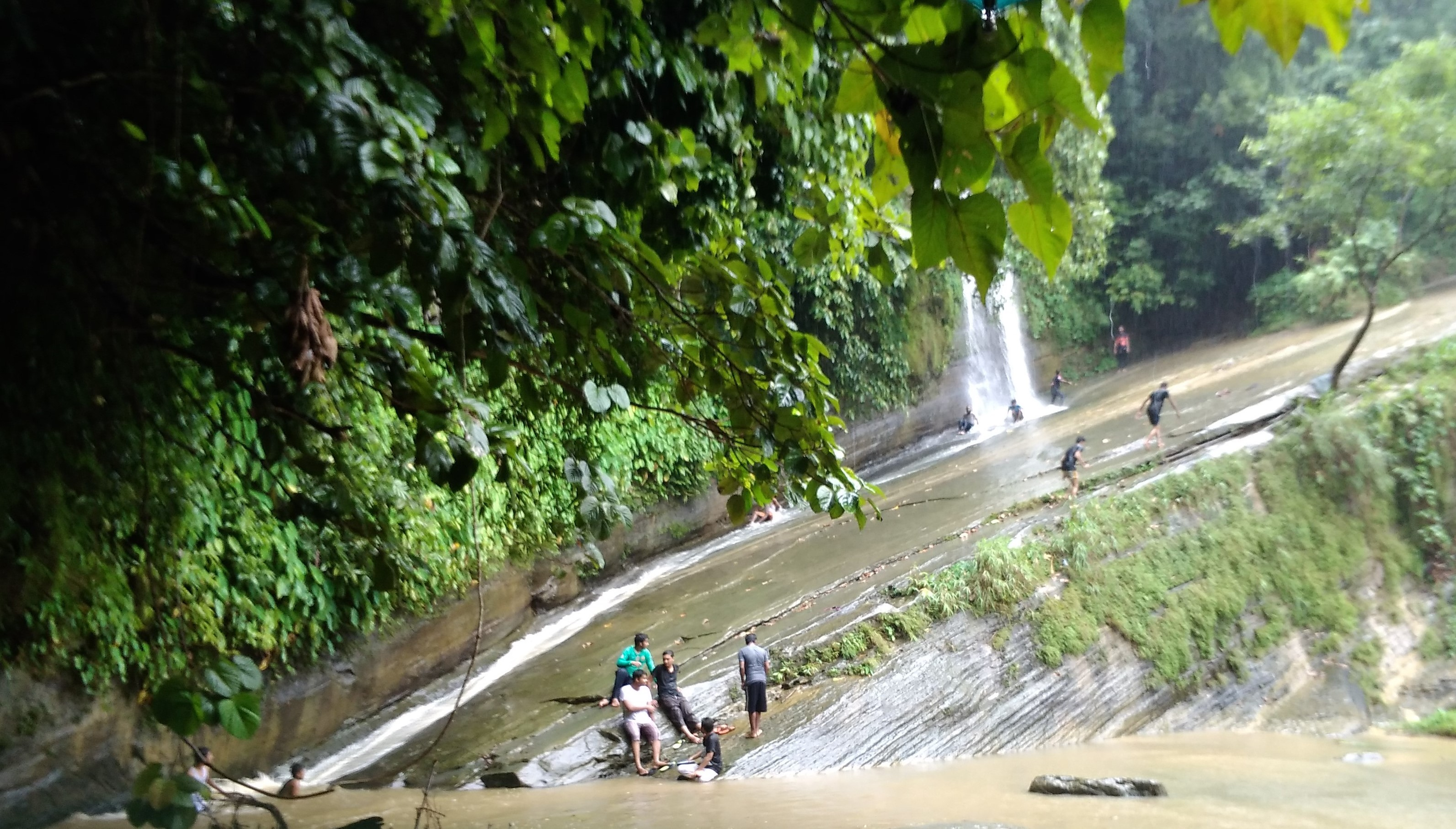
View of Risang Waterfall

Risang Waterfall is located 11 km from Khagrachari District headquarters and about 10 km from Matiranga Upazila headquarters, and another 1 km south from the Khagrachari–Dhaka main road. From the main road, one has to cross a hilly path and descend 235 steps to reach the waterfall. During the rainy season, the sound of the waterfall can be heard while descending the stairs. It is believed that this natural waterfall was discovered around 1993–94; it came into notice because of jhum cultivation.

== Transport ==
From Khagrachari town, tourists can directly reach the traditional Risang Waterfall via car. A new road has been built from the main road to improve the travel experience for visitors. In addition, for development and maintenance purposes, a small entry fee is currently charged from tourists.

== Gallery ==
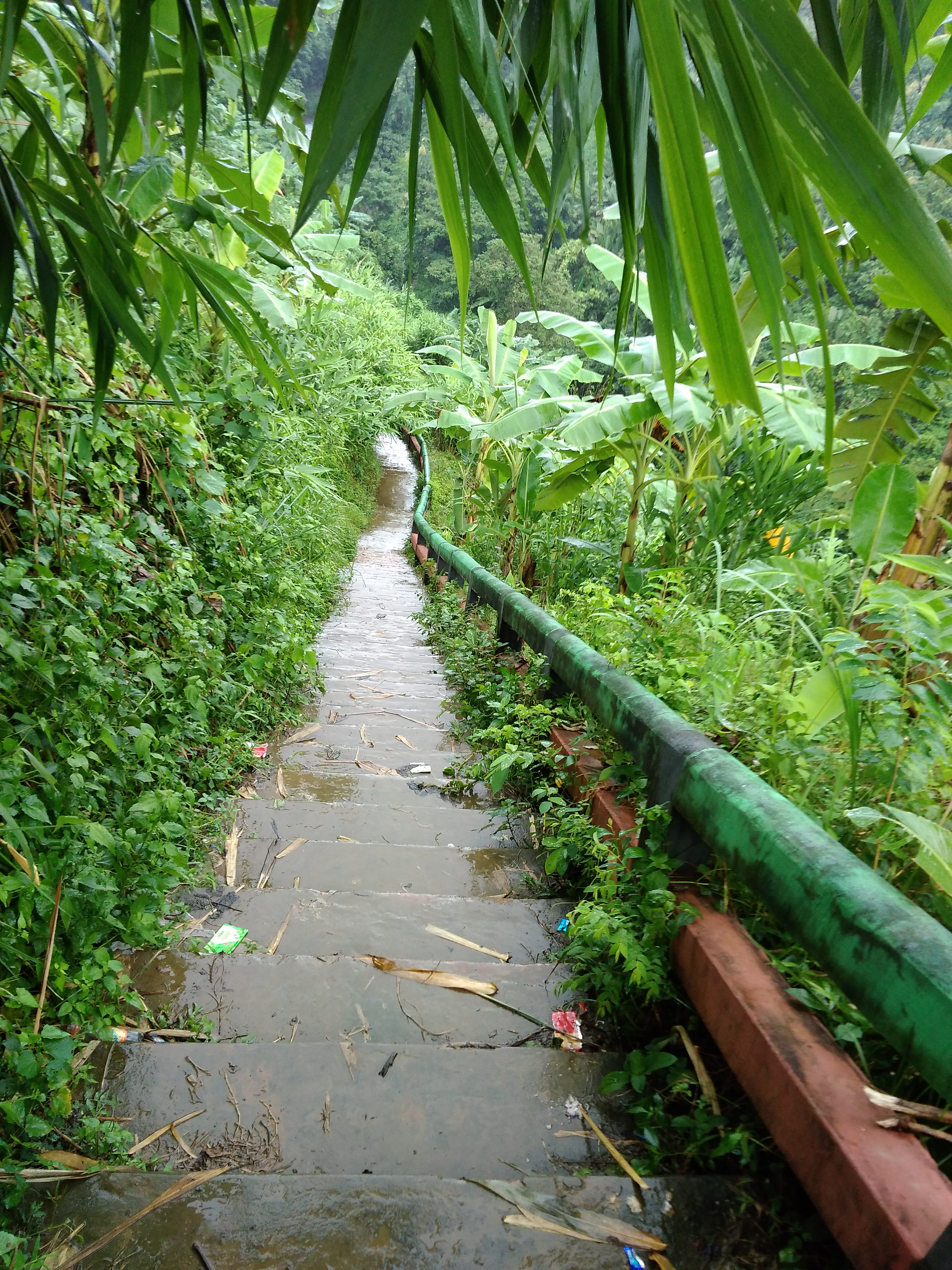
The 235-step stairway on the way to Risang Waterfall

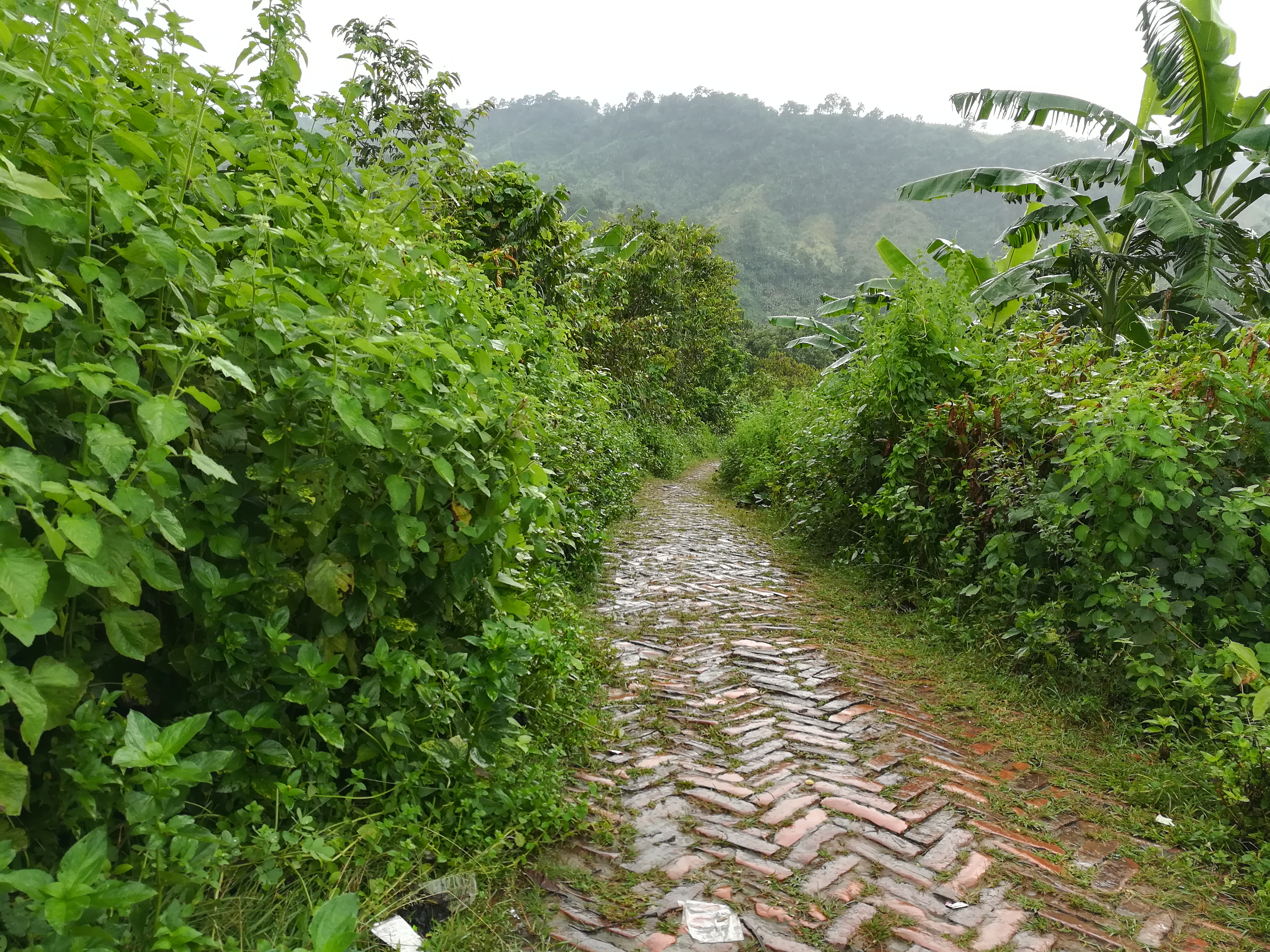
Path to Risang Waterfall

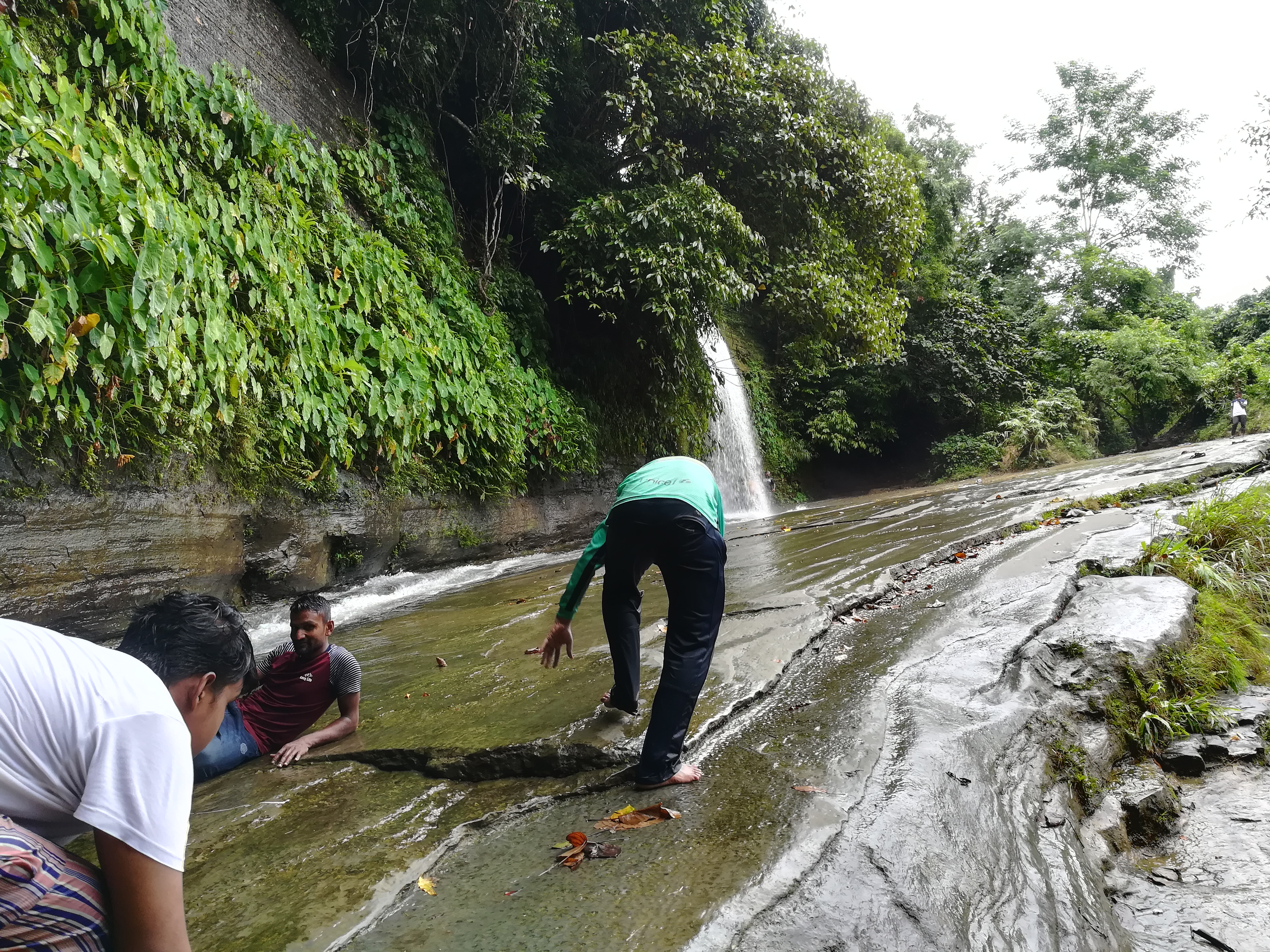
Sloped part of the waterfall after rainfall

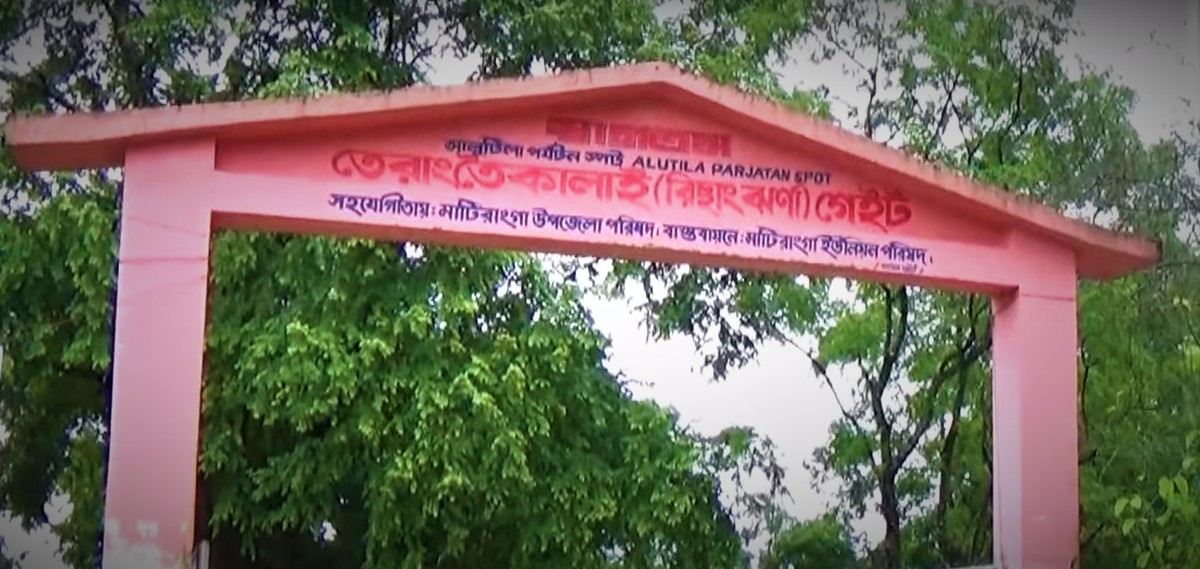
Entrance gate of Risang Waterfall area

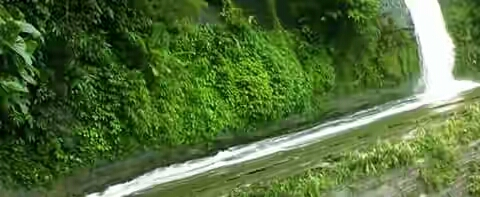
Risang Waterfall

== See also ==
- List of waterfalls in Bangladesh
