= Jhorjhori Waterfall =

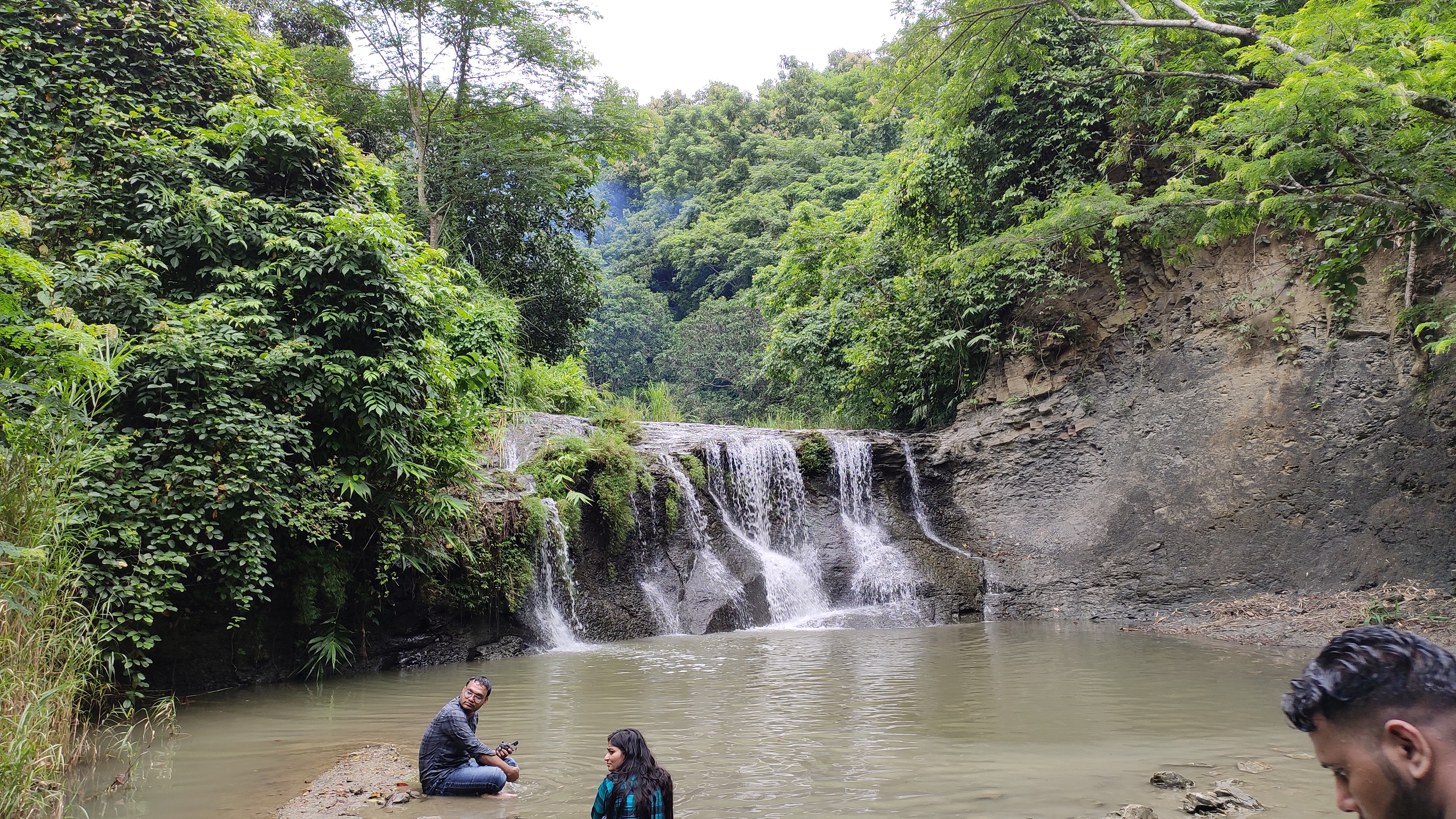
Jhorjhori Waterfall

Jhorjhori Waterfall is a waterfall located in Sitakunda Upazila of Chattogram District. This waterfall is situated near Chandranath Hill.

== Location ==
The waterfall is located in the Panthchhila area, just after Sitakunda Bazar. It takes about two hours on foot from Panthchhila Bazar to reach the waterfall.

== Features ==
Jhorjhori Waterfall is not very large in size. Beside the waterfall, there are several cascades. However, during the rainy season, the pools become quite dangerous. The Shopner Shiri cascade looks like a staircase with deep grooves. The last waterfall on the Jhorjhori trail is called Murti Waterfall.

== Tourism ==
Every day, many travelers visit this waterfall. Local people can be hired as guides. Food can also be ordered for meals after a day-long trip.
