= Aduri Waterfall =

Aduri Jhorna
- Location: Jaintiapur, Sylhet, Bangladesh
- Type: waterfall
- Total height: 10–15 ft (3.0–4.6 m)

Aduri Jhorna (Bengali: আদুরি ঝরনা) is a natural waterfall located in Kharampur, Sreepur, under Jaintiapur Upazila in the Sylhet Division of Bangladesh. Locally known as Aduri, the waterfall is a tourist destination known for its scenery. It is considered an important part of Sylhet's natural landscape and is situated amid hills, rivers, and tea gardens.

== Location ==
The waterfall is located in Kharmapur village of Sripur, Jaintapur Upazila. It can be reached by an approximately five-minute walk from Jaflong Road, which makes the waterfall easily accessible to tourists.

== Attractions ==
Aduri Jhorna is a small waterfall that flows through a hilly region. It is surrounded by green hills, tea gardens, and natural scenery. During the monsoon season, the waterfall's flow increases, which enhances its appearance.

== See also ==
- Bichnakandi
- Lalakhal
