= Ranirbandar =

Ranirbandar রাণীরবন্দর
- Commercial Hub and Market Area
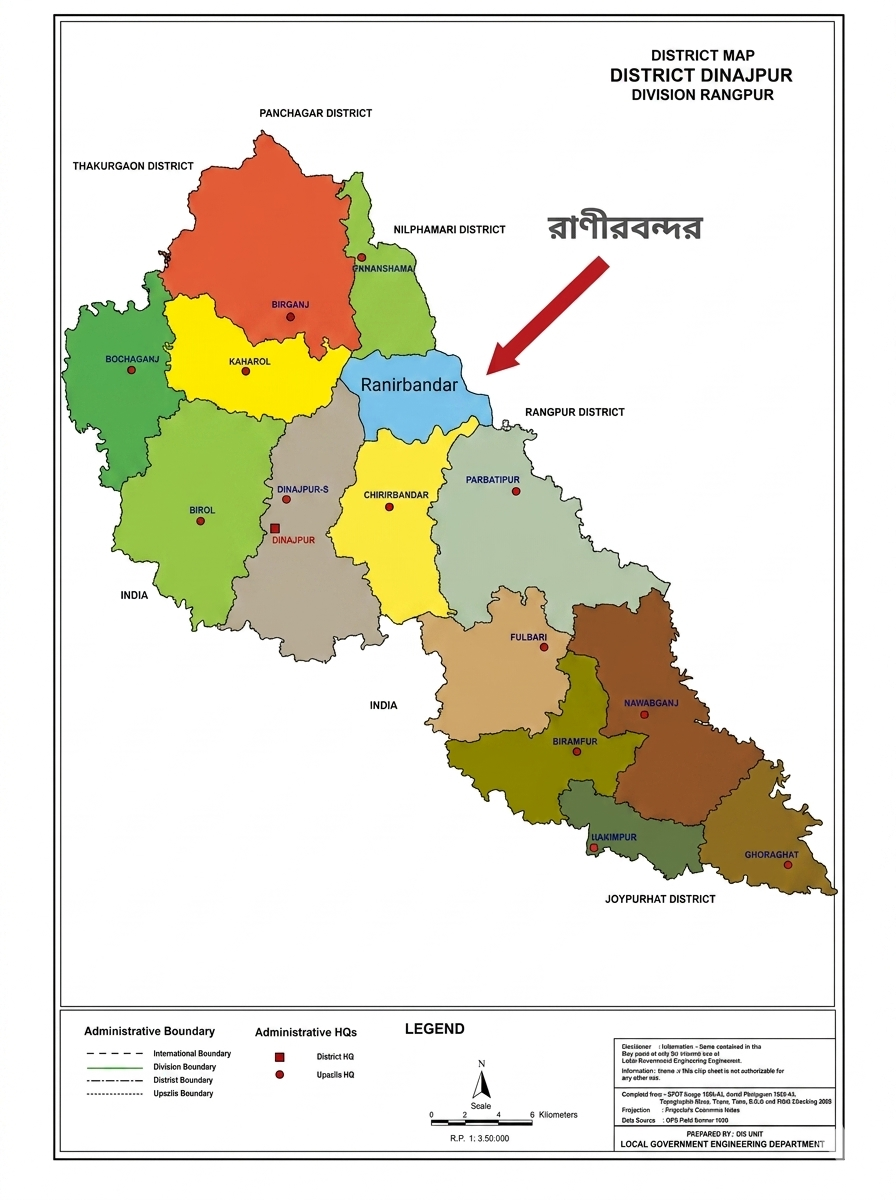
- Country: Bangladesh
- Division: Rangpur Division
- District: Dinajpur District
- Upazila: Parts of Chirirbandar, Khansama, and Parbatipur
- Current Status: Commercial Hub spanning across three upazilas
- Administrative Units: 5 Unions of Chirirbandar, partial areas of 2 Unions of Khansama, and 1 Village of Parbatipur (Total: 7 Unions and 1 Proposed Municipality)
- Constituency: Dinajpur-4
- Time zone: BST (UTC+6)
- Post code: 5241

Ranirbandar is a traditional, renowned, and prominent commercial hub located at the junction of Chirirbandar, Khansama, and Parbatipur upazilas in the Dinajpur District of northern Bangladesh.

== Naming history ==
According to local history and folklore, there are two primary theories regarding the origin of the name "Ranirbandar," both centered around royal history and river-based maritime trade via the Ichamati River (Dinajpur).

In ancient times, large merchant boats operated through the rivers of this region. Legend states that a royal boat (Ranir Naoka) or a fleet belonging to a queen once anchored at the riverbank here. The local name "Ranirbandar" gradually developed centering on this royal arrival and the riverbank port or market ('Bandar').

According to another local historical perspective, a prominent resident named Rani Surmabala contributed significantly to the livelihood, development, and commercial expansion of the local people. To express gratitude for her generosity and cooperation, the local residents named this commercial area "Ranirbandar" after her.

In short, the area gained recognition as "Ranirbandar" from the combination of the words 'Rani' (Queen) and 'Bandar' (Port/Market).

Ranirbandar, located in Chirirbandar Upazila of Dinajpur District, has an official postal code of 5241.

== History and heritage ==
Glorious History of the Liberation War: Ranirbandar has a significant historical role in the Great Liberation War of 1971. The Ranirbandar J.B. High School ground stands as a historical witness, serving as one of the major killing grounds (Badhya Bhumi) and mass graves during the war.

Traditional Cattle Market: The biggest heritage of Ranirbandar is its traditional cattle market (Poshur Hat). It is recognized as one of the largest and most famous livestock markets in North Bengal, where bustling trade takes place throughout the year, especially during the Eid-ul-Adha season.

== Location and area ==
Location:

- East: Saidpur Upazila of Nilphamari District
- West: Dinajpur Sadar Upazila
- North: Khansama Upazila
- South: Chirirbandar Upazila
- North-East (Nishan Kon): Nilphamari Sadar Upazila
- South-East (Agni Kon): Parbatipur Upazila
- North-West (Bayu Kon): Kaharole Upazila

Estimated area: Approximately 127 square kilometers.

== Road transport system ==
The N5 national highway passes through Ranirbandar, serving as a primary transportation route. Additionally, the 'Khansama-Ranirbandar District Road (Z5005)' connects directly to the N5 highway at Ranirbandar, making it an important road junction in the region.

Ranirbandar serves as an important regional transport junction, connected by the 15.42-kilometer long 'Khansama-Ranirbandar District Road (Z5005)' managed by the Roads and Highways Department.

== Demographic data ==
According to the 2022 census, the demographic data of the area is as follows:

- Total population: 1,76,183
- Male population: 88,701 (50.4%)
- Female population: 87,482 (49.6%)
- Population sensity: 1,385.4 people per square kilometer.

== Ranirbandar area (Administrative boundaries) ==
Ranirbandar area encompasses the following administrative units: Five Unions of Chirirbandar Upazila:

- Noshratpur Union
- Tetulia Union
- Satnala Union
- Alokdihi Union
- Fatejangpur Union

Southern parts of two Unions under Khansama Upazila:

- Bhavki Union: 4 Villages (Kumria, Bhavki, Chakaniya, Kachinia, Sabek Gotiya, Dhani Gotiya, Kongaon, Ghorideoba, and Marotiya)
- Goaldihi Union: 2 Villages (Two villages adjacent to Noshratpur and Fatejangpur unions of Chirirbandar upazila)

One Village of Parbatipur Upazila:

- Sonapukur Village under Belaichandi Union

== Education ==
According to the 2022 Population and Housing Census, the overall literacy rate of the Ranirbandar area (spanning across Chirirbandar, Khansama, and Parbatipur upazilas) is 75.88%. Among them, the male literacy rate is 78.88% and the female literacy rate is 72.90%.

=== Educational institutions ===
==== Secondary schools ====
- Sunlight School and College, Ranirbandar
- Alokdihi J.B. High School, Ranirbandar
- Child Care Residential School, Ranirbandar
- Ranirbandar Nazrul Institute (N.I) Girls' High School
- Noshratpur Palli Unnayan Adarsha High School, Ranirbandar
- South Noshratpur High School, Bolai Bazar
- Bhushirbandar High School
- Bhushirbandar Chomir Uddin Sarkar Memorial Girls' High School
- Singganagar High School, Tetulia
- Sukhipir Multi-purpose High School, Satnala
- Satnala Dimukhi High School
- Ghantaghar Adarsha Girls' High School
- Fatejangpur High School
- Hashimpur High School
- Hashimpur Mollapara High School
- Dangarhat High School
- Kachinia Girls' High School
- Kumria B.L. High School
- Sonapukur Suravi High School

==== Colleges ====
- Ichamati Degree College, Ranirbandar
- Ichamati Mohila College, Ranirbandar
- Ranirbandar Mohila College
- Sunlight School and College, Ranirbandar
- Fatejangpur Mahavidyalaya
- Sukhipir Mahavidyalaya, Satnala
- Alokdihi Ideal College

== Markets and bazaars ==
=== Notable markets (Hat-Bazaar) ===
- Ranirbandar Suihari Bazaar
- Ranirbandar Puratan Bazaar
- Ranirbandar Cattle Market (Poshur Hat)
- Kalitola Bazaar
- Bhushirbandar Hat and Bazaar
- Chowrongi Bazaar
- Gofoldih Bazaar
- Taraknath Hat
- Dangarhat
- Ghantaghar Bazaar
- Champatali Bazaar
- Kuihari Hat
- Baro Hashimpur Bazaar
- Kachinia Bazaar
- Fastganj Bazaar
- Sonapukur Rabeya Mor
