= Sunlight School and College =

- সানলাইট স্কুল এন্ড কলেজ

Location
- Rangpur Division; Ranirbandar, Chirirbandar Upazila, Dinajpur 5240; Bangladesh; 25.771942°N 88.795225°E

Information
- Type: Non-government
- Motto: জ্ঞানই শক্তি (Knowledge is Power)
- Established: 1993; 33 years ago
- Founder: SRS Foundation
- School board: Board of Intermediate and Secondary Education, Dinajpur
- Chairman: Md. Humayun Kabir Mannan Shah
- Principal: Md. Anisur Rahman
- Teaching staff: 40+
- Grades: SSC, HSC
- Gender: Male, Female
- Enrollment: 2000+
- EIIN: 134338
- School Code: 1250
- College Code: 7258
- Website: sunlightschool.edu.bd

Sunlight School and College is a private educational institution located in Ranirbandar, Chirirbandar Upazila, Dinajpur District, Rangpur Division, Bangladesh.

It was established in 1993 by the SRS Foundation and is one of the leading private educational institutions in North Bengal.

The institution is maintaining the quality of education by regularly conducting its educational programs and recruiting teachers and staff.
