= Aokora Mosque =

Mosque in Dinajpur, Bangladesh

Aokora Mosjid
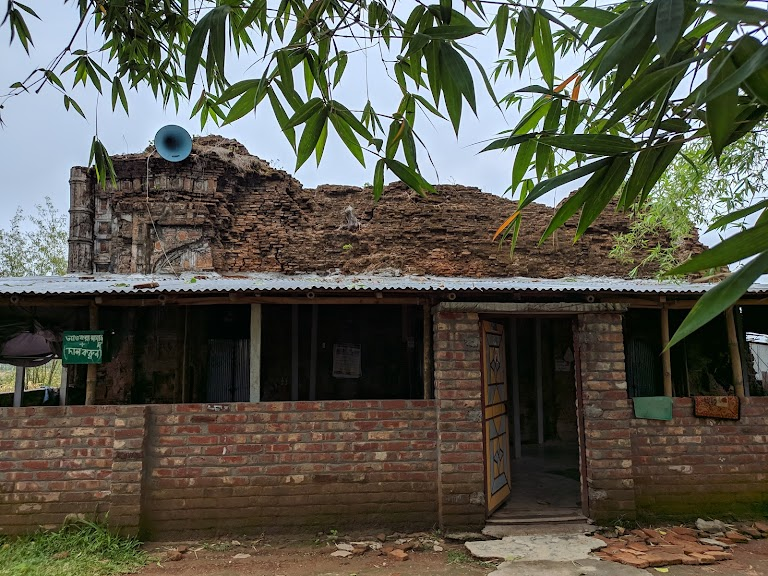

- Location of the mosque in Bangladesh

Religion
- Affiliation: Islam
- Ecclesiastical or organizational status: Mosque
- Status: Active

Location
- Location: Khansama Upazila, Dinajpur, Rangpur Division
- Country: Bangladesh
- Interactive map of Aokora Mosjid
- Coordinates: 25°50′39″N 88°47′06″E

Architecture
- Type: Mosque architecture
- Founder: Mir Zalal Beg
- Completed: 1766

The Aokora Mosque (Bengali: আওকরা মসজিদ) is an ancient mosque located in Khansama Upazila, in Dinajpur, in the Rangpur Division of Bangladesh. The mosque was established in 1766 by Mirza Lal Beg. The mosque is situated on the border of Pakerhat village of Angarpara union of the upazila on the banks of Belan River, flowing in Bukchir of Hasimpur area at a place called Mirza Mat.

== Overview ==
The mosque's exact origins are unknown. Its current name stems from a historical feature of the mosque, as the mosque's architecture would create an echo, hence Aokora meaning "to speak", or "the talking mosque". Local legend holds that this was the mosque answering people's prayers. However, due to structural decay, the building no longer produces these echoes.

There is a legend that once there was a Muslim settlement around the mosque. Mirza Lal Beg built the mosque in 1766 thinking of the devout Muslims. At that time religious rituals were performed here along with prayers. Its architectural style is interior contemporary craftsmanship.

== See also ==
- Islam in Bangladesh
- List of mosques in Bangladesh
