= Kayempur =

Kayempur village
- Village
- Interactive map of Kayempur village
- Coordinates: 25.8381°N 88.7652°E
- Country: Bangladesh
- Division: Rangpur
- District: Dinajpur

Government
  - Type: Union Chairman
  - Body: Union Chairman

Population (2011)
  - Total: 5,500

Languages
  - Official: Bangla, English, Dinajpuri
- Time zone: UTC+6 (IST)
- PIN: 5230

Kayempur (Bengali: কায়েমপুর গ্রাম) is a village located in Khamarpara union, Khansama Upazila, Dinajpur District in the division of Rangpur, Bangladesh.

== Demographics ==
The population is about 5500.

== Urbanization ==
About 50% of the population in village does not have mains electricity supply. There is a post office named 'Kayempur Post Office' with a post code of 5230.

Van, Bicycle, Motorcycle are the main forms of transportation used within the village.

== Education system ==
There are government primary schools (e.g. Kayempur Government primary School), a high school (Kayempur High School), an Eptedai Madrsha (Kayempur Eptedai Madrsha), a Dakhil Madrsha (Kayempur Dakhil Madrsha) and also an NGO school in Kayempur. Literacy rates have been increasing with time (Total: 76.8%, male: 81.3%, female: 72.2%). The school drop-out rate is near zero.

== Water system ==
Tube well water is used.

== See also ==
- Khansama
- Dinajpur
