= Kayempur High School =

Location
- 1, Khansama; Dinajpur; Bangladesh

Information
- Type: Public school
- Established: 1964
- Grades: 1-12
- Campus: Nearly 3 acres
- Accreditation: Board of Intermediate and Secondary Education, Dinajpur
- Yearbook: Kayempur Probaho

Kayempur High School (Bengali: কায়েমপুর উচ্চ বিদ্যালয়) is a school in Kayempur village, Khansama Upazila, Dinajpur, Bangladesh.

== History ==
Kayempur High School was established in 1964.
