= Biral Upazila =

Biral Upazila বিরল উপজেলা
- Upazila of Bangladesh
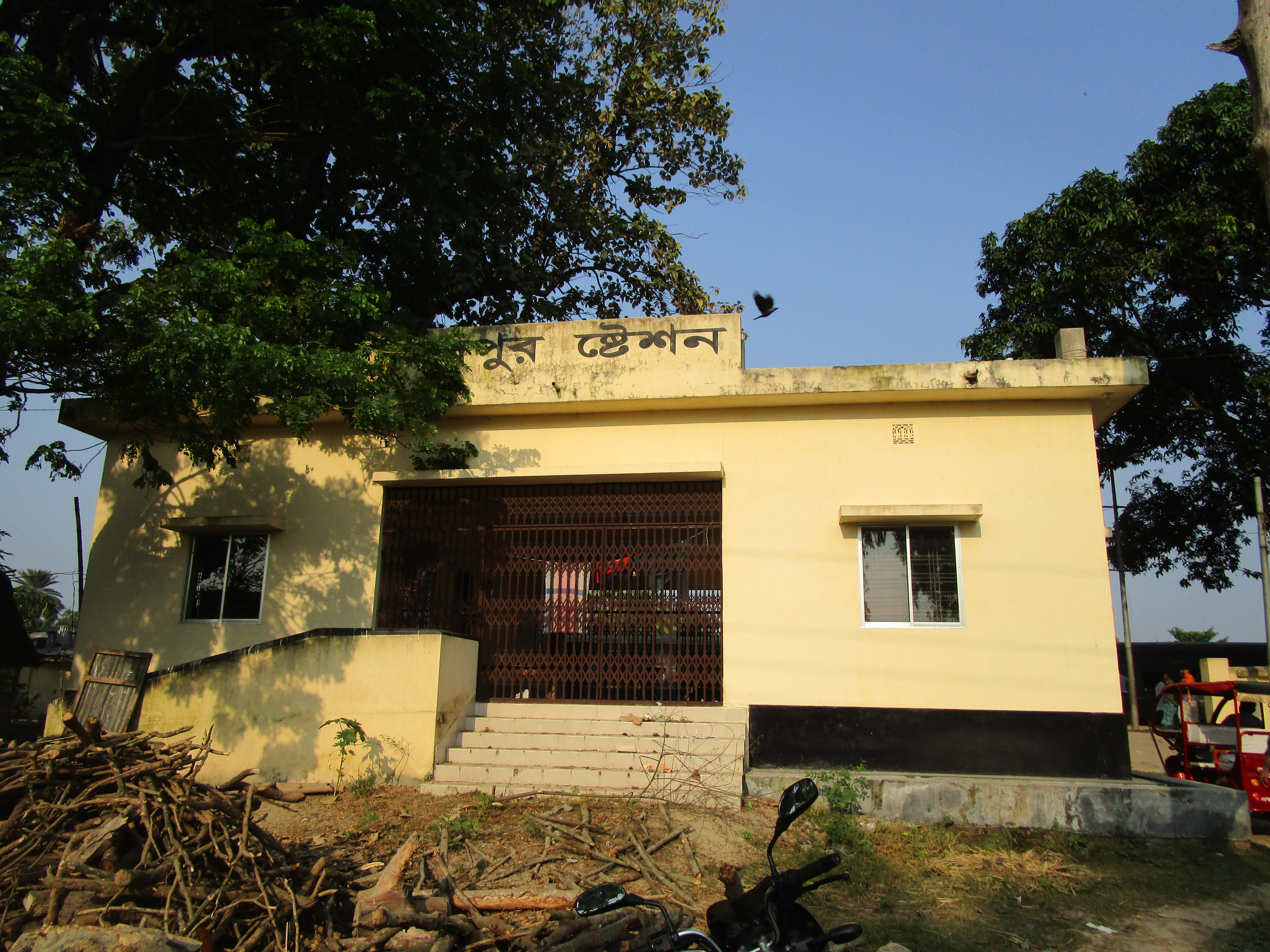
- Mangolpur Railway Station, an important transport hub in Biral Upazila

- Coordinates: 25°38′N 88°32′E
- Country: Bangladesh
- Division: Rangpur
- District: Dinajpur

Government
  - UNO: Bahni Shikha Asha

Area
  - Total: 353.98 km^{2} (136.67 sq mi)

Population (2022)
  - Total: 281,554
  - Density: 795.40/km^{2} (2,060.1/sq mi)
- Time zone: UTC+6 (BST)
- Postal code: 5210
- Website: Official Map of Biral

Biral Upazila mauza geocode map

Biral Upazila (Bengali: বিরল উপজেলা [bi.ɾol u.pɔ.dʒe.la]) is an upazila of Dinajpur District in the Division of Rangpur, Bangladesh.

== History ==
Biral Thana was formed in 1915 during the British colonial period. It was upgraded to an upazila (sub‑district) in 1984 as part of the government’s decentralisation programme.

During the Bangladesh Liberation War of 1971, Biral was the site of several skirmishes between freedom fighters and the Pakistani army.

== Geography ==
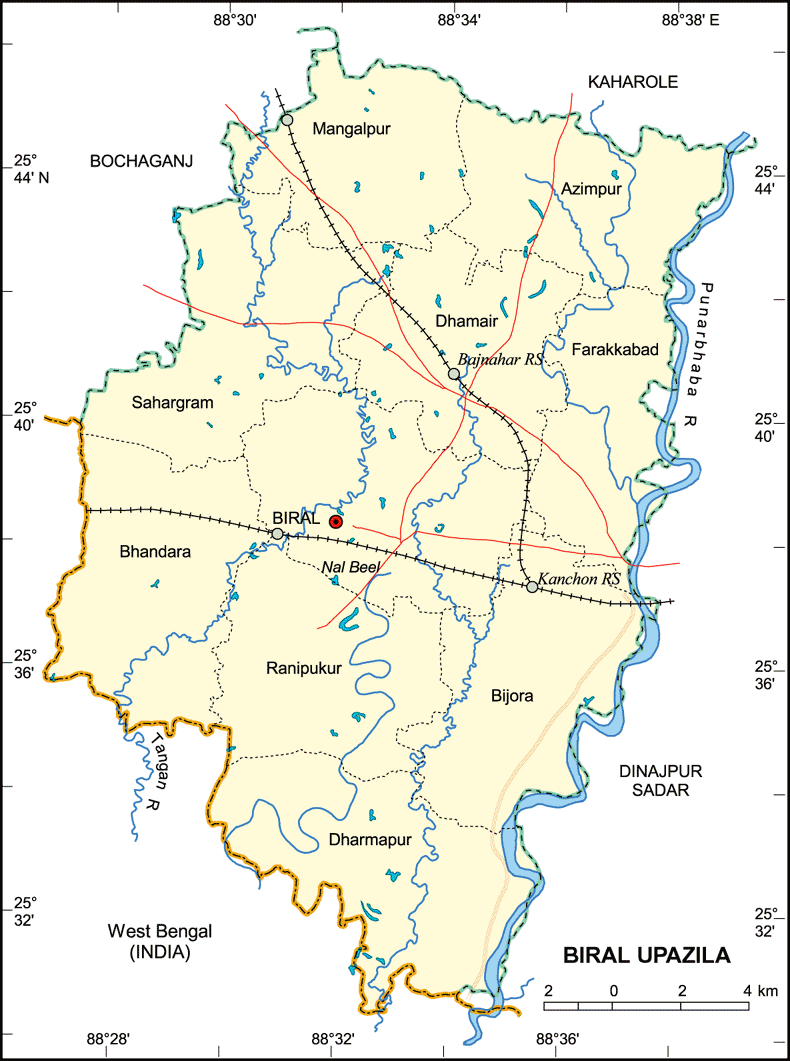
Biral Upazila Map

Biral Upazila is located at 25.6333°N 88.5333°E. It spans a total area of 353.98 km^{2}.

Biral Upazila is bounded by Bochaganj and Kaharole Upazilas on the north, Dinajpur Sadar Upazila and Punarbhaba River on the east, Dinajpur Sadar Upazila and Gangarampur and Kushmandi CD Blocks in Dakshin Dinajpur district, West Bengal, India, on the south, and Bochaganj Upazila, Kaliaganj CD Block in Uttar Dinajpur district in West Bengal, India and Kushmandi on the west.

== Demographics ==
According to the 2022 Bangladeshi census, Biral Upazila had 69,194 households and a population of 281,554. 8.88% of the population were under 5 years of age. Biral had a literacy rate (age 7 and over) of 75.65%: 78.52% for males and 72.77% for females, and a sex ratio of 100.96 males for every 100 females. 23,280 (8.27%) lived in urban areas.

According to the 2011 Census of Bangladesh, Biral Upazila had 61,414 households and a population of 257,925. 59,186 (22.95%) were under 10 years of age. Biral had a literacy rate (age 7 and over) of 47.33%, compared to the national average of 51.8%, and a sex ratio of 982 females per 1000 males. 9,059 (3.51%) lived in urban areas. Ethnic population was 4,178 (1.62%), of which Santal were 3,257.

As of the 1991 Bangladesh census, Biral has a population of 204,420. Males constitute 52.57% of the population, and females 47.43%. This Upazila's population above 18 years is 101819. Biral has an average literacy rate of 27.9% (7+ years), and the national average of 32.4%.

=== Ethnicity and religion ===
Religions in Biral Upazila (2022)
Religion	Percent
Islam	73.89%
Hinduism	25.20%
Other or not stated	0.91%

Population by religion in Union/Paurashava (2022)
Union/Paurashava	Muslim	Hindu	Others
Biral Paurashava	12,216	1,602	33
Azimpur Union	10,459	4,196	188
Bhandara Union	17,544	6,729	135
Bijora Union	20,312	2,203	159
Biral Union	21,343	3,318	2
Dhamair Union	14,294	7,992	153
Dharmapur Union	17,971	9,240	353
Farakkabad Union	20,046	1,068	33
Mangalpur Union	9,957	10,094	12
Palashbari Union	15,605	707	234
Rajarampur Union	8,712	8,997	602
Ranipukur Union	18,904	8,161	580
Sahargram Union	20,687	6,635	69

Muslim majority
Hindu majority

Biral is a Muslim-majority upazila with two Hindu-majority unions. Ethnic population is 3123 (1.11%) of which Santal are 2428.

== Administration ==
Biral Thana was formed in 1915 and it was turned into an upazila in 1984.

Biral Upazila is divided into Biral Municipality (Paurashava) and 12 union parishads: Azimpur, Bhandara, Bijora, Biral, Dhamair, Dharmapur, Farakkabad, Mangalpur, Palashbari, Rajarampur, Ranipukur, and Shohorgram. The union parishads are subdivided into 241 mauzas and 238 villages.

== See also ==
- Upazilas of Bangladesh
- Districts of Bangladesh
- Divisions of Bangladesh
- Dinajpur District, Bangladesh
- Biral railway station
