= Lucas Marandi =

Personal life
- Born: 4 August 1922
- Died: 21 April 1971 (aged 48)

Religious life
- Religion: Christianity

Lucas Marandi (4 August 1922 – 21 April 1971) was a Bangladeshi Christian priest. He is considered a martyr in Bangladesh. He was the first native bishop of Dinajpur region.

== Biography ==
Marandi was born on 4 April 1922 at Beneedwar in a Santali Dinajpur to Mathius Marandi and Maria Kisku. He was converted to the Christianity as per rule of theology after nine days of his birth.

Marandi received his primary education from Beniduar Mission Primary School. He was admitted into Dinajpur Santal Middle School (now St. Philip's Boarding School) in 1934. Later, he was sent to Italy to study divine perfection and attributes. After completing studies from there he came back to his country.

Marandi was appointed as a bishop at the cathedral of Dinajpur on 1 December 1955. He also worked as a religious teacher and was appointed as the leader of his community. At first he was sent to work in Mariampur Mission in Ghoraghat of Dinajpur. Later, he was sent to work at St. Philip's Boarding.

Marandi took interim responsibility of Dinajpur religion state in 1965 but due to the Indo-Pak War he faced some difficulties in conducting missionary work in that place. He was then appointed a temporary bishop at Ruhea in Thakurgaon.

Besides missionary work Marandi worked to build up leadership to develop agriculture. He introduced a boarding school at Ruhea in Thakurgaon.

After the beginning of the Liberation War of Bangladesh the refugees took shelter at Ruhea Missionary. Marandi provided food and shelter of these people. He motivated the young people to join the Liberation War of Bangladesh. He also provided treatment and medicine to the injured freedom fighters secretly.

On 12 April 1971 Marandi crossed the border and went to India to collect medicine for the freedom fighters. After returning he saw that the people of Ruhea began to move to the refugee camps of India. In the meantime he was told to leave Ruhea Mission. Then he decided to leave his country with the people of his missionary. Though he crossed the border, he returned to Ruhea later.

On 21 April 1971 an army jeep appeared in front of the Mission and four soldiers got down from the jeep. Marandi welcomed them and offered them tea and biscuits. They had a suspicion that freedom fighters might be given shelter in the mission. They searched and found nothing. Then they left the mission.

The jeep came back again after three hours. They took Marandi out of the mission. He was killed by them by bayonet charge. His dead body was taken to the Catholic Church at Islampur in India and he was buried there.

A memorial monument was built at Ruhea Mission to memorise him. A football competition is held every year at Beniduar Mission on 21 April in memory of him. A road on the southern quarters of Dinajpur is named after Marandi.
