= Dinajpur Government Girls' High School =

Location
- Dinajpur Sadar Upazila; Bangladesh; 25°37′59″N 88°38′13″E

Information
- Established: 1869
- Faculty: 50
- Gender: Girls
- Enrollment: 1,300

Dinajpur Government Girls' High School is a school for girls in Dinajpur Sadar Upazila in Bangladesh. It was established in 1869.

The school was nationalized on 1 April 1961.

About 1,300 students are enrolled. There are about 50 teachers in the school.

DGGHS has 3 buildings, constructed in 1960, 1980, and 2000, respectively, with a total area of 13,300 square feet.

== Alumni ==
- Khaleda Zia, former prime minister, matriculated from Dinajpur Girls High School in 1960.
