= Bochaganj Upazila =

Bochaganj বোচাগঞ্জ
- Upazila
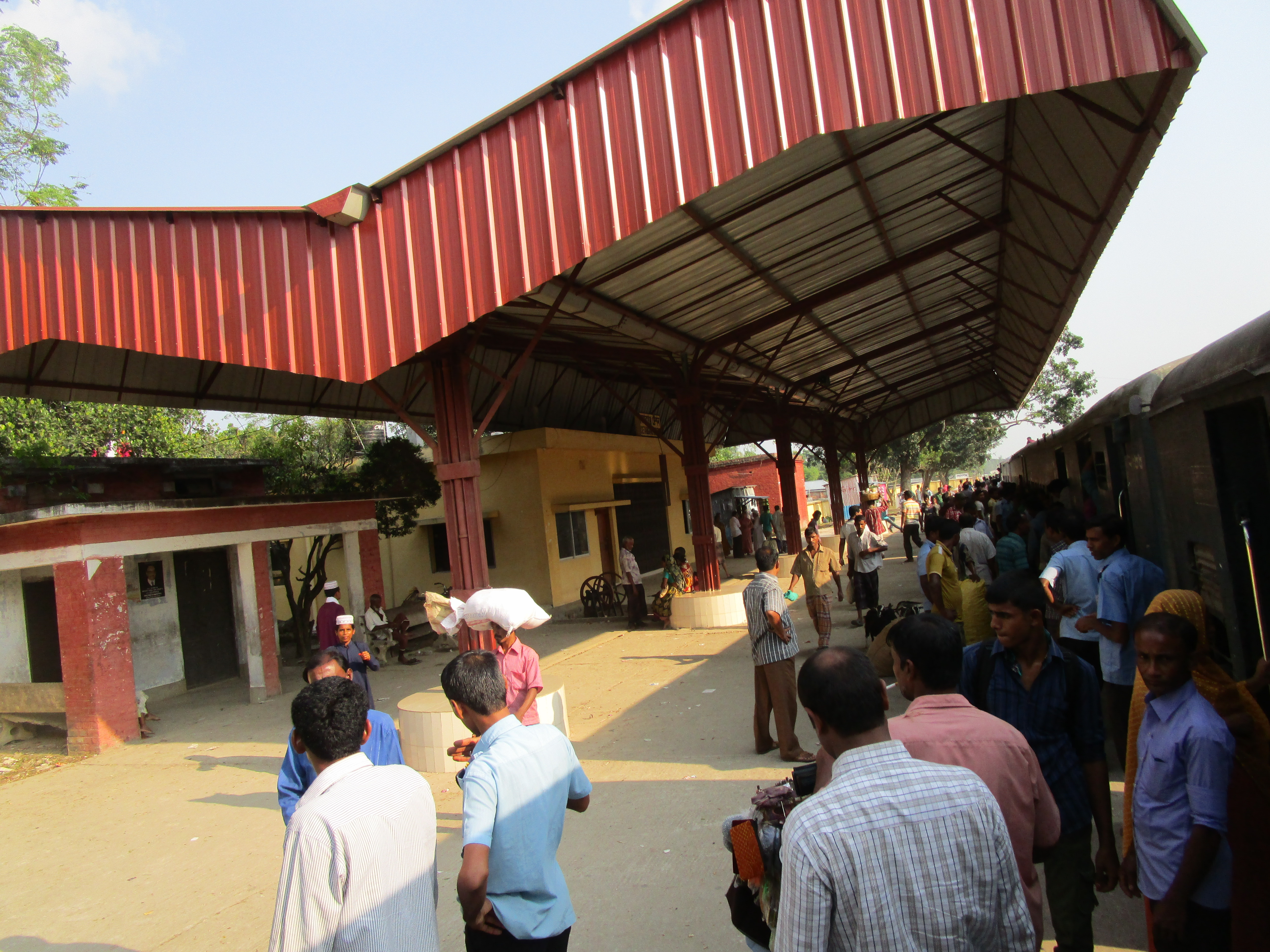
- Setabganj Railway Station

- Coordinates: 25°48′N 88°27.7′E
- Country: Bangladesh
- Division: Rangpur
- District: Dinajpur
- Headquarters: Setabganj

Area
  - Total: 224.79 km^{2} (86.79 sq mi)

Population (2022)
  - Total: 171,718
  - Density: 763.90/km^{2} (1,978.5/sq mi)
- Time zone: UTC+6 (BST)
- Postal code: 5216
- Website: Official Map of Bochaganj

Bochaganj Upazila mauza geocode map

Bochaganj (Bengali: বোচাগঞ্জ) is an upazila of Dinajpur District in the division of Rangpur, Bangladesh. Setabganj town is the headquarter of Bochaganj Upazila unlike many other Upazila and district of Bangladesh. Setabganj town is the closest in location to district headquarters among other upazila headquarters of Dinajpur.

Bochaganj Upazila consists of large agricultural lands which produce different crops, high-quality rice, cooking ingredients, cane, and crafts. Historical weekly rural shopping zone which is also called Hat in this area is popular by the people of the districts.

== Geography ==
Bochaganj is located at 25.8000°N 88.4611°E. It has a total area of 224.81 km^{2}.

Bochaganj Upazila is bounded by Birganj Upazila in Dinajpur District and Pirganj Upazila in Rangpur district on the north, Birganj, Kaharole and Biral Upazilas on the east, Biral Upazila and Kaliaganj CD Block in Uttar Dinajpur district, West Bengal, India, on the south, and Pirganj Upazila on the west.

== Demographics ==
According to the 2022 Bangladeshi census, Bochaganj Upazila had 43,405 households and a population of 171,718. 8.70% of the population were under 5 years of age. Bochaganj had a literacy rate (age 7 and over) of 76.19%: 80.84% for males and 71.67% for females, and a sex ratio of 98.31 males for every 100 females. 32,058 (18.67%) lived in urban areas.

According to the 2011 Census of Bangladesh, Bochaganj Upazila had 39,246 households and a population of 160,049. 34,664 (21.66%) were under 10 years of age. Bochaganj had a literacy rate (age 7 and over) of 52.56%, compared to the national average of 51.8%, and a sex ratio of 990 females per 1000 males. 27,335 (17.08%) lived in urban areas. Ethnic population was 3,115 (1.95%), of which Santal were 2,322.

As of the 1991 Bangladesh census, Bochaganj has a population of 135376. Males constitute 51.7% of the population, and females 48.3%. Upazila's population, older than 18, is 64312. Bochaganj has an average literacy rate of 30.2% (7+ years), and the national average of 32.4% literate.

=== Ethnicity and religion ===
Religions in Bochaganj Upazila (2022)
Religion	Percent
Islam	60.18%
Hinduism	38.07%
Christianity	1.43%
Other or not stated	0.32%

Population by religion in Union/Paurashava
Union/Paurashava	Muslim	Hindu	Others
Setabganj Paurashava	23,629	5,668	170
Atgaon Union	15,201	10,119	27
Chhatail Union	15,487	7,774	47
Ishania Union	10,036	15,595	56
Mushidhat Union	10,065	9,480	7
Nafanagar Union	15,560	8,662	384
Ranagaon Union	13,364	8,083	2,031

🟩 Muslim majority 🟧 Hindu majority

Population of upazila by ethnicity (2022)
1. Bengali (98.2%)
2. Santal (1.17%)
3. Others (0.60%)

Bengali Muslims are the majority while Bengali Hindus are a large minority, and make up a majority in one union. Ethnic population is 3042 (1.77%), of which Santals are 2002.

== Administration ==
UNO: Md. Maruf Hasan.

Previously known as Bochaganj thana, formed in 1915, was turned into an upazila in 1984.

Bochaganj Upazila is divided into Setabganj Municipality and six union parishads namely: Atgaon, Eshania, Murshidhat, Nafanagar, Rongaon, and Shatail. The union parishads are subdivided into 144 mauzas and 141 villages.

Setabganj Municipality is subdivided into 9 wards and 33 mahallas.

== See also ==
- Upazilas of Bangladesh
- Districts of Bangladesh
- Divisions of Bangladesh
- Dinajpur District, Bangladesh
