= Dinajpur Sadar Upazila =

Dinajpur Sadar দিনাজপুর সদর
- Upazila
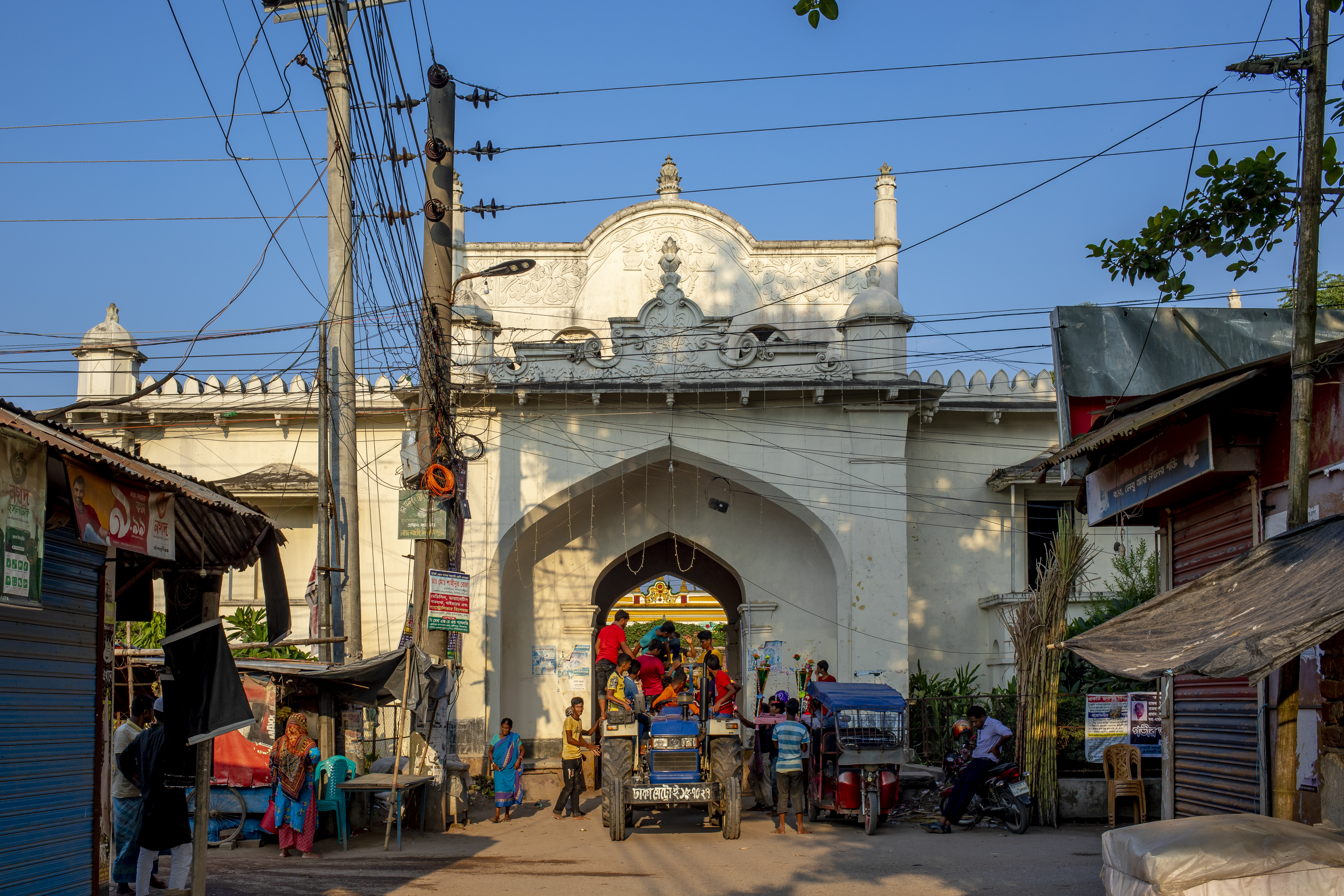
- Main entrance to Dinajpur Rajbari in Dinajpur

- Coordinates: 25°38′N 88°39′E
- Country: Bangladesh
- Division: Rangpur
- District: Dinajpur
- Headquarters: Dinajpur

Area
  - Total: 354.73 km^{2} (136.96 sq mi)
- Elevation: 37 m (121 ft)

Population (2022)
  - Total: 549,184
  - Density: 1,548.2/km^{2} (4,009.8/sq mi)
- Time zone: UTC+6 (BST)
- Postal code: 5200
- Area code: 0531
- Website: dinajpursadar.dinajpur.gov.bd

Dinajpur Sadar Upazila mauza geocode map

Dinajpur Sadar (Bengali: দিনাজপুর সদর) is an upazila of Dinajpur District in the Division of Rangpur, Bangladesh.

== Geography ==
Dinajpur Sadar is located at 25.6333°N 88.6500°E. It has a total area of 354.73 km^{2}.

Dinajpur Sadar Upazila is bounded by Kaharole and Khansama Upazilas on the north, Chirirbandar Upazila on the east, Kumarganj and Gangarampur CD Blocks in Dakshin Dinajpur district, West Bengal, India, on the south, and Biral Upazila on the west.

== Demographics ==
Religions in Dinajpur Sadar Upazila (2022)
| Religion | Percent |
| Islam | 82.90% |
| Hinduism | 15.82% |
| Christianity | 1.01% |
| Other or not stated | 0.27% |

According to the 2022 Bangladeshi census, Dinajpur Sadar Upazila had 135,479 households and a population of 549,184. 8.26% of the population were under 5 years of age. Dinajpur Sadar had a literacy rate (age 7 and over) of 82.78%: 84.96% for males and 80.55% for females, and a sex ratio of 102.96 males for every 100 females. 233,347 (42.49%) lived in urban areas. Ethnic population is 5891 (1.07%) of which 4442 were Santal.

According to the 2011 Census of Bangladesh, Dinajpur Sadar Upazila had 111,779 households and a population of 484,597. 94,188 (19.44%) were under 10 years of age. Dinajpur Sadar had a literacy rate (age 7 and over) of 64.26%, compared to the national average of 51.8%, and a sex ratio of 956 females per 1000 males. 191,329 (39.48%) lived in urban areas. Ethnic population was 6,607 (1.36%), of which Santal were 4,191, Oraon 828 and Barman 641.

As of the 1991 Bangladesh census, Dinajpur Sadar has a population of 357,888. Males constitute 52.08% of the population, and females 47.92%. This Upazila's eighteen up population is 187,016. Dinajpur Sadar has an average literacy rate of 41.1% (7+ years), and the national average of 32.4% literate.

== Administration ==
UNO: Faysal Rayhan.

Dinajpur Sadar Upazila is divided into Dinajpur Municipality and ten union parishads: Askorpur, Auliapur, Chealgazi, Fazilpur, Kamalpur, Sankarpur, Shashora, Shekpura, Sundorbon, and Uthrail. The union parishads are subdivided into 211 mauzas and 207 villages.

Dinajpur Municipality is subdivided into 12 wards and 80 mahallas.

Member of Parliament: currently not functioned.

== Education ==
According to Banglapedia, Dinajpur Government Girls' High School, founded in 1869, is a notable secondary school. Dinajpur Zilla School was established in 1854 during the British reign. It is located at the center of the Dinajpur town.

There is also a textile college in the district.

== See also ==
- Upazilas of Bangladesh
- Districts of Bangladesh
- Divisions of Bangladesh
- Dinajpur District, Bangladesh
