= Dinajpur Zilla School =

Public high school in Dinajpur, Bangladesh

- দিনাজপুর জিলা স্কুল

Location
- Municipality office road Dinajpur; Bangladesh; 25.6245°N 88.6368°E

Information
- School type: Government funded Secondary School
- Motto: জ্ঞানই শক্তি (Knowledge is Power)
- Established: 1854
- Session: January–December
- Principal: Afroza Begum
- Teaching staff: 52
- Grades: 3-10
- Gender: Male only
- Age: 08 to 17
- Enrollment: 2000 (Approx.)
- Language: Bengali
- Campus: Dinajpur
- Sports: Football, cricket, basketball, volleyball, badminton
- Website: dinajpurzillaschool.edu.bd

Dinajpur Zilla School is a public high school in Dinajpur District, Bangladesh. About 2000 students study here from classes 3 to 10. The school's current Headmaster is Mrs. Afroza Begum and Assistant Headmaster is Sir Aminul Islam (morning shift). It is one of the ancient schools in Bangladesh.

== History ==
Dinajpur Zilla School was established in 1854 in the Pratap House by the Raja Tarakanath. In 1856 the government nationalised the school and converted it into the Zilla (district) school. Despite the nationalization, the school was still financially supported by the king and other local influentials in the 19th century. It has one of best graduation rates in Bangladesh. The current school building was built in the 20th century and upgraded in the 21st century. The main office and library is in a building that was a revenue office built in the 18th century by king Baiyanath. The student hostel was built in 1910 and is still there.

== Admission ==
The admission for the school mainly starts from class 3. The school gives one year for preparation of the examination. As example, in those students who read in class 2, take preparation for the admission exam which is held usually in the last week of December. After the exam 240 students are chosen from thousands of examinees. They study in class 3 in the next year. There are also some sessions when admission is open for class 6.

== Notable alumni ==
- Narayan Gangopadhyay, Bengali writer and professor of University of Calcutta
- General Shafiul Haque, Chief of Army Staff of Bangladesh Army
- Moinuddin Ahmed Chowdhury, politician, social reformer and member of the Ghugudanga Zamindar family
- Rampran Gupta, historian, author and leader of Brahma Samaj
