= Kaharole Upazila =

Kaharole কাহারোল
- Upazila
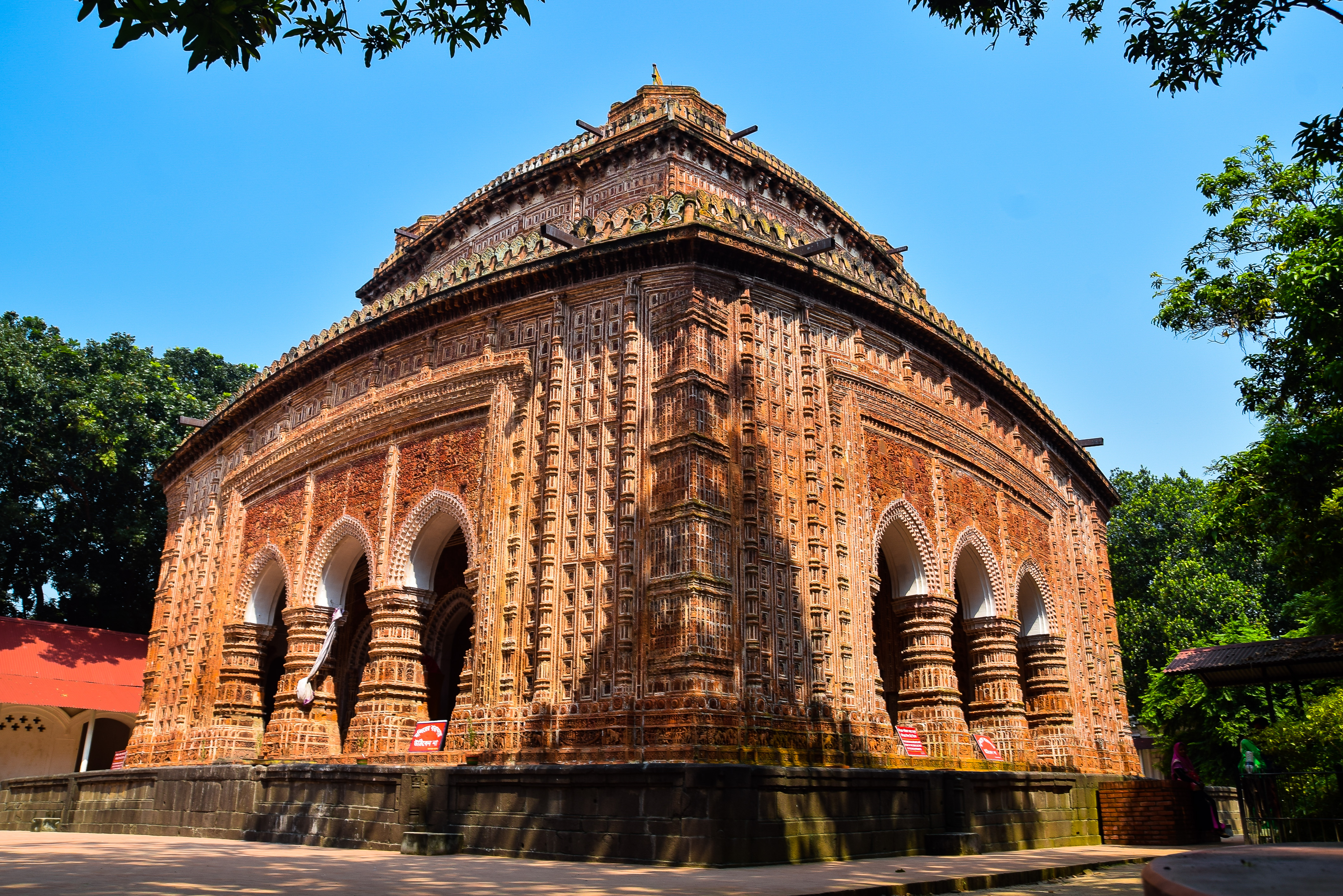
- Kantajew Temple

- Coordinates: 25°47.5′N 88°36′E
- Country: Bangladesh
- Division: Rangpur
- District: Dinajpur

Area
  - Total: 205.53 km^{2} (79.36 sq mi)

Population (2022)
  - Total: 174,564
  - Density: 849.34/km^{2} (2,199.8/sq mi)
- Time zone: UTC+6 (BST)
- Postal code: 5226
- Website: Official Map of Kaharole

Kaharole Upazila mauza geocode map

Kaharole Upazila (Bengali: কাহারোল) is an upazila of Dinajpur District in the Division of Rangpur, Bangladesh.

== Geography ==
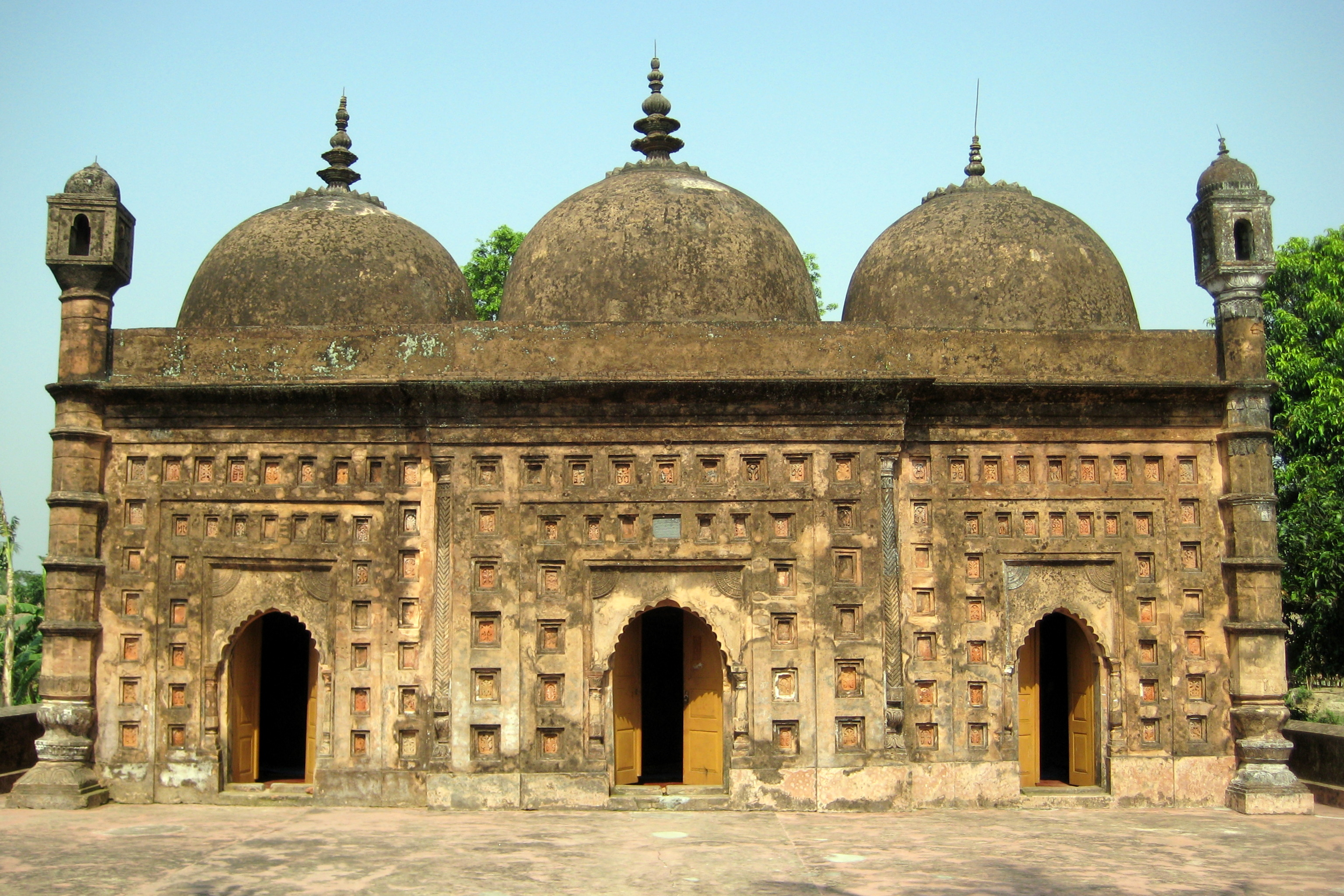
Nayabad Mosque in Kaharole Upazila

Kaharole Upazila is bounded by Birganj Upazila on the north, Dinajpur Sadar Upazila and Biral Upazila on the south, Khansama and Dinajpur Sadar Upazila on the east, and Bochaganj Upazila on the west.

Kaharole is located at 25.7917°N 88.6000°E. It has 36,759 households and a total area of 205.53 km^{2}.

== Demographics ==
According to the 2022 Bangladeshi census, Kaharole Upazila had 42,806 households and a population of 174,564. 8.97% of the population were under 5 years of age. Kaharole had a literacy rate (age 7 and over) of 74.47%: 79.38% for males and 69.57% for females, and a sex ratio of 100.42 males for every 100 females. 14,683 (8.41%) lived in urban areas.

According to the 2011 Census of Bangladesh, Kaharole Upazila had 36,759 households and a population of 154,432. 34,083 (22.07%) were under 10 years of age. Kaharole had a literacy rate (age 7 and over) of 51.32%, compared to the national average of 51.8%, and a sex ratio of 999 females per 1000 males. 7,355 (4.76%) lived in urban areas. Ethnic population was 3,376 (2.19%), of which Santal were 3,305.

As of the 1991 Bangladesh census, Kaharole has a population of 118,379. Males constitute 51.78% of the population, and females 48.22%. Kaharole's population over 18 years old is 60,240.

=== Ethnicity and religion ===
Religions in Kaharole Upazila (2022)
Religion	Percent
Islam	55.14%
Hinduism	43.59%
Ethnic religion	0.64%
Christianity	0.63%

Population by religion in Union
Union	Muslim	Hindu	Others
Dabar Union	13,108	13,575	185
Mukundapur Union	25,479	9,453	801
Ramchandrapur Union	13,253	15,921	321
Rasulpur Union	11,415	13,836	360
Sundarpur Union	23,274	7,484	357
Targaon Union	9,718	15,822	195

🟩 Muslim majority 🟧 Hindu majority

Population of upazila by ethnicity (2022)
1. Bengali (98.5%)
2. Santal (1.50%)
3. Others (0.04%)

Bengali Muslims are the majority community while Bengali Hindus are a large minority which makes up a majority in 3 out of 5 unions. Ethnic population is 2684 (1.54%) of which Santals are 2611.

== Administration ==
UNO: Md. Kamruzzaman Sarkar.

Kaharole, which was formed in 1904 as a Thana, was turned into an upazila in 1984.

Kaharole Upazila is divided into six union parishads: Dabor, Mukundapur, Ramchandrapur, Rasulpur, Sundarpur, and Targaon. The union parishads are subdivided into 153 mauzas and 152 villages.
