= Dinajpur Rajbari =

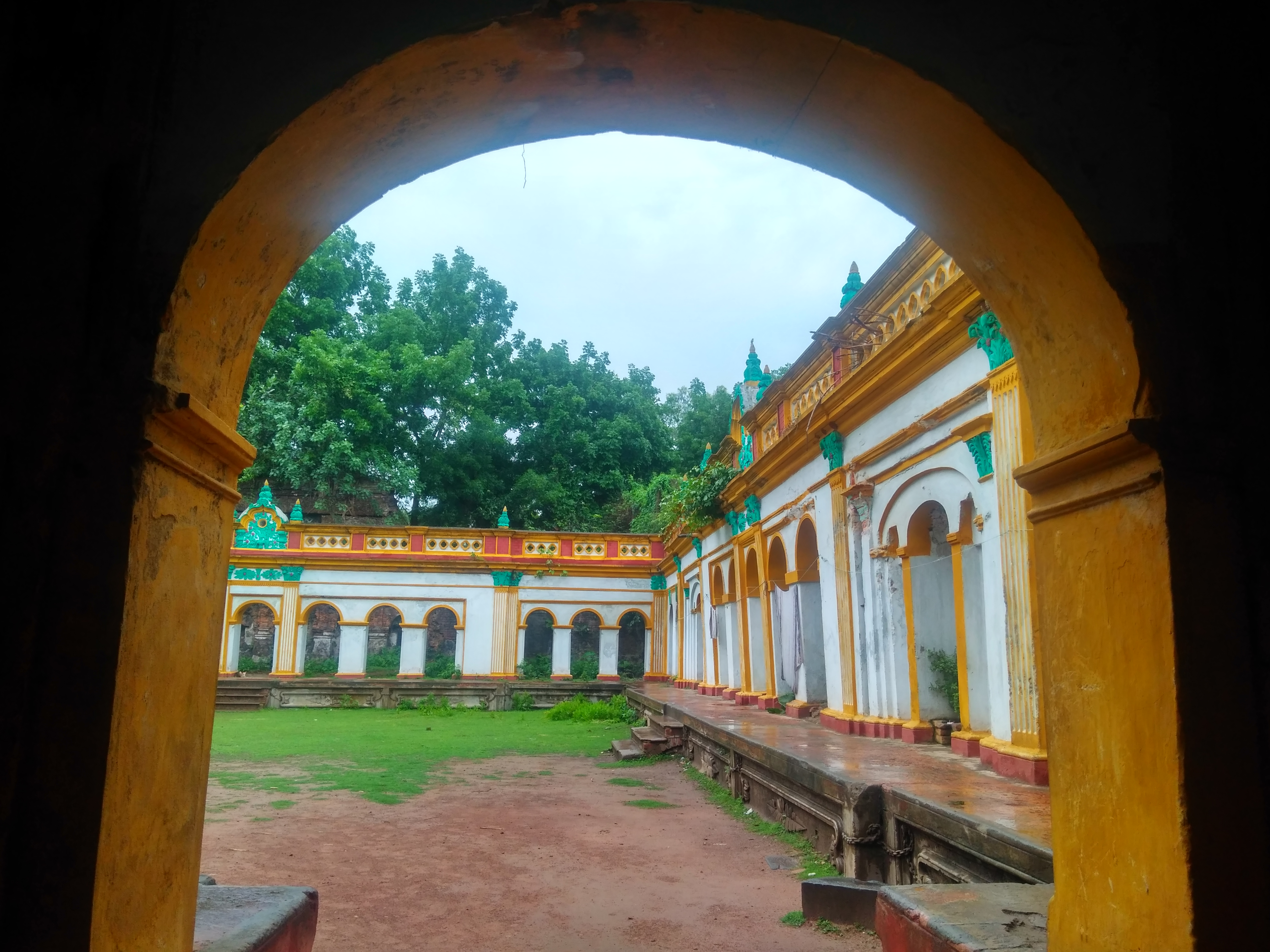
- Interactive map of the Dinajpur Rajbari area

General information
- Coordinates: 25.646031°N 88.655511°E

The Dinajpur Rajbari (Bengali: দিনাজপুর রাজবাড়ী) is a palace in Bangladesh.

== History ==
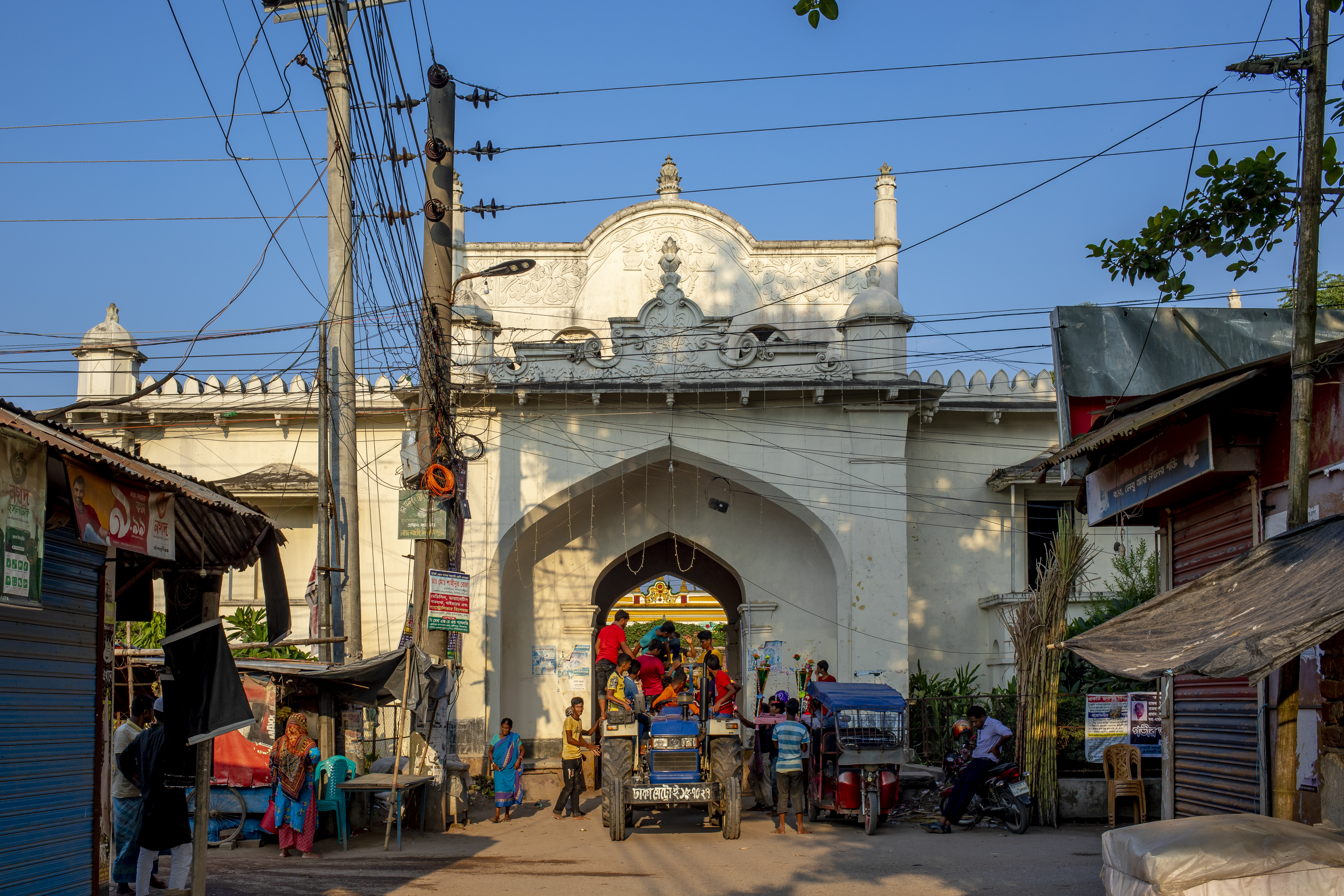
Main Entrance of Dinajpur Rajbari

The palace was a symbol for the greater Dinajpur district from 1806 to 1951. The building is divided into 3 mahals, these are the Aina Mahal which houses a court house decorated with glass and marble, a library and a treasure house (Toshakhana), in addition to the Rajbari consists of the Mahal Rani, in which part of the old structure was demolished in the 30's to build a building that is used as a shelter for families run by the Department of Social Services. The Aina Mahal also contained a musical demonstration assembly, known as Jalsa Ghar. The palace was abandoned after the abolition of the zamindari system in 1951. Maharaja Girijanath of Dinajpur left the palace after the partition of the country and moved with his family to India. The palace is one of the oldest in Bangladesh. The origins of Rajbari are not very clear, but according to local historians the palace was established by Raja Dinaraj Ghosh, but there is documentation that King Srimanta Dutta founded the palace. During the reigns of King Prananath & Ramnath the Aina Mahal was built. It is also believed that the founder of Rajbari was the King Raja Ganesha in the early 15th century. Part of the Rajbari structures were established by different Zamindars and Rajas. The Rajbari occupies 16.41 acres of land, and much of the structure is in ruins. Since the East Bengal State Acquisition and Tenancy Act of 1950, the ownership of the Rajbari was transferred to the government. In the East Pakistan period during the Ayub Khan regime, Rajbari objects such as furniture, silver weapons and bronze utensils were sold.

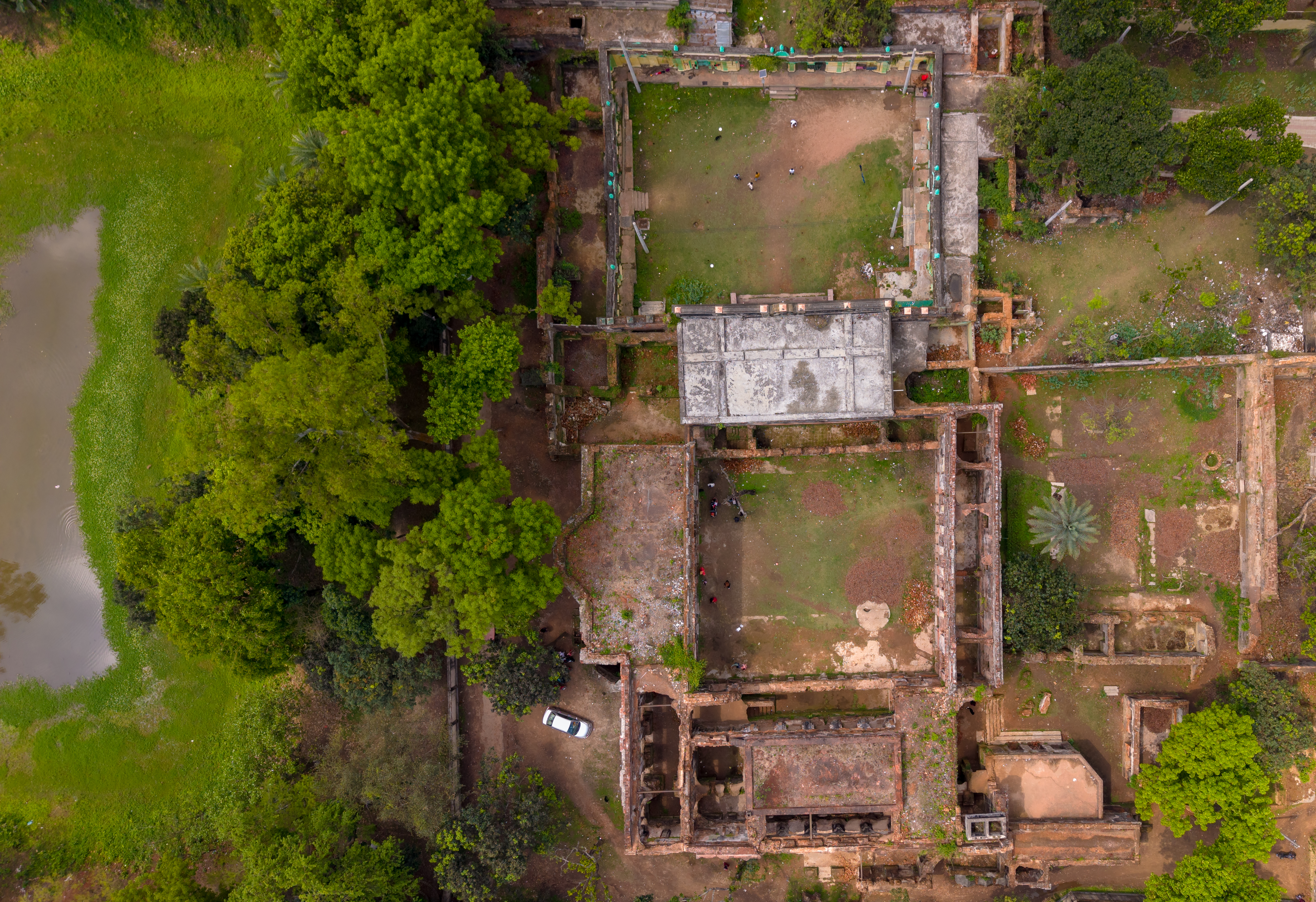
Dinajpur Rajbari Aerial View
