= Chirirbandar Upazila =

Chirirbandar চিরিরবন্দর
- Upazila
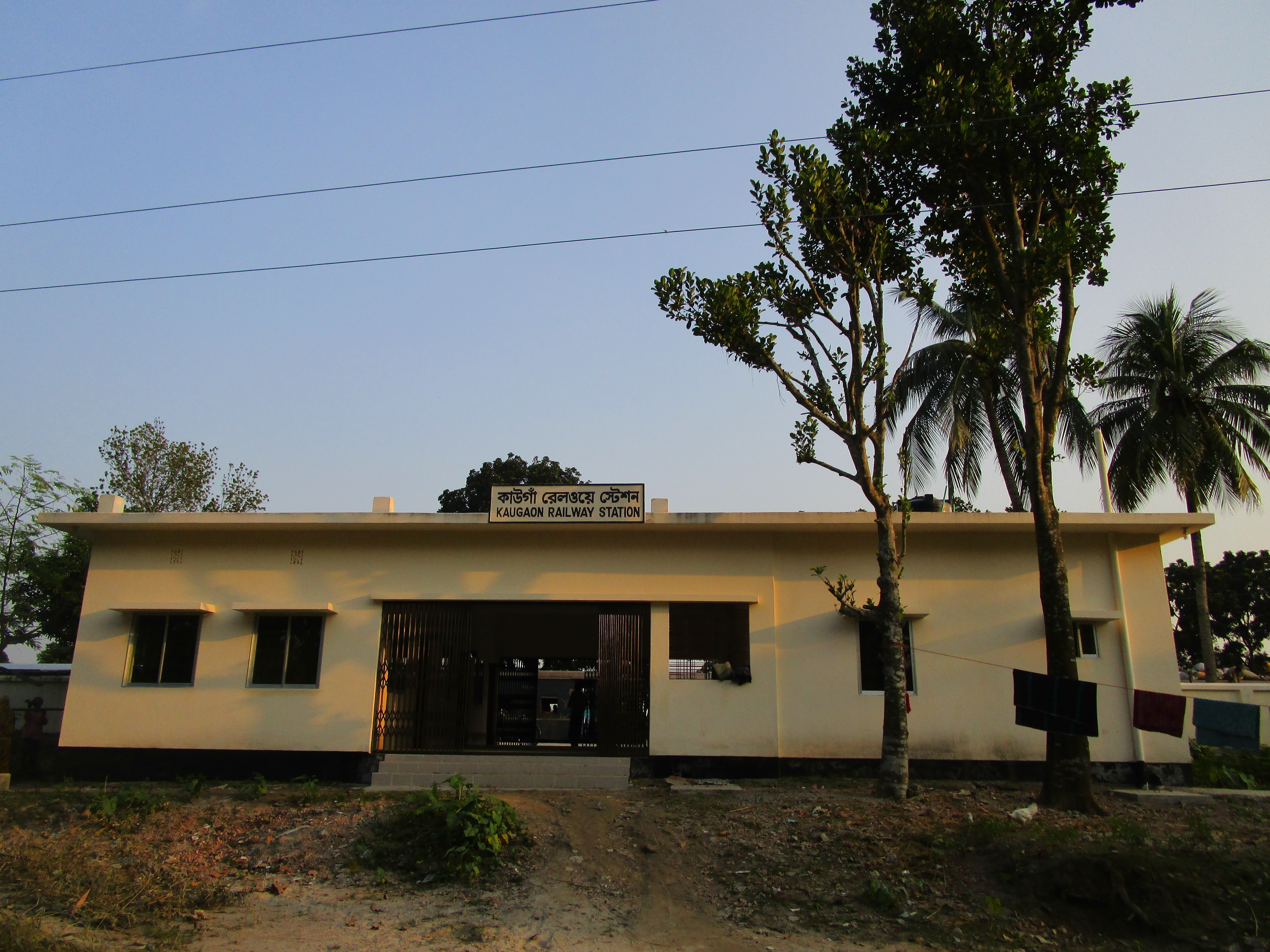
- Kaogaon Railway Station

- Coordinates: 25°39.8′N 88°47′E
- Country: Bangladesh
- Division: Rangpur
- District: Dinajpur

Area
  - Total: 312.69 km^{2} (120.73 sq mi)

Population (2022)
  - Total: 323,880
  - Density: 1,035.8/km^{2} (2,682.7/sq mi)
- Time zone: UTC+6 (BST)
- Postal code: 5240
- Area code: 05326
- Website: Official Map of Chirirbandar

Chirirbandar Upazila mauza geocode map

Chirirbandar (Bengali: চিরিরবন্দর) is an upazila of Dinajpur District in Rangpur, Bangladesh.

== Geography ==
Chirirbandar is located at 25.6625°N 88.7833°E - it has 68,415 households and total area 312.69 km^{2}.

Chirirbandar Upazila is bounded by Khansama Upazila on the north, Parbatipur Upazila in Dinajpur District and Saidpur Upazila in Nilphamari District on the east, Fulbari Upazila and Kumarganj CD Block in Dakshin Dinajpur district, West Bengal, India, on the south, and Dinajpur Sadar Upazila on the west.

Ranibandar is the commercial hub of Chirirbandar Upazila.

== Administration ==
UNO: A K M Shariful Hoque.

Chirirbandar Thana was established in 1914 and it was turned into an upazila in 1984.

The upazila is divided into 12 union parishads: Abdulpur, Alokdihi, Amarpur, Auliapukur, Fatejangpur, Isobpur, Nashratpur, Punotti, Saitara, Satnala, Tetulia, and Viail.

The union parishads are subdivided into 145 mauzas and 142 villages.

== See also ==
- Upazilas of Bangladesh
- Districts of Bangladesh
- Divisions of Bangladesh
- Dinajpur District, Bangladesh
