= Khansama Upazila =

Khansama খানসামা
- Upazila
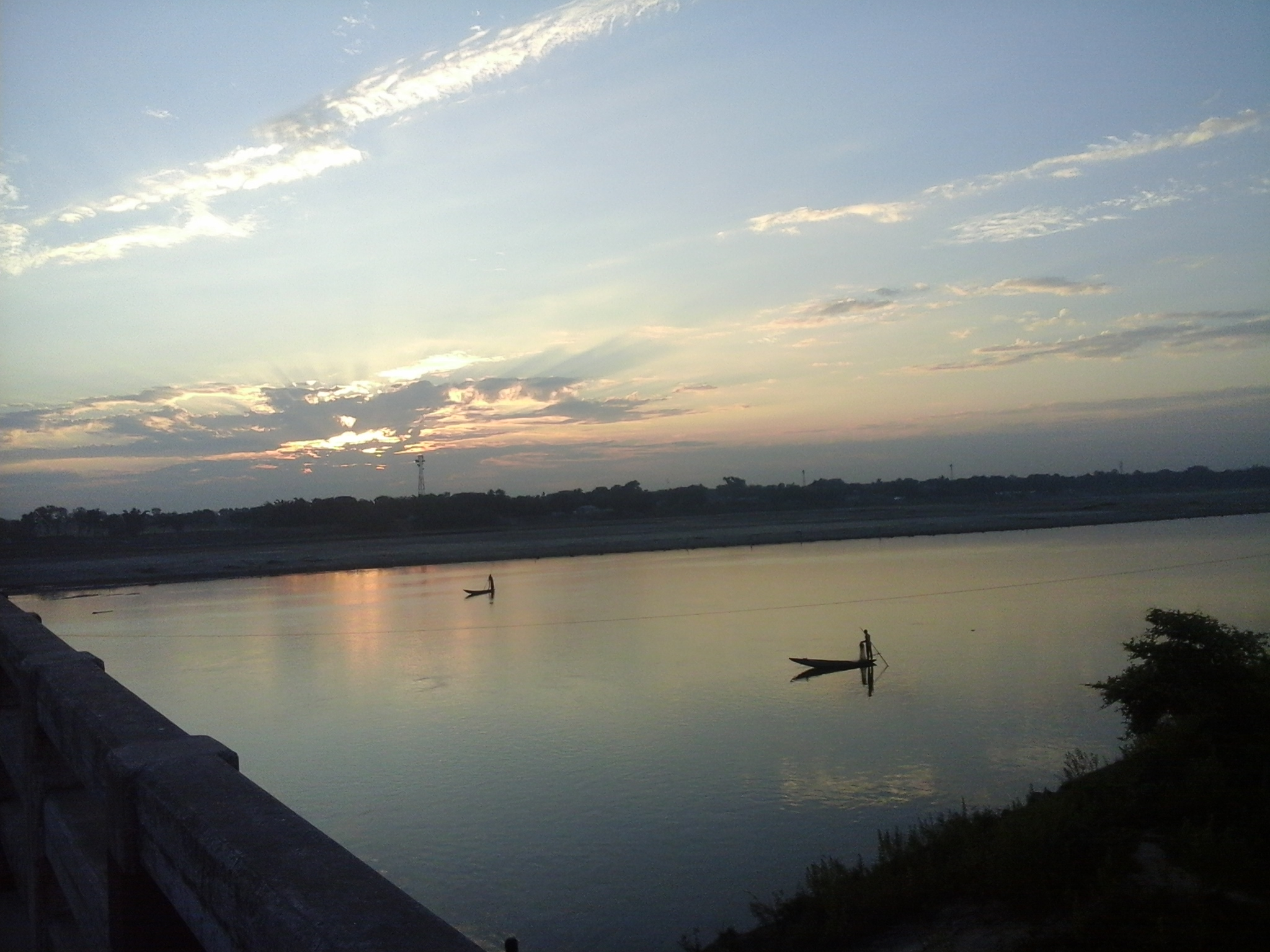
- Atrai River in Khansama Upazila

- Coordinates: 25°55.7′N 88°44′E
- Country: Bangladesh
- Division: Rangpur
- District: Dinajpur

Area
  - Total: 179.72 km^{2} (69.39 sq mi)

Population (2022)
  - Total: 197,402
  - Density: 1,098.4/km^{2} (2,844.8/sq mi)
- Time zone: UTC+6 (BST)
- Postal code: 5230
- Website: khansama.dinajpur.gov.bd

Khansama Upazila mauza geocode map

Khansama (Bengali: খানসামা) is an upazila of Dinajpur District in the Division of Rangpur, Bangladesh.

== Geography ==
Khansama is located at 25.9278°N 88.7333°E; it has a total area of 179.72 km^{2}.

The upazila is bounded by Debiganj and Nilphamari Sadar upazilas on the north, Chirirbandar and Dinajpur Sadar upazilas on the south, Nilphamari Sadar upazila on the east, Kaharole and Birganj upazilas on the west.

== History ==
Khansama is a Persian word. Its lexical meaning - servant or servant. It is said that a wealthy merchant in this upazila (somehow the British merchant in some sense) had a very loyal servant. The servant gained immense reputation for honesty, fidelity and etiquette. In order to keep his memory memorable, this region is named after 'Khansamama'. Khansama was named as 21 January 1891. Khansama thana was created in 1891 and it was turned into an upazila in 1983.

== Demographics ==
Religions in Khansama Upazila (2022)
Religion	Percent
Islam	72.68%
Hinduism	27.11%
Other or not stated	0.21%

According to the 2022 Bangladeshi census, Khansama Upazila had 47,537 households and a population of 197,402. 9.70% of the population were under 5 years of age. Khansama had a literacy rate (age 7 and over) of 71.02%: 74.15% for males and 67.86% for females, and a sex ratio of 101.43 males for every 100 females. 30,191 (15.29%) lived in urban areas.

According to the 2011 Census of Bangladesh, Khansama Upazila had 39,440 households and a population of 171,764. 39,771 (23.15%) were under 10 years of age. Khansama had a literacy rate (age 7 and over) of 47.51%, compared to the national average of 51.8%, and a sex ratio of 980 females per 1000 males. 8,973 (5.22%) lived in urban areas.

As of the 1991 Bangladesh census, Khansama has a population of 123782. Males constitute 50.85% of the population, and females 49.15%. This Upazila's eighteen up population is 60772. Khansama has an average literacy rate of 23.2% (7+ years); the national average is 32.4% literacy.

== Administration ==
UNO: Md. Taz Uddin.

Khansama, formed as a Thana in 1891, was converted into an upazila in 1983.

Khansama Upazila is divided into six union parishads: Alokjhari, Angarpara, Bhabki, Bherbheri, Goaldihi, and Khamarpara. The union parishads are subdivided into 57 mauzas and 57 villages.

== Notable people ==
- Abul Hassan Mahmood Ali, Member of Parliament for Dinajpur-4

== See also ==
- Upazilas of Bangladesh
- Districts of Bangladesh
- Divisions of Bangladesh
- Dinajpur District, Bangladesh
