= Dinajpur District, Bangladesh =

Districts of Bangladesh in Rangpur Division

Dinajpur District দিনাজপুর জেলা
- District of Bangladesh
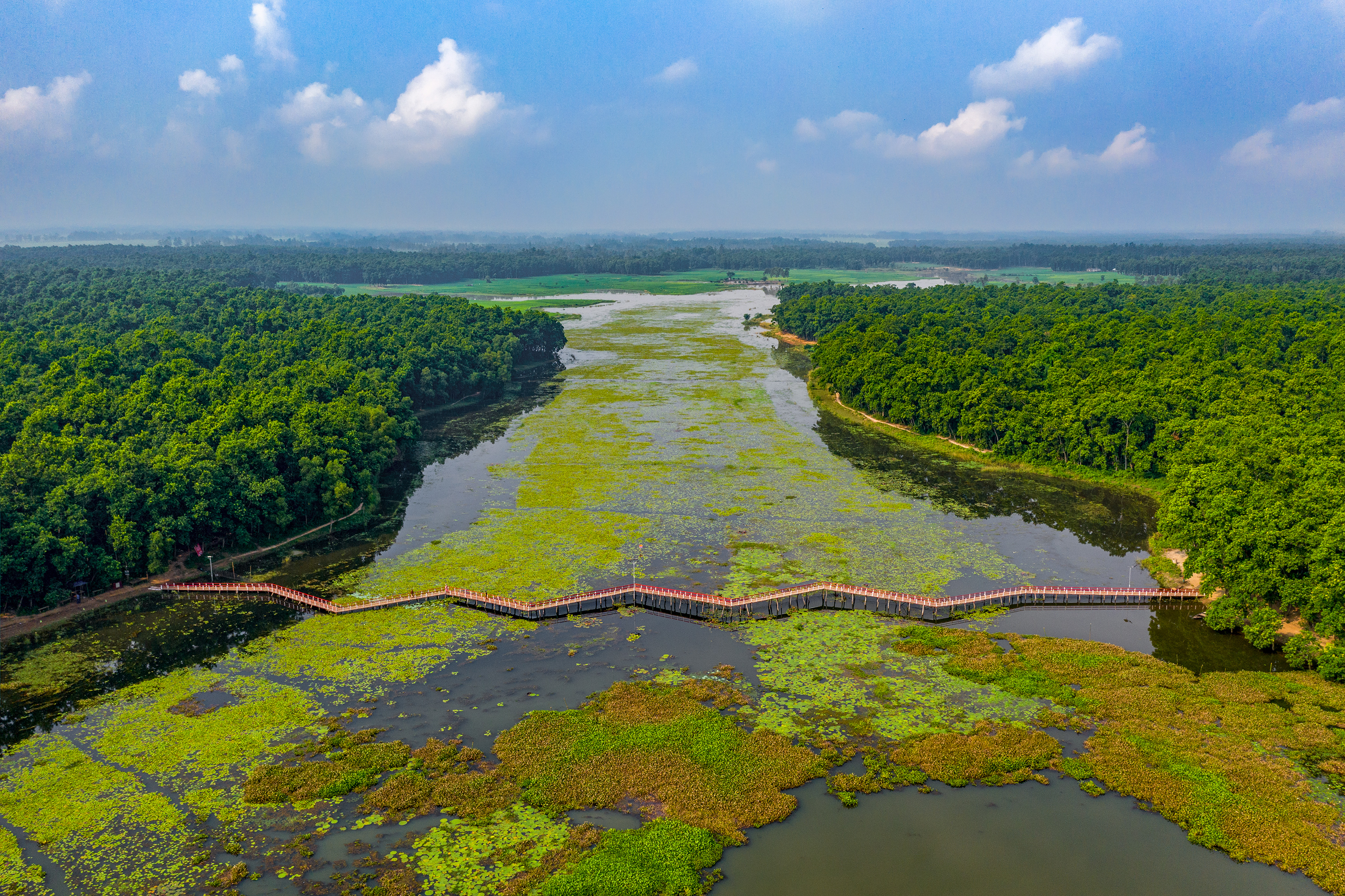
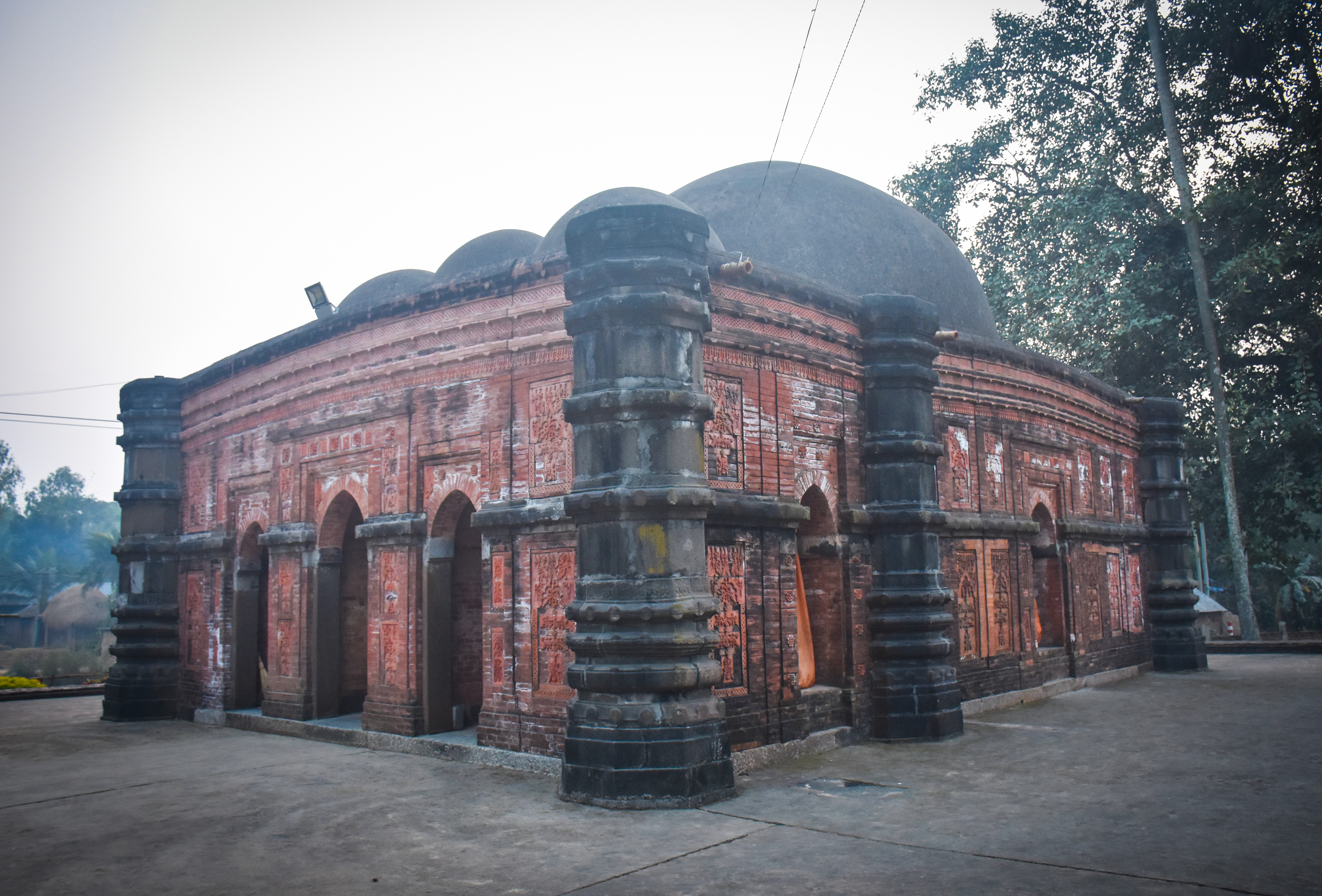
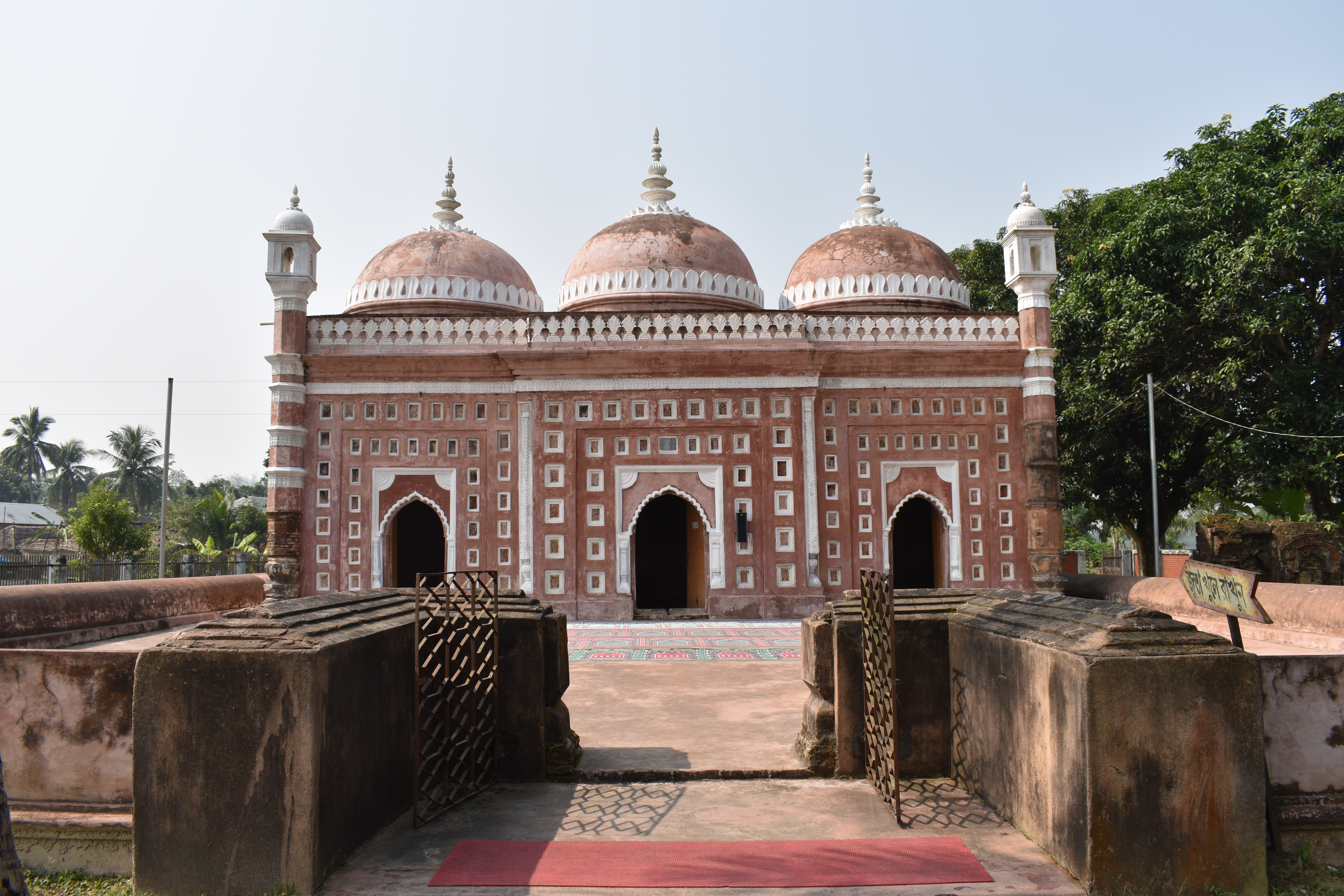
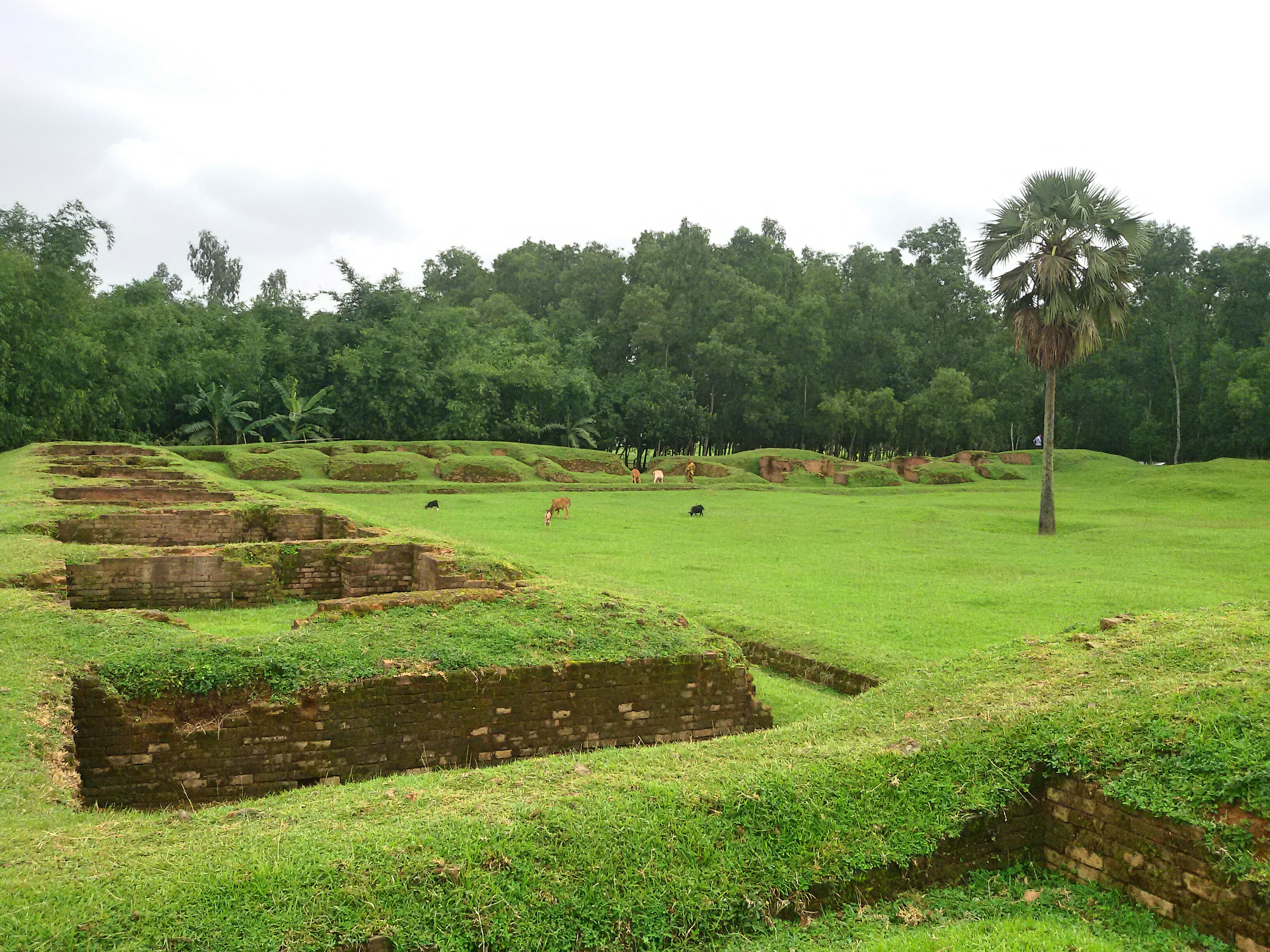
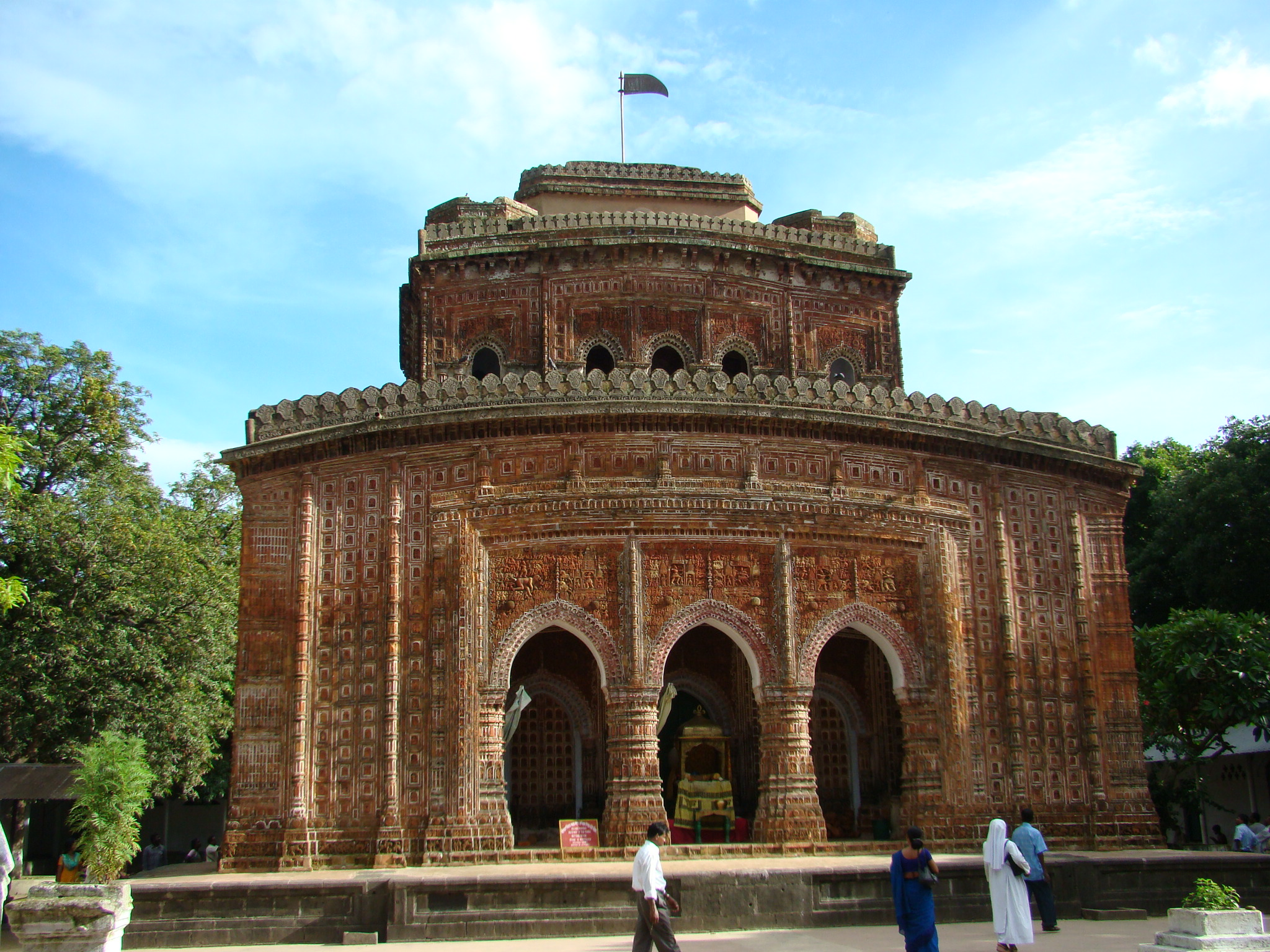
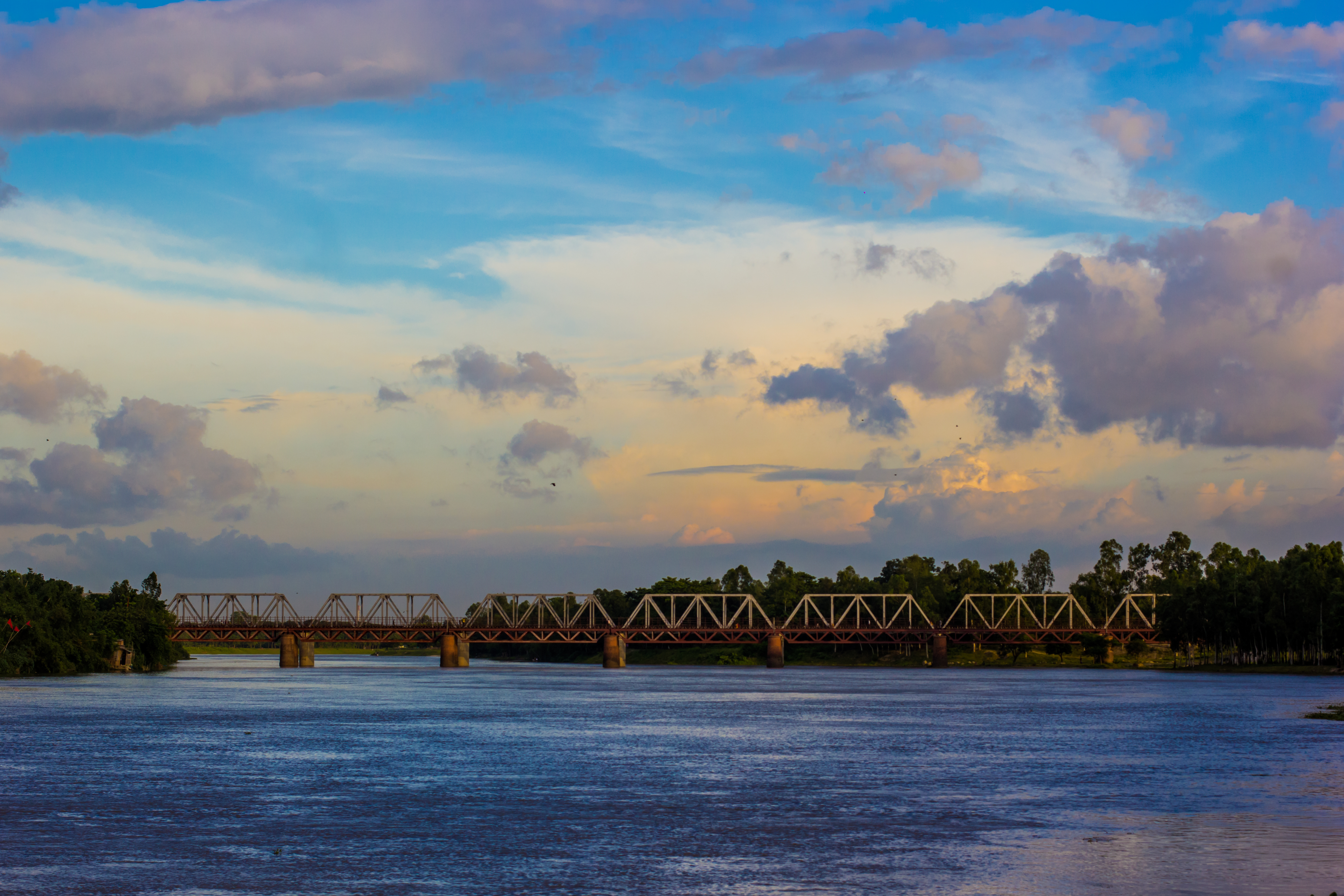
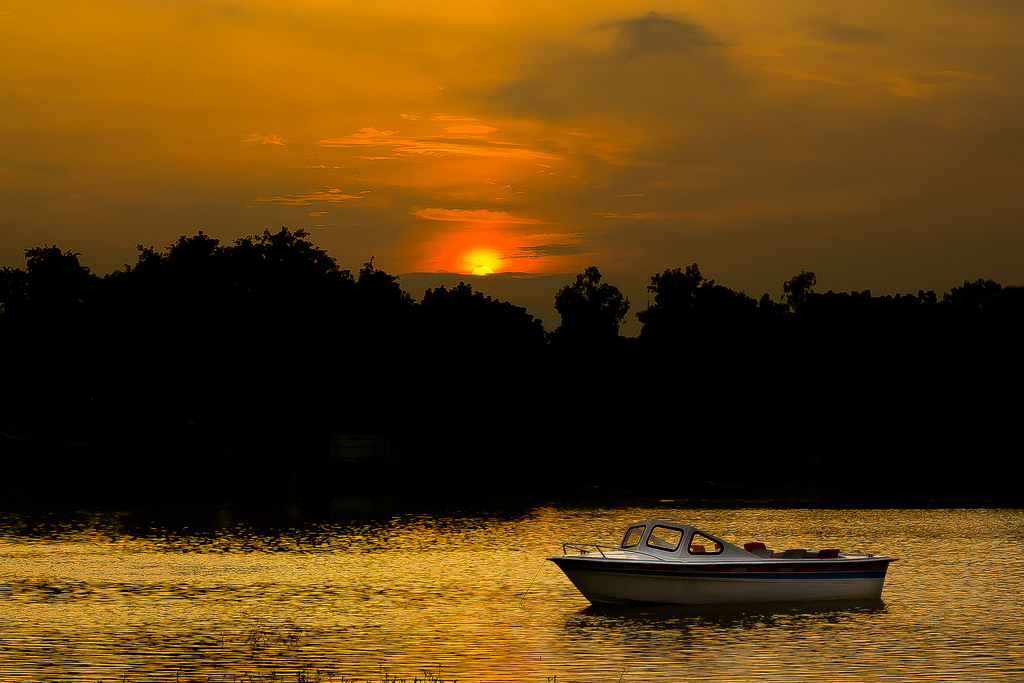
- Clockwise from top : Nawabganj National Park, Nayabad Mosque, Kantajew Temple, Matasagor Lake, Railway bridge (over Punorvaba river, Dinajpur) Sitakot Vihara, Sura Mosque,

- Location of Dinajpur District, Bangladesh in Bangladesh
- Interactive map of Dinajpur District
- Coordinates: 25.63°N 88.65°E
- Country: Bangladesh
- Division: Rangpur Division
- Seat and largest city: Dinajpur

Government
  - Deputy Commissioner: Rafiqul Islam
  - Superintendent of Police: Zedan Al Musa

Area
  - Total: 3,444.30 km^{2} (1,329.85 sq mi)

Population (2022)
  - Total: 3,315,236
  - Density: 962.528/km^{2} (2,492.94/sq mi)
- Time zone: UTC+06:00 (BST)
- Postal code: 5200
- Area code: 0531
- ISO 3166 code: BD-14
- HDI (2022): 0.668 medium · 10th of 21
- Website: Official Website

Dinajpur District (Bengali: দিনাজপুর জেলা) is a district in Rangpur Division of northern Bangladesh. Dinajpur is the largest among all sixteen northern districts of Bangladesh.

== History ==
Dinajpur was once a part of the ancient state of Pundravardhana. Devkot (now in India) which rotated as the capital of Lakhnauti was located 18 kilometres (11 mi) south of Dinajpur town. It is also called "City of Maharajas".

An ancient engraved stone, believed to be from the Gupta era, was recovered from the bank of a pond near Sura Masjid in the Ghoraghat Upazila in Dinajpur in 8 October.

=== British colonial period ===
The British administrative control in Dinajpur was established in 1786. Dinajpur was the biggest administrative district of undivided Bengal. In 1765, the British got the Dewani of Bengal and in 1772, an English District Collector and Chief of Revenue was appointed in Dinajpur. The area was then notorious for lawlessness. Mr. Marriott was Collector in 1786. Next to him, Mr. Red Fern and Mr. Vansittart were Collectors for short periods. The next Collector, Mr. Hatch, started to exercise judicial powers too. The District Magistrate's area at that time extended to Malda, Bagura, and Dinajpur. In the last decade of the 18th century, indigo plantation started in the district.

The district Dinajpur in British times included a greater portion of Bagura. Malda and parts of Rajshahi, Rangpur, and Purnea. At the time of Revenue Survey in 1857–1861, the total area of the district was 11,880 km^{2} (4,586 sq mi). Between 1795 and 1800, large tracts of land were transferred to Purnea, Rangpur and Rajshahi for administrative convenience and better enforcement of law and order. In 1833, again some estates were transferred to Bagura and Malda. In 1864–65, 1868 and 1870 further transfer of territory from Dinajpur to Malda and Bagura took place. Finally in 1897–98, the whole of Thana Mahadevpur was made over to Rajshahi. At that time, except Thakurgaon Sub division, the rest of Dinajpur district remained under the direct supervision of the collector.

At first, after its formation in 1856, the Dinajpur Municipality used to be run by a town committee presided over by the Deputy Magistrate. This was among the first 40 municipalities in Bengal at that time. Later in 1868, the 'District Town Act' commissioned a chairman of the municipality who replaced the Deputy Magistrate and given a similar rank as a district magistrate. Mr. Patterson was appointed the first chairman of Dinajpur Municipality in 1869.

=== Recent history ===
At the time of Partition of India in 1947, part of greater Dinajpur district was included in West Bengal and it was named West Dinajpur district. People of the district took part in the Tebhaga movement and also had significant contribution in the War of Independence of 1971.

== Geography ==
Dinajpur is bounded by Thakurgaon and Panchagarh districts in the north, Gaibandha and Joypurhat districts in the south, Nilphamari and Rangpur districts in the east, and the state of West Bengal, India in the west. The total area of the district is 3,437.98 km^{2}. The main rivers of the district are the Dhepa, the Punarbhaba, and the Atrai rivers.

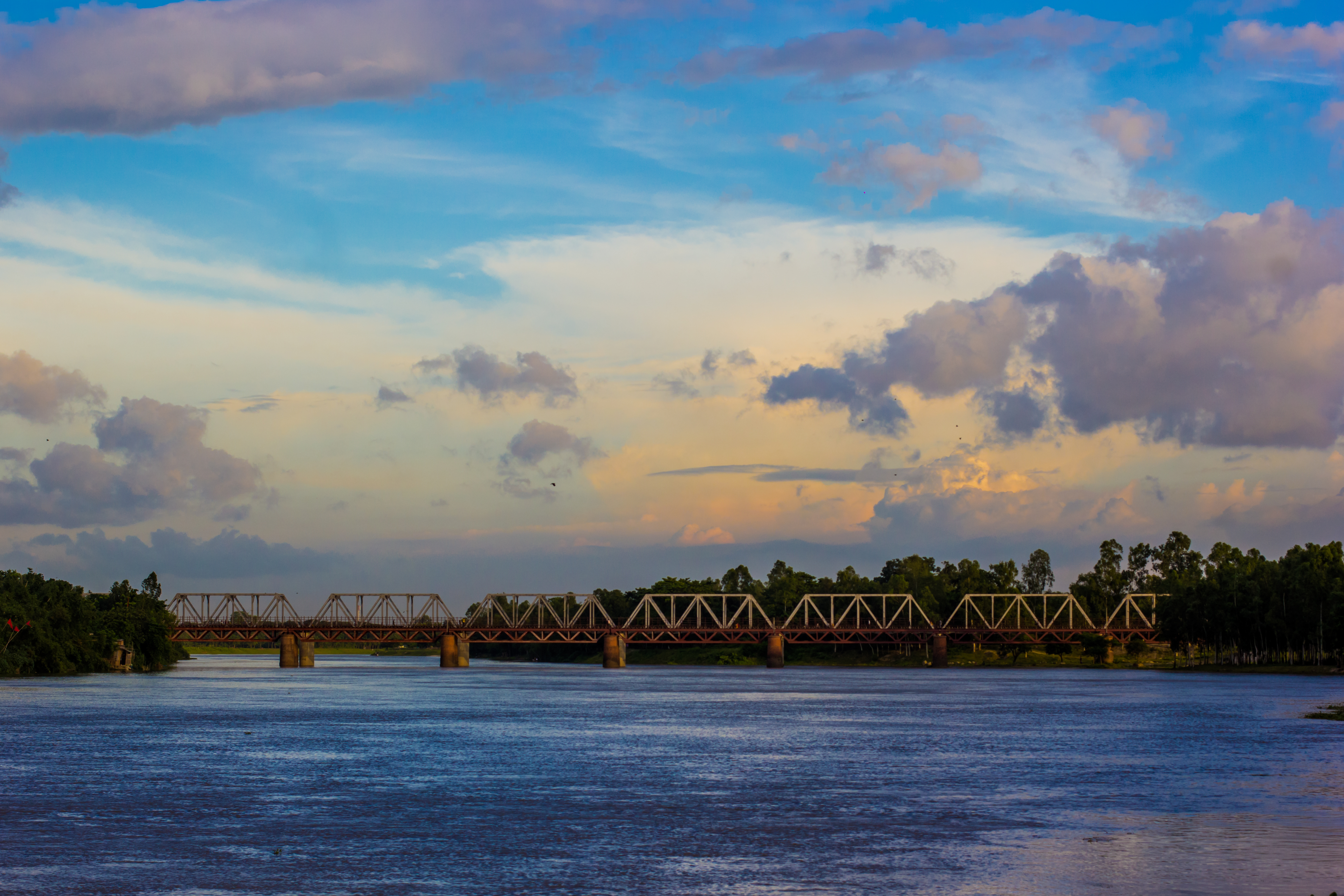
Dinajpur Railway Bridge, Punarbhaba River

The district has a total area of 3437.98 km^{2}, located in between 25°10' and 26°04' north latitudes and in between 88°23' and 89°18' east longitudes.

=== Climate ===
Dinajpur experiences a hot, wet and humid tropical climate. Under the Köppen climate classification, Dinajpur has a humid subtropical climate. The district has a distinct monsoonal season, with an annual average temperature of 25 °C (77 °F) and monthly means varying between 18 °C (64 °F) in January and 29 °C (84 °F) in August.

Climate data for Dinajpur
Month	Jan	Feb	Mar	Apr	May	Jun	Jul	Aug	Sep	Oct	Nov	Dec	Year
Mean daily maximum °C (°F)	22 (72)	26 (79)	31 (88)	32 (90)	32 (90)	32 (90)	33 (91)	32 (90)	32 (90)	31 (88)	29 (84)	25 (77)	29 (84)
Mean daily minimum °C (°F)	12 (54)	15 (59)	19 (66)	22 (72)	24 (75)	26 (79)	27 (81)	27 (81)	26 (79)	23 (73)	18 (64)	13 (55)	23 (73)
Average precipitation mm (inches)	7.2 (0.28)	17 (0.7)	7.6 (0.30)	93.4 (3.68)	225.4 (8.87)	456.7 (17.98)	264.9 (10.43)	296.2 (11.66)	321.5 (12.66)	98.5 (3.88)	7.3 (0.29)	0.2 (0.01)	77.9 (3.07)

== Demographics ==
Historical population
Year	Pop.	±% p.a.
1974	1,457,175	—
1981	1,804,375	+3.10%
1991	2,260,131	+2.28%
2001	2,642,850	+1.58%
2011	2,990,128	+1.24%
2022	3,315,236	+0.94%

According to the 2022 census of Bangladesh, Dinajpur District had 836,977 households and a population of 3,315,236, of whom, 19.11% of the inhabitants lived in urban areas. The population density was 963 people per km^{2}. 17.20% of the population was under 10 years of age. Dinajpur had a literacy rate (age 7 and over) of 76.14%, compared to the national average of 74.80%, and a sex ratio of 100.46 males per 100 females.

Religions in Dinajpur District (2022)
Religion	Percent
Islam	78.60%
Hinduism	19.56%
Christianity	1.40%
Other or not stated	0.44%

Religion in present-day Dinajpur District
Religion	1941 (Note: Dinajpur, Biral, Parbatipur, Chirirbandar, Nawabganj, Ghoraghat, Khansama, Kaharul, Bochaganj, Birganj, and Phulbari thanas of Dinajpur district)		1981		1991		2001		2011		2022	
Religion	Pop.	%	Pop.	%	Pop.	%	Pop.	%	Pop.	%	Pop.	%
Islam	419,603	55.32%	1,364,402	75.63%	1,732,239	76.64%	2,057,030	77.83%	2,333,253	78.03%	2,605,781	78.60%
Hinduism	289,907	38.22%	383,541	21.26%	465,229	20.58%	521,925	19.75%	583,313	19.51%	648,326	19.56%
Tribal religion (Note: In the 1941 census, all members of Scheduled Tribes were recorded as following 'Tribal' religion, irrespective of their actual practiced faith.)	48,442	6.39%	—N/a	—N/a	—N/a	—N/a	—N/a	—N/a	—N/a	—N/a	—N/a	—N/a
Christianity	214	0.03%	13,385	0.74%	18,051	0.80%	27,996	1.06%	37,488	1.25%	46,315	1.40%
Others (Note: Including Jainism, Buddhism, Zoroastrianism, Judaism, Ad-Dharmis, or not stated)	328	0.04%	43,047	2.37%	44,612	1.98%	35,899	1.36%	36,274	1.21%	14,814	0.44%
Total Population	758,494	100%	1,804,375	100%	2,260,131	100%	2,642,850	100%	2,990,128	100%	3,315,236	100%

Population of Dinajpur district by ethnicity (2022)
1. Bengali (98.4%)
2. Santal (1.24%)
3. Others (0.36%)

Muslims make up 78.60% of the population, while Hindus are 19.56% and Christians 1.40%. People of other religions were 0.44% of the population. Muslims have marginally increased their population share, while Christians have rapidly increased, mainly among the ethnic minorities. There is a small population of 900 Buddhists, mainly living in Parbatipur Upazila.

The ethnic population was 52,940 (1.60%), of which 41,079 (1.24%) were Santal, 4,184 Oraon and 1,795 Musahar.

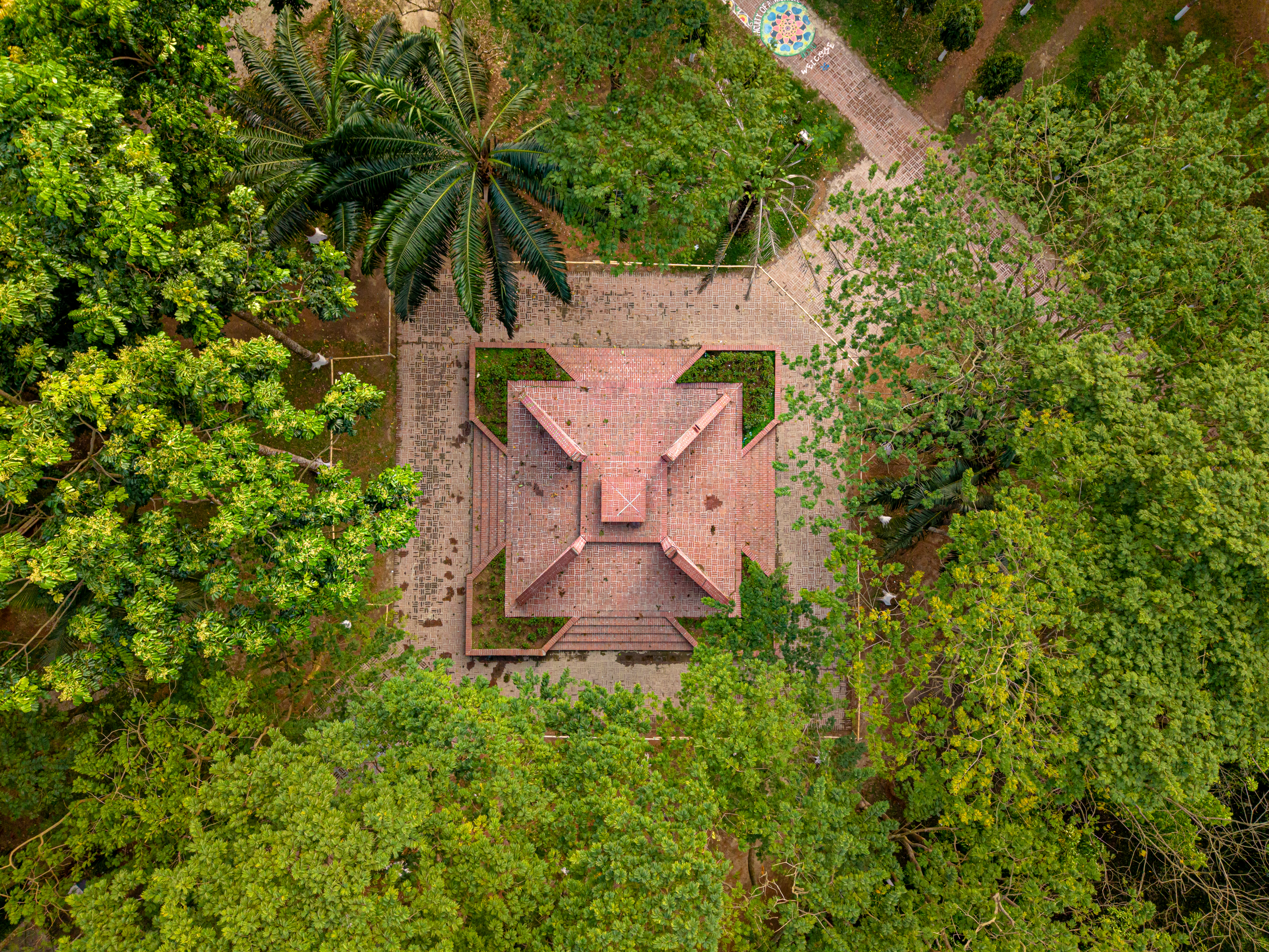
An aerial view of Saheed Minar at HSTU

== Economy ==
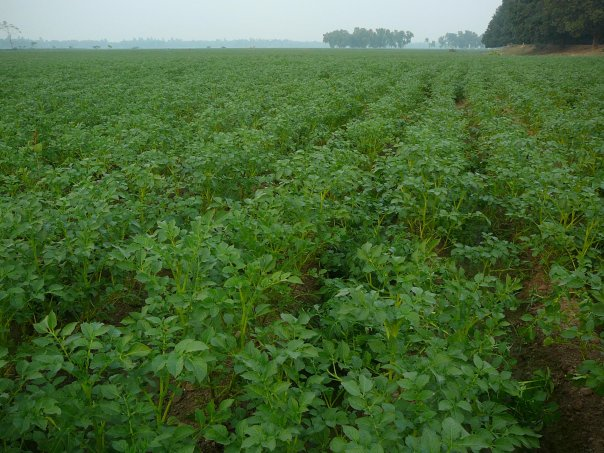
Potato field in Dinajpur

The economy of Dinajpur mainly depends upon agriculture based production. There is a well known proverb about Dinajpur – 'paddy piled up high, sheds full of cows, ponds brimming with fish' [gola bhora dhan, goyal bhora goru, pukur bhora mach]. People in this district are much happier than those in other districts, everything grows easily, it's a peaceful place. Dinajpur is famous for rice production. 'Katharivog' rice is one of the best produced rice in Bangladesh. Dinajpur is also rich with wheat production. The Lychee (fruit) of Dinajpur is the best of Bangladesh. Dinajpur is well known for its production of among the country. Dinajpur is also famous for its Mangoes. "Kosba" is called the matrix of mango. Also, it grows a plenty of vegetables and seasonal fruits. A huge percentage of people from Dinajpur depends upon agri based products. The main industry also includes rice processing mills. However, Dinajpur is highly rich with natural resources like coal, pit mine. Of the five coal field discovered so far in Bangladesh, three are in Dinajpur. The name of these deposits are-Barapukuria, Phulbari and Dighipara coal field. At present coal is being produced commercially only from the Barapukuria underground coal mine in Dinajpur district. Current production rate is about 1500 tons per day. The plan to establish an open pit mine in nearby Phulbari was aborted in 2006 in the wake of a mass protest by the locals. The coal from the Boropukuria Coal Mine is being fed to the 250MW Barapukuria Power Station.

Crops and grown in the district include rice, wheat, maize, potato, brinjal, and tomato.

Fruits grown include lychees, mangoes, bananas, jackfruits, and blackberries.

== Points of interest ==
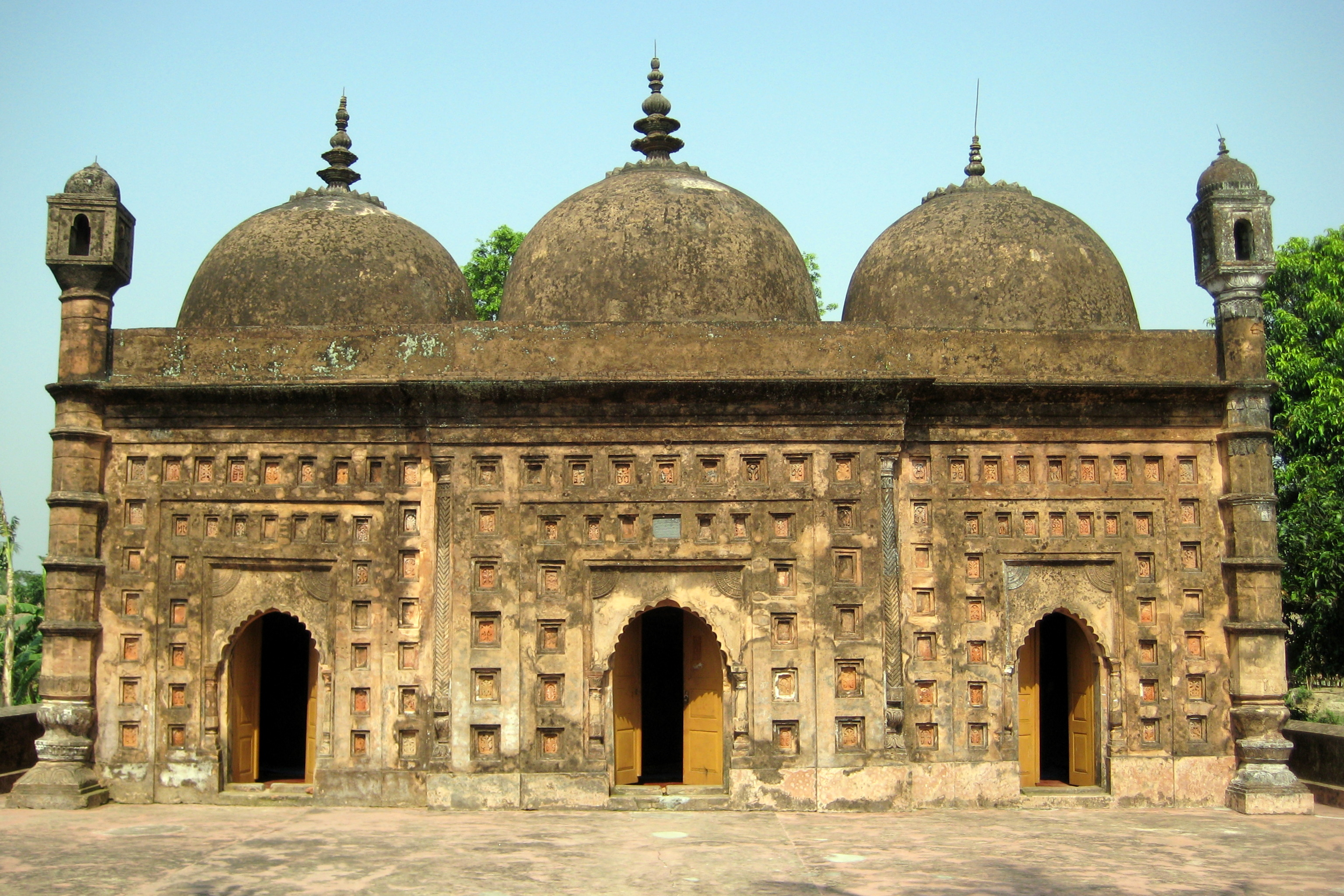
Nayabad mosque

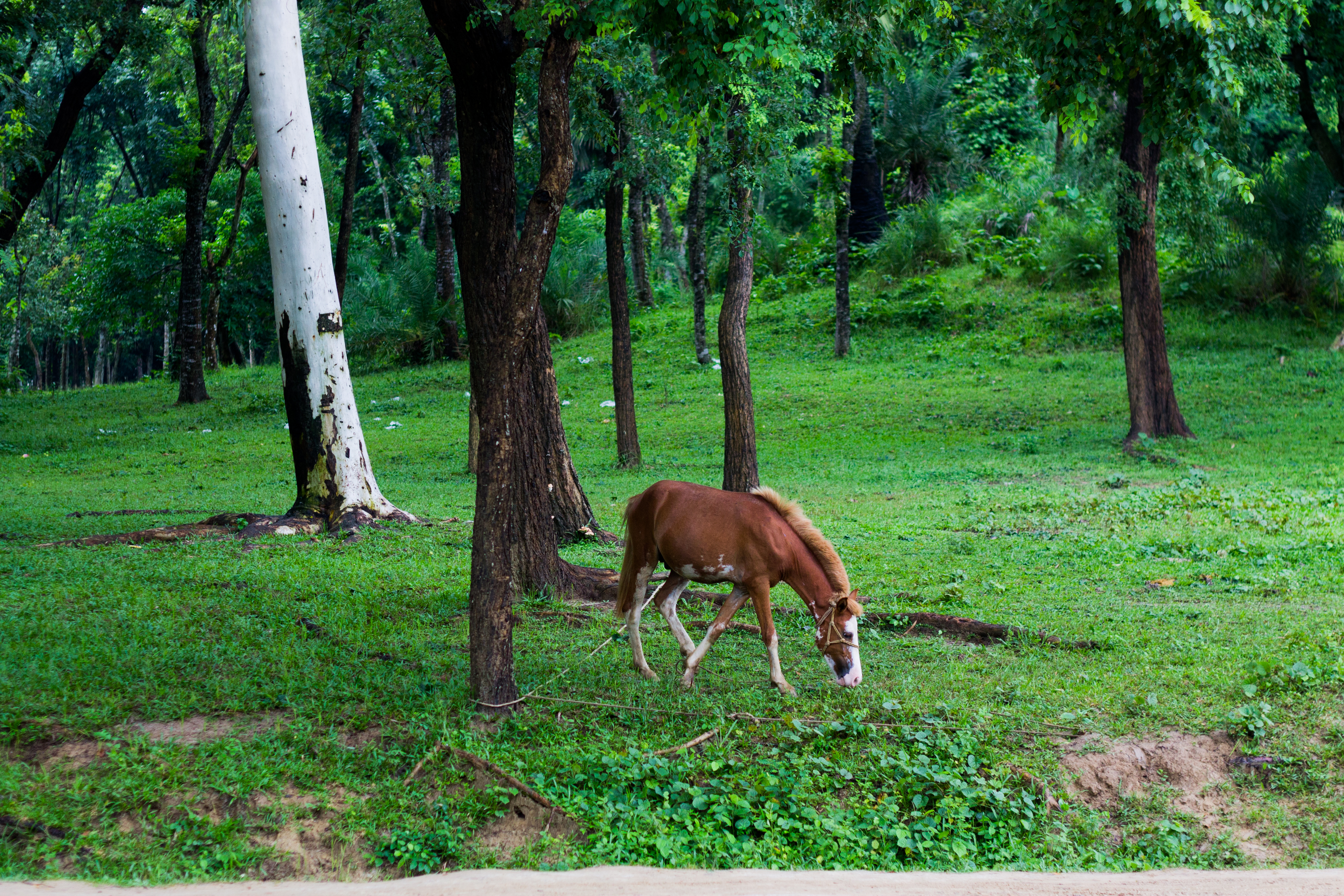
Ramsagor

- Ananda Sagar
- Aowkora Mosque – meaning "Echoing Mosque"
- Mihun er nana bari
- Dinajpur Museum
- Dinajpur Rajbari
- Dinajpur Zila School
- Dipshikha School in Rudrapur
- Ghughu-danga Zamindar Bari
- Gorashohid Boro-Moydan
- Gour Gabindha
- Habra Zamindar Bari
- Hili Land Port – The second-largest land port of Bangladesh and customs station for border trade.
- Sura Mosque
- Kaliya jue Temple
- Kantajew Temple – A late medieval Hindu temple, built from 1704 to 1722 CE
- Korai Bill, Biral
- Matasagar
- Nayabad Mosque
- Nowpara Ideal Village
- Ramsagar
- Shingha Darwaza
- Shita Coat Bihar
- Shopnopuri Artificial Amusement Park
- Shimanta Shikha Club, Hakimpur, Dinajpur
- Shita Coat Bihar, Nawabganj
- Singra Forest, Birganj
- Sita Kuthuri
- Sukhsagar
- Tombs of Chehel Gazi and Gor-e-Shahid Moydan

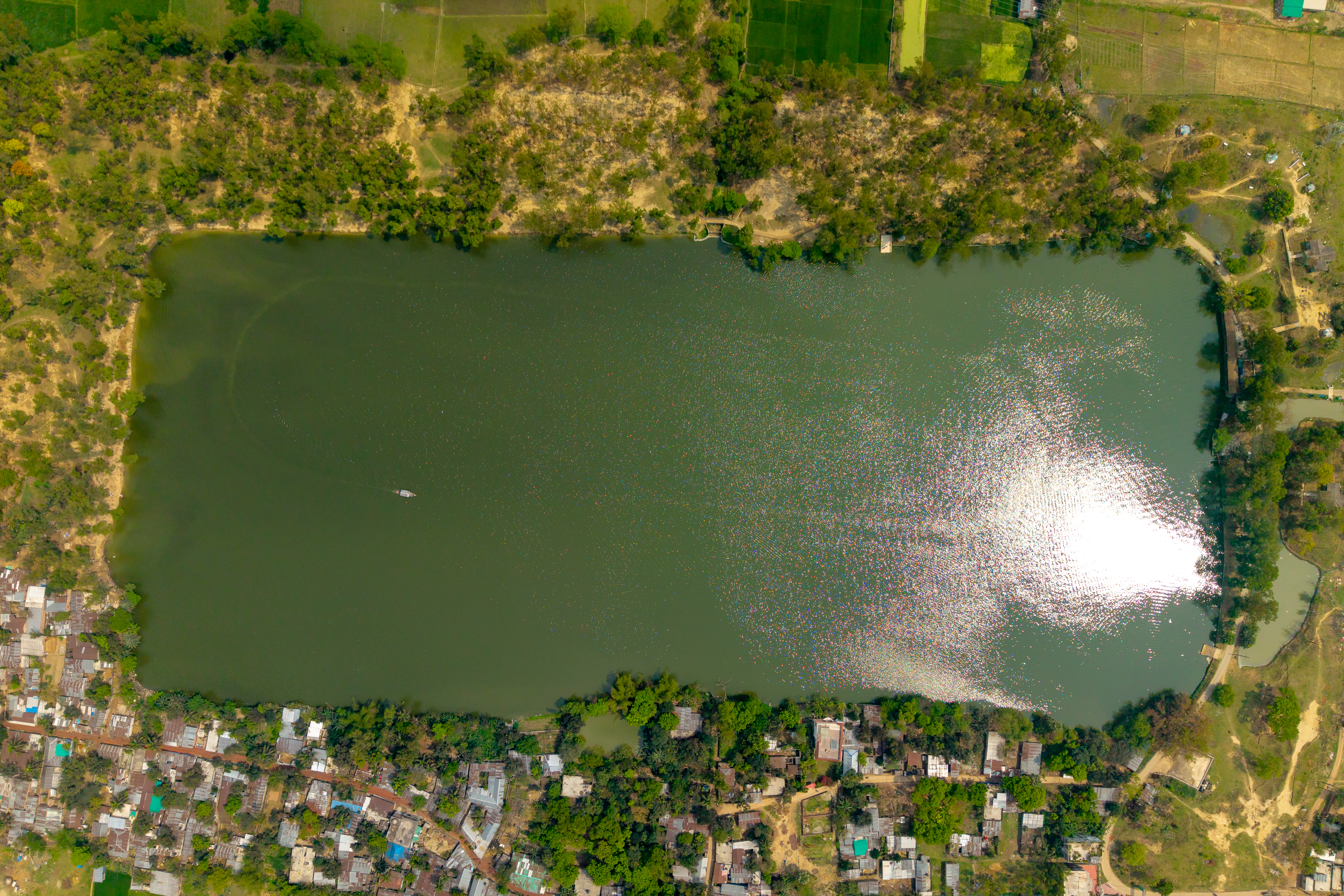
Sukhsagar Lake, Dinajpur

== Administration ==
=== Subdistricts ===
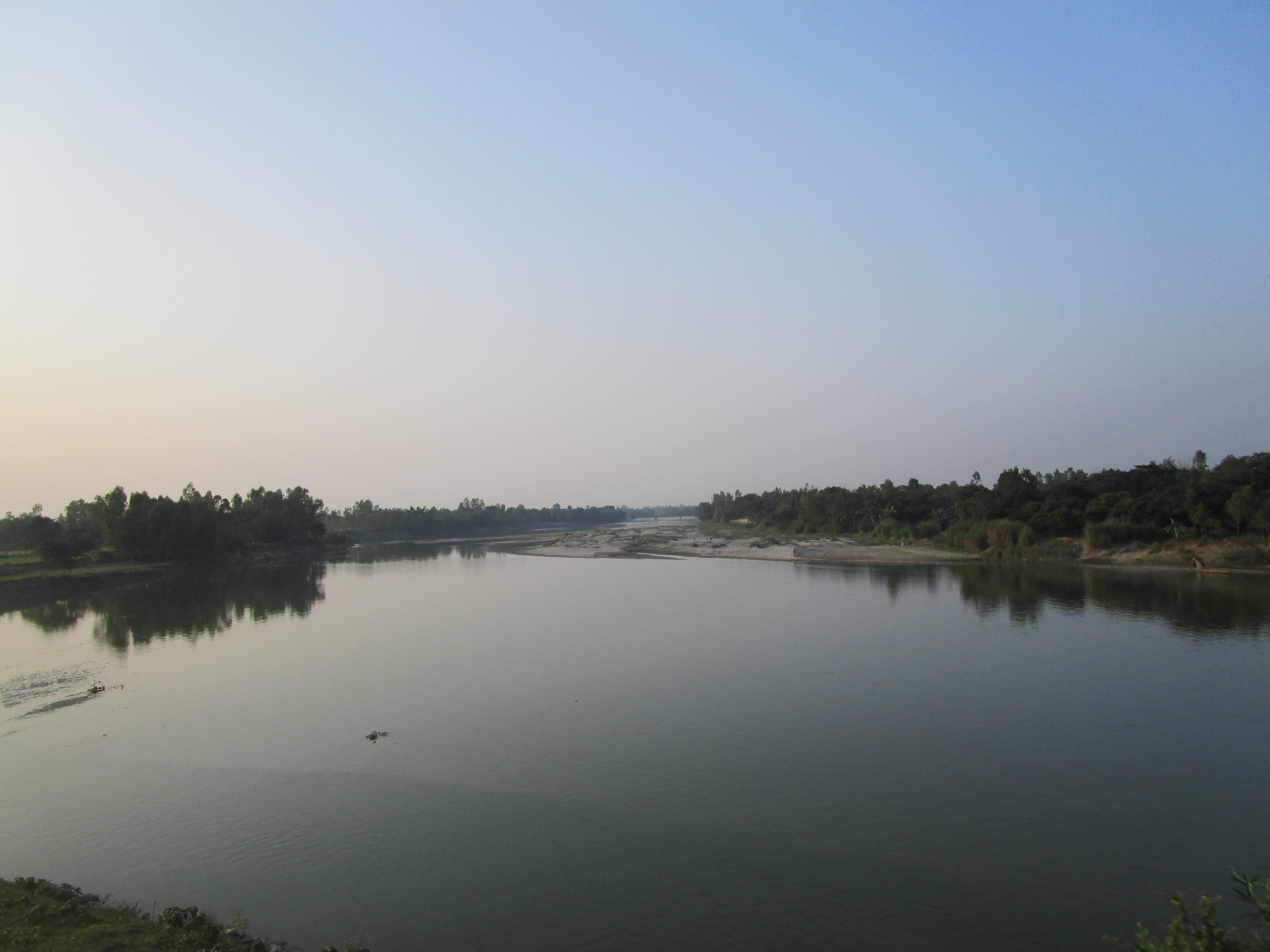
Kankra River

The upazilas of this district are:

1. Biral Upazila
2. Birampur Upazila
3. Birganj Upazila
4. Bochaganj Upazila
5. Chirirbandar Upazila
6. Dinajpur Sadar Upazila
7. Ghoraghat Upazila
8. Hakimpur Upazila
9. Kaharole Upazila
10. Khansama Upazila
11. Nawabganj Upazila
12. Parbatipur Upazila
13. Fulbari Upazila

== Transport ==
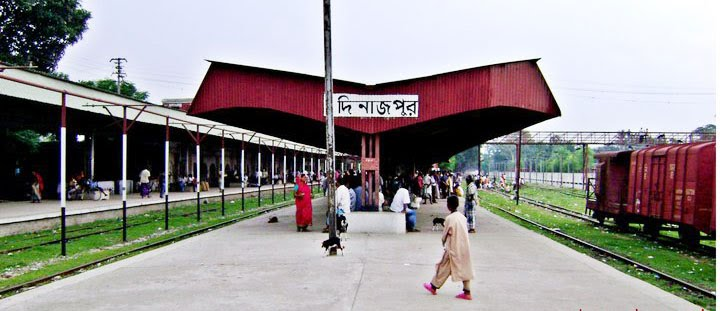
Dinajpur railway station

- Railway stations:
  1. Dinajpur railway station
  2. Chirirbandar railway station
  3. Biral railway station
  4. Hili railway station
  5. Parbatipur Junction railway station
  6. Fulbari railway station
  7. Birampur railway station
  8. Setabgonj railway station
  9. Kholahati railway station
- Roads & highways:
  1. Dinajpur - Dhaka Highway (via Fulbari, Birampur)
  2. Dinajpur - Dhaka Highway (via Rangpur)
  3. Dinajpur - Panchagarh
  4. Dinajpur - Rangpur Highway (via Parbatipur)
  5. Dinajpur - Thakurgaon Highway
  6. Dinajpur - Dakshin Dinajpur International Highway (India)

== Education ==
Educational institutions in the district include: 1 university, 118 colleges, 10 vocational institutes, 1 textile institute, 617 secondary school, 1713 primary schools, 11 community schools, 29 non-government schools, 10 kindergartens, 351 madrasas. Noted educational institutions are following:

=== Hajee Mohammad Danesh Science and Technology University ===
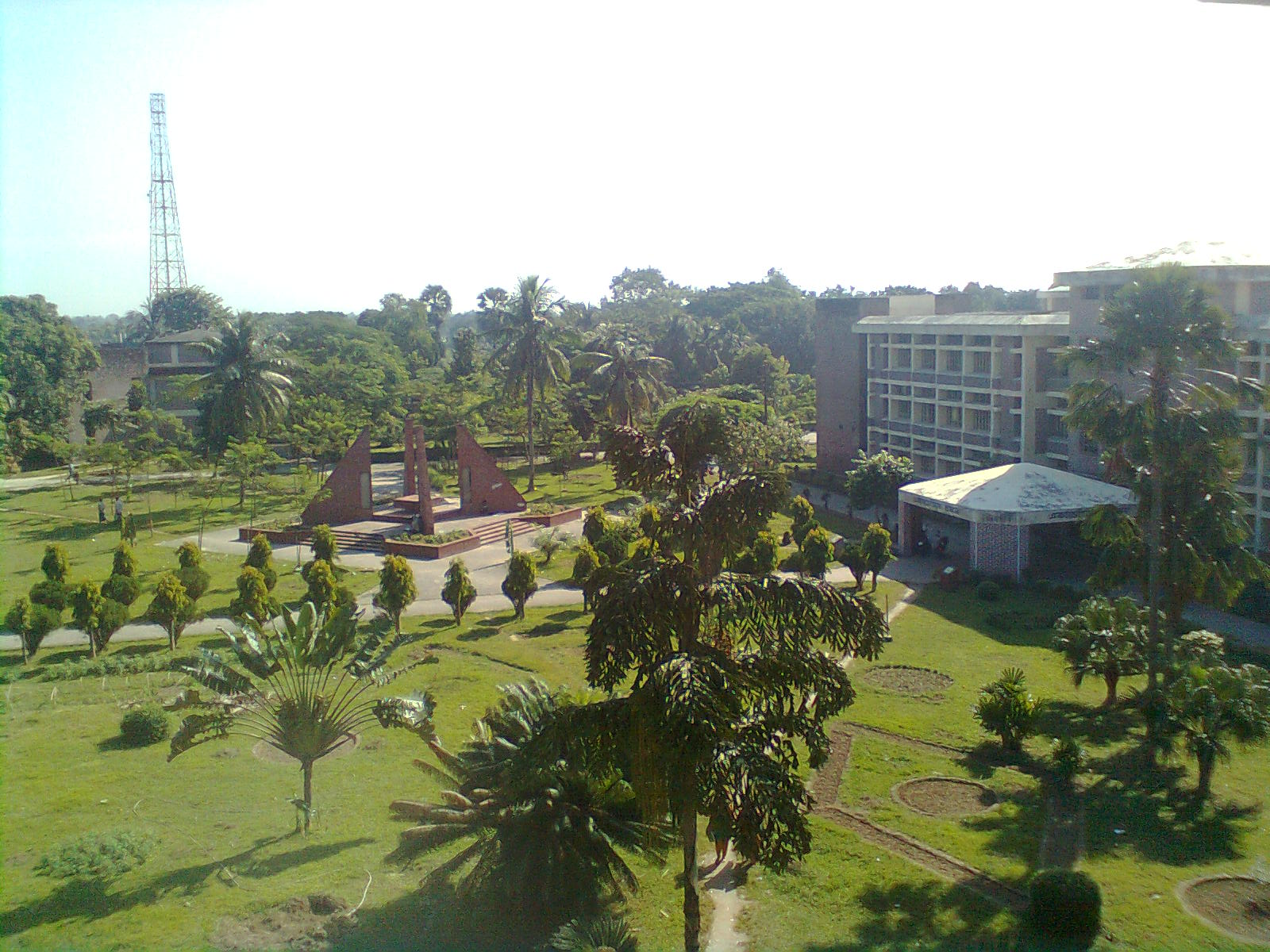
Hajee Mohammad Danesh Science and Technology University

Hajee Mohammad Danesh Science and Technology University is a government-financed public university of Bangladesh situated 10 kilometres (6.2 mi) from Dinajpur main town. It serves as an institution of science and technology in northern part of the country. Hajee Mohammad Danesh Science and Technology University was established as an Agricultural Extension Training Institute (AETI) to award a three-year diploma in agriculture. The AETI was later upgraded to Hajee Mohammad Danesh Agricultural College in 1988 having an affiliation with the Bangladesh Agricultural University, Mymensingh. Then the college was upgraded to the status of a university renaming it as Hajee Mohammad Danesh Science and Technology University. First batch of the students were admitted at that time (1999-2000 session). The act of the university was passed on 8 July 2001 in the Jatio Shongsad (National Assembly) was followed by a gazette notification on 8 April 2002.

=== Dinajpur Medical College and Hospital ===
It is a government medical college here, which is one of the 36 government funded medical colleges in Bangladesh. It is located in the town of Dinajpur. It admits 160 students into the f-year MBBS (Bachelor of Medicine and Bachelor of Surgery) degree program. There is a four-story building. There are two hostels for boys and three hostels for girls. There are four hostels for intern doctors. About twenty batches of students have passed from this medical college. Dinajpur Medical College Journal is recognised by the BMDC and is published twice a year (ISSN 2070-2019). The 500-bed hospital has high technology and has started to provide more services. There is also a well-developed nursing college behind the hospital building. The hospital has an ultrasound centre for nuclear medicine near Sadar Hospital, Dinajpur. Dinajpur Medical College Hospital now provides health services not only in the Dinajpur District but also to people from other districts near Dinajpur.

=== Dinajpur Zilla School ===
This district gives the opportunity to read in two Govt. schools, Dinajpur Zilla School (for boys only) and Dinajpur Govt. Girls' High School. Dinajpur Zilla School was established in 1854 during the British reign. It is located at the centre of the Dinajpur town. It owns a hostel too for residential facilities. This school is one of 20 schools in Bangladesh, which has a government funded "E-Learning" facility and E-Laboratory. There is Stone made Map of South Asia subcontinent in this school, which was made at 1934. It has a very talented Score in S.S.C participation. There is also an auditorium, a sculpture of celebrating the 150 years of the school, a mosque, an enhanced library and laboratory in this school.

=== Dinajpur polytechnic institute ===
Dinajpur polytechnic institute is located at south Balubari. This polytechnic was started with Civil and Power Technology in 1964.

There are three government colleges in the Dinajpur town. Dinajpur Government College, which was previously known as Surendranath college and Dinajpur City College are for both male and female students. Another government college is "Dinajpur Government Women's College" is for female students only. All colleges are operated under Bangladesh National University.

=== Others ===
The METI Handmade School, a primary school for 169 students located in Rudrapur in Dinajpur district, was built with the assistance of local craftsmen making use of traditional materials, primarily mud and bamboo. An example of sustainable architecture, the project received the Aga Khan Award for Architecture in 2007, not only for its simple, humane approach and beauty but also for the level of cooperation achieved between architects, craftsmen, clients and users. There is also a textile institute. Now RIDGE School is the most modern and British standard popular school of Dinajpur.

Dinajpur Central Shahid Minar is the 2nd largest Shahid minar in the country. Dinajpur Boasts a regional training centre of Bangladesh Krira Shiksha Pratisthan. Bangladesh Krira Shiksha Pratisthan situated at Basher hat near to HSTU campus. It aims to train and educate sports prodigy.

== Notable residents ==
- Heyat Mahmud (1693–1760), medieval poet
- Haji Mohammad Danesh – 1900–1986, politician and communist activist
- Narayan Gangopadhyay, a Bengali novelist, poet, essayist, and short story writer, and one of the leading writers of modern Bengali literature
- Atmasthananda, fifteenth president of the Ramakrishna Math and the Ramakrishna Mission
- Khurshid Jahan – 1939–2006, former Bangladeshi Minister of Women's and Children's affairs
- M. Yousuf Ali – , first Bangladeshi Minister of Education
- Muhammad Mahbubur Rahman – 9th Chief of Army Staff (abbreviated as CAS) of Bangladesh Army from May 1996 to December 1997, member of BNP's standing committee.
- M. Abdur Rahim – (21 November 1927 – 4 September 2016), Member of Parliament, member of the constitution drafting committee and an organiser of the independence war
- Abdullah Al Kafi – (1945–2005), Member of Parliament for Dinajpur-1
- Moinuddin Ahmed Chowdhury – 1921–1998, prominent East Pakistani politician
- Subhash Dutta – (9 February 1930 – 16 November 2012), filmmaker, theatre and film actor
- Nitun Kundu, founder of OTOBI furniture groupe and designer of the fountain of SAARC fountain in front of Hotel Sonargaon
- Dhiman Ghosh, cricketer
- Liton Das, cricketer
- Lucas Marandi, Roman Catholic Bishop
- Hemanta Vincent Biswas, footballer
- Mojibur Rahman Jony, footballer
- M. S. Bablu, footballer

== See also ==
- Districts of Bangladesh
- Divisions of Bangladesh
- Upazilas of Bangladesh
- Rangpur Division
- Administrative geography of Bangladesh
