= Md. Atiur Rahman =

Bangladeshi politician

Member of the Bangladesh Parliament for Dinajpur-11
- In office 2 April 1979 – 24 March 1982
- Preceded by: Constituency Established
- Succeeded by: Constituency Dissolved

Member of the Bangladesh Parliament for Dinajpur-6
- In office 19 March 1996 – 30 March 1996
- Preceded by: Azizur Rahman Chowdhury
- Succeeded by: Md. Mostafizur Rahman Fizu

Personal details
- Born: 27 November 1939 Hasar Para, Nawabganj thana, British India
- Died: November 13, 2013 (aged 73)
- Party: Bangladesh Nationalist Party
- Education: Rajshahi University

Md. Atiur Rahman (1939 – 2013) was a Bangladeshi academic and politician from Dinajpur belonging to the Bangladesh Nationalist Party. He was a member of the Jatiya Sangsad.

== Biography ==
Atiur Rahman was born on 27 November 1939 in Hasar Para village of what is now Nawabganj Upazila, Dinajpur, Bangladesh. He received a postgraduate degree in English from Rajshahi University in 1962. He was the principal of Dinajpur Government Women's College, Syedpur Cantonment Public College, Jalalabad Cantonment Public College and Bogra Cantonment Public College. In 1978 he resigned from his job and joined politics.

Atiur Rahman was elected as a member of the Jatiya Sangsad from Dinajpur-11 in the second general election of Bangladesh. Later, he was elected as a member of the Jatiya Sangsad from Dinajpur-6 in the sixth Jatiya Sangsad election.

Atiur Rahman died on 13 November 2013.
