= Md. Mostafizur Rahman Fizu =

Bangladeshi politician

Md. Mostafizur Rahmann Fizu

Member of Parliament for Dinajpur-6
- In office 14 July 1996 – 13 July 2001
- Preceded by: Md. Atiur Rahman
- Succeeded by: Azizur Rahman Chowdhury

Personal details
- Died: 2006
- Political party: Bangladesh Awami League
- Relatives: Shibli Sadique (son)

Md. Mostafizur Rahman Fizu (died 2006) was a Bangladeshi politician from Dinajpur belonging to Bangladesh Awami League. He was a member of the Jatiya Sangsad.

== Biography ==
Fizu was a cofounder of Swapnapuri which was established in 1989. He was elected as a member of the Jatiya Sangsad from Dinajpur-6 in the June 1996 Bangladeshi general election. His son Shibli Sadique is the MP of this constituency as of 2019.

Fizu died in 2006.
