= Abdus Sattar Chowdhury =

Bangladeshi politician

- আব্দুস সাত্তার চৌধুরী

Member of the Bangladesh Parliament for Dinajpur-6
- In office 1988–1990
- Preceded by: Zafar Muhammad Lutfar
- Succeeded by: Azizur Rahman Chowdhury

Personal details
- Born: Dinajpur District
- Party: Jatiya Party

Abdus Sattar Chowdhury is a politician from the Dinajpur District of Bangladesh and an elected a member of parliament from Dinajpur-6.

== Career ==
Chowdhury was elected to parliament from Dinajpur-6 as an independent candidate in 1988.
