= A. Z. M. Zahid Hossain =

Bangladeshi politician and physician

- এ জেড এম জাহিদ হোসেন
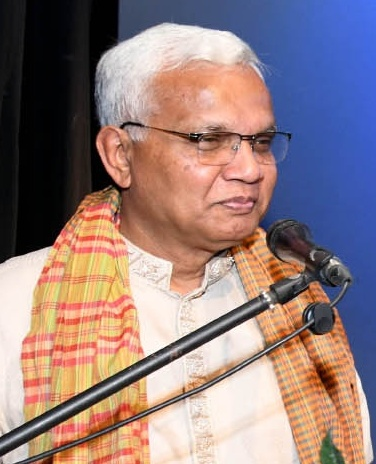
- Hossain in 2026

Minister of Social Welfare
- Incumbent
- Assumed office 17 February 2026
- Prime Minister: Tarique Rahman
- Preceded by: Sharmeen Murshid

Minister of Women and Children Affairs
- Incumbent
- Assumed office 17 February 2026
- Prime Minister: Tarique Rahman
- Preceded by: Sharmeen Murshid

Member of Parliament
- Incumbent
- Assumed office 17 February 2026
- Preceded by: Shibli Sadique
- Constituency: Dinajpur-6

Personal details
- Born: Abu Zafar Md. Zahid Hossain; 25 December 1960 (age 65) Gafargaon, Mymensingh, East Pakistan
- Party: Bangladesh Nationalist Party
- Spouse: Dr. Sharifa Karim Sharna (marriage date unknown)
- Education: Mymensingh Medical College

Abu Zafar Md. Zahid Hossain (born 25 December 1960) is a Bangladeshi politician and physician. He is the incumbent Minister for women, children affairs and Social welfare. He is the incumbent Jatiya Sangsad member representing the Dinajpur-6 constituency since February 2026.

Hossain is the national standing committee member and vice-chairman of the Bangladesh Nationalist Party. Previously he served as the general secretary of Bangladesh Medical Association and Doctors Association of Bangladesh. He was the personal doctor of Khaleda Zia.

== Early life and education ==
Zahid Hossain was born on 25 December 1960, in Gafargaon, Mymensingh. His ancestral home is in Putimara Union, Nawabganj Upazila, Dinajpur district.

Hossain completed his HSC from Ananda Mohan College and obtained his MBBS degree from Mymensingh Medical College in 1983. He obtained his FCPS degree from Bangladesh College of Physicians and Surgeons in 1997, his MS degree in urology from Dhaka University in 2001, his FCPS from College of Physicians and Surgeons Pakistan in 2004, and his FRCP fellowship from Royal College of Physicians, Edinburgh, UK in 2006. He is married to Dr. Sharifa Karim Sharna who also completed her MBBS and MPh.

== Career ==
Hossain joined the politics of the nationalist Chhatra Dal while studying at Mymensingh Medical College. Later, he served as the secretary general of the Doctors Association of Bangladesh (DAB), a pro-BNP doctors' organization, and the United Professionals Council. Then he was made personal physician of Khaleda Zia. He also served as a professor of urology at Bangladesh Medical University.

On 16 August 2024, Hossain was made national standing committee member of Bangladesh Nationalist Party (BNP).
