= Salma Akter =

Salma Akter সালমা আক্তার
- Born: Moushumi Akter Salma; 15 January
- Genres: Lalon Geeti, Palli Geeti
- Instrument: Vocal
- Years active: 2006–present
- Spouses: Shibli Sadique (m. 2011; div. 2016) Sanaullah Nur Sagar (m. 2018; div. 2025)

Moushumi Akter Salma (born 15 January), commonly known as Salma Akter, is a Bangladeshi folk singer. She rose to fame in 2006 after winning the second season of "Closeup 1 Tomakei Khujchhey Bangladesh", a television series broadcast on NTV.

== Early life ==
Salma was born in the village of Gangarampur, Daulatpur Upazila, Kushtia District, Khulna Division.

== Music career ==
Salma grew up hearing Lalon songs sung by her father, Fazlul Haque, who took part in local folk music gatherings. She later trained under the Baul singer Shafi Mandal, then a music teacher at the Daulatpur Upazila Shilpakala Academy.

In 2006, at the age of twelve, Salma became the winner of the second season of the reality television show Closeup One—Tomakei Khujchhe Bangladesh.

Salma has released a number of records. Her song "O Mor Baniya Bondhu Re", which she sang during Closeup One, became widely popular.

Salma performs Bengali folk songs, such as the works by the 18th century mystic Lalon, as well as modern Bengali songs.

Salma has also performed internationally.

In January 2020 she released the single "Panjor", composed by Ziauddin Alam. In November 2025 she released "Bondhu Ki Montrona Jane Re", a duet with Sajib Shan written and composed by Dewan Jasim. Her other recent releases include "Dil Diwana", "Barbad", "Mayar Jadu Korla Ei Mone", "Moner Gohine", "Sanai", "Jadure Modhure" and "Emon Bhalobasha Chai Na". In August 2026 she recorded "Kunje Ar Bhalo Lage Na Bondhu Bihone", written and composed by her teacher Shafi Mandal, for release during Durga Puja.

== Personal life ==
In 2011, Salma married Shibli Sadique, a businessman and later served as a Jatiya Sangsad member representing the Dinajpur-6 constituency. The couple has a daughter, Sneha (aged 14). They got divorced in November 2016. On 31 December 2018, she married a British expat Sanaullah Nur Sagar. Her second daughter is Safia Noor (aged 7). The second marriage ended on 29 November 2025.

== Discography ==
Solo Albums
Album	Year
Baniya Bondhu	2006
Bondhu Aiyo Aiyo	2007
Poraner Bondhu	2008
Matir Tara	2009
Bondhu Ailana	2010
Binodini	2010
Brindabon	2011
Premer Janaza	2012
Shopno Uraila	2015
Anuraager Ghorey	2016
Mon Majhi	2017
Rongila Baroi	2020
Noya Daman	2021

=== Selected singles ===
- "Panjor" (2020)
- "Bondhu Ki Montrona Jane Re" (with Sajib Shan, 2025)
- "Dil Diwana"
- "Barbad"
- "Mayar Jadu Korla Ei Mone"
- "Moner Gohine"
- "Sanai"
- "Jadure Modhure"
- "Emon Bhalobasha Chai Na"
