= Ramsagar National Park =

National park in Dinajpur, Bangladesh

- IUCN category IV (habitat/species management area)
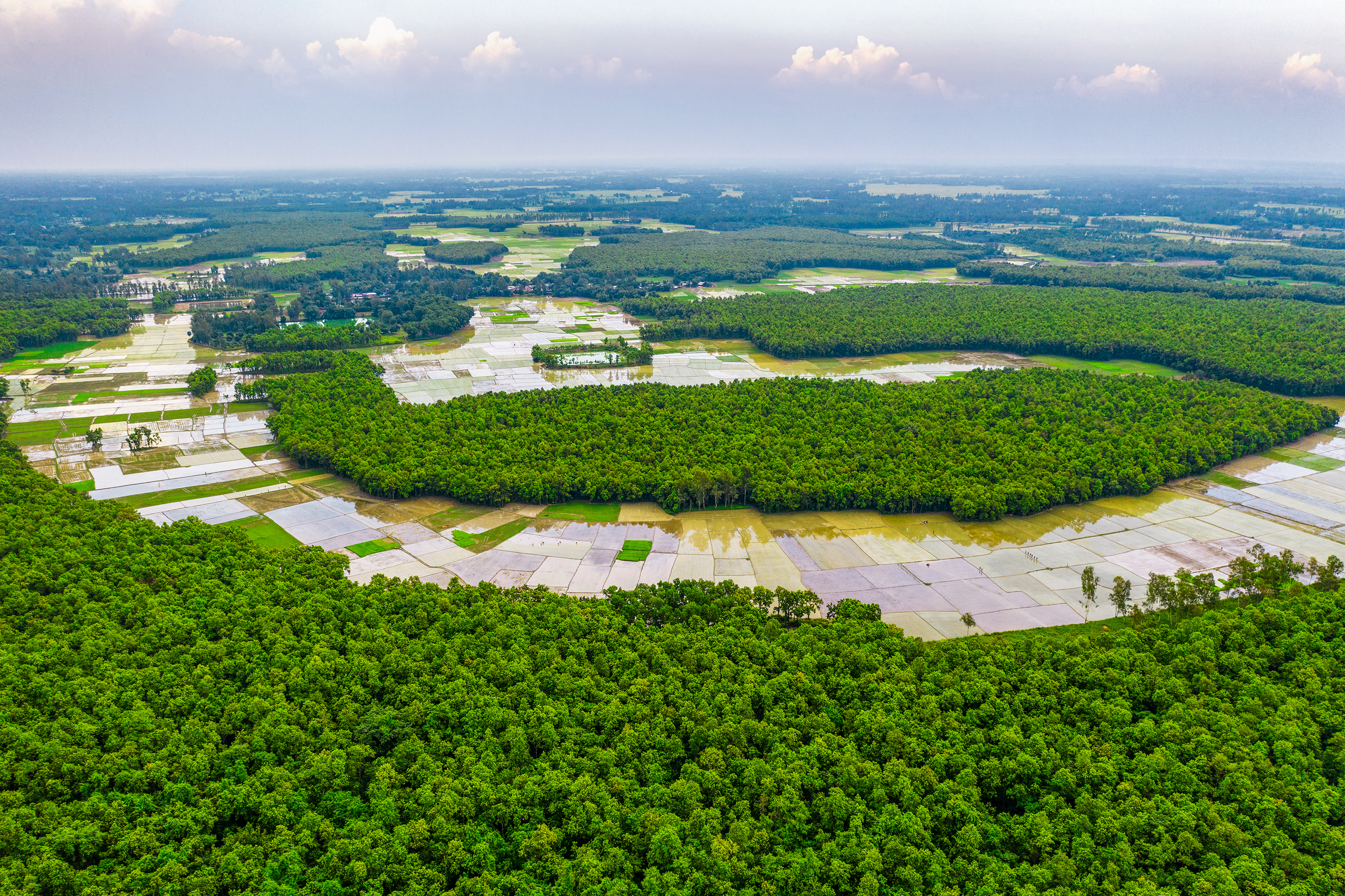
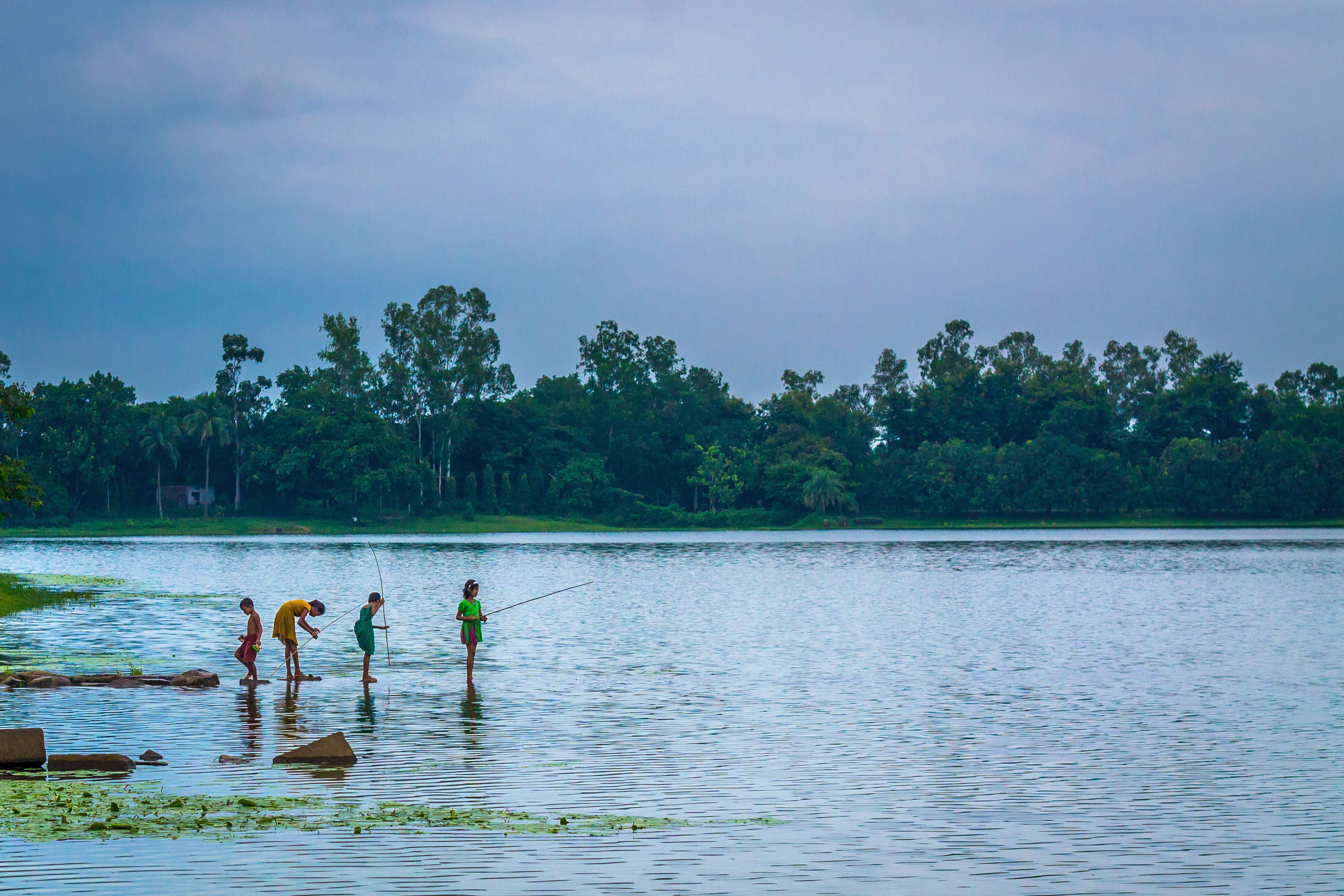
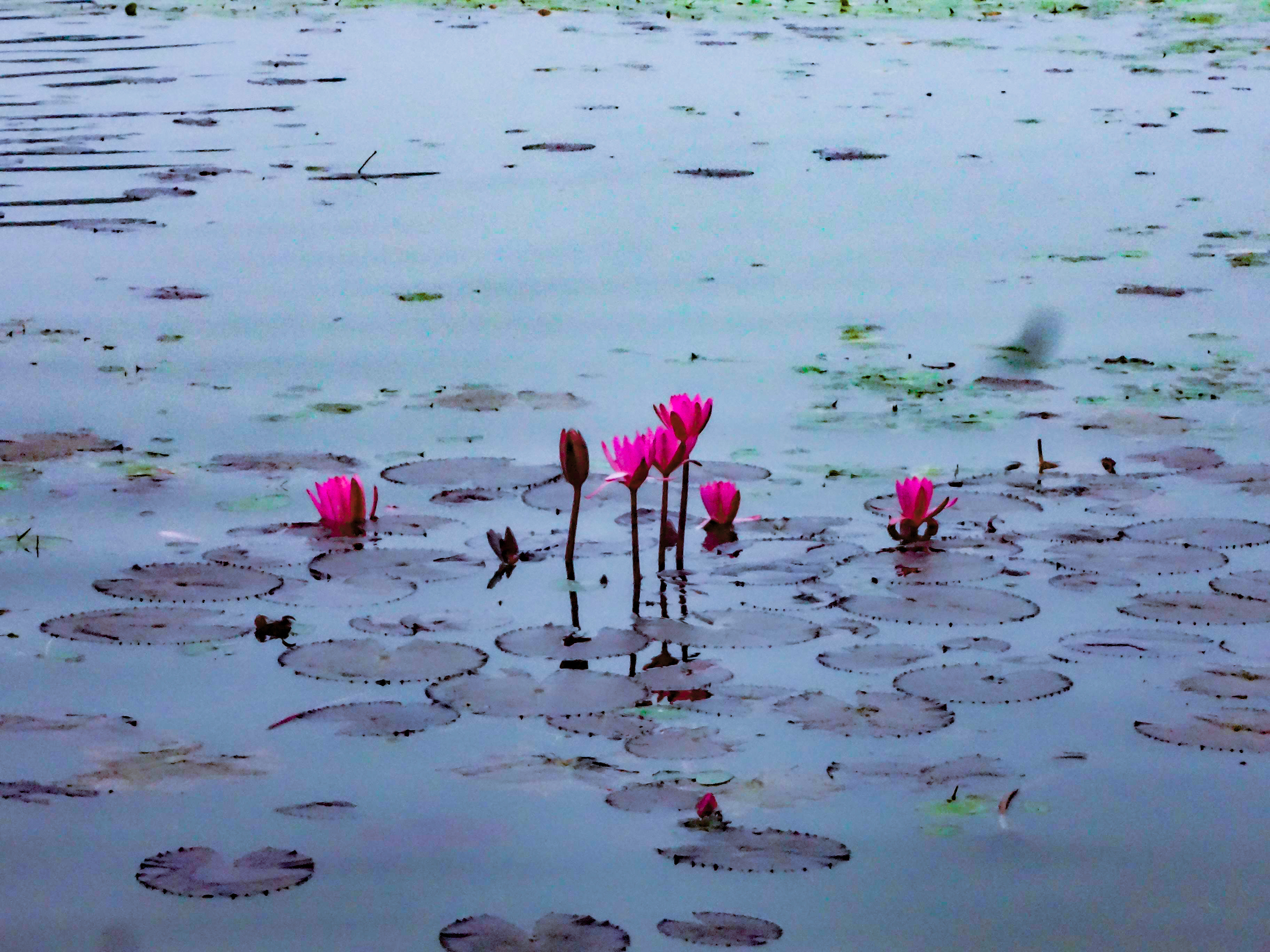
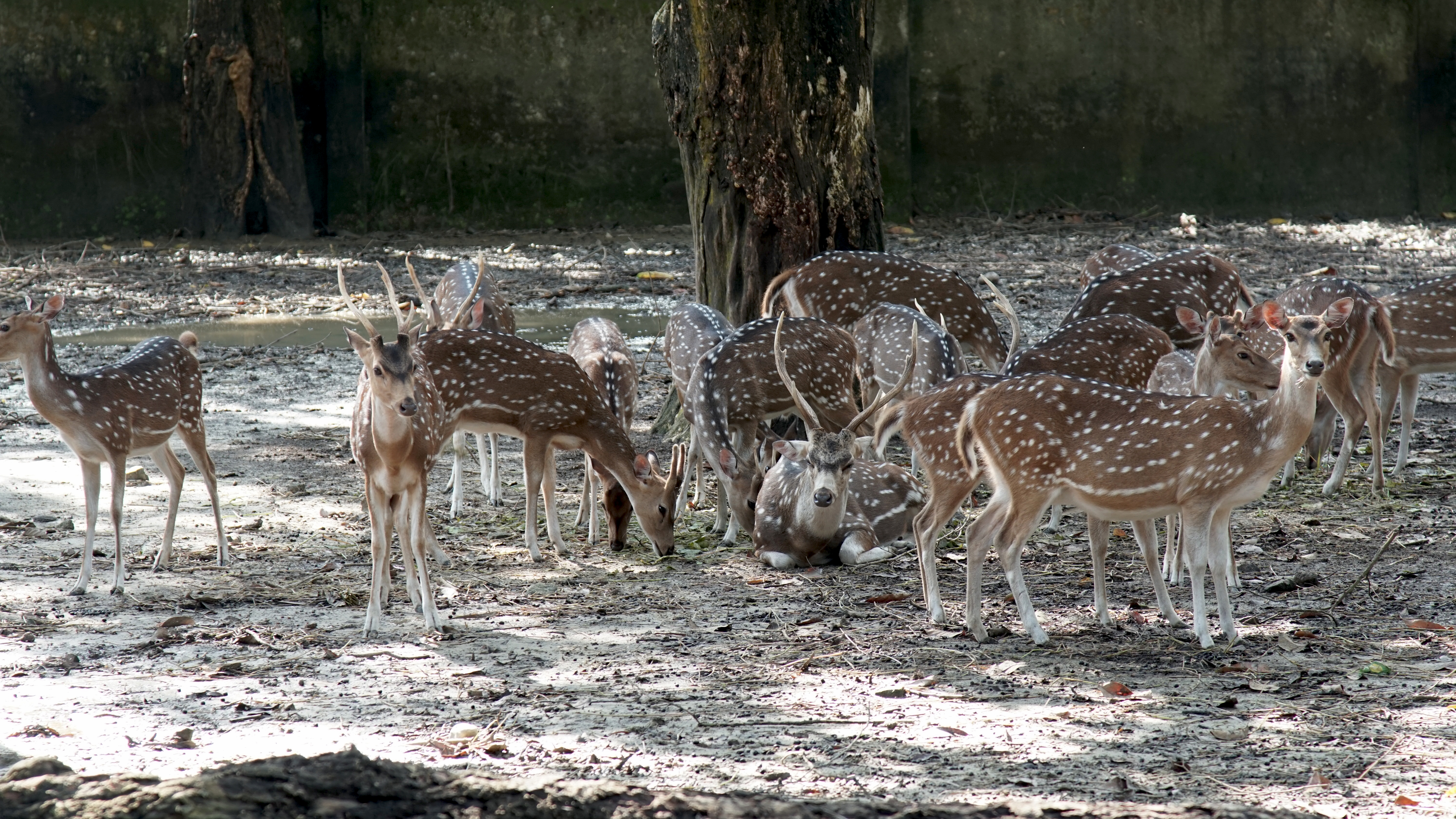
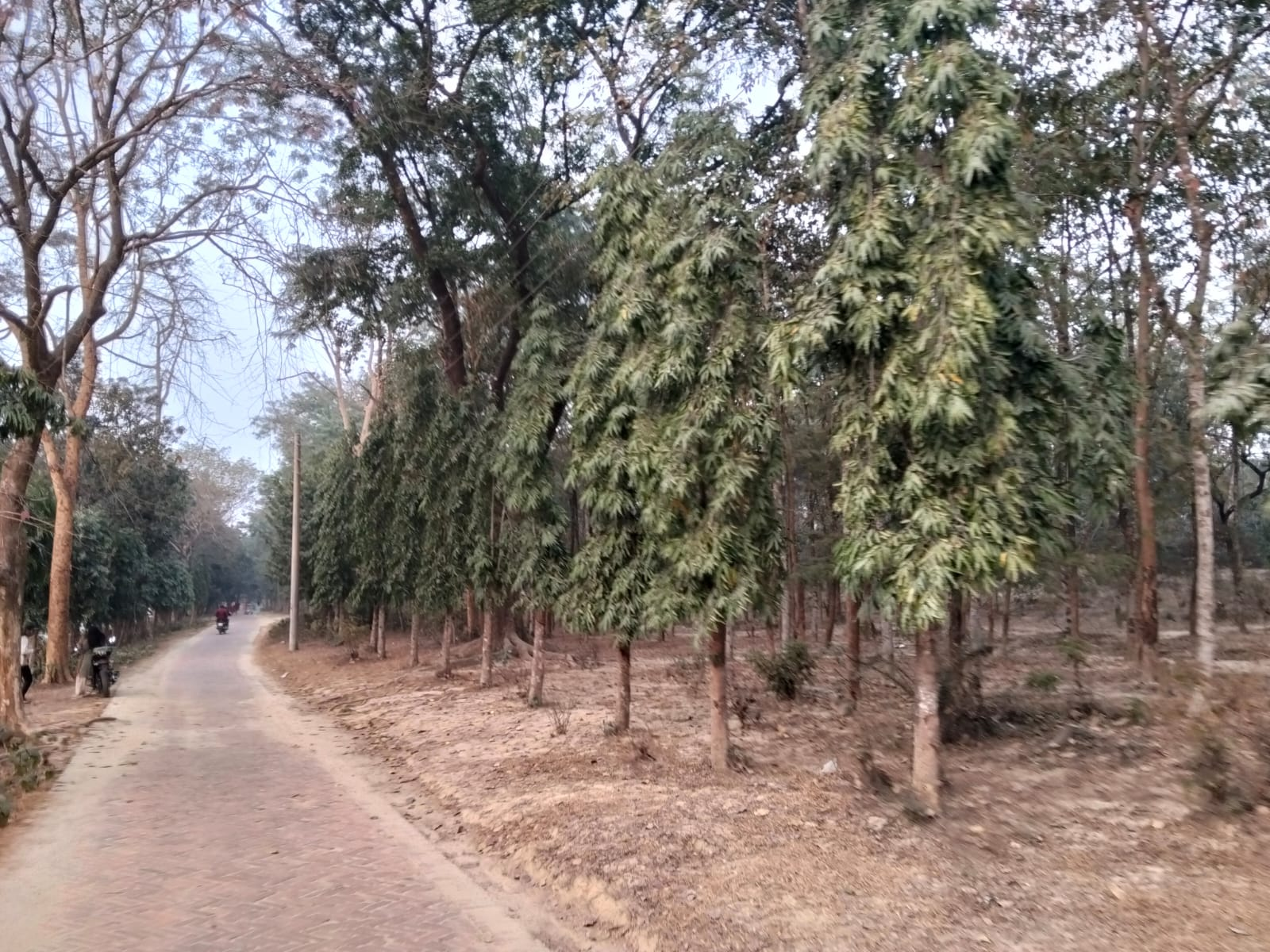
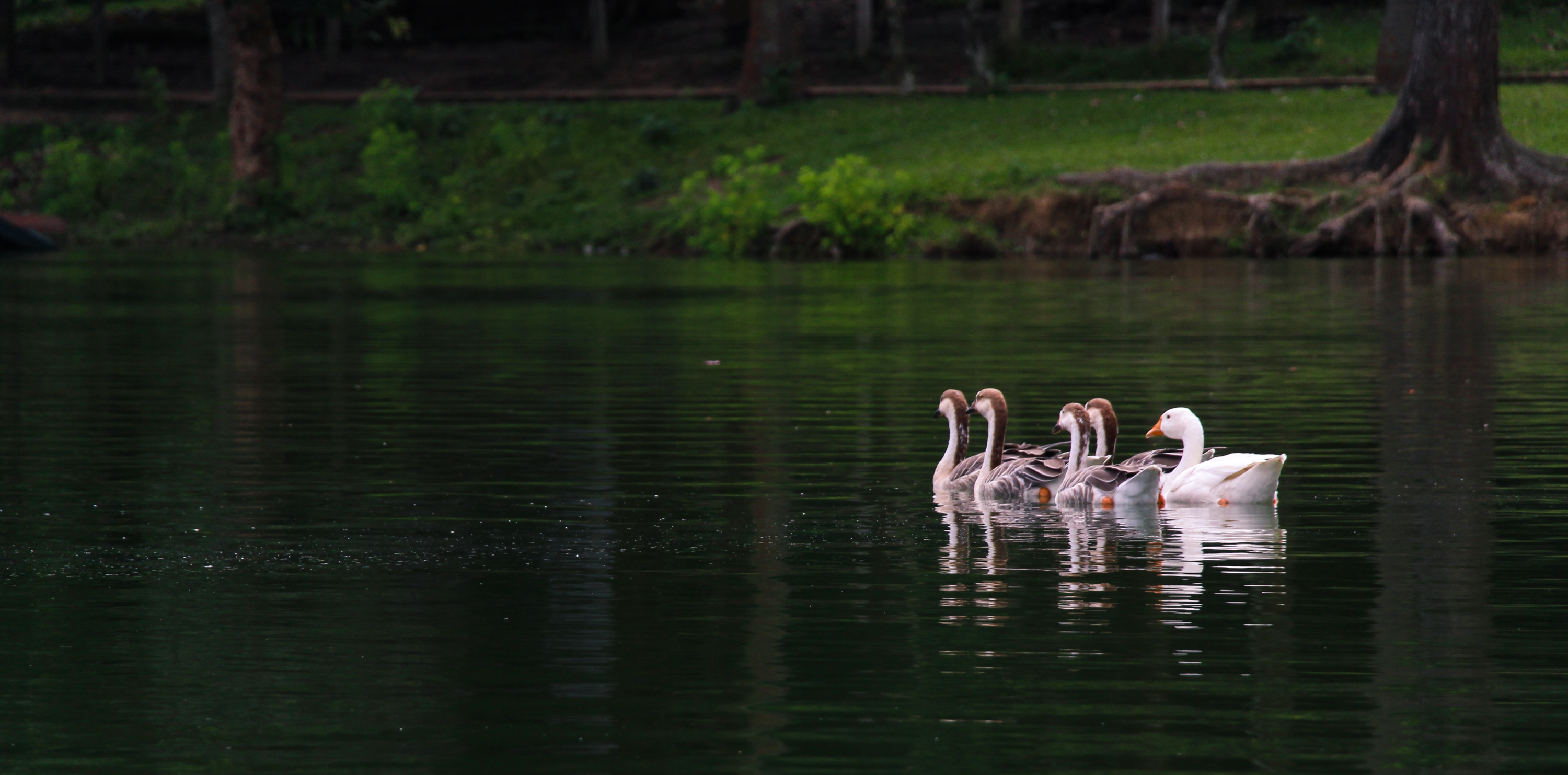

- Location within Bangladesh
- Location: Tajpur, Sadar Upazila, Dinajpur, Bangladesh
- Nearest city: Dinajpur
- Coordinates: 25°33′17″N 88°37′24″E
- Area: 27.75 ha (68.6 acres)
- Established: 30 April 2001

Ramsagar National Park (Bengali: রামসাগর জাতীয় উদ্যান) is a national park in Bangladesh located at Tajpur, near Dinajpur in the northwest of the country. The park is 27.76 hectare, in size, and is built around a large water reservoir known as Ramsagar. The lake is 1079m in length and 192.6m in width. The soil is red-yellow clay.

== History ==
It is believed that the lake of Ramsagar was excavated by Raja Ramnath, the Maharaja of Dinajpur, after whom the lake is named after, in the 18th century, before the Battle of Plassey. The tank was dug by 15 million workers at a cost of 30,000 Taka.

The park was first established in 1960 and was earlier recommended that the park be developed as class-B national park for recreation and education by the Government of East Pakistan in 1971. It was declared as national park on 30 April 2001 under the Bangladesh wildlife (Preservation) Amendment Act, 1947.

== Management ==
The park is managed by 8 staff members which include 1 forest officers, 3 gardeners, 3 forest guards and 1 watchman.

== Flora and fauna ==
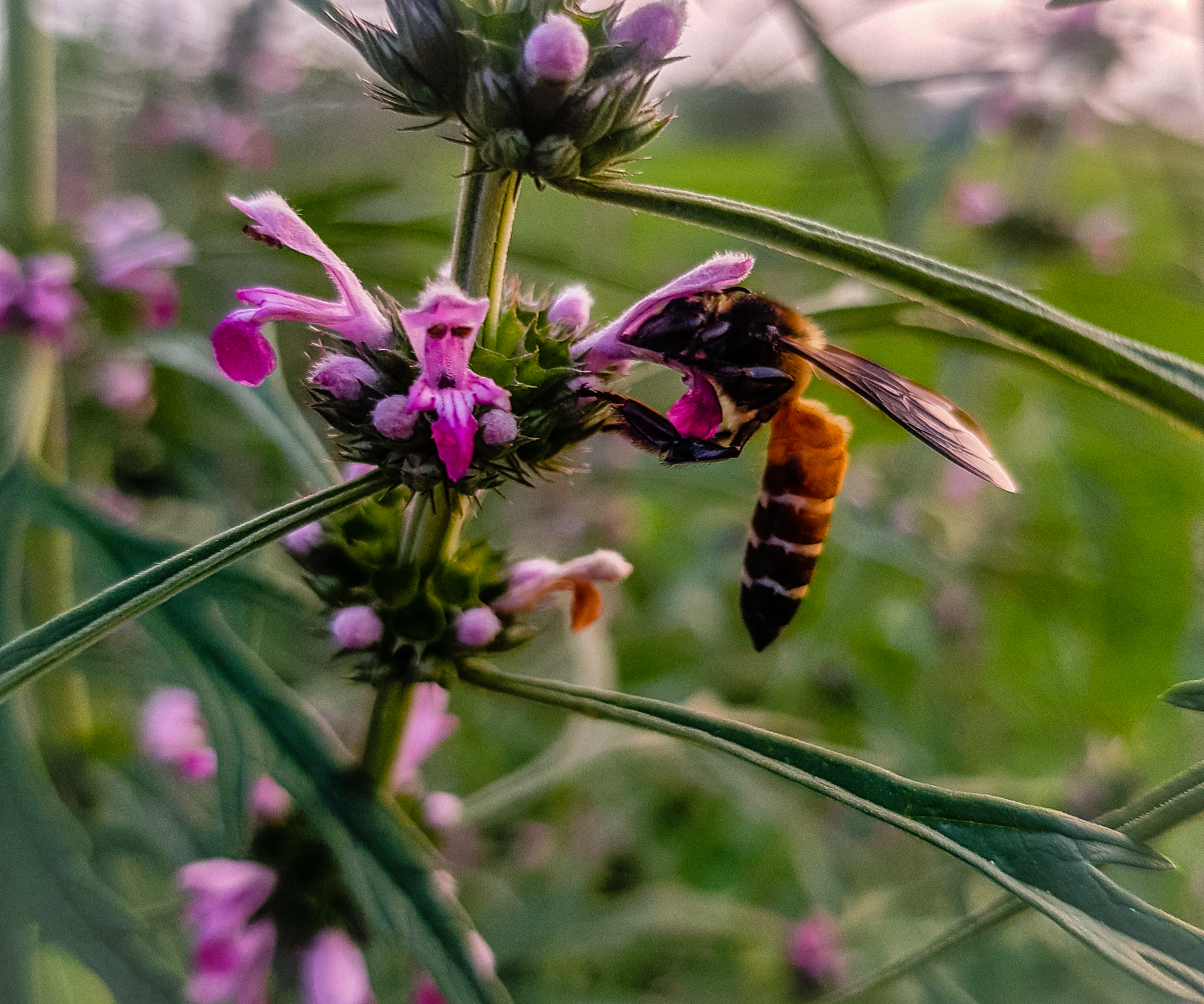
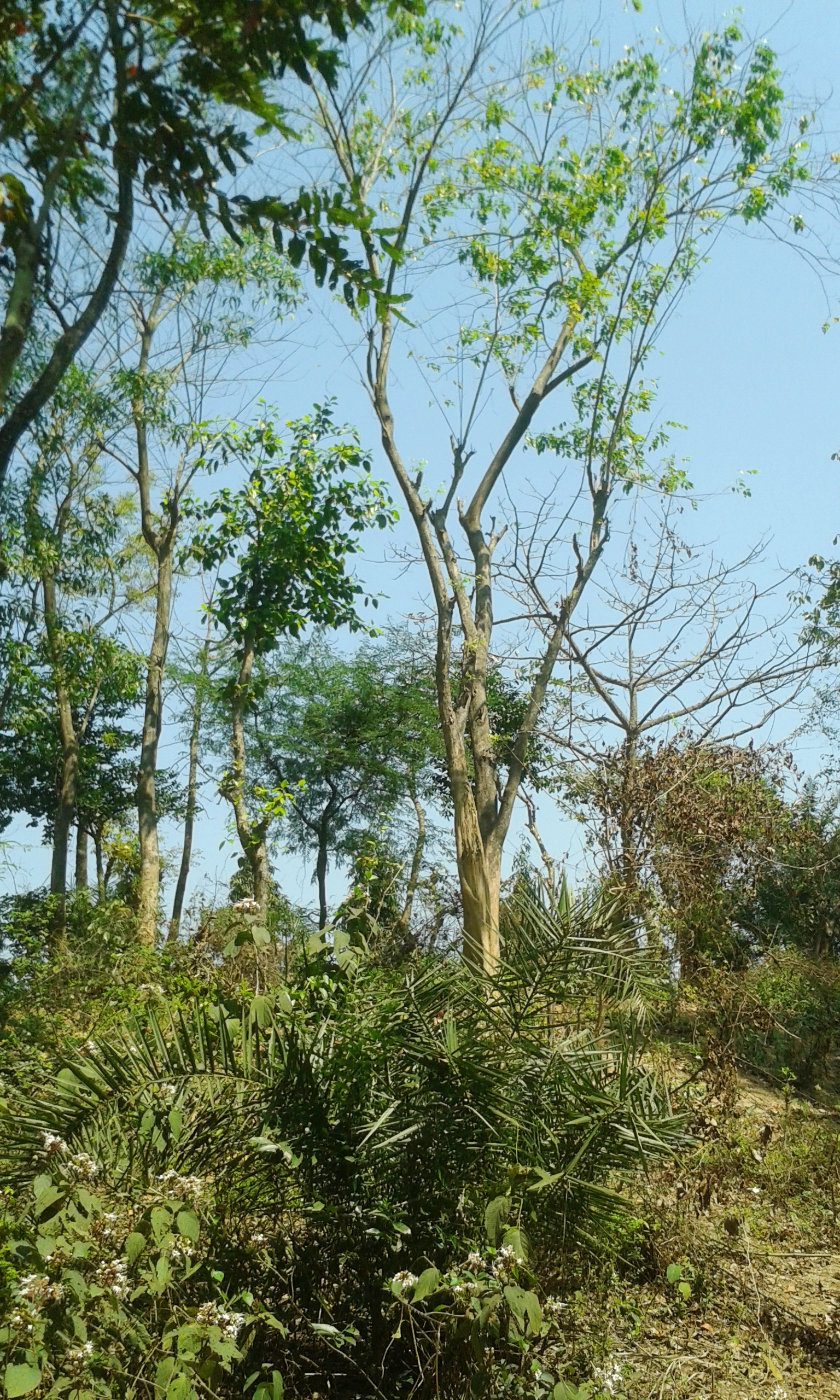
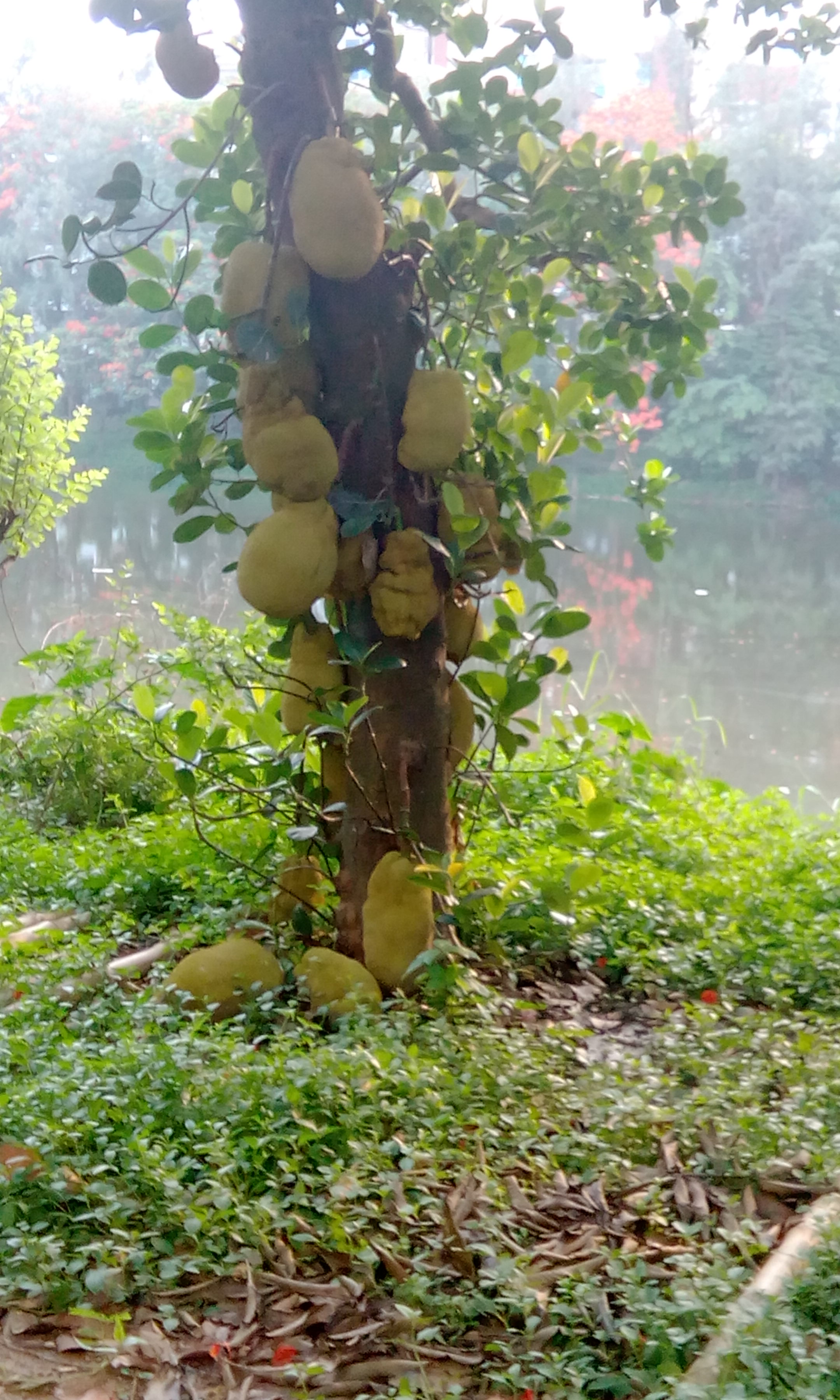
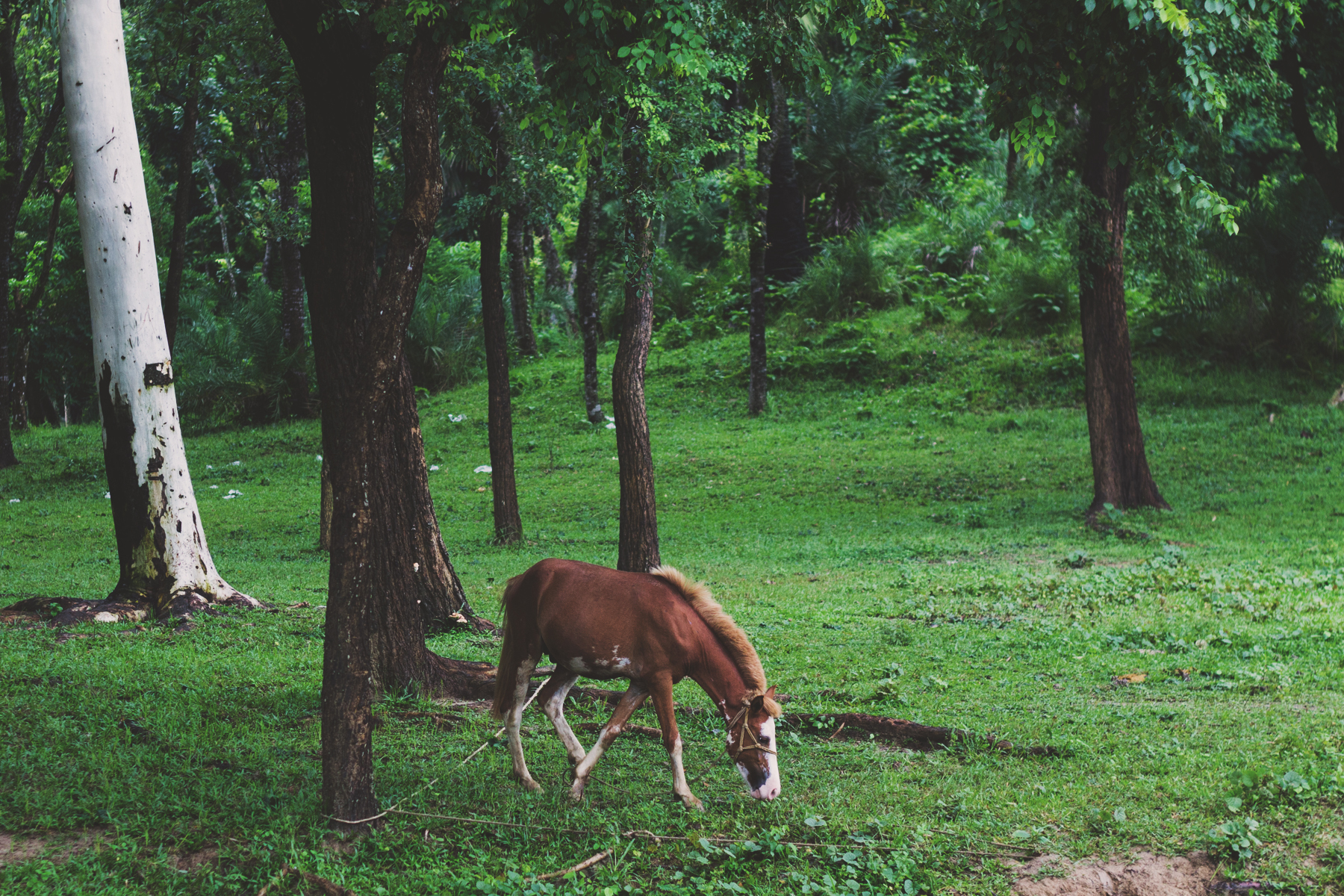
Flora and fauna of Ramsagar National Park

There are no big trees; the park consists of a big lake surrounded by embankments. Most of the flora and fauna are associated with wetland ecosystem.

=== Flora ===
272 plant species belonging to 132 families were recorded in this sanctuary. Mangifera indica, Syzygium cumini, Tamarindus indica, and Semecarpus anacardium are some of the trees found in the sanctuary.

=== Fauna ===
The lake is full of different types of fishes. There are turtles and snakes in the lake. The animals found here are Bengal fox, golden jackal, fishing cat and jungle cat. The water birds mainly consists of white-breasted waterhen, jacanas, river tern, kingfishers, ringed plover, grey heron and purple heron are found here. The extinct animals of this park are Indian tiger, Indian leopard, Indian rhinoceros, Indian sloth bear, Indian elephant, nilgai, Indian pangolin, Indian peafowl and many more.

== Threats ==
The plants inside the park are removed by the local villagers for food, fodder, making furniture, medicine and fuel. There is a decrease in the indigenous fish species due to overexploitation. The other factors affecting the biodiversity of the park are agricultural pollution, siltation, diseases and floods.

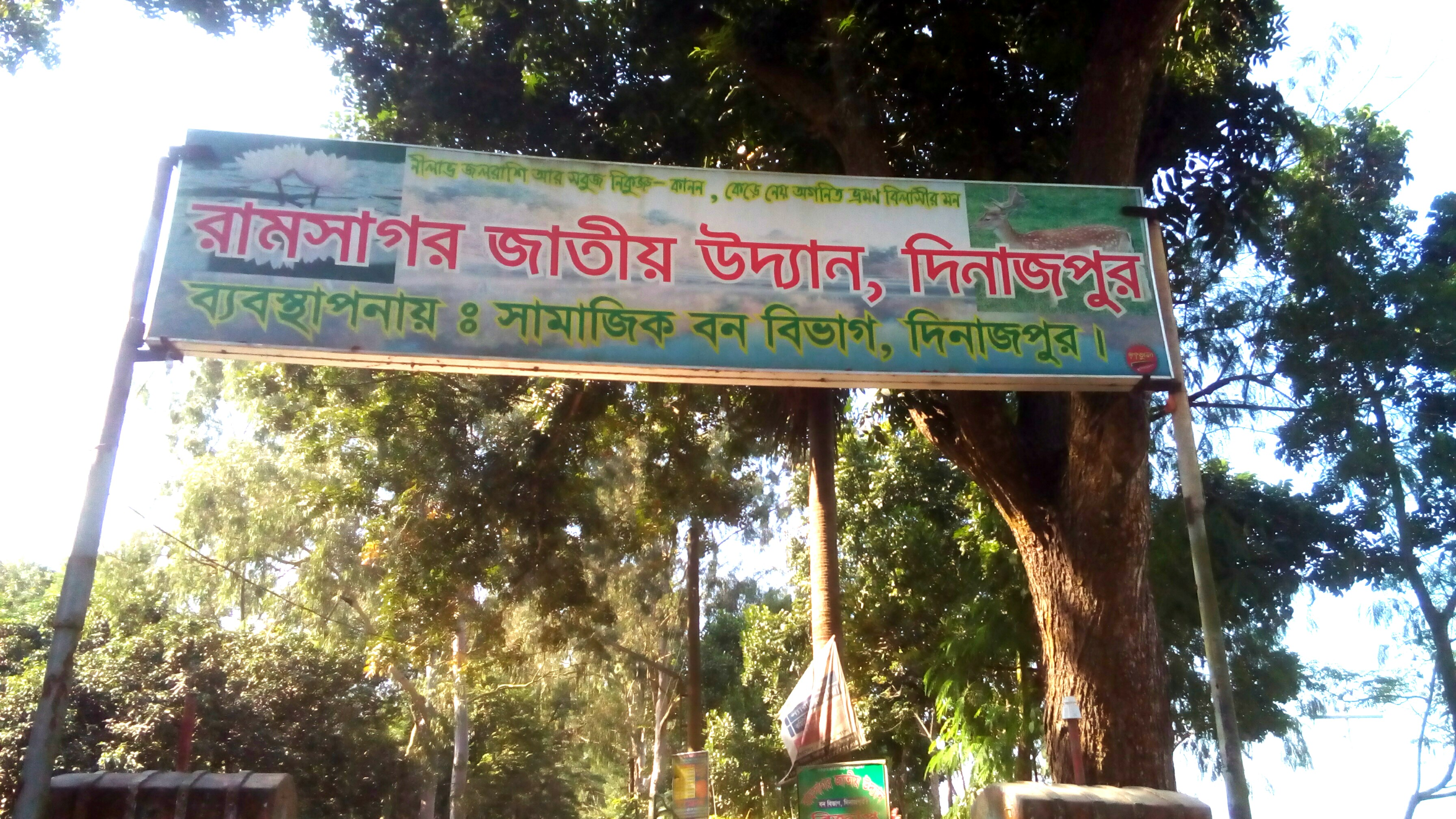
Main entrance

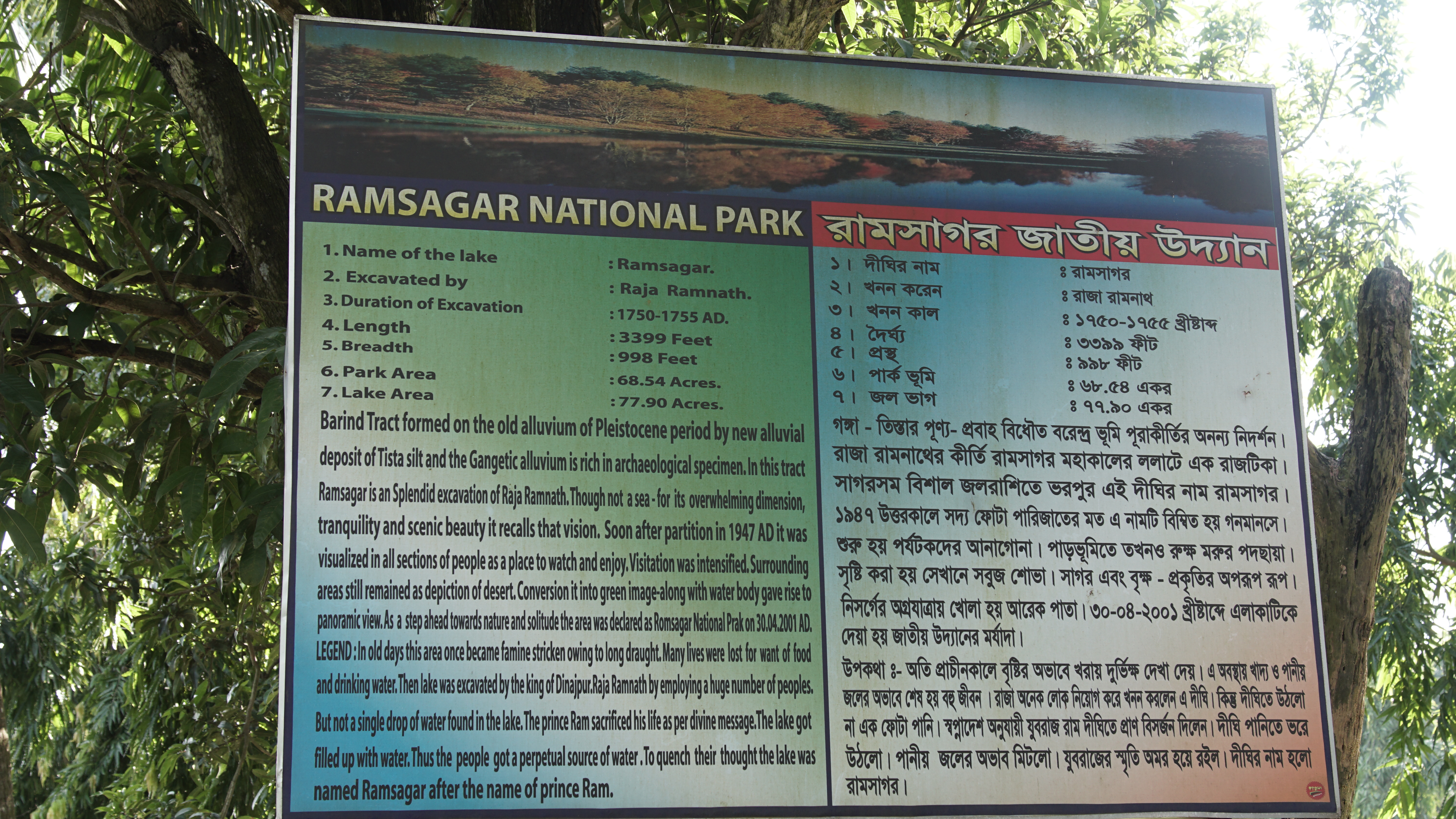
Introduction board

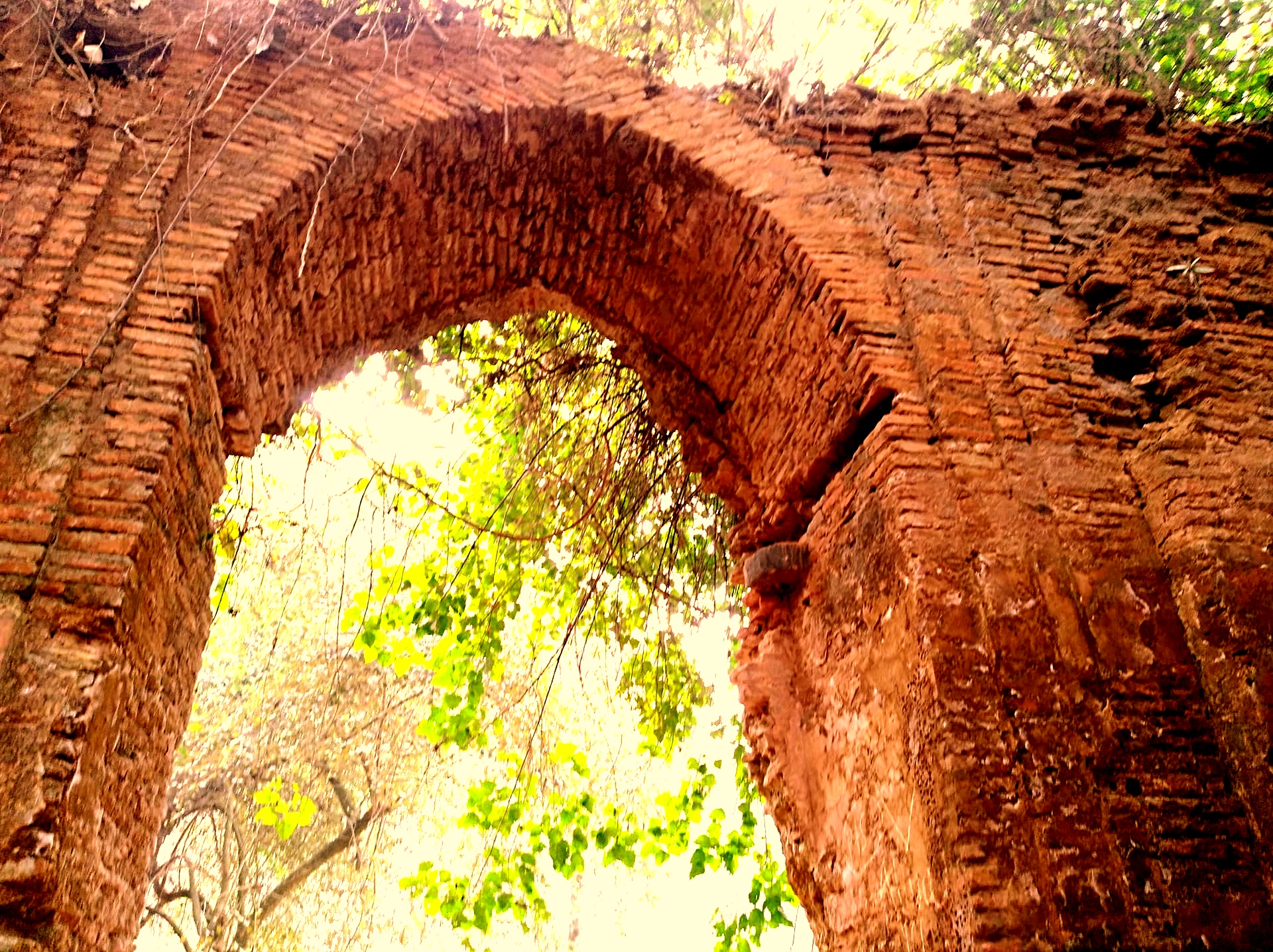
Ruins of royal palace

== See also ==
- List of protected areas of Bangladesh
- Nawabganj National Park, also located in Dinajpur District
