= Shibli Sadeeq =

Bangladeshi politician

- শিবলী সাদিক

Member of the Bangladesh Parliament for Dinajpur-6
- In office 29 January 2014 – 6 August 2024
- Preceded by: Azizul Haque Choudhury
- Succeeded by: A. Z. M. Zahid Hossain

Personal details
- Born: 28 August 1982 (age 44)
- Party: Bangladesh Awami League
- Spouse: Salma Akhter (m. 2011–2016)
- Children: 1
- Parent: Md. Mostafizur Rahman Fizu (father)

Shibli Sadeeq (Bengali: শিবলী সাদিক; born 28 August 1982) is an Awami League politician and a former Jatiya Sangsad member representing the Dinajpur-6 constituency during 2014–2024. His father, Md. Mostafizur Rahman Fizu, also represented Dinajpur-6 in the Jatiya Sangsad.

== Career ==
Sadique was elected to Parliament on 5 January 2014 from Dinajpur-6 as a Bangladesh Awami League candidate.

== Personal life ==
Sadique married folk singer Salma Akhter on 25 January 2011. They got separated in 2016. They have a daughter, Sneha.
