= Azizul Haque Choudhury =

Bangladeshi politician

- আজিজুল হক চৌধুরী

Member of Parliament
- In office 2008–2014
- Preceded by: Azizur Rahman Chowdhury
- Succeeded by: Shibli Sadique

Personal details
- Political party: Bangladesh Awami League

Azizul Haque Choudhury is a Bangladesh Awami League politician and former Member of Parliament from Dinajpur-6.

== Career ==
Choudhury was elected to Parliament in 2008 from Dinajpur-6 as a Bangladesh Awami League candidate. In 2009, he was criticized by local officials for using his influence to appoint fertilizer traders.
