= Golam Rahman Shah =

Bangladeshi politician

Member of Bangladesh Parliament
- In office 1979–1986
- Preceded by: Mohammed Yusuf Ali
- Succeeded by: Zafar Muhammad Lutfar

Personal details
- Born: 31 December 1938 Goaldihi, Khansama thana, British India
- Political party: Bangladesh Awami League

Golam Rahman Shah is a Bangladesh Awami League politician and a former member of parliament for Dinajpur-6.

== Biography ==
Golam Rahman Shah was born on 31 December 1938 in Goaldihi village of what is now Khansama Upazila, Dinajpur District, Bangladesh.

Shah was elected to parliament from Dinajpur-6 as a Bangladesh Awami League candidate in 1979.
