= Dinajpur-6 =

Bangladeshi parliamentary constituency

Coordinates: 25.42°N 89.08°E

- Constituency for the Jatiya Sangsad
- District: Dinajpur District
- Division: Rangpur Division
- Electorate: 557,692 (2026)

Current constituency
- Created: 1973
- Party: Bangladesh Nationalist Party
- Member: A. Z. M. Zahid Hossain
- ← 10 Dinajpur-5 12 Nilphamari-1 →

Dinajpur-6 is a constituency represented in the Jatiya Sangsad (National Parliament) of Bangladesh since 2026 by A. Z. M. Zahid Hossain of the Bangladesh Nationalist Party.

== Boundaries ==
The constituency encompasses Birampur, Ghoraghat, Hakimpur and Nawabganj upazilas.

== History ==
The constituency was created for the first general elections in newly independent Bangladesh, which was held in 1973.

== Members of Parliament ==
Election	Member	Party
1973	Mohammed Yusuf Ali	Awami League
1979	Golam Rahman Shah	Awami League
Major Boundary Changes
1986	Zafar Muhammad Lutfar	National Awami Party
1988	Abdus Sattar Chowdhury	Jatiya Party
1991	Azizur Rahman Chowdhury	Bangladesh Jamaat-e-Islami
Feb 1996	Md. Atiur Rahman	Bangladesh Nationalist Party
Jun 1996	Md. Mostafizur Rahman Fizu	Awami League
2001	Azizur Rahman Chowdhury	Bangladesh Jamaat-e-Islami
2008	Azizul Haque Choudhury	Awami League
2014	Shibli Sadique	Awami League
2018	Shibli Sadique	Awami League
2024	Shibli Sadique	Awami League
2026	A. Z. M. Zahid Hossain	Bangladesh Nationalist Party

== Elections ==
=== Elections in the 2020s ===
General election 2026: Dinajpur-6
Party	Candidate	Votes	%	±%
BNP	A. Z. M. Zahid Hossain			
Jamaat	Md. Anowarul Islam			
Majority				
Turnout				
Registered electors		557,692		
BNP gain from AL				

=== Elections in the 2010s ===
General Election 2014: Dinajpur-6
Party	Candidate	Votes	%	±%
AL	Shibli Sadique	115,036	97.0	+57.9
WPB	Rabindranata Saren	3,499	3.0	N/A
Majority		111,537	94.1	+93.8
Turnout		118,535	28.7	−62.7
AL hold				

=== Elections in the 2000s ===
General Election 2008: Dinajpur-6
Party	Candidate	Votes	%	±%
AL	Azizul Haque Choudhury	133,610	39.1	+7.1
Jamaat	Anwarul Islam	132,752	38.8	−1.0
JP(E)	Md. Delwar Hossain	75,740	22.1	N/A
Majority		858	0.3	−7.5
Turnout		342,102	91.4	+9.1
AL gain from Jamaat				

General Election 2001: Dinajpur-6
Party	Candidate	Votes	%	±%
Jamaat	Azizur Rahman Chowdhury	110,598	39.8	+23.4
AL	Md. Mostafizur Rahman Fizu	88,943	32.0	−4.4
Independent	Atiur Rahman	32,548	11.7	N/A
IJOF	Munser Ali	28,801	10.4	N/A
Independent	Azizul Haque Chowdhury	13,394	4.8	N/A
Independent	Mizanur Rahman	3,073	1.1	N/A
JSD	Md. Afzal Hossain	386	0.1	N/A
Independent	Mathias Saren Mothi	364	0.1	N/A
Majority		21,655	7.8	+1.6
Turnout		278,107	82.3	+4.4
Jamaat gain from AL				

=== Elections in the 1990s ===
General Election June 1996: Dinajpur-6
Party	Candidate	Votes	%	±%
AL	Md. Mostafizur Rahman Fizu	75,268	36.4	N/A
BNP	Atiur Rahman	62,495	30.2	+7.2
Jamaat	Azizur Rahman Chowdhury	33,934	16.4	−12.3
JP(E)	Md. Monser Ali Sarkar	32,352	15.7	+10.8
IOJ	Md. Abdul Qudddus	1,057	0.5	N/A
Independent	Md. Mosarraf Hossain	387	0.2	N/A
Jatiya Samajtantrik Dal-JSD	Md. Shah Alam Biswash	376	0.2	N/A
Bangladesh Janata Party	Md. Moula Boksh	296	0.1	−1.2
Gano Forum	Md. Golam Mostofa	252	0.1	N/A
Zaker Party	Md. A.T.M. Rezaul	203	0.1	−0.3
Majority		12,773	6.2	+1.8
Turnout		206,620	77.9	+19.7
AL gain from Jamaat				

General Election 1991: Dinajpur-6
Party	Candidate	Votes	%	±%
Jamaat	Azizur Rahman Chowdhury	43,989	28.7	
BAKSAL	Abdul Salam Aman	37,267	24.3	
BNP	Atiur Rahman	35,255	23.0	
Independent	Md. Mostafizur Rahman	19,540	12.7	
JP(E)	Md. Mojibur Rahman	7,463	4.9	
Independent	Marius Tudu	6,122	4.0	
Bangladesh Janata Party	Md. Jahangir Selim	1,992	1.3	
Zaker Party	Md. Mokbul Hosein	636	0.4	
JSD (S)	Shree Budla Urau	422	0.3	
WPB	Shree Mondol Soren	372	0.2	
Jatiya Samajtantrik Dal-JSD	Md. Sadeq Ali Prodhan	317	0.2	
Majority		6,722	4.4	
Turnout		153,375	58.2	
Jamaat gain from				
