= Zafar Muhammad Lutfar =

Bangladeshi politician

Member of Bangladesh Parliament
- In office 1986–1988
- Preceded by: Golam Rahman Shah
- Succeeded by: Abdus Sattar Chowdhury

Personal details
- Political party: National Awami Party (Muzaffar)

Zafar Muhammad Lutfar is a National Awami Party (Muzaffar) politician and a former member of parliament for Dinajpur-6.

== Career ==
Lutfar was elected to parliament from Dinajpur-6 as a National Awami Party (Muzaffar) candidate in 1986.
