= Shopnopuri artificial amusement park =

Park in Rangpur Division, Bangladesh

Coordinates: 25.505°N 89.065°E

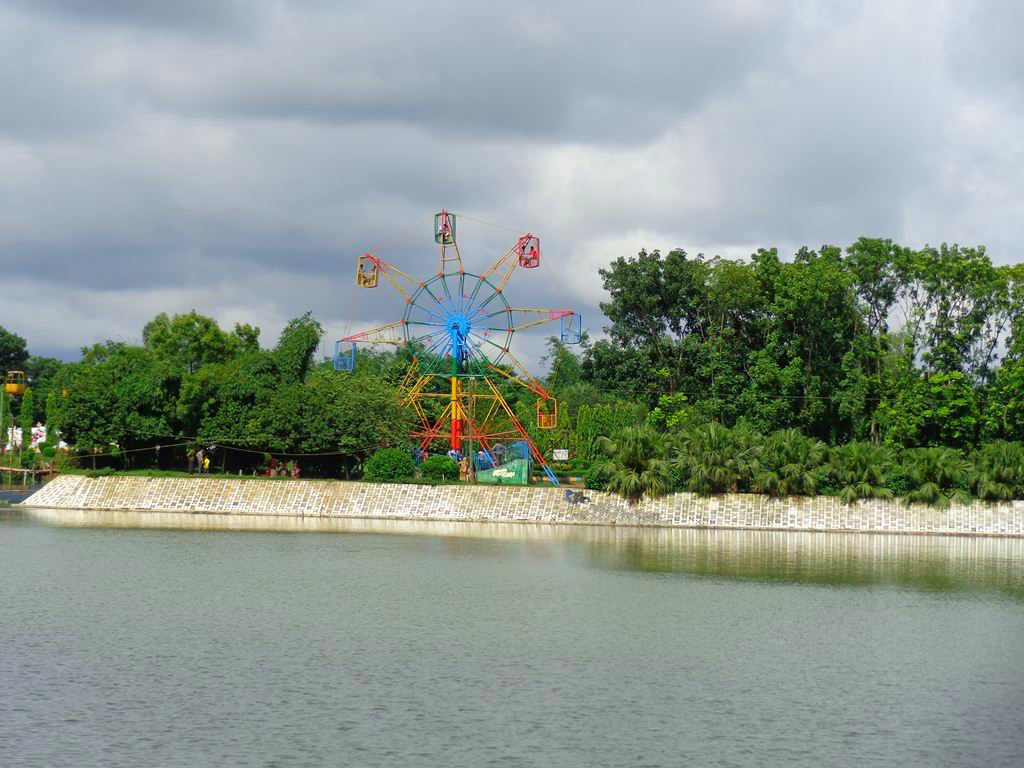
Wheels at Shopnopuri

Shopnopuri Artificial Amusement Park is a spot for tourists situated in Nawabganj Upazila, Dinajpur of Rangpur Division, Bangladesh. There are rides, a mini zoo, few rest-houses, many gardens, lakes, central picnic center and countless shopping areas. Other tourist locations include Fish World, ‘Rongdhonu’ Art Gallery, and ‘Moha Maya Indrojal’. Fish World offers artificial fishes and various aquatic animals. The Animal Kingdom is filled with artificial sculptures of some animals like flamingos, dinosaurs, Pegasus and many more. ‘Rongdhonu’ Art Gallery has a variety of sculptures and paintings. It is a popular site for picnics.

== Artistic sculptures ==
- An artificial lake
- A sculpture of Rabindra NathThagore
- Sculpture of a fairy
- Sculpture of a dinosaur
- Statue of the National flag, a poet, fruit and bird.

== Location ==
Aftabgonj, Nawabgonj Upzilla, Dinajpur, Rangpur.
