= Golam Rabbani Ahmad =

Bengali politician

Maulvi Golam Rabbani Ahmad
- গোলাম রব্বানী আহমদ

Member of the Bengal Legislative Assembly
- In office 1942–1945
- Constituency: Dinajpur

Personal details
- Born: Patuapara, Dinajpur District, Bengal Presidency
- Died: 5 March 1961 Bangladesh
- Party: Krishak Praja Party
- Education: University of Calcutta

Maulvi Golam Rabbani Ahmad (Bengali: গোলাম রব্বানী আহমদ; died 5 March 1961), popularly known as Deputy Rabbani (Bengali: ডেপুটি রব্বানী), was a Member of the Bengal Legislative Assembly as a representative of Dinajpur District.

== Early life and education ==
He was born into a Bengali family in the village of Patuapara in Prananathpur mouza of Dinajpur. He was the second Dinajpuri Muslim graduate after Khan Bahadur Mahtabuddin Ahmad.

== Career ==
Golam Rabbani Ahmad worked as a schoolteacher and inspector. In 1920, he served as the Deputy Inspector of Schools in Kurigram and transferred to Howrah under orders to act as Deputy Inspector of Schools (Class IV, Subordinate Educational Service). Ahmad was elected to the Bengal Legislative Assembly as a Krishak Praja Party candidate for Dinajpur following a by-election held in 1942.

== Death ==
He died on 5 March 1961.
