= Dinajpur =

City in Dinajpur District, Rangpur Division

Dinajpur দিনাজপুর
- City and Municipality
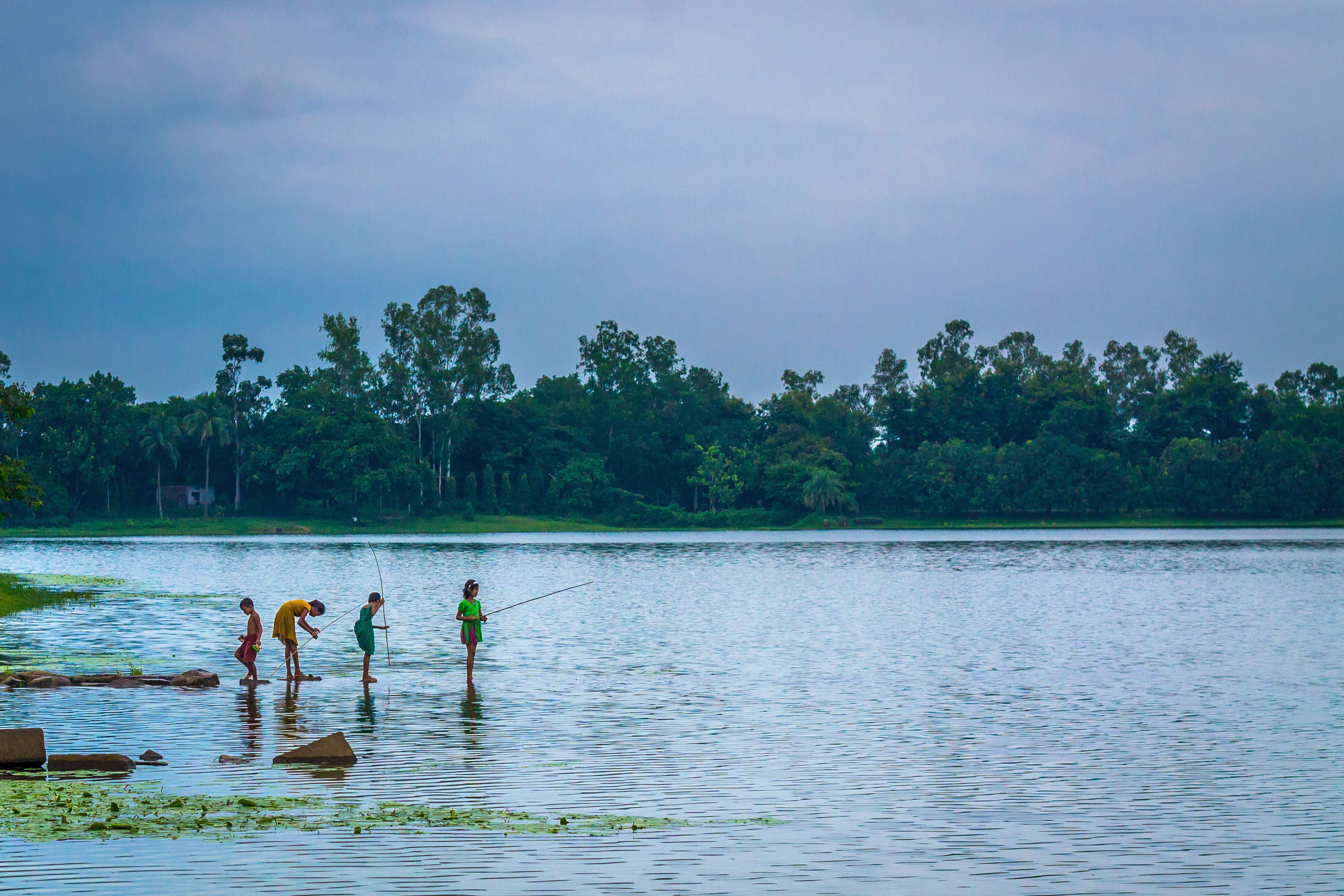
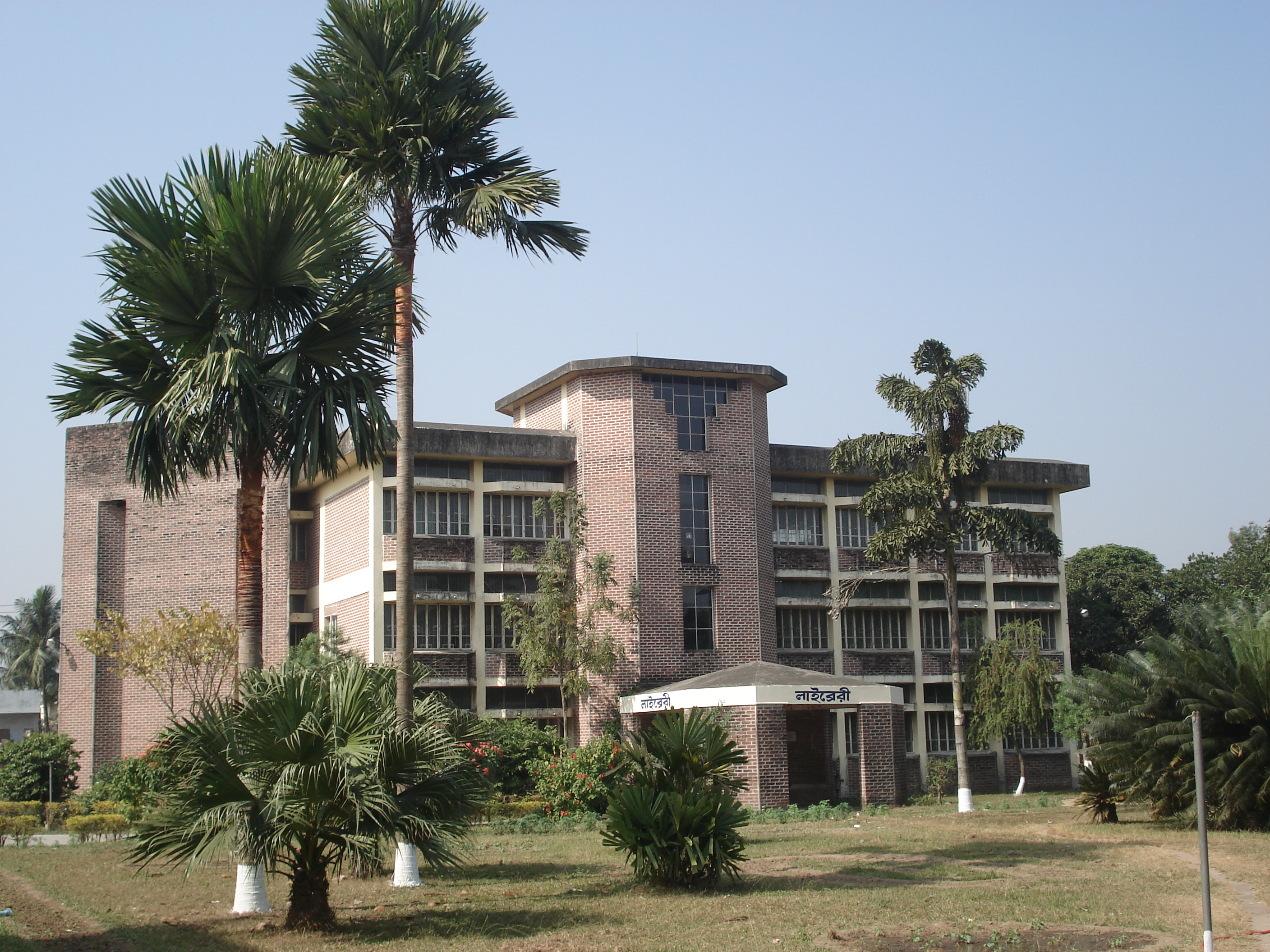
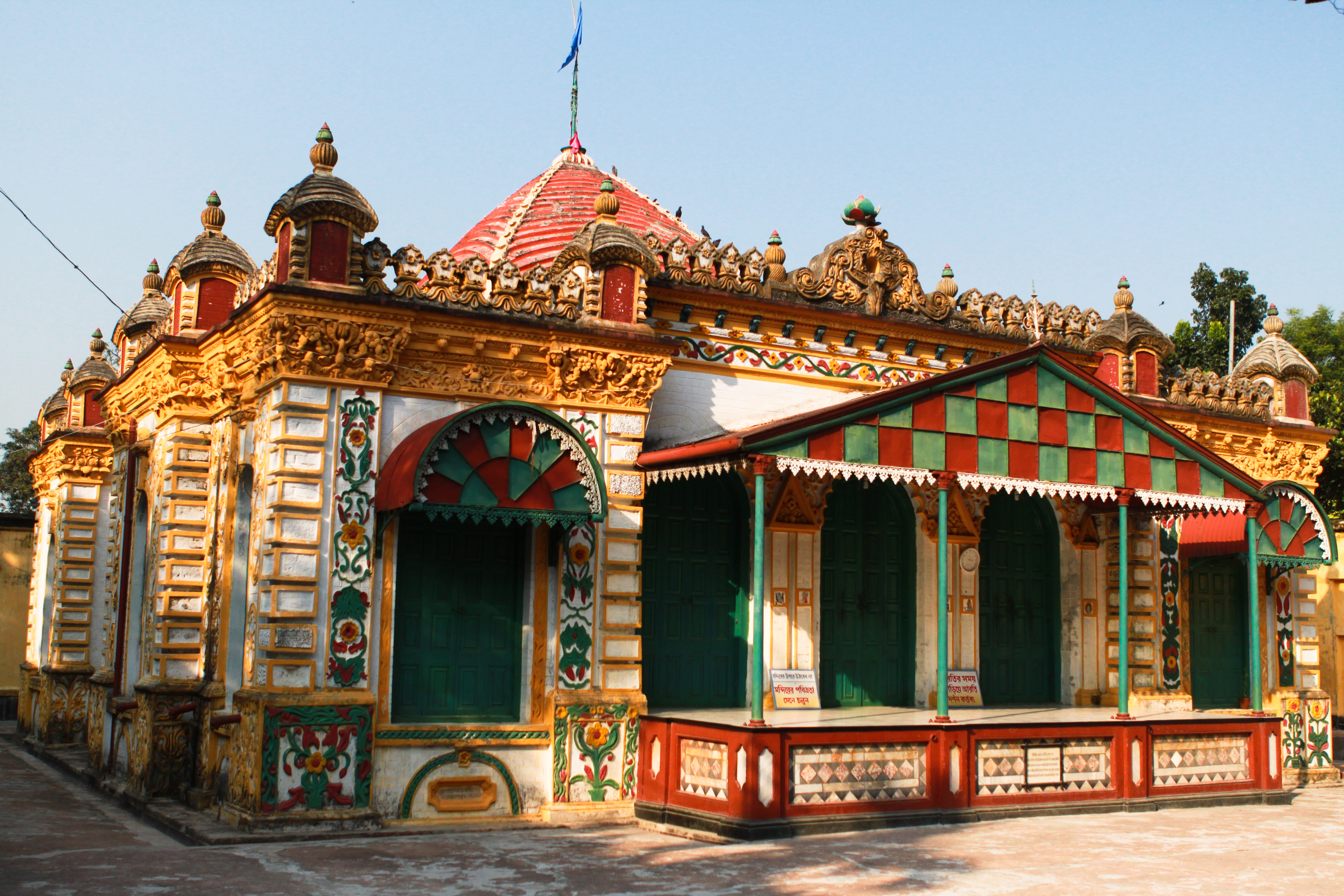
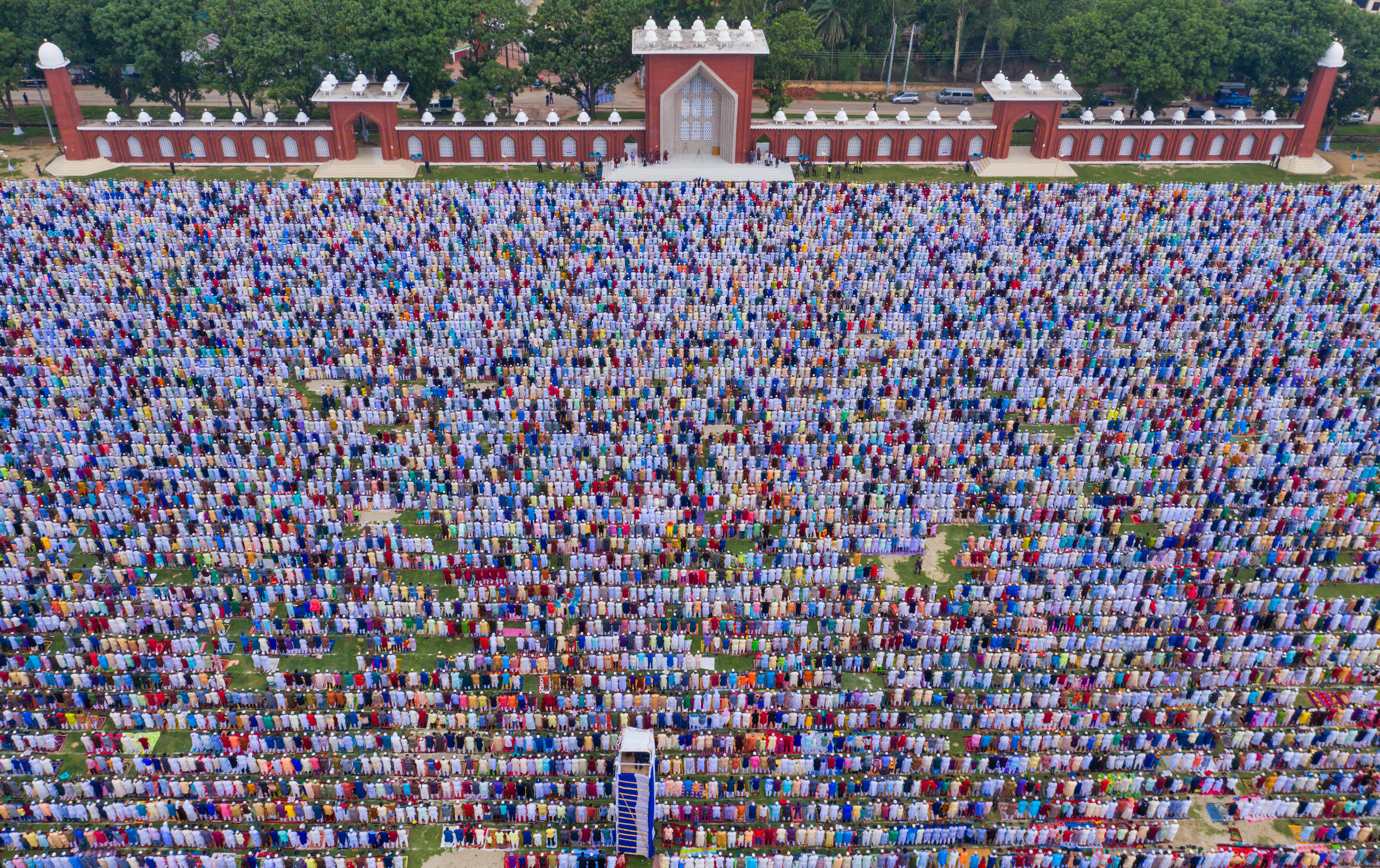
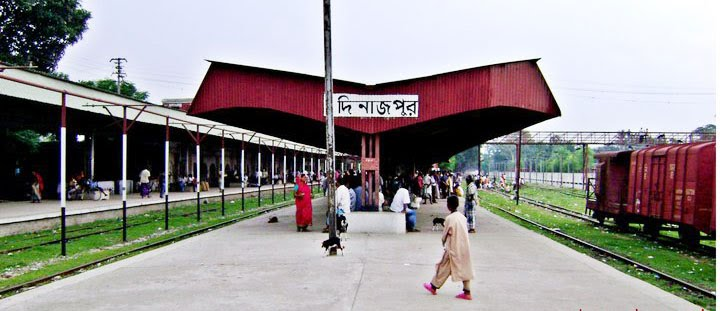
- Clockwise from the top: Ramsagar National Park, Dinajpur Rajbari Temple, Dinajpur Railway Station, Gor-e-Shahid Eidgah and Hajee Mohammad Danesh Science and Technology University

- Location within Rangpur division Location within Bangladesh
- Coordinates: 25°37′44″N 88°38′13″E
- Country: Bangladesh
- Division: Rangpur
- District: Dinajpur
- Upazila: Dinajpur Sadar

Government
  - Type: Mayor–Council
  - Body: Dinajpur Municipality
  - Paura Mayor

Area
  - Total: 22.8 km^{2} (8.8 sq mi)

Population (2022)
  - Total: 212,275
  - Density: 9,310/km^{2} (24,100/sq mi)
  - Ethnicities: Bengali
- Time zone: UTC+6 (Bangladesh Time)
- National Dialing Code: +880
- Website: www.dinajpur.gov.bd

Dinajpur (Bengali: দিনাজপুর [dinad͡ʒpur]) is a city and the district headquarters of Dinajpur district situated in Rangpur Division, Bangladesh. It was founded in 1786. It is located 413 km north-west of Dhaka. It is bounded on the north by Suihari, Katapara, Bangi Bechapara, Pulhat, and Koshba on the south; on the east by Shekpura; and by the river Punarbhaba on the west. About 213,000 people live here which makes this city the 21st largest city in Bangladesh.

Dinajpur Municipality mahallah geocode map

== Geography and climate ==
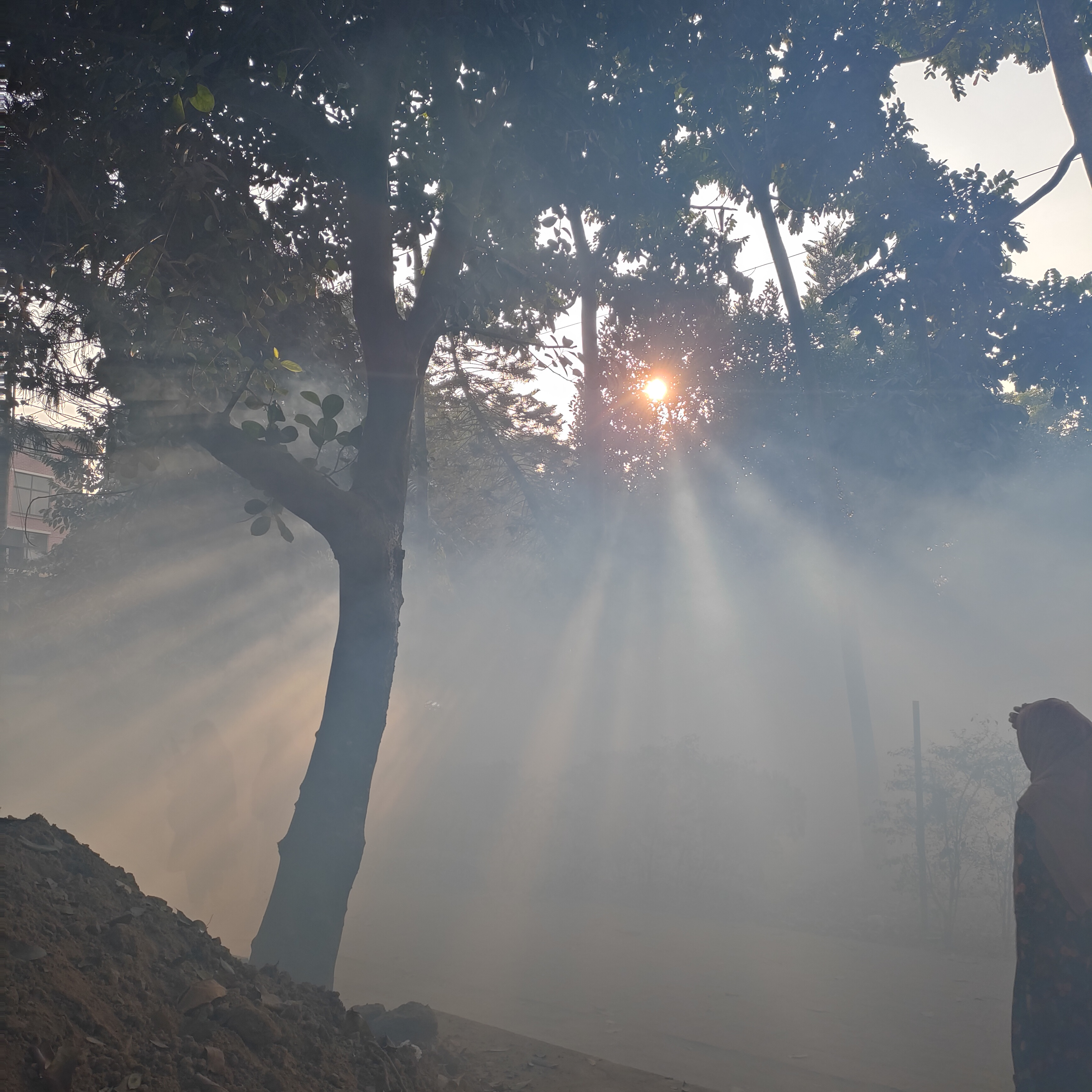
Winter morning in Dinajpur

Dinajpur is located in the north-western part of the country. It covers an area of 20.7 square kilometers (8.0 sq mi).

It is situated at 25°37′N 88°39′E on the eastern bank of the river Punarbhaba. Dinajpur has a humid subtropical climate (Cwa) that borders a tropical climate and has humid, hot summers, characterized monsoon season and mild, dry winters.

Climate data for Dinajpur (1991–2020 normals, extremes 1883–present)
Month	Jan	Feb	Mar	Apr	May	Jun	Jul	Aug	Sep	Oct	Nov	Dec	Year
Record high °C (°F)	29.5 (85.1)	33.5 (92.3)	37.3 (99.1)	41.0 (105.8)	43.6 (110.5)	40.7 (105.3)	38.9 (102.0)	38.6 (101.5)	38.6 (101.5)	36.1 (97.0)	33.5 (92.3)	30.5 (86.9)	43.6 (110.5)
Mean daily maximum °C (°F)	22.6 (72.7)	26.6 (79.9)	30.9 (87.6)	32.6 (90.7)	32.8 (91.0)	32.9 (91.2)	32.4 (90.3)	32.7 (90.9)	32.2 (90.0)	31.3 (88.3)	29.2 (84.6)	25.0 (77.0)	30.1 (86.2)
Daily mean °C (°F)	15.6 (60.1)	19.4 (66.9)	24.0 (75.2)	26.8 (80.2)	28.0 (82.4)	29.0 (84.2)	29.0 (84.2)	29.2 (84.6)	28.4 (83.1)	26.5 (79.7)	22.2 (72.0)	17.7 (63.9)	24.7 (76.5)
Mean daily minimum °C (°F)	10.3 (50.5)	13.3 (55.9)	17.6 (63.7)	21.4 (70.5)	23.6 (74.5)	25.6 (78.1)	26.3 (79.3)	26.4 (79.5)	25.5 (77.9)	22.5 (72.5)	16.7 (62.1)	12.3 (54.1)	20.1 (68.2)
Record low °C (°F)	3.2 (37.8)	6.2 (43.2)	10.0 (50.0)	14.3 (57.7)	16.5 (61.7)	20.0 (68.0)	22.8 (73.0)	23.4 (74.1)	20.7 (69.3)	16.4 (61.5)	10.5 (50.9)	6.0 (42.8)	3.2 (37.8)
Average precipitation mm (inches)	9 (0.4)	11 (0.4)	15 (0.6)	74 (2.9)	214 (8.4)	358 (14.1)	387 (15.2)	337 (13.3)	373 (14.7)	148 (5.8)	6 (0.2)	5 (0.2)	1,937 (76.3)
Average precipitation days (≥ 1 mm)	1	2	2	6	12	17	20	17	15	6	1	1	100
Average relative humidity (%)	79	70	63	68	76	82	84	84	85	82	78	78	77
Mean monthly sunshine hours	183.0	214.1	250.6	222.2	212.6	160.2	154.5	171.4	172.1	227.3	235.9	205.4	2,409.3
Source 1: NOAA
Source 2: Bangladesh Meteorological Department (humidity 1981-2010)

== Demographics ==
Religions in Dinajpur Paurashava (2022)
Religion	Percent
Islam	86.39%
Hinduism	12.08%
Christianity	1.43%
Other or not stated	0.10%

According to the 2022 Bangladesh census, Dinajpur Paurashava had 51,479 households and a population of 212,288. Dinajpur had a literacy rate of 88.79%: 90.79% for males and 86.70% for females, and a sex ratio of 104.67 males per 100 females. 7.30% of the population was under 5 years of age. Ethnic population was 2,097 (0.99%) of which 1242 were Santal and 501 Oraon.

According to the 2011 Bangladesh census, Dinajpur city had 40,929 households and a population of 186,727. 31,320 (16.77%) were under 10 years of age. Dinajpur had a literacy rate (age 7 and over) of 75.37%, compared to the national average of 51.8%, and a sex ratio of 942 females per 1,000 males. The ethnic population was 2,402 (1.29%), of which 1,385 were Santal and 777 Oraon.

== Education ==
Over the last 25 years, Dinajpur has attracted some prominent educational institutions, all of which are government financed. They are as follows:

Hajee Mohammad Danesh Science & Technology University is located 13 km north of Dinajpur town and is one of the prominent institutions in North Bengal. It offers various undergraduate programs such as computer science, BBA, agriculture, fisheries, veterinary medicine and postgraduate programs like agronomy, horticulture and soil science.

Established in 1992, M Abdur Rahim Medical College (former Dinajpur Medical College) is one of the 36 government financed medical institutions located at historical Ananda sagar area in Dinajpur City. Currently, it offers a five-year MBBS Program, along with a one-year compulsory post-graduation internship program. In 2009, Dinajpur city began an English version of education. Some notable English Version schools are: Bethel Int'l School, Dinajpur Ridge School, Dinajpur Laboratory School, Dinajpur Public School, South Point School and Green International School. Dinajpur Polytechnic Institute, Textile Institute Dinajpur, Saint Philip's High School & College, Saint Joseph School Dinajpur, Dinajpur Zilla school, Dinajpur Govt. Girls High School, Dinajpur High School, Dinajpur Police Line School, Dinajpur Collectorate School & College, Dinajpur Govt. College, is one of the best institutions in Dinajpur.

Tenth educational board of Bangladesh has been established in Dinajpur in 2007. From 2009 S.S.C. (Secondary School Certificate) and H.S.C. (Higher Secondary School Certificate) exams have been started to be taken. In S.S.C. exam for the first time it stood 2nd in the country in the G.P.A. 5 list.

== History ==
At first, after its formation in 1856, the Dinajpur Municipality used to be run by a town committee presided over by the Deputy Magistrate. This was among the first 40 municipalities in Bengal at that time. Later in 1868, the 'District Town Act' commissioned a chairman of the municipality who replaced the Deputy Magistrate and given a similar rank as a District Magistrate. Mr. Patterson was appointed the first chairman of Dinajpur Municipality in 1869. Now present Mayor is Syed Jahangir Alam. It is indicative of how the demography of Dinajpur is largely diversified. People from Maldah, Bihar, Jalpaiguri and Rajsthan state of India can be easily seen sattled here throughout the district and city as well.

== Agriculture ==
Dinajpur is famous for agriculture. Specially Dinajpur is famous for its Litchi and aromatic rice (Katarivog).

== Sister towns ==
- (United States) Pembroke Park, Florida

== Notable people ==
- Air Vice-Marshal Momtaz Uddin Ahmed, Seventh Chief of Air Staff of Bangladesh Air Force
- Narayan Gangopadhyay, novelist, poet, essayist, and short-story writer
- Haji Mohammad Danesh, politician and communist activist
- Swami Atmasthananda, fifteenth president of the Ramakrishna Math and the Ramakrishna Mission
- Debojyoti Mishra, Indian music director and film composer
- Liton Das, cricketer
- Shawkat Ali, Prominent novelist
- Mohammad Farhad, popularly known as "Comrade Farhad", guerrilla force commander during the Bangladesh independence war, and the President of Communist Party of Bangladesh and former member of Jatiya Sangsad
- Golam Rabbani Ahmad (died 1961), politician and school inspector

== Gallery ==
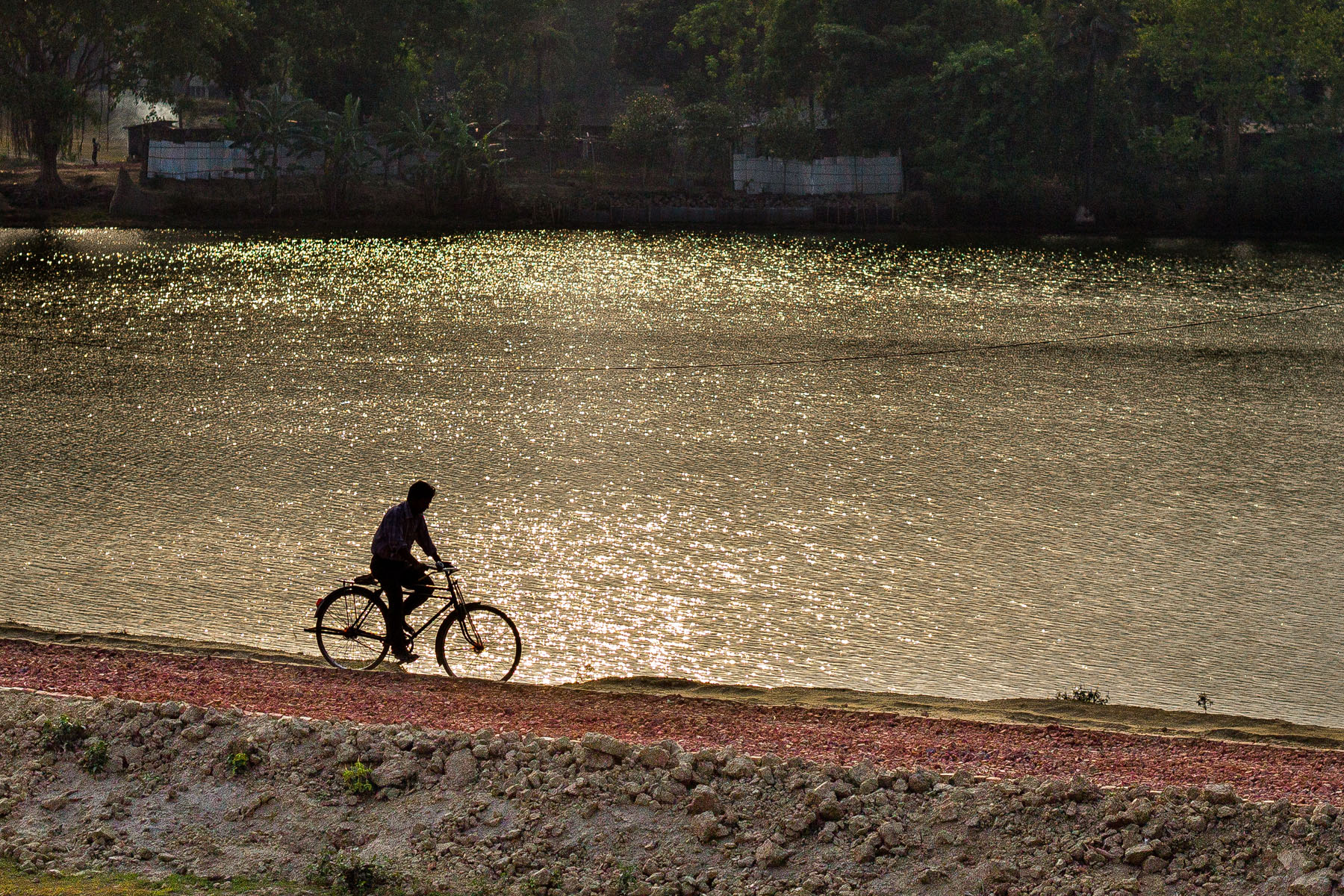
Sukh Sagor

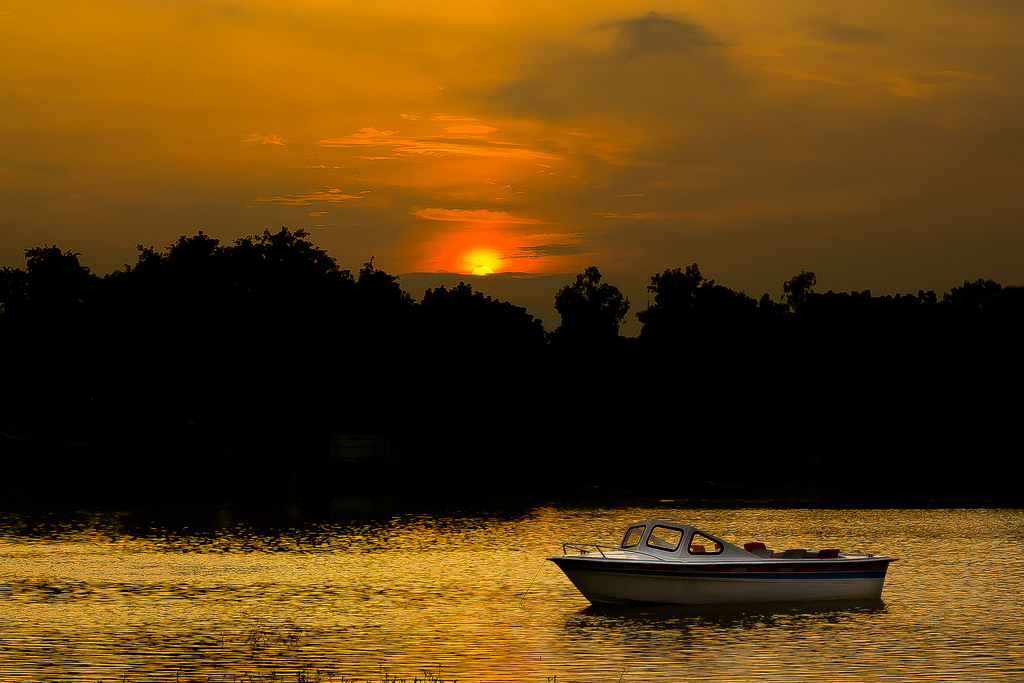
Matasagor

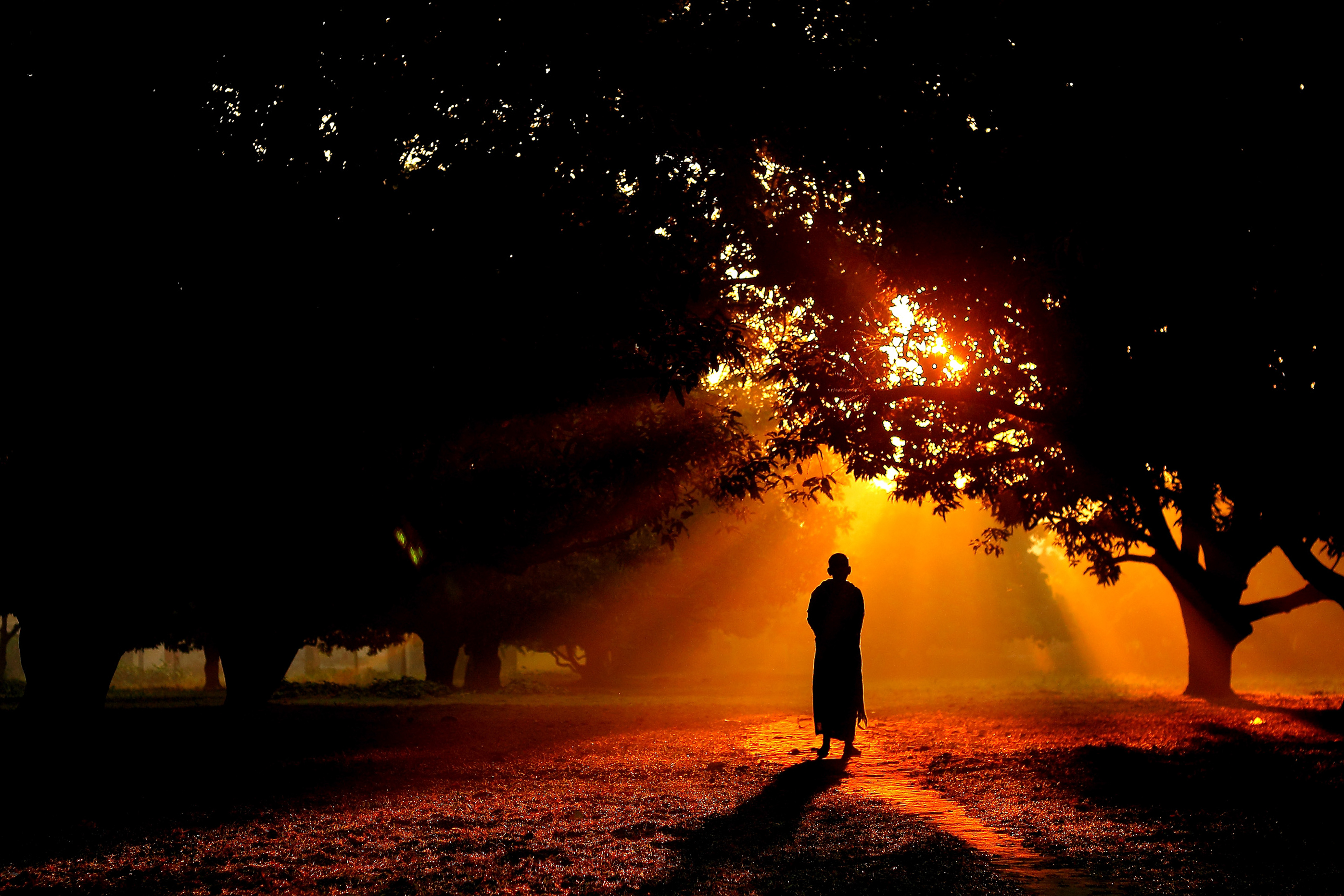
Bangibechar Hat

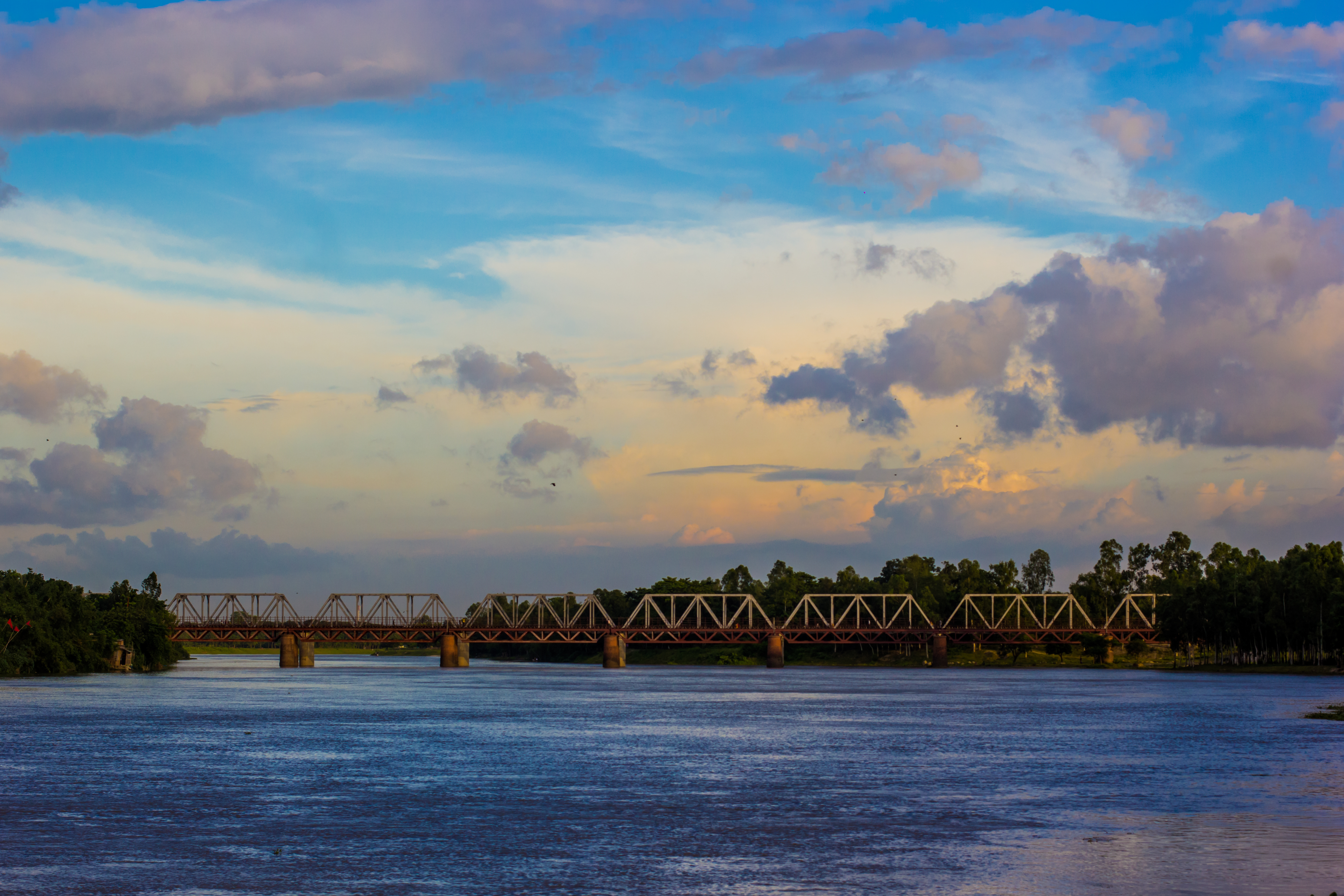
Dinajpur Railway Bridge

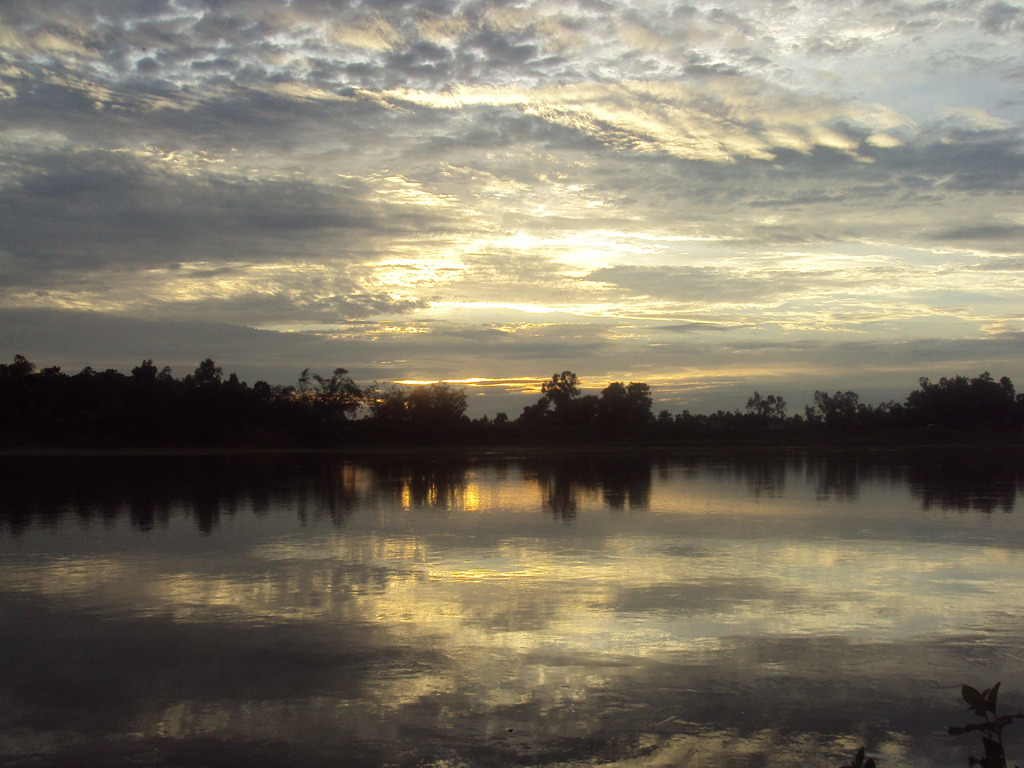
Punarbhaba River
