= Nawabganj National Park =

National park in Dinajpur district, Bangladesh

- IUCN category IV (habitat/species management area)
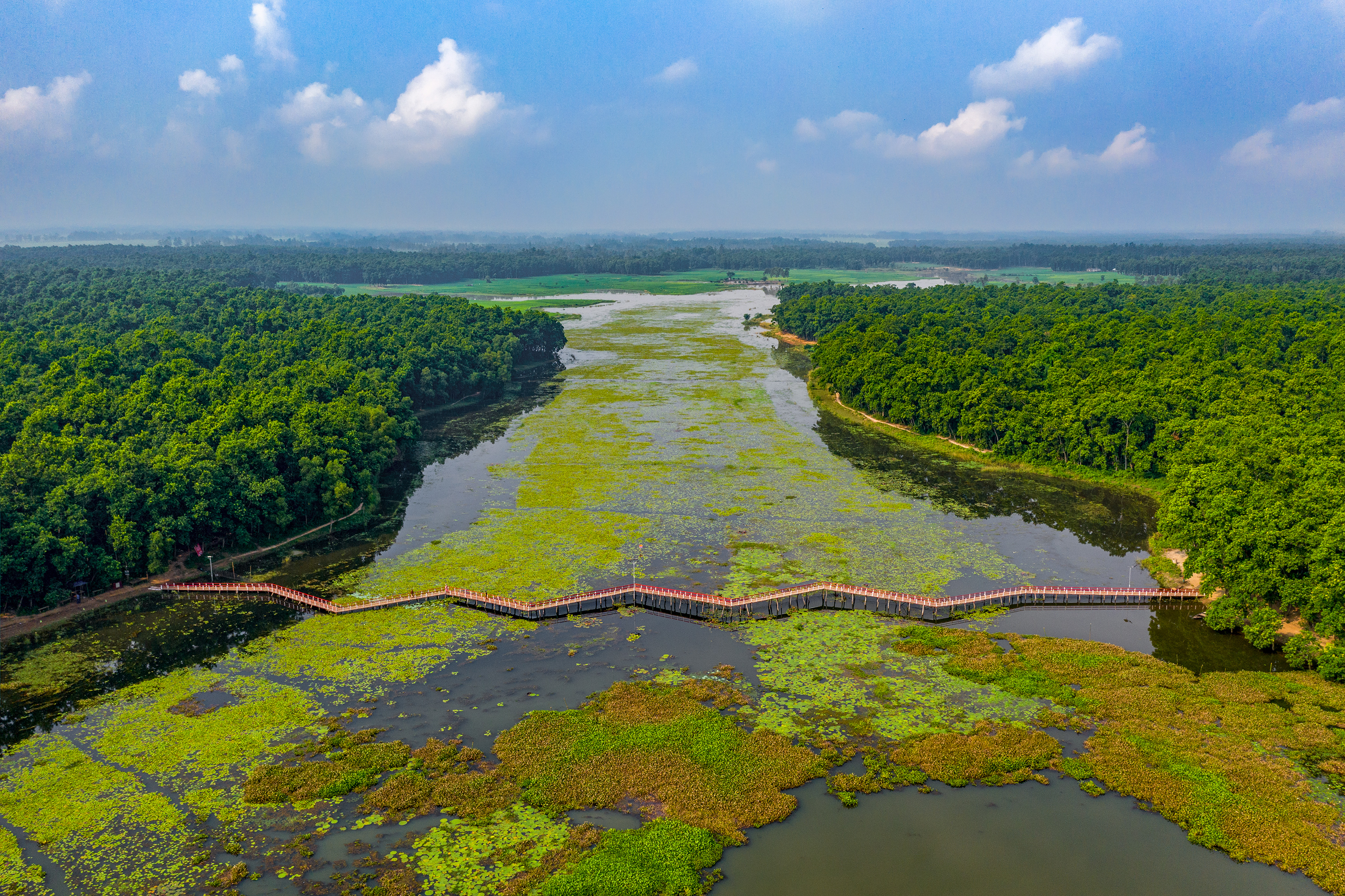
- Interactive map of Nawabganj National Park
- Location: Nawabganj, Dinajpur District, Bangladesh
- Coordinates: 25.43192°N 89.05960°E
- Area: 517.61 ha (1,279.0 acres)
- Established: 24 October 2010

Nawabganj National Park (Bengali: নবাবগঞ্জ জাতীয় উদ্যান) is an IUCN Category IV national park and nature reserve in Bangladesh. The park is located about one kilometer northwest of Nawabganj Upazila Sadar under Dinajpur District.

The park encompasses the Jagannathpur, Harilakhur, Bara Jalalpur, Alokdhuti, Tarpanghat, Rasulpur and Khatkhatia Kristapur areas of Nawabganj forest. The dominant floras are teak and Shorea robusta (sal trees); it is known locally as Nawabganj Shal Bagaan or "Shalban Garden". There are also Gmelina arborea, Eucalyptus regnans, Syzygium cumini, Acacia auriculiformis and a few types of Orchidaceae. Wild animals include Bengal fox, jungle cat, fishing cat and snakes.

The park was officially declared a national park by the government of Bangladesh on 24 October 2010 for the purpose of conservation of flora, fauna, and nature and the development of tourism facilities. It covers an area of 517.61 hectares.
