= Nawabganj Upazila, Dinajpur =

Nawabganj নবাবগঞ্জ
- Upazila
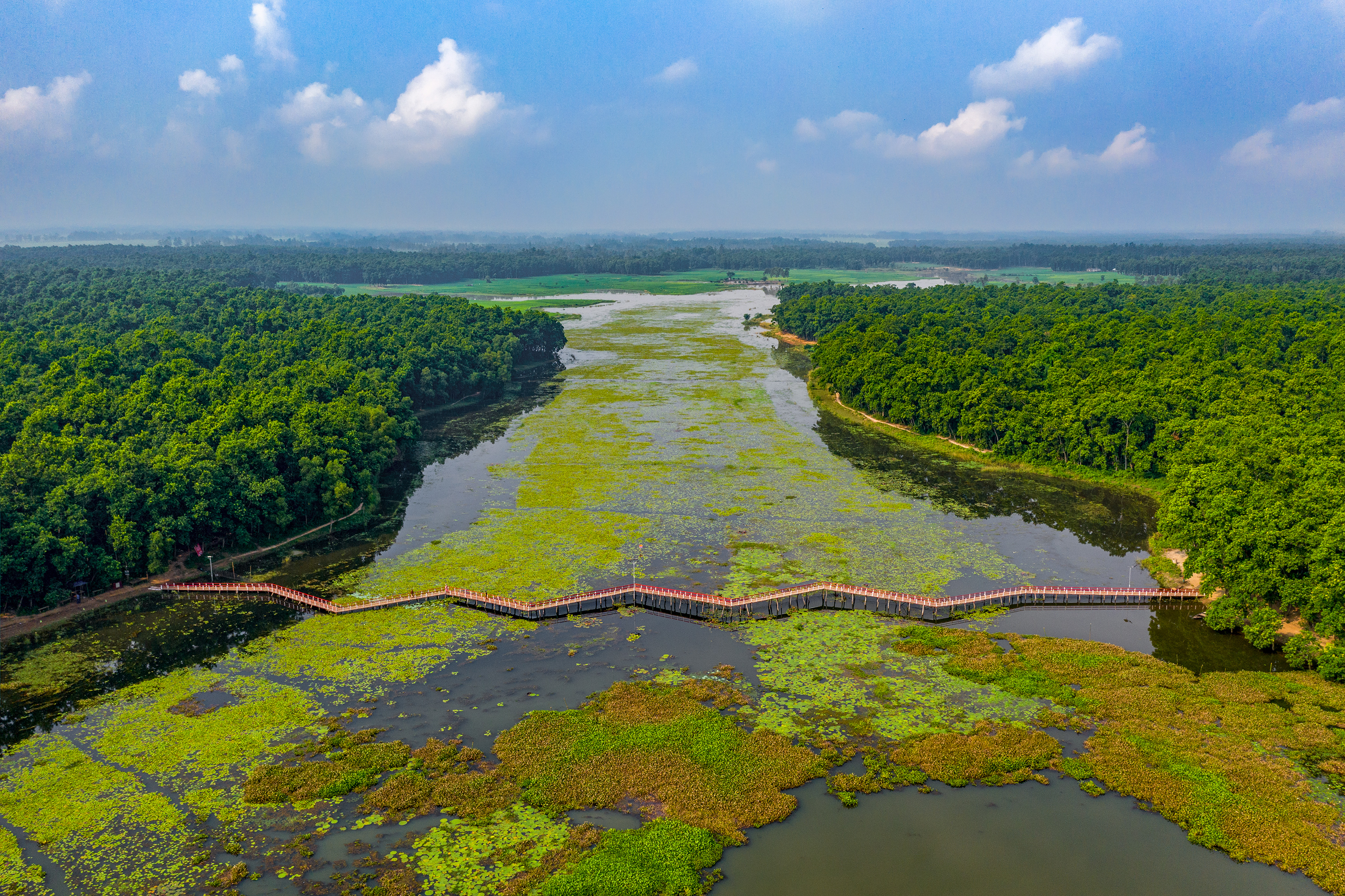
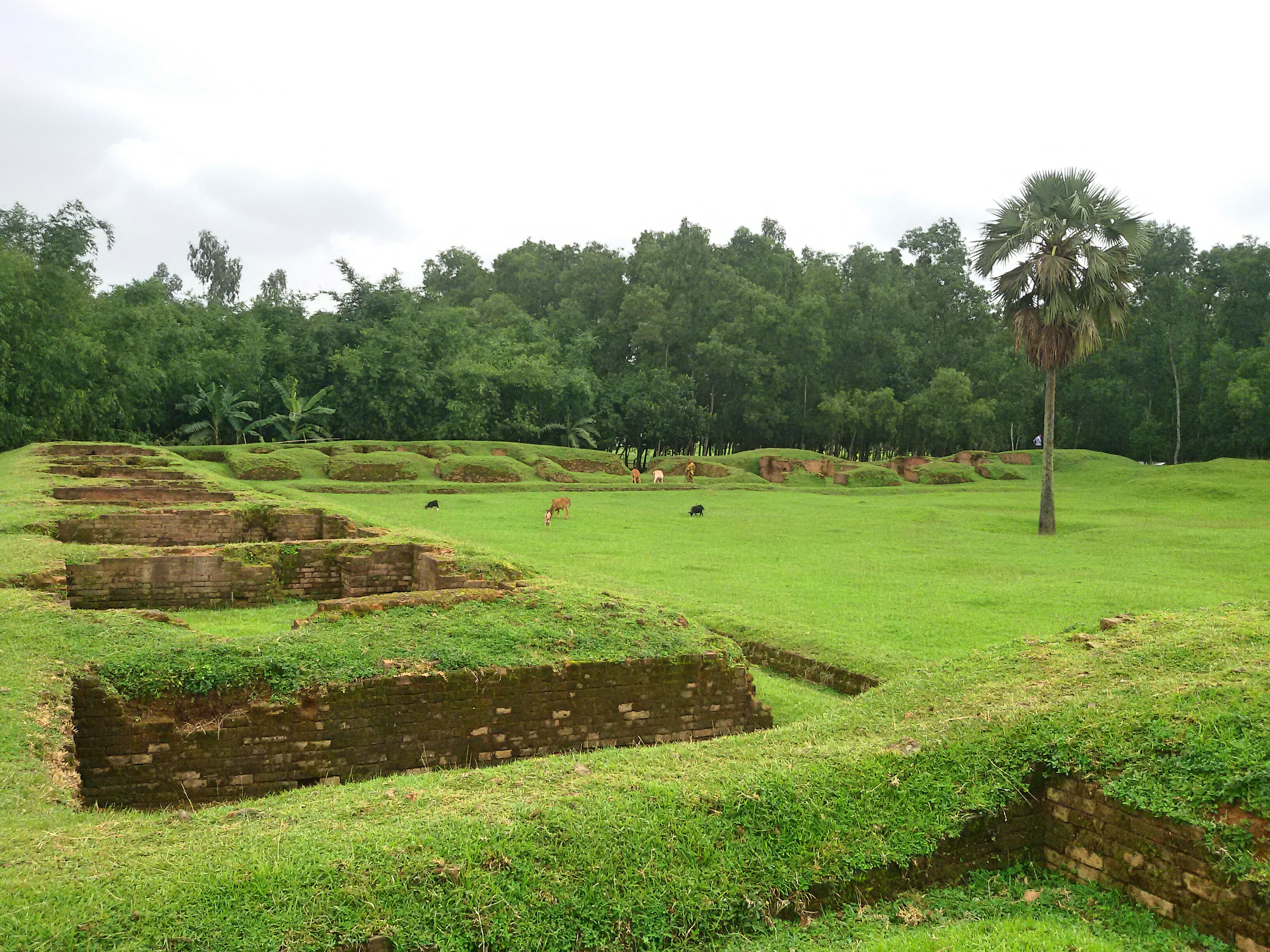
- Nawabganj National Park & Sitakot Vihara

- Coordinates: 25°25′N 89°5′E
- Country: Bangladesh
- Division: Rangpur
- District: Dinajpur

Government
  - Chief Executive Officer: Md. Anisur Rahman

Area
  - Total: 314.68 km^{2} (121.50 sq mi)

Population (2022)
  - Total: 254,036
  - Density: 807.28/km^{2} (2,090.9/sq mi)
- Time zone: UTC+6 (BST)
- Postal code: 5280
- Website: Official Map of Nawabganj

Nawabganj (Bengali: নবাবগঞ্জ; Bengali pronunciation: [nɔbabɡɔndʒ]) is an upazila of Dinajpur District in the Division of Rangpur, Bangladesh.

== Geography ==
Nawabganj is located at 25.4167°N 89.0833°E. It has a total area of 314.68 km^{2}. The upazila is bounded by Parbatipur upazila on the north, Ghoraghat and Hakimpur upazilas on the south, Pirganj, Mithapukur and Badarganj upazilas on the east, Birampur and Phulbari upazilas on the west. Nawabganj Upazila has 60 thousand metric tonnes of coal, stored in a village called Dighipara.

== Demographics ==
Religions in Nawabganj Upazila (2022)
Religion	Percent
Islam	88.31%
Hinduism	7.36%
Christianity	3.00%
Other or not stated	1.33%

According to the 2022 Bangladeshi census, Nababganj Upazila had 67,750 households and a population of 254,036. 8.84% of the population were under 5 years of age. Nababganj had a literacy rate (age 7 and over) of 71.57%: 73.72% for males and 69.42% for females, and a sex ratio of 100.34 males for every 100 females. 11,717 (4.61%) lived in urban areas.

According to the 2011 Census of Bangladesh, Nawabganj Upazila had 57,851 households and a population of 229,337. 50,979 (22.23%) were under 10 years of age. Nawabganj had a literacy rate (age 7 and over) of 42.83%, compared to the national average of 51.8%, and a sex ratio of 998 females per 1000 males. 7,225 (3.15%) lived in urban areas. According to the 2022 census, total population was 254,036. Ethnic population was 8,463(3.33%) in which Santal people was 7,014, and Oraon people was 875.

Population of upazila by ethnicity (2022)
1. Bengali (96.7%)
2. Santal (2.76%)
3. Others (0.57%)

As of the 1991 Bangladesh census, Nawabganj has a population of 170301. Males constitute 51.28% of the population, and females 48.72%. This Upazila's eighteen up population is 88690. Nawabganj has an average literacy rate of 24.2% (7+ years), and the national average of 32.4% literate.

== Economy ==
Dighipara a small village under Putimara Union, is the largest deposit of coal, mainly anthracite and silica in Bangladesh. BAPEX have already surveyed the underground deposits in 1994. Villagers want well-justified decisions that facilitates both the country, environment and residents nearby. As controversial dispute in Phulbari Coal mine project with Asia Energy, Government of Bangladesh and local people; Dighipara will be a free, transparent solution for both the energy crisis and demands of the local people.

== Points of interest ==
- Nawabganj National Park

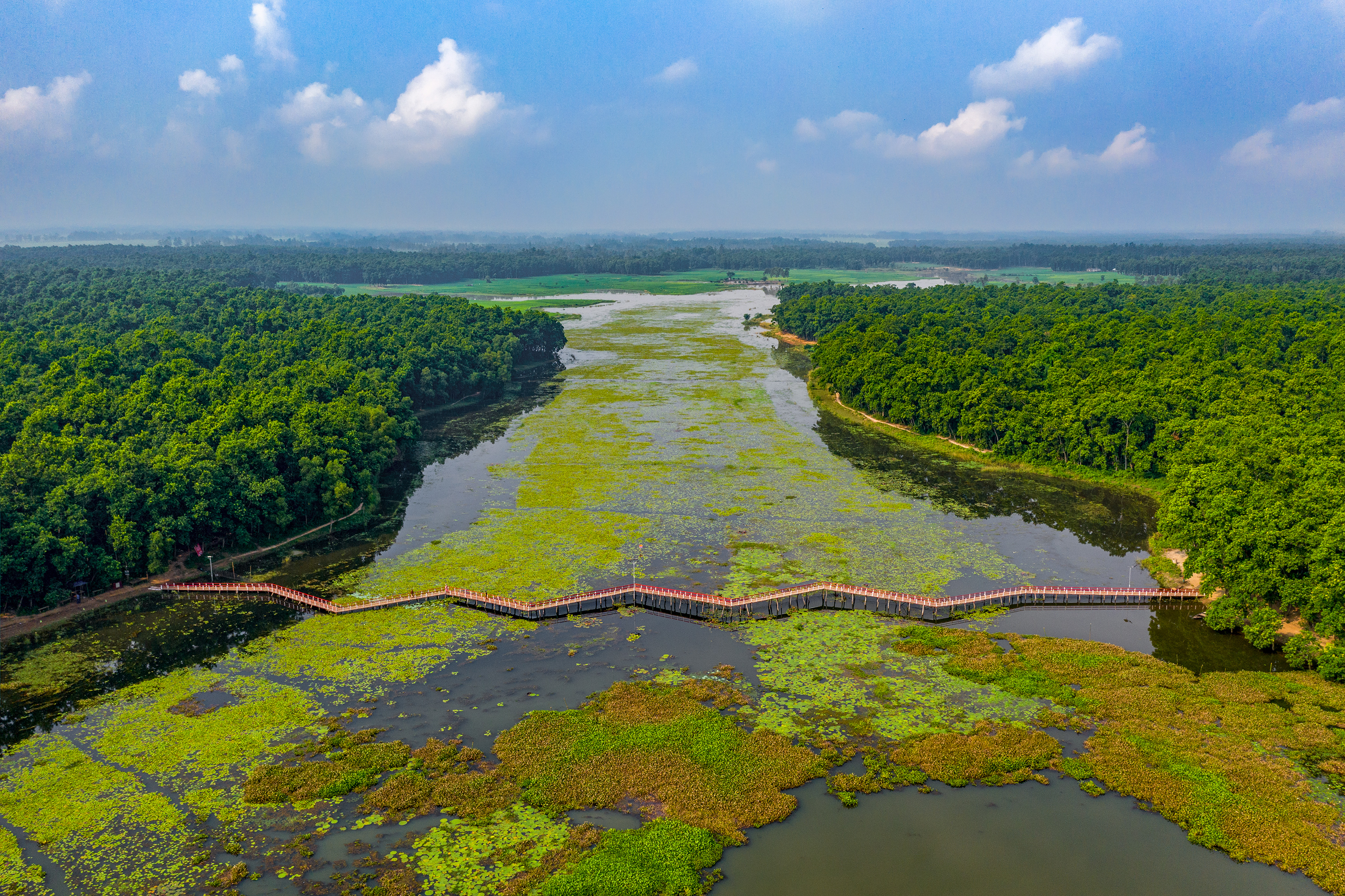
Nawabganj National Park, Dinajpur

A well balanced ecosystem in the 517.61 hectares of Shal forest and a lake is a tourist attraction here. It includes a unique canal system and a 3–4 km region with ambient atmosphere. Guest birds are available year-round. It was declared as National forest under the Name "Nawabganj National Forest" at 24/10/2010 by the People's Republic of Bangladesh.

- Shopnopuri Amusement Park

== Administration ==
UNO: Md. Anisur Rahman.

Nawabganj Upazila is divided into Nawabganj Municipality and nine union parishads: Bhaduria, Binodnagar, Daudpur, Golapgonj, Joypur, Kushdaha, Mahmudpur, Putimara, and Shalkhuria. The union parishads are subdivided into 212 mauzas and 272 villages.

== Education ==
There are a number of educational institutions including degree colleges, mohila degree colleges, high schools, madrashas, and primary school. Aftabganj Degree College, Daudpur Degree College, Daudpur M.L. High School, Hatisal Fazil Madrasha, Boalmari/Kanchdoho Fazil Madrasha, Raghobendrapur Alim Senior Madrasah are noted ones. All these institutions provide qualified sound education.
