= Azizur Rahman Chowdhury =

Bangladeshi politician (1946–2011)

- আজিজুর রহমান চৌধুরী

Member of Bangladesh Parliament

Personal details
- Born: 1946 Dinajpur
- Died: 30 May 2011 (aged 64–65) Dinajpur
- Party: Bangladesh Jamaat-e-Islami

Azizur Rahman Chowdhury (1946–2011) was a politician of the Bangladesh Jamaat-e-Islami and a member of parliament for Dinajpur-6.

== Career ==
Azizur Rahman Chowdhury was born in 1946 in Professorpara of Birampur Upazila of Dinajpur District, Bangladesh. He was the principal of Bijul Darul Huda Kamil Post Graduate Madrasa for a long time. Chowdhury was elected to the parliament from Dinajpur-6 as a candidate of the Bangladesh Jamaat-e-Islami in 1991 and 2001.

== Death ==
Aziz died on 30 May 2011.
