= Christianity in Bangladesh =

Bangladeshi Christians Bāṅlādēśī Khristān বাংলাদেশী খ্রিস্টান

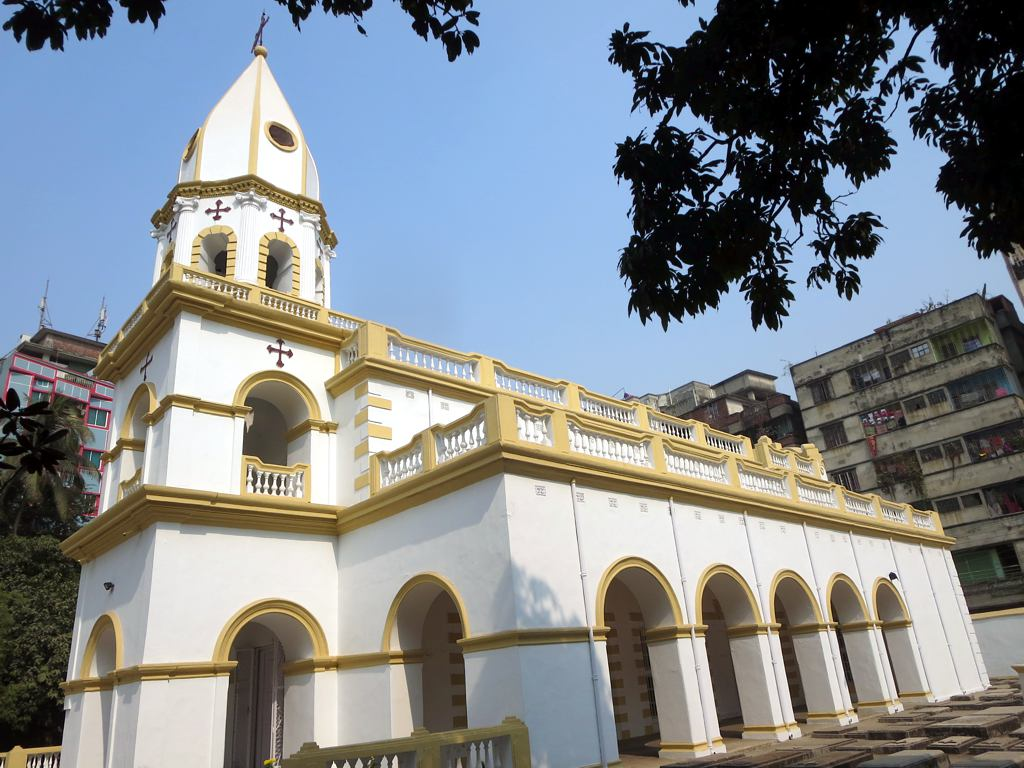
- Dhaka's Armenian Church, built in 1781

Total population
- 488,583-640,000 ▲ (0.30% of the country's population) ▲

Regions with significant populations
- Throughout Bangladesh
- Dhaka Division: 124,349 (0.28%)
- Rajshahi Division: 83,798 (0.41%)
- Chittagong Division: 72,915 (0.22%)
- Rangpur Division: 72,098 (0.41%)
- Mymensingh Division: 56,800 (0.46%)
- Khulna Division: 41,134 (0.24%)
- Sylhet Division: 25,389 (0.23%)
- Barisal Division: 12,072 (0.13%)

Religions
- Christianity

Languages
- Bengali; Other indigenous languages

Christianity is Bangladesh's fourth most followed religion, accounting approximately 0.3% (roughly 488,583) of the nation's population. Together with Buddhism (and other minority groups such as Atheism, Sikhism, Jainism, the Bahá'í Faith and others), Christianity accounts for 1% of the population. Most Christians in Bangladesh adhere to Roman Catholicism and Protestant denominations. The Christian population is primarily composed of Bengali Christians and members of various indigenous ethnic minorities.

Historical Christian Population
Year	Pop.	±%
1951	107,000	—
1961	149,000	+39.3%
1974	215,919	+44.9%
1981	274,481	+27.1%
1991	346,062	+26.1%
2001	388,855	+12.4%
2011	447,009	+15.0%
2022	488,583	+9.3%
Source: Bangladesh government census authority

== History ==
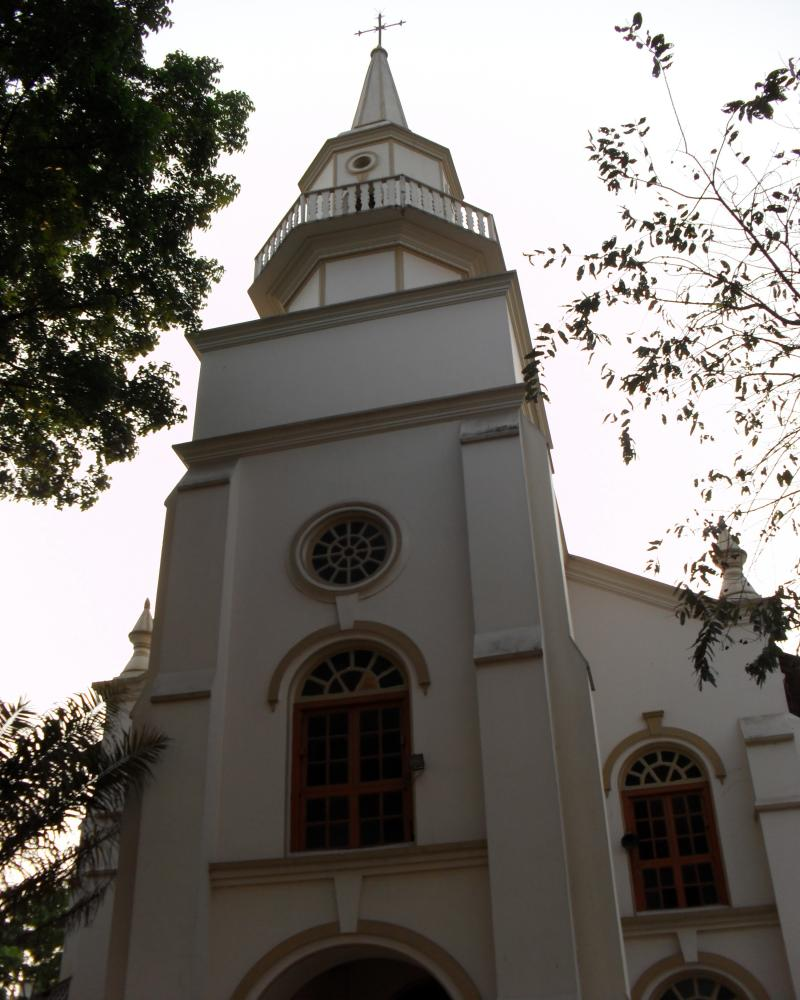
Roman Catholic Archdiocese of Chittagong

The introduction and development of Christianity in South Asia can be traced back to several periods, with the help of several countries and denominations. The earliest connection to Christianity has traditionally been linked back to the arrival of the Apostle Thomas to the Malabar Coast during the first century, in 52 A.D. According to tradition, the Apostle had managed to convert several thousands of Hindu Brahmins, as they were "attracted" to the lifestyle and were "impressed" by Jesus' sacrifice.

Christianity did not have a presence in Bangladesh until the arrival of the Portuguese in 1510 with individuals like Alfonso de Albuquerque and Portuguese missionaries. Albuquerque attempted to spread Christianity by encouraging inter-marriage with native Bengali women, therefore their descendants were the first generations of Christians. By 1514, the Portuguese had obtained the right to preach Christianity in Bengal, thanks to the agreement between the Catholic Pope and the King of Portugal.

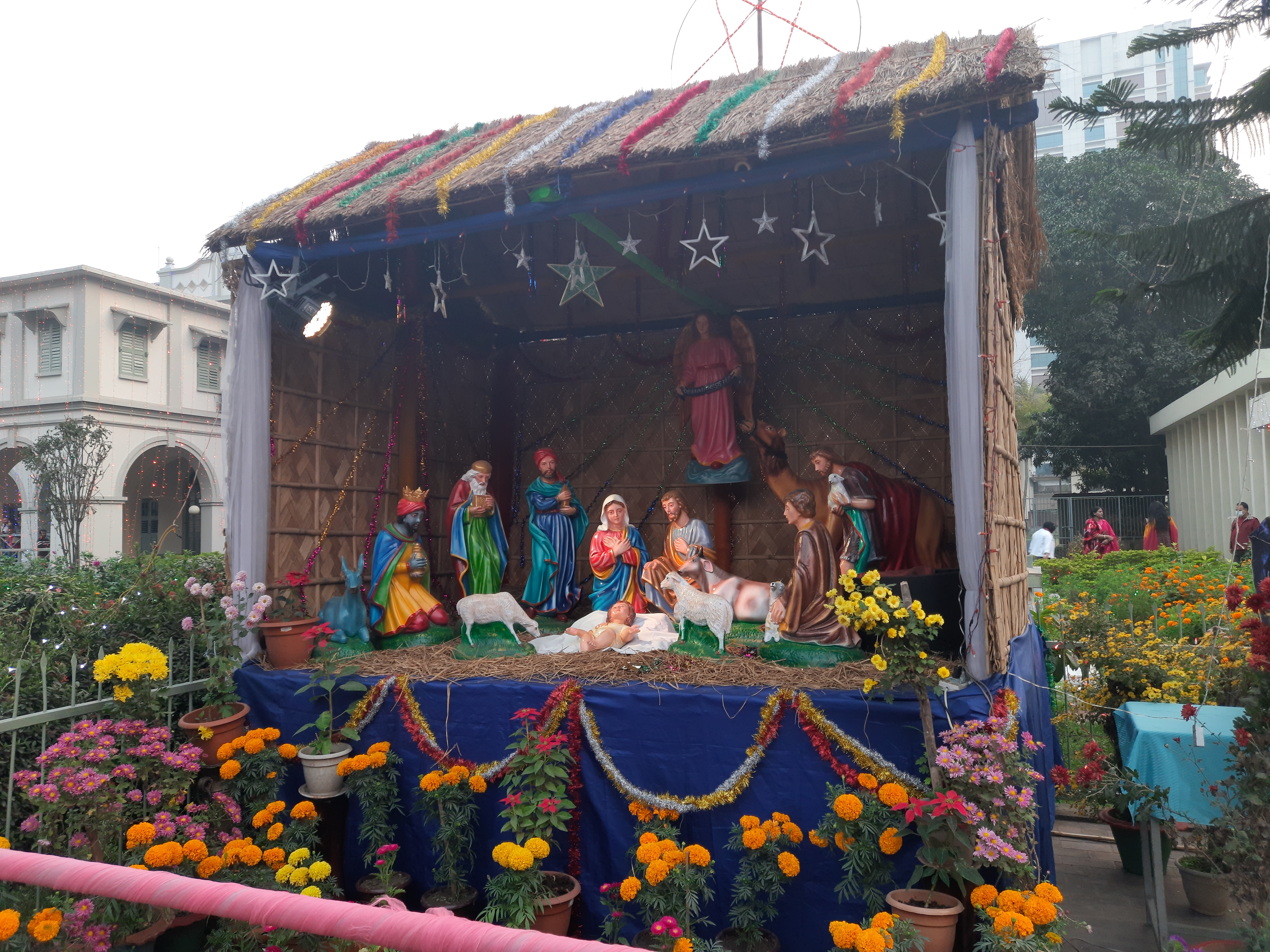
Christmas in Bangladesh

In 1672, Dome Antonio da Rozari, a young Bengali convert, had managed to convert 20,000 low-caste and discriminated Hindus into Christianity. Afterwards, between the seventeenth and eighteenth centuries, Portuguese missionaries were evangelising and preaching in the Bengali language. Soon on, evangelical books and Christian theology were being written in Bengali.

In 1740, the first Protestant, Reverend John Zachariah Kiernander, arrived in Bangladesh. In 1770, he funded and built a Protestant church called "Mission Church" in West Bengal.

By the 18th century, British missionaries, such as William Carey, had built more churches, translated the Bible and other Christian books, and had set up religious schools. British missionaries had also developed Christian newspapers (such as "Digdarshan", "The Gospel Magazine", and "The Christian Mohila") in an effort to spread the gospel.

In more recent times, the rise of Christianity in Bangladesh can be credited to Christian NGOs and charities, who provided humanitarian work after the Independence War in 1971. Since then, these NGOs and charities (see Contributions) have not only assisted with support for emergency relief, healthcare, and education in Bangladesh, but they have also encouraged the practice of reading the Bible.

=== History of churches ===
The first church (in present-day Bangladesh) was officially inaugurated in Jessore, erstwhile Chandecan (now Jessore). The church was named "The Church of the Holy Name of Jesus" and was built by the Jesuits, who were not only given permission, but also financial support and land by the King of Jessore.

The second church was financially supported by the Arakanese King and was built by Andre Boves on 24 June 1600. This church was built in Chittagong and was called "St. John the Baptist Church".

In 1601, the third church was built by Dominicans in the south-east of Chittagong. Eventually these churches were burnt down from attacks by Arakanese buddhists.

=== William Carey and missionaries ===
According to religious studies scholar Sufia M. Uddin, William Carey can be seen as "One of the most important early Christian missionary figures". Carey had arrived in Bangladesh in 1773, where he was financially supported by the Baptist Missionary Society to carry out missionary work. Carey believed his success as a missionary, was due to him learning the Bengali language and therefore being able to translate the gospel.

In 1801, he was able to publish a translation of The New Testament, which was the first translation in any South Asian language. Carey then published a Bengali translation that same year and was also appointed as a professor at Fort William College. Carey, with the assistance of Joshua Marshman and William Ward created Serampore College.

Carey's colleagues and missionary team built a Bengali boys' school and by 1817, they were operating 45 boys' schools. As for girls, in 1818 they opened their first Bengali girls' school and by 1824, they were running 6 girls' schools. These mission-run schools would often attract students with scholarships and accommodation.

Carey also oversaw the works the Bible being translated into more than 34 Indian languages, while the missionaries wrote books and tracts favouring the Christian lifestyle. These books and tracts (such as "Prophet's Testimony of Christ", "God's Punishment of Sin", and "Krishna and Christ Compared") not only emphasised the benefits of Christian life, but reportedly condemned Hindu and Islamic beliefs.

=== Female missionaries ===
In 1822, Miss Mary Anne Cooke was one of the first English female missionaries. Prior to this in 1820, missionary William Ward had encouraged for English women to preach Christianity, in order to connect more with Bengali women. With help from the Christian Missionary Society, Cooke founded 15 girls' schools with around 300 students within Calcutta and Bengal to educate females.

Sister Argerita Bellasiny, Sister Brigida Janella, and Sister Agostina Bigo from Italy were called upon Father Marietti on 17 May 1868 to help with missionary outreach. The three would spread Christianity by going door to door, particularly focusing on poor and vulnerable widows.

=== First Christian martyr ===
Father Francisco Fernandez was the first Bengali Christian martyr; he died on 14 November 1602. He was murdered because he had attempted to save Christian women and children from being captured as slaves by Arakanese Buddhists. He was detained, chained, tortured and beaten to death by Arakanese forces.

== Geographical distribution ==
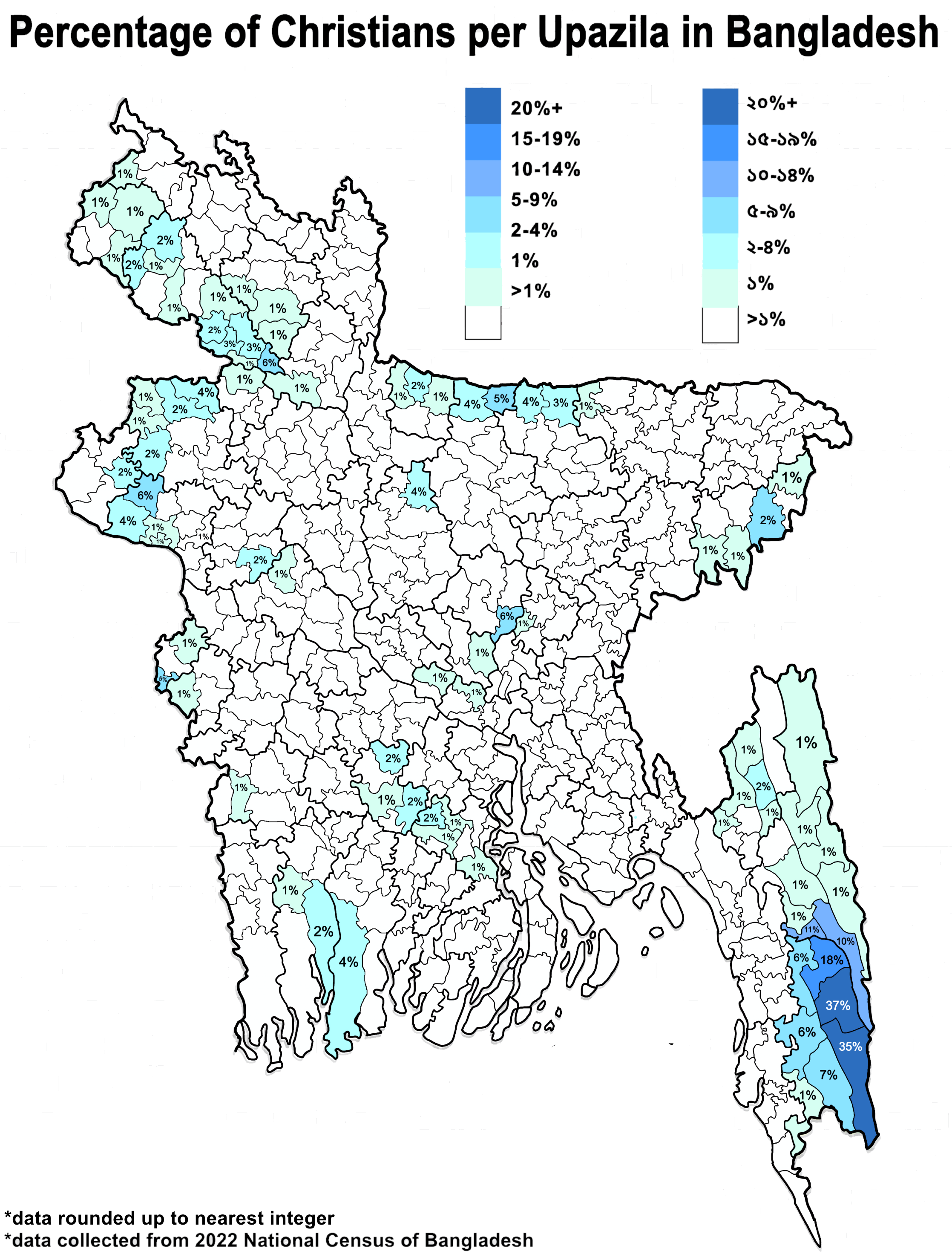
Map of Christians per Upazila in Bangladesh

According to 2022 census, Christianity is followed by 488,583 (0.3%) people in Bangladesh. Bangladeshi Christians mainly belong to Santal, Garo, Khasi, Oraon, Bom, Khyang, Panko, Lushei and other tribes. Some Bengali Christians also live in Dhaka, Gazipur, Chittagong, Barisal, Sylhet and surrounding areas.

Upazila	District	Division	Percentage of Christianity
Ruma Upazila	Bandarban District	Chittagong Division	37.32%
Thanchi Upazila	Bandarban District	Chittagong Division	34.43%
Rowangchhari Upazila	Bandarban District	Chittagong Division	17.83%
Rajasthali Upazila	Rangamati Hill District	Chittagong Division	10.83%
Belaichhari Upazila	Rangamati Hill District	Chittagong Division	9.60%
Alikadam Upazila	Bandarban District	Chittagong Division	6.51%
Lama Upazila	Bandarban District	Chittagong Division	6.24%
Bandarban Sadar Upazila	Bandarban District	Chittagong Division	5.83%
Tanore Upazila	Rajshahi District	Rajshahi Division	5.69%
Kaliganj Upazila	Gazipur District	Dhaka Division	5.41%
Ghoraghat Upazila	Dinajpur District	Rangpur Division	5.40%
Mujibnagar Upazila	Meherpur District	Khulna Division	4.73%
Dhobaura Upazila	Mymensingh District	Mymensingh Division	4.68%
Madhupur Upazila	Tangail District	Dhaka Division	4.28%
Haluaghat Upazila	Mymensingh District	Mymensingh Division	3.84%
Godagari Upazila	Rajshahi District	Rajshahi Division	3.83%
Durgapur Upazila	Netrokona District	Mymensingh Division	3.68%
Dhamoirhat Upazila	Naogaon District	Rajshahi Division	3.09%
Mongla Upazila	Bagerhat District	Khulna Division	3.02%
Nawabganj Upazila	Dinajpur District	Rangpur Division	3.00%
Birampur Upazila	Dinajpur District	Rangpur Division	2.95%
Kalmakanda Upazila	Netrokona District	Mymensingh Division	2.87%
Dacope Upazila	Khulna District	Khulna Division	2.12%
Agailjhara Upazila	Barisal District	Barisal Division	2.12%
Patnitala Upazila	Naogaon District	Rajshahi Division	2.09%
Fulbari Upazila	Dinajpur District	Rangpur Division	2.04%
Nachole Upazila	Chapainawabganj District	Rajshahi Division	2.03%
Baraigram Upazila	Natore District	Rajshahi Division	1.90%
Jhenaigati Upazila	Sherpur District	Mymensingh Division	1.79%
Niamatpur Upazila	Naogaon District	Rajshahi Division	1.78%
Khagrachhari Sadar Upazila	Khagrachhari District	Chittagong Division	1.75%
Kulaura Upazila	Moulvibazar District	Sylhet Division	1.70%
Birganj Upazila	Dinajpur District	Rangpur Division	1.54%
Panchbibi Upazila	Joypurhat District	Rajshahi Division	1.43%
Bochaganj Upazila	Dinajpur District	Rangpur Division	1.43%
Hakimpur Upazila	Dinajpur District	Rangpur Division	1.36%
Porsha Upazila	Naogaon District	Rajshahi Division	1.35%
Sreemangal Upazila	Moulvibazar District	Sylhet Division	1.33%
Nawabganj Upazila	Dhaka District	Dhaka Division	1.29%
Nalitabari Upazila	Sherpur District	Mymensingh Division	1.27%
Atwari Upazila	Panchagarh District	Rangpur Division	1.09%
Kaptai Upazila	Rangamati Hill District	Chittagong Division	1.02%
Madhyanagar Upazila	Sunamganj District	Sylhet Division	1.02%
Dinajpur Sadar Upazila	Dinajpur District	Rangpur Division	1.01%
Pirganj Upazila	Thakurgaon District	Rangpur Division	1.00%
Others			<1%

== Contributions ==
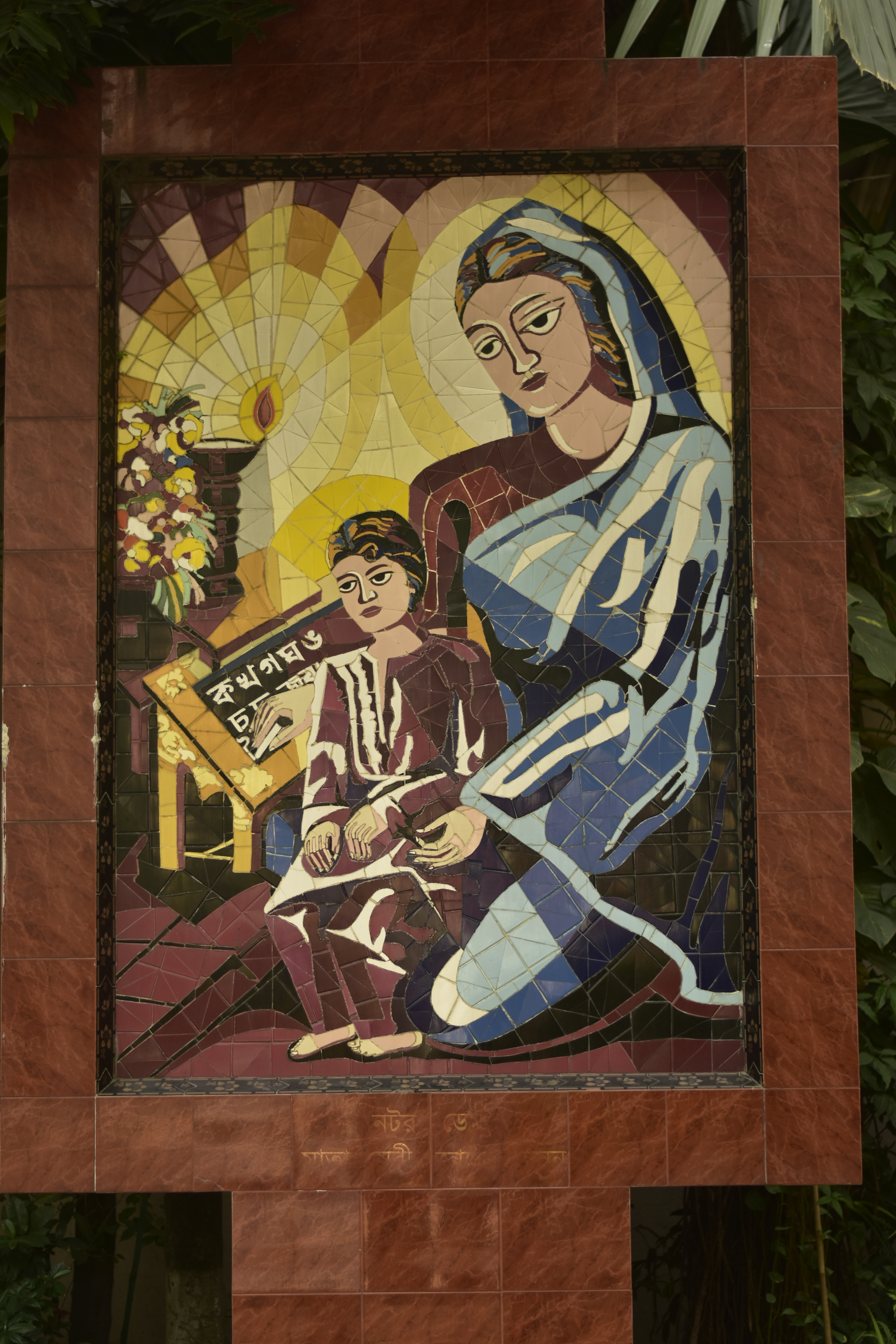
Photo of Mother Mary at the entrance of Notre Dame College

Christians in Bangladesh have historically played a significant role in education and healthcare. They established some of the country's well-known schools, colleges, and hospitals.

Having worked in Bangladesh as a missionary since 1952, Richard William Timm belonging to the Congregation of Holy Cross won the Ramon Magsaysay Award for Peace and International Understanding, the Asian Nobel Prize, in 1987 in recognition of his work as a teacher, as a biologist studying plant-parasitic worms, and with Caritas Bangladesh on relief efforts.

In the 1990s, many people opposed the aid of Christian NGOs, and therefore there was a spike in the number of protests and violence opposing the religious influence of Christian NGOs. Up to 52 NGOs were considered to be "anti-Islamic", with the intentions of "proselytising" the Islamic nation to Christianity, targeting the vulnerable; the outcasts, the uneducated, and the poor.

== Persecution ==
With the rise of Islamic fundamentalist movements, Christians in Bangladesh often face the pressure from Islamist terrorist groups due to persecution and harassment from the wider Muslim community. In 2019, several churches, such as Mohandi Assemblies of God church, were either burnt down or destroyed. To be safe from such attacks and to prevent such incidents, Christians would gather in secret or in small houses to practice their religion. Additionally, in 2020, it is alleged that several Christians were detained by police for "unlawful conversion".

Conditions have improved in recent years as Bangladesh moved from place 35 on the World Watch List of Christian persecution in 2015 to place 48 in 2019. However, a rise of violence against Christians sent the country to number 30 on the list in 2023. Persecution of Christians in Bangladesh has since intensified at the hands of radical Islamists and extremist Muslims. In May 2024, Prime Minister Sheikh Hasina made allegations of a Christian plot to "carve out" an independent Christian country in Bangladesh and Myanmar. The Archbishop of Dhaka, Bejoy Nicephorus D'Cruze, categorically denied the allegations.

In 2023, the country was scored 2 out of 4 for religious freedom.

=== Other attacks on Christians ===
- On 3 June 2001, there was a bomb attack during a rally in a Catholic church located in Baniarchor; the attack had killed nine individuals.
- An Italian aid worker, Cesare Tavella was shot and killed in 2015. Parolari Piero, an Italian priest and doctor was shot several times in 2015.
- In 2016, a Christian businessman named Sunil Gomes was hacked to death.
- On 1 July 2016, 7 Italian citizens were killed during Holey Artisan attack.
- Pastor Luke Sarkar of Faith Bible Church was attacked and stabbed on 5 October 2015 and his throat was cut with a sharp knife but ended up surviving with injuries.
- In the early 2020s, attacks on minorities increased, Christians were also targeted.

== Denominations ==
=== Catholic Dioceses ===
There are two Catholic archdioceses and six Catholic dioceses in Bangladesh with some 400,000 Catholics. Each diocese is led by its own local bishop. Cardinal Patrick D'Rozario is the highest Catholic official.

The Archdiocese of Dhaka comprises:

- The diocese of Dinajpur
- The diocese of Mymensingh
- The diocese of Rajshahi
- The diocese of Sylhet

The archdiocese of Chittagong comprises:

- The diocese of Barisal
- The diocese of Khulna

The diocese of Dhaka was created in 1952 and Rev. James D. Blair was assigned as the first Bishop (Markham, Hawkins IV, Terry & Steffensen, 2013). Following Blair, the first indigenous Bishop of the Diocese of Dhaka was assigned to Rev. B.D. Mondal. By the late 1980s, it was decided that a second diocese was needed, and this was established in Kusthia in 1990; a third diocese was established in 2017.

=== Protestant denominations ===
- Assemblies of God
- Bangladesh Evangelical Revival Church
- Bangladesh Baptist Church Fellowship
- Bangladesh Baptist Church Sangha
- Bangladesh Evangelical Church
- Bangladesh Gospel Baptist Church
- Bangladesh Lutheran Church
- Christian Brethren
- Church of Bangladesh (United church of Anglicans, Presbyterians, and others; member of the Anglican Communion)
- Church of God (Anderson)
- Church of the Nazarene
- Garo Baptist Convention
- House Church of Bangladesh
- Isa-e Church
- Jehovah's Witnesses
- Messianic Mosques (similar to Messianic Judaism in the West movement which combinated Christian faith with Muslim culture)
- Presbyterian Church of Bangladesh
- Seventh-day Adventist Church

=== National Council of Churches in Bangladesh ===
The National Council of Churches in Bangladesh (or, Jatiya Church Parishad of Bangladesh; Bengali: জাতীয় চার্চ পরিষদ বাংলাদেশ, Translation: National Church Council Bangladesh) is a Christian ecumenical organization founded in Bangladesh in 1949 as the East Pakistan Christian Council. The organization serves as a unifying platform for Christians of various denominations, working towards solidarity, cooperation, and the well-being of the Christian community in the context of Bangladesh's diverse religious landscape. It is a member of the World Council of Churches and the Christian Conference of Asia. In 2002, it led public debate on the reform of Bangladeshi personal law applied to Christians.

== Christian theological education ==
There are 16 Christian theological institutions in Bangladesh:

- A G Bible College (Assemblies of God) was created in 1995
- Agape College (Baptist) was created in 2003
- Bangladesh Institution of Christian Theology (inter-denominational) was created in 1996
- Bangladesh Theological Seminary (inter-denominational) was created in 1989
- Centre for Religious Studies (Presbyterian) was created in 2004
- Christian Discipleship Centre (inter-denominational) was created in 1979
- College of Christian Theology in Bangladesh (inter-denominational) was created in 1968
- Faith Bible School was created in 2002
- Gloria Theological Seminary (inter-denominational) was created in 1996
- Grace Presbyterian Theological Seminary (inter-denominational) was created in 2004
- Holy Spirit Major Seminary (Catholic) was created in 1973
- Isa-e Training Institute (Protestant) was created in 2006
- Methodist Theological Seminary (Methodist) was created in 1992
- St. Andrews Theological Seminary (Anglican) was created in 1978
- St. Joseph Seminary (Roman Catholic) was created in 1948
- The Salvation Army Officer Training College was created in 1993

== Christian media ==
The Catholic weekly magazine, Weekly Pratibeshi (Bengali: সাপ্তাহিক প্রতিবেশী; Translation: Weekly Neighbourhood) was founded in 1941 as Ranikhong Mission Chithi, a monthly parish bulletin. In the mid-1940s, it took its present name and moved to Dhaka from Mymensingh. The magazine is one of the oldest Bengali and Catholic newspapers. In 2013, Pratibeshi launched an online news site with a focus on broad news coverage.

Radio Veritas Asia began their Bengali service in 1980. It is jointly produced in Dhaka and Kolkata.

== Christian education in Bangladesh ==
- Notre Dame University Bangladesh
- Bangladesh Adventist Nursing College - BANC
- Divine Mercy Nursing Institute
- Notre Dame College, Dhaka
- Notre Dame College, Mymensingh
- St. Joseph Higher Secondary School
- YWCA Higher Secondary Girls School
- St. Gregory's High School and College
- St. Francis Xavier's Girls' High School
- St Francis Xavier's Green Herald International School
- A. G. Church School
- Holy Cross College, Dhaka
- Holy Cross Girls' High School (Dhaka)
- Saint Philip's High School and College
- Saint Placid's High School
- St. Peter International Mission School
- Bandura Holy Cross School & College
- St. Euphrasies Girls' High School And College
- St. Theclas Girls' High School

== Notable Bangladeshi Christians ==
=== Industry ===
- Samson Chowdhury, founder of Square Pharmaceuticals, Bangladesh
- Tapan Chowdhury, businessman
- Anjan Chowdhury

=== Arts ===
- Andrew Kishore, Bangladeshi playback singer
- Robin Ghosh, Bangladeshi playback singer and film music composer
- Tony Dias, Bangladeshi television actor and director
- Patrick D'Costa, Bangladeshi first Christian professional journalist
- George Lincoln D'Costa, Bangladeshi metal singer
- Andrew Biraj, Bangladeshi photojournalist

=== Bangladesh Army ===
- Brigadier John Gomes
- Capt. Shuvo Sanjib Ghagra, Gabindapur, Kalmakanda, Netrakona - Serving.

=== Sports ===
- Hemanta Vincent Biswas, Bangladesh national team: footballer
- Maria Manda, Bangladesh national team: footballer
- Sheuli Azim, Bangladesh national team: footballer

=== Medicine ===
- Dr. Neville Anthony D'Rozario, Bangladeshi physician, community leader, and author

=== Politicians ===
- Hubert Costa, Bangladeshi-Polish member of parliament
- Promode Mankin, the First Catholic and the first member of the country's Christian community to become a government minister in Bangladesh (as a member of the Bangladesh Awami League) and formerly representing Mymensingh-1 (constituency) (whom Mankin's son became his successor)
- Jewel Areng, son of Promode Mankin, youngest member of parliament (as a member of the Bangladesh Awami League) and the only Catholic, representing Mymensingh-1 (constituency) (whose father was also his predecessor) from 18 July 2016 to 10 January 2024.
- Gloria Jharna Sarker, Bangladesh's first female Christian member of parliament (2019)
- Anna Minj, Bangladesh's first ethnic Oraon Christian lawmaker of parliament-2026

== See also ==
- Islam in Bangladesh
- Hinduism in Bangladesh
- Buddhism in Bangladesh
- Sikhism in Bangladesh
- Christianity in India
- Christianity in the Middle East
- Christianity in Myanmar
- Religion in Bangladesh
- List of Bangladeshi Christians
- National Council of Churches in Bangladesh
