= Tafazzal Hossain Khan =

Bangladeshi politician (1920–2022)

- তোফাজ্জেল হোসেন খান

Member of Parliament for Mymensingh-1
- In office 2 April 1979 – 24 March 1982
- Preceded by: Md. Delwar Hossain
- Succeeded by: Md. Emdadul Haque

Personal details
- Born: 21 October 1920 Haluaghat, Mymensingh, Bengal Presidency, British Raj
- Died: 16 January 2022 (aged 101) Dhaka, Bangladesh
- Party: Bangladesh Nationalist Party

Tafazzal Hossain Khan (known as T. H. Khan; 21 October 1920 – 16 January 2022) was a Bangladeshi politician who served as Jatiya Sangsad member representing the Mymensingh-1 constituency for the Bangladesh Nationalist Party.

== Life and career ==
Khan was born on 21 October 1920 in Haluaghat Upazila of Mymensingh district. He passed Matriculation from Phulpur High School in Mymensingh and Intermediate from Ananda Mohan College. He completed a law degree at Dhaka University.

Khan was elected to parliament from Mymensingh-1 as a Bangladesh Nationalist Party candidate in 1979. He served as the president of Supreme Court Bar Association and the Nationalist Lawyers' Forum.

Khan was married to Raushan Ara Jobaida Khanam. They had three sons and one daughter. Their eldest son Afzal H. Khan was also elected to parliament. Jobaida died in 2011 at the age of 69.

Khan turned 100 in October 2020, and died from pneumonia in Dhaka on 16 January 2022, at the age of 101. He was buried at Outi, his ancestral village in Haluaghat Upazila of Mymensingh District.
