= Panchhari =

Panchhari may refer to:

- Panchhari Upazila, an upazila of Khagrachhari District
- Panchhari Union, a union of Panchhari Upazila under Khagrachhari District
