= Salman Omar Rubel =

Bangladeshi politician

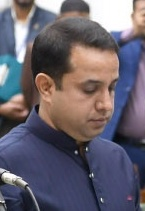
- Rubel in 2026

Members of Parliament
- Incumbent
- Assumed office 17 February 2026
- Preceded by: Mahmudul Haque Sayem
- Constituency: Mymensingh-1

Personal details
- Born: Mymensingh
- Party: Independent politician
- Occupation: Politician

Salman Omar Rubel is a Bangladeshi independent politician. He was elected as the member of parliament for the Mymensingh-1 constituency in the 2026 Bangladeshi general election held on 12 February 2026.

== Career ==
He was expelled from the Bangladesh Nationalist Party.
