= Gloria Jharna Sarker =

Bangladeshi politician

- গ্লোরিয়া ঝর্ণা সরকার

Member of the Bangladesh Parliament for Women's Reserved Seat-30
- In office 16 February 2019 – 29 January 2024
- Preceded by: Fazilatunnesa Bappy
- Succeeded by: Sheikh Anar Koli Putul

Personal details
- Born: 10 January 1979 (age 47) Laudubi, Dacope Upazila, Khulna District, Bangladesh
- Party: Bangladesh Awami League
- Spouse: Mintu Mohonta
- Children: 2
- Education: B.A; L.L.M
- Profession: Lawyer; politician

Gloria Jharna Sarkar is a Bangladeshi politician and lawyer who was elected in 2019 to a seat reserved for women in the Bangladesh Parliament.

She is the first Catholic woman to be in the parliament.

Before her, only two Christian men were elected to parliament. Promode Mankin, a Catholic, was an MP between 2009 and 2014 as well as social affairs minister between 2009 and 2012. His son, Jewel Areng, was elected for the first time in 2016 in a by-election and re-elected in December 2018's general election.

== Biography ==
Gloria Jharna Sarker was born on 10 January 1979 in Laudubi village of Dacope Upazila, Khulna District, Bangladesh. Her father is Shushanta Sarkar, and her mother is Supriya Renu Shikhari. She earned a B.A. and an L.L.M.

She has a long history of student activism in Catholic associations and women's groups such as the Young Women's Christian Association, the Bangladesh Christian Association, and the Bangladesh Hindu Buddhist Christian Unity Council.

She had been present and was wounded in the 21st August grenade attack on the meeting of the Bangladesh Awami League, where 24 people were killed and about 300 injured.

I am from a coastal area where people are neglected and struggle to survive. I will work for needy children, women and young people.
