= List of Bangladeshi Christians =

Christians comprise almost 0.4% of the population of bangladesh. The following is a list of notable people from christian background:

== Literature ==
- Michael Madhusudan Dutta, he was born in Jessore, Bangladesh

== Music ==
- Robin Ghosh
- Andrew Kishore
- Samar Das
- Robin Ghosh
- Adit Ozbert
- George Lincoln D'Costa, Bangladeshi Metal Singer

== Films ==
- Catherine Masud, director
- Olivia Gomez, actress
- Puja Agnes Cruze, actress

== Television ==
- Tony Dias
- Priya Dias
- Dipannita Martin
- Loren Mendes
- Lara Lotus
- Allen Shuvro
- Blaise Costa

== Magic ==
Jewel Aich

== Philanthropy ==
- Samson Chowdhury

== Politics ==
- Promode Mankin, former Minister of Social Welfare Affairs and member of parliament
- Jewel Areng, member of parliament
