= Mahmudul Haque Sayem =

Bangladeshi politician

Member of Parliament
- In office 11 January 2024 – 6 August 2024
- Constituency: Mymensingh-1

Personal details
- Party: Bangladesh Awami League
- Occupation: Politician

Mahmudul Haque Sayem is a Bangladeshi politician from Mymensingh District. He is a former Member of Parliament from the Mymensingh-1 constituency and a former Chairman of Haluaghat Upazila Parishad.

In 2024, following the fall of the Awami League government amid the July uprising, President Mohammad Shahabuddin dissolved the National Parliament, resulting in the termination of his membership as a Member of Parliament.

== Early life ==
Mahmudul Haque Sayem was born in Haluaghat Upazila of Mymensingh District.

== Career ==
Sayem won the election by contesting as an independent candidate from Mymensingh-1 constituency on 7 January 2024. He won by getting 93 thousand 531 votes. His nearest rival, previous Member of Parliament Jewel Arang got 73 thousand 892 votes.

Before the election, he resigned from the post of Haluaghat Upazila Chairperson to elect MP.
