= Mymensingh-1 =

Constituency of Bangladesh's Jatiya Sangsad

Coordinates: 25.12°N 90.34°E

- Constituency for the Jatiya Sangsad
- District: Mymensingh District
- Division: Mymensingh Division
- Electorate: 377,296 (2018)

Current constituency
- Created: 1973
- Party: Independent
- Member: Salman Omar Rubel
- ← 145 Sherpur-3 147 Mymensingh-2 →

Mymensingh-1 is a constituency represented in the Jatiya Sangsad (National Parliament) of Bangladesh since 2026 by independent politician Salman Omar Rubel.

== Boundaries ==
The constituency encompasses Haluaghat Upazila and Dhobaura Upazila.

== History ==
The constituency was created for the first general elections in newly independent Bangladesh, held in 1973.

Ahead of the 2008 general election, the Election Commission redrew constituency boundaries to reflect population changes revealed by the 2001 Bangladesh census. The 2008 redistricting altered the boundaries of the constituency.

== Members of Parliament ==
Election	Member	Party
1973	Md. Delwar Hossain	Awami League
1979	Tafazzal Hossain Khan	Bangladesh Nationalist Party
1986	Md. Emdadul Haque	Jatiya Party
1991	Promode Mankin	Awami League
Jun 1996	Afzal H. Khan	Bangladesh Nationalist Party
2001	Promode Mankin	Awami League
2016 by-election	Jewel Areng	Awami League
2024	Mahmudul Haque Sayem	Independent
2026	Salman Omar Rubel	Independent

== Elections ==
=== Elections in the 2010s ===
Promode Mankin died in May 2016. Jewel Areng, his son, was elected in a July by-election.

Mymensingh-1 by-election, 2016
Party	Candidate	Votes	%	±%
AL	Jewel Areng (Note: Some sources report a slightly higher 2016 vote count for Areng, 170,270.)	170,234	91.6	+31.5
Independent	Selima Khatun	14,338	7.7	N/A
JP(E)	Sohrab Uddin Khan (Note: The only sources that report on the third place finisher are internally inconsistent, but the discrepancies in their figures are not large enough to change the outcome.)	1,586	0.9	N/A
Majority		155,846	83.8	+62.1
Turnout		185,896	51.3	−44.3
AL hold				

Promode Mankin was re-elected unopposed in the 2014 general election after opposition parties withdrew their candidacies in a boycott of the election.

=== Elections in the 2000s ===
General Election 2008: Mymensingh-1
Party	Candidate	Votes	%	±%
AL	Promode Mankin	142,981	60.1	+21.9
BNP	Afzal H. Khan	91,345	38.4	+5.5
IAB	Md. Ali Akbar	3,487	1.5	N/A
Majority		51,636	21.7	+16.4
Turnout		237,813	95.6	+20.3
AL hold				

General Election 2001: Mymensingh-1
Party	Candidate	Votes	%	±%
AL	Promode Mankin	47,873	38.2	+7.2
BNP	Afzal H. Khan	41,280	32.9	+1.9
IJOF	Ali Azgar	35,770	28.5	N/A
Independent	Md. Habibur Rahman	416	0.3	N/A
Majority		6,593	5.3	−6.9
Turnout		125,339	75.3	+5.4
AL gain from BNP				

=== Elections in the 1990s ===
General Election June 1996: Mymensingh-1
Party	Candidate	Votes	%	±%
BNP	Afzal H.Khan	42,349	43.2	+20.1
AL	Promode Mankin	30,410	31.0	−5.6
JP(E)	Md. Emdadul Haque	22,259	22.7	−3.4
Jamaat	Md. Hafizur Rahman	2,015	2.1	N/A
IOJ	Md. Abu Sayed	629	0.6	N/A
Zaker Party	Abdus Samad Miah	333	0.3	+0.2
NAP	Md. Dewan Sirajul Islam Sarnali	125	0.1	N/A
Majority		11,939	12.2	+1.7
Turnout		98,120	69.9	+17.8
BNP gain from AL				

General Election 1991: Mymensingh-1
Party	Candidate	Votes	%	±%
AL	Promode Mankin	27,191	36.6	
JP(E)	Md. Emdadul Haq	19,390	26.1	
BNP	Tafazzal Hossain Khan	17,171	23.1	
Jatiya Samajtantrik Dal-JSD	Md. Ali Azgar	9,878	13.3	
Zaker Party	A. Samad	689	0.9	
Majority		7,801	10.5	
Turnout		74,319	52.1	
AL gain from JP(E)				
