= Panchhari Upazila =

Panchhari পানছড়ি
- Upazila
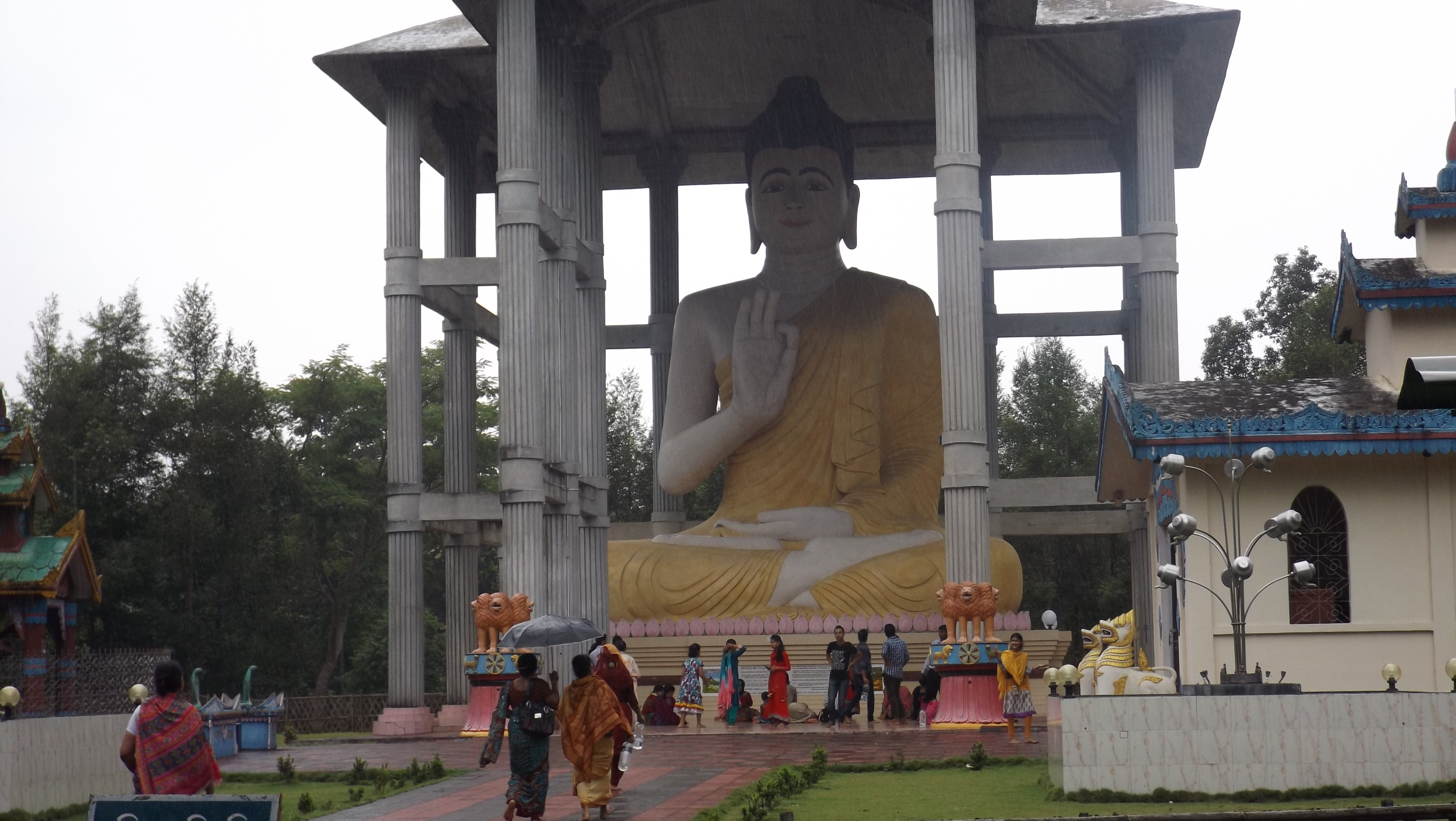
- Buddha Statue in Panchhari

- Coordinates: 23°17.4′N 91°54′E
- Country: Bangladesh
- Division: Chittagong
- District: Khagrachhari

Area
  - Total: 334.10 km^{2} (129.00 sq mi)

Population (2022)
  - Total: 68,678
  - Density: 205.56/km^{2} (532.40/sq mi)
- Time zone: UTC+6 (BST)
- Postal code: 4410
- Website: Govt. official Site Official Map of Panchhari

Panchhari Upazila mauza geocode map

Panchhari (Bengali: পানছড়ি) is an upazila of Khagrachari District in the Division of Chittagong, Bangladesh.

== Geography ==
Panchhari is located at 23.2903°N 91.9000°E. It has 14,154 households and total area 334.10 km^{2}.

== History ==
Panchhari is the site of a massacre by Shanti Bahini, the armed wing of the separatist Parbatya Chattagram Jana Samhati Samiti party in 1996.

== Demographics ==
According to the 2022 Bangladeshi census, Panchhari Upazila had 17,159 households and a population of 68,678. 9.19% of the population were under 5 years of age. Panchhari had a literacy rate (age 7 and over) of 68.01%: 74.79% for males and 61.28% for females, and a sex ratio of 99.66 males for every 100 females. 33,540 (48.84%) lived in urban areas.

=== Ethnicity and religion ===
Religions in Panchhari Upazila (2022)
Religion	Percent
Buddhism	47.25%
Islam	30.78%
Hinduism	21.46%
Christianity	0.50%
Other or not stated	0.10%

Population by religion in Union
Union	Muslim	Buddhist	Hindu	Others
Chengi	154	7,173	1,482	111
Latiban	67	5,224	4,822	146
Logang	2,472	6,866	3,068	13
Panchhari	11,378	9,938	3,260	42
Ultachhari	7,068	3,248	2,109	32

🟩 Muslim majority 🟨 Buddhist majority

As of the 2022 Bangladeshi census, Panchhari upazila had a population of 68,678. The ethnic population was 46,000 (66.98%), of which Chakma were 30,270, Tripura 13,295 and Marma 2,143.

Ethnicity in Panchhari (2022)
1. Chakma (44.1%)
2. Bengali (33.0%)
3. Tripura (19.4%)
4. Marma (3.12%)
5. Others (0.42%)

Population by ethnicity in Union
Union	Bengali	Chakma	Tripura	Marma	Others
Chengi	182	7,035	1,490	206	7
Latiban	72	4,335	4,899	950	3
Logang	2,572	6,759	2,901	114	73
Panchhari	12,742	9,298	1,926	459	203
Ultachhari	7,105	2,843	2,079	424	6

🟩 Bengali majority 🟨 Chakma majority 🟧 Tripura majority

== Administration ==
Panchhari Upazila is divided into five union parishads: Chengi, Latiban, Logang, Panchhari and Ultachhari. The union parishads are subdivided into 7 mauzas and 220 villages.

Chairman: Sarbottom Chakma

Vice Chairman:

Woman Vice Chairman:

Upazila Nirbahi Officer (UNO):

== See also ==
- Upazilas of Bangladesh
- Districts of Bangladesh
- Divisions of Bangladesh
