= Chengi Union =

Union of Khagrachhari District, Chittagong, Bangladesh

Chengi চেঙ্গী
- Union
- Interactive map of Chengi
- Country: Bangladesh
- Division: Chittagong Division
- District: Khagrachhari District
- Upazila: Panchhari Upazila

Area
  - Total: 59.57 km^{2} (23.00 sq mi)

Population (2022)
  - Total: 8,920
  - Density: 150/km^{2} (388/sq mi)
- Time zone: UTC+6 (BST)
- Postal code: 4410
- Website: chengiup.khagrachhari.gov.bd

Chengi Union is a union of Panchhari Upazila under Khagrachhari District.

== Demography ==
According to 2022 census, total population of the Union are 8,920. Among them, 154 are Muslim, 7,173 are Buddhist, 1,842 are Hindu, 111 are Christian and 3 are follower of others religion.

Religion-2022
1. Buddhism (80.4%)
2. Hinduism (16.6%)
3. Islam (1.73%)
4. Christianity (1.24%)
5. Others (0.00%)

== Ethnicity ==
This Union is home to a variety of different ethnic groups. Among them, 182 are Bengali, 7,035 are Chakma, 1,490 are Tripura, 206 are Marma and 7 are of others ethnic groups.

Ethnicity-2022
1. Chakma (78.9%)
2. Tripura (16.7%)
3. Marma (2.31%)
4. Bengali (2.04%)
5. Others (0.08%)
