= Ghoraghat Upazila =

Upazila in Dinajpur District, Bangladesh

Ghoraghat Upazila ঘোড়াঘাট উপজেলা Nusratabad
- Upazila of Bangladesh
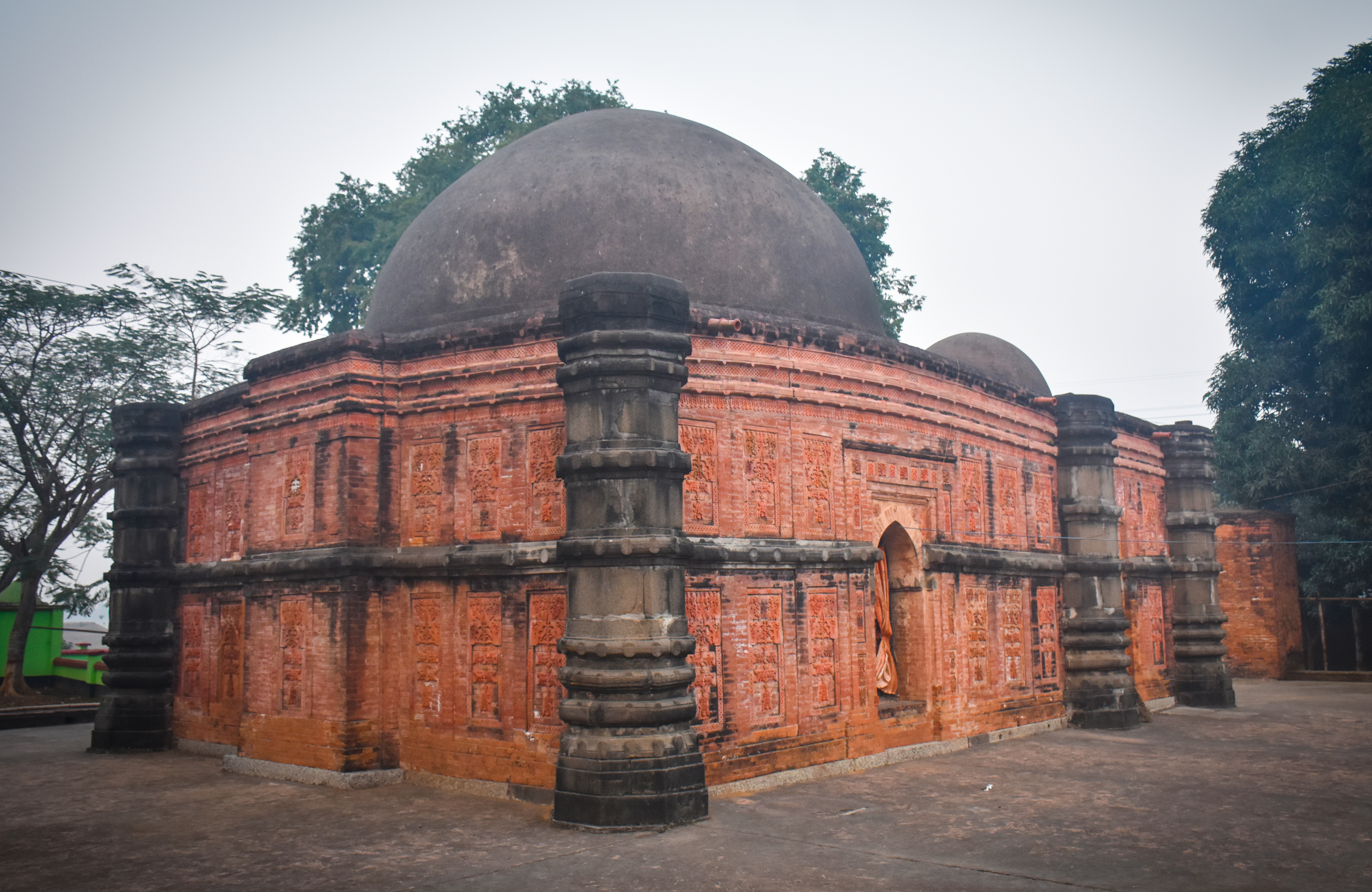
- Sura Mosque in Ghoraghat

- Coordinates: 25°14.7′N 89°13′E
- Country: Bangladesh
- Division: Rangpur Division
- District: Dinajpur District
- Establishment: 1203 (823 years ago)(During the time of Muhammad bin Bakhtiyar Khalji)
- Thana: 1895
- Upazilla: 1984

Government
  - Chief Executive Officer: Muhammad Rafikul Islam

Area
  - Total: 148.67 km^{2} (57.40 sq mi)

Population (2022)
  - Total: 131,413
  - Density: 883.92/km^{2} (2,289.4/sq mi)
- Time zone: UTC+6 (BST)
- Postal code: 5290
- Website: Official website of Ghoraghat

Ghoraghat Upazila (Bengali: ঘোড়াঘাট উপজেলা also named Nuṣratābad), is an upazila of Dinajpur District in the Division of Rangpur, Bangladesh.

== History ==
Ghoraghat was established in the time of Muhammad bin Bakhtiyar Khalji (see Blochmanu's Contr., J.A.S,1873, p. 215, Tabaqat-i-Nasiri, p. 156, Ain-i-Akbari, Vol. II, p. 135 and Vol. I, p. 370). After the historical conquest of Nabadwip from Lakshman Sen in 1203 and the conquest of principal city Gaur, Ikhtiyar al-Dīn Muḥammad Khalji left the town of Devkot in 1206 to attack Tibet, leaving Ali Mardan Khalji in Ghoraghat. The old Musalman military outpost of Deocote or Devkot near Gangarampur was in this Sarkar. As soon as the Muslims had made themselves masters of Gaur, they established two frontier posts, one at Dumdumma, on the bank of river Punarbhaba and another at Ghoraghat. A mosque in Dumdumma bears an inscription recording that it was built by Zafar Khan Bahram Iztin in the reign of Kai Kaos Shah in the year 697 A.H.(1297 AD).

The Ain-i-Akbari lists Ghoraghat as one of the 19 sarkars of Bengal Subah, resulting from Raja Todar Mal's fiscal reorganisation of the province. Sarkar Ghoraghat comprised present-day southern Rangpur District, southeastern Dinajpur District, and northern Bogra District. It had 84 mahals in its territory, of which Irfan Habib was able to locate 24. The town of Ghoraghat was one of these; the Ain lists it as Balda Nuṣratābad, or "the town of Nuṣratābad" (Nuṣratābad was another name for Ghoraghat at the time). A second mahal, called Bari Ghorāghāṭ, comprised the rural district around the city. The Ain lists Balda Nuṣratābad with an assessed revenue of 336,445 dams and Bari Ghorāghāṭ with a revenue of 165,827 dams.

Later it became Chakla of Ghoraghat. The Sarkar produced much raw silk, revenue Rs.202,077.

After the battle of Patna, 982 A.H.(1574 AD), when Daud retired to Orissa, (Badaoni, p. 184, Vol. II), his generals Kalapahar and Babu Mankli proceeded to Ghoraghat, (Badaoni, p. 192). Akbar's general, Majnun Khan, died at Ghoraghat.

Being the northern frontier district skirting Koch-Behar, numerous colonies of Afghan and Mughal chiefs were planted there under the feudal system, with large jagir lands under each. Bhim Narain, Rajah of Kuch Behar used to regularly pay tribute to the Emperor Shah Jahan, but that during the chaos which arose owing to Emperor's illness, and after the death of Sultan Shuja in February 1661 there was anarchy in the region. Bhim Narain became daring and refused to pay tribute and with a large force attacked Ghoraghat. In the same year (on 17th Rabiul-Awwal 1072 A.H) the Khan-i-Khinan (Muazzam Khan) set out from Khizrpur (which has been identified to be a place close to Narayanganj) with war-vessels, for the conquest of Koch-Behar. The Rajah (Bhim Narain) fled to Bhutan, his minister Bholanath fled to the Murang, and the Imperialists stormed Kuch-Behar town, and named it Alamgirnagar.

Ghoraghat thana was established in 1895 and was turned into an upazila in 1984.

== Geography ==
It was primarily founded as a thana in 1895 and converted into an upazila in 1984.

Ghoraghat is located at 25.2458°N 89.2167°E. It has 17535 house holds and a total area of 148.67 km^{2}.

== Demographics ==
Religions in Ghoraghat Upazila (2022)
Religion	Percent
Islam	86.93%
Hinduism	6.97%
Christianity	5.40%
Other or not stated	0.70%

According to the 2022 Bangladeshi census, Ghoraghat Upazila had 35,183 households and a population of 131,413. 8.63% of the population were under 5 years of age. Ghoraghat had a literacy rate (age 7 and over) of 70.53%: 73.08% for males and 68.02% for females, and a sex ratio of 98.40 males for every 100 females. 29,470 (22.43%) lived in urban areas.

According to the 2011 Census of Bangladesh, Ghoraghat Upazila had 30,077 households and a population of 117,740. 25,404 (21.58%) were under 10 years of age. Ghoraghat had a literacy rate (age 7 and over) of 45.98%, compared to the national average of 51.8%, and a sex ratio of 996 females per 1000 males. 23,554 (20.01%) lived in urban areas. Ethnic population was 7,801 (6.63%), of which Santal were 4,929.

As of the 1991 Bangladesh census, Ghoraghat had a population of 84279. Males constituted 51.01% of the population, and females 48.99%. This Upazila's eighteen up population is 43913. Ghoraghat has an average literacy rate of 26.1% (7+ years), and the national average of 32.4% literate.

According to the 2022 census, total population was 131,413. Ethnic population was 5,342 (4,06%) in which Santal people was 3,287.

Population of upazila by ethnicity (2022)
1. Bengali (95.9%)
2. Santal (2.50%)
3. Others (1.56%)

== Economy ==
Agriculture 68.64%, non-agricultural labourer 2.84%, industry 0.50%, commerce 12.95%, transport and communication 2.91%, service 4.35%, construction 0.53%, religious service 0.13%, rent and remittance 0.07% and others 7.08%.

== Points of interest ==
- The shrine of Shah Ismail Ghazi is at Ghoraghat. He was a saint-warrior of the time of Ruknuddin Barbak Shah (1459-1474 AD). Shah Ismail Ghazi was first appointed to deal with the aggressive designs of the Orissan king of Gajapati Kingdom in the southern frontier of Bengal. He defeated the king of Gajapati Kingdom and wrested from him Mandaran, the frontier outpost. The successful general was then sent against Kamrup king Kameshwar, who was defeated and forced to pay tribute to the sultan. But soon, Bhandsi Rai, a commander of the frontier post of Ghoraghat, got jealous over the popularity and fame of Shah Ismail and sent a false report to the sultan that Ismail Ghazi, in collusion with the Kamrup king, was mediating to set up an independent kingdom for himself. The enraged sultan ordered the saint to be beheaded.
- Sura Mosque:
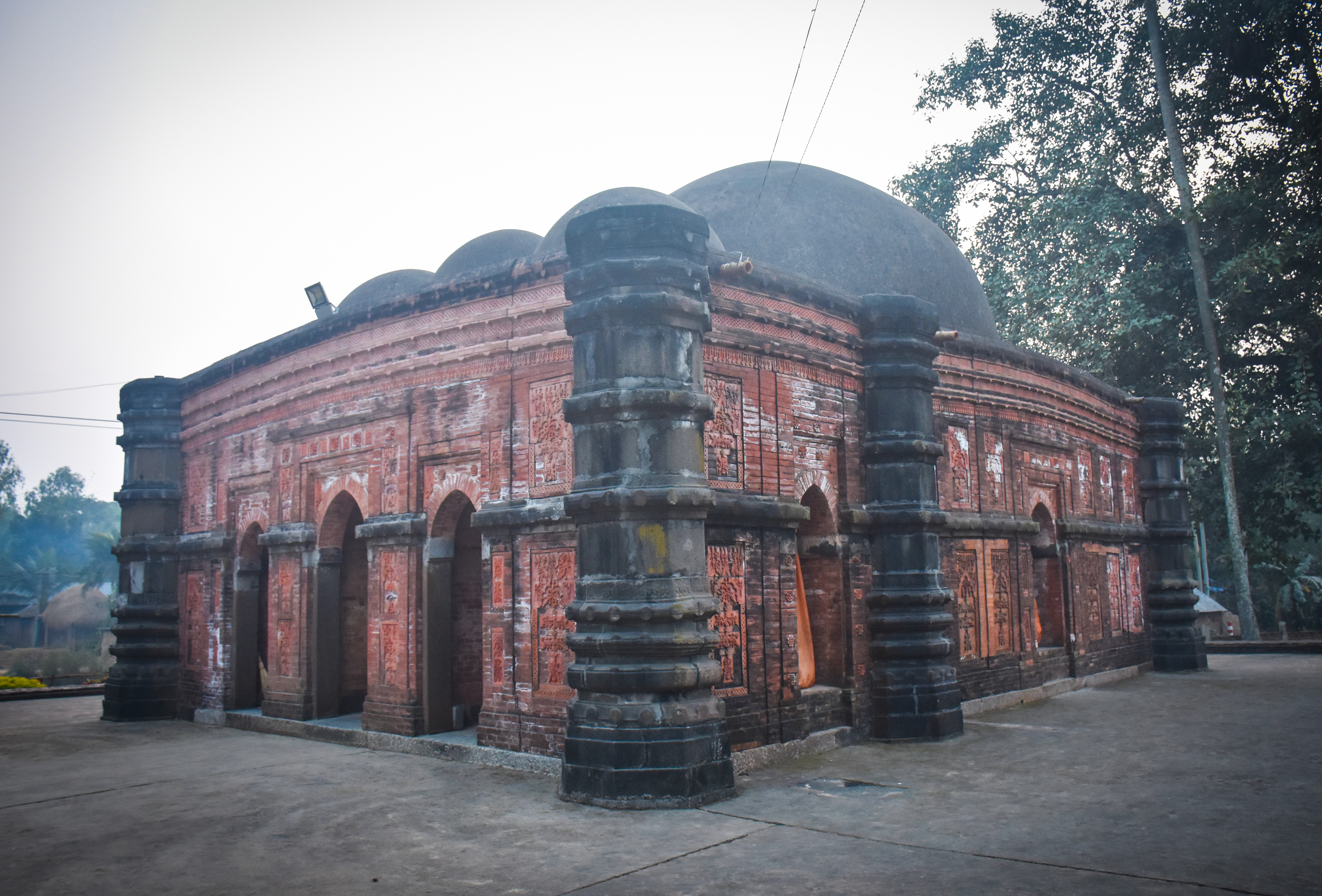
  Sura Masjid, Ghoraghat, Dinajpur
  The Sura Mosque is situated in Ghoraghat-Panchbibi road. There is no inscription tablet at the mosque, but it has been dated to the early sixteenth century in the light of its close links with dated monuments of similar style. An inscription from the time of Alauddin Hussain Shah, dated at 910 A. H./1504 A. D. was discovered in the village Champatali, a few miles away from the place. It records the construction of a mosque, and if this inscription describes the mosque at Sura, the year 1504 A. D. is the date of its construction.
- Ghoraghat Fort Mosque situated in the southeastern corner of the Ghoraghat Fort, which is located on the right side of the river Karatoya in the southeastern part of the district of Dinajpur. Within the fort area were erected a number of religious and secular buildings, of which only a mosque in ruinous condition and a few scattered mounds have survived. According to an inscription the mosque was built in 1740-41 AD by Zainul Abedin, the Mughal fauzdar of the Sarkar of Ghoraghat.
- The Laldaha Beel is situated Ghoraghat thana Sadar west North side of Kadim nagar and Lal bagg village. Many fairy tales are there about this beel.

== Administration ==
UNO: Md. Rafiqul Islam.

Ghoraghat Upazila is divided into Ghoraghat Municipality and four union parishads: Bulakipur, Ghoraghat, Palsa, and Singra. The union parishads are subdivided into 115 mauzas and 102 villages.

Ghoraghat Municipality is subdivided into 9 wards and 29 mahallas.

Former Member of parliament: Shibli Sadique.

== Education ==
Average literacy 26.1%; male 32.8%, female 19.2%.

Educational institutions: colleges 8, secondary schools 18, primary schools 53, Brac schools 29, kindergartens 2, madrasas 34.

Noted educational institutions: Ghoraghat Govt. College (1984), Ghoraghat Women Degree College (1994), Raniganj Mahila College (1994), Dugdugirhat Technical College (2003), Raniganj Bilateral High School (1945), Chatsal Secondary School (1946), Balahar Secondary School (1958), Balagari' Secondary School (1966), Gopalpur Secondary School (1972), Krishnarampur Fazil Madrasa (1946), Deogaon Rahmania Senior Madrasa (1947), Nurjahanpur R.M.C.High School (1996), K.C. Pilot High school and College, R.C. Pilot Girlhigh School, Ghoraghat Dakhil Madrasa, Shah Ismail Ghazi Girlhigh School, Ghoraghat Govt. Primary School, Dakshin Joydebpur Govt. Primary school."

== Notable people ==
- Heyat Mahmud (1693–1760), medieval poet

== See also ==
- Upazilas of Bangladesh
- Districts of Bangladesh
- Divisions of Bangladesh
