= Logang Union =

Union of Khagrachhari District, Chittagong, Bangladesh

Logang লোগাং
- Union
- Interactive map of Logang
- Country: Bangladesh
- Division: Chittagong Division
- District: Khagrachhari District
- Upazila: Panchhari Upazila

Area
  - Total: 80.29 km^{2} (31.00 sq mi)

Population (2022)
  - Total: 12,419
  - Density: 154.7/km^{2} (400.6/sq mi)
- Time zone: UTC+6 (BST)
- Postal code: 4410
- Website: logangup.khagrachhari.gov.bd

Logang Union is a union of Panchhari Upazila under Khagrachhari District.

== Demography ==
According to 2022 census, total population of the Union are 12,419. Among them, 2,472 are Muslim, 6,866 are Buddhist, 3,068 are Hindu, 13 are Christian and are follower of others religion.

Religion-2022
1. Buddhism (55.3%)
2. Hinduism (24.7%)
3. Islam (19.9%)
4. Christianity (0.10%)
5. Others (0.00%)

== Ethnicity ==
This Union is home to a variety of different ethnic groups. Among them, 2,572 are Bengali, 6,759 are Chakma, 2,901 are Tripura, 114 are Marma and 73 are of others ethnic groups.

Ethnicity-2022
1. Chakma (54.4%)
2. Tripura (23.4%)
3. Bengali (20.7%)
4. Marma (0.92%)
5. Others (0.59%)
