= Sura Mosque =

Mosque in Dinajpur District, Bangladesh

- সুরা মসজিদ
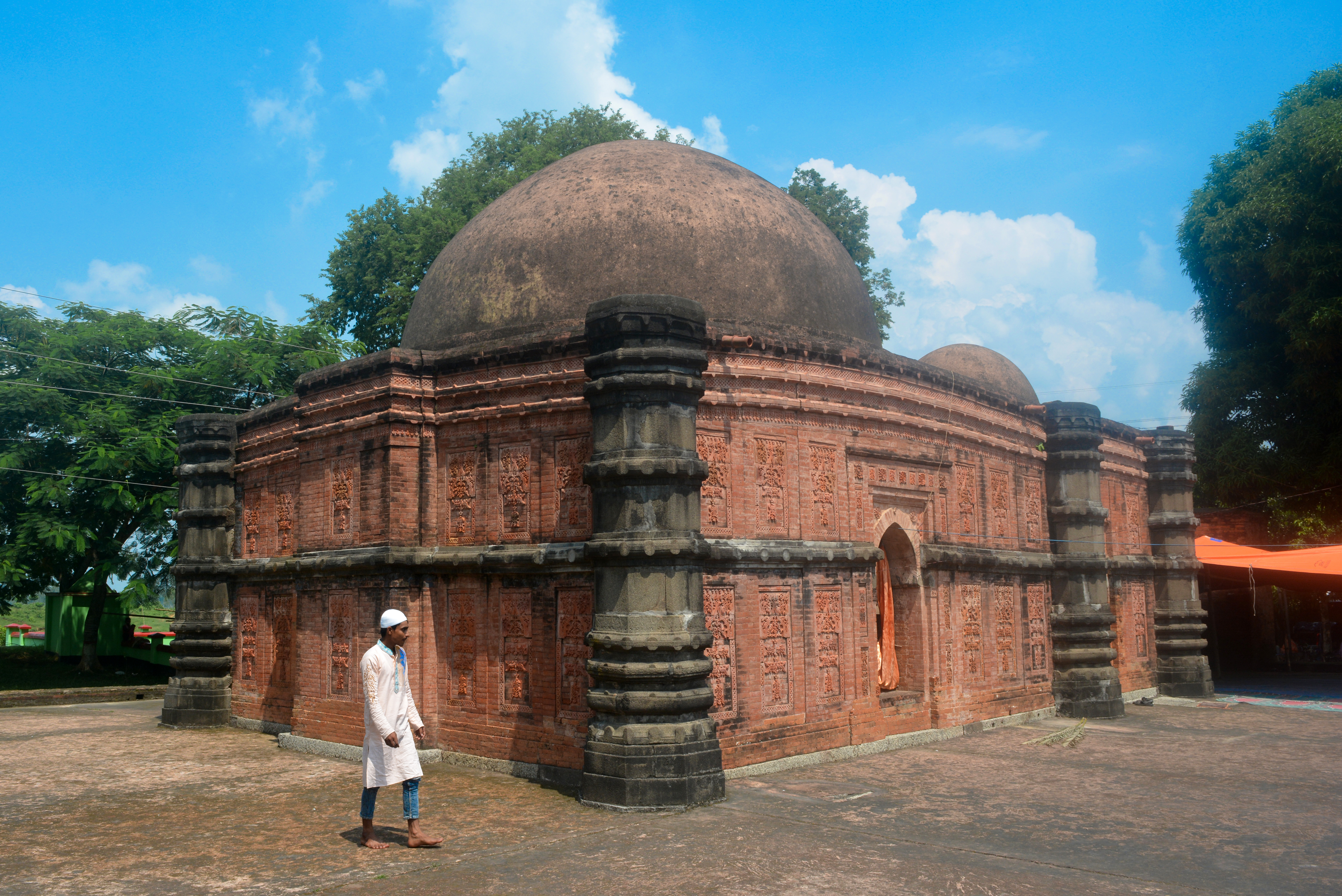

- Location of the mosque in Bangladesh

Religion
- Affiliation: Islam
- Ecclesiastical or organisational status: Mosque
- Status: Active

Location
- Location: Ghoraghat, Dinajpur Rangpur
- Country: Bangladesh
- Coordinates: 25°15′07″N 89°12′44″E

Architecture
- Type: Mosque architecture
- Style: Mughal; Bengal Sultanate
- Completed: 910 AH (1504/1505 CE)
- Dome: Four (one large)

The Sura Mosque (Bengali: সুরা মসজিদ) is a historical mosque in Ghoraghat Upazila of Dinajpur District in the division of Rangpur, Bangladesh. It is a fine example of the Mughal architecture. It is believed that it was constructed during the Bengal Sultanate era of the Hussain Shahi dynasty in the 16th century, based on its architectural design and level of craftsmanship.

== Location and history ==
The Sura Mosque is situated in Ghoraghat Upazila in Dinajpur District, approximately 6 kilometres (3.7 mi) from Upazila headquarters. There is no inscription tablet at the mosque, but it has been dated to the early 16th century in the light of its close links with dated monuments of similar style. An inscription from the time of Alauddin Hussain Shah, dated at 910 AH (1504/1505 CE) was discovered in the village Champatali, a few miles away from the place. It records the construction of a mosque, and if this inscription describes the mosque at Sura, the year 1504 CE is the date of its construction.

== Description ==
The mosque stands on a raised mound of earth and is approached from the east by a flight of steps. It has a single dome over one large square room, and a verandah that has three domes. It has a 4.87-metre (16.0 ft) square prayer chamber, flanked on the east by a 1.82-metre-wide (6.0 ft) foreroom that measures 8.53 by 12.5 metres (28.0 by 41.0 ft) externally. At one time it was surrounded by high walls, which is a style otherwise unknown in Bengal.

The kiblah wall contains three semicircular mihrab niches with cusped arches, each set within an ornamented rectangular frame. The central mihrab is the largest of the three, and is of stone. The brick walls are faced with stone slab from within and the outside surfaces have some evidence of rich carving work of terracotta.

== Gallery ==
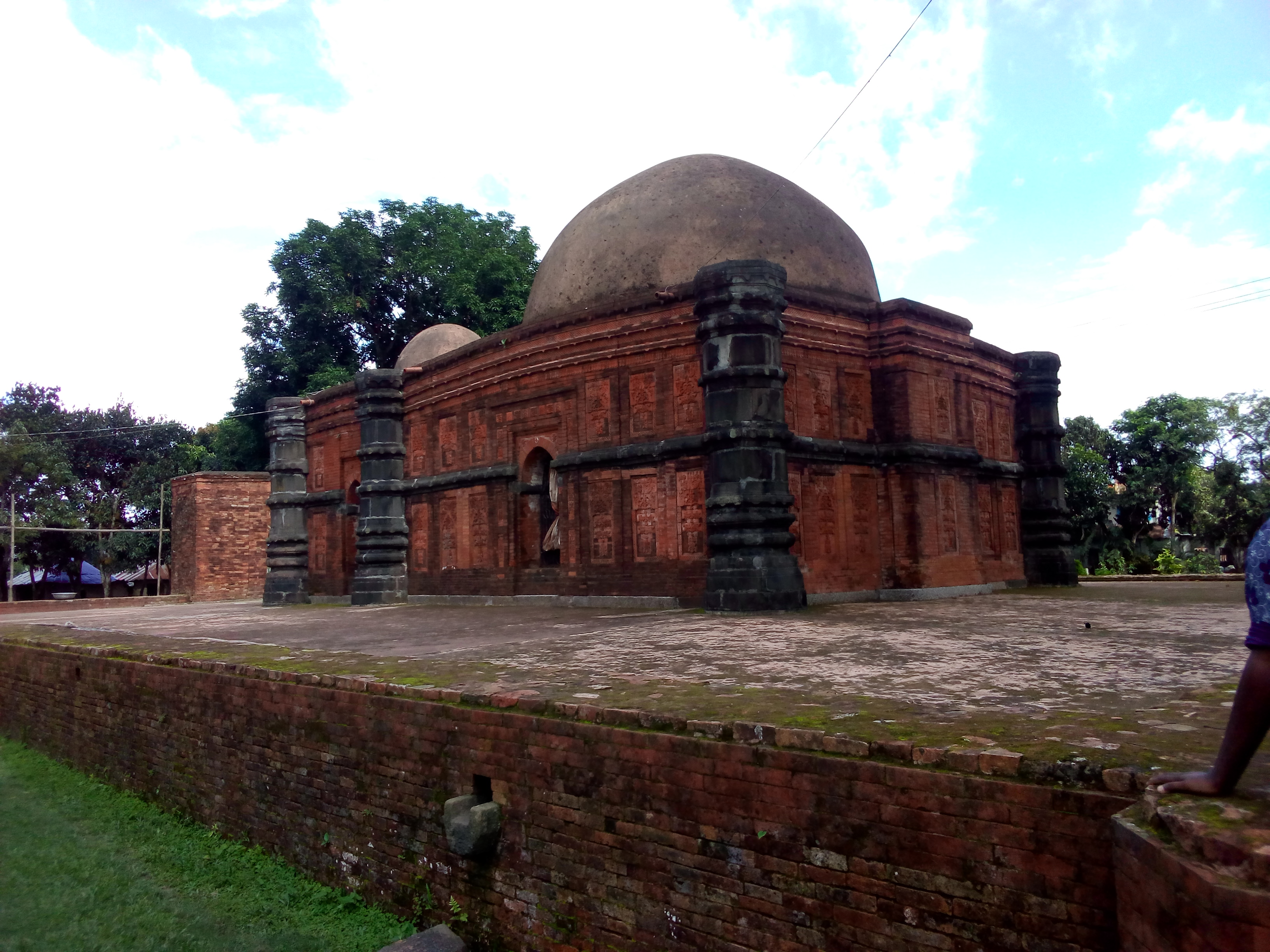
The archeological mosque complex

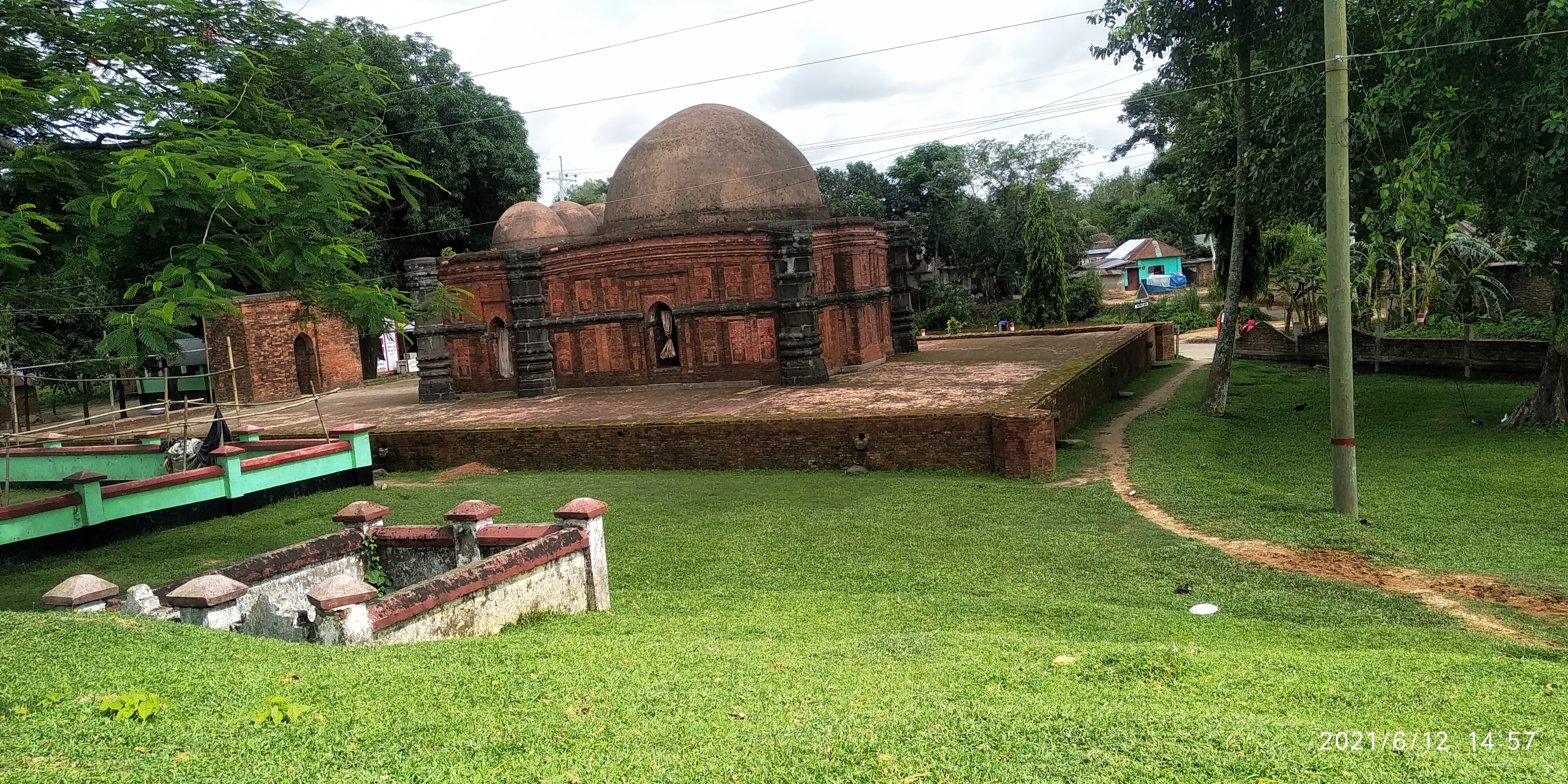
Full view of the mosque complex

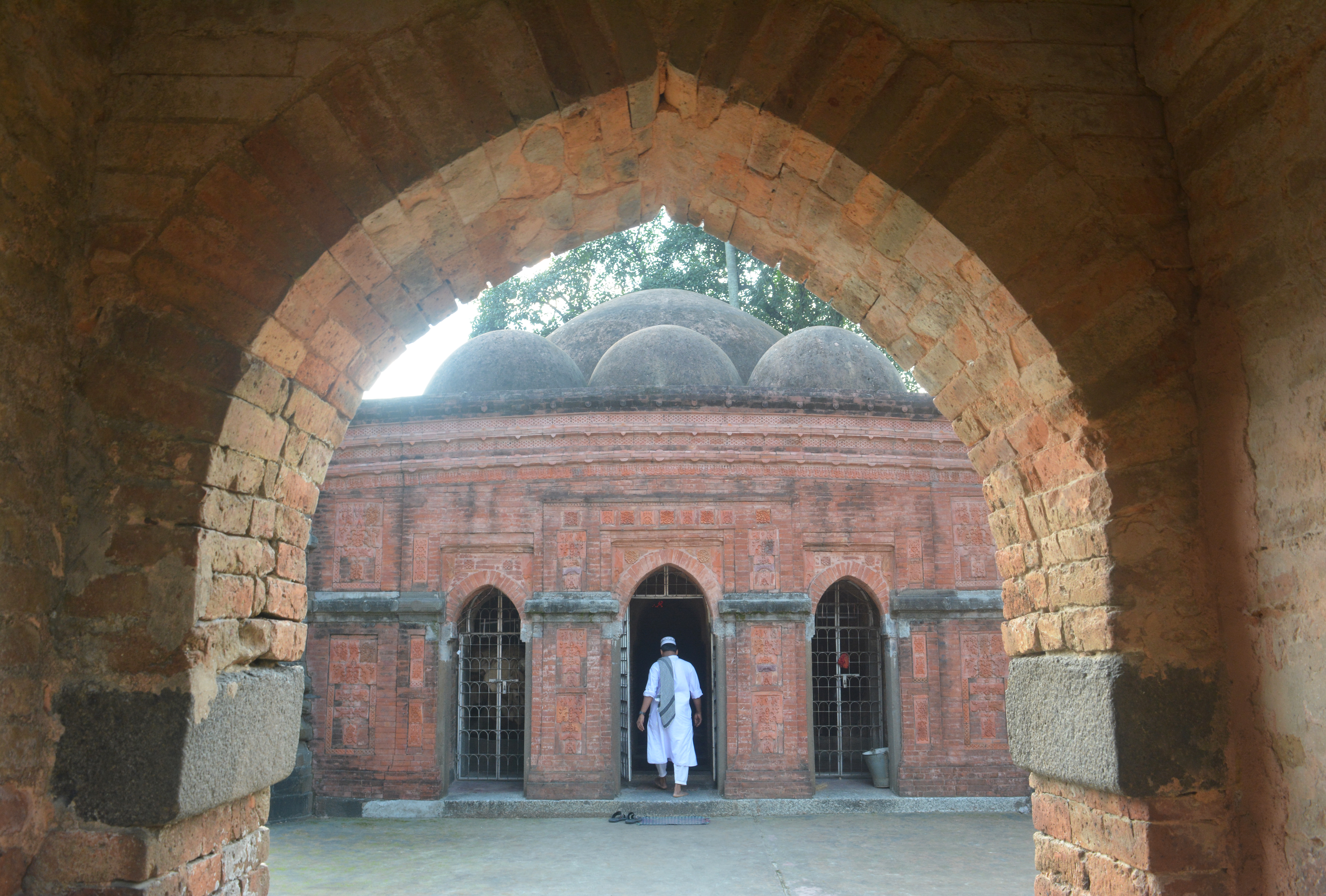
Gate arch

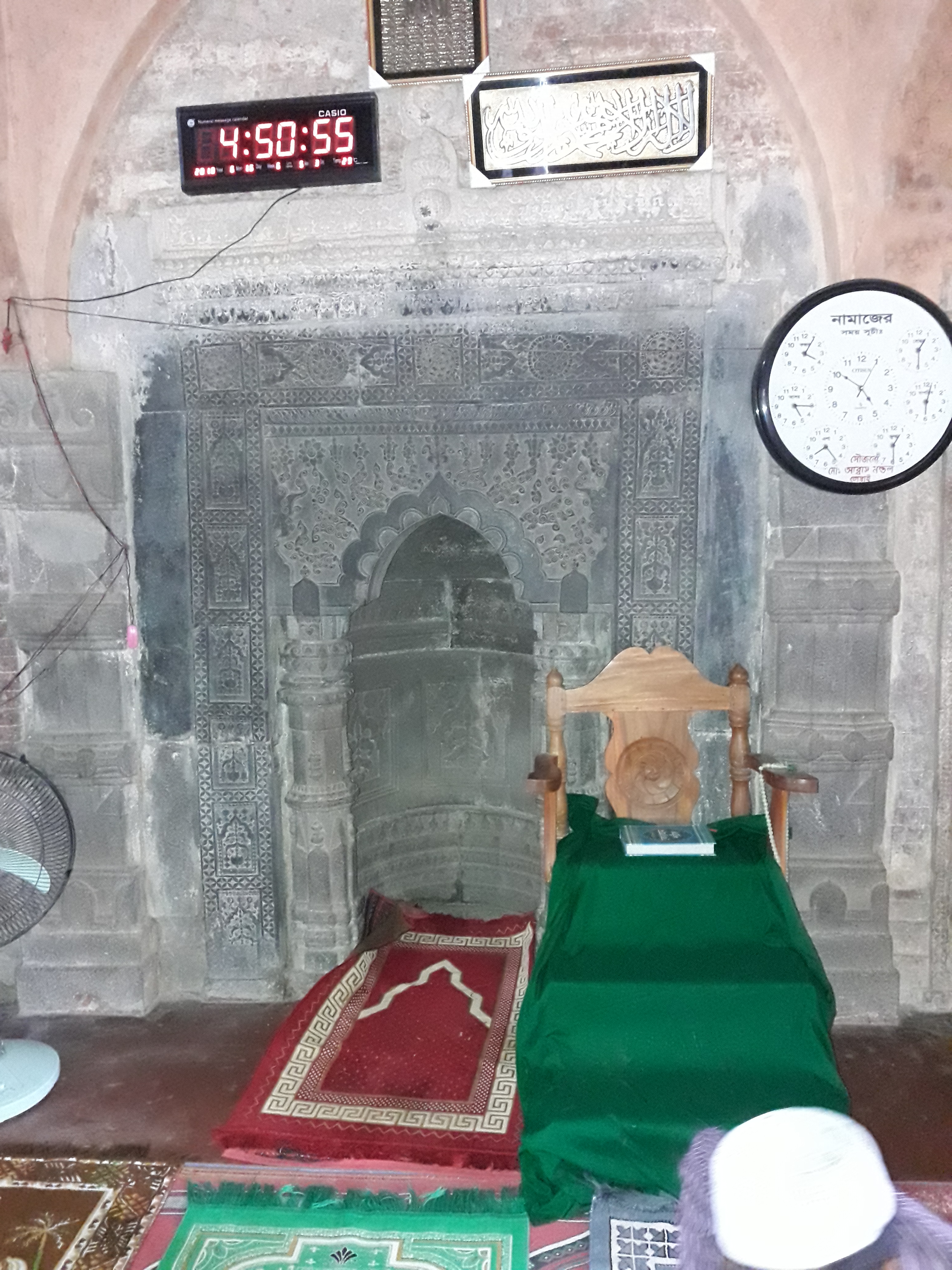
Mihrab of the mosque

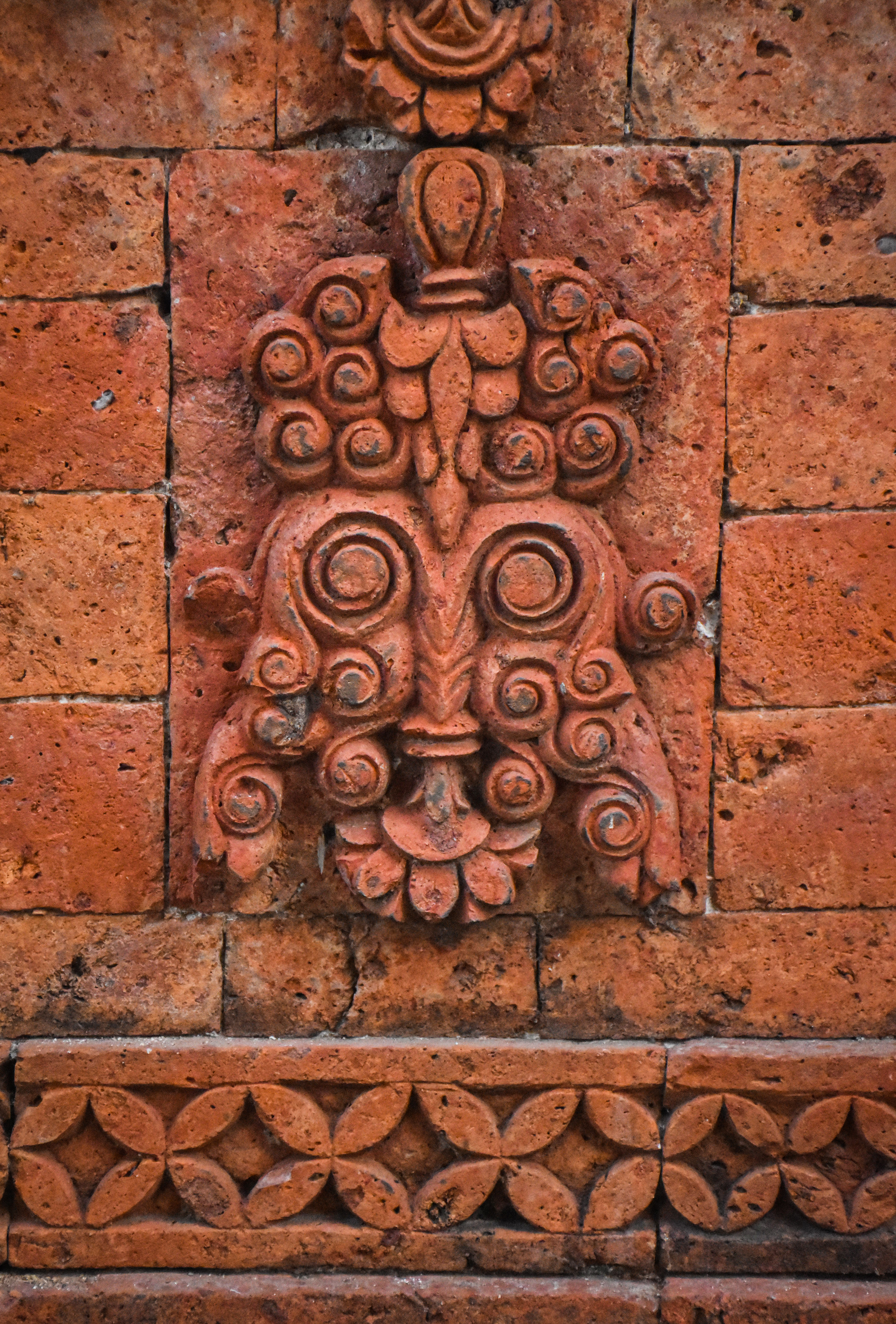
Terracotta on the wall

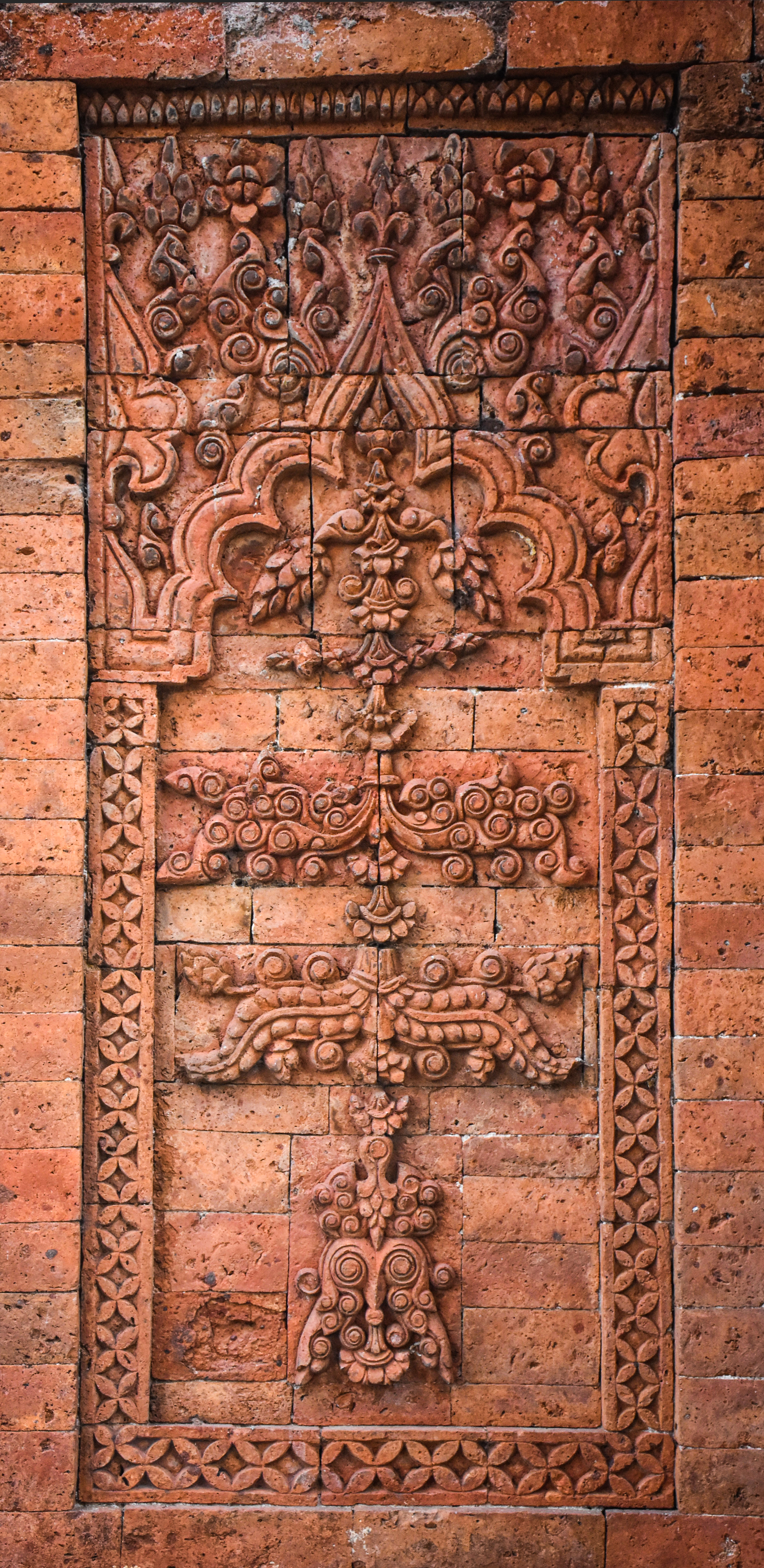
Terracotta art

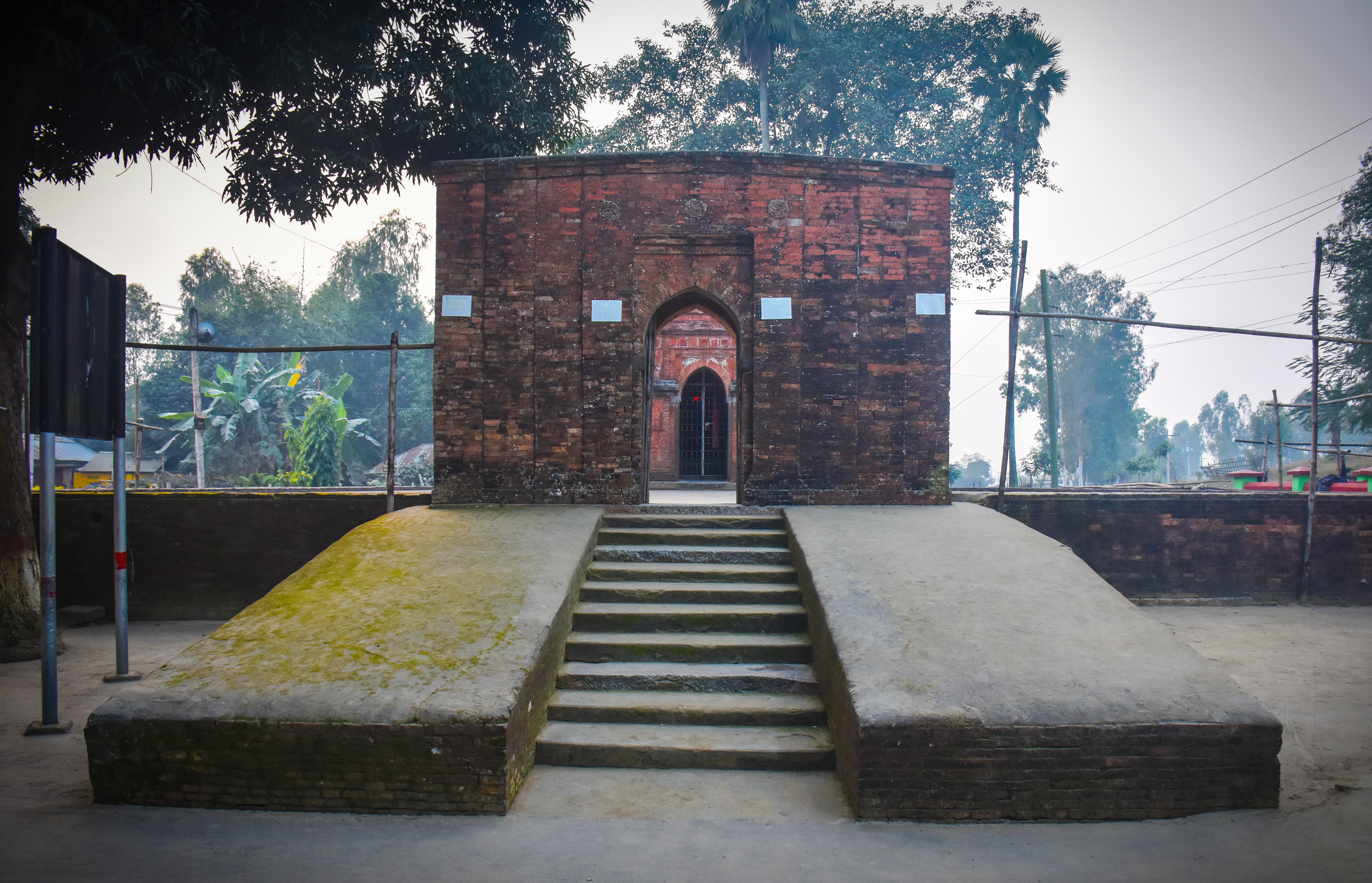
Main entrance

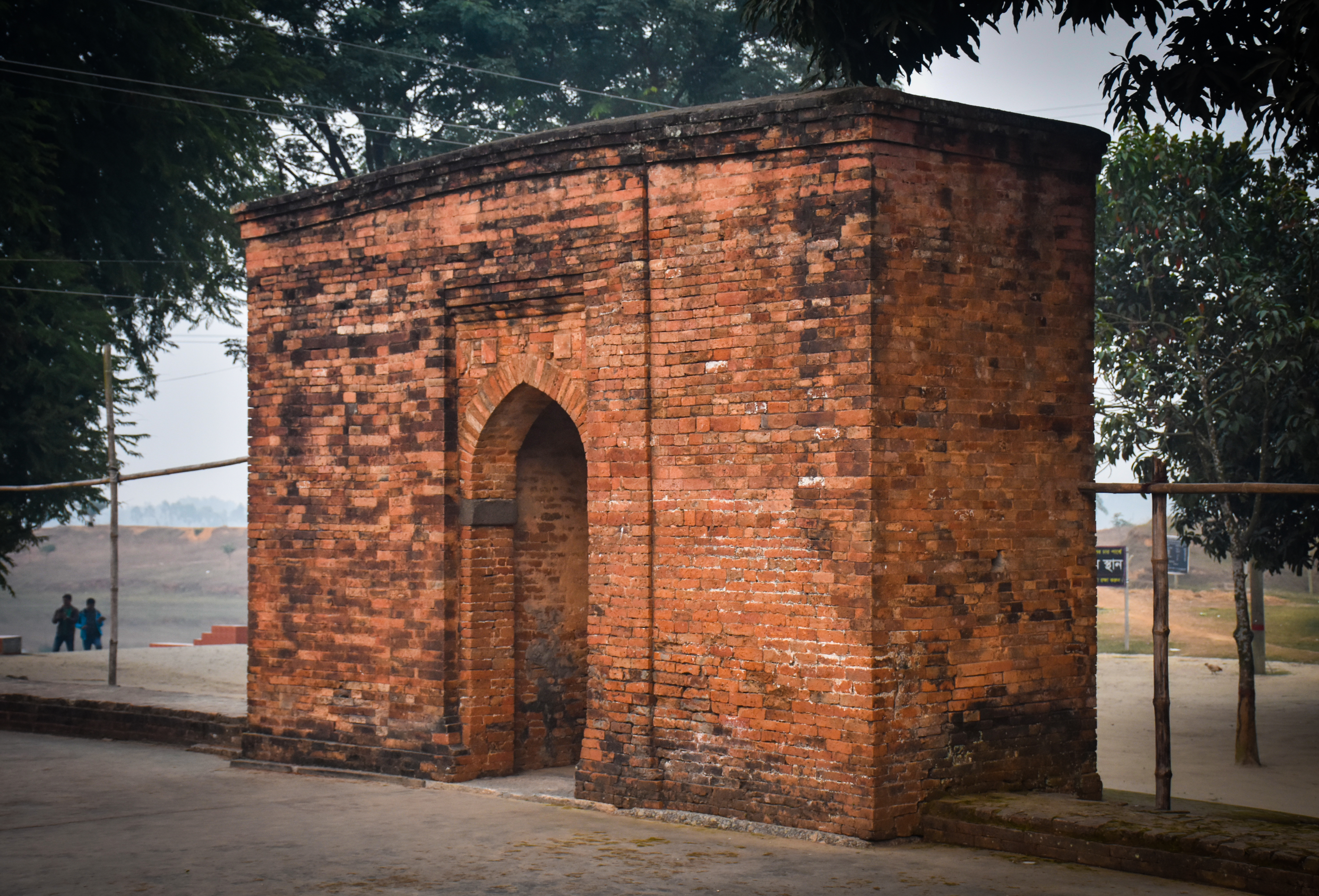
Side view of main entrance

== See also ==
- Islam in Bangladesh
- List of mosques in Bangladesh
