= Ultachhari Union =

Union of Khagrachhari District, Chittagong, Bangladesh

Ultachhari উল্টাছড়ি
- Union
- Interactive map of Ultachhari
- Country: Bangladesh
- Division: Chittagong Division
- District: Khagrachhari District
- Upazila: Panchhari Upazila

Area
  - Total: 41.44 km^{2} (16.00 sq mi)

Population (2022)
  - Total: 12,457
  - Density: 300.6/km^{2} (778.6/sq mi)
- Time zone: UTC+6 (BST)
- Postal code: 4410
- Website: ultachhariup.khagrachhari.gov.bd

Ultachhari Union is a union of Panchhari Upazila under Khagrachhari District.

== Demography ==
According to 2022 census, total population of the Union are 12,457. Among them, 7,068 are Muslim, 3,248 are Buddhist, 2,109 are Hindu and 32 are Christian.

Religion-2022
1. Islam (56.7%)
2. Buddhism (26.1%)
3. Hinduism (16.9%)
4. Christianity (0.26%)
5. Others (0.00%)

== Ethnicity ==
This Union is home to a variety of different ethnic groups. Among them, 7,105 are Bengali, 2,843 are Chakma, 2,079 are Tripura, 424 are Marma and 6 are of others ethnic groups.

Ethnicity-2022
1. Bengali (57.0%)
2. Chakma (22.8%)
3. Tripura (16.7%)
4. Marma (3.40%)
5. Others (0.05%)
