= Weekly Pratibeshi =

Weekly magazine in Bangladesh

Weekly Pratibeshi; সাপ্তাহিক প্রতিবেশী
- Frequency: Weekly
- Founded: 1941
- Country: Bangladesh
- Language: Bengali
- Website: weekly.pratibeshi.org

Weekly Pratibeshi (Bengali: সাপ্তাহিক প্রতিবেশী, lit. 'Weekly Neighbourhood') is a Christian weekly newspaper in Bangladesh.

== History ==
In 1941, Weekly Pratibeshi was established in Mymensingh.

In 1942, the publication was renamed as Catholic Mission Patrika and in 1944, the printing press was moved to Dhaka from Mymensingh. In 1947 after the partition of India, it took the current name, Pratibeshi, and in 1960, it became a weekly publication.

It supported the Bengali language movement in 1952 and supported the independence of Bangladesh by publishing reports supportive of Bengalis in East Pakistan in 1971, effectively supporting the Bangladeshi independence movement and opposing the Pakistani government.

Weekly Pratibeshi began its digital publication in 2013.

Weekly Pratibeshi is also registered as a weekly newspaper with the Department of Film and Publications, Government of Bangladesh.

== Administration ==
Weekly Pratibeshi is run by the Office of Social Communications of the Bishops' Conference and member of the World Catholic Association for Communication.

=== Headquarters ===
The office of Weekly Pratibeshi is located at Laxmibazar, Dhaka-1100, Bangladesh.
