= Anna Minj =

Bangladeshi politician

- আন্না মিনজ

Member of the Bangladesh Parliament for Reserved women seat
- Incumbent
- Assumed office 2026
- Prime Minister: Tarique Rahman

Personal details
- Born: 31 October 1961 (age 65) Jonail, Baraigram Upazila, Natore District
- Party: Bangladesh Nationalist Party
- Spouse: John Gomes
- Parents: Paulus Minj (father); Serafina Kujur (mother)
- Education: University of Manchester

Anna Minj is a Bangladeshi politician of the Bangladesh Nationalist Party. She is currently serving as a Member of Parliament from reserved women seats. She is the first indigenous woman from northern Bangladesh to reach the national legislature.

== Early life ==
Anna Minj was born on 31 October 1961 to Paulus Minj and the Serafina Kujur in Jonail village of Baraigram Upazila under Natore District. She is a christian from Oraon community. He married John Gomes who is a lawyer by profession and assistant religious affairs secretary of the BNP central committee.

== Education ==
She obtained an MSc in Zoology and a postgraduate diploma in project planning and management from the University of Manchester.

== Career ==
She has worked in organisations like CARITAS, CARE and BRAC, and focuses on issues like advancing gender equality and the rights of indigenous peoples.
