= Sheikh Anar Koli Putul =

Bangladeshi politician

Sheikh Anar Kali Putul
- শেখ আনার কলি পুতুল

Member of the Bangladesh Parliament for Reserved women's seat-30
- In office 28 February 2024 – 6 August 2024
- Prime Minister: Sheikh Hasina

Personal details
- Born: 1 January 1969 (age 57) Dohar Upazila, Dhaka, East Bengal, Pakistan
- Party: Bangladesh Awami League
- Relations: Badar Uddin Ahmed Kamran (brother in law)
- Children: Juboraj Sheikh, 1
- Occupation: Politician, social activist, women leader

Sheikh Anar Kali Putul (born 1 January 1969) is a Awami League politician and a former Jatiya Sangsad member from a women's reserved for Dhaka District. She is the joint secretary of the Bangladesh Mohila Awami League.
