= Afzal H. Khan =

Bangladeshi politician

Member of Parliament
- In office 2001–2006
- Succeeded by: Promode Mankin

Personal details
- Party: Bangladesh Nationalist Party

Afzal H. Khan is a Bangladesh Nationalist Party politician and the former Member of Parliament from Mymensingh-1.

== Career ==
Khan served as the news editor of The Daily Star. He was elected to Parliament from Mymensingh-1 in 2001 as a candidate of Bangladesh Nationalist Party. He is the convenor of the Mymensingh District of Bangladesh Nationalist Party. He competed in the 2008 Bangladesh General election as the candidate of Bangladesh Nationalist Party against the Bangladesh Awami League candidate, Promode Mankin.
