= Md. Delwar Hossain =

Bangladeshi politician

Member of Parliament
- In office 1973–1979
- Succeeded by: Almas Hossain

Personal details
- Party: Bangladesh Awami League

Md. Delwar Hossain is a Bangladesh Awami League politician and a former member of parliament for Mymensingh-1.

== Career ==
Hossain was elected to parliament from Mymensingh-1 as a Bangladesh Awami League candidate in 1973.
