= Panchhari Union =

Union of Khagrachhari District, Chittagong, Bangladesh

Panchhari পানছড়ি
- Union
- Interactive map of Panchhari
- Country: Bangladesh
- Division: Chittagong Division
- District: Khagrachhari District
- Upazila: Panchhari Upazila

Area
  - Total: 82.88 km^{2} (32.00 sq mi)

Population (2022)
  - Total: 24,618
  - Density: 297.0/km^{2} (769.3/sq mi)
- Time zone: UTC+6 (BST)
- Postal code: 4410
- Website: panchariup.khagrachhari.gov.bd

Panchhari Union is a union of Panchhari Upazila under Khagrachhari District.

== Demography ==
According to 2022 census, total population of the Union are 24,618. Among them, 11,378 are Muslim, 9,938 are Buddhist, 3,260 are Hindu, 39 are Christian and 3 are follower of others religion.

Religion-2022
1. Islam (46.2%)
2. Buddhism (40.4%)
3. Hinduism (13.2%)
4. Christianity (0.16%)
5. Others (0.01%)

== Ethnicity ==
This Union is home to a variety of different ethnic groups. Among them, 12,742 are Bengali, 9,298 are Chakma, 1,926 are Tripura, 449 are Marma and 203 are of others ethnic groups.

Ethnicity-2022
1. Bengali (51.8%)
2. Chakma (37.8%)
3. Tripura (7.82%)
4. Marma (1.82%)
5. Others (0.83%)
