= Md. Emdadul Haque =

Bangladeshi politician

Member of Bangladesh Parliament

Personal details
- Party: Jatiya Party (Ershad)

Md. Emdadul Haque is a Jatiya Party (Ershad) politician and a former member of parliament for Mymensingh-1.

== Career ==
Haque was elected to parliament from Mymensingh-1 as a Jatiya Party candidate in 1986 and 1988.
