= Promode Mankin =

Bangladeshi politician (1939–2016)

Promode Mankin Sangma
- প্রমোদ মানকিন
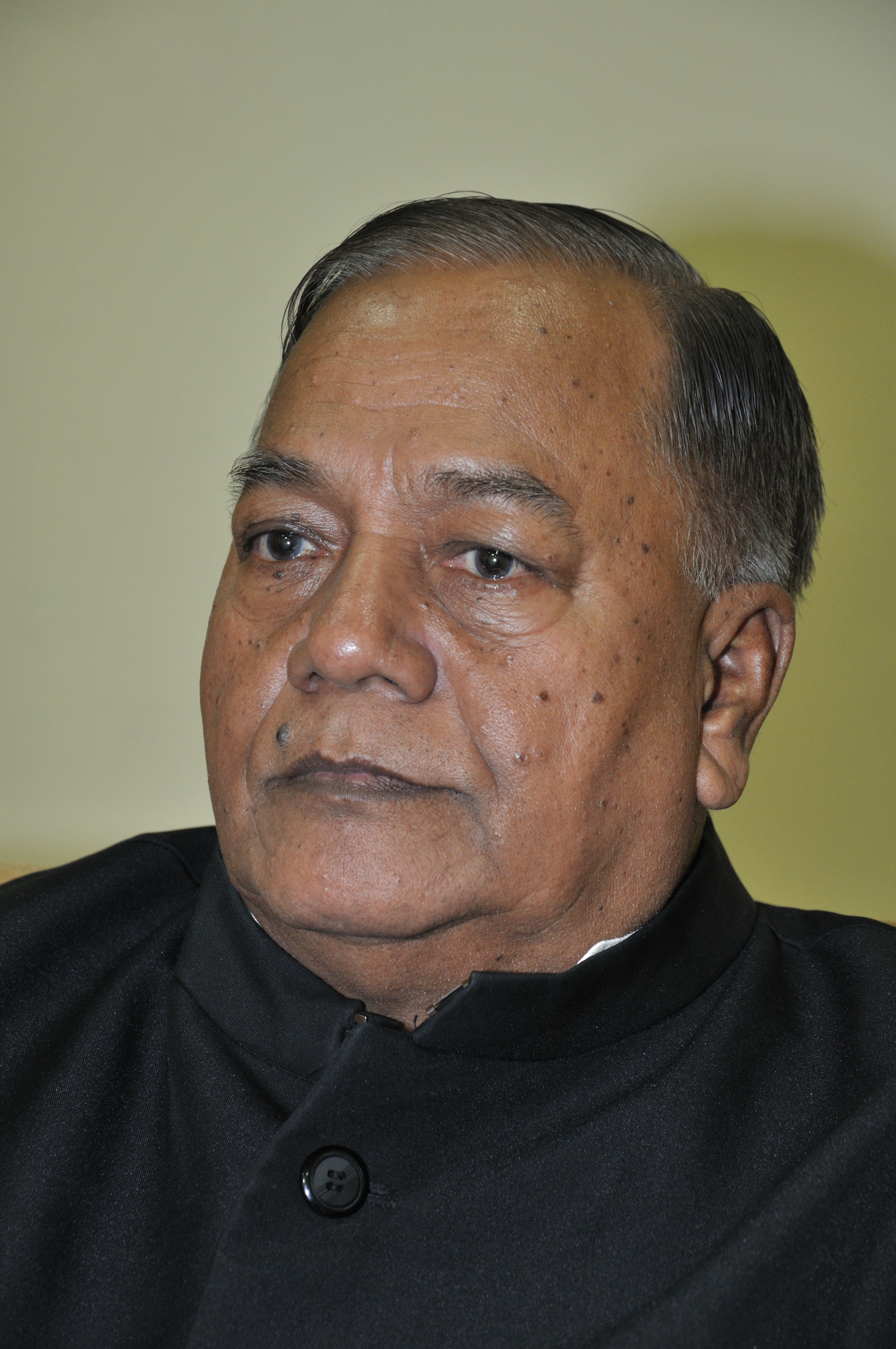
- Mankin in Kolkata in 2011

State Minister of Social Welfare Affairs
- In office 31 July 2009 – 11 May 2016
- Prime Minister: Sheikh Hasina
- Preceded by: Selima Rahman
- Succeeded by: K. M. Khalid

Member of Parliament
- In office 1 October 2001 – 11 May 2016
- Preceded by: Afzal H. Khan
- Succeeded by: Jewel Areng
- Constituency: Mymensingh-1

Personal details
- Born: 18 April 1939 Netrokona, Bengal Presidency, British India
- Died: 11 May 2016 (aged 76) Mumbai, India
- Party: Bangladesh Awami League
- Spouse: Momota Areng
- Children: 6
- Relatives: Jewel Areng (son)

Promode Mankin (18 April 1939 – 11 May 2016) was a Bangladesh Awami League politician and state minister of social welfare affairs. He was the first Catholic and first member of the country's Christian community to become a government minister in Bangladesh. Later, his son, Jewel Areng, was elected MP after his father's death in his constituency.

== Early life and career ==
Mankin was born on 18 April 1939 at Ramnagar village in Bakalijora Union, Durgapur Upazila, Netrokona to Megha Tozu and Hridoy Cecelia Mankin. He joined the Awami League in 1991. He was the president of the Bangladesh Christian Association. He was elected member of parliament from Mymensingh-1 four times. He was a member of the Garo community. He fought in the Bangladesh liberation war.

== Personal life and death ==
On 29 January 1964, Mankin married Momota Arengh. They had five daughters and one son. He died on 11 May 2016 at Holy Family Hospital in Mumbai, India.
