= Jewel Areng =

Bangladeshi politician

Jewel Arengh
- জুয়েল আরেং
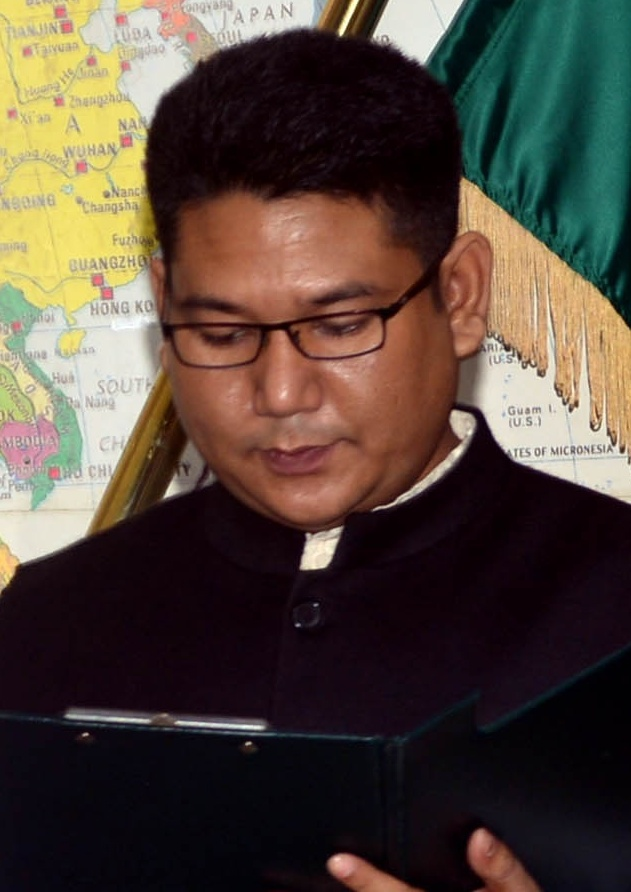
- Arengh in 2016

Member of Parliament
- In office 18 July 2016 – 10 January 2024
- Preceded by: Promode Mankin
- Succeeded by: Mahmudul Haque Sayem
- Constituency: Mymensingh-1

Personal details
- Born: 1 January 1983 (age 43) Dhobaura, Bangladesh
- Party: Bangladesh Awami League
- Spouse: Mirium Merila Chicham
- Children: 3
- Parent: Promode Mankin (father)
- Committees: Standing Committee on Ministry of Youth and Sports

Jewel N. Arengh is a Bangladeshi Garo Awami League politician and a former member of parliament from Mymensingh-1. He was the youngest member of parliament and the only Catholic. His father, Promode Mankin, was the state minister for social welfare in the Bangladesh Awami League government.

== Career ==
On 18 July 2016 Arengh was elected to parliament from Mymensingh-1 in a special election. The special election was held after the seat became vacant because of the death of Promode Mankin, the member of parliament and father of Jewel Arengh. Areng beat his opponent, Selina Khatun, by 155,866 votes.
