= Haluaghat Upazila =

Sub-district in Mymensingh, Bangladesh

Haluaghat হালুয়াঘাট
- Upazila
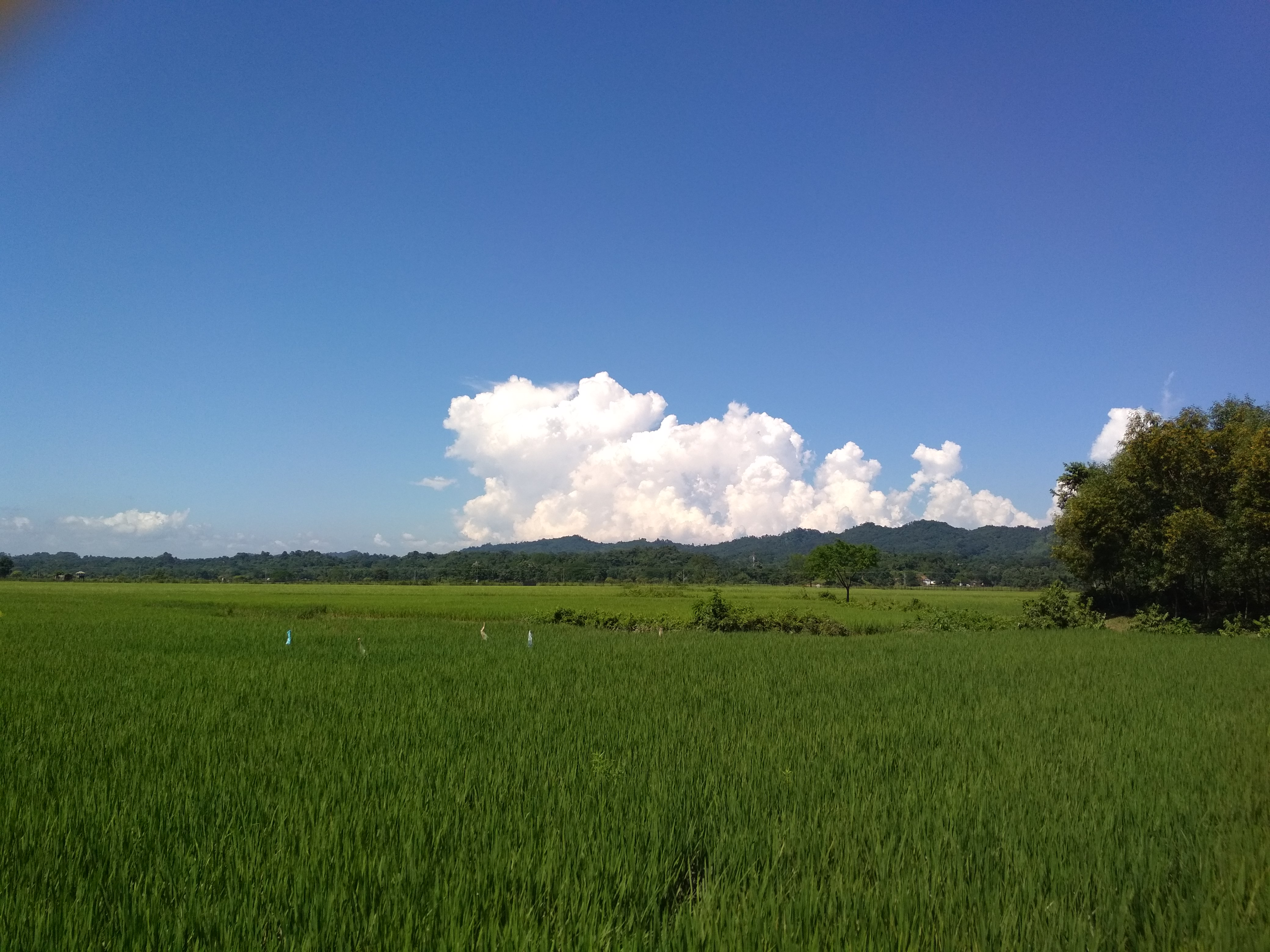
- Fields in Beltali village with Garo Hills in background

- Coordinates: 25°7.5′N 90°21′E
- Country: Bangladesh
- Division: Mymensingh Division
- District: Mymensingh District

Area
  - Total: 357.61 km^{2} (138.07 sq mi)

Population (2022)
  - Total: 316,539
  - Density: 885.15/km^{2} (2,292.5/sq mi)
- Time zone: UTC+6 (BST)
- Postal code: 2260
- Website: haluaghat.mymensingh.gov.bd

Haluaghat Upazila mauza geocode map

Haluaghat (Bengali: হালুয়াঘাট) is an upazila of Mymensingh District in Mymensingh, Bangladesh.

== Geography ==
Haluaghat is located at 25.1250°N 90.3500°E. It has 69,725 households and a total area of 357.61 km^{2}.

The upazila is bounded by the Meghalaya state of India on the north, Phulpur and Tarakanda upazilas on the south, Dhobaura on the east, and Nalitabari on the west. Major rivers flowing through this region include the Kangsha and Darsha.

There is a strategic border checkpoint on the Bangladesh–India border at Haluaghat (Gobrakura and Karaitoli land ports), which facilitates international trade between the two countries.

== Demographics ==
Historical population
Year	Pop.	±%
1981	167,070	—
1991	242,339	+45.1%
2001	269,372	+11.2%
2011	290,043	+7.7%
2022	316,539	+9.1%
Source: Bangladesh Bureau of Statistics

Religions in Haluaghat Upazila (2022)
Religion	Percent
Islam	92.32%
Christianity	3.84%
Hinduism	3.82%
Other or not stated	0.02%

According to the 2022 Bangladeshi census, Haluaghat Upazila had 81,123 households and a population of 316,539. 10.28% of the population were under 5 years of age. Haluaghat had a literacy rate (age 7 and over) of 67.00%: 68.62% for males and 65.47% for females, and a sex ratio of 95.29 males for 100 females. 48,399 (15.29%) lived in urban areas. The ethnic population is 8,980 (2.84%), nearly all Garo and a small number are Hajong.

Population of Haluaghat upazila by ethnicity (2022)
1. Bengali (97.2%)
2. Garo (2.76%)
3. Others (0.08%)

== Administration ==
Haluaghat Thana was formed in 1916 and it was turned into an upazila in 1983.

The upazila is divided into 12 union parishads: Amtoil, Bhubankura, Bildora, Dhara, Dhurail, Gazirbhita, Haluaghat, Jugli, Kaichapur, Narail, Sakuai, and Swadeshi. The union parishads are subdivided into 146 mauzas and 214 villages.

== See also ==
- Upazilas of Bangladesh
- Districts of Bangladesh
- Divisions of Bangladesh
- Administrative geography of Bangladesh
