= Gorfotu =

Bangladeshi village

- Location in Bangladesh
- Coordinates: 25°59′N 88°33′E
- Country: Bangladesh
- Division: Rangpur Division
- District: Dinajpur District
- Time zone: UTC+6 (Bangladesh Time)

Gorfotu is a village located about 45 km north of Dinajpur city in the northern part of Bangladesh. The last northern head of this village is the beginning of Panchagarh District. The Atrai River flows on the eastern side. Across the river is the Nilphamari District. Thakurgaon District is located about 20 km to the west.

== Geography ==
The village is located in Shatgram Union No. 3 of Birganj Upazila of Dinajpur District.

The Atrai River flows through the eastern side of Gorfotu Village.

== Economics ==
The village is mainly agricultural.

== Education ==
The village has a government primary school named Gorfotu Government Primary School.

== Religion ==
Most of the people of Gorfotu village are Muslims. There is a Mosque called Gorfotu Baitul Noor Jame Masjid in the village for Muslims to worship.
