= Zakaria Zaka =

Bangladesh politician

- জাকারিয়া জাকা

Member of the Bangladesh Parliament for Dinajpur-1
- In office 10 January 2024 – 6 August 2024
- Preceded by: Manoranjan Shill Gopal
- Succeeded by: Md. Manjurul Islam

Personal details
- Born: 16 October 1972 (age 53)
- Party: Awami League

Mohammed Zakaria Zaka (born 16 October 1972) is a Bangladeshi politician from the Dinajpur District of Bangladesh and a Jatiya Sangsad member representing the Dinajpur-1 constituency in 2024. He serves as the president of the Birganj Upazila unit of the Awami League.
