= Singra National Park =

National park of Bangladesh

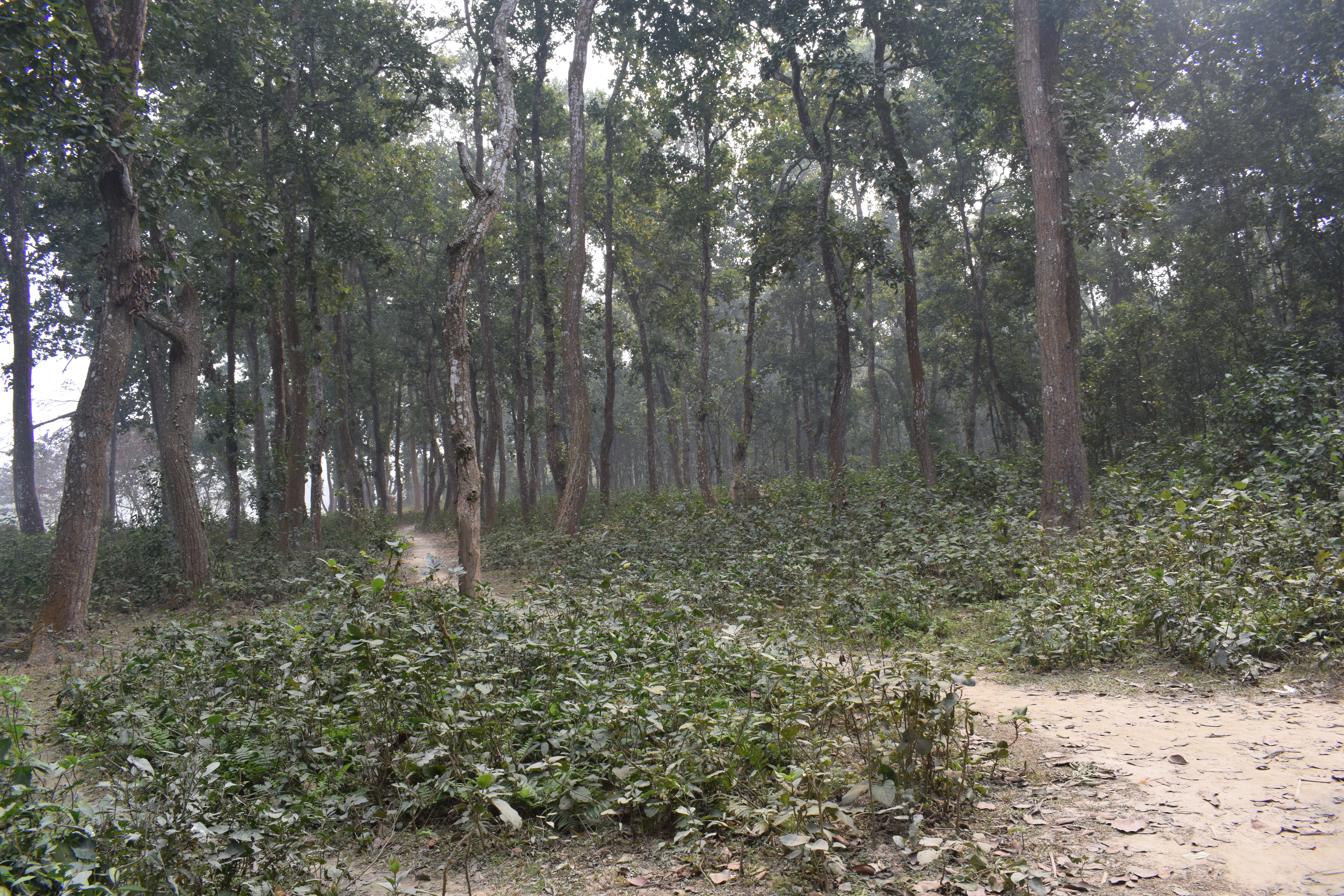

- Location within Bangladesh
- Location: Dinajpur, Rangpur Division, Bangladesh
- Nearest city: Birganj
- Coordinates: 25.8901°N 88.5631°E
- Area: 305.69 ha (755.4 acres)
- Established: 2011

Singra National Park is a protected forest located in the northern region of Bangladesh, within the Dinajpur district. Locally, it is known as Singra Sal Forest. The park is situated in Bhognagar Union, about 40 km north of Dinajpur town by road, and 15 km from Birganj Upazila. The total forest area is 355 hectares, with 305.69 hectares designated as the national park (for conservation). Singra National Park spans across four administrative villages: Dalagram, Chaulia, Singra, and Nortnadi. On 10 October 2010, the Forest Department declared it a national park to promote environmental development, wildlife conservation, and tourism.

The Nort River flows through the middle of Singra National Park. For tourists, a small rest house and two picnic spots are available. During winter, the number of visitors increases significantly. To conserve the biodiversity of Singra Sal Forest, a co-management committee—made up of local representatives and supported by RDRS Bangladesh—is actively working here.

== History ==
The Singra forest was first designated as government land in 1885. After Bangladesh's independence, a government gazette in 1974 brought the forest under the Forest Department. Later, on 10 October 2010, it was declared a national park along with three other forests in northern Bangladesh. The protected area was named Singra National Park after the Singra administrative region. Locally, it is also called Singra Sal Forest.

== Flora and fauna ==
=== Flora ===
Singra National Park is mainly dominated by deciduous sal trees. Besides sal, there are also jarul, tarul, shilkari, Shimul, minjiri, teak, gamar, akashmoni, ghoranim, sonalu, gutijam, haritaki, bayra, amloki, and various other unnamed plants and vines.

=== Mammals ===
Once, this forest was home to tigers, nilgai, and many other wild animals. However, due to deforestation and increasing population pressure, much of the wildlife has disappeared. Currently, animals like rabbit, fox, snake, and mongoose can still be seen, along with various species of birds and insects.

=== Birds ===
Birds such as vultures, local shoomcha, harichacha, bronzed drongo, blue-throated barbet, great tit, barn owl, meg hao kingfisher, Eurasian collared dove, spotted dove, woodpecker, benebou, bulbul, tailorbird, and long-tailed nightjar can now be seen here.
