= Birganj Pilot Government High School =

Government high school in Bangladesh

- বীরগঞ্জ পাইলট সরকারি উচ্চ বিদ্যালয়

Location
- Birganj, Dinajpur-5220; Bangladesh
- Coordinates: 25.8548°N 88.6535°E

Information
- Type: Government high school
- Motto: Knowledge is power
- Established: 1962
- School board: Board of Intermediate and Secondary Education, Dinajpur
- School district: Dinajpur
- Session: January–December
- Headmaster: Bidyut Kumar Kabiraj (2022-present)
- Teaching staff: 15
- Grades: 6th-10th Grades
- Gender: Male only
- Language: Bengali
- Hours in school day: 10 am - 4pm
- Sports: Football, cricket, basketball, volleyball, badminton
- EIIN: 120034
- Website: bpghs.edu.bd

Birganj Pilot Government High School (Bengali: বীরগঞ্জ পাইলট সরকারি উচ্চ বিদ্যালয়) is a public secondary school located in Birganj Upazila of Dinajpur District, Bangladesh.

== History ==
The school was established in 1962 as Birganj Pilot Multipurpose School. It was nationalized in 1985.

== Structure ==
The main campus is established on 5 acres (2.0 ha) land. Another 2.38 acres (0.96 ha) for gardens. The World Heritage Kantajew Temple is only 5 km (3.1 mi) away from this school and the picnic spot Shingra Forest is 6 km (3.7 mi) away.

== Achievements ==
The school won 3rd place in the project presentation of 41st National Science and Technology Week-2019 and 1st place in debate competition. As well, 1st place in project presentation of 40th National Science and Technology Week-2019 and 1st place in debate competition and Science Olympiad.
