= Pirganj Upazila =

Pirganj Upazila may refer to:

- Pirganj Upazila, Rangpur
- Pirganj Upazila, Thakurgaon
