= Anisul Haque Chowdhury =

Anisul Haque Chowdhury may refer to:

- Anisul Haque Chowdhury (Rangpur politician), Bangladeshi politician and member of parliament for Rangpur-7 and Rangpur-2.
- Anisul Haque Chowdhury (Dinajpur politician), Bangladeshi politician and member of parliament for Dinajpur-1
