= Bangladesh Parjatan Corporation =

Statutory board under the Ministry of Civil Aviation & Tourism of Bangladesh

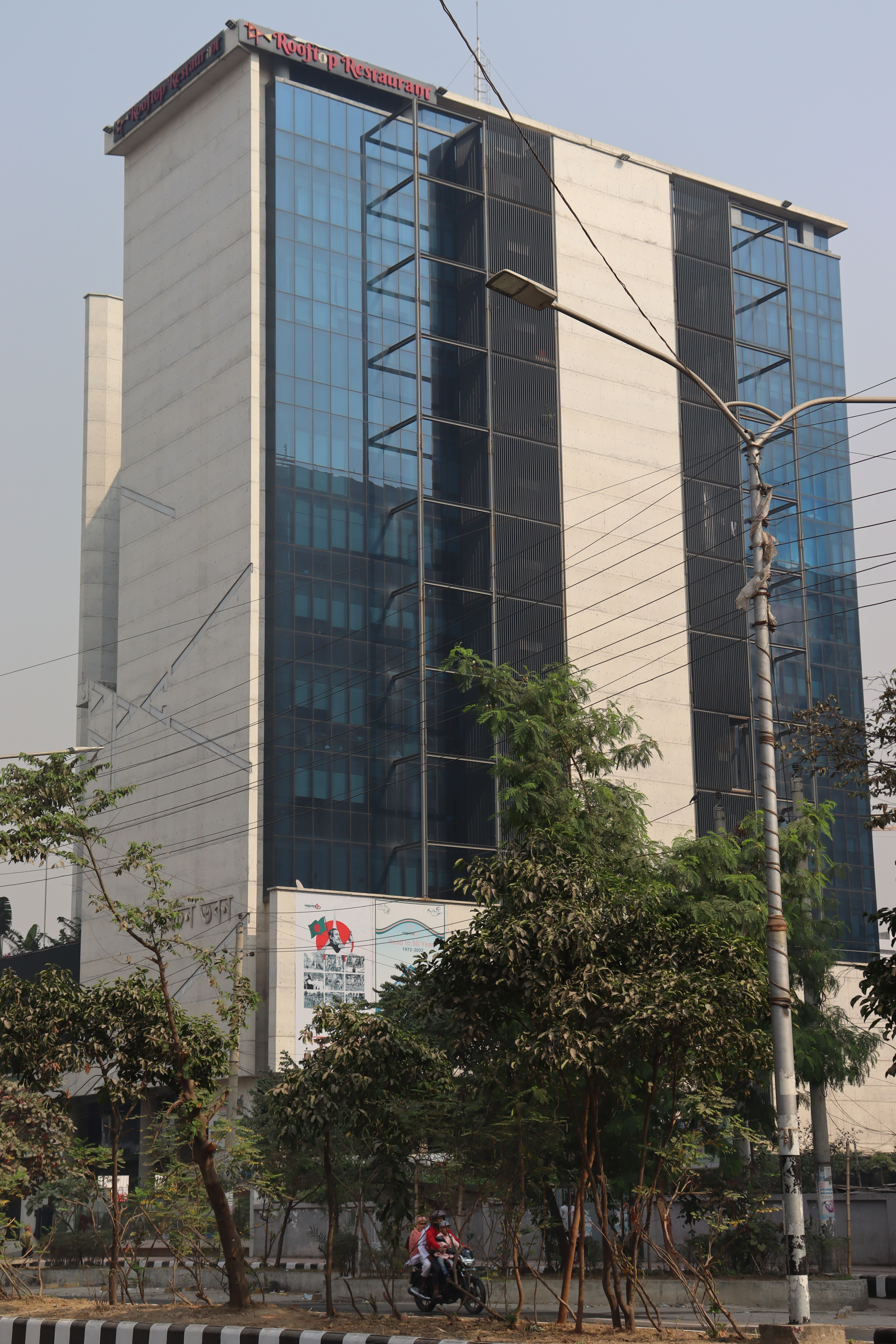
- Formation: 1972
- Headquarters: Dhaka, Bangladesh
- Region served: Bangladesh
- Official language: Bengali
- Chairman: Saema Shahin Sultana
- Website: Bangladesh Parjatan Corporation

Bangladesh Parjatan Corporation (BPC; Bengali: বাংলাদেশ পর্যটন করপোরেশন, lit. 'Bangladesh Tourism Corporation') is a statutory board under the Ministry of Civil Aviation & Tourism of Bangladesh, tasked to promote the tourism industry of the country. It is the national tourism organization of the country.

== Establishment ==
The Board of Bangladesh Parjatan Corporation, was established in the year 1973 consists of a chairman and 3 whole- time Directors. According to the Bangladesh Parjatan Corporation Order 1972, the purpose of the board are

- It shall be the function of the corporation to promote and develop tourism, provide facilities, undertake measures and carry out all forms of activities connected with or ancillary to tourism.
- To promote tourist undertakings and to control and regulate tourist installations and services.
- To organise reception and information facilities in or outside Bangladesh.
- To create tourism awareness among the people.
- To establish institutes for instruction and training of potential tourism personnel.

The National Hotel and Tourism Training Institute was established in 1974 under the Bangladesh Parjatan Corporation to provide professional training to develop skilled manpower for the hotel and tourism industry.

== Functions ==
The corporation performs following functions:

- To promote and develop tourism.
- To establish tourism infrastructures in Bangladesh.
- To provide facilities to undertake measures and carry out all kinds of activities connected with tourism
- To acquire, establish, construct, arrange, provide and run hotels, restaurants, rest houses, picnic spots, camping sites, theatres, amusement parks and facilities for water skiing and entertainment.
- To establish institutes for instruction and training of potential tourism personnel.

== List of chairmen ==
List of Chairmen of Bangladesh Parjatan Corporation
No.	Name	Tenure Start	Tenure End	Reference
1	Nurul Qader Khan	12 March 1973	28 December 1973	
2	Rafiqullah Choudhury	29 December 1973	20 January 1976	
3	Hedayet Ahmed	21 January 1976	19 January 1977	
4	Lt Col Khandakar Mahbubur Rahman	20 January 1977	7 March 1978	
5	Gr Capt ABM Taher Quddus	8 March 1978	8 December 1980	
6	Kazi Manzoor-e-Mowla	9 December 1980	19 May 1981	
7	Sayed Ahmed Reza Hussain	20 May 1981	30 March 1982	
8	Gr Capt M Shawkatul Islam (Retd)	1 May 1982	3 September 1984	
9	Col Sayed Shahabuddin Ahmed	4 September 1984	7 October 1988	
10	Habibur Rahman	6 November 1988	5 February 1991	
11	Shamsul Islam	6 February 1991	15 October 1991	
12	AMM Nasrullah Khan	16 October 1991	5 June 1992	
13	Bazlur Rahman Choudhury	6 June 1992	21 October 1992	
14	MAR Talukder	22 October 1992	5 February 1993	
15	Col Bazlul Ghani Patwari	12 April 1993	5 December 1993	
16	Maj M Abul Bashar Mia	6 December 1993	28 February 1994	
17	Abdus Samad Bhuyan	1 March 1994	22 October 1995	
18	Dr AKA Mubin	23 October 1995	2 March 1997	
19	Khandaker Rashidul Haque	3 March 1997	10 April 1999	
20	Maj M Abul Bashar Mia	11 April 1999	5 September 1999	
21	Abu Saleh	6 September 1999	31 January 2001	
22	M Abdul Latif Mondal	1 February 2001	5 December 2001	
23	Abdur Razzaque	6 December 2001	28 January 2003	
24	Harunur Rashid Bhuya	29 January 2003	11 December 2003	
25	Dr Mohammad Mahbubur Rahman	1 January 2004	8 March 2005	
26	Dr Mahfuzul Haque	20 March 2005	9 November 2006	
27	Mohammad Wajed Ali Khan	12 November 2006	23 March 2007	
28	Mohammad Hafizur Rahman Bhuya	12 February 2007	4 March 2008	
29	Shafique Al Mehdi	5 March 2008	10 May 2009	
30	Mizanur Rahman	10 May 2009	29 June 2009	
31	Mohammad Hamayet Uddin Talukder	1 July 2009	30 June 2012	
32	Mohammad Ehsanul Haque	8 July 2011	12 September 2012	
33	Mohammad Maqsudul Hasan Khan	23 September 2012	9 August 2014	
34	Dr Aparup Chaudhury	18 August 2014	8 May 2017	
35	Aktharuzzaman Khan Kabir	11 May 2017	21 July 2019	
36	Ram Chandra Das	29 July 2019	14 February 2021	
37	Mohammad Hannan Mia	14 February 2021	Incumbent	
