= Abdullah Al Kafi =

Indian politician

- আব্দুল্লাহ আল কাফি

Member of the Bangladesh Parliament for Dinajpur-1
- In office 10 October 2001 – 12 September 2005
- Preceded by: Abdur Rauf Chowdhury
- Succeeded by: Manoranjon Shill Gopal

Personal details
- Born: 28 February 1945 Dinajpur, Bengal Presidency, British India
- Died: 12 September 2005 (aged 60) Dhaka, Bangladesh
- Resting place: Nowpara, Birganj Upazila, Dinajpur
- Party: Jamaat-e-Islami Bangladesh
- Other political affiliations: Four Party Alliance (2001–2005)
- Spouse: Jebun Nesa Al Kafi (m. 1968)
- Children: 6
- Education: University of Rajshahi
- Occupation: Politician

Abdullah Al Kafi (28 February 1945 – 12 September 2005) was a Bangladeshi politician, educator and social worker. He was a member of parliament for Dinajpur-1 constituency from 2001 to 2005 (his death).

== Early life ==
Kafi was born on 28 February 1945, in a small village named Nowpara, in Birganj Thana of Dinajpur, which was under Bengal Presidency of British Raj. His father, Moulavi Moydur Rahman, was a farmer. Kafi had three brothers, and three sisters; including three stepbrothers, and three stepsisters. Kafi was elected as a member of parliament of Jatiyo Sangshad from Dinajpur-1 constituency, in 2001. He studied his bachelor's in economics at University of Rajshahi, as well as master's degree with honors.

== Teaching career ==
Kafi started his professional career by teaching as a lecturer of economics at Birganj Degree College from 16 January 1974. Later he was promoted to assistant professor, then associate professor respectively. He was also one of the entrepreneurs to help establish Birganj Degree College on 3 July 1972.

== Political career ==
Kafi started his political career as a student leader in University of Rajshahi, and by engaging with various social welfare organizations. He joined Jamaat-e-Islami Bangladesh in 1968 and got arrested for political reasons on 29 February 1972 after the independence of Bangladesh. Later, he was acquitted of all the charges and released from jail on 7 December 1973. He became a central leader of Jamaat-e-Islami Bangladesh in October 1989 and held his position until the year 2003. He got elected as a Member of Parliament from Dinajpur-1 constituency in 2001 from Four Party Alliance.

=== Member of Parliament ===
Kafi ran for office for the first time in the Pakistan National Election in 1970. He again ran for office in the 5th parliamentary election in 1991 from Dinajpur-1 constituency on the Jamaat ticket but lost to Awami League candidate Md. Aminul Islam. He ran again in 1996 against his maternal uncle Md. Abdur Rauf Chowdhury of Awami League, and came in the 4th place.

Finally, in the 8th parliamentary election in 2001, as a Four Party Alliance candidate, Kafi beat his uncle Awami League candidate Md. Abdur Rauf Chowdhury by a big margin of 28,172 votes, with a blistering 88,669 votes.

==== Government responsibilities ====
Apart from being a member of parliament, the fresh government formed by the leading party BNP of Four Party Alliance appointed him as a member of the standing committee on land ministry Kafi also served as a member of the standing committee on land ministry. He also visited Canadian Parliament as a member of Bangladesh delegation through Strengthening Parliamentary Democracy (SPD) Project.

== Notable works ==
Kafi was involved in various educational institutions, social and cultural organizations. He has established an orphanage in his home village Nowpara, Birganj Upazila. He is also the founder of Tanzimul Millat Trust, and Islamic Welfare Trust, both of those trusts are located in Dinajpur District, Bangladesh.

One of his biggest achievements as a parliamentarian was the establishment of Birganj Municipality in his constituency in Birganj Upazila (Dinajpur-1). His relentless effort finally made it possible to establish a municipality in Birganj Upazila on 15 June 2002 for the development of the area and the local people.

== Personal life ==
Kafi was married to Jebun Nesa Al Kafi. They had two daughters, and four sons.

== Publications ==
Kafi wrote several novels during his lifetime. His three notable novels are: Jew Girl Rehana Human Tales, Islam Is My Love.

== Illness and death ==
Kafi was suffering from Hepatitis C Liver Cirrhosis. This chronic was long-term and the chronic form lead to his permanent liver scarring (cirrhosis). He went to Thailand for better treatment and was treated in Thailand's famous Bumrungrad International Hospital. Later, he was taken back to the country, and was under strict observation of a medical board of doctors of Bangabandhu Sheikh Mujib Medical University.

On 12 September 2005, Abdullah Al Kafi, died at the age of 61, after suffering from a prolonged Liver Cirrhosis. He died at around 8:50 local time (UTC+06:00) at Bangabandhu Sheikh Mujib Medical University in Dhaka, in the presence of his family. General public and politicians of the ruling and the opposition party sent their deep condolences and conveyed deep sympathy for the bereaved family members and prayed for his departed soul. Then Prime Minister of Bangladesh Khaleda Zia and Leader of the Opposition (Bangladesh) Sheikh Hasina (Current Prime Minister of Bangladesh), as well as the Jatiya Sangsad expressed grave condolence at the death of Abdullah Al Kafi. In memory of him, the parliament session was adjourned Monday without transacting any business of the day following the death of a sitting Jamaat lawmaker from Dinajpur.
