= Manjural Islam =

Manjural Islam may refer to:

- Mohammad Manjural Islam (born 1979), Bangladeshi cricketer
- Manjural Islam Rana (1984–2007), Bangladeshi cricketer
- Md. Manjurul Islam, Bangladeshi politician
