= Syed Ahmed Reza Hossain =

Bangladeshi politician

- সৈয়দ আহমেদ রেজা হোসেন

Member of the Bangladesh Parliament for Dinajpur-1
- In office 15 February 1996 – 12 June 1996
- Preceded by: Md. Aminul Islam
- Succeeded by: Abdur Rauf Chowdhury

Personal details
- Born: Dinajpur District
- Party: Bangladesh Nationalist Party

Syed Ahmed Reza Hossain Bangladesh Nationalist Party politician. He was elected a member of parliament from Dinajpur-1 in February 1996.

== Career ==
Hossain was elected to parliament from Dinajpur-1 as a Bangladesh Nationalist Party candidate in 15 February 1996 Bangladeshi general election. He was defeated from Dinajpur-1 constituency on 12 June 1996 on the nomination of Bangladesh Nationalist Party.
