= Nayabad Mosque =

Mosque in Dinajpur, Bangladesh

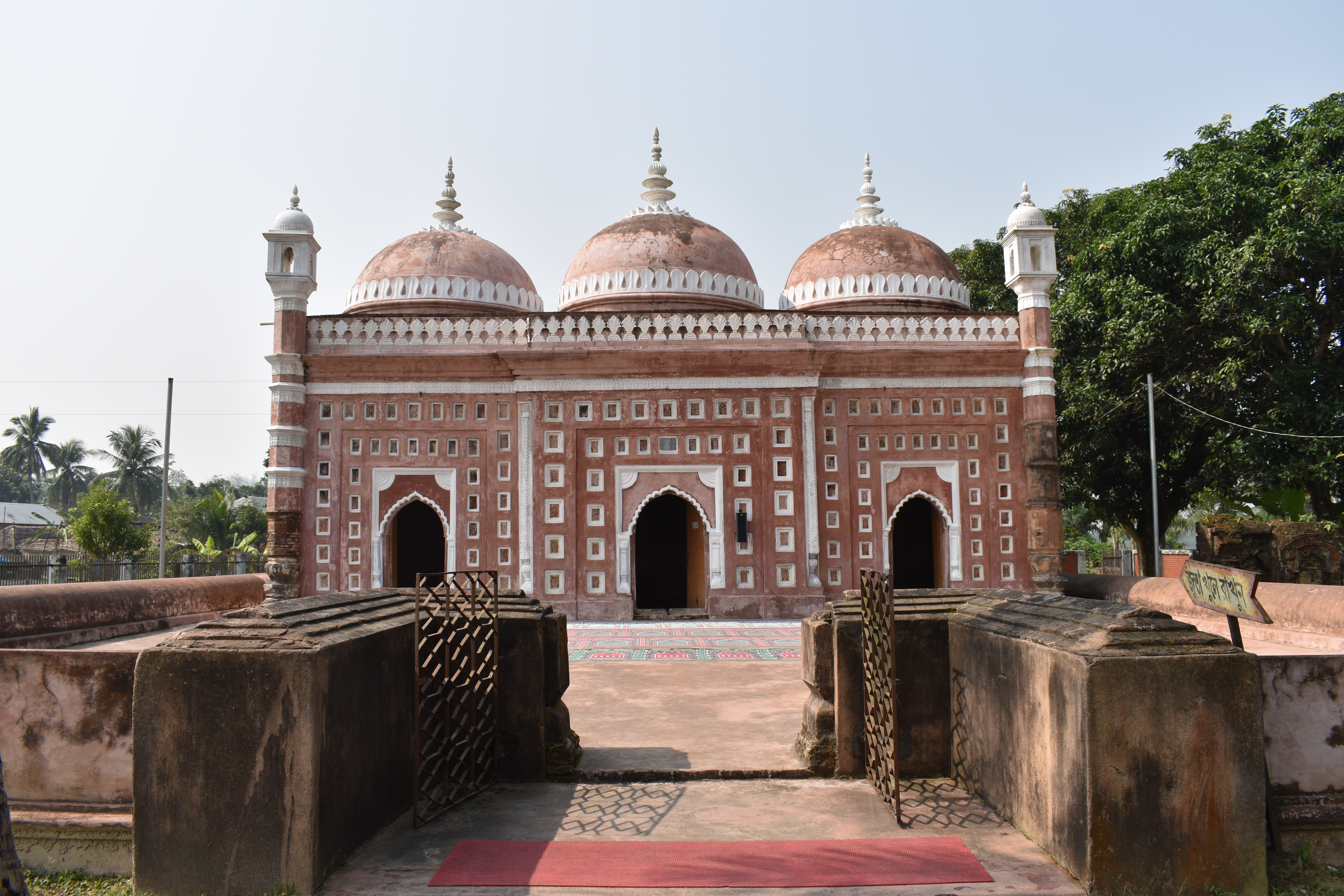

- Location of the mosque in Bangladesh

Religion
- Affiliation: Islam
- Ecclesiastical or organisational status: Mosque
- Status: Active

Location
- Location: Nayabad, Kaharole Upazila, Dinajpur District
- Country: Bangladesh
- Coordinates: 25°46′55″N 88°39′31″E

Architecture
- Type: Mosque architecture
- Style: Mughal
- Completed: 1793 CE

Specifications
- Length: 12.45 m (40.8 ft)
- Width: 5.5 m (18 ft)
- Dome: Three
- Minaret: Four

The Nayabad Mosque (Bengali: নয়াবাদ মসজিদ), also known as the Noyabaad Mosque, is a mosque located in the Nayabad village in Kaharole Upazila, in the Dinajpur District of Bangladesh, beside the Dhepa River. It was built in 1793 CE during the rule of Mughal ruler Shah Alam II. Locals believe it was built by the Muslim architectural workers who came from Persia to build the Kantajew Temple for their own use.

== Architecture ==
The building is oblong, with three entrances on one side. The roof has three domes, and at each corner there is an octagonal minaret with a cupola (two of the cupolas are now missing). The outer dimensions of the building are 12.45 by 5.5 m (40.8 by 18.0 ft), with walls that are 1.1 metres (3.6 ft) thick.

== Gallery ==
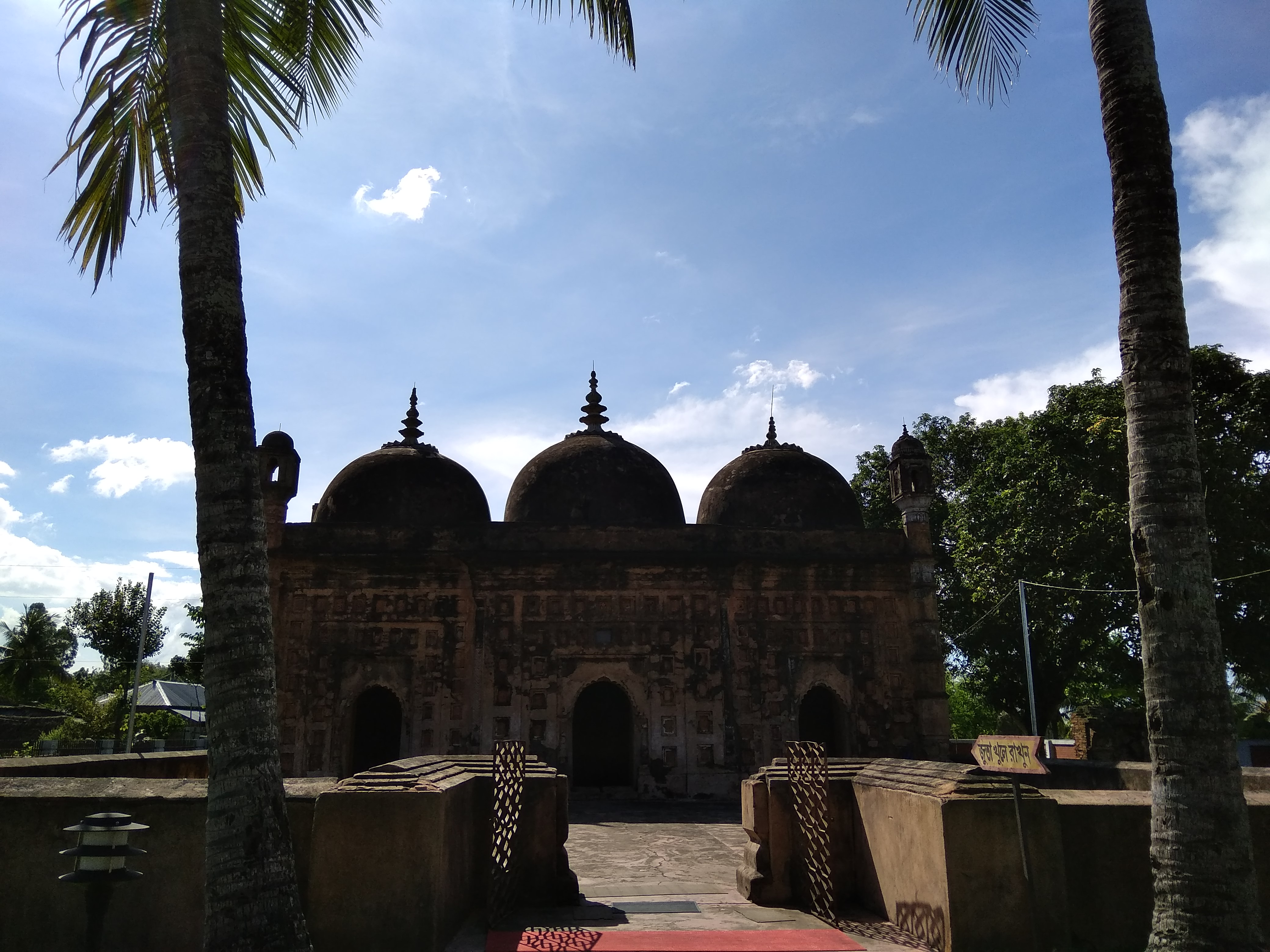
A landscape image of the mosque

== See also ==
- Islam in Bangladesh
- List of mosques in Bangladesh
