= Abdur Rauf Chowdhury =

Bangladeshi politician

Abdur Rouf Chowdhury
- আব্দুর রউফ চৌধুরি

Member of the Bangladesh Parliament for Dinajpur-1
- In office 1996–2001
- Preceded by: Syed Ahmed Reza Hossain
- Succeeded by: Abdullah Al Kafi

State Minister for Post and Telecommunications Ministry

Personal details
- Born: 1929 or 1930
- Died: October 20, 2007 (aged 77) Bochaganj, Dinajpur
- Party: Bangladesh Awami League

Abdur Rouf Chowdhury (died 20 October 2007) was a Bangladesh Awami League politician and a former member of parliament from Dinajpur-1.

== Career ==
Chowdhury was president of the Dinajpur district Awami League. He was elected to parliament in 1996 from Dinajpur-1. He was the state minister for post and telecommunication in the first Sheikh Hasina Cabinet.

== Death and legacy ==
Chowdhury died on 20 October 2007 in Bochaganj upazila in Dinajpur district. He had one son and five daughters. In 2019, his son, Khalid Mahmud Chowdhury, was state minister of the Ministry of Shipping.
