= Abdul Malek Sarkar =

Bangladeshi politician

- আব্দুল মালেক সরকার

Member of Bangladesh Parliament

Member of Parliament for Dinajpur-1
- In office 1986–1988
- Preceded by: Jamiur Uddin Sarker
- Succeeded by: Anisul Huq Chowdhury

Personal details
- Party: Jatiya Party

Abdul Malek Sarkar is a Jatiya Party (Ershad) politician and a former member of parliament for Dinajpur-1.

== Career ==
Sarkar was elected to parliament from Dinajpur-1 as a Jatiya Party candidate in 1986.
