= Dinajpur-1 =

Constituency of Bangladesh's Jatiya Sangsad

Coordinates: 25.86°N 88.65°E

- Constituency for the Jatiya Sangsad
- District: Dinajpur District
- Division: Rangpur Division
- Electorate: 417,133 (2026)

Current constituency
- Created: 1973
- Party: Bangladesh Nationalist Party
- Member: Md. Manjurul Islam
- ← 5 Thakurgaon-3 7 Dinajpur-2 →

Dinajpur-1 is a constituency represented in the Jatiya Sangsad (National Parliament) of Bangladesh since 2026 by Md. Manjurul Islam of the Bangladesh Nationalist Party.

== Boundaries ==
The constituency encompasses Birganj and Kaharole upazilas.

== History ==
The constituency was created for the first general elections in newly independent Bangladesh, held in 1973.

== Members of Parliament ==
Election	Member	Party
1973	Kamaruddin Ahmed	Awami League
1979	Jamiruddin Sarkar	Bangladesh Nationalist Party
Major Boundary Changes
1986	Abdul Malek Sarkar	Awami League
1988	Anisul Haque Chowdhury	Jatiya Party
1991	Md. Aminul Islam	Awami League
Feb 1996	Syed Ahmed Reza Hossain	Bangladesh Nationalist Party
Jun 1996	Abdur Rauf Chowdhury	Awami League
2001	Abdullah Al Kafi	Bangladesh Jamaat-e-Islami
2005 by-election	Manoranjon Shill Gopal	Independent
2008	Manoranjon Shill Gopal	Awami League
2024	Zakaria Zaka	Independent
2026	Md. Manjurul Islam	Bangladesh Nationalist Party

== Elections ==
=== Elections in the 2020s ===
General election 2026: Dinajpur-1
Party	Candidate	Votes	%	±%
BNP	Md. Manjurul Islam			
Jamaat	Md. Matiur Rahman			
Majority				
Turnout				
Registered electors		417,133		
BNP gain from AL				

=== Elections in the 2010s ===
General Election 2014: Dinajpur-1
Party	Candidate	Votes	%	±%
AL	Manoranjon Shill Gopal	124,314	83.3	+26.7
WPB	Abdul Haq	24,973	16.7	N/A
Majority		99,341	66.5	+52.3
Turnout		149,287	49.0	−43.9
AL hold				

=== Elections in the 2000s ===
General Election 2008: Dinajpur-1
Party	Candidate	Votes	%	±%
AL	Manoranjon Shill Gopal	143,097	56.6	
Jamaat	Mohammed Hanif	107,168	42.4	
CPB	Md. Altaf Hussain	1,596	0.6	
IAB	Md. Jamal Uddin	898	0.4	
Majority		35,929	14.2	
Turnout		252,759	92.9	
AL gain from Jamaat				

Abdullah Al Kafi died in September 2005. Independent candidate Manoranjon Shill Gopal was elected in a December by-election.

General Election 2001: Dinajpur-1
Party	Candidate	Votes	%	±%
Jamaat	Abdullah Al Kafi	88,669	44.9	+31.4
AL	Abdur Rauf Chowdhury	৬০, ১৯৭	30.5	−11.7
IJOF	Manoranjon Shill Gopal	৪০,৬২১	20.6	N/A
JSD	Md. Abdul Khaleque Sarkar	6,848	3.5	N/A
CPB	Md. Altaf Hussain	760	0.4	−0.1
Independent	Abdul Malek Sarkar	279	0.1	N/A
Majority		28,472	14.4	−5.2
Turnout		197,374	85.2	+9.4
Jamaat gain from AL				

=== Elections in the 1990s ===
General Election June 1996: Dinajpur-1
Party	Candidate	Votes	%	±%
AL	Abdur Rauf Chowdhury	60,681	42.2	−6.1
BNP	Syed Ahmed Reza Hossain	32,437	22.5	+10.8
JP(E)	Manoranjon Shill Gopal	29,583	20.6	+13.5
Jamaat	Abdullah Al Kafi	19,463	13.5	−17.1
CPB	Md. Altaf Hussain	756	0.5	N/A
Jatiya Samajtantrik Dal-JSD	Md. Abdul Khaleque	690	0.5	N/A
Bangladesh Janata Party	Md. Ahad Ali	283	0.2	N/A
Majority		28,244	19.6	+1.9
Turnout		143,893	75.8	+11.9
AL hold				

General Election 1991: Dinajpur-1
Party	Candidate	Votes	%	±%
AL	Md. Aminul Islam	56,191	48.3	
Jamaat	Abdullah Al Kafi	35,598	30.6	
BNP	Md. A. Mannan	13,603	11.7	
JP(E)	Md. Anisul Haq	8,203	7.1	
NDP	Manoranjon Shill Gopal	2,194	1.9	
Jatiya Samajtantrik Dal-JSD	Md. Abdul Khaleque	338	0.3	
Zaker Party	Md. Nazrul Islam	232	0.2	
Majority		20,593	17,7	
Turnout		116,359	63.9	
AL gain from				
