= Md. Manjurul Islam =

Bangladesh Nationalist Party politician

Manjurul Islam Manju

Member of Parliament
- Incumbent
- Assumed office 17 February 2026
- Preceded by: Zakaria Zaka
- Constituency: Dinajpur-1

Personal details
- Born: March 5, 1962 (age 64) Bhabki, Birganj Upazila, Dinajpur District, Bangladesh
- Party: Bangladesh Nationalist Party
- Spouse: Laizu Islam
- Parent(s): Md. Khademul Islam (father), Nur Jahan Begum (mother)
- Occupation: Politician, Businessman
- Profession: Politician

Md. Manjurul Islam is a Bangladeshi politician with the Bangladesh Nationalist Party. He was elected as the Member of Parliament for the Dinajpur-1 constituency in the 2026 Bangladeshi general election held on 12 February 2026.

== Early life and political career ==
Monjurul Islam was born into a Muslim family in Bhabki village of Birganj Upazila, Dinajpur District. From his student life, he became involved in the politics of the Bangladesh Nationalist Party. In the 13th Jatiya Sangsad elections held on 13 February 2026, he contested from the Dinajpur-1 (Birganj–Kaharol) constituency as a nominee of the BNP and was elected as a Member of Parliament.
