= Kantajew Temple =

Hindu temple in Dinajpur, Bangladesh

Kantajiu Temple
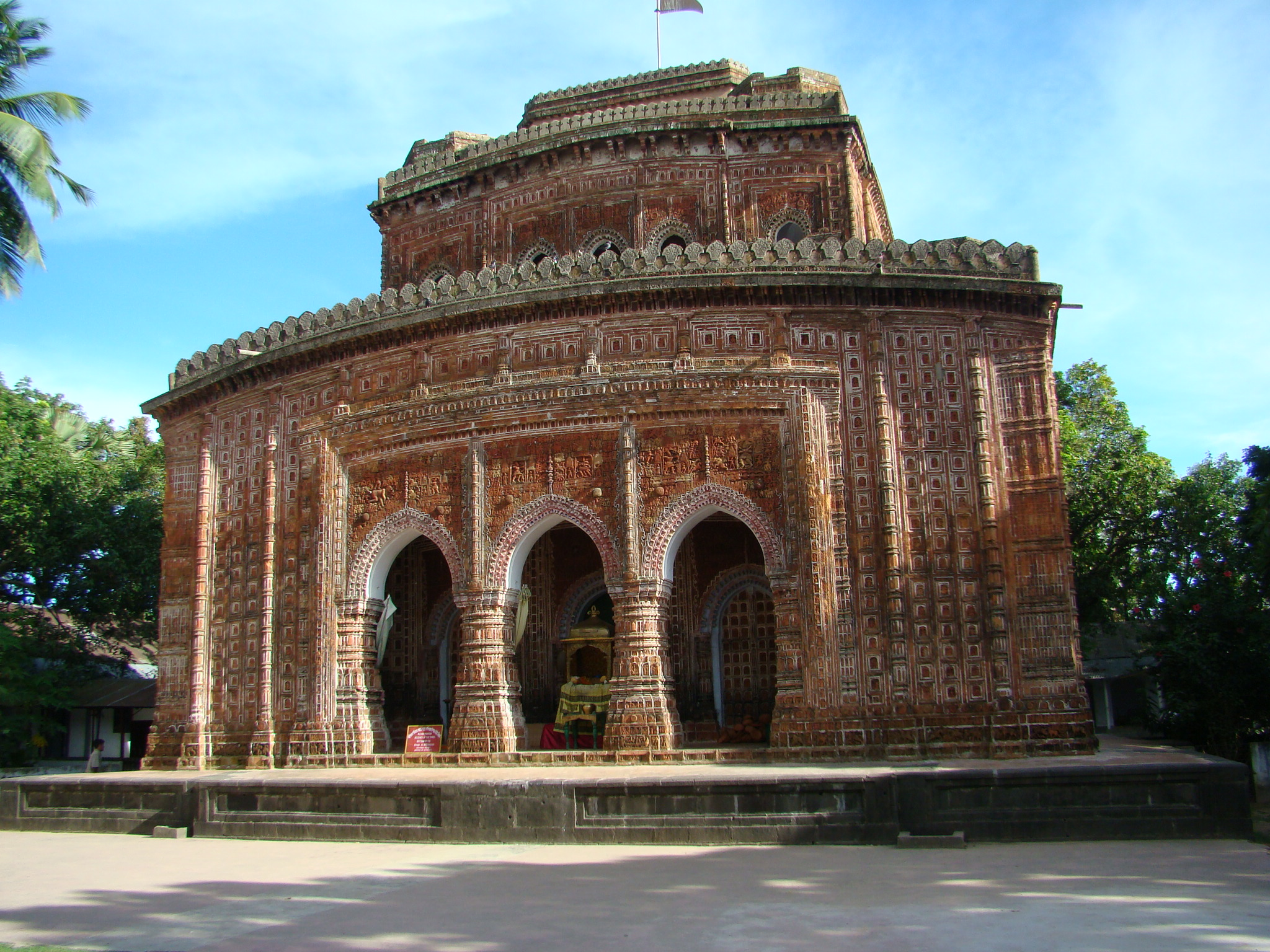

- Location in Bangladesh

Religion
- Affiliation: Hinduism
- District: Dinajpur
- Deity: Kantaji (Krishna) Rukmini
- Festival: Rash mela

Location
- Location: near the Hajee Mohammed Danesh Science and Technology University, about 12 kilometres
- State: Rangpur Division
- Country: Bangladesh
- Coordinates: 25°47′26″N 88°40′00″E

Architecture
- Type: Nava-ratna
- Creator: Raja Ramnath
- Completed: 1722 CE

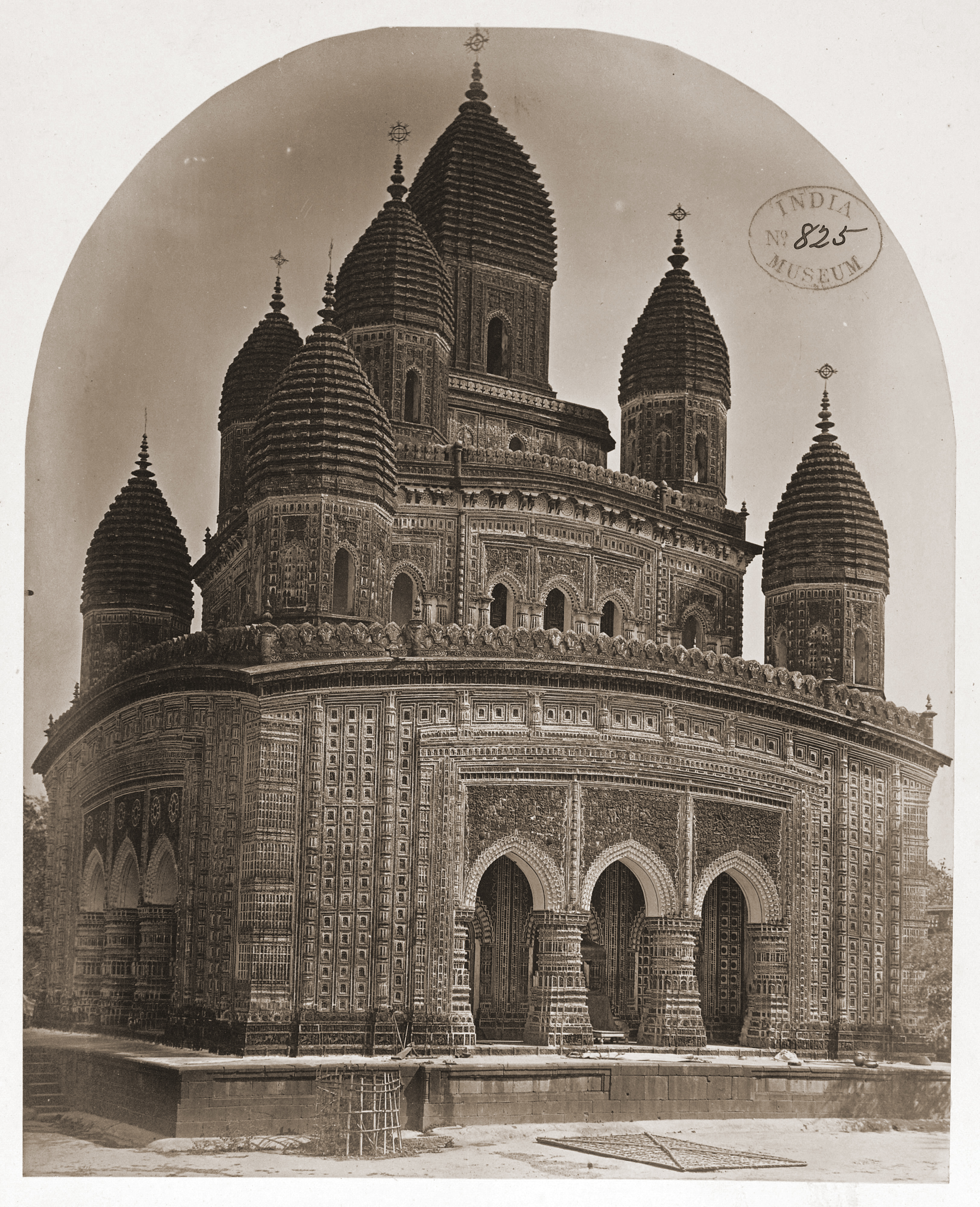
A southern view of Kantojiu Temple in 1871 showing the nine spires that were subsequently destroyed in an earthquake

Kantanagar Temple, commonly known as Kantaji Temple or Kantajew Temple (Bengali: কান্তজিউ মন্দির) at Kantanagar, is a Hindu temple in Dinajpur, Bangladesh. The temple is an 18th century religious edifice. The temple belongs to the Hindu Kanta or Krishna, and is most popular with the Rukmini-Krishna devotees (assembly of memorable love) in Bengal. This temple is dedicated to Krishna and his wife Rukmini. Built by Maharaja Pran Nath, its construction started in 1704 CE and ended in the reign of his son Raja Ramnath in 1752 CE. It is an example of terracotta architecture in Bangladesh and once had nine spires, but all were destroyed in an 1897 earthquake.

== Architecture ==
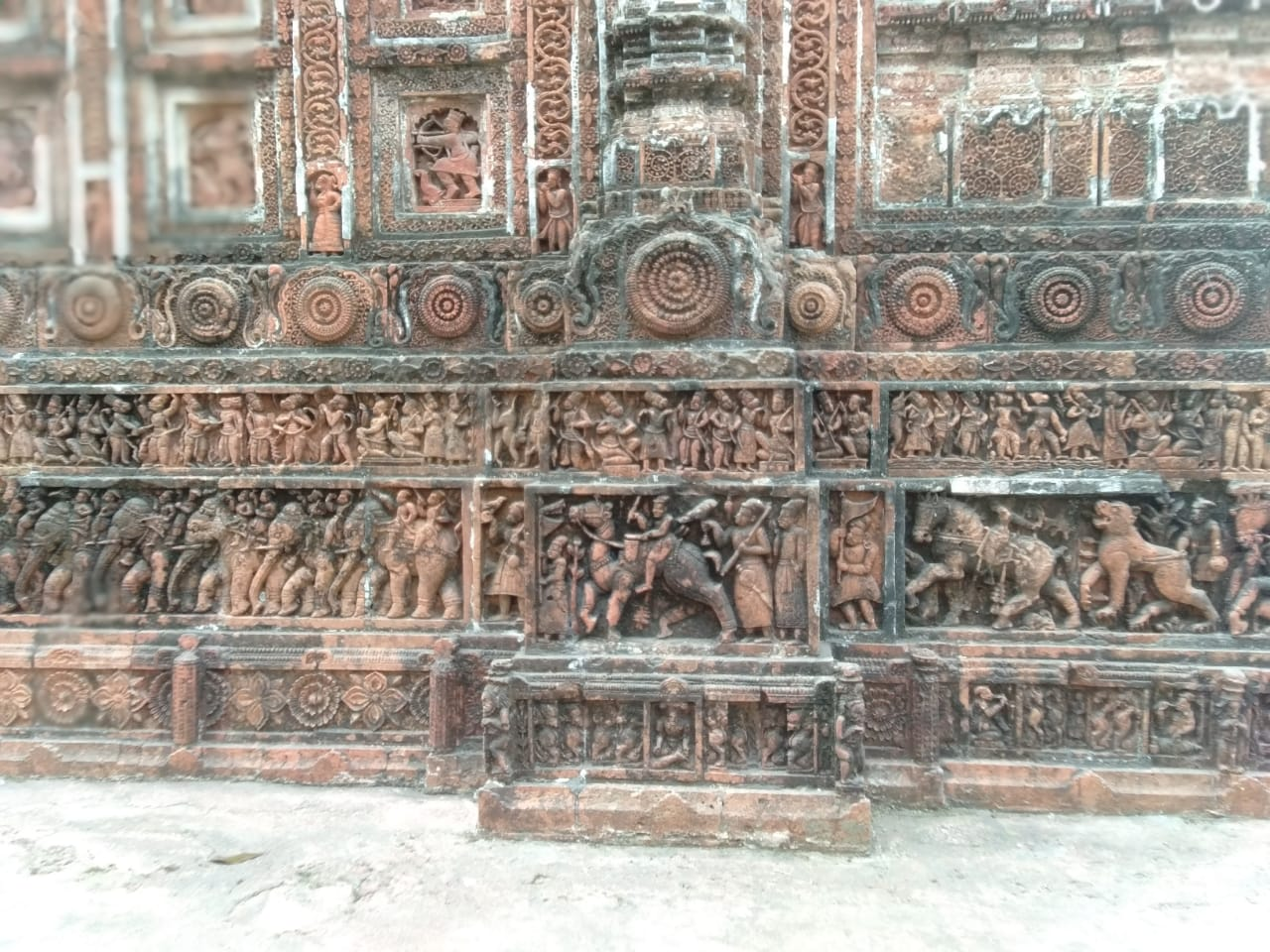
Architecture of the temple

The temple was built in a navaratna (nine-spired) style before the destruction caused by the earthquake of 1897. The characteristic features of the erections are the four centered and wide multi-cusped arches, the plastered surface of the walls having immense rectangular and square panelings, prominence of the central archway and the central mihirab by making the slightly larger and setting in a projected fronton in the outside directions, the use of ornamental turrets on the either side of the fronton, the semi-octagonal mirirab apertures, the archway opening under half-domes, the Persian muqarnas work in stucco inside the half-domes over the entrance arches and mihrab niches, the bulbous outline of the domes with constructed necks, domes on octagonal drums with lotus and kalasa finials as the crowning elements, the round pendentives to make up the phase of transition for the domes and the multi-faced corner towers rising high above the horizontal merloned parapets.

== Gallery ==
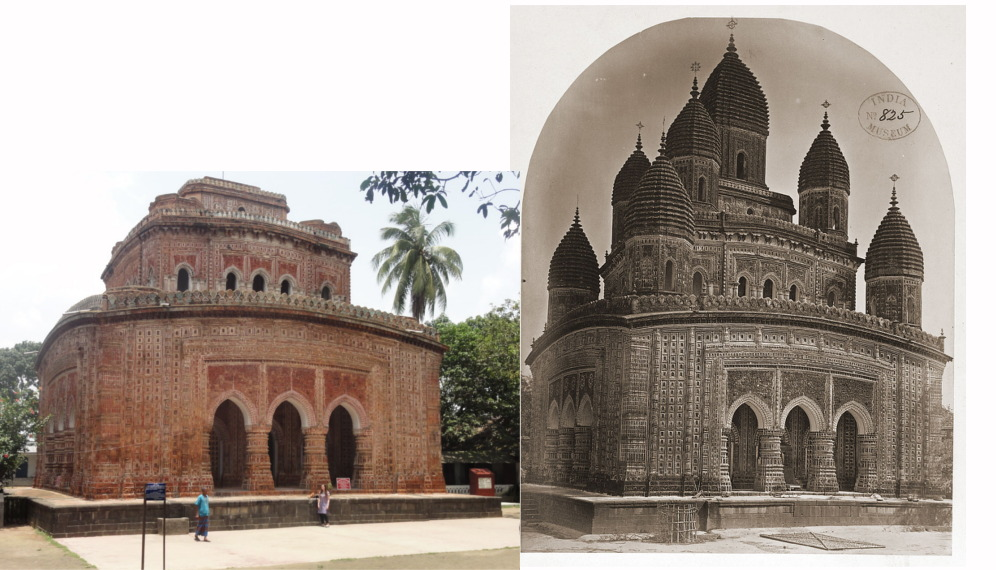
Comparison

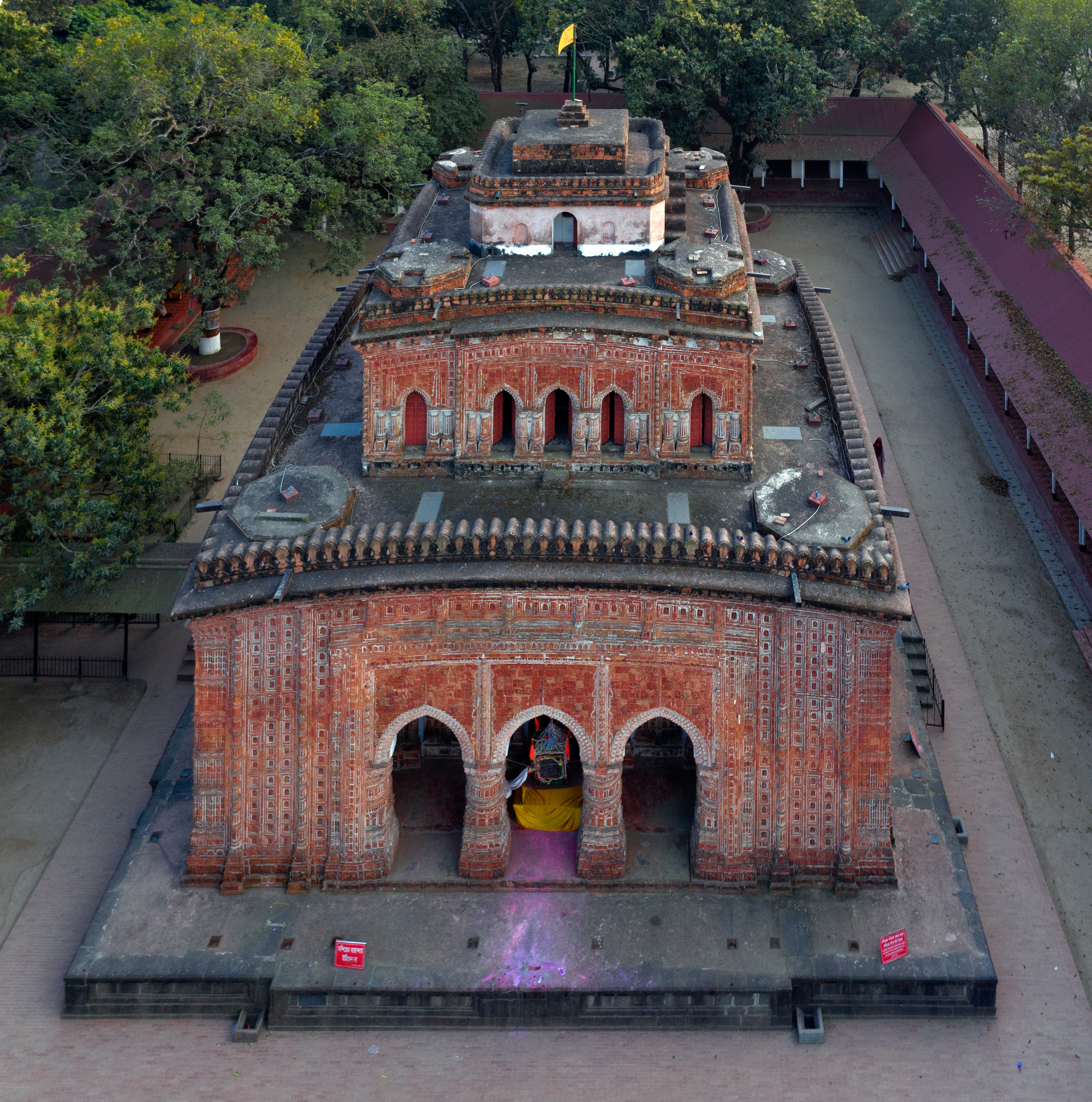

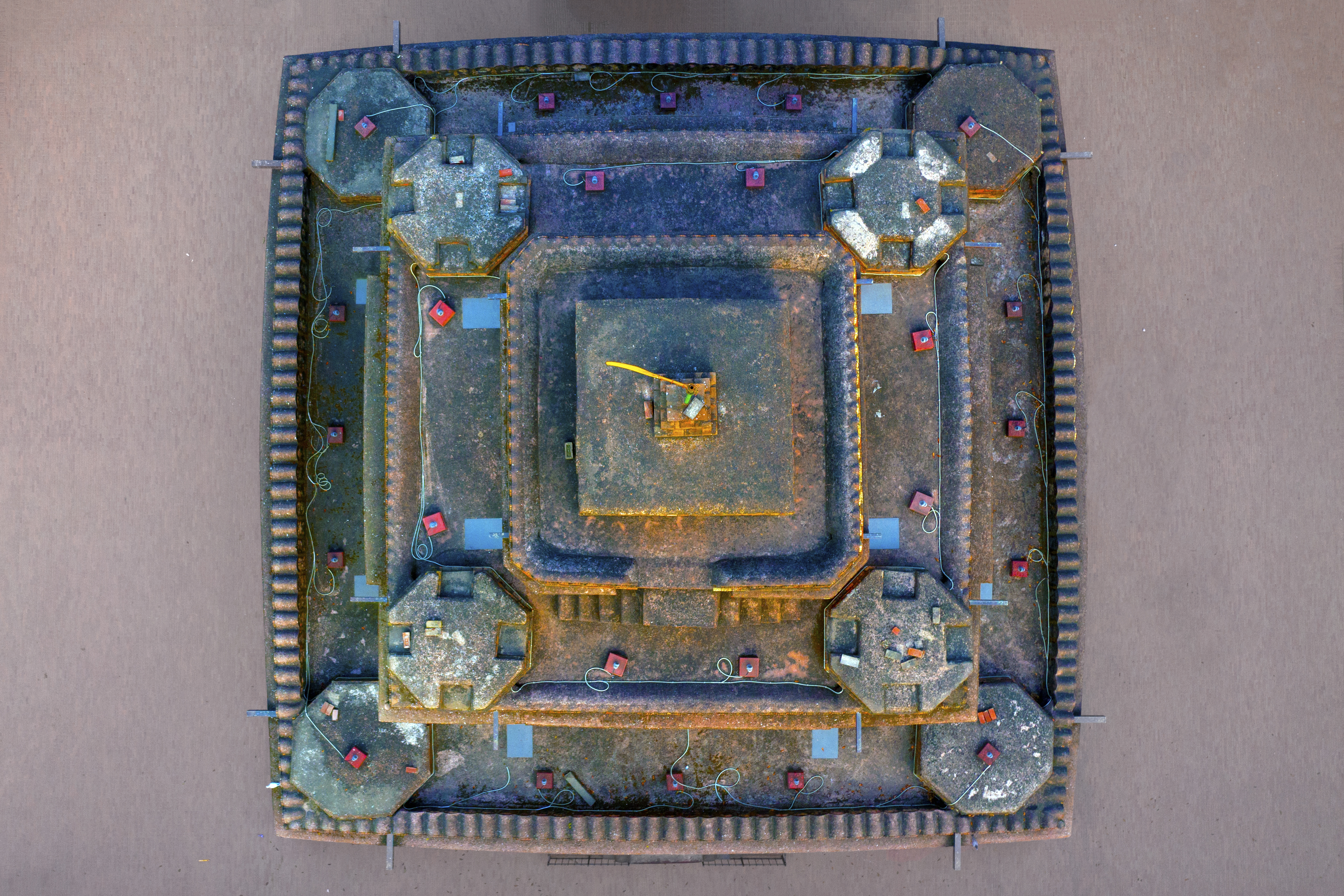
Top view of the temple

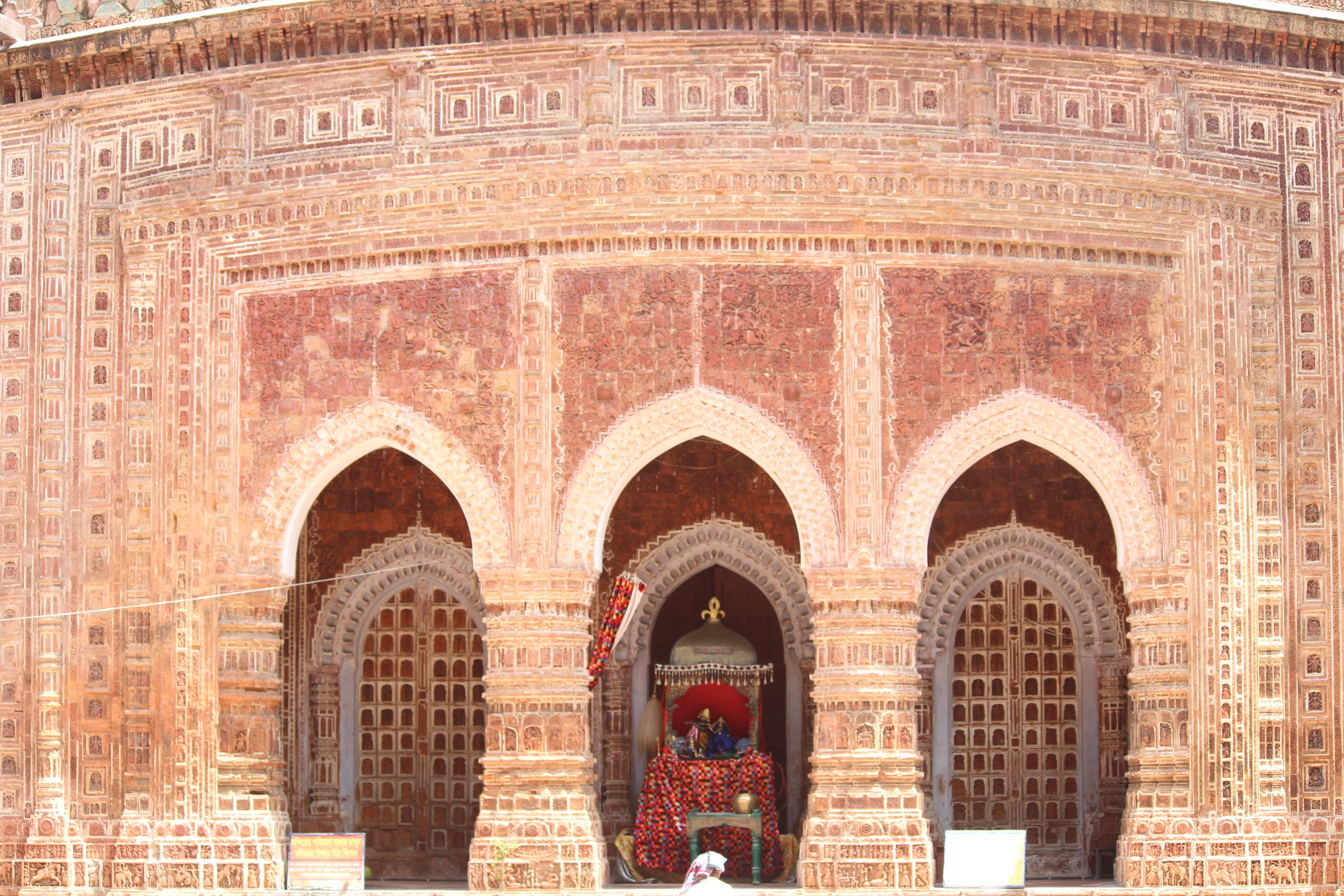
Temple front

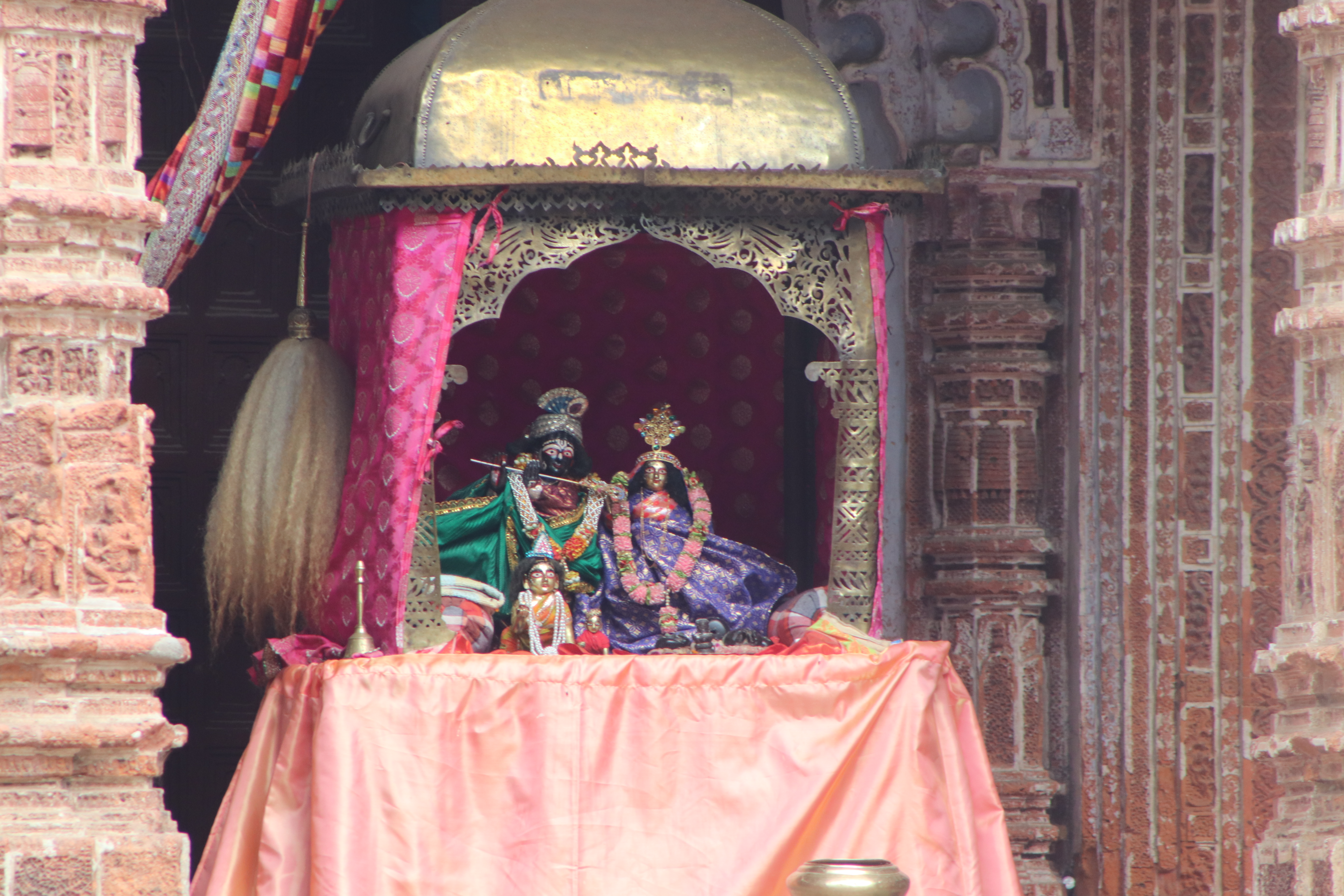
Rukmini-Krishna statue in Kantajew Temple

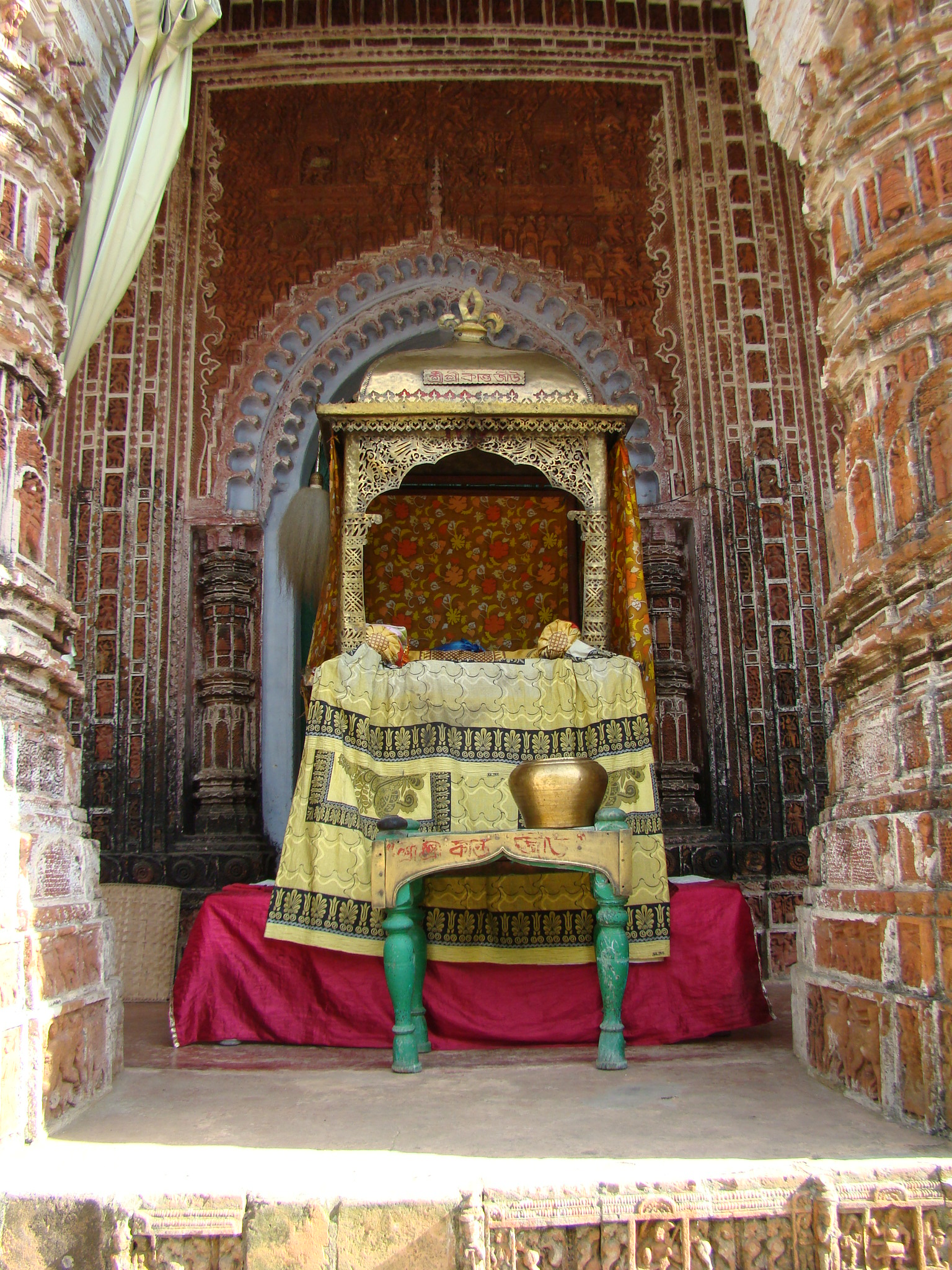

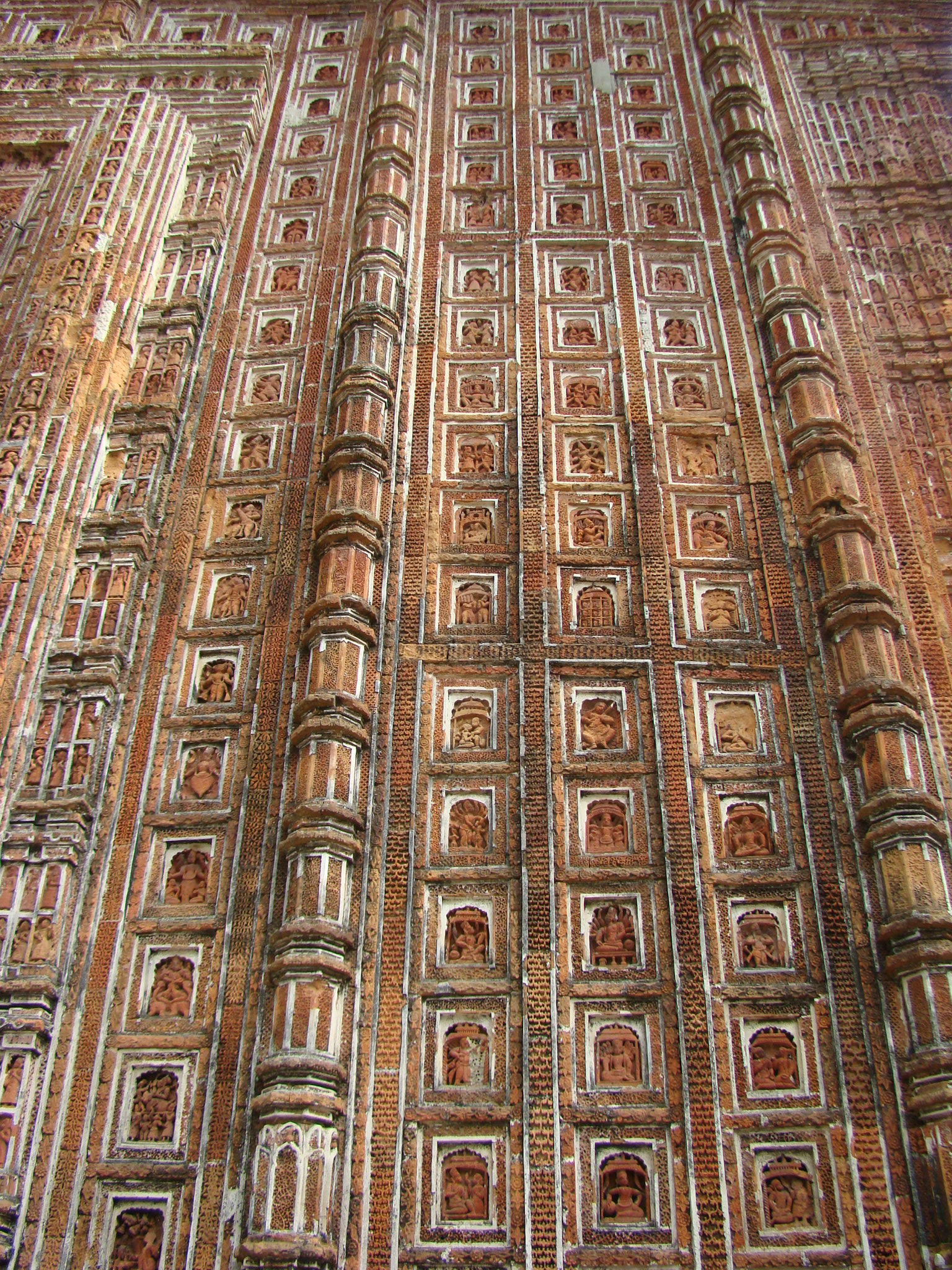
Terracotta

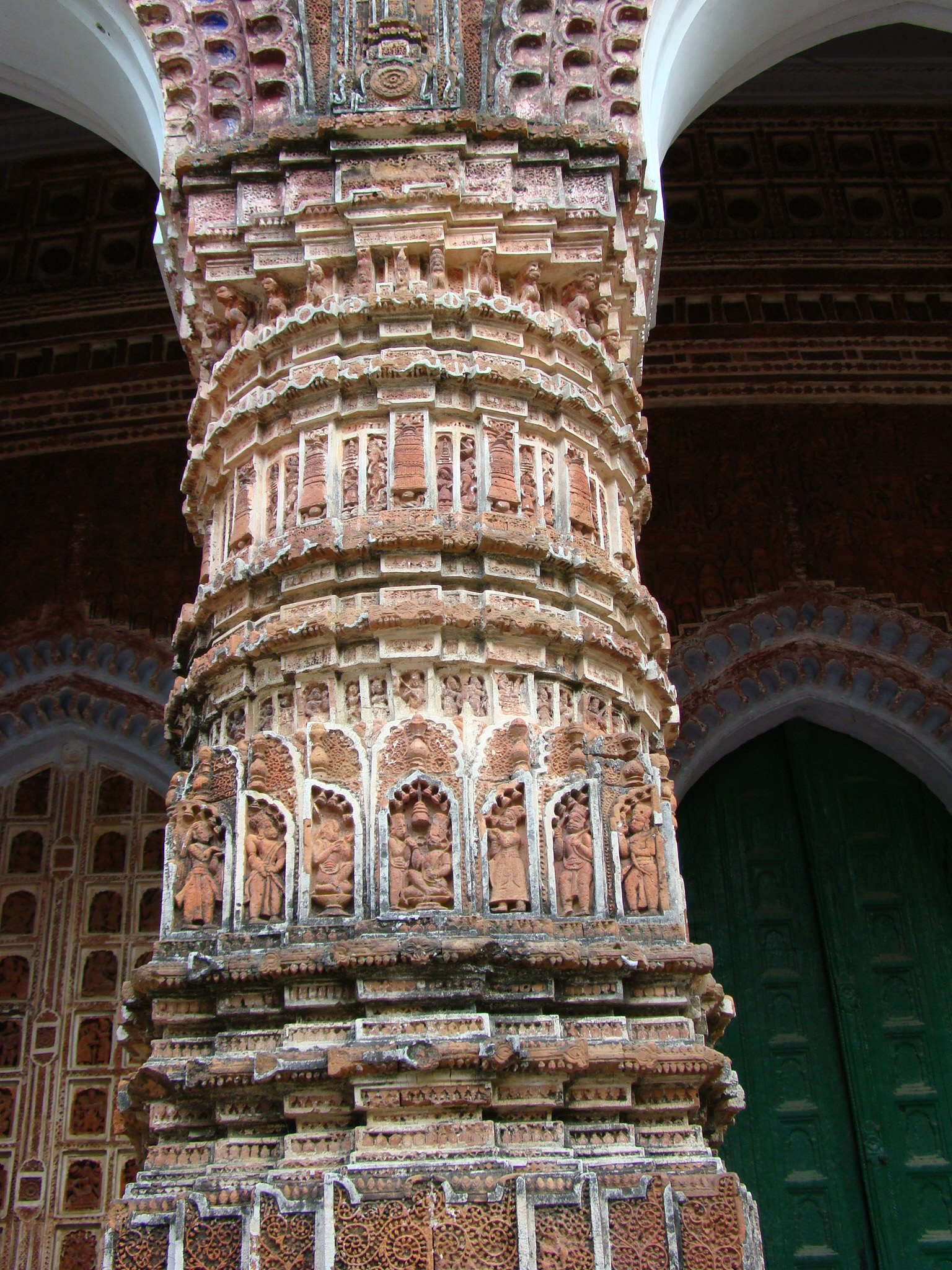
Terracotta designs on columns near the entrance

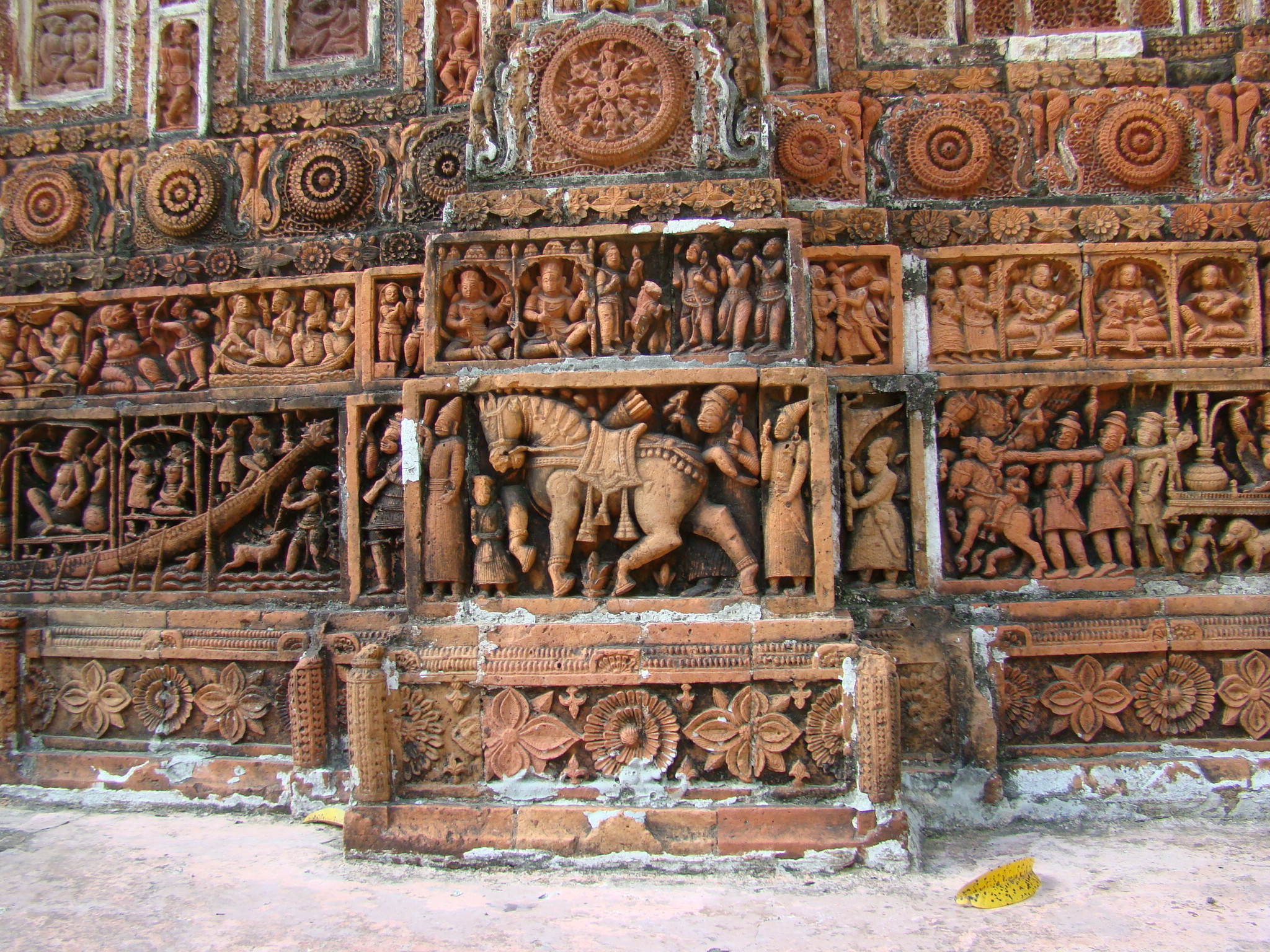
Terracotta designs outside the temple

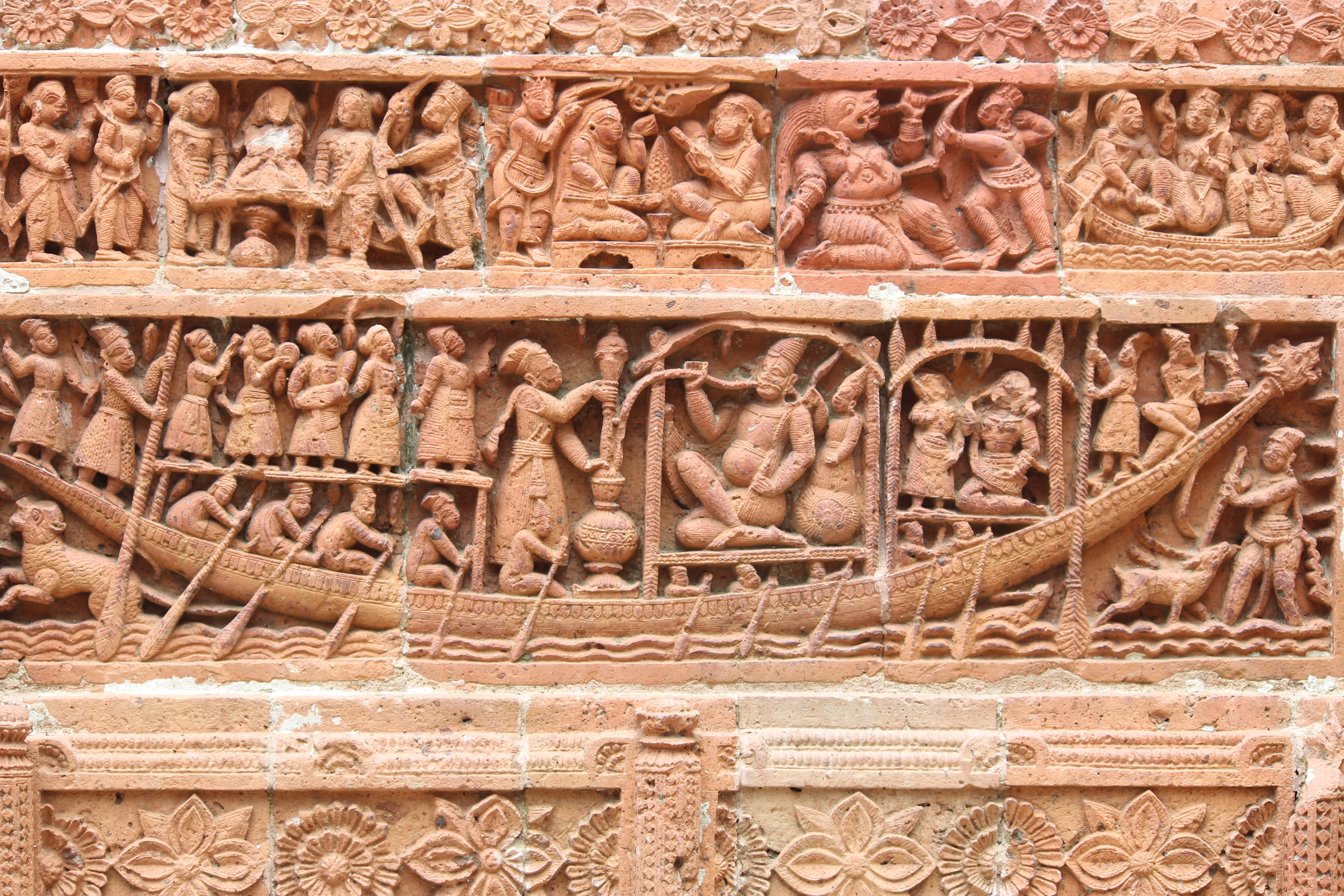
Terracotta

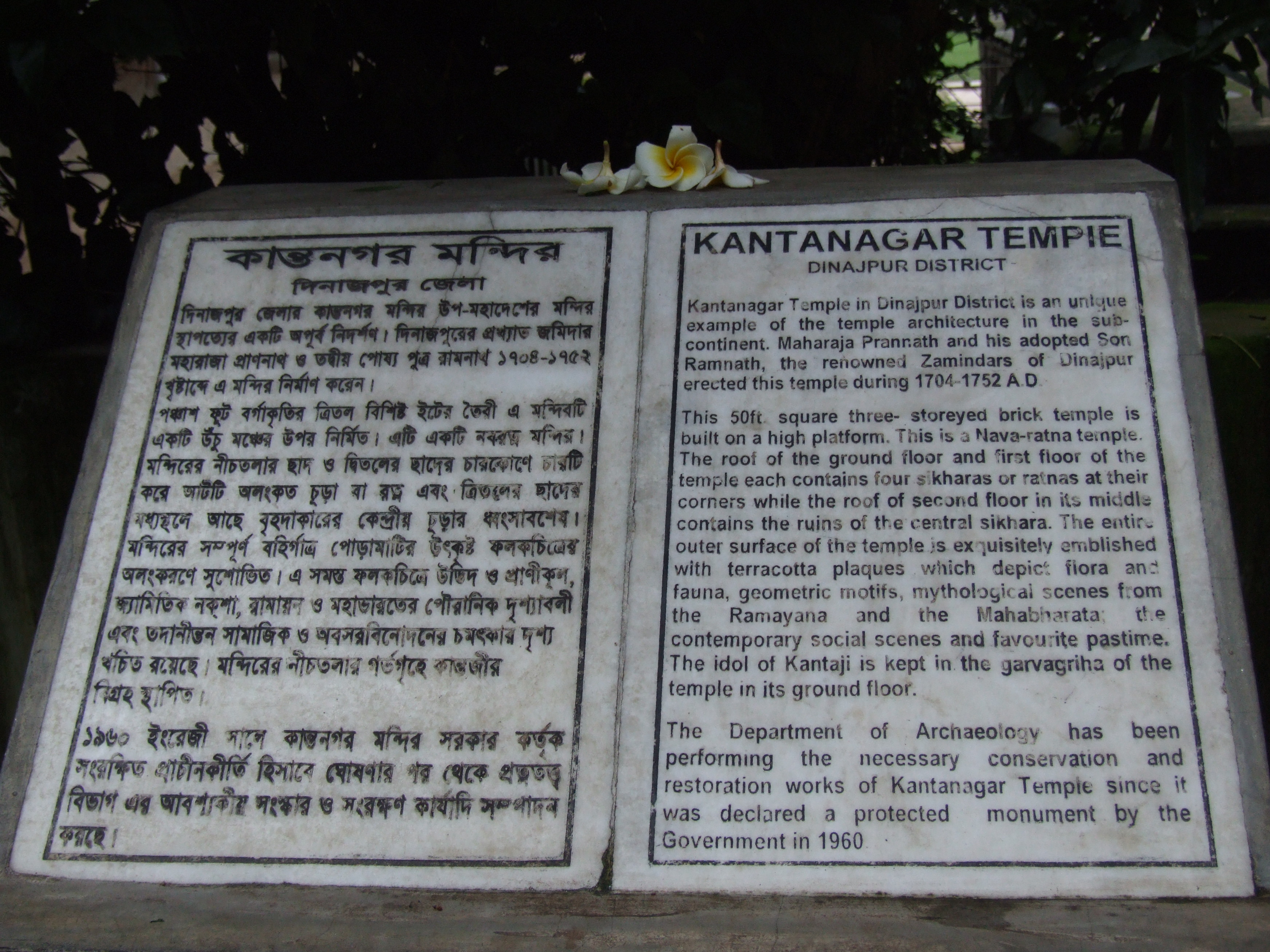
Description of the temple

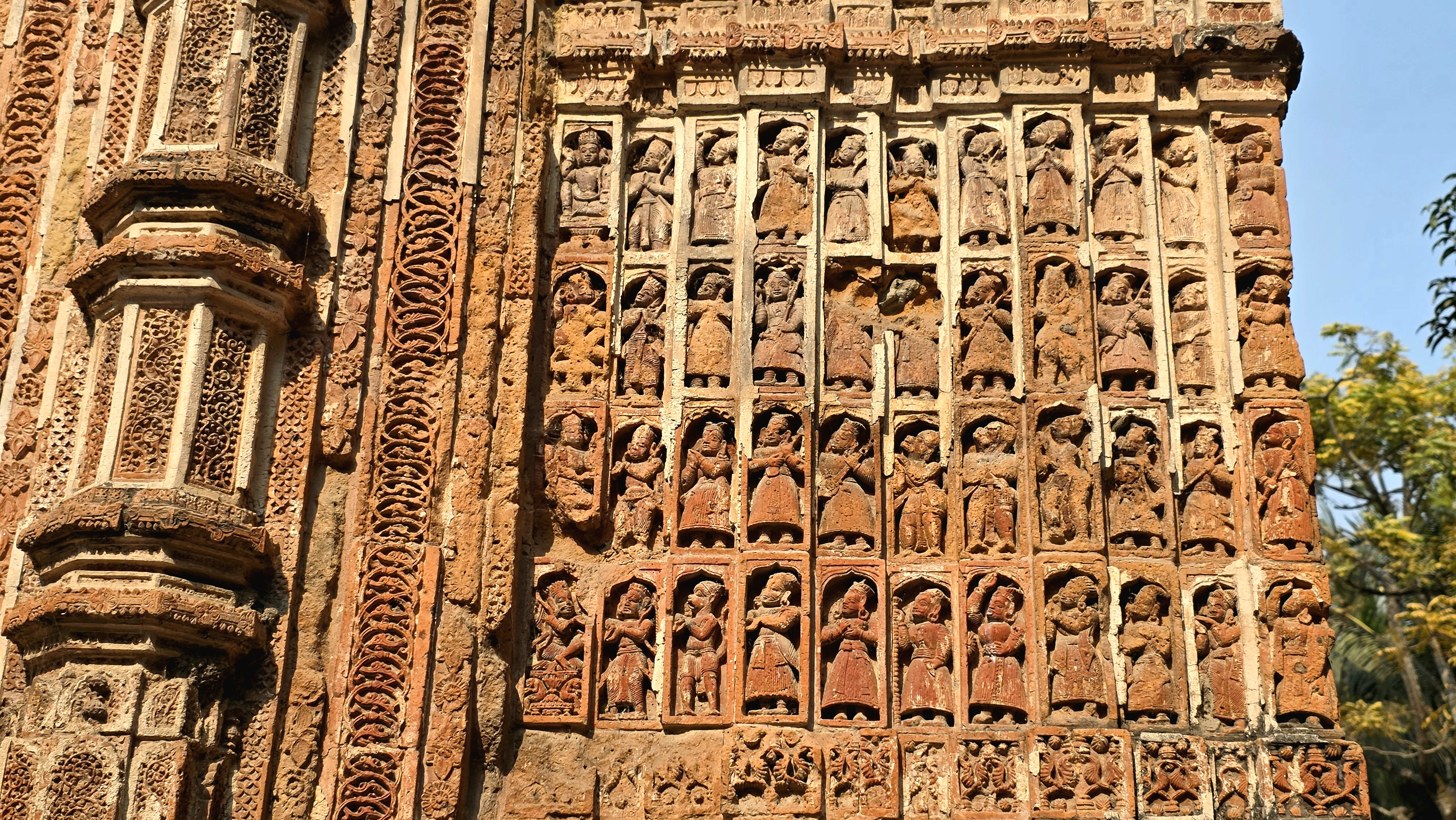
Terracotta

== See also ==
- Architecture of Bangladesh
- List of archaeological sites in Bangladesh
- Nayabad Mosque, reputedly built by the architects of Kantajew temple, for their own use
