= Shatagram Union =

Union in Rangpur, Division Bangladesh

Shatagram Union শতগ্রাম ইউনিয়ন
- Union
- Location in Bangladesh
- Coordinates: 26°0′0″N 88°35′0″E
- Country: Bangladesh
- Division: Rangpur Division
- District: Dinajpur District
- Upazila: Birganj Upazila

Government
  - Type: Union council
- Time zone: UTC+6 (BST)
- Website: shatagramup.dinajpur.gov.bd

Shatagram Union (Bengali: শতগ্রাম ইউনিয়ন) is a union parishad of Birgonj Upazila, in Dinajpur District, Rangpur Division, Bangladesh. The union has an area of 91.61 square kilometres (35.37 sq mi) and as of 2001 had a population of 31,714. There are 18 villages and 18 mouzas in the union.
