= Anisul Haque Chowdhury (Dinajpur politician) =

Bangladeshi politician

- আনিসুল হক চৌধুরী

Member of Parliament from Dinajpur-1
- In office 1988–1990
- Preceded by: Abdul Malek Sarkar
- Succeeded by: Md. Aminul Islam

Personal details
- Born: Dinajpur District
- Party: Jatiya Party

Anisul Haque Chowdhury is a politician from the Dinajpur District of Bangladesh and an elected member of parliament from Dinajpur-1.

== Career ==
Chowdhury was elected to parliament from Dinajpur-1 as an independent candidate in 1988. He was defeated from Dinajpur-1 constituency in 1991 on the nomination of Jatiya party.
