= Md. Aminul Islam (politician) =

Bangladeshi politician

- মো. আমিনুল ইসলাম

Member of the Bangladesh Parliament for Dinajpur-1
- In office 1991 – February 1996
- Preceded by: Satish Chandra Roy
- Succeeded by: Anisul Haque Chowdhury

Personal details
- Born: Dinajpur District
- Party: Bangladesh Awami League

Md. Aminul Islam is a politician from the Dinajpur District of Bangladesh and an elected a member of parliament from Dinajpur-1.

== Career ==
Aminul was elected to parliament from Dinajpur-1 as a Bangladesh Awami League candidate in 1991.
