= Pirganj Upazila, Thakurgaon =

Upazila in Thakurgaon District, Bangladesh

Pirganj পীরগঞ্জ
- Upazila
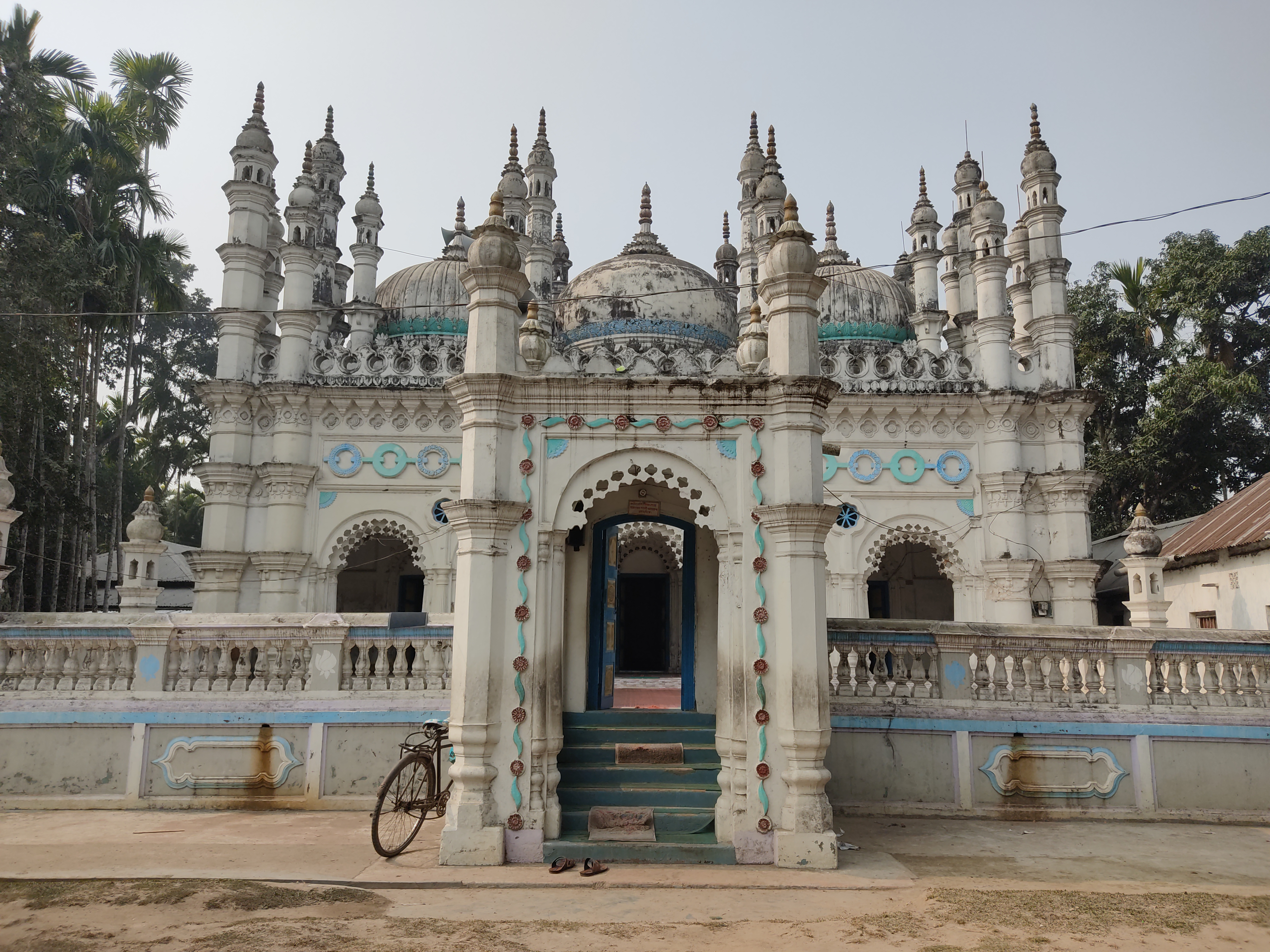
- Jamalpur Zamindar Bari Jame Masjid

- Coordinates: 25°51.3′N 88°22′E
- Country: Bangladesh
- Division: Rangpur
- District: Thakurgaon

Area
  - Total: 353.99 km^{2} (136.68 sq mi)

Population (2022)
  - Total: 265,159
  - Density: 749.06/km^{2} (1,940.1/sq mi)
- Time zone: UTC+6 (BST)
- Postal code: 5110
- Website: Official Map of Pirganj

Pirganj (Bengali: পীরগঞ্জ) is an upazila of Thakurgaon district in Rangpur Division, Bangladesh.

== Geography ==
Pirganj Upazila, having an area of 353.99 sq km, is located in between 25°40' and 25°59' north latitudes and in between 88°15' and 88°22' east longitudes.

The upazila is bounded by Thakurgaon Sadar Upazila in the north, Birganj and Bochaganj upazilas in Dinajpur District in the east, Kaliaganj and Hemtabad CD blocks in Uttar Dinajpur district, West Bengal, India, in the south and Ranisankail Upazila in the west.

=== Rivers ===
There are 3 rivers in Pirganj upazila namely, Tangon River, Kahalai river and Lachchi river.

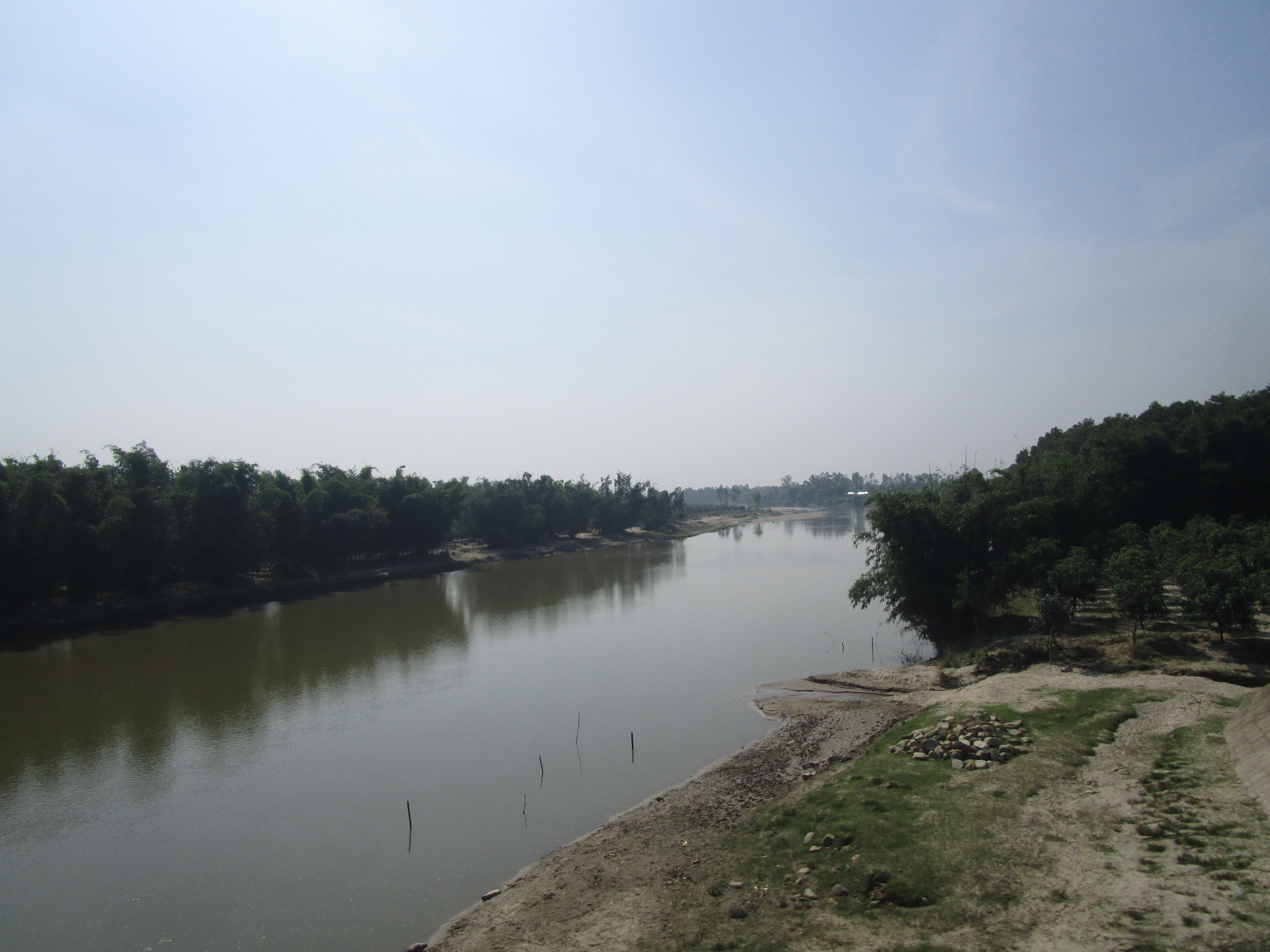
Tangon River at Sagoni

== Demographics ==
According to the 2022 Bangladeshi census, Pirganj Upazila had 67,184 households and a population of 265,159. 9.08% of the population were under 5 years of age. Pirganj had a literacy rate (age 7 and over) of 74.77%: 78.93% for males and 70.67% for females, and a sex ratio of 99.33 males for every 100 females. 46,231 (17.44%) lived in urban areas.

According to the 2011 Census of Bangladesh, Pirganj Upazila had 58,299 households and a population of 243,535. 55,284 (22.70%) were under 10 years of age. Pirganj had a literacy rate (age 7 and over) of 47.81%, compared to the national average of 51.8%, and a sex ratio of 987 females per 1000 males. 27,700 (11.37%) lived in urban areas. Ethnic population was 2,379 (0.98%), of which Santal were 2,232.

As of the 1991 Bangladesh census, Pirganj has a population of 183,292 spread across 35,912 households. Males constituted 51.69% of the population and females 48.31%. This upazila's eighteen up population is 92,296. Pirganj has an average literacy rate of 29.3% (7+ years), and the national average of 32.4% literate.

=== Ethnicity and religion ===
Religions in Pirganj Upazila (2022)
Religion	Percent
Islam	70.46%
Hinduism	28.31%
Christianity	1.00%
Other or not stated	0.23%

Population by religion in Union/Paurashava
Union/Paurashava	Muslim	Hindu	Others
Pirganj Paurashava	28,880	2,490	30
Bairchuna Union	18,934	5,178	921
Bhomradaha Union	16,292	7,085	147
Daulatpur Union	8,293	9,628	271
Hajipur Union	20,710	5,320	18
Jabarhat Union	18,976	8,097	989
Khangaon Union	12,110	10,033	111
Kosha Raniganj Union	16,362	7,125	65
Pirganj Union	18,071	2,810	258
Sengaon Union	15,663	7,699	363
Syedpur Union	12,537	9,602	83

🟩 Muslim majority 🟧 Hindu majority

Bengali Muslims are the largest group followed by Bengali Hindus (mainly Rajbanshi). Ethnic population is 2405 (0.91%) of which Santal are 1996.

== Administration ==
UNO: Md. Golam Rabbani Sarder .

Pirganj was primarily formed as a thana in 1870 and converted into an upazila on 7 November 1983.

Pirganj Upazila is divided into Pirganj Municipality and ten union parishads: Bairchuna, Bhomradaha, Daulatpur, Hazipur, Jabarhat, Khangaon, Kosharaniganj, Pirganj, Saidpur, and Sengaon. The union parishads are subdivided into 168 mauzas and 168 villages.

== Education ==
Pirganj has a number of schools and colleges has quite popular around the whole district. The education system is divided into five levels: primary (from grades 1 to 5), junior (from grades 6 to 8), secondary (from grades 9 to 10), higher secondary (from grades 11 to 12) and tertiary. The five years of primary education concludes with a Primary School Completion (PSC) Examination, the three years of junior education concludes with Junior School Certificate (JSC) Examination. Next, two years of secondary education concludes with a Secondary School Certificate (SSC) Examination. Students who pass this examination proceed to two years of higher secondary or intermediate training, which culminate in a Higher Secondary School Certificate (HSC) Examination. Education is mainly offered in Bengali. However, English is also widely taught and used. Many Muslim families send their children to attend part-time courses or even to pursue full-time religious education alongside other subjects, which is imparted in Bengali and Arabic in schools, colleges and madrasas.

== Places of interest ==
Nanuhar Sath Songho Horibasor Mondir

- Nanuhar Sath Songho Horibasor Mondir – located in Nanuhar, Pirganj Upazila

== See also ==
- Pirganj Upazila, Rangpur
- Thakurgaon District
- Rangpur Division
