= Manoranjan Shill Gopal =

Bangladeshi politician

- মনোরঞ্জন শীল গোপাল

Member of Parliament for Dinajpur-1
- In office 2005–2024
- Preceded by: Abdullah Al Kafi

Personal details
- Born: 1 January 1964 (age 62) Dinajpur, East Pakistan
- Education: B.A
- Profession: Business & Agriculture

Manoranjan Shill Gopal (Bengali: মনোরঞ্জন শীল গোপাল; born 1 January 1964), also known as Gopal, is a Bangladeshi politician who was a member of parliament for Dinajpur-1.

== Career ==
Gopal unsuccessfully contested Jatiyo Sangshad (National Parliament) constituency Dinajpur-1 in 1991 under the National Democratic Party banner, in June 1996 as the Jatiya Party candidate, and in 2001 as the Islami Oikya Jote candidate.

He ran as an independent in the December 2005 by-election for Dinajpur-1, and was elected member of parliament with a majority of 62,401 votes. Representing the Bangladesh Awami League, he was re-elected to the seat in the 2008 and 2014 general elections.

In September 2017, Gopal was sued by an Awami League activists for renaming Sheikh Mujibur Rahman College to MS Gopal Model College.

In September 2018, Awami League activists declared Gopal unwanted in Dinajpur District in a rally. He was re-elected from Dinajpur-1 as an Awami League candidate in December 2018.
