= Birganj Upazila =

Birganj বীরগঞ্জ
- Upazila
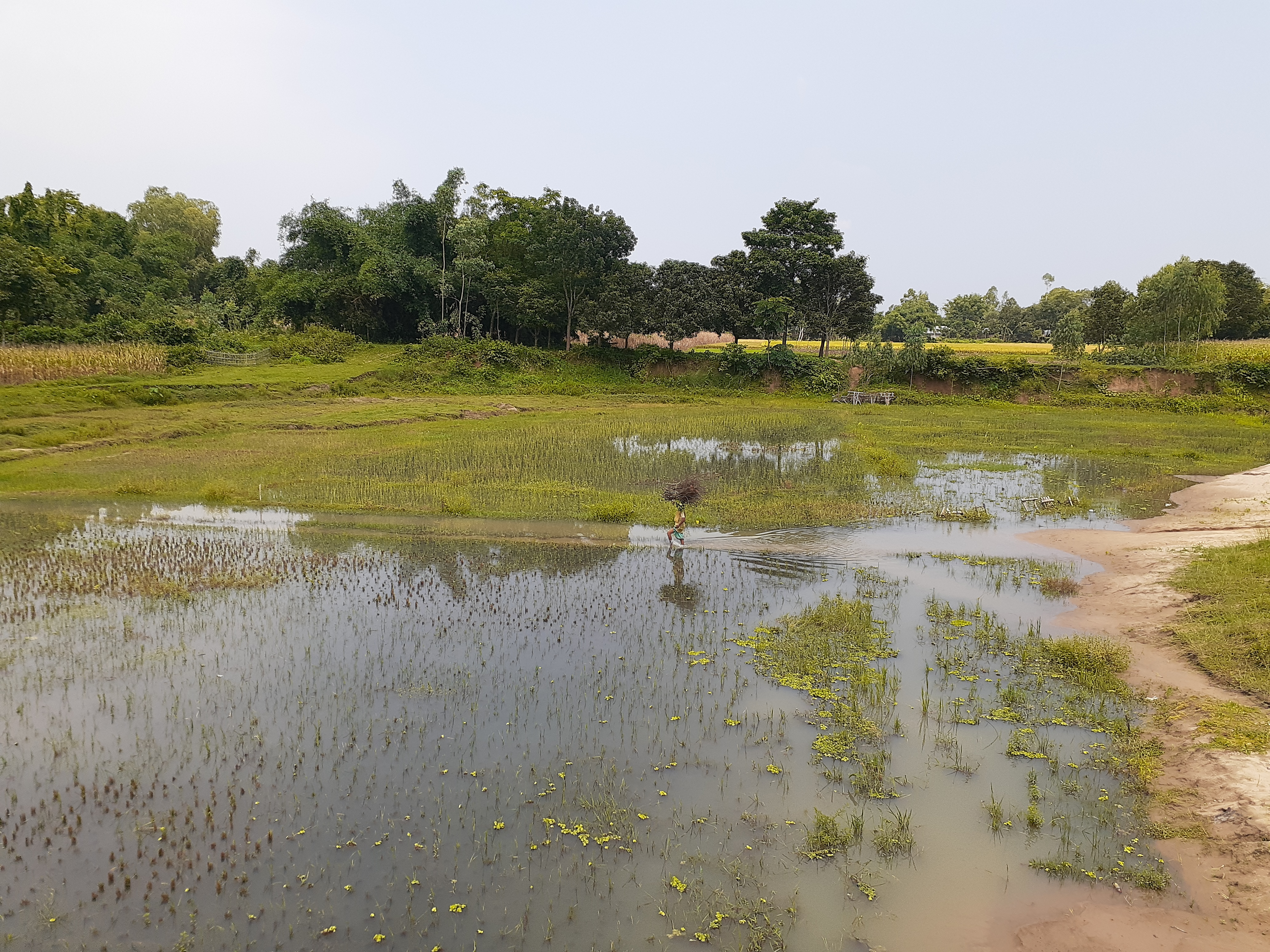
- Fields in Singra National Park

- Coordinates: 26°0′0″N 88°35′0″E
- Country: Bangladesh
- Division: Rangpur
- District: Dinajpur

Area
  - Total: 413.11 km^{2} (159.50 sq mi)

Population (2022)
  - Total: 356,152
  - Density: 862.12/km^{2} (2,232.9/sq mi)
- Time zone: UTC+6 (BST)
- Postal code: 5220
- Area code: 05323

Birganj Upazila mauza geocode map

Birganj (Bengali: বীরগঞ্জ) is an upazila of Dinajpur District in the division of Rangpur, Bangladesh.

== Geography ==
Birganj is located "between 25°48' and 26°04' north latitudes and in between 88°29´ and 88°44´ east longitudes". It is situated on the bank of Dhepa river, midway between Dinajpur and Thakurgaon. It has a total area of 413.11 km^{2}.

The upazila is bounded by Thakurgaon sadar and Debiganj upazilas on the north, Kaharole Upazila on the south, Atrai River and Khansama Upazila on the east, Bochaganj, Pirganj Upazila of Thakurgaon and Thakurgaon Sadar Upazila on the west.

== Demographics ==
According to the 2022 Bangladeshi census, Birganj Upazila had 87,824 households and a population of 356,152. 9.39% of the population were under 5 years of age. Birganj had a literacy rate (age 7 and over) of 73.21%: 76.64% for males and 69.85% for females, and a sex ratio of 98.84 males for every 100 females. 31,728 (8.91%) lived in urban areas.

According to the 2011 Census of Bangladesh, Birganj Upazila had 73,895 households and a population of 317,253. 72,798 (22.95%) were under 10 years of age. Birganj had a literacy rate (age 7 and over) of 48.05%, compared to the national average of 51.8%, and a sex ratio of 988 females per 1000 males. 19,467 (6.14%) lived in urban areas. Ethnic population was 7,362 (2.32%), of which Santal were 6,880.

As of the 1991 Bangladesh census, Birganj has a population of 231,305. Males constitute 51.77% of the population, and females 48.23%. This upazila's over-18 population is 111,160. Birganj has an average literacy rate of 25% (7+ years), compared with the national average of 32.4%.

=== Ethnicity and religion ===
Religions in Birganj Upazila (2022)
Religion	Percent
Islam	70.52%
Hinduism	27.47%
Christianity	1.54%
Other or not stated	0.47%

Population by religion in Union/Paurashava
Union/Paurashava	Muslim	Hindu	Others
Birganj Paurashava	18,649	4,336	548
Bhognagar Union	21,818	7,971	712
Maricha Union	21,521	8,384	692
Mohammadpur Union	8,598	13,481	47
Mohanpur Union	26,935	2,925	1077
Nijpara Union	24,154	8,805	995
Palashbari Union	21,097	8,254	408
Paltapur Union	27,027	4,825	634
Sator Union	21,449	5,733	688
Shatagram Union	26,265	5,733	522
Shibrampur Union	15,974	14,518	51
Sujalpur Union	17,643	8,382	902

🟩 Muslim majority 🟧 Hindu majority

Bengali Muslims are the largest community, with a relatively large Bengali Hindu community which is majority in one union. Ethnic population is 6557 (1.84%) of which Santals are 6119.

Population of upazila by ethnicity (2022)
1. Bengali (98.2%)
2. Santal (1.72%)
3. Others (0.12%)

== Administration ==
UNO: Md. Fazle Alahi.

Birganj Upazila, formed as a thana in 1890, was turned into an upazila in 1983.

The upazila is divided into Birganj Municipality and 11 union parishads namely: Bhognagar, Mohammadpur, Mohonpur, Moricha, Nijpara, Paltapur, Polashbari, Sator, Shatagram, Shibrampur, and Sujalpur. The union parishads are subdivided into 186 mauzas and 187 villages.

Birganj Municipality is subdivided into 9 wards and 11 mahallas. Birganj Town and Jharbari Bazar are some of the main marketplaces in the Upazila.

== Education ==
- Ibrahim Memorial Shikkha Niketan
- Birganj Pilot Government High School
- Birganj Government College
- Birganj Women's College
- Jharbari Dwi Mukhi High School

== Notable people ==
- Abdullah Al Kafi was the Member of Parliament for constituency Dinajpur-1 from 2001 until his death in 2005.

== See also ==
- Upazilas of Bangladesh
- Districts of Bangladesh
- Divisions of Bangladesh
- Dinajpur District, Bangladesh
