= Nafakhum Waterfall =

Waterfall in Bangladesh

Coordinates: 21.7203°N 92.5337°E

Nafa-khum (Bengali: নাফাখুম) is a waterfall in Bangladesh on the Remaikree River, a tributary of the Sangu River. It is among the largest waterfalls in the country by volume of water falling. The wild hilly Remaikree river suddenly falls down here about 25–30 feet or 7.62-9.144 meters.

The word Ngafa (ঙাফা) in native Marma language means Baghair fish/ Dwarf goonch and "Khong" means "Ground". A special type of flying fish, whose local name is nating, is found at the bottom in a small cave as they swim against the stream but cannot jump over the height of the fall.

== Location ==
The falls are located in a remote area two hours' walking distance from Remakree bazar, Thanchi Upazila, Bandarban District. In the rainy season while water level increases, navigation by boat to Ngafakhong is about 20–25 minutes journey which can be hired from Remaikree estuary. Remakree is located three hours by boat on the Sangu River from Tindu, which is itself three hours by boat from Thanchi. Nafakhum is a very popular as a tourist destination. But due to increasing number of mass touring the surrounding ecology has been deteriorated these days.

== Gallery ==
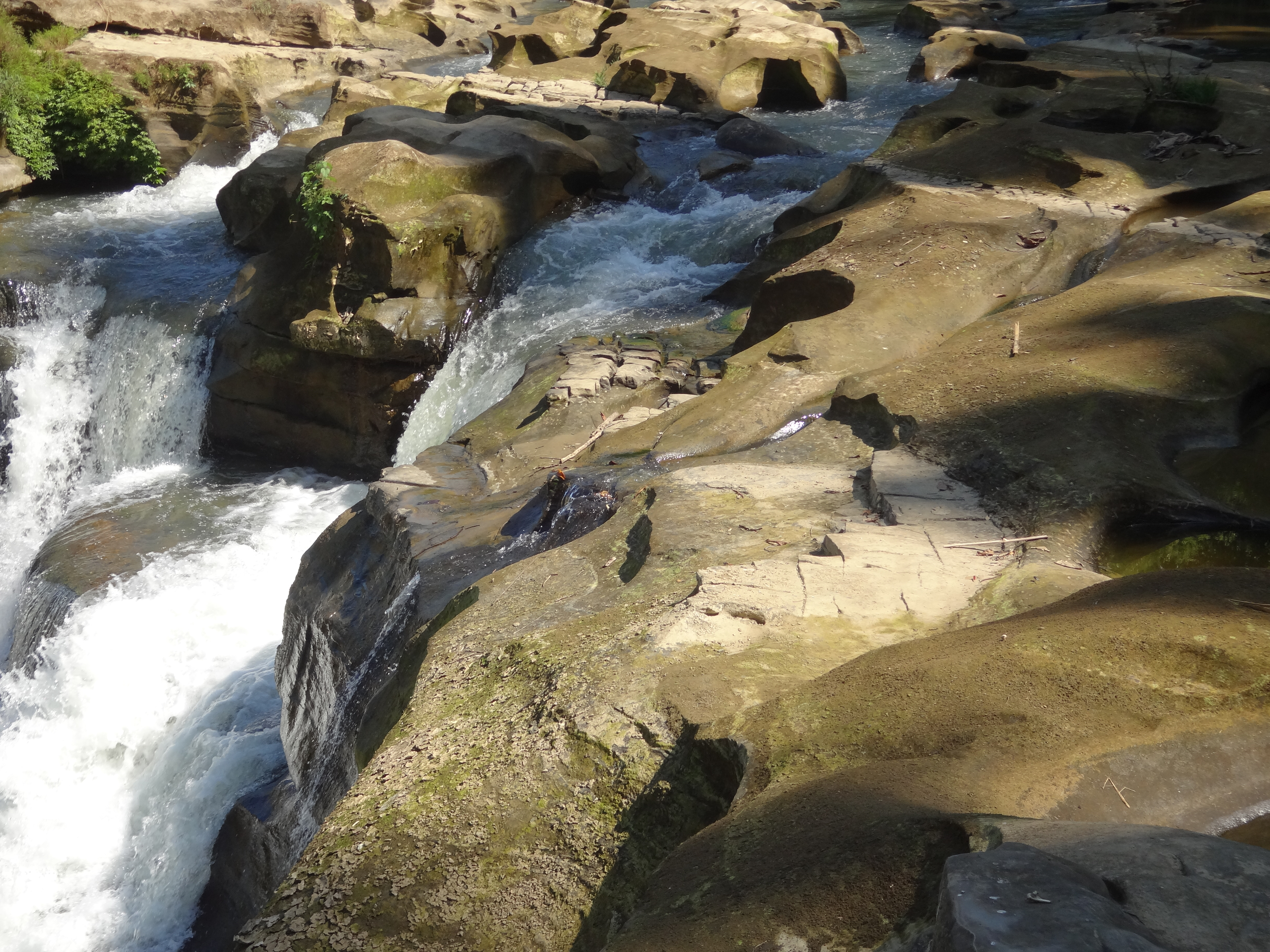
Nafa-khum waterfalls

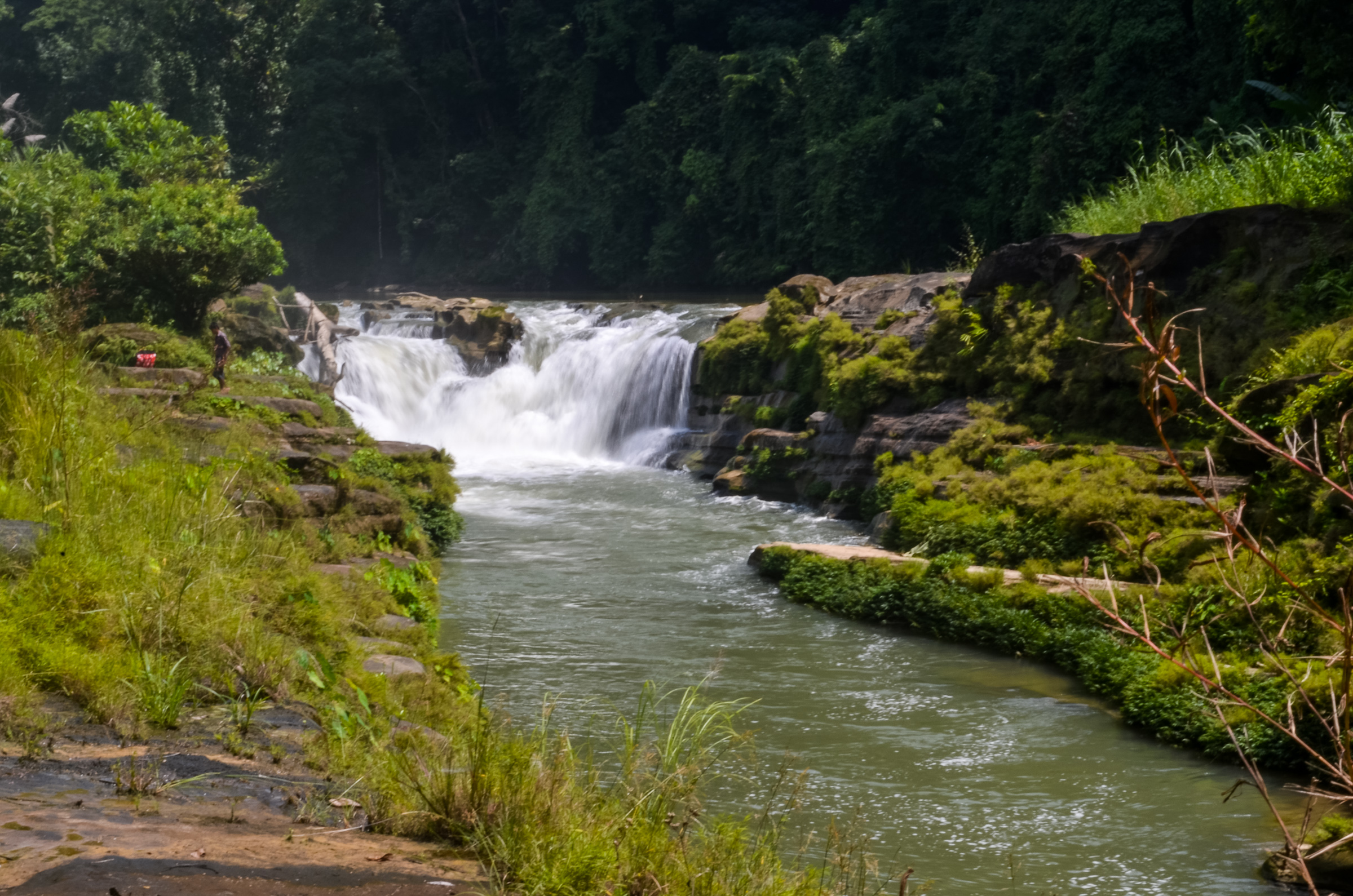
Nafa-khum waterfalls

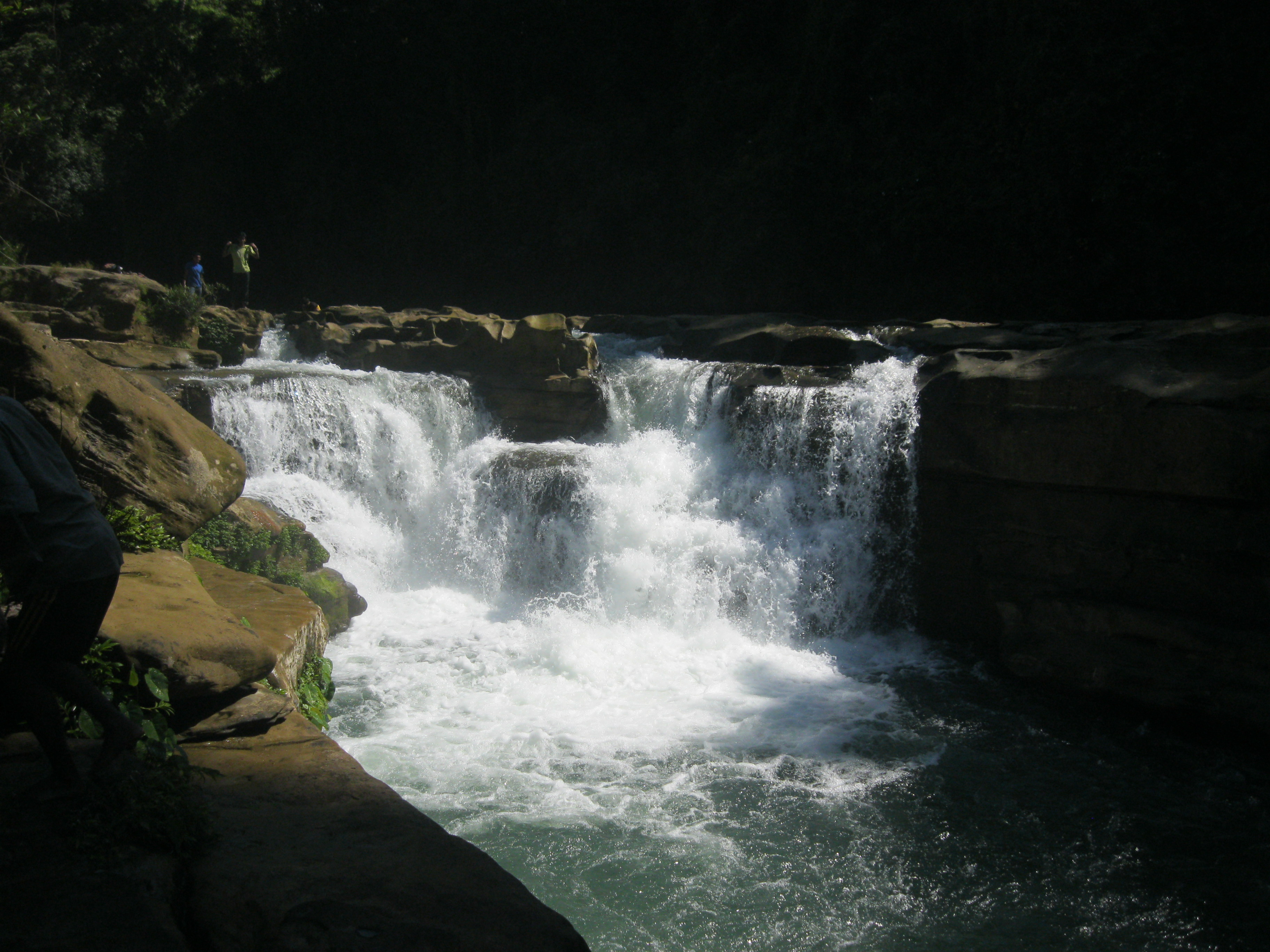
Nafa-khum waterfalls

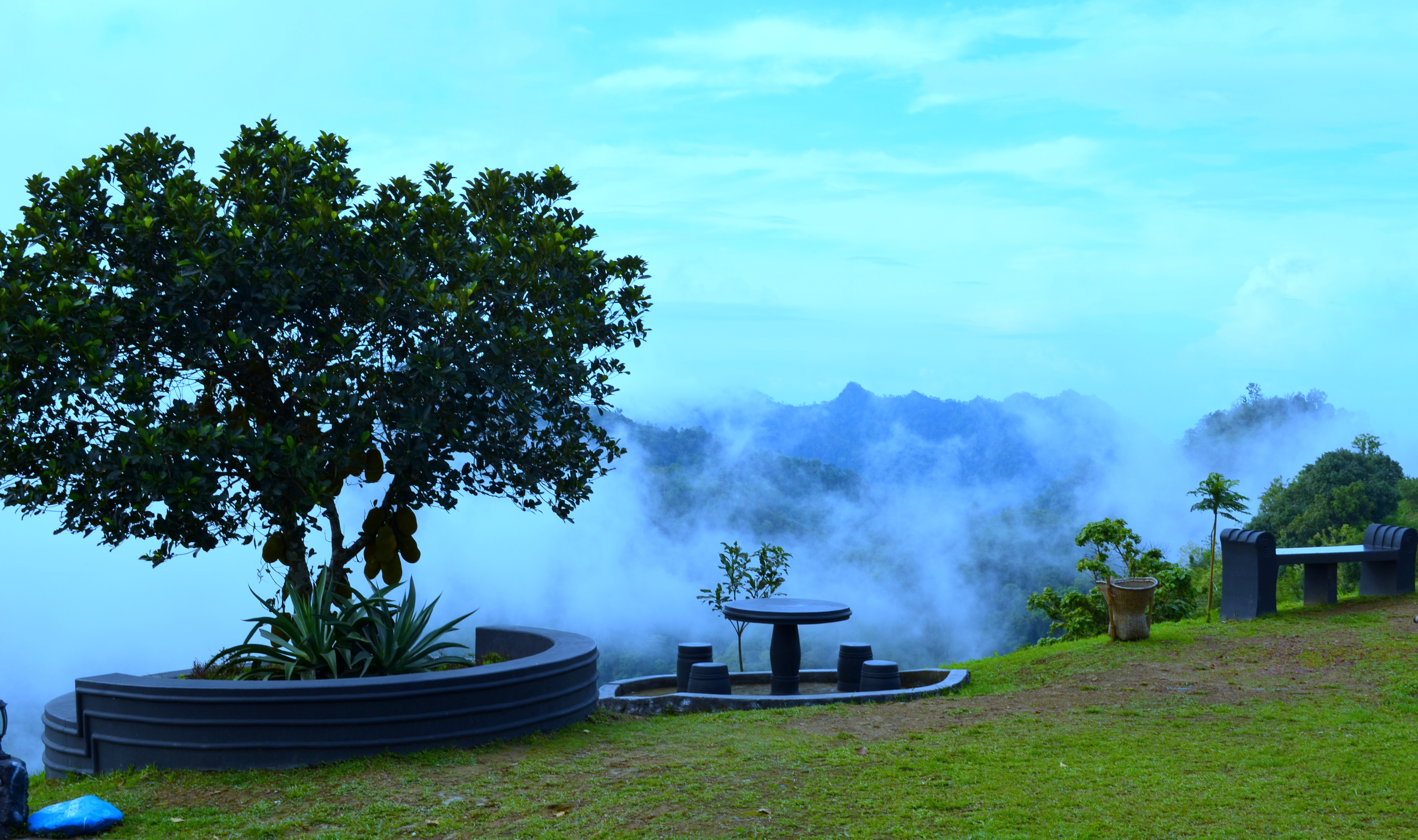
View from Nilgiri

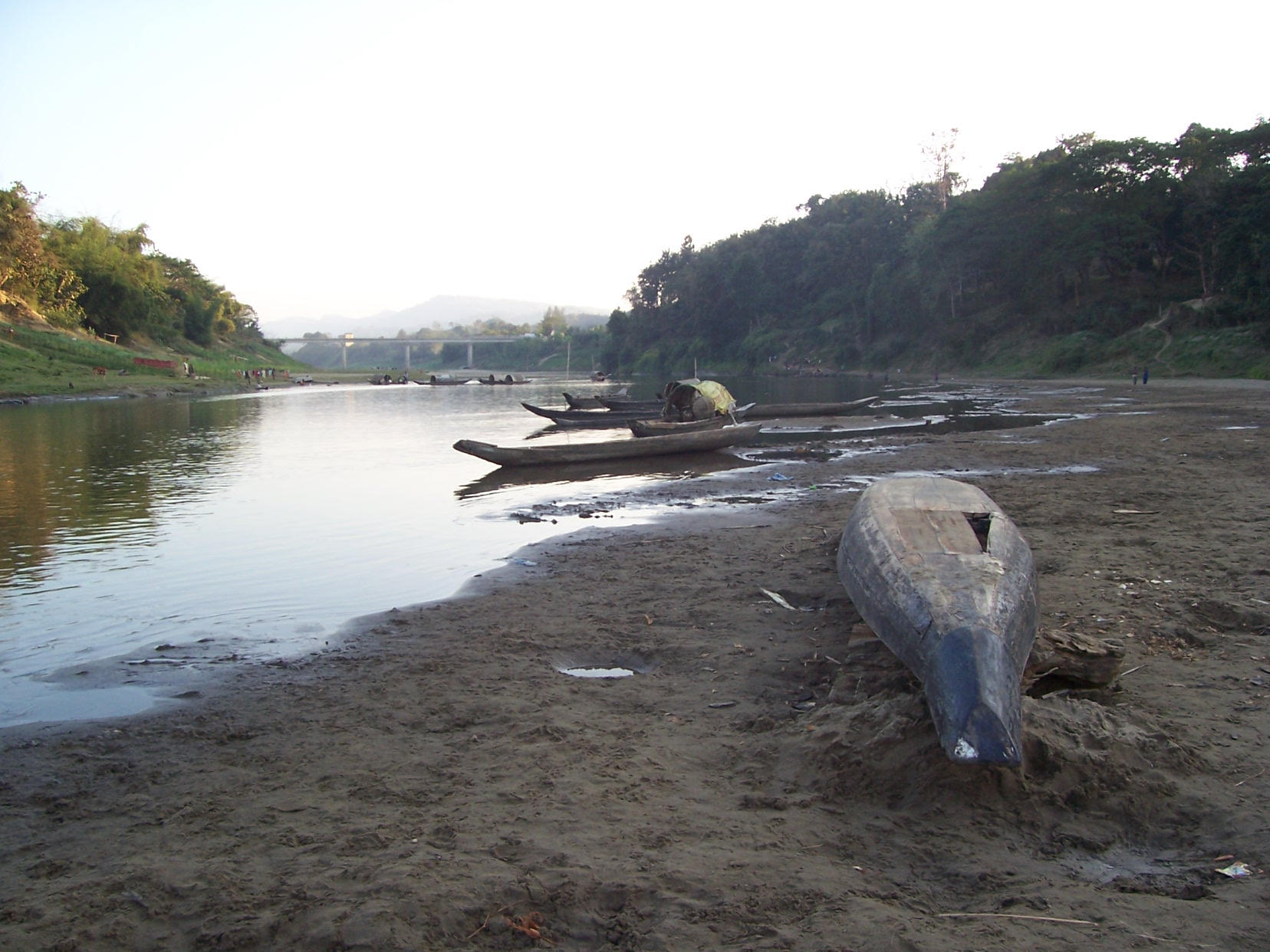
Sangu River

== See also ==
- Madhabkunda waterfall
