= Thanchi =

Thanchi may refer to:

- Thanchi Upazila, an upazila of Bandarban District
- Thanchi Union, a union of Thanchi Upazila under Bandarban District
