= Ronipara =

- Location in Bangladesh
- Coordinates: 22°9′N 92°27′E
- Country: Bangladesh
- Division: Chittagong Division
- District: Bandarban District
- Time zone: UTC+6 (Bangladesh Time)

Ronipara is a village in Ruma Upazila of Bandarban District in the Chittagong Division of southeastern Bangladesh. Its geographical location is: N22.16878° and E92.44309°. And the altitude is about 1,211 feet (369 m) from sea level.
