= Remakri =

Remakri may refer to:

- Remakri Union, a union of Thanchi Upazila
- Remakri Pransa Union, a union of Ruma Upazila
