= Ghalangya Union =

Ghalangya Union গ্যালেংগ্যা ইউনিয়ন
- Location within Bangladesh
- Coordinates: 22.0511°N 92.4088°E
- Country: Bangladesh
- Division: Chittagong Division
- District: Bandarban District
- Upazila: Ruma Upazila

Government
  - Type: Union Council
- Time zone: UTC+6 (BST)
- Website: ghalangyaup.bandarban.gov.bd

Ghalangya Union (Bengali: গ্যালেংগ্যা ইউনিয়ন) is a union parishad of Ruma Upazila in Bandarban District, Chittagong Division, Bangladesh. Its population is 2,953 men and 2,765 women, and the union's literacy rate is 16.4 per cent.

== Demographics ==
According to 2022 census, total population of ghalangya union is 6,611. 3,375 people are religiously unclassified, 1,680 are Buddhist, 1,528 are Christian, 20 are Muslim and 8 are Hindu.

Religion-2022
1. Christianity (25.4%)
2. Buddhism (23.1%)
3. Islam (0.30%)
4. Hinduism (0.12%)
5. Krama and Others (51.0%)

== Ethnicity ==
There are 32 Bengali, 4,379 Mro, 1,067 Marma, 864 Tripura and 269 others people.

Ethnicity-2022
1. Mro (66.2%)
2. Marma (16.1%)
3. Tripura (13.1%)
4. Bengalis (0.48%)
5. Others (4.07%)
