= Khumi people =

Ethnic group in Bangladesh and Myanmar

Khumi
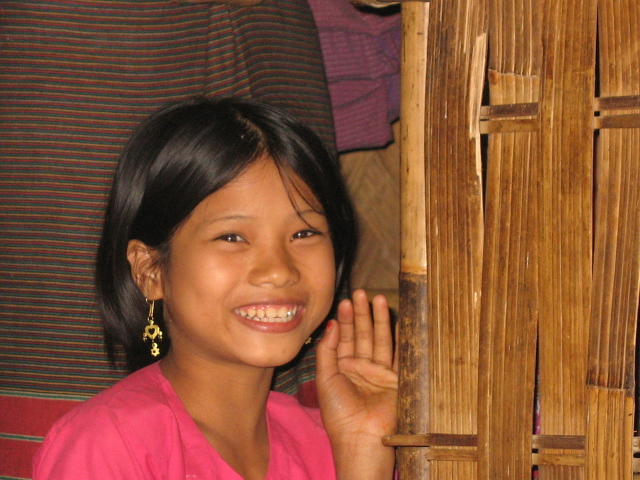

Total population
- c. 17,780

Regions with significant populations
- In Myanmar the Khumis reside in the Paletwa District of southern Chin State. In Bangladesh they reside in Bandarban District of the Chittagong Hill Tracts.
- Myanmar: 14,000 (2024)
- Bangladesh: 3,780 (2022)

Languages
- Khumi language

Religion
- Christianity; Buddhism; indigenous religion

The Khumis are an ethnic group inhabiting the Rakhine and Chin State of Myanmar and the Chittagong Hill Tracts of Bangladesh. They have a population of around 14,000 across western Myanmar. The Khumis are one of smallest ethnic groups in Bangladesh with a population of only 1,214 according to the 1991 census (in the census of 1981 their population was recorded as 1,258).

== History ==
Among the ethnic groups in Chittagong Hill Tracts the Khumis were the war like people. Earlier they were very often engaged in internecine or intertrinal warfare with the Bawms and the Mros. The Khumis originally lived in Arakan; however, after a fierce battle between them and the Mro, the latter were defeated and fled to the Chittagong Hill Tracts. But later the Khumis themselves entered Chittagong Hill Tracts after being defeated by Arakan.

The term "Khumi" might have originated from a combination of two words in the Khumi language: "Kha," meaning "man," and "Ma," meaning "the best race." Together, they signify "the man who excels in racing." But according to the Arakanese language, "Kha" translates to "dog," and "Ma" refers to "race," which interprets as "the dog that races best."

During the East Pakistan period, a large number of Khumis migrated to Myanmar.

== Geographical distribution ==
According to the 2022 Bangladeshi census, there are 3,780 Khumi in Bangladesh. They mainly concentrated in Bandarban District with a population of 3,287. Some also live in Rangamati District.

Upazila/States	Population	Percentage who are Khumi
Thanchi Upazila	1,829	6.14%
Ruma Upazila	890	2.74%
Rowangchhari Upazila	436	1.57%
Chin State	14,000	c. 2.86%
Other (Diaspora)	>1,000	N/A

== Persecution ==
The Khumis have faced discrimination within Bangladesh and Myanmar. The Arakan Army imposed the Rakhine language in schools with children that originally speak the Khumi language. They have also been subjected to forced labour and conscription.

== Religion and culture ==
The Khumis are primarily Christian with a minority Buddhist and animist population. Historically, the Khumis were animist until the 1930s, following British missionary work. The men keep long hair and tie it into a tuft on the head. They are dependent on shifting cultivation. In 1995, only one of their members passed Secondary School Certificate examination.
