= Tankabati Union =

Union of Bandarban District, Chittagong, Bangladesh

Tankabati টংকাবতী
- Union
- Interactive map of Tankabati
- Country: Bangladesh
- Division: Chittagong Division
- District: Bandarban District
- Upazila: Bandarban Sadar Upazila

Area
  - Total: 152.67 km^{2} (58.95 sq mi)

Population (2022)
  - Total: 6,672
  - Density: 43.70/km^{2} (113.2/sq mi)
- Time zone: UTC+6 (BST)
- Postal code: 4600
- Website: tongkabotyup.bandarban.gov.bd

Tankabati/Tongkaboty Union is a union of Bandarban Sadar Upazila under Bandarban District.

== Demography ==
According to 2022 census, total population of the Union are 6,672. Among them, 1,142 are Muslim, 1,674 are Christian, 884 are Buddhist, 49 are Hindu and 2,923 are others.

Religion-2022
1. Christianity (25.1%)
2. Islam (17.1%)
3. Buddhism (13.2%)
4. Hinduism (0.73%)
5. Krama and Others (43.8%)

== Ethnicity ==
This Union is home to a variety of different ethnic groups. Among them, 1,615 are Bengali, 4,744 are Mru, 160 are Tripura, 10 are Marma and 2,904 are of others ethnic groups.

Ethnicity-2022
1. Mru (71.1%)
2. Bengali (24.2%)
3. Tripura (2.40%)
4. Marma (0.15%)
5. Others (2.14%)
