= Rowangchhari =

Rowangchhari may refer to:

- Rowangchhari Upazila, an upazila of Bandarban District
- Rowangchhari Union, a union of Rowangchhari Upazila under Bandarban District
