= Remakri Pransa Union =

Remakri Pransa Union রেমাক্রীপ্রাংসা ইউনিয়ন
- Location within Bangladesh
- Coordinates: 21.6768°N 92.5212°E
- Country: Bangladesh
- Division: Chittagong Division
- District: Bandarban District
- Upazila: Ruma Upazila

Government
  - Type: Union Council
- Time zone: UTC+6 (BST)

Remakri Pransa Union (Bengali: রেমাক্রীপ্রাংসা ইউনিয়ন) is a union parishad of Ruma Upazila in Bandarban District, Chittagong Division, Bangladesh. Its population is 2,615 men and 2,545 women, and the union's literacy rate is 25.6 per cent.

== Demographics ==
According to 2022 census, total population of Remakri Pransa union is 5319. Among them, 3,882 are Christian, 117 are Buddhist, 60 are Muslim, 12 are Hindu and 1,248 are unclassified.

Religion-2022
1. Christianity (73.0%)
2. Buddhism (2.20%)
3. Islam (1.13%)
4. Hinduism (0.23%)
5. Krama and Others (23.5%)

== Ethnicity ==
There are 476 Bengali, 1,359 Mro, 1,215 Tripura , 24 Marma and 2,245 others people.

Ethnicity-2022
1. Mro (25.6%)
2. Tripura (22.8%)
3. Bengalis (8.95%)
4. Marma (0.45%)
5. Bom and Others (42.2%)
