= Nayapara =

Nayapara may refer to:

- Nayapara refugee camp , a Rohingya refugee camp in Teknaf Upazila, Cox's Bazar District, Chittagong Division, Bangladesh
- Nayapara Union, a union of Alikadam Upazila in Bandarban District, Bangladesh
