= Kurukpata Union =

Union of Bandarban District, Chittagong, Bangladesh

Kurukpata কুরুকপাতা
- Union
- Interactive map of Kurukpata
- Country: Bangladesh
- Division: Chittagong Division
- District: Bandarban District
- Upazila: Alikadam Upazila

Area
  - Total: 702.05 km^{2} (271.06 sq mi)

Population (2022)
  - Total: 11,216
  - Density: 15.976/km^{2} (41.378/sq mi)
- Time zone: UTC+6 (BST)
- Postal code: 4650

Kurukpata Union is a union of Alikadam Upazila under Bandarban District.

== Demography ==
According to 2022 census, total population of the Union are 11,216 . Among them, 7,492 are Buddhist, 1,531 are Christian, 243 are Muslim, 12 are Hindu and 1,938 are others.

Religion-2022
1. Buddhism (66.8%)
2. Christianity (13.7%)
3. Islam (2.17%)
4. Hinduism (0.10%)
5. Krama and Others (17.3%)

== Ethnicity ==
This Union is home to a variety of different ethnic groups. Among them, 301 are Bengali, 8,906 are Mru, 1,277 are Tripura, 83 are Marma and 649 are of others ethnic groups.

Ethnicity-2022
1. Mru (79.4%)
2. Tripura (11.4%)
3. Bengali (2.68%)
4. Marma (0.74%)
5. Others (5.89%)
