= Aaartali =

- Village
- Location in Bangladesh
- Coordinates: 21°38′N 92°22′E
- Country: Bangladesh
- Division: Chittagong Division
- District: Bandarban District
- Time zone: UTC+6 (Bangladesh Time)

Aaartali is a lightly populated village in Bandarban, Chittagong, Bangladesh. The closest major city is Cox's Bazar and can be reached from Naikhongchari village, Naikhongchari Upazila. The village lies close to the border with Myanmar. The main religious center is Ashartali Jame Mosque, located in the village, and the Ashartali Government Primary School is located here.

== See also ==
- Paglirpara
