= Balipara Union =

Union of Bandarban District, Chittagong, Bangladesh

Balipara বলিপাড়া
- Union
- Interactive map of Balipara
- Country: Bangladesh
- Division: Chittagong Division
- District: Bandarban District
- Upazila: Thanchi Upazila

Area
  - Total: 84 km^{2} (32 sq mi)

Population (2022)
  - Total: 6,497
  - Density: 77/km^{2} (200/sq mi)
- Time zone: UTC+6 (BST)
- Postal code: 4630
- Website: baliparaup.bandarban.gov.bd

Balipara Union is a union of Thanchi Upazila under Bandarban District.

== Demography ==
According to 2022 census, total population of the Union are 6,497 . Among them, 3,783 are Buddhist, 1,541 are Christian, 810 are Muslim, 244 are Hindu and 119 are others.

Religion-2022
1. Buddhism (58.2%)
2. Christianity (23.7%)
3. Islam (12.5%)
4. Hinduism (3.75%)
5. Others (1.83%)

== Ethnicity ==
This Union is home to a variety of different ethnic groups. Among them, 1,183 are Bengali, 2,991 are Marma, 1,182 are Tripura 1and 682 are of others ethnic groups.

Ethnicity-2022
1. Marma (46.0%)
2. Bengali (18.2%)
3. Tripura (18.2%)
4. Mru (7.06%)
5. Others (10.5%)
