= Nayapara Union =

Union of Bandarban District, Chittagong, Bangladesh

Nayapara নয়াপাড়া
- Union
- Interactive map of Nayapara
- Country: Bangladesh
- Division: Chittagong Division
- District: Bandarban District
- Upazila: Alikadam Upazila

Area
  - Total: 30.92 km^{2} (11.94 sq mi)

Population (2022)
  - Total: 10,973
  - Density: 354.9/km^{2} (919.1/sq mi)
- Time zone: UTC+6 (BST)
- Postal code: 4650

Nayapara Union is a union of Alikadam Upazila under Bandarban District.

== Demography ==
According to 2022 census, total population of the Union are 10,973 . Among them, 6,527 are Muslim, 3,541 are Buddhist, 456 are Hindu, 43 are Christian and 406 are others.

Religion-2022
1. Islam (59.5%)
2. Buddhism (32.3%)
3. Hinduism (4.16%)
4. Christianity (0.39%)
5. Krama and Others (3.70%)

== Ethnicity ==
This Union is home to a variety of different ethnic groups. Among them, 7,021 are Bengali, 1,639 are Mru, 1,415 are Marma and 897 are of others ethnic groups.

Ethnicity-2022
1. Bengali (64.0%)
2. Mru (14.9%)
3. Marma (12.9%)
4. Others (8.18%)
