= Rowangchhari Union =

Union of Bandarban District, Chittagong, Bangladesh

Rowangchhari Sadar রোয়াংছড়ি সদর
- Union
- Interactive map of Rowangchhari Sadar
- Country: Bangladesh
- Division: Chittagong Division
- District: Bandarban District
- Upazila: Rowangchhari Upazila

Area
  - Total: 121.91 km^{2} (47.07 sq mi)

Population (2022)
  - Total: 8,685
  - Density: 71.24/km^{2} (184.5/sq mi)
- Time zone: UTC+6 (BST)
- Postal code: 4610
- Website: rowangcharisadarup.bandarban.gov.bd

Rowangchhari Sadar Union is a union of Rowangchhari Upazila under Bandarban District.

== Demography ==
According to 2022 census, total population of the Union are 8,685. Among them, 2,305 are Christian, 5,859 are Buddhist, 426 are Muslim, 94 are Hindu and 1 are others.

Religion-2022
1. Buddhism (67.5%)
2. Christianity (26.5%)
3. Islam (4.91%)
4. Hinduism (1.08%)
5. Others (0.01%)

== Ethnicity ==
This Union is home to a variety of different ethnic groups. Among them, 810 are Bengali, 4,195 are Marma, 402 are Tripura and 3,278 are of others ethnic groups.

Ethnicity-2022
1. Marma (48.3%)
2. Bengali (9.33%)
3. Tripura (4.63%)
4. Bom and Others (37.7%)
