= Chaikkhyong Union =

Union of Bandarban District, Chittagong, Bangladesh

Chwekhyong চৈক্ষ্যং
- Union
- Interactive map of Chwekhyong
- Country: Bangladesh
- Division: Chittagong Division
- District: Bandarban District
- Upazila: Alikadam Upazila

Area
  - Total: 129.5 km^{2} (50.0 sq mi)

Population (2022)
  - Total: 18,123
  - Density: 139.9/km^{2} (362.5/sq mi)
- Time zone: UTC+6 (BST)
- Postal code: 4650
- Website: chwekhyongup.bandarban.gov.bd

Chaikkhyong/Chwekhyong Union is a union of Alikadam Upazila under Bandarban District.

== Demography ==
According to 2022 census, total population of the Union are 18,122 . Among them, 11,732 are Muslim, 5,017 are Buddhist, 1,049 are Christian, 308 are Hindu and 17 are others.

Religion-2022
1. Islam (64.7%)
2. Buddhism (27.7%)
3. Christianity (5.79%)
4. Hinduism (1.70%)
5. Others (0.09%)

== Ethnicity ==
This Union is home to a variety of different ethnic groups. Among them, 13,203 are Bengali, 2,150 are Mru, 1,735 are Marma, 770 are Tripura and 264 are of others ethnic groups.

Ethnicity-2022
1. Bengali (72.9%)
2. Mru (11.9%)
3. Marma (9.57%)
4. Tripura (4.25%)
5. Others (1.46%)
