= Tindu Union =

Union of Bandarban District, Chittagong, Bangladesh

Tindu তিন্দু
- Union
- Interactive map of Tindu
- Country: Bangladesh
- Division: Chittagong Division
- District: Bandarban District
- Upazila: Thanchi Upazila

Area
  - Total: 455.84 km^{2} (176.00 sq mi)

Population (2022)
  - Total: 5,310
  - Density: 11.6/km^{2} (30.2/sq mi)
- Time zone: UTC+6 (BST)
- Postal code: 4630
- Website: tinduup.bandarban.gov.bd

Tindu Union is a union of Thanchi Upazila under Bandarban District.

== Demography ==
According to 2022 census, total population of the Union are 5,310. Among them, 3,139 are Christian, 1,470 are Buddhist, 89 are Muslim, 2 are Hindu and 610 are others.

Religion-2022
1. Christianity (59.1%)
2. Buddhism (27.7%)
3. Islam (1.68%)
4. Hinduism (0.04%)
5. Krama and Others (11.5%)

== Ethnicity ==
This Union is home to a variety of different ethnic groups. Among them, 100 are Bengali, 1,630 are Tripura, 1,254 are Mru, 1,161 are Marma and 1,165 are of others ethnic groups.

Ethnicity-2022
1. Tripura (30.7%)
2. Mru (23.6%)
3. Marma (21.9%)
4. Bengali (1.88%)
5. Others (21.9%)
