= Alekkhyong Union =

Union of Bandarban District, Chittagong, Bangladesh

Alekyong আলেক্ষ্যং
- Union
- Interactive map of Alekyong
- Country: Bangladesh
- Division: Chittagong Division
- District: Bandarban District
- Upazila: Rowangchhari Upazila

Area
  - Total: 113.96 km^{2} (44.00 sq mi)

Population (2022)
  - Total: 6,011
  - Density: 52.75/km^{2} (136.6/sq mi)
- Time zone: UTC+6 (BST)
- Postal code: 4610
- Website: alekyongup.bandarban.gov.bd

Alekyong Union is a union of Rowangchhari Upazila under Bandarban District.

== Demography ==
According to 2022 census, total population of the Union are 6,020. Among them, 371 are Muslim, 4,558 are Buddhist, 1,006 are Christian, 75 are Hindu and 1,653 are others.

Religion-2022
1. Buddhism (75.8%)
2. Christianity (16.7%)
3. Islam (6.17%)
4. Hinduism (1.25%)
5. Others (0.00%)

== Ethnicity ==
This Union is home to a variety of different ethnic groups. Among them, 607 are Bengali, 2,387 are Marma, 764 are Tripura and 2,252 are of others ethnic groups.

Ethnicity-2022
1. Marma (39.7%)
2. Tripura (12.7%)
3. Bengali (10.1%)
4. Others (37.5%)
