= Paindu Union =

Paindu Union পাইন্দু ইউনিয়ন
- Location within Bangladesh
- Country: Bangladesh
- Division: Chittagong Division
- District: Bandarban District
- Upazila: Ruma Upazila

Government
  - Type: Union Council
- Time zone: UTC+6 (BST)
- Website: painduup.bandarban.gov.bd

Paindu Union (Bengali: পাইন্দু ইউনিয়ন) is a Union of Ruma Upazila in Bandarban District, Chittagong Division, Bangladesh. Its population is 2,965 men and 2,838 women, and the Union's literacy rate is 21 per cent.

== Demographics ==
According to 2022 census, total population of Paindu union is 5,968. Among them, 3,842 are Buddhist, 2,050 are Christian, 74 are Muslim and 2 are Hindu.

Religion-2022
1. Buddhism (64.4%)
2. Christianity (34.4%)
3. Islam (1.24%)
4. Hinduism (0.03%)
5. Others (0.00%)

== Ethnicity ==
There are 136 Bengali, 3,564 Marma and 2,268 others people.

জাতিসত্তা-২০২২
1. Marma (59.7%)
2. Bengalis (2.28%)
3. Others (38.0%)
