= Tarachha Union =

Union of Bandarban District, Chittagong, Bangladesh

Taracha তারাছা
- Union
- Interactive map of Taracha
- Country: Bangladesh
- Division: Chittagong Division
- District: Bandarban District
- Upazila: Rowangchhari Upazila

Area
  - Total: 129.5 km^{2} (50.0 sq mi)

Population (2022)
  - Total: 8,471
  - Density: 65.41/km^{2} (169.4/sq mi)
- Time zone: UTC+6 (BST)
- Postal code: 4610
- Website: tarachaup.bandarban.gov.bd

Taracha Union is a union of Rowangchhari Upazila under Bandarban District.

== Demography ==
According to 2022 census, total population of the Union are 8,470. Among them, 1,301 are Muslim, 4,629 are Buddhist, 856 are Christian, 31 are Hindu and 1,653 are others.

Religion-2022
1. Buddhism (54.6%)
2. Islam (15.4%)
3. Christianity (10.1%)
4. Hinduism (0.37%)
5. Others (19.5%)

== Ethnicity ==
This Union is home to a variety of different ethnic groups. Among them, 1,388 are Bengali, 4,489 are Marma, 1,683 are Mru, 457 are Tripura and 453 are of others ethnic groups.

Ethnicity-2022
1. Marma (53.0%)
2. Mru (19.9%)
3. Bengali (16.4%)
4. Tripura (5.39%)
5. Others (5.35%)
