= Ruma Sadar Union =

Ruma Sadar রুমা সদর
- Location within Bangladesh
- Coordinates: 22.0498°N 92.4090°E
- Country: Bangladesh
- Division: Chittagong Division
- District: Bandarban District
- Upazila: Ruma Upazila

Government
  - Type: Union Council
- Time zone: UTC+6 (BST)
- Website: rumasadarup.bandarban.gov.bd

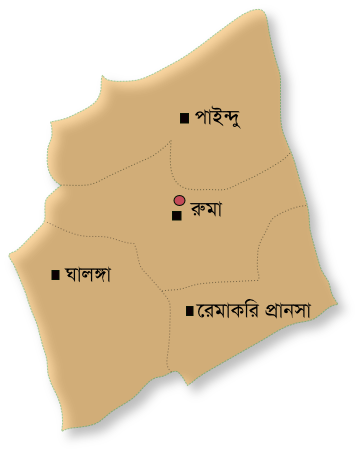
Ruma Upazila

Ruma Sadar Union (Bengali: রুমা সদর ইউনিয়ন) is a union parishad of Ruma Upazila in Bandarban District, Chittagong Division, Bangladesh. Its population is 6,936 men and 5,481 women, and the union's literacy rate is 38.8 per cent.

== Demographics ==
According to 2022 census, total population of ghalangya union is 14,635. Among them, 6,484 are Christian, 4,530 are Buddhist, 2,247 are Muslim, 534 are Hindu and 840 people are religiously unclassified.

Religion-2022
1. Buddhism (44.3%)
2. Christianity (30.9%)
3. Islam (15.3%)
4. Hinduism (3.65%)
5. Others (5.74%)

== Ethnicity ==
There are 3,591 Bengali, 5,442 Marma, 1,419 Mro, 834 Tripura and 3,349 others people.

Ethnicity-2022
1. Marma (37.2%)
2. Bengalis (24.5%)
3. Mro (9.70%)
4. Tripura (5.70%)
5. Others (22.9%)
