= Amiakhum Waterfall =

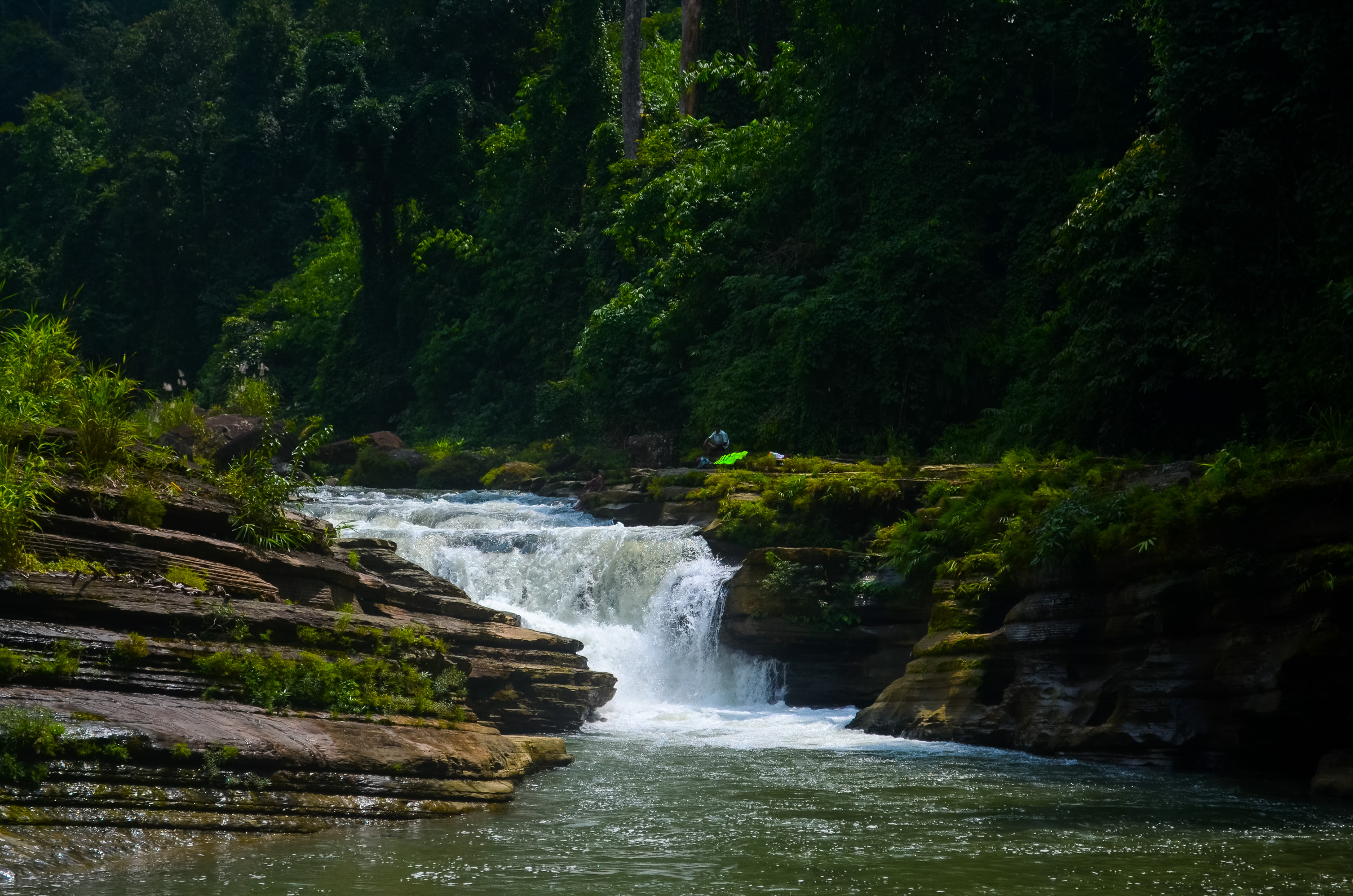
- Interactive map of Amiakhum Waterfall
- Location: Thanchi, Bandarban, Bangladesh
- Type: Hill waterfall

Amiakhum is a waterfall situated in the remote Nakshiyang area of Thanchi Upazila in Bandarban, Bangladesh. In the Marma language, khum means waterfall. The hilly Sangu River has created numerous small waterfalls along its course, among which Amiakhum is notable. A khum refers to a place where water never completely dries up. The stream of a waterfall may dry up, but a khum never does.

== Travel ==
Amiakhum is considered one of the most remote places in Bangladesh. It is 79 km away from Bandarban town, and can be reached through Thanchi. From Thanchi, there are two routes to reach Amiakhum:

Route one: Thanchi → Remakri → Padmajhiri → Thuisapara → Debotakhum Hill → Amiakhum

Route two: Thanchi → Remakri → Nafakhum → Thuisapara → Debotakhum Hill → Amiakhum

In the first route, trekking from Padmajhiri takes about 6–7 hours, sometimes even at night.

In the second route, one can take a boat from Remakri and then trek for about 2 hours to reach Thuisapara.
