= Ali Kadam Upazila =

Alikadam আলিকদম Alohkyadong
- Upazila
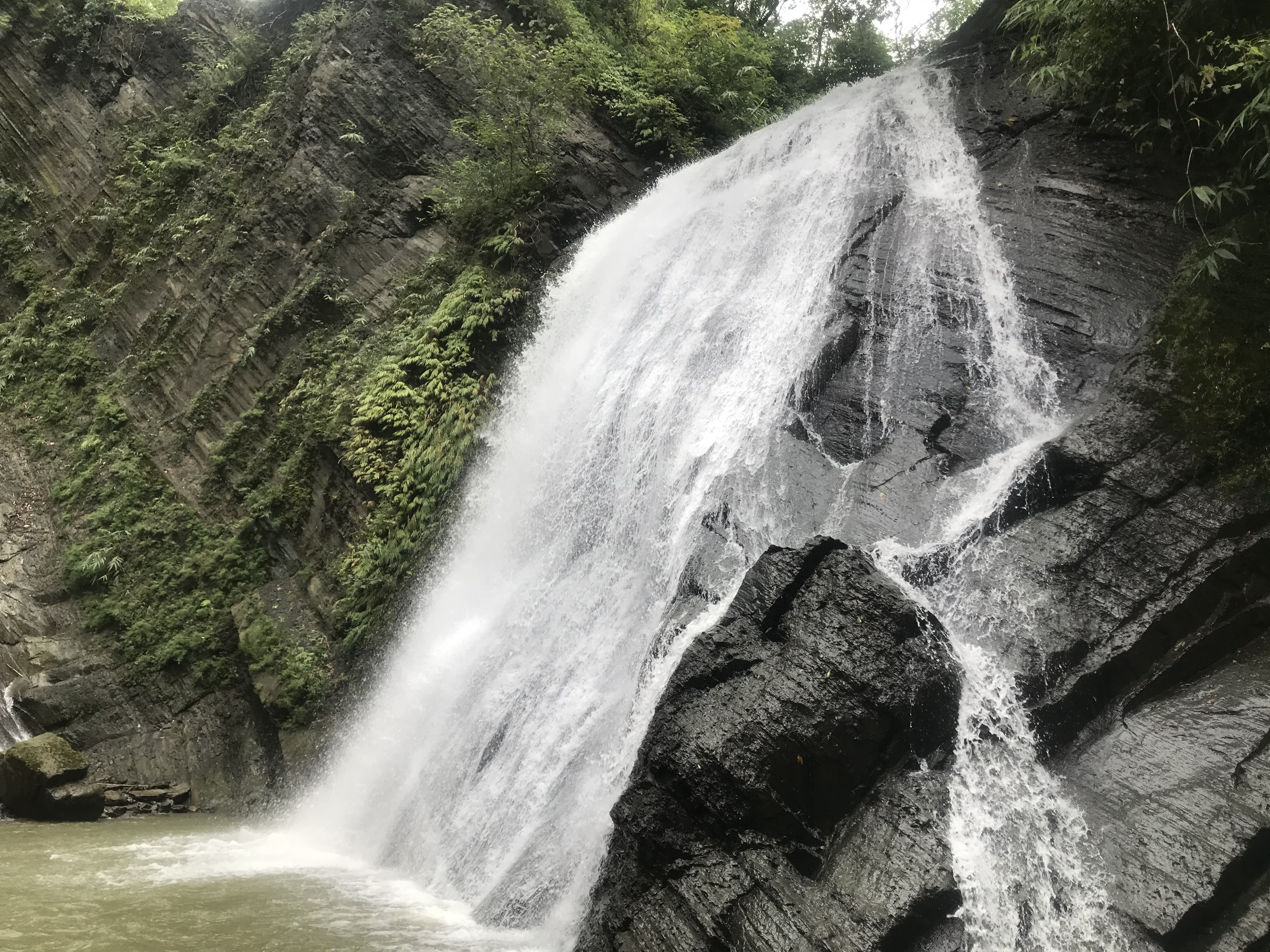
- Damtua Waterfall

- Coordinates: 21°40′N 92°18.3′E
- Country: Bangladesh
- Division: Chittagong
- District: Bandarban

Government
  - Upzilla Chairman: Abul Kalam
  - Upazila Nirbahi Officer & Executive Magistrate: Md. Sayed Iqbal

Area
  - Total: 885.77 km^{2} (342.00 sq mi)

Population (2022)
  - Total: 63,800
  - Density: 72.0/km^{2} (187/sq mi)
- Time zone: UTC+6 (BST)
- Postal code: 4650
- Website: www.alikadam.bandarban.gov.bd

Alikadam Upazila mauza geocode map

Alikadam (Bengali: আলিকদম) is an upazila of Bandarban District in Chattogram Division, Bangladesh.

== Geography ==
Ali Kadam is located at 21.6667°N 92.3056°E. It has a total area of 885.77 km^{2}. It is bordered by Lama upazila to the north, Thanchi upazila to the east, Rakhine State of Myanmar to the south and Naikhongchhari upazila to the west.

At the boundary with Thanchi Upazila, the 35-kilometre-long (22 mi) Alikadam-Thanchi Road ascends hill Dim Pahar, making it one of the highest motorable roads in Bangladesh.

== Demographics ==
According to the 2022 Bangladeshi census, Alikadam Upazila had 12,700 households and a population of 63,800. 12.28% of the population were under 5 years of age. Alikadam had a literacy rate (age 7 and over) of 57.14%: 63.01% for males and 50.69% for females, and a sex ratio of 109.29 males for every 100 females. 21,576 (33.82%) lived in urban areas.

=== Ethnicity and religion ===
Religions in Alikadam Upazila (2022)
Religion	Percent
Islam	54.71%
Buddhism	30.54%
Christianity	6.51%
Hinduism	3.03%
Other or not stated	5.20%

Population by religion in Union
Uniom	Muslim	Buddhist	Christian	Hindu	Others
Alikadam	16,405	3,436	1,530	616	959
Chwekhyong	11,732	5,016	1,049	152	17
Kurukpata	243	7,492	1,531	12	1,938
Nayapara	6,527	3,541	43	456	406

🟩 Muslim majority 🟨 Buddhist majority

As of the 2022 Bangladeshi census, Alikadam upazila had a population of 63,800. The ethnic population was 25,113 (39.36%), of which Mru were 15,168, Marma 3,857, Tripura 3,452 and Tanchangya 1,977.

Ethnicity in Alikadam Upazila (2022)
1. Bengali (60.6%)
2. Mro (23.8%)
3. Marma (6.05%)
4. Tripura (5.41%)
5. Tanchangya (3.10%)
6. Chakma (0.90%)
7. Others (0.13%)

Population by ethnicity in Union
Union	Bengali	Mro	Marma	Tripura	Others
Alikadam	18,161	2,473	623	1,370	861
Chwekhyong	13,203	2,150	1,735	770	264
Kurukpata	301	8,906	73	1,277	649
Nayapara	7,021	1,639	1,416	35	862

🟩 Bengali majority 🟫 Mro majority

== Points of interest ==
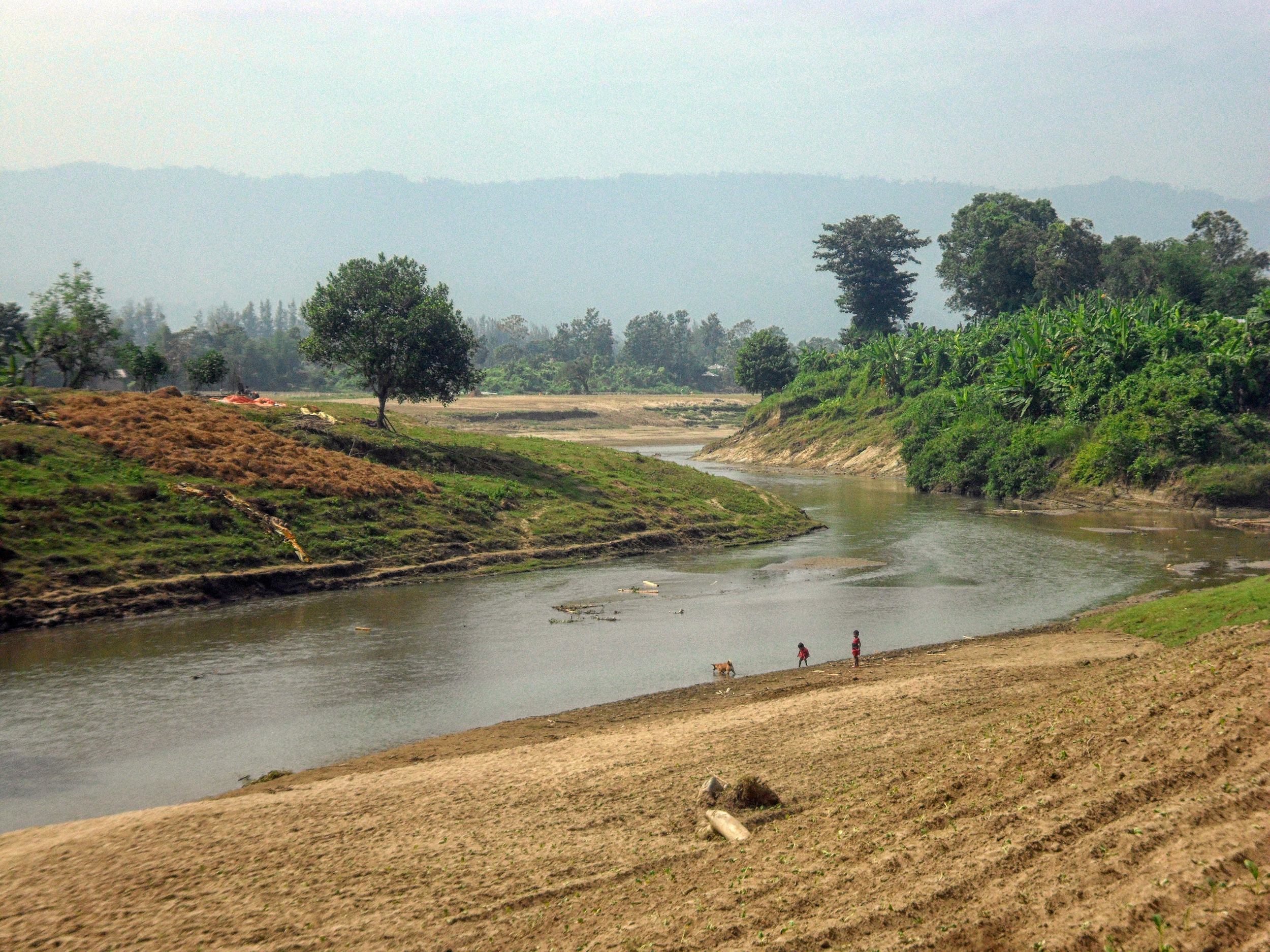
View of Ali Kadam upaliza near Ali's Tunnel

Alikadam is a popular hiking destination among tourists for the tunnels in the mountains known as "Alir Guha" or "Ali's Tunnels". Tourists are expected to face slippery and muddy terrains for the hike to the tunnels. Winter is the safest season to travel because the mountain streams and rivers are dangerous during Monsoon.

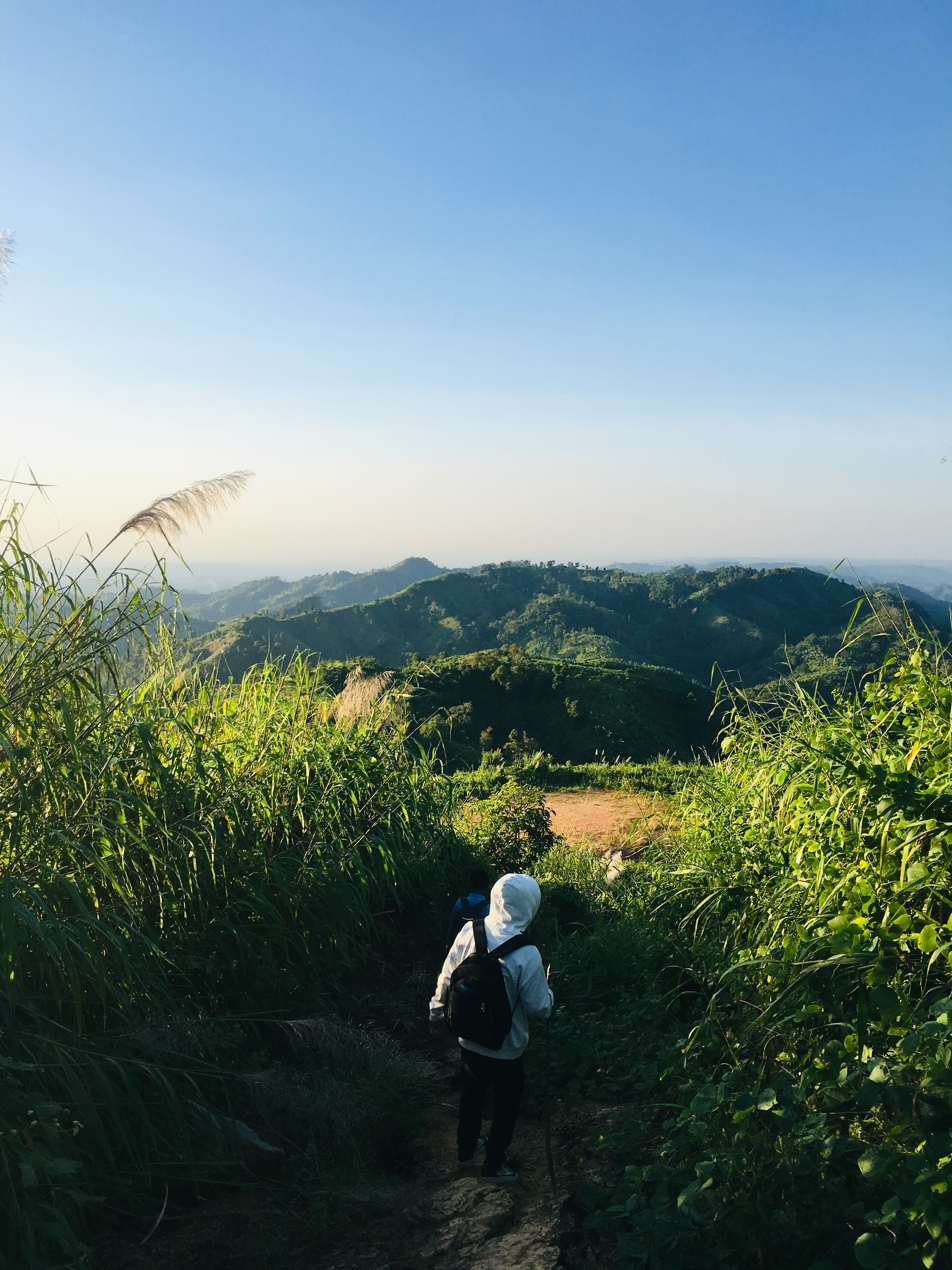
Top view of Marayan Thong peak

Another popular point is Marayan Thong, a hill in the Mirinja Range of Alikadam Police Station in Bandarban District. This hill is also known as Marayan Tong, Maraing Tong, Merai Thong Jadi, Maraing Dong, etc. There is a Buddhist shrine on the top of this hill which is about 1650 feet high. The huge Buddha statues here are in the open nature, with the mountains on the horizon, the river Matamuhuri flowing below, and the crop fields. Most of the tribals including Tripura, Marma, and Murang people live in this Marayong Thong hill. Indigenous neighborhoods in the foothills have added special diversity to the beauty of the hills of Ali Kadam. The lifestyle of the people who depend on the mountains and the pure nature fills the eyes of the tourists who come here.

== Administration ==
Alikadam Upazila is divided into four union parishads: Alikadam Sadar, Chwekhyong, Kurukpata and Nayapara.

== Education ==
There is a shortage of high schools in the area. there is only 1 government high school in Ali Kadam.

== See also ==
- Upazilas of Bangladesh
- Districts of Bangladesh
- Divisions of Bangladesh
- Thanas of Bangladesh
- Union councils of Bangladesh
- Administrative geography of Bangladesh
- Villages of Bangladesh
