= Nowapatang Union =

Union of Bandarban District, Chittagong, Bangladesh

Nawapotong নোয়াপতং
- Union
- Interactive map of Nawapotong
- Country: Bangladesh
- Division: Chittagong Division
- District: Bandarban District
- Upazila: Rowangchhari Upazila

Area
  - Total: 72.52 km^{2} (28.00 sq mi)

Population (2022)
  - Total: 4,554
  - Density: 62.80/km^{2} (162.6/sq mi)
- Time zone: UTC+6 (BST)
- Postal code: 4610
- Website: nawapotongup.bandarban.gov.bd

Nawapotong Union is a union of Rowangchhari Upazila under Bandarban District, Bangladesh.

== Demography ==
According to 2022 census, total population of the Union are 4,554. Among them, 83 are Muslim, 3,687 are Buddhist, 774 are Christian, 10 are Hindu and 1,653 are others.

Religion-2022
1. Buddhism (81.0%)
2. Christianity (17.0%)
3. Islam (1.82%)
4. Hinduism (0.22%)
5. Others (0.00%)

== Ethnicity ==
This Union is home to a variety of different ethnic groups. Among them, 106 are Bengali, 2,645 are Marma, 520 are Tripura and 1,283 are of others ethnic groups.

Ethnicity-2022
1. Marma (58.1%)
2. Tripura (11.4%)
3. Bengali (2.33%)
4. Others (28.2%)
