= Remakri Union =

Union of Bandarban District, Chittagong, Bangladesh

Remakri রেমাক্রী
- Union
- Interactive map of Remakri
- Country: Bangladesh
- Division: Chittagong Division
- District: Bandarban District
- Upazila: Thanchi Upazila

Area
  - Total: 98.42 km^{2} (38.00 sq mi)

Population (2022)
  - Total: 8,148
  - Density: 82.79/km^{2} (214.4/sq mi)
- Time zone: UTC+6 (BST)
- Postal code: 4630
- Website: remakreup.bandarban.gov.bd

Remakri/Remakry/Remakre Union is a union of Thanchi Upazila under Bandarban District.

== Demography ==
According to 2022 census, total population of the Union are 8,148. Among them, 3,280 are Buddhist, 2,940 are Christian, 450 are Muslim, 22 are Hindu and 1,456 are others.

Religion-2022
1. Buddhism (40.3%)
2. Christianity (36.1%)
3. Islam (5.52%)
4. Hinduism (0.27%)
5. Others (17.9%)

== Ethnicity ==
This Union is home to a variety of different ethnic groups. Among them, 850 are Bengali, 2,743 are Marma, 2,089 are Tripura, 1,645 are Mru and 821 are of others ethnic groups.

Ethnicity-2022
1. Marma (33.7%)
2. Tripura (25.6%)
3. Mru (20.2%)
4. Bengali (10.4%)
5. Others (10.1%)
