= Thanchi Union =

Union of Bandarban District, Chittagong, Bangladesh

Thanchi Sadar থানচি সদর
- Union
- Interactive map of Thanchi Sadar
- Country: Bangladesh
- Division: Chittagong Division
- District: Bandarban District
- Upazila: Thanchi Upazila

Area
  - Total: 280.08 km^{2} (108.14 sq mi)

Population (2022)
  - Total: 9,835
  - Density: 35.11/km^{2} (90.95/sq mi)
- Time zone: UTC+6 (BST)
- Postal code: 4630
- Website: thanchisadarup.bandarban.gov.bd

Thanchi Sadar Union is a union of Thanchi Upazila under Bandarban District.

== Demography ==
According to 2022 census, total population of the Union are 9,835 . Among them, 4,081 are Buddhist, 2,636 are Christian, 1,273 are Muslim, 195 are Hindu and 1,650 are others.

Religion-2022
1. Buddhism (41.5%)
2. Christianity (26.8%)
3. Islam (12.9%)
4. Hinduism (1.98%)
5. Krama and Others (16.8%)

== Ethnicity ==
This Union is home to a variety of different ethnic groups. Among them, 1,554 are Bengali, 3,663 are Mru, 2,450 are Marma, 1,435 are Tripura and 734 are of others ethnic groups.

Ethnicity-2022
1. Mru (37.2%)
2. Marma (24.9%)
3. Bengali (15.8%)
4. Tripura (14.6%)
5. Others (7.45%)
