= Ruma Upazila =

Ruma রুমা
- Upazila
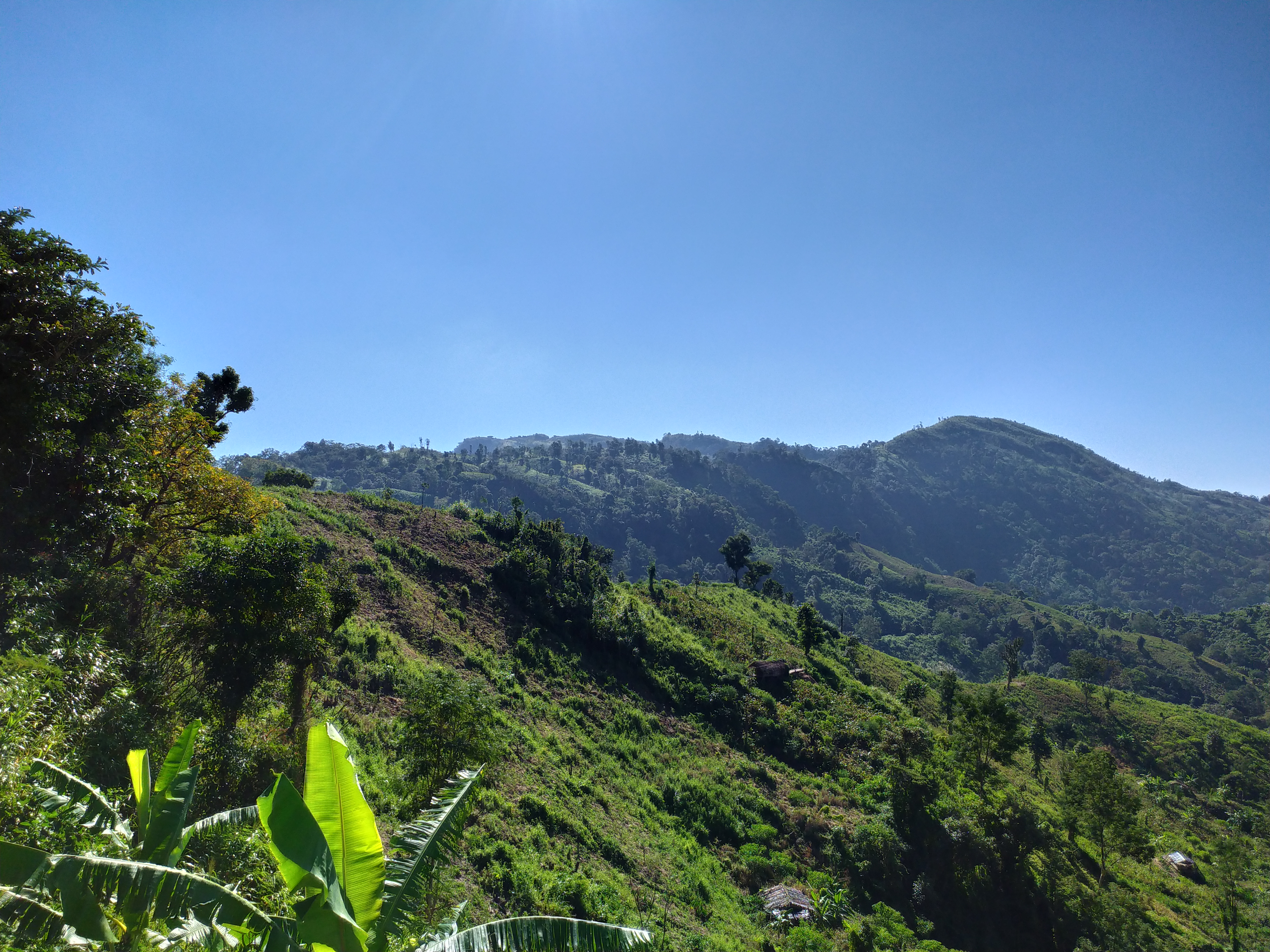
- Keokradong peak

- Coordinates: 22°3′N 92°25′E
- Country: Bangladesh
- Division: Chittagong
- District: Bandarban

Area
  - Total: 492.09 km^{2} (190.00 sq mi)

Population (2022)
  - Total: 32,533
  - Density: 66.112/km^{2} (171.23/sq mi)
- Time zone: UTC+6 (BST)
- Postal code: 4620
- Website: Official Map of Ruma

Ruma Upazila mauza geocode map

Ruma (Bengali: রুমা) is an upazila (subdistrict) of Bandarban District in Chittagong, Bangladesh.

== Geography ==
Ruma is located at 22.0500°N 92.4167°E. It has 5,917 households and a total area of 492.09 km^{2}.

== Demographics ==
According to the 2022 Bangladeshi census, Ruma Upazila had 7,318 households and a population of 32,533. 12.00% of the population were under 5 years of age. Ruma had a literacy rate (age 7 and over) of 50.26%: 59.30% for males and 40.35% for females, and a sex ratio of 108.75 males for every 100 females. 7,769 (23.88%) lived in urban areas.

=== Ethnicity and religion ===
Religions in Ruma Upazila (2022)
Religion	Percent
Christianity	37.32%
Buddhism	36.80%
Islam	7.38%
Hinduism	1.71%
Other or not stated	16.79%

Population by religion in Union
Union	Buddhist	Christian	Muslim	Hindu	Tribal
Ghalangya	1,528	1,680	20	8	3,375
Paindu	3,842	2,050	74	2	0
Remakripransa	117	3,882	60	12	1,248
Ruma	6,484	4,530	2,247	534	840

🟨Buddhist majority 🟦Christian Majority 🟥Tribal Religion Majority

As of the 2022 Bangladeshi census, Ruma upazila had a population of 32,533. The ethnic population was 28,298 (86.98%), of which there were 10,097 Marmas, 7,157 Mru, 6,470 Bom, 2,913 Tripuri, 890 Khumi, 305 Chakmas and 241 Tanchangyas.

Ethnicity in Ruma Upazila (2022)
1. Marma (31.0%)
2. Mro (22.0%)
3. Bom (19.9%)
4. Bengali (13.0%)
5. Tripura (8.95%)
6. Khumi (2.74%)
7. Chakma (0.94%)
8. Tanchangya (0.74%)
9. Others (0.68%)

Population by ethnicity in Union
Union	Bengali	Marma	Mro	Tripura	Others
Ghalangya	32	1,067	4,379	864	269
Paindu	136	3,564	0	0	2,268
Remakripransa	476	24	1,359	1,215	2,245
Ruma	3,591	5,442	1,419	834	3,349

🟦 Marma majority 🟫 Mro majority 🟥 Others majority

== Points of interest ==
- Bagakain Lake
- Keokradong
- Tazing Dong
- Nilgiri Resort
- Rijuk Waterfall

== Administration ==
Ruma Upazila is divided into four union parishads: Ghalangya, Paindu, Remakri Pransa, and Ruma. The union parishads are subdivided into 15 mauzas and 225 villages.

== See also ==
- Upazilas of Bangladesh
- Districts of Bangladesh
- Divisions of Bangladesh
- Administrative geography of Bangladesh
