= Thanchi Upazila =

Thanchi থানচি
- Upazila
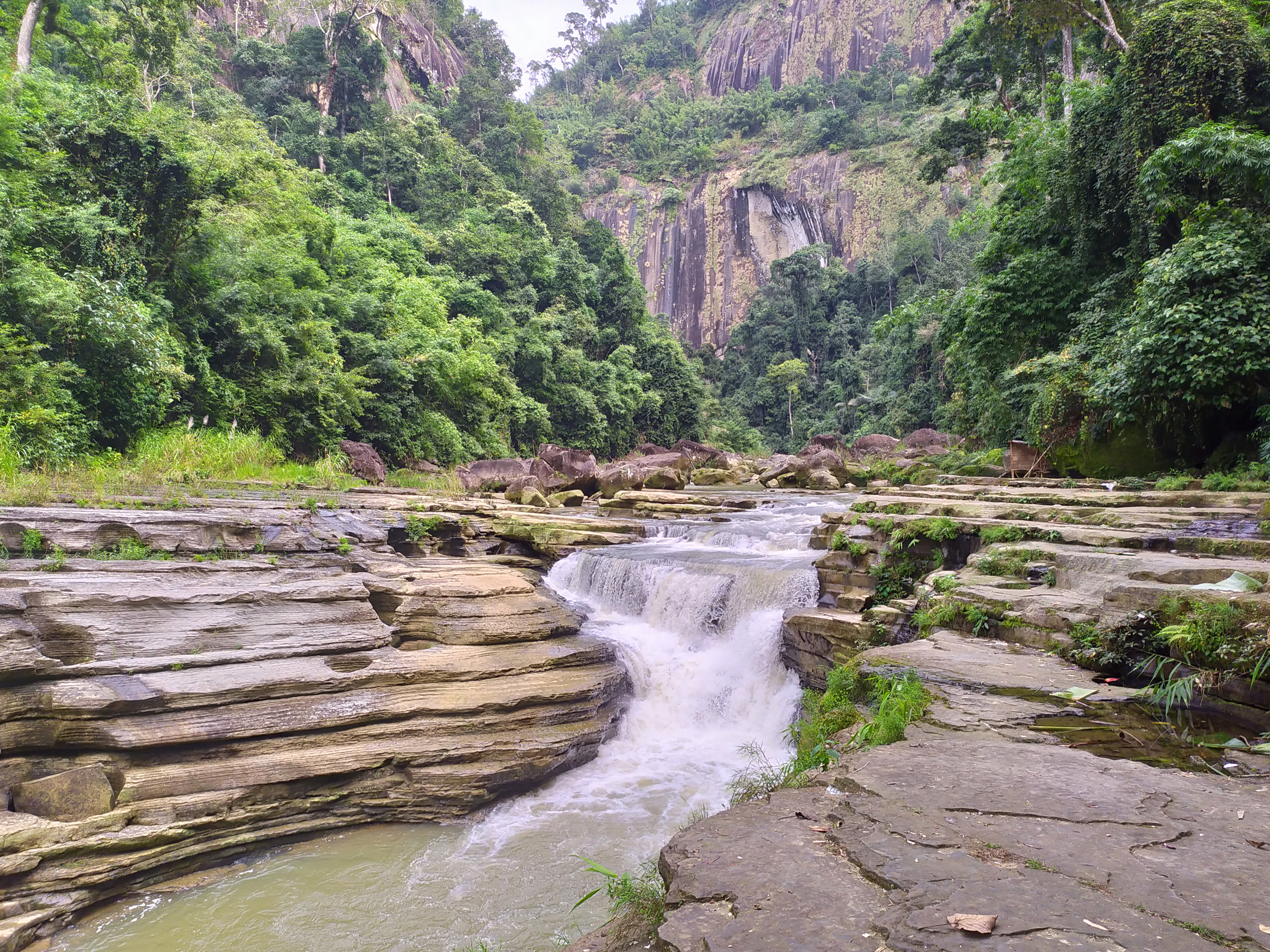
- Amiakhum Falls

- Coordinates: 21°47.2′N 92°25.7′E
- Country: Bangladesh
- Division: Chittagong
- District: Bandarban

Area
  - Total: 1,020.82 km^{2} (394.14 sq mi)

Population (2022)
  - Total: 29,790
  - Density: 29.18/km^{2} (75.58/sq mi)
- Time zone: UTC+6 (BST)
- Postal code: 4630
- Website: Official Map of Thanchi

Thanchi Upazila mauza geocode map

Thanchi (Bengali: থানচি) is an upazila of Bandarban District in the Division of Chittagong, Bangladesh.

== Geography ==
Thanchi is located at 21.7861°N 92.4278°E. It has 4,872 households and a total area of 1020.82 km^{2}. Thanchi upazila is bordered by Ruma upazila and Rangamati district to the north, Lama and Alikadam upazilas to the west, Rakhine State of Myanmar to the south and Chin State of Myanmar to the east.

At the boundary with Ali Kadam Upazila, the 35-kilometre-long (22 mi) Alikadam-Thanchi Road ascends hill Dim Pahar, making it one of the highest motorable roads in Bangladesh.

== Demographics ==
According to the 2022 Bangladeshi census, Thanchi Upazila had 6,296 households and a population of 29,790. 11.95% of the population were under 5 years of age. Thanchi had a literacy rate (age 7 and over) of 50.68%: 60.80% for males and 39.16% for females, and a sex ratio of 111.37 males for every 100 females. 10,253 (34.42%) lived in urban areas.

=== Ethnicity and religion ===
Religions in Thanchi Upazila (2022)
| Religion | Percent |
| Buddhism | 42.34% |
| Christianity | 34.43% |
| Islam | 8.80% |
| Hinduism | 1.55% |
| Other or not stated | 12.87% |

Population by religion in Union
| Union | Muslim | Buddhist | Christian | Hindu | Others |
|---|---|---|---|---|---|
| Balipara | 810 | 3,783 | 1,541 | 244 | 119 |
| Remakri | 450 | 3,280 | 2,940 | 22 | 1456 |
| Thanchi | 1273 | 4,081 | 2,636 | 195 | 1650 |
| Tindu | 89 | 1,470 | 3,139 | 2 | 610 |

🟨 Buddhist majority 🟦 Christian majority

As of the 2022 Bangladeshi census, Thanchi upazila had a population of 29,790. The ethnic population was 26,103 (87.62%), of which Marma were 9,345, Mru 7,021,Tripura 6,336, Khumi 1,829, Bom 685, Chakma 488 and Khyang 359.

Ethnicity in Thanchi Upazila (2022)
1. Marma (31.4%)
2. Mro (23.6%)
3. Tripura (21.3%)
4. Bengali (12.4%)
5. Khumi (6.14%)
6. Bom (2.30%)
7. Chakma (1.64%)
8. Khyang (1.21%)
9. Others (0.12%)

Population by ethnicity in Union
| Union | Bengali | Marma | Mro | Tripura | Others |
|---|---|---|---|---|---|
| Balipara | 1,183 | 2,991 | 459 | 1,182 | 682 |
| Remakri | 850 | 2,743 | 1,645 | 2,089 | 821 |
| Thanchi | 1,554 | 2,450 | 3,663 | 1,435 | 733 |
| Tindu | 100 | 1,161 | 1,254 | 1,630 | 1,165 |

🟦 Marma majority 🟧 Tripura majority 🟫 Mro majority

== Administration ==
Thanchi Upazila is divided into four union parishads: Balipara, Remakri, Thanchi Sadar, and Tindu. The union parishads are subdivided into 12 mauzas and 178 villages.

== Gallery ==
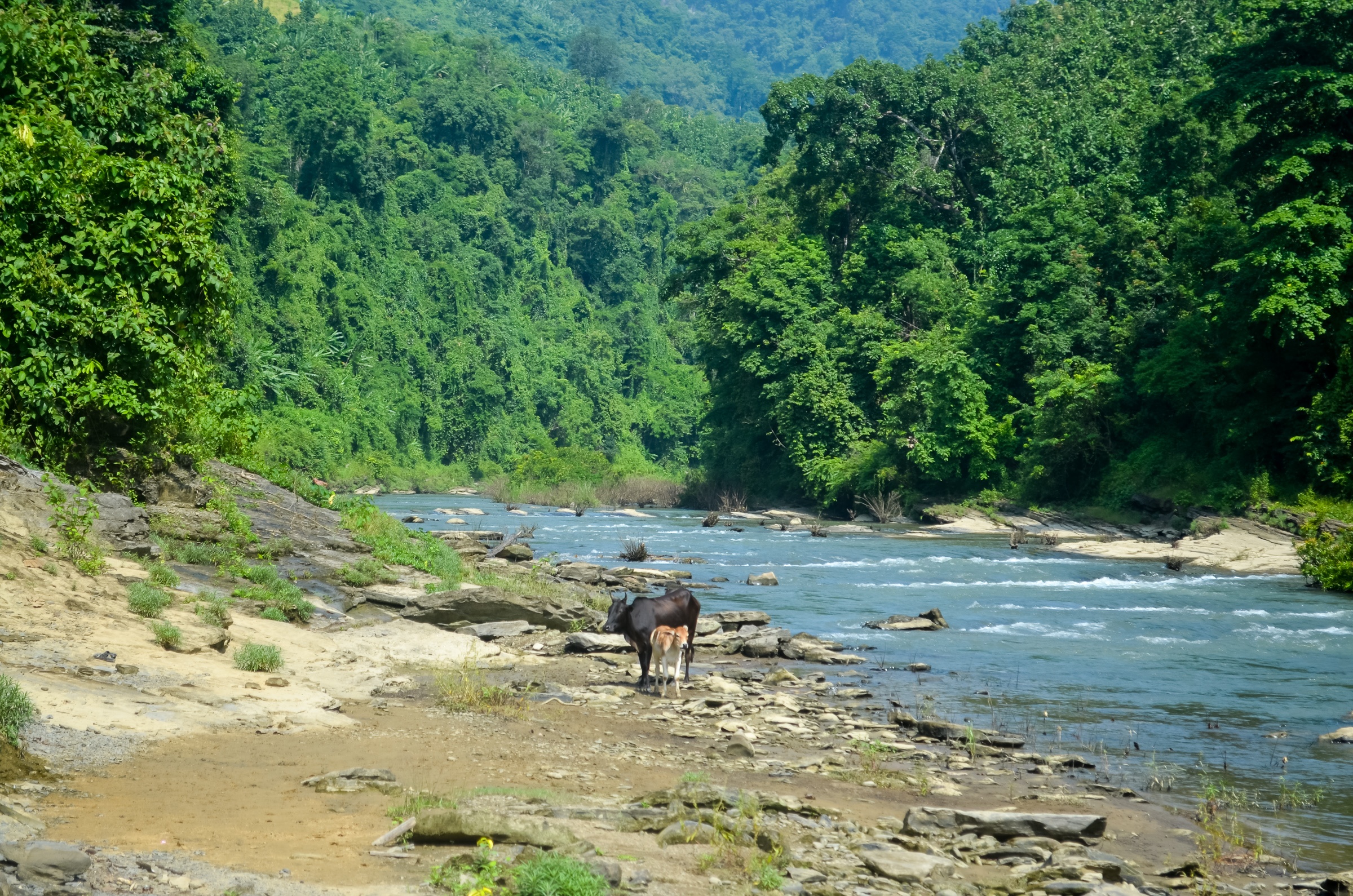
Remakri lake

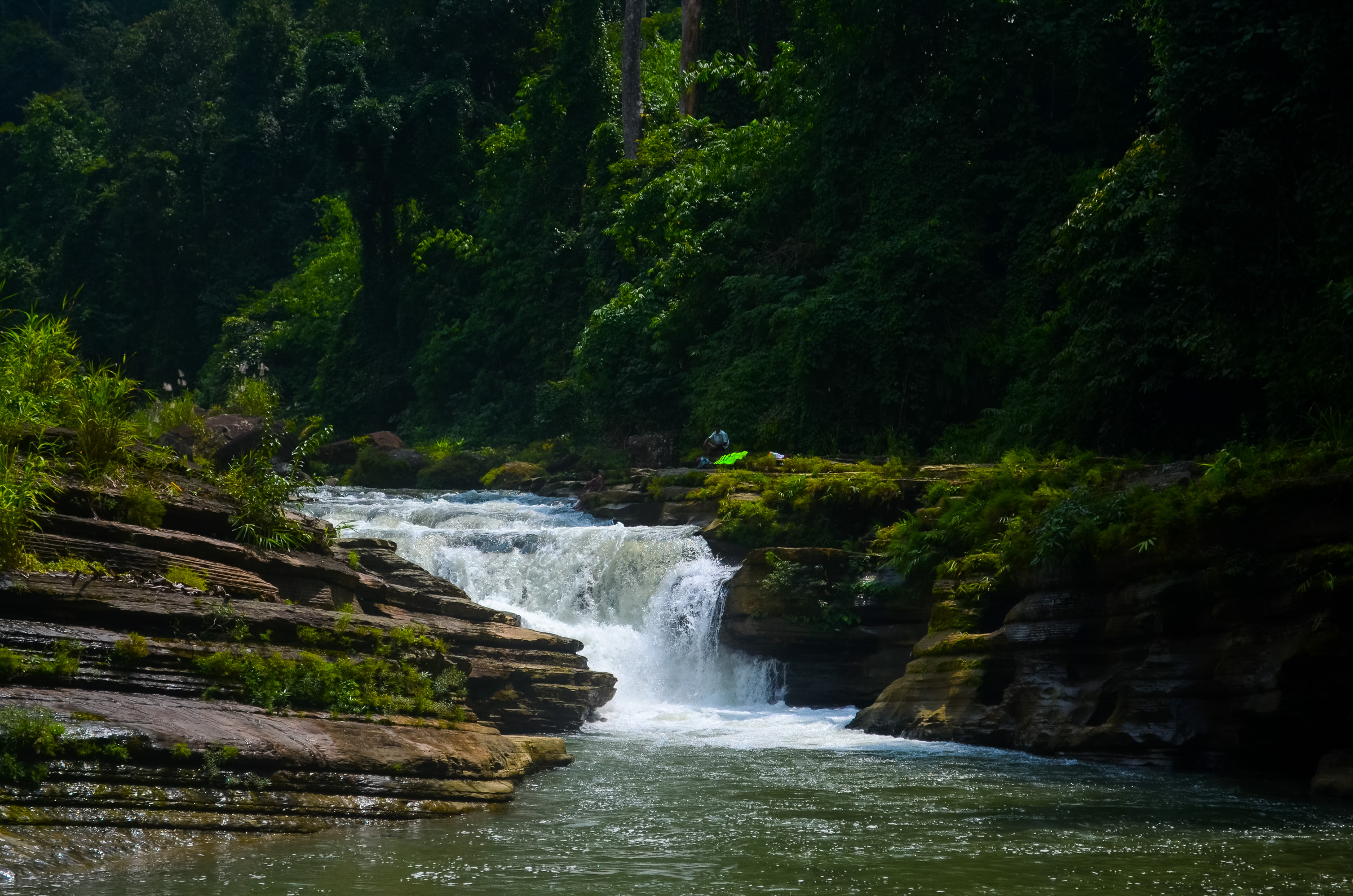
Amiakhum waterfall

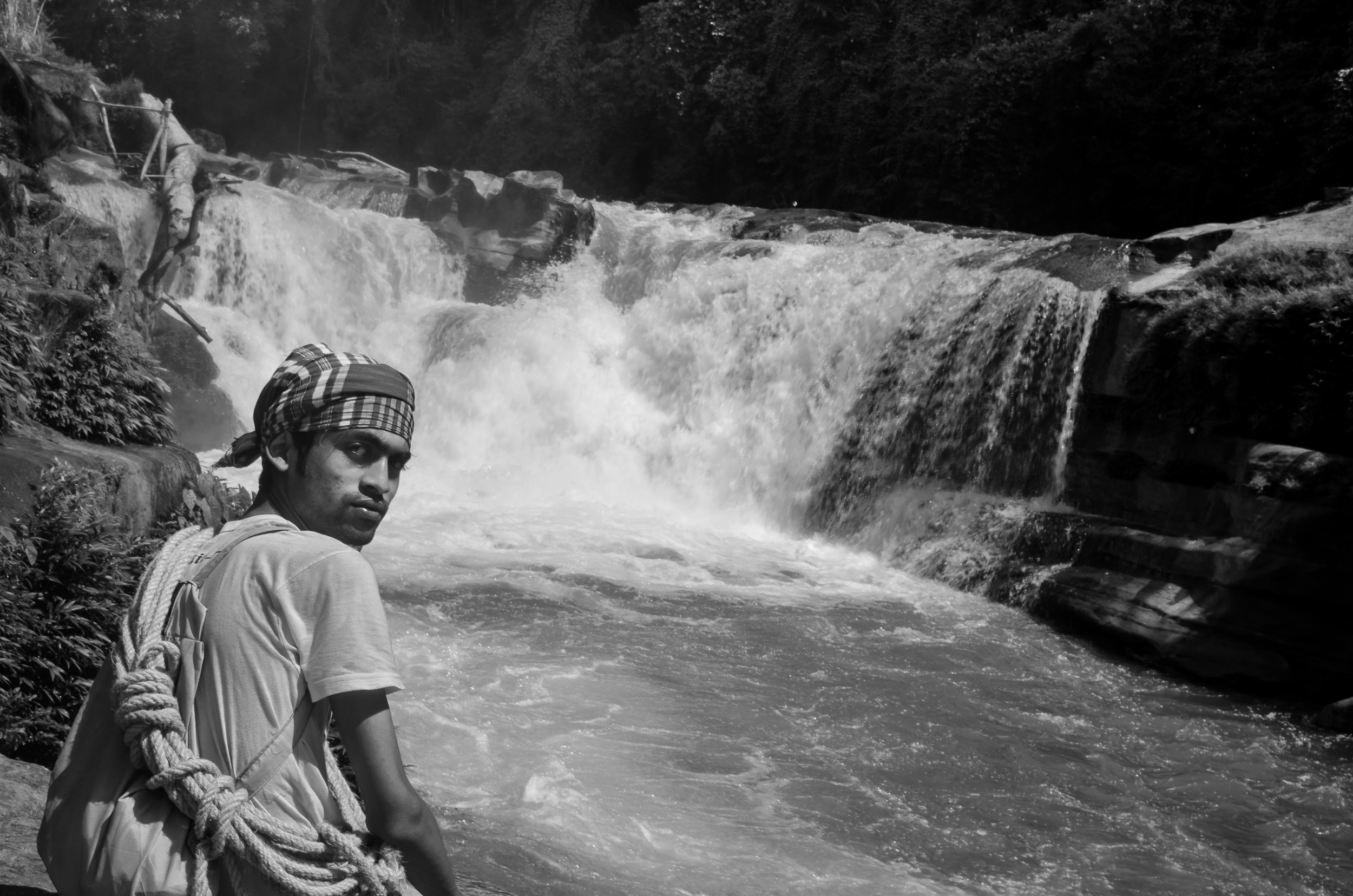
Nafakhum waterfall

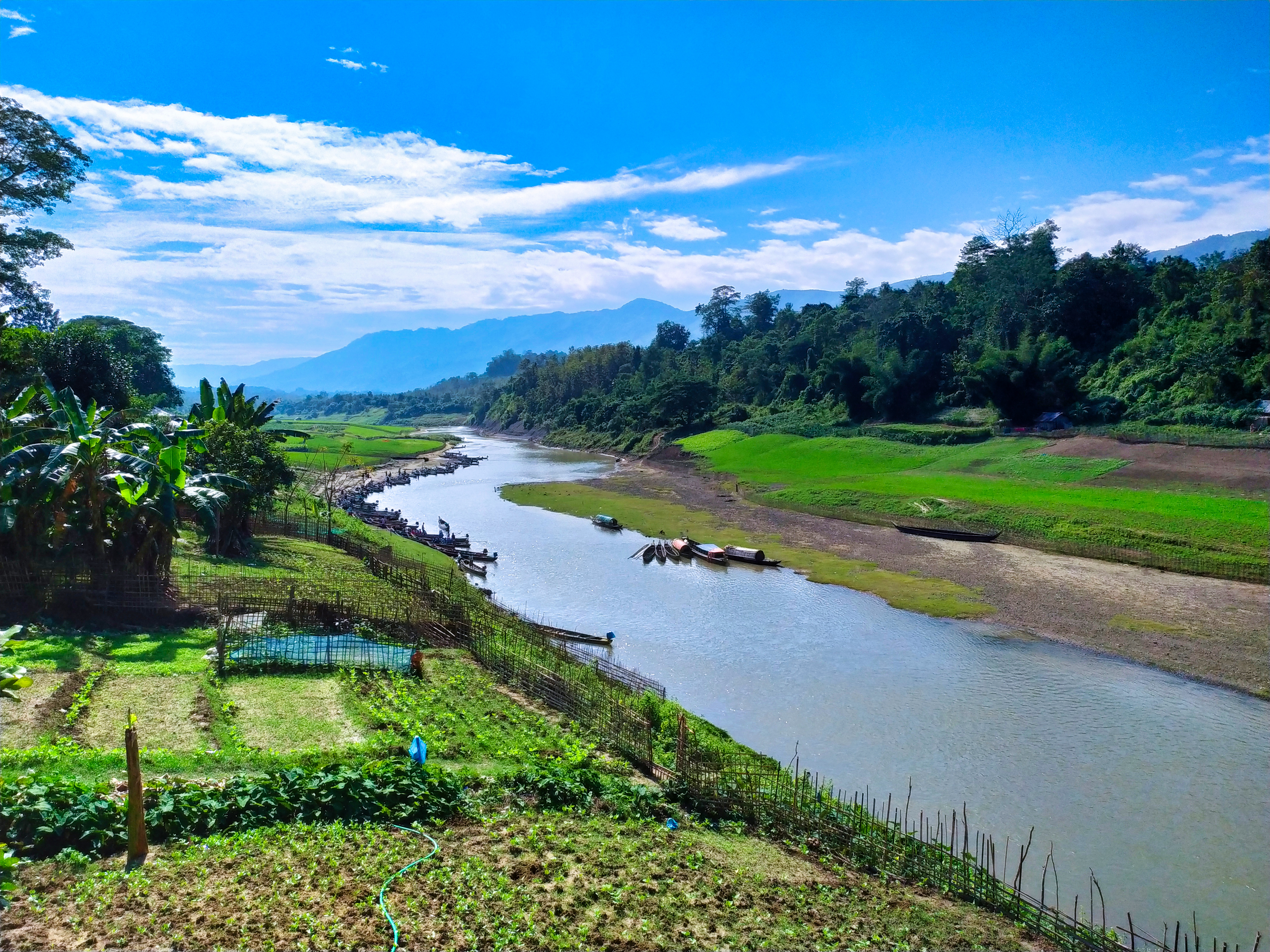
Sangu river

== See also ==
- Upazilas of Bangladesh
- Districts of Bangladesh
- Divisions of Bangladesh
