= Bawm people =

Ethnic community in Bangladesh

Bawm
Bawmzo
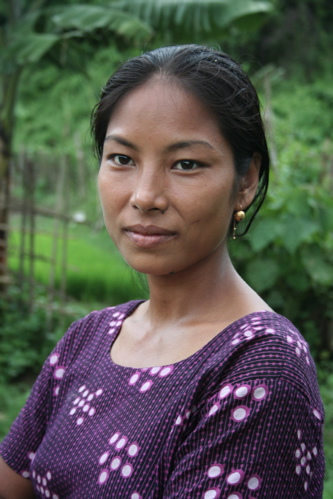
- Bawm woman from the Chittagong Hill Tracts

Regions with significant populations
- Bangladesh: 13,193
- India: c. 3,000
- Myanmar: 2,500

Languages
- Bawm, Chittagonian, Bengali

Religion
- Protestant Christianity

Related ethnic groups
- Hmar · Chin · Kuki-Zo · Mizo

- People: Bawmzo
- Language: Banjogi
- Country: Bawmram, Bangladesh, Myanmar, India

The Bawm or Bawmzo are an ethnic community inhabiting the Chittagong Hill Tracts of Bangladesh. According to the 2022 Bangladeshi census the population of Bawms in Bangladesh is 13,193. In 2025, around 3,000 Bawm inhabited India. 2,500 Bawms reside in Myanmar. They speak the Bawm language which is part of the Kuki-Chin language branch.

== Geographical distribution ==
According to the 2022 Bangladeshi census, there are 13,193 Bom in Bangladesh. Among them, 11,854 (89.85%) Boms live in Bandarban District, constituting 2.46% of district's population. They also live in Belaichhari Upazila of Rangamati District and surrounding areas.

Upazila	Population	Percentage who are Bom
Ruma Upazila	6,470	19.89%
Rowangchhari Upazila	1,882	6.79%
Bandarban Sadar Upazila	2,748	2.47%
Thanchi Upazila	685	2.30%
Belaichhari Upazila	356	1.21%
Others	<100	<1%
