= Bandarban District =

Bandarban Hill District বান্দরবান পার্বত্য জেলা
- District
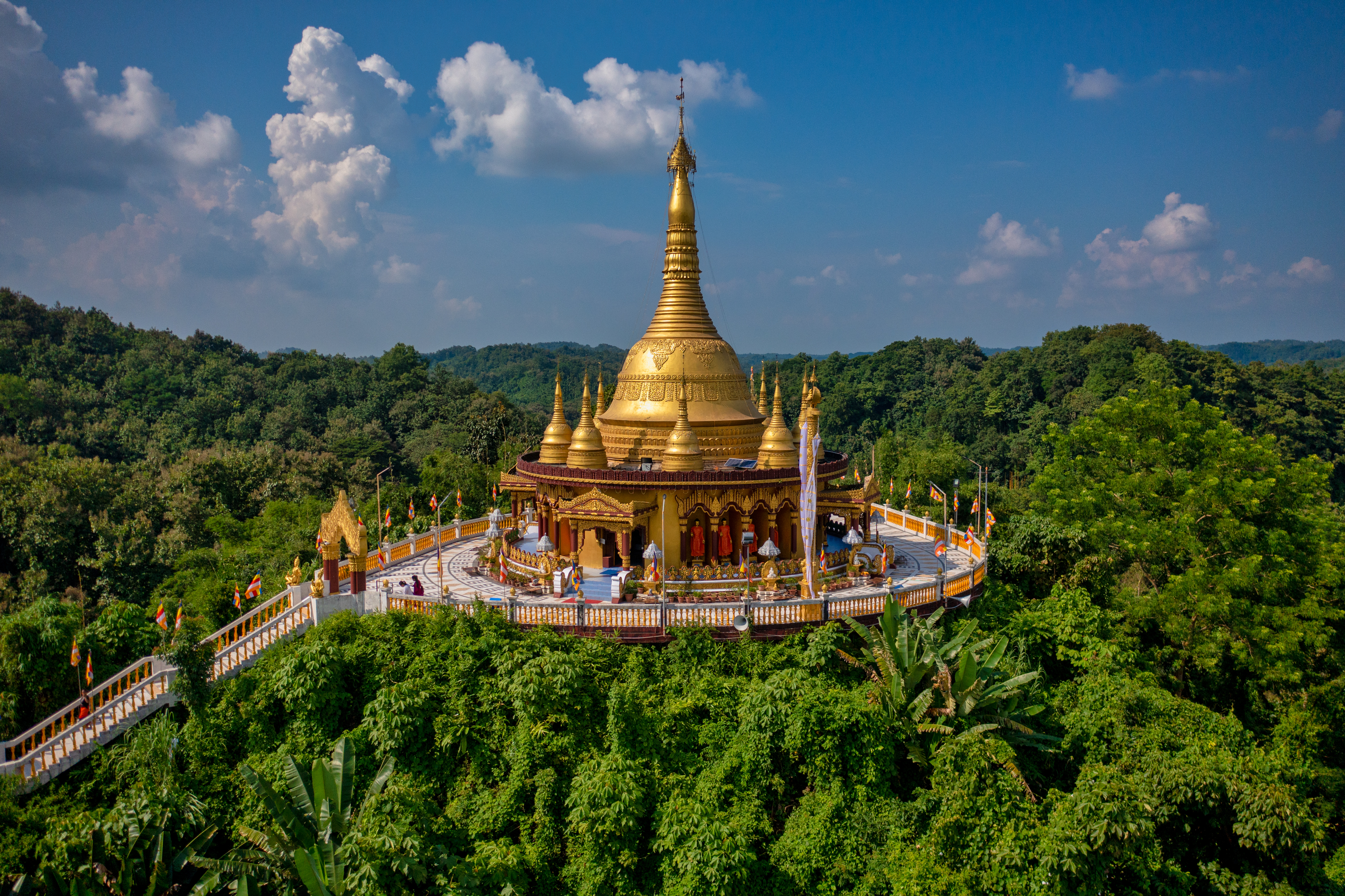
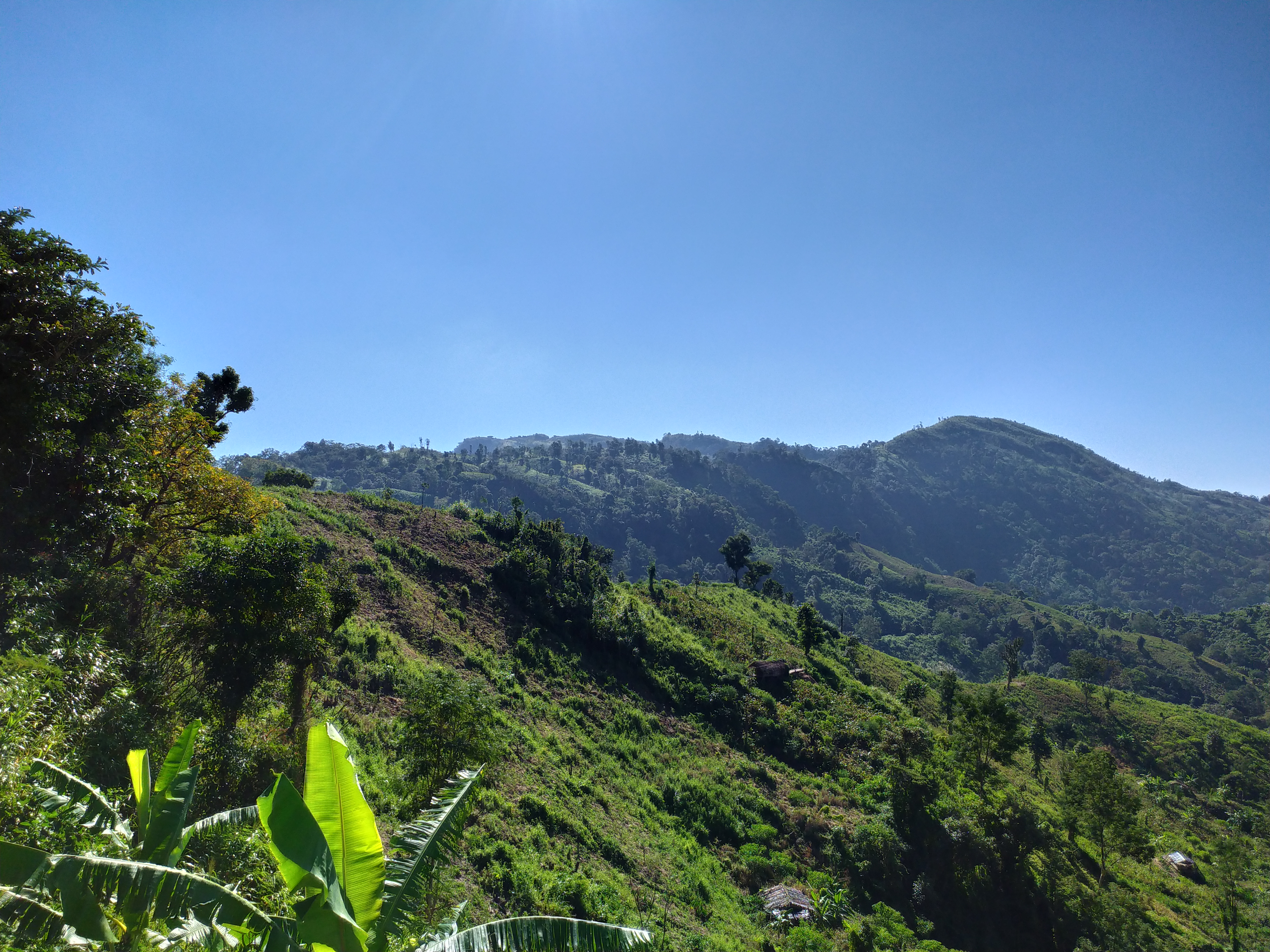
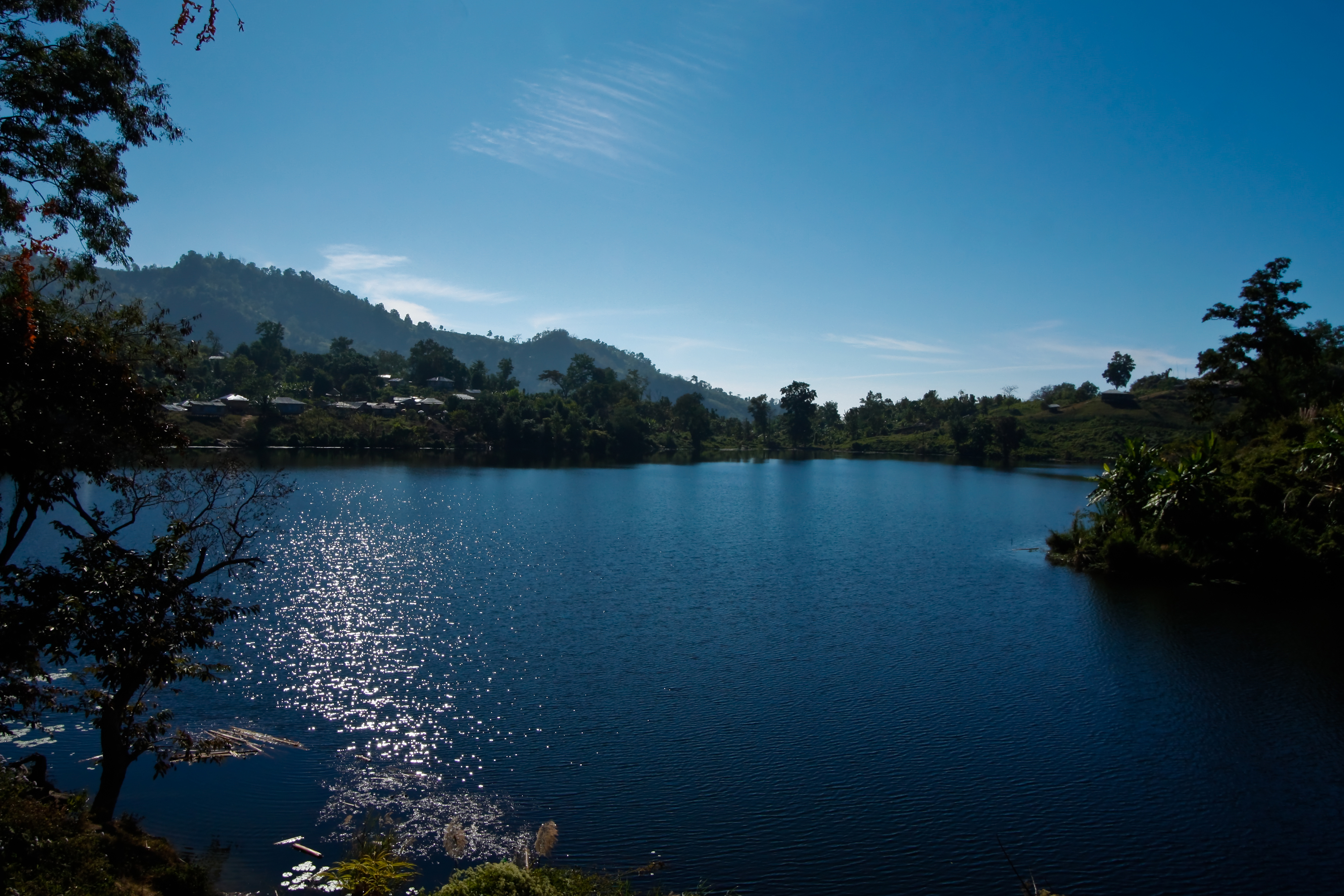
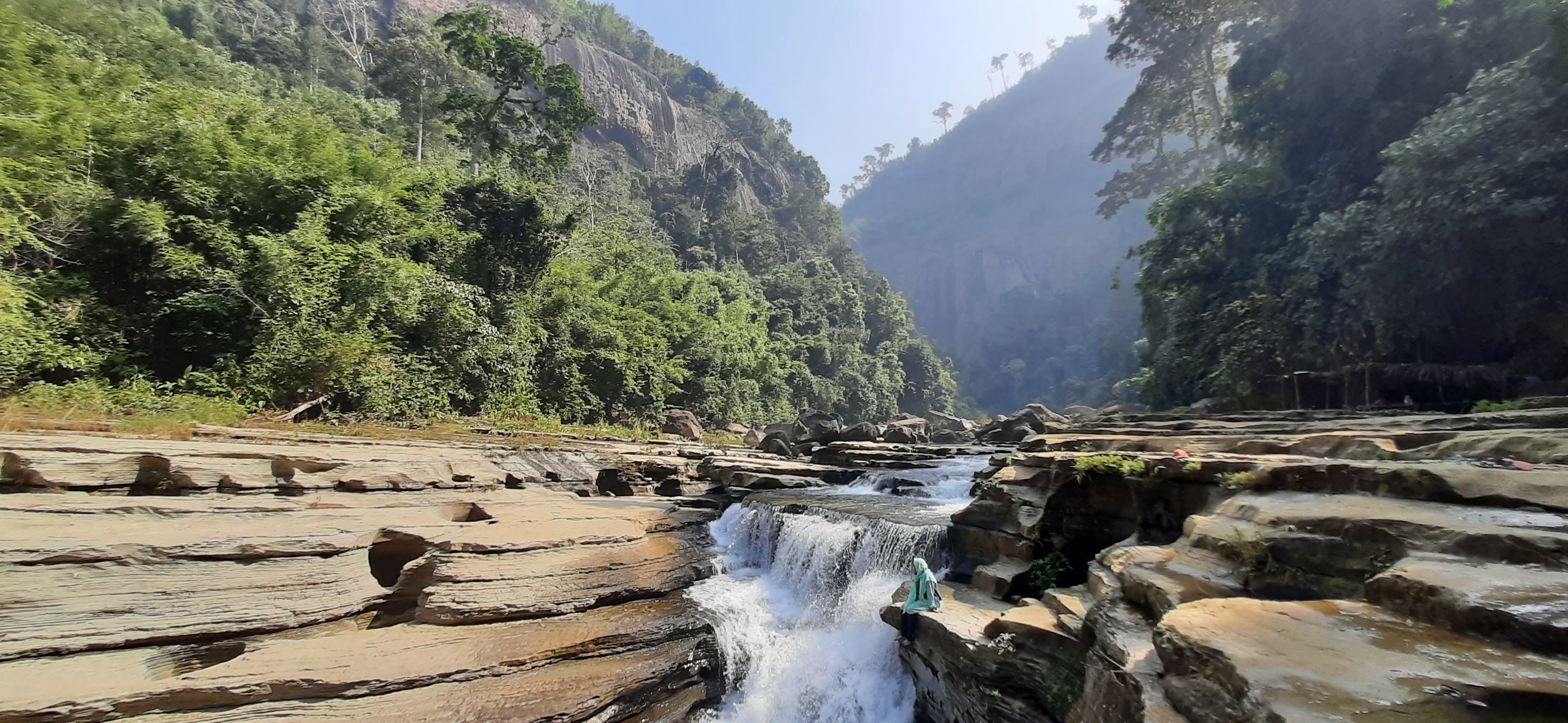
- Clockwise from top-left: Buddha Dhatu Jadi, Boga Lake, Amiakhum Waterfall, Keokradong
- Interactive map of Bandarban Hill District
- Coordinates: 21°48′N 92°24′E
- Country: Bangladesh
- Division: Chittagong Division
- As a District: 18 April 1981
- Capital: Bandarban

Government
  - Type: District Council
  - Body: Bandarban Hill District Council
  - Deputy Commissioner: Yasmin Parvin Tibriji
  - Chief Executive Officer: A. T. M. Kawser Hossain

Area
  - Total: 4,479.03 km^{2} (1,729.36 sq mi)

Population (2022)
  - Total: 481,106
  - Density: 107.413/km^{2} (278.198/sq mi)
- Time zone: UTC+06:00 (BST)
- Postal code: 4600
- Area code: 0361
- ISO 3166 code: BD-01
- HDI (2019): 0.574 medium · 19th of 20
- Website: bandarban.gov.bd

Bandarban District (Bengali: বান্দরবান জেলা), officially Bandarban Hill District, is a district in South-Eastern Bangladesh, and a part of the Chittagong Division. It is one of the three hill districts of Bangladesh and a part of the Chittagong Hill Tracts, the others being Rangamati District and Khagrachhari District. Bandarban district (4,479 km^{2}) is not only the most remote district of the country, but also the least populous (population 388,000). There is an army contingent at Bandarban Cantonment.

== Demographics ==
Historical population
Year	Pop.	±% p.a.
1974	116,426	—
1981	171,478	+5.69%
1991	230,569	+3.01%
2001	298,120	+2.60%
2011	388,335	+2.68%
2022	481,106	+1.97%

According to the 2022 Census of Bangladesh, Bandarban District had 106,065 households and a population of 481,106 with an average 4.41 people per household. Among the population, 110,625 (22.99%) inhabitants were under 10 years of age. The population density was 107 people per km^{2}. The literacy rate (age 7 and over) was 63.74%, compared to the national average of 74.80%. The sex ratio of the district was at 105 males for 100 females. Approximately, 40.41% of the population lived in urban areas.

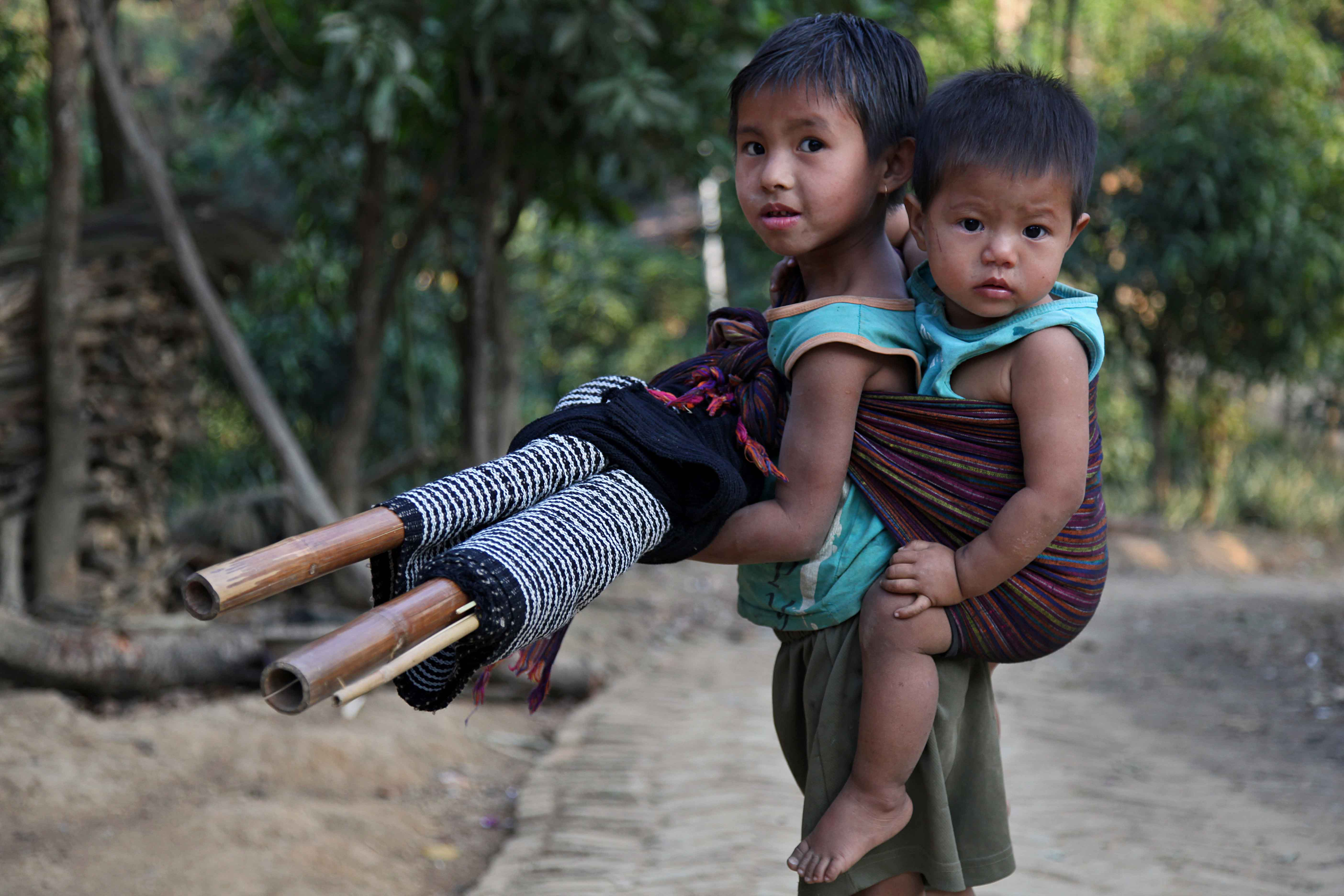
Tribal children

As per the 2022 census, there were 283,123 (58.85%) Bengalis and 197,983 (41.15%) minorities (called Upojati) people in the district. The population of major ethnic minorities living in the district besides the Bengalis, are: Marma: 84,170, Mro/Murong 51,448, Tripura 22,572, Tanchangya 14,889, Bom 11,854, Chakma 3,712, Khumi 3,287, Chak 2,662, Khyang 2,502.

Ethnicity in Bandarban District (2022)
1. Bengali (58.9%)
2. Marma (17.5%)
3. Mro (10.7%)
4. Tripura (4.69%)
5. Tanchangya (3.09%)
6. Bom (2.46%)
7. Chakma (0.77%)
8. Khumi (0.68%)
9. Chak (0.55%)
10. Khyang (0.52%)
11. Others (0.21%)

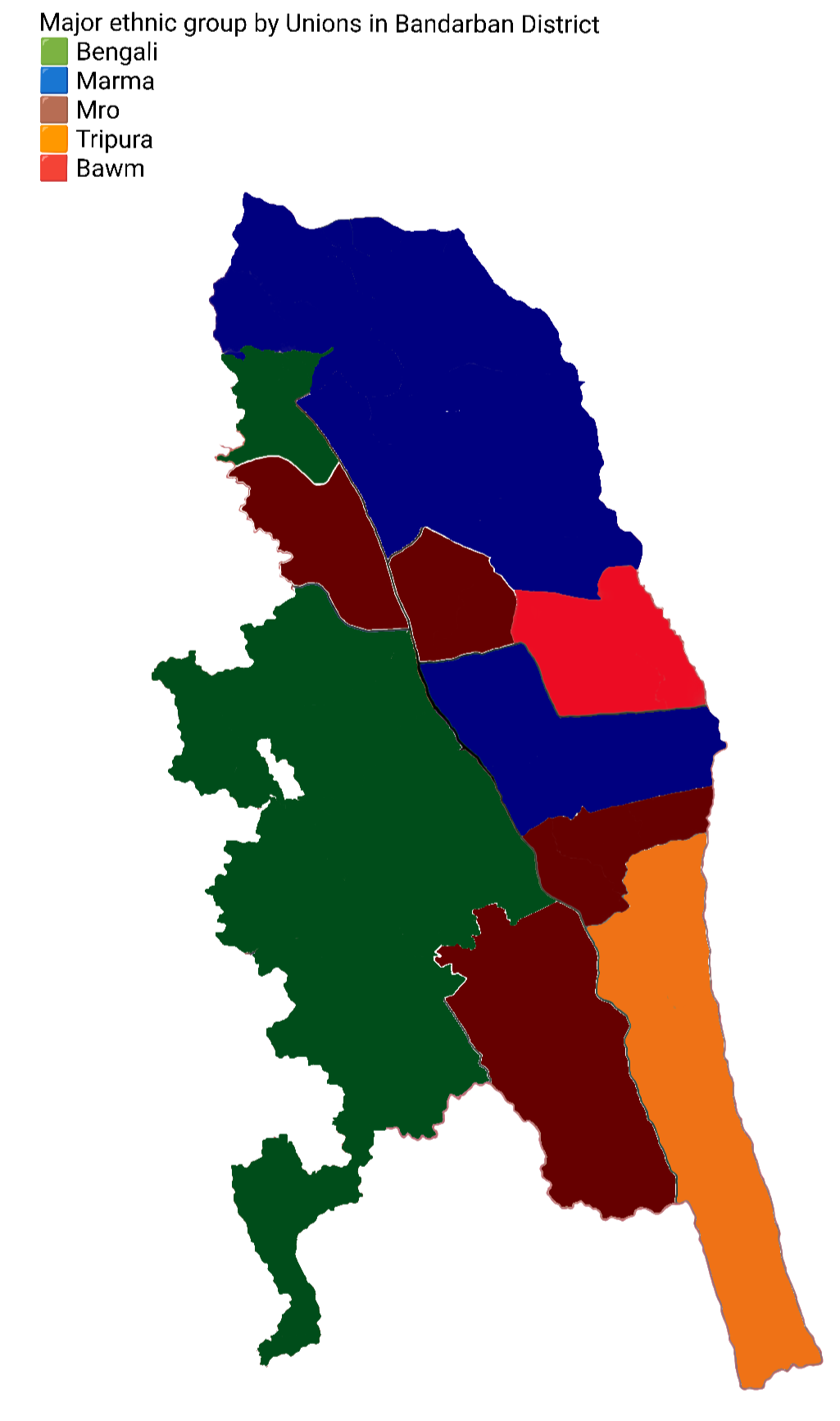
Largest ethnic group by unions in Bandarban District

Population by ethnicity in Unions of Bandarban District
Upazila	Union	Bengali	Marma	Mro	Tripura	Others
Sadar	Bandarban Paurashava	42,453	7,272	400	981	3,344
Sadar	Bandarban	4,465	2,803	35	276	2,593
Sadar	Jamchhari	1,224	4,493	50	2	933
Sadar	Kuhalong	4,055	6,567	102	211	2,338
Sadar	Rajbila	1,890	3,655	18	110	787
Sadar	Sualak	7,590	1,828	1,931	31	1,987
Sadar	Tankabati	1,615	10	4,744	160	143
Lama	Lama Paurashava	19,717	2,638	151	74	75
Lama	Aziznagar	11,683	492	173	345	16
Lama	Faitang	12,124	2,216	56	323	15
Lama	Fansiakhali	31,512	2,395	1,201	1,079	22
Lama	Gajalia	4,497	4,453	2,885	1,887	156
Lama	Lama	7,084	605	1,685	739	6
Lama	Rupshipara	9,188	2,551	2,492	270	15
Lama	Sarai	10,667	469	2,138	1,028	561
Alikadam	Alikadam	18,161	623	2,473	1,370	861
Alikadam	Chaikkhyong	13,203	1,735	2,150	770	264
Alikadam	Kurukpata	301	73	8,906	1,277	649
Alikadam	Nayapara	7,021	1,416	1,639	35	862
Naikhongchhari	Baishari	15,533	1,138	722	33	910
Naikhongchhari	Dochhari	7,469	167	1,601	149	262
Naikhongchhari	Ghumdhum	15,342	133	6	0	2,227
Naikhongchhari	Naikhongchhari	21,558	591	6	5	1,183
Naikhongchhari	Sonaichhari	3,939	2,679	21	15	788
Rowangchhari	Alekkhyong	608	2,387	0	764	2,252
Rowangchhari	Nowapatang	106	2,645	0	520	1,283
Rowangchhari	Rowangchhari	810	4,195	2	402	3,276
Rowangchhari	Tarachha	1,389	4,489	1,683	457	453
Ruma	Ghalangya	32	1,067	4,379	864	269
Ruma	Paindu	136	3,564	0	0	2,268
Ruma	Remakri Pransa	476	24	1,359	1,215	2,245
Ruma	Ruma	3,591	5,442	1,419	834	3,349
Thanchi	Balipara Union	1,183	2,991	459	1,182	682
Thanchi	Remakri	850	2,743	1,645	2,089	821
Thanchi	Thanchi	1,554	2,450	3,663	1,435	733
Thanchi	Tindu	100	1,161	1,254	1,630	1,165

Largest ethnic group in Union and Municipality
Ethnic group	Union	Municipality	Upazila
Bengali	17	2	4
Marma	11	0	3
Mro	4	0	0
Tripura	1	0	0
Bom	1	0	0
Total	34	2	7

=== Bengalis ===
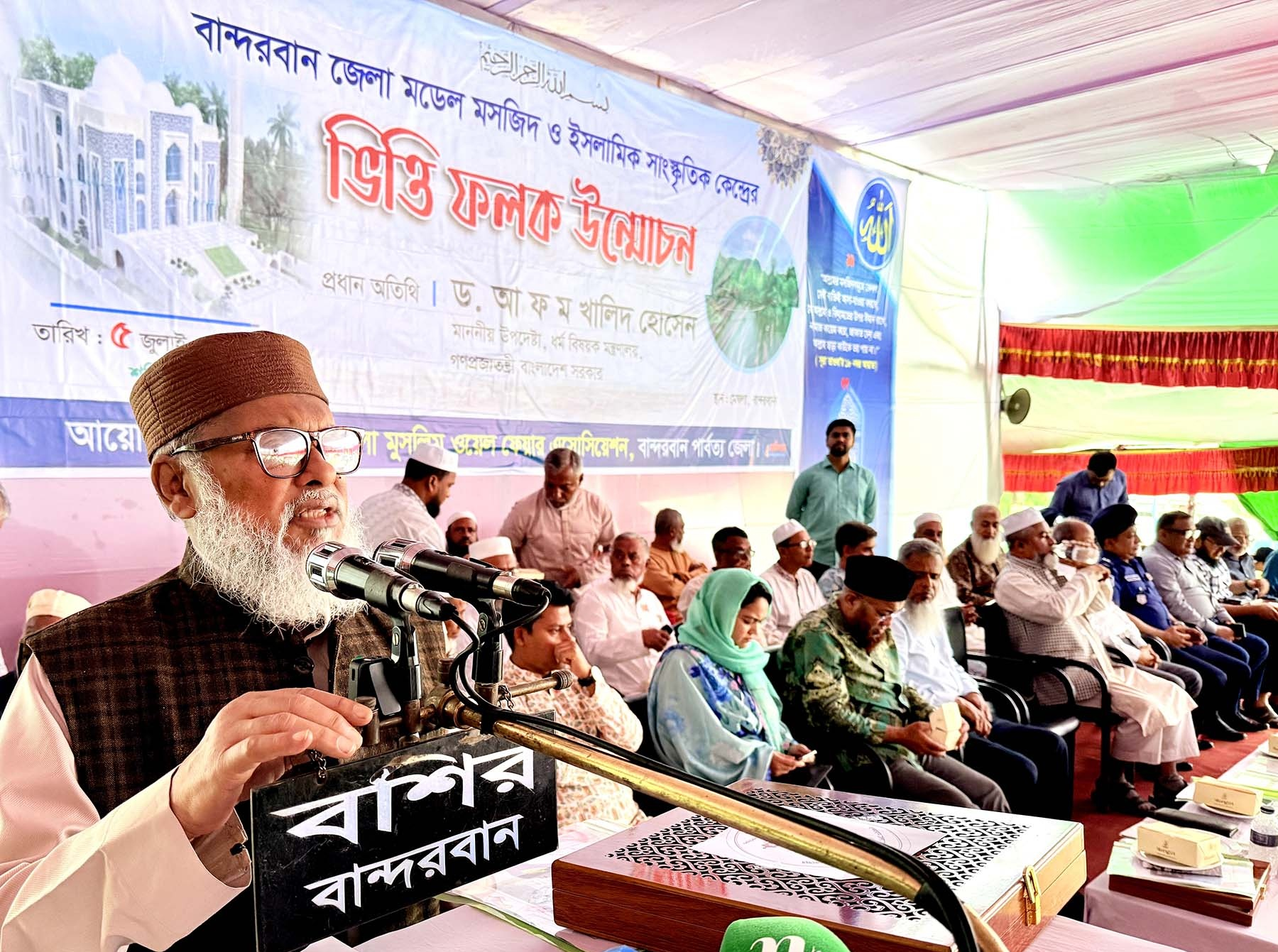
Minister A F M Khalid Hossain delivering a speech at the foundation stone unveiling ceremony of the Bandarban District Model Mosque and Islamic Cultural Center

According to the 2022 census, Bengalis are the largest ethnic group in Bandarban District (58.85%).

By Upazila

Upazila	Population	Percentage
Naikhongchhari Upazila	63,841	83.48%
Lama Upazila	106,468	76.22%
Alikadam Upazila	38,687	60.64%
Bandarban Sadar Upazila	63,292	56.97%
Ruma Upazila	4,235	13.02%
Thanchi Upazila	3,687	12.38%
Rowangchhari Upazila	2,913	10.51%

By Union (Highest 10)

Union	Upazila	Percentage
Naikhongchhari Sadar Union	Naikhongchhari Upazila	92.3%
Aziznagar Union	Lama Upazila	91.9%
Fansiakhali Union	Lama Upazila	87%
Ghumdhum Union	Naikhongchhari Upazila	86.6%
Baishari Union	Naikhongchhari Upazila	84.7%
Faitang Union	Lama Upazila	82.3%
Dochhari Union	Naikhongchhari Upazila	77.4%
Alikadam Union	Alikadam Upazila	77.3%
Chaikkhyong Union	Alikadam Upazila	72.9%
Sarai Union	Lama Upazila	71.8%

=== Marmas ===
According to the 2022 census, Marmas are the second largest ethnic group in Bandarban District (17.50%). By Upazila

Upazila	Population	Percentage of Marmas
Rowangchhari Upazila	13,716	49.48%
Thanchi Upazila	9,345	31.37%
Ruma Upazila	10,097	31.04%
Bandarban Sadar Upazila	26,628	23.97%
Lama Upazila	15,819	11.32%
Naikhongchhari Upazila	4,708	6.16%
Alikadam Upazila	3,857	6.05%

By Union (Highest 10)

Union	Upazila	Percentage
Jamchhari Union	Bandarban Sadar Upazila	67.04%
Paindu Union	Ruma Upazila	59.72%
Nowapatang Union	Rowangchhari Upazila	58.08%
Rajbila Union	Bandarban Sadar Upazila	56.58%
Tarachha Union	Rowangchhari Upazila	53%
Kuhalong Union	Bandarban Sadar Upazila	49.48%
Rowangchhari Sadar Union	Rowangchhari Upazila	48.3%
Balipara Union	Thanchi Upazila	46%
Alekkhyong Union	Rowangchhari Upazila	39.7%
Ruma Union	Ruma Upazila	37.2%

=== Mrus ===
According to the 2022 census, Mru (Murong) are the third largest ethnic group in Bandarban District (10.69%).

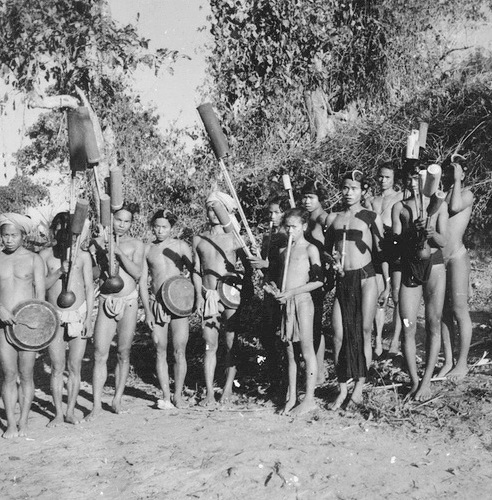
Tribal Mro people holding traditional pipes in their hands, Bandarban (1950)

By Upazila

Upazila	Population	Percentage of Mrus
Alikadam Upazila	15,168	23.77%
Thanchi Upazila	7,021	23.57%
Ruma Upazila	7,157	22.00%
Lama Upazila	10,781	7.72%
Bandarban Sadar Upazila	7,280	6.55%
Rowangchhari Upazila	1,685	6.08%
Naikhongchhari Upazila	2,356	3.08%

By Union (Highest 10)

Union	Upazila	Percentage
Kurukpata Union	Alikadam Upazila	79.4%
Tankabati Union	Bandarban Sadar Upazila	71.1%
Ghalangya Union	Ruma Upazila	66.24%
Thanchi Sadar Union	Thanchi Upazila	37.25%
Remakri Pransa Union	Ruma Upazila	25.55%
Tindu Union	Thanchi Upazila	23.62%
Gajalia Union	Lama Upazila	20.79%
Remakri Union	Thanchi Upazila	20.19%
Tarachha Union	Rowangchhari Upazila	19.87%
Rupshipara Union	Lama Upazila	17.18%

=== Tripura ===
According to the 2022 census, Tripuras are fourth largest ethnic group in Bandarban District (4.69%).

By Upazila

Upazila	Population	Percentage of Tripuras
Thanchi Upazila	6,336	21.27%
Ruma Upazila	2,913	8.95%
Rowangchhari Upazila	2,143	7.73%
Alikadam Upazila	3,452	5.41%
Lama Upazila	5,755	4.12%
Bandarban Sadar Upazila	1,771	1.59%
Naikhongchhari Upazila	202	0.26%

By Union (Highest 10)

Union	Upazila	Percentage
Tindu Union	Thanchi Upazila	30.7%
Remakri Union	Thanchi Upazila	25.6%
Remakri Pransa Union	Ruma Upazila	22.8%
Balipara Union	Thanchi Upazila	18.2%
Thanchi Sadar Union	Thanchi Upazila	14.7%
Gajalia Union	Lama Upazila	13.6%
Ghalangya Union	Ruma Upazila	13.1%
Alekkhyong Union	Rowangchhari Upazila	12.7%
Nowapatang Union	Rowangchhari Upazila	11.4%
Kurukpata Union	Alikadam Upazila	11.4%

=== Tanchangyas ===
According to the 2022 census, Tanchangyas are the fifth largest ethnic group in Bandarban District (3.09%).

They are the second largest ethnic group in Rowangchhari Upazila (14.39%).

Upazila	Population	Percentage of Tanchangyas
Rowangchhari Upazila	3,990	14.39%
Bandarban Sadar Upazila	5,605	5.05%
Naikhongchhari Upazila	2,881	3.77%
Alikadam Upazila	1,977	3.10%
Ruma Upazila	241	0.74%
Lama Upazila	183	0.13%
Thanchi Upazila	12	0.04%

=== Boms ===
According to the 2022 census, there are 12,311 Bom in CHT. Among them, 11854 (96.29%) Boms live in Bandarban District, constituting 2.46% of district's population.

They are third largest ethnic groups in Ruma Upazila (19.89%).

Upazila	Population	Percentage of Boms
Ruma Upazila	6,470	19.89%
Rowangchhari Upazila	1,882	6.79%
Bandarban Sadar Upazila	2,748	2.47%
Thanchi Upazila	685	2.30%
Lama Upazila	56	0.04%
Alikadam Upazila	8	0.01%
Naikhongchhari Upazila	5	0.01%

=== Chakmas ===
According to the 2022 census, there are 3,713 Chakma in Bandarban district.

Upazila	Population	Percentage of Chakmas
Bandarban Sadar Upazila	1,664	1.50%
Alikadam Upazila	574	0.90%
Thanchi Upazila	488	1.64%
Lama Upazila	355	0.25%
Ruma Upazila	305	0.94%
Rowangchhari Upazila	191	0.69%
Naikhongchhari Upazila	135	0.18%

=== Khumi ===
According to the 2022 census, there are 3,287 Khumis in Bandarban district.

Upazila	Population	Percentage of Khumis
Thanchi Upazila	1,829	6.14%
Ruma Upazila	890	2.74%
Rowangchhari Upazila	436	1.57%
Others	<100	

=== Chaks ===
According to the 2022 census, there are 2,662 Chaks in Bandarban district.

They are mainly concentrated in Naikhongchhari Upazila, constituting 3.05% of the upazila's population.

=== Khyangs ===
According to the 2022 census, there are 2502 Khyangs in Bandarban district.

Upazila	Population	Percentage of Khyangs
Bandarban Sadar Upazila	1,310	1.18%
Rowangchhari Upazila	652	2.35%
Thanchi Upazila	359	1.20%
Ruma Upazila	158	0.49%
Others	<100	

== Religion ==
Religion in the Bandarban District (2022)
1. Islam (52.7%)
2. Buddhism (29.5%)
3. Christianity (9.78%)
4. Hinduism (3.43%)
5. Other (4.52%)

Religion in present-day Bandarban District (Note: Bandarban, Ruma, Lama and Nakhyngchari thanas of Chittagong Hill Tracts district)
Religion	Population (1941)	Percentage (1941)	Population (2022)	Percentage (2022)
Tribal (Note: 'Tribal' was used as a blanket term for religious traditions of all tribes, and many of these tribes followed a more mainstream religion.)	57,793	94.50%	N/A	N/A
Islam	2,595	4.24%	253,756	52.74%
Buddhism	---	---	142,057	29.53%
Hinduism	369	0.60%	16,501	3.43%
Christianity	0	0.00%	47,054	9.78%
Others (Note: Including Jainism, Zoroastrianism, Judaism, Ad-Dharmis, or not stated)	399	0.65%	21,738	4.52%
Total Population	61,156	100%	481,106	100%

The religious composition of the population in 2022 was 52.74% Muslim, 29.53% Buddhist, 9.78% Christian, 3.43% Hindu and 4.52% others. Religious institutions is Mosque 2,070, Buddhist 1500 (256 temples, 644 pagodas), Hindu temple 194 and Church 2.

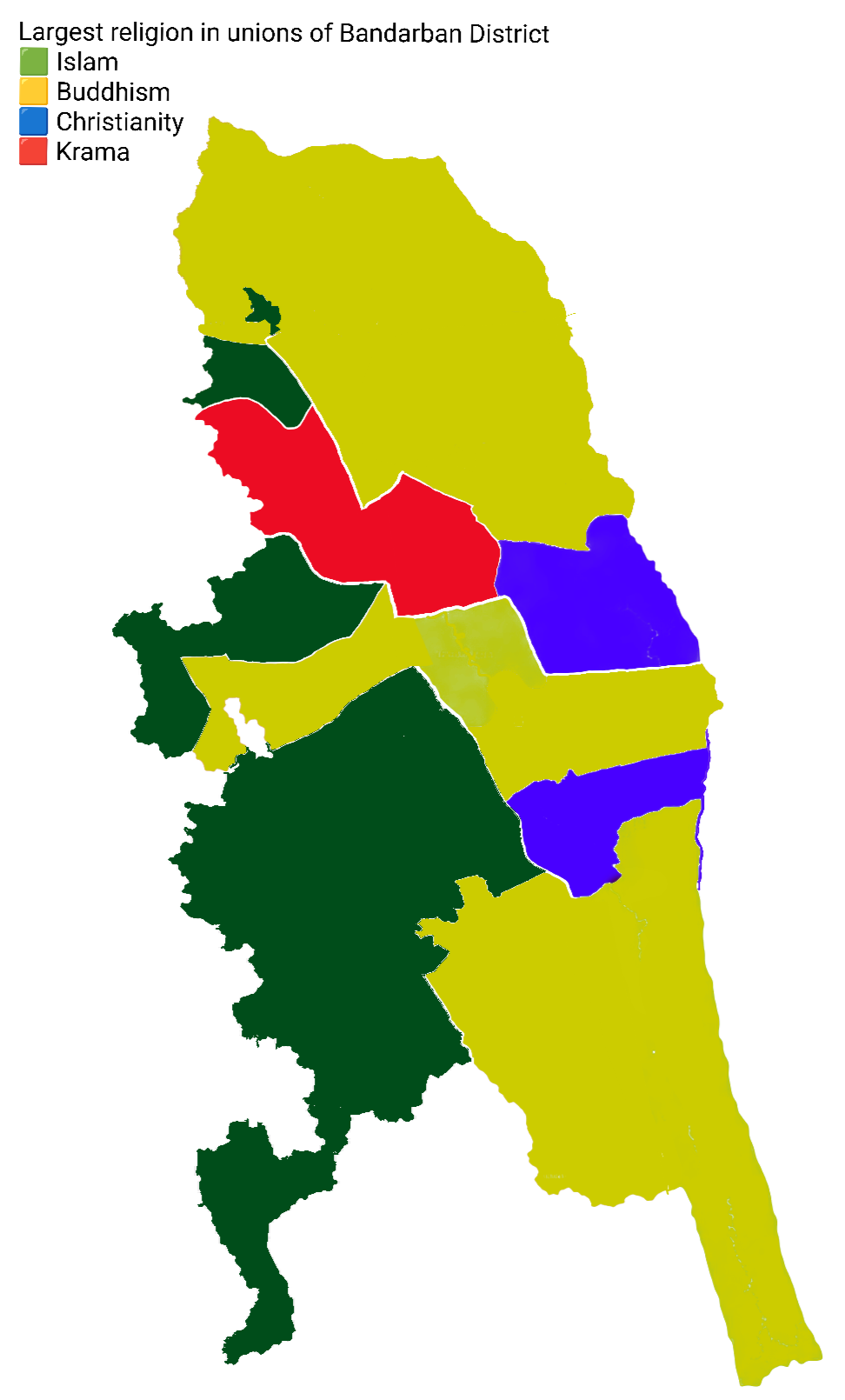
Largest religion by unions in Bandarban District

Population by religion in Union
Upazila	Union	Muslim	Buddhist	Christian	Hindu	Others
Sadar	Bandarban Paurashava	32,449	12,315	1,879	7,673	134
Sadar	Sadar	4,099	4,743	1,067	249	14
Sadar	Jamchhari	414	6,021	44	223	0
Sadar	Kuhalong	3,650	9,116	302	196	9
Sadar	Rajbila	1,825	4,481	117	37	0
Sadar	Sualak	7,268	2,976	1,390	2,94	1439
Sadar	Tankabati	1,142	884	1,674	49	2,923
Lama	Lama Paurashava	17,739	3,078	202	1,615	11
Lama	Aziznagar	11,438	665	371	223	12
Lama	Faitang	11,820	2,349	334	215	16
Lama	Fansiakhali	30,218	2,746	1,750	814	681
Lama	Gajalia	4,321	6,155	2,720	78	604
Lama	Lama	6,115	2,213	994	735	62
Lama	Rupshipara	8,285	4,968	439	18	806
Lama	Sarai	10,148	1,699	1,905	379	732
Alikadam	Alikadam	16,405	3,436	1,530	616	959
Alikadam	Chaikkhyong	11,732	5,016	1,049	152	17
Alikadam	Kurukpata	243	7,492	1,531	12	1,938
Alikadam	Nayapara	6,527	3,541	43	456	406
Naikhongchhari	Baishari	14,931	3,058	180	166	1
Naikhongchhari	Docchari	7,419	2,065	154	5	4
Naikhongchhari	Ghumdhum	13,530	4,017	3	156	1
Naikhongchhari	Naikhongchhari	21,073	2,039	11	211	9
Naikhongchhari	Sonaichhari	3,754	3,662	25	1	0
Rowangchhari	Alekkhyong	371	4,558	1,006	75	0
Rowangchhari	Nowapatang	83	3,687	774	10	0
Rowangchhari	Rowangchhari	426	5,859	2,305	94	1
Rowangchhari	Tarachha	1,301	4,629	857	31	1,653
Ruma	Ghalangya	20	1,528	1,680	8	3375
Ruma	Paindu	74	3,842	2,050	2	0
Ruma	Remakri Pransa	60	117	3,882	12	1,248
Ruma	Ruma	2,247	6,484	4,530	534	840
Thanchi	Balipara	810	3,783	1,541	244	119
Thanchi	Remakri	450	3,280	2,940	22	1456
Thanchi	Thanchi	1273	4,081	2,636	195	1650
Thanchi	Tindu	89	1,470	3,139	2	610

Largest Religion in Union and Municipality
Religion	Union	Municipality	Upazila
Muslim	15	2	4
Buddhist	15	0	2
Christian	2	0	1
Krama	2	0	0
Total	34	2	7

=== Islam ===
According to 2022 census, Islam is the largest religion in Bandarban District (52.74%). By Upazila

Upazila	Population	Percentage of Islam
Naikhongchhari Upazila	60,709	79.38%
Lama Upazila	100,088	71.65%
Alikadam Upazila	34,908	54.71%
Bandarban Sadar Upazila	50,847	45.77%
Thanchi Upazila	2,622	8.80%
Rowangchhari Upazila	2,181	7.87%
Ruma Upazila	2,401	7.38%

By Union (Highest 10)

Union	Upazila	Percentage
Naikhongchhari Sadar Union	Naikhongchhari Upazila	90.3%
Aziznagar Union	Lama Upazila	90.0%
Fansiakhali Union	Lama Upazila	83.5%
Baishari Union	Naikhongchhari Upazila	81.4%
Faitang Union	Lama Upazila	80.2%
Dochhari Union	Naikhongchhari Upazila	76.9%
Ghumdhum Union	Naikhongchhari Upazila	76.4%
Alikadam Union	Alikadam Upazila	69.8%
Sarai Union	Lama Upazila	68.3%
Chaikkhyong Union	Alikadam Upazila	64.7%

=== Buddhism ===
According to 2022 census, Buddhism is the second largest in Bandarban District (29.53%).

By Upazila

Upazila	Population	Percentage of Buddhism
Rowangchhari Upazila	18,734	67.58%
Thanchi Upazila	12,614	42.34%
Ruma Upazila	11,971	36.80%
Bandarban Sadar Upazila	40,536	36.49%
Alikadam Upazila	19,485	30.54%
Naikhongchhari Upazila	14,841	19.41%
Lama Upazila	23,876	17.09%

By Union (Highest 10)

Union	Upazila	Percentage
Jamchhari Union	Bandarban Sadar Upazila	89.8%
Nowapatang Union	Rowangchhari Upazila	81%
Alekkhyong Union	Rowangchhari Upazila	75.8%
Rajbila Union	Bandarban Sadar Upazila	69.4%
Kuhalong Union	Bandarban Sadar Upazila	68.7%
Rowangchhari Union	Rowangchhari Upazila	67.5%
Kurukpata Union	Alikadam Upazila	66.8%
Paindu Union	Ruma Upazila	64.4%
Balipara Union	Thanchi Upazila	58.2%
Tarachha Union	Rowangchhari Upazila	54.6%

=== Christianity ===
According to 2022 census, Christianity is third largest religion in Bandarban district (9.78%).

By Upazila

Upazila	Population	Percentage of Christianity
Ruma Upazila	12,142	37.32%
Thanchi Upazila	10,256	34.43%
Rowangchhari Upazila	4,942	17.83%
Alikadam Upazila	4,153	6.51%
Lama Upazila	8,715	6.24%
Bandarban Sadar Upazila	6,473	5.83%
Naikhongchhari Upazila	373	0.49%

By Union (Highest 10)

Union	Upazila	Percentage
Remakri Pransa Union	Ruma Upazila	72.98%
Tindu Union	Thanchi Upazila	59.11%
Remakri Union	Thanchi Upazila	36.08%
Paindu Union	Ruma Upazila	34.35%
Ruma Sadar Union	Ruma Upazila	30.95%
Rowangchhari Sadar Union	Rowangchhari Upazila	26.54%
Thanchi Sadar Union	Thanchi Upazila	26.8%
Ghalangya Union	Ruma Upazila	25.41%
Tankabati Union	Bandarban Sadar Upazila	25.09%
Balipara Union	Thanchi Upazila	23.7%

=== Hinduism ===
According to 2022 census, Hinduism is the fourth largest in Bandarban district (3.43%).

Upazila	Population	Percentage of Hinduism
Bandarban Sadar Upazila	8,721	7.85%
Alikadam Upazila	1,934	3.03%
Lama Upazila	4,078	2.92%
Ruma Upazila	556	1.71%
Thanchi Upazila	463	1.55%
Rowangchhari Upazila	210	0.76%
Naikhongchhari Upazila	539	0.70%

== Subdistricts ==
Bandarban District upazila geocode map

- Alikadam Upazila
- Bandarban Sadar Upazila
- Lama Upazila
- Naikhongchhari Upazila
- Rowangchhari Upazila
- Ruma Upazila
- Thanchi Upazila

== Tourism ==
The India – Myanmar Sabroom – Cox's Bazar railway link has been proposed to connect Sabroom – Khargachari – Rangamati – Bandarban – Satkania – Cox's Bazar and another rail link connecting Bandarban to Tuipang, India.

Bandarban lies, by bus, eight hours away from Dhaka, two hours from Chittagong and three hours from Cox's Bazar. It is also possible to get there by a six-hour bus ride from Rangamati. The Buddha Dhatu Jadi, the Buddhist temple in Bangladesh, located in Balaghata, 4 km from the town. This place attracts many tourists every year. This Theravada Buddhist temple is made completely in the style of South-East Asia and houses the second largest statue of the Buddha in Bangladesh. The waterfall named Shoilo Propat at Milanchari is another place tourists like to visit. The numerous Buddhist temples, known as kyang in local tongue, and bhihars in the town include the highly notable the Rajvihar (royal vihar) at Jadipara and the Ujanipara Bhihar. Bawm villages around Chimbuk, and Mru villages a little further off, are also lie within a day's journey from the town. Debotakhum, Prantik Lake, Jibannagar and Kyachlong Lake are some more places of interest. Boat ride on the river Shangu is one of the main attractions here for tourists.

Starting on January 7, 2015 the Home Ministry has enforced the provision of "no free passes" for foreigners visiting the three Chittagong Hill Tracts districts – Rangamati, Khagrachhari and Bandarban. As a result, foreigners need to submit an application to the Home Ministry a month ahead for their scheduled visit.

== Notable persons ==
- Jafar Iqbal
- Bir Bahadur Ushwaye Sing
- UK Ching
- Nathan Bom
- Maung Shwe Prue Chowdhury
- Aung Shwe Prue Chowdhury
- Saching Prue Jerry
- Ma Mya Ching
- Mong Prue Sain

== See also ==
- Upazilas of Bangladesh
- Districts of Bangladesh
- Divisions of Bangladesh
- Upazila
- Thana
