= Krama Religion =

Tribal religion in Bangladesh

- Krama
- Region: Bandarban District
- Language: Mru language
- Founder: Menlay Mro
- Origin: c. 1982 CE; Bandarban
- Separations: Animism
- Number of followers: est. 21,000

Krama Religion is an indigenous faith of the Mru people, originating in Bandarban District.

Menlay Mro, founder of Krama Religion, was born in 1965 to jhum cultivator parents Mensingh Mro and Tumte Mro of Pora Paara village at the foot of hill Chimbuk, Bandarban District. It is a monotheistic religion centered around deity called Thorai. Their sacred scripture is Riyung Khiti.
