= List of ethnic minority officials in Bangladesh =

This list comprises persons who belong to an ethnic minority group who have been elected as members of the Jatiya Sangsad and other positions within the Government of Bangladesh.

== Members of Parliament ==
Party	Portrait	Name	Constituency	Year elected	Year left	Ethnicity
PCJSS		Manabendra Narayan Larma	Chittagong Hill Tracts-1	1973	1976	Chakma
JSD		Upendra Lal Chakma	Chittagong Hill Tracts-1	1979	1982	Chakma
PCJSS		Chaithoai Roaza	Chittagong Hill Tracts-2	1973	1976	Marma
BNP		Raja Aung Shwe Prue Chowdhury	Chittagong Hill Tracts-2	1979	1982	Marma
BNP		Raja Aung Shwe Prue Chowdhury	Bandarban	1986	1991	Marma
JP(E)		Binoy Kumar Dewan	Rangamati	1986	1991	Chakma
AL		Dipankar Talukdar	Rangamati	1991	February 1996	Jumma
AL		Dipankar Talukdar	Rangamati	June 1996	2001	Jumma
AL		Dipankar Talukdar	Rangamati	2008	2014	Jumma
AL		Dipankar Talukdar	Rangamati	2018	2024	Jumma
BNP		Parijat Kusum Chakma	Rangamati	February 1996	June 1996	Chakma
BNP		Moni Swapan Dewan	Rangamati	2001	2008	Chakma
PCJSS		Ushatan Talukder	Rangamati	2014	2018	Chakma
BNP		Dipen Dewan	Rangamati	2026	present	Chakma
AL		Bir Bahadur Ushwe Sing	Bandarban	1991	February 1996	Marma
AL		Bir Bahadur Ushwe Sing	Bandarban	June 1996	2024	Marma
BNP		Saching Prue Jerry	Bandarban	February 1996	June 1996	Marma
BNP		Saching Prue Jerry	Bandarban	2026	present	
AL		Kalparanjan Chakma	Khagrachhari	1991	February 1996	Chakma
AL		Kalparanjan Chakma	Khagrachhari	June 1996	2001	Chakma
AL		Jotindra Lal Tripura	Khagrachhari	2008	2014	Tripuri
AL		Kujendra Lal Tripura	Khagrachhari	2014	2024	Tripuri
BNP		Ma Mya Ching	Reserved Women's Seat-30	1991	June 1996	Marma
BNP		Aye Thein Rakhaine	Reserved Women's Seat-30	June 1996	2001	Marma
AL		Ethinab Rakhain	Reserved Women's Seat-7	2008	2014	Marma
AL		Basanti Chakma	Reserved Women's Seat-9	2018	2024	Chakma
AL		Promode Mankin	Mymensingh-1	1991	1996	Garo
AL		Promode Mankin	Mymensingh-1	2001	11 May 2016	Garo
AL		Jewel Areng	Mymensingh-1	11 May 2016	present	Garo
AL		Jarati Tanchangya	Reserved Women's Seat-48	2024	2024	Tanchangya

== Supreme Court ==
Portrait	Name	Office	Year elected	Year left	Ethnicity
	Surendra Kumar Sinha	Chief Justice of Bangladesh	17 January 2015	11 November 2017	Bishnupriya Manipuri
	Bhabani Prasad Singha	Justice of the High Court Division	12 December 2010	July 2020	Bishnupriya Manipuri

== Government ministries ==
Portrait	Name	Office	Year appointed	Year left	Ethnicity
	Kalparanjan Chakma	Minister of Chittagong Hill Tracts Affairs	1 January 1998	15 July 2001	Chakma
	Moni Swapan Dewan	Minister of State for Chittagong Hill Tracts Affairs	10 October 2001	29 October 2006	Chakma
	Bir Bahadur Ushwe Sing	Minister of Chittagong Hill Tracts Affairs	7 January 2019	11 January 2024	Marma
	Bir Bahadur Ushwe Sing	Chairman of the Chittagong Hill Tracts Development Board	1996	2002	Marma
	Bir Bahadur Ushwe Sing	State Minister of Chittagong Hill Tracts Affairs	12 January 2014	7 January 2019	Marma
	Dipankar Talukdar	State Minister of Chittagong Hill Tracts Affairs	6 January 2009	12 January 2014	Jumma
	Kujendra Lal Tripura	State Minister of Chittagong Hill Tracts Affairs	11 January 2024	5 August 2024	Tripuri
	Raja Devasish Roy Wangza	Interim Adviser for Ministry of Environment, Forest and Climate Change	15 January 2008	6 January 2009	Chakma
	Raja Devasish Roy Wangza	Interim Adviser for Chittagong Hill Tracts Affairs	29 October 2006	29 December 2008	Chakma
	Supradip Chakma	Interim Adviser for Chittagong Hill Tracts Affairs	11 August 2024	17 February 2026	Chakma
	Dipen Dewan	Minister of Chittagong Hill Tracts Affairs	17 February 2026	Present	Chakma
	Naba Bikram Kishore Tripura	Chairman of the Chittagong Hill Tracts Development Board	December 2013	April 2021	Tripuri
	Naba Bikram Kishore Tripura	Secretary of the Ministry of Chittagong Hill Tracts Affairs	16 June 2011	18 February 2018	Tripuri
	Jyotirindra Bodhipriya Larma	Chairman of the Chittagong Hill Tracts Regional Council	Present	Present	Marma
	Abdur Rahman Kashgari	Khatib of the Baitul Mukarram National Mosque (Ministry of Religious Affairs)	1963	March 1971	Uyghur
	Amimul Ehsan Barkati	Khatib of the Baitul Mukarram National Mosque (Ministry of Religious Affairs)	March 1971	27 October 1974	Bihari
	Promode Mankin	State Minister of Cultural Affairs	31 July 2009	14 September 2012	Garo
	Dilip Barua	Minister of Industries	5 January 2009	21 November 2013	Barua
	Benita Roy	Land Administration and Land Reforms	December 1975	January 1976	Chakma
	Benita Roy	Minister of Relief and Rehabilitation	February 1976	June 1978	Chakma
	Raja Mong Prue Sain Chowdhury	Governor of Khagrachhari Hill District	24 February 1975	30 August 1975	Marma
	Raja Maung Shwe Prue Chowdhury	Governor of Bandarban Hill District	24 February 1975	30 August 1975	Marma

== Tribal chiefs ==
Portrait	Name	Office	Year appointed	Year left	Ethnicity
	Raja Kumar Samit Roy	Chief of the Chakma Circle	1972	25 December 1977	Chakma
	Raja Devasish Roy Wangza	Chief of the Chakma Circle	25 December 1977	Present	Chakma
	Raja Maung Shwe Prue Chowdhury	Chief of the Bohmong Circle	1975	19 November 1998	Marma
	Raja Aung Shwe Prue Chowdhury	Chief of the Bohmong Circle	19 November 1998	1 August 2012	Marma
	Raja Kya Sain Prue Chowdhury	Chief of the Bohmong Circle	1 August 2012	6 February 2023	Marma
	Raja U Shwe Prue Chowdhury	Chief of the Bohmong Circle	10 April 2023	Present	Marma
	Raja Mong Prue Sain Chowdhury	Chief of the Mong Circle	26 March 1971	1984	Marma
	Raja Paihala Prue Chowdhury	Chief of the Mong Circle	1984	22 October 2008	Marma
	Raja Saching Prue Chowdhury	Chief of the Mong Circle	16 January 2009	Present	Marma
