= Buddhism in Bangladesh =

Bangladeshi Buddhists Bāṅlādēśī Bouddhô বাংলাদেশী বৌদ্ধ

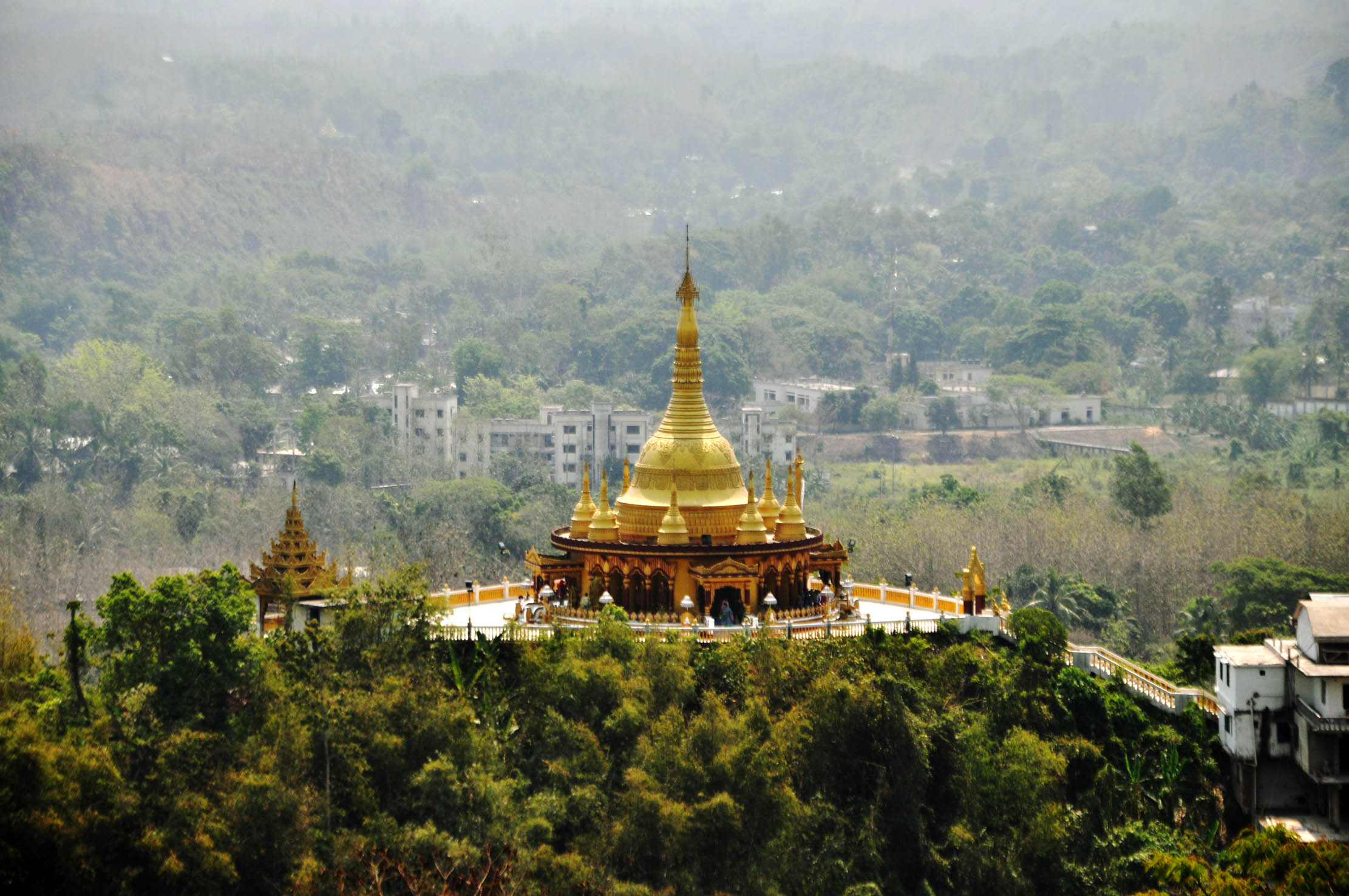
- Bandarban Golden Temple

Total population
- Around 1,001,974 ▲ (0.63% of the country's population) ▲

Regions with significant populations
- Chittagong Hill Tracts; Cox Bazar; Chittagong; Dhaka; Barishal
- Chittagong Division: 969,630 (2.92%)
- Dhaka Division: 20,335 (0.046%)
- Barisal Division: 4,911 (0.054%)
- Rangpur Division: 3,091 (0.0176%)
- Rajshahi Division: 1,123 (0.0055%)
- Sylhet Division: 1,105 (0.010%)
- Khulna Division: 1,006 (0.0058%)
- Mymensingh Division: 753 (0.0062%)

Religions
- Buddhism

Languages
- Bengali, Chittagonian, Chakma, Pali, Marma

Buddhism is the third-largest religious affiliation and formed about 0.63% of the population of Bangladesh. It is said that Buddha once in his life came to this region of East Bengal to spread his teachings and he was successful in converting the local people to Buddhism, specially in the Chittagong Division and later on Pala empire propagated and patronized Buddhist religion throughout the Bengal territory.

About 1 million people in Bangladesh adhere to the Theravada school of Buddhism, while a smaller portion are Mahayana Buddhists. Vajrayana Buddhism was once more prevalent in Bangladesh, but its following has now declined to almost none. Over 65% of the Buddhist population is concentrated in the Chittagong Hill Tracts region, where it is the predominant faith of the Rakhine, Chakma, Marma, Tanchangya, Jumma people and the Barua. The remaining 35% are Bengali Buddhists. Buddhist communities are also present in the urban centers of Bangladesh, particularly Chittagong and Dhaka.

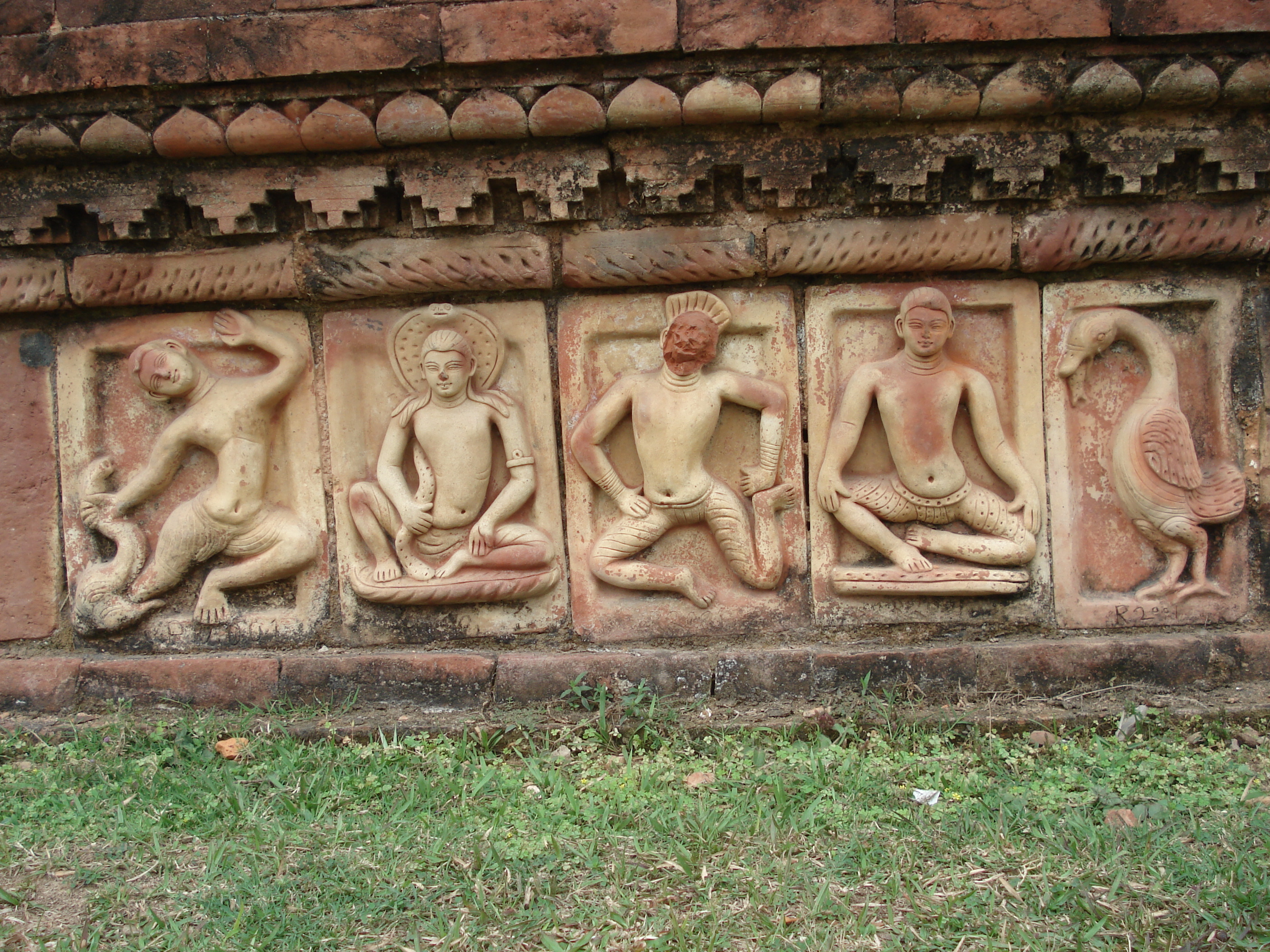
The Somapura Mahavihara is the oldest Buddhist institution in Bangladesh.

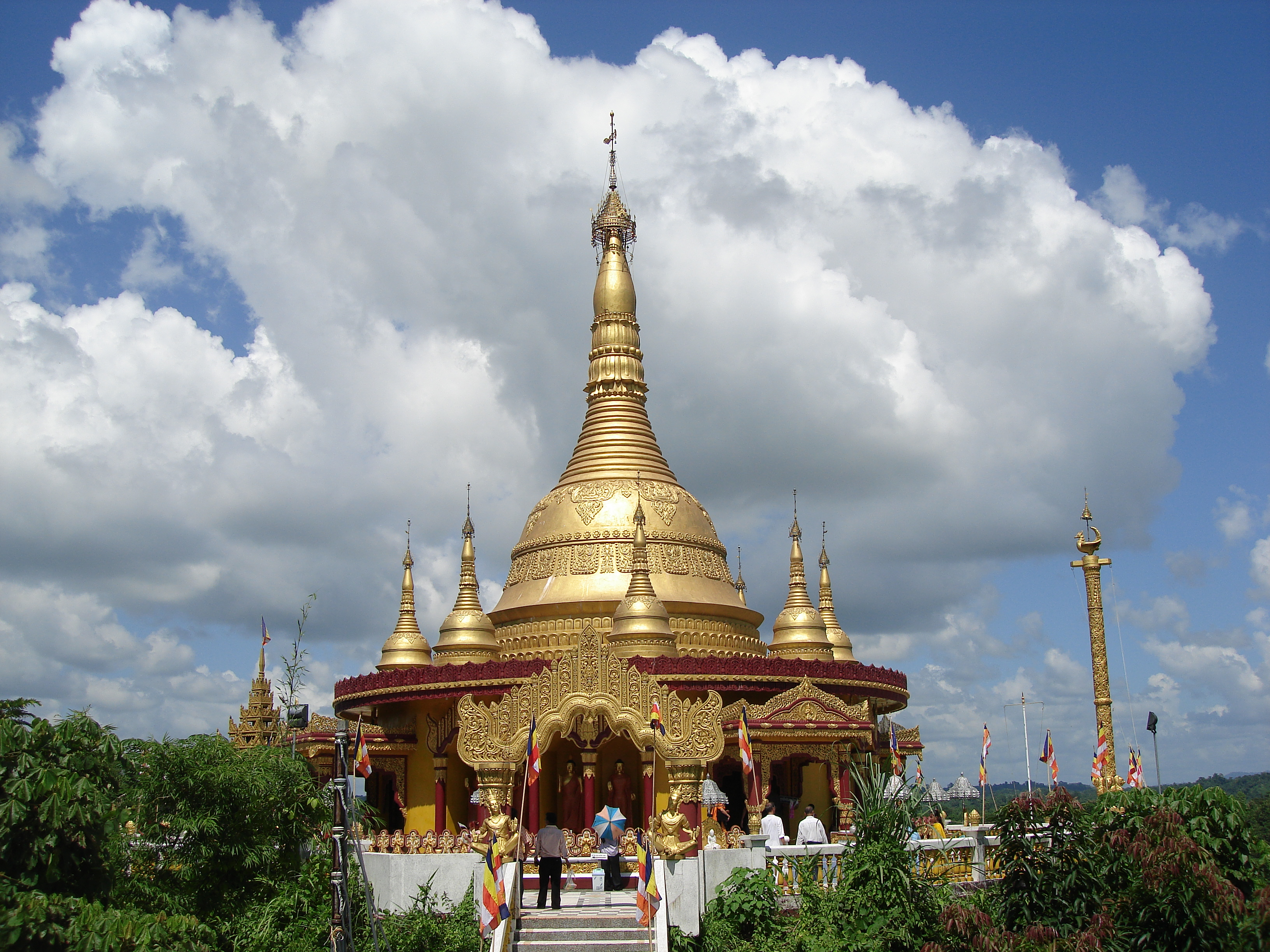
Buddha Dhatu Zadi, a Buddhist temple in Bandarban

== History ==
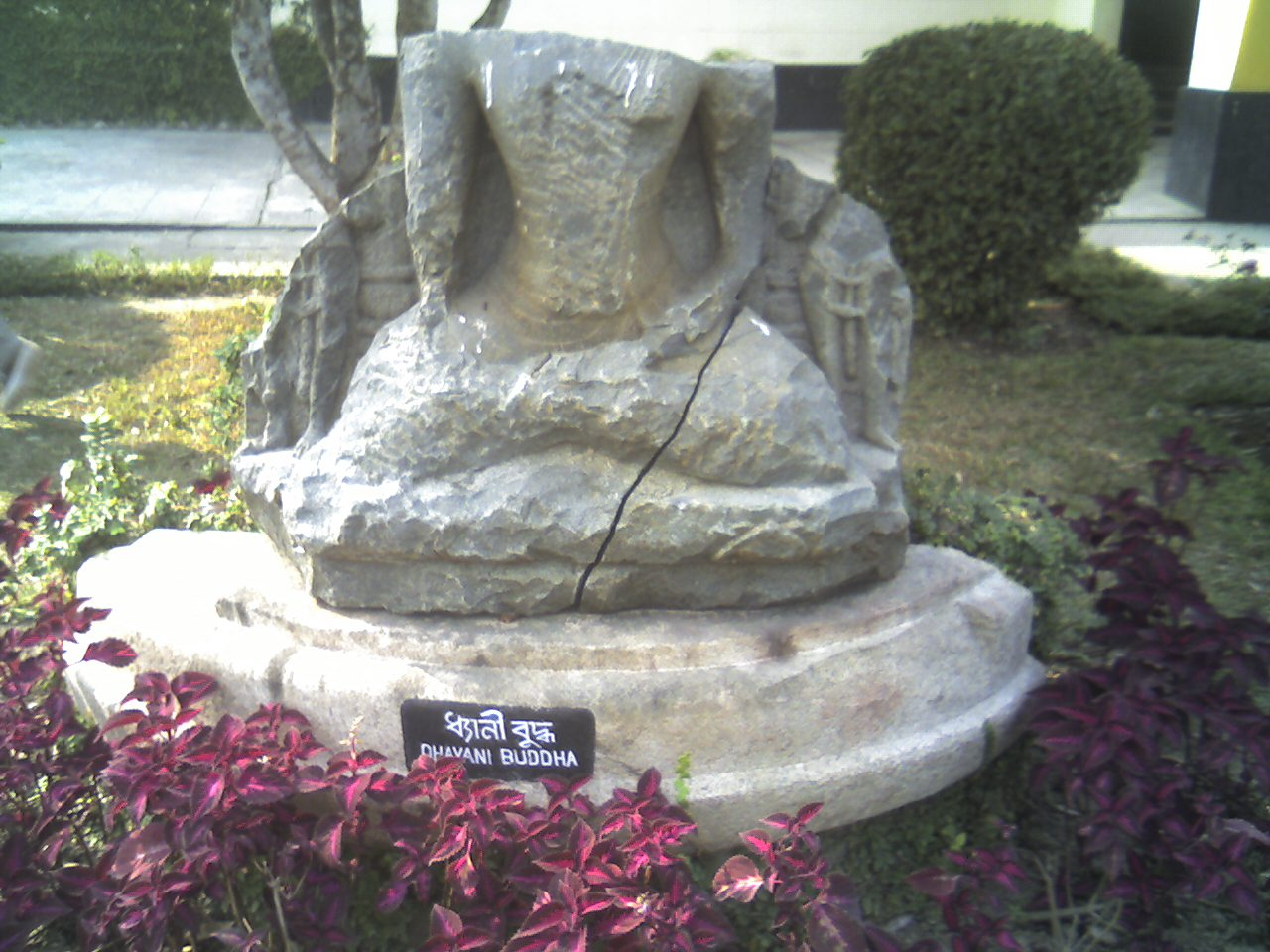
The earliest statue of Buddha found in Mahasthangarh

Legend said that Gautama Buddha came to the region to spread Buddhism, and it was speculated that one or two individuals became monks to follow in his footsteps. However, Buddhism did not gain much support until the reign of Ashoka when Buddhism gained a toehold. The Pala Empire that controlled the Indian subcontinent spread many Buddhist ideologies in modern Bangladesh and built many monasteries such as the Mahasthangarh and the Somapura Mahavihara. During the Pala Dynasty, a famous teacher named Atisha was born in the city of Bikrampur and spread Mahayana Buddhism.

Chandra Dynasty's Puranchandra and Subarnachandra adopted Buddhism, as did their successors Trailokyachandra and Srichandra who ruled Harikel and Chandradwip (Barisal). The Khadga Dynasty was a Buddhist dynasty of kings that carried the surname Bhatt. They made several temples and monasteries. King Rajabhata was for example a very committed Mahayanist Buddhist.

Buddhism in various forms appears to have been prevalent at the time of the Turkic conquest in 1202. The invading armies found numerous monasteries, which they destroyed. With the destruction of centres of Buddhist learning, such as Nalanda University, Buddhism rapidly disintegrated. In subsequent centuries and up through the 1980s nearly all the remaining Buddhists lived in the region around Chittagong, which had not been entirely conquered until the time of the British Raj (1858–1947). During the 19th century, a revival movement developed that led to the development of two orders of Theravada monks, the Sangharaj Nikaya and the Mahasthabir Nikaya.

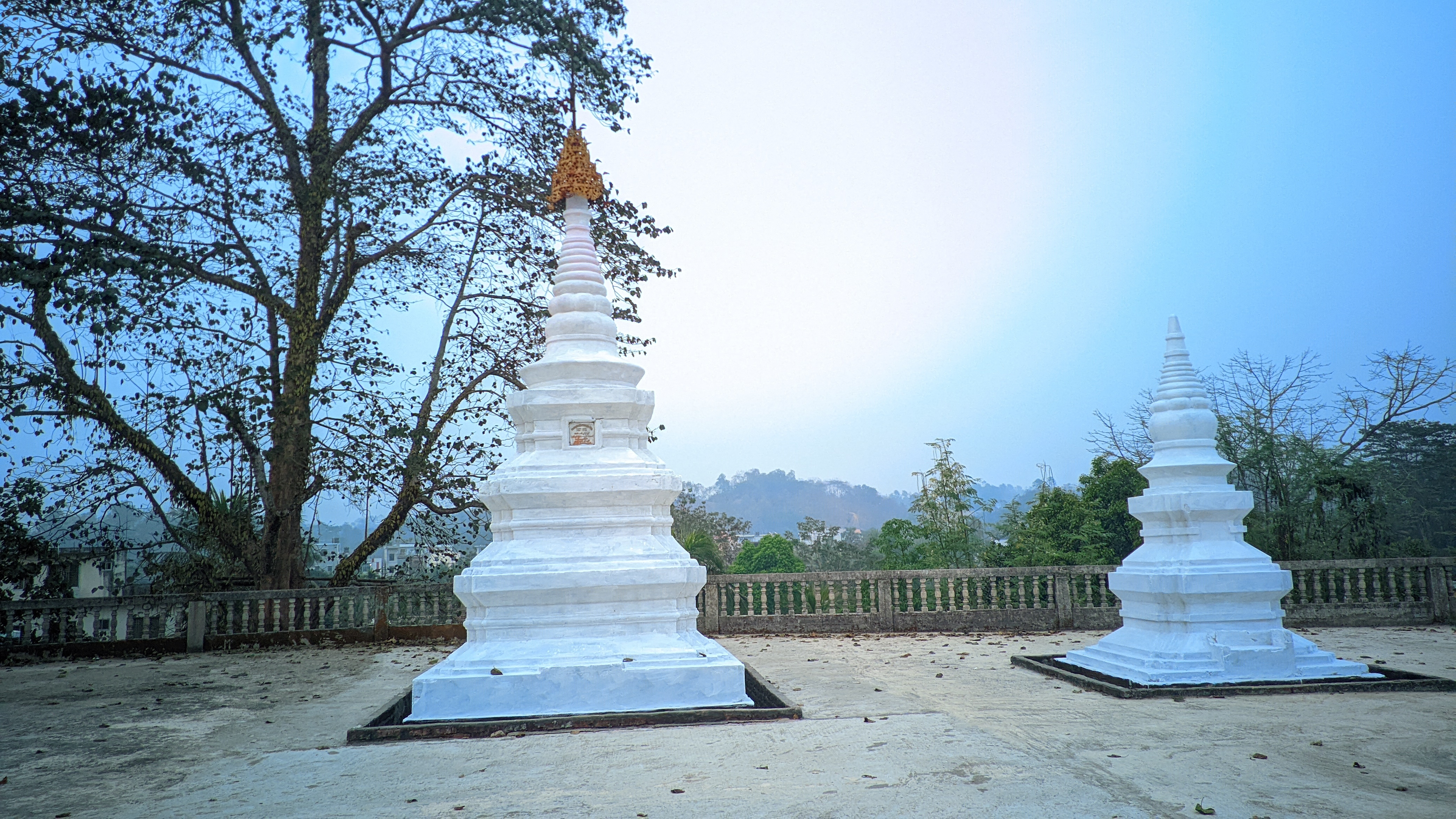
Buddhist stupa in Bandarban

In the Chittagong Hills, Buddhist tribes formed the majority of the population, and their religion appeared to be a mixture of tribal beliefs and Buddhist doctrines. According to the 1981 census, there were approximately 538,000 Buddhists in Bangladesh, representing less than 1 percent of the population.

== Demographic overview ==
Historical Buddhist Population
Year	Pop.	±%
1951	294,437	—
1961	355,634	+20.8%
1974	428,871	+20.6%
1981	522,722	+21.9%
1991	637,893	+22.0%
2001	862,063	+35.1%
2011	898,634	+4.2%
2022	1,001,974	+11.5%
Source: Bangladesh government census authority

Buddhism in Bangladesh by decades
Year	Percent	Increase
1951	0.7%	
1961	0.7%	0%
1974	0.6%	▼ -0.1%
1981	0.6%	0%
1991	0.6%	0%
2001	0.7%	▲ +0.1%
2011	0.6%	▼ -0.1%
2022	0.63%	▲ +0.03%

As of 2014, followers of Buddhism are mainly people of the Barua community living in Chittagong city, the business city of Bangladesh and indigenous Arakanese descent living in the sub-tropical Chittagong Hill Tracts. People who follow Buddhism in Bangladesh belong to the Barua people in majority with the percentage of 65% among the 0.07% population of Bangladesh, Chakma, Chak, Marma, Tanchangya and the Khyang, who had been since time immemorial have practiced Buddhism. Other tribes, notably those who practice Animism, have come under some Buddhist influence, and this is true in the case of the Khumi and the Mru, and to a lesser extent on the other tribes.

Buddhist population across Bangladesh
Division	Percentage (%)	Buddhist population	Total population
Barisal	0.05%	4,911	9,100,104
Chittagong	2.92%	969,630	33,202,357
Dhaka	0.05%	20,335	44,215,759
Khulna	0.01%	1,006	17,415,924
Rajshahi	0.01%	1,123	20,353,116
Rangpur	0.02%	3,091	17,610,955
Sylhet	0.01%	1,105	11,034,952
Mymensingh	0.01%	753	12,225,449

== Geographical distribution ==
According to 2022 census, there are 1,001,974 Buddhist in Bangladesh. Among them, 370,793 in Rangamati District, 256,600 in Khagrachhari District, 149,775 in Chattogram District, 142,057 in Bandarban District, 42,305 in Cox's Bazar District and 40,444 in other districts. So, Greater Chittagong is home to 95.97% Bangladeshi Buddhist.

Buddhist population distribution in Bangladesh
1. Rangamati District (37.0%)
2. Khagrachhari District (25.6%)
3. Chattogram District (14.9%)
4. Bandarban District (14.2%)
5. Cox's Bazar District (4.22%)
6. Other Districts (4.03%)

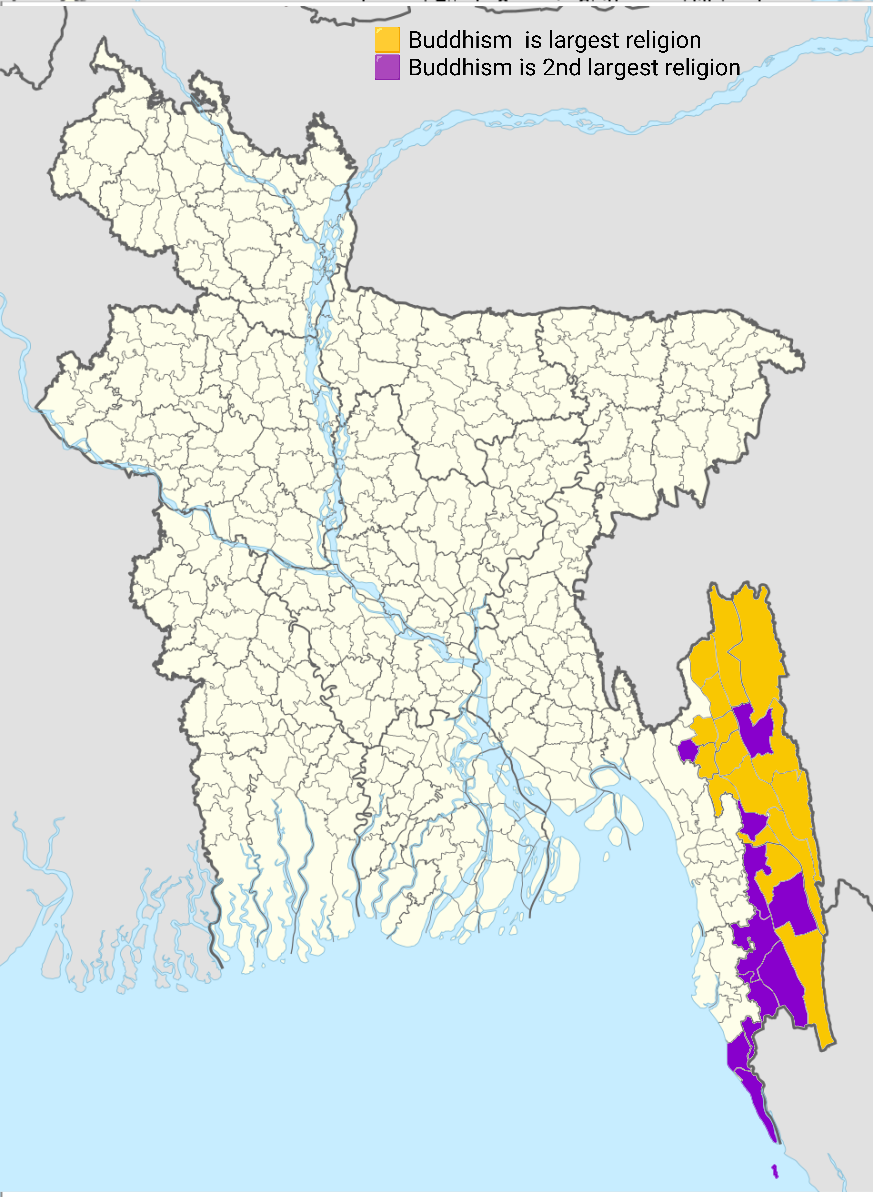
Buddhism in Bangladesh

Upazila	District	Percentage of Buddhism
Juraichhari Upazila	Rangamati Hill District	95.60%
Naniarchar Upazila	Rangamati Hill District	83.18%
Belaichhari Upazila	Rangamati Hill District	78.21%
Lakshmichhari Upazila,	Khagrachhari District	77.73%
Barkal Upazila	Rangamati Hill District	75.81%
Bagaichhari Upazila	Rangamati Hill District	67.99%
Rowangchhari Upazila	Bandarban District	67.58%
Mahalchhari Upazila	Khagrachhari District	61.67%
Rajasthali Upazila	Rangamati Hill District	58.48%
Kaukhali Upazila	Rangamati Hill District	56.76%
Dighinala Upazila	Khagrachhari District	54.54%
Rangamati Sadar Upazila	Rangamati Hill District	48.50%
Panchhari Upazila	Khagrachhari District	47.25%
Guimara Upazila	Khagrachhari District	46.74%
Kaptai Upazila	Rangamati Hill District	45.35%
Thanchi Upazila	Bandarban District	42.34%
Khagrachhari Sadar Upazila	Khagrachhari District	38.50%
Ruma Upazila	Bandarban District	36.80%
Bandarban Sadar Upazila	Bandarban District	36.49%
Alikadam Upazila	Bandarban District	30.54%
Langadu Upazila	Rangamati Hill District	23.74%
Manikchhari Upazila	Khagrachhari District	21.50%
Naikhongchhari Upazila	Bandarban District	19.41%
Lama Upazila	Bandarban District	17.09%
Ramgarh Upazila	Khagrachhari District	14.63%
Raozan Upazila	Chattogram District	6.71%
Matiranga Upazila	Khagrachhari District	5.58%
Ukhia Upazila	Cox's Bazar District	4.99%
Rangunia Upazila	Chattogram District	4.23%
Ramu Upazila	Cox's Bazar District	2.95%
Taltali Upazila	Barguna District	2.54%
Lohagara Upazila	Chattogram District	1.83%
Chandanaish Upazila	Chattogram District	1.81%
Patiya Upazila	Chattogram District	1.74%
Cox's Bazar Sadar Upazila	Cox's Bazar District	1.70%
Boalkhali Upazila	Chattogram District	1.66%
Fatikchhari Upazila	Chattogram District	1.35%
Teknaf Upazila	Cox's Bazar District	1.34%
Mirsarai Upazila	Chattogram District	1.24%
Hathazari Upazila	Chattogram District	1.13%
Others		<1%

== Buddhist sites ==
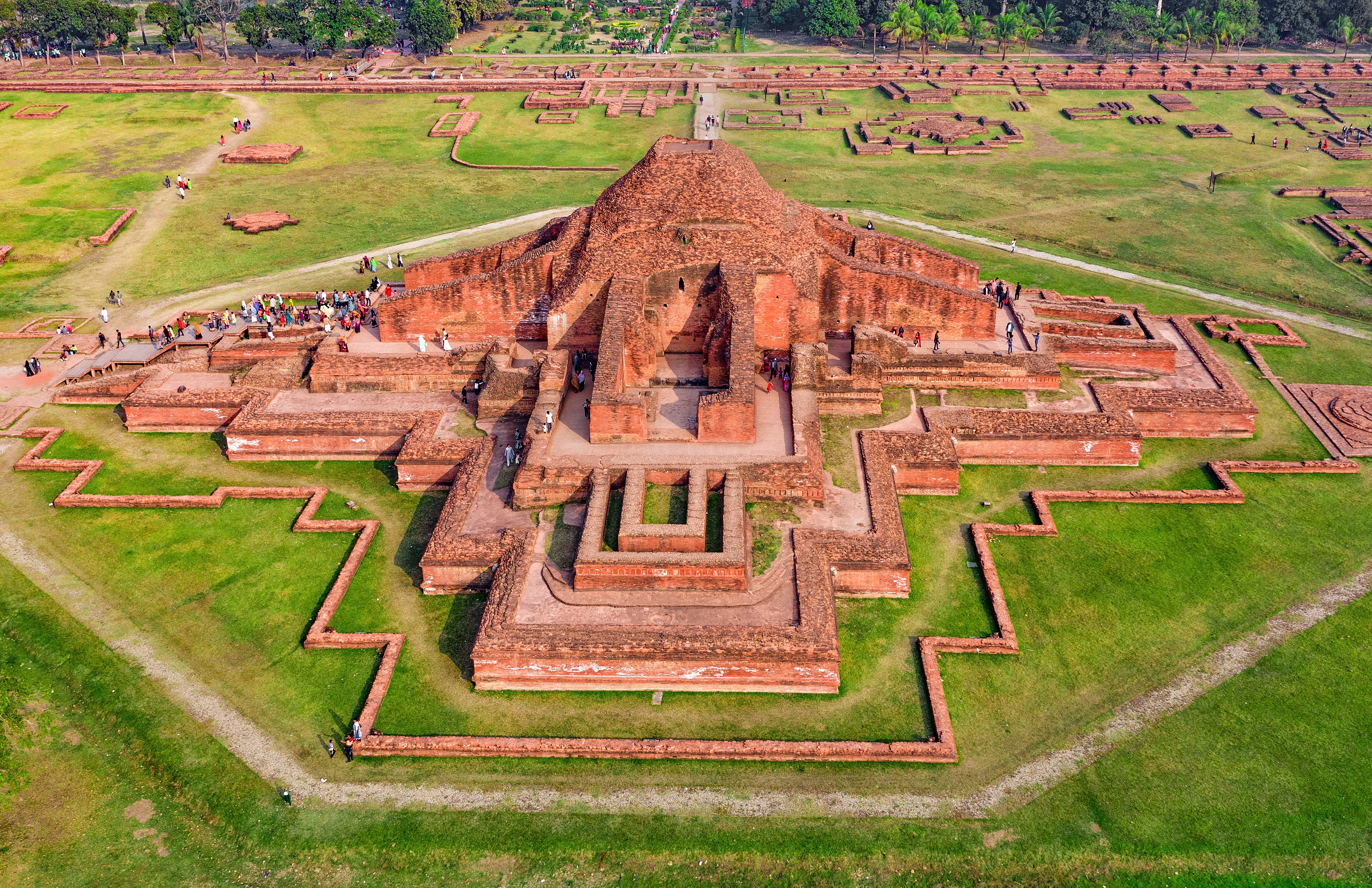
Somapura Buddhist Vihar dates back to the 8th century AD during the rule of the Pala empire

- Somapura Mahavihara in Naogaon, Rajshahi Division was built during the Pala-era and was part of a network of monasteries including Nalanda, Vikramashila and Jaggadala. It is a UNESCO World Heritage Site.
- Jagaddala Mahavihara in Naogaon, Rajshahi was an 11th-century Buddhist monastic establishment located in the historical Varendra region. Was probably active till at least the 12th century.
- Halud Vihara in Naogaon, Rajshahi
- Agrapuri Vihara in Naogaon, Rajshahi
- Vasu Vihara in Bogra, Rajshahi
- Sitakot Vihara in Nawabganj, Rangpur Division.
- Bhitagarh in Panchagarh District, Rangpur Division.
- Pandit Vihara in Chittagong
- Bikrampur Vihara in Bikrampur, Dhaka Division.
- Shalban Vihara in Cumilla
- Wari-Bateshwar ruins in Narsingdi, Dhaka Division.
- Nateshwar Deul, in Munshiganj, Dhaka Division

== Culture ==
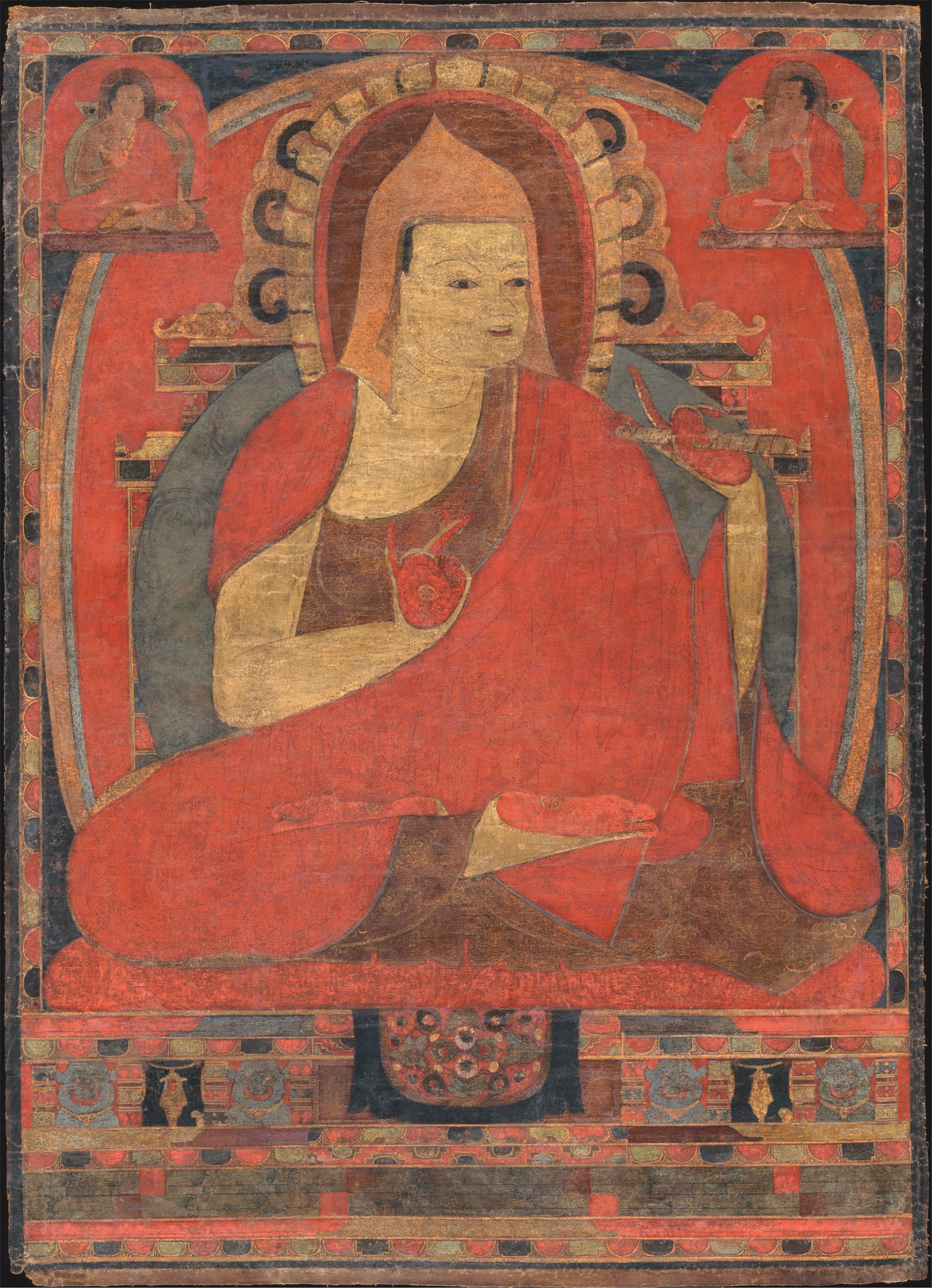
Atisha is one of the ancient priests from the Pala dynasty who is followed within the Bangladeshi Buddhist sects.

There are several active monasteries in the Chittagong, and in most Buddhist villages there is a school (kyong) where boys live and learn to read Bengali (national language) and some Pali (an ancient Buddhist scriptural language). It is common for men who have finished their schooling to return at regular intervals for periods of residence in the school. The local Buddhist shrine is often an important center of village life.

Buddhism outside the monastic retreats has absorbed and adapted indigenous popular creeds and beliefs of the regions to which it has spread. In most areas religious ritual focuses on the image of the Buddha, and the major festivals observed by Buddhists in Bangladesh commemorate the important events of his life. Although doctrinal Buddhism rejects the worship of gods and preserves the memory of the Buddha as an enlightened man, popular Buddhism contains a pantheon of gods and lesser deities headed by the Buddha.

The Ministry of Religious Affairs provides assistance for the maintenance of Buddhist places of worship and relics. The ancient monasteries at Paharpur (in Rajshahi Region) and Mainamati (in Cumilla Region), dating from the seventh to ninth century A.D., are considered unique for their size and setting and are maintained as state-protected monuments.

== Persecution of Buddhists ==
List of massacres targeted at Buddhists minorities by Bengali nationalists, Awami League activists and communal mobs:

- 1971 Bangladesh genocide
- 2012 Ramu violence
- Riots against indigenous Buddhist minorities
- Persecution of Buddhists in Bangladesh

== Prominent Bangladeshi Buddhists ==
Historical figures

- Atisa - 10th century Buddhist monk who played a prominent role in the spread of Buddhism to Tibet. Also an abbot at Vikramashila monastery.
- Chandragomin - 7th century Buddhist lay practitioner and poet from the Varendra region
- Traillokyachandra - 10th century King of the Chandra dynasty who converted to Vajrayana Buddhism
- Vanaratna (1384–1468 CE) who is considered the last Indian Buddhist Pandit in Tibet.

Bhikkhus (monks)

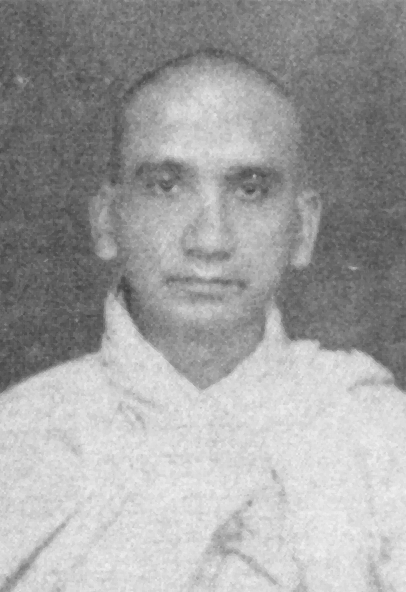
Dipankara Srijan, president of the Chittagong Buddhist Association, as leader of a delegation at the 6th Buddhist council in Rangoon.

- Gyanashree Mahathero
- Karmayogi Kripasaran Mahathero
- Jyotipal Mahathero
- Rajguru Aggavamsa Mahathera
- Rajguru Priyo Ratana Mahathera
- Ven. U Pannya Jota Mahathera
- Prajnananda Mahathera
- Suddhananda Mahathero
- Bishuddhananda Mahathera
- Satya Priya Mahathero

Administration

- Barrister Devasish Roy, Chakma Raja (Chakma Circle Chief)
- Bijoy Giri (15th Chakma Raja of Chakma Circle)
- Benita Roy (aristocrat, litterateur, diplomat, minister and Rani of Chakma Circle)
- Raja Nalinaksha Roy (49th Raja Of Chakma Circle)
- Mong Prue Sain (King of Mong Circle)

Freedom fighters

- UK Ching, Bir Bikram
- Braj Bihari Barua, freedom fighter

Politics

- Dilip Barua (Communist Party of Bangladesh (Marxist–Leninist) (Barua)). Former Minister of Industries.
- Supradip Chakma, advisor to the Interim government of Bangladesh. Chakma was born in 1961 in what is now Khagrachhari District (then in East Pakistan).
- Jyotirindra Bodhipriya Larma
- Manabendra Narayan Larma
- Charu Bikash Chakma
- Kalparanjan Chakma
- Ma Mya Ching
- Aung Shwe Prue Chowdhury
- Sacing Prue Jerry
- Maa Ma Ching Marma
- Dipankar Talukdar

Arts and literature

- Benimadhab Barua
- Kanak Chanpa Chakma, artist
- Bipradash Barua, author
- Partha Barua, singer, lead vocal and guitarist of Souls Band
- Subrata Barua
- Ratan Talukder, Actor and martial artist

Education

- Bikiran Prasad Barua
- Sukomal Barua
- Amit Chakma
- Aye Thein Rakhaine, Academic and Politician

Sports

- Debabrata Barua, cricket
- Sumon Barua, cricket
- Monika Chakma, football
- Rupna Chakma, football
- Anai Mogini, football
- Anuching Mogini, football
- Maria Manda, football
- Ritu Porna Chakma, football
- Suro Krishna Chakma, professional boxer
- Aungmraching Marma, football
- Champa Chakma, cricket
- Mitul Marma, football

== See also ==
- Islam in Bangladesh
- Hinduism in Bangladesh
- Christianity in Bangladesh
- Early Buddhist Texts
- Early Buddhist schools
- Pāli Canon
- Mangala Sutta
- Metta Sutta
- Ratana Sutta
- Madhu Purnima
- Bengali Buddhists
- Barua (Bangladesh)
- Chakma people
- Marma people
- Rakhine people
- Jumma people
- Buddha Dhatu Jadi
- Kamalapur Dharmarajika Bauddha Vihara
- Barua Buddhist Institutes in India and Bangladesh
- Bangladesh Bauddha Kristi Prachar Sangha
- Chittagong Pali College
- Bangladesh Sanskrit and Pali Education Board
