= Maung Shwe Prue Chowdhury =

Bangladeshi politician

- Raja

King of Bohmong Chiefdom
- Reign: 1959 – 1996
- Predecessor: Kya Jha Sain Prue Chowdhury
- Successor: Aung Shwe Prue Chowdhury

Member of the Bangladesh Parliament for Bandarban
- In office 10 July 1986 – 5 April 1991
- Leader: Kazi Zafar Ahmed; Moudud Ahmed; Mizanur Rahman Chowdhury
- Preceded by: constituency established
- Succeeded by: Bir Bahadur Ushwe Sing

Provincial Minister of East Pakistan
- In office 1966–1969
- Governor: Abdul Monem Khan
- Ministry: Forests, Public Works, Power and Irrigation
- Preceded by: Sultan Ahmed
- Succeeded by: Aung Shwe Prue Chowdhury; A. K. Mosharraf Hossain
- In office 1965–1966
- Governor: Abdul Monem Khan
- Ministry: Health, Labour and Social Welfare
- Preceded by: Sultan Ahmed
- Succeeded by: Fazlul Bari

Member of the East Pakistan Provincial Assembly for PE-150 (Chittagong Hill Tracts)
- In office 1965
- Preceded by: Tridev Roy
- Succeeded by: Tridev Roy

Personal details
- Born: 1917 Bandarban, British India
- Died: 16 June 1996 (aged 78–79) Bandarban, Bangladesh
- Party: JP
- Other political affiliations: BAKSAL (1975); AL (1972–1975); PMLC (1965–1969)
- Education: Chittagong College

Maung Shwe Prue Chowdhury (Bengali: মং শৈ প্রু চৌধুরী, 1917 – 16 June 1996) was a Bangladeshi politician and the 14th Chief of the Bohmong Circle. He served in various political roles during both the Pakistani period and after the independence of Bangladesh, including as a Member of Parliament and a government minister.

== Biography ==
Chowdhury was born in 1917 in Bandarban, Chittagong Hill Tracts District, Bengal Presidency, British India. During his education, he studied at St. Placid's School and College and Scottish Church College. He enrolled at Chittagong College to pursue a degree, but later left his studies unfinished and joined government service during World War II. He then served for about 15 years as a social welfare officer with the powers of a magistrate.

In 1959, he was appointed chief of the Bohmong Circle and titular king of the Marma people in the Chittagong Hill Tracts. During the presidency of Ayub Khan, Chowdhury also served as a member of the Provincial Advisory Council of East Pakistan. He was also a member of the Chittagong Hill Tracts Education Inquiry Committee, Development Committee, and Rehabilitation Committee. In 1965, he was elected as a member of the East Pakistan Provincial Assembly on the nomination of the Convention Muslim League (PMLC).

From 1965 to 1969, he served as a provincial minister in the then government of East Pakistan. In 1975, five years after independence of Bangladesh, during the rule of the Bangladesh Krishak Sramik Awami League (BAKSAL), he was declared governor of the newly proposed Bandarban District. In 1986, he was elected as a member of the Jatiya Sangsad from the Bandarban constituency.

Towards the end of his life, Chowdhury suffered from respiratory illness for a long time. He died on 16 June 1996 at the Bohmong palace in Bandarban, Bangladesh. At the time of his death, he was survived by his wife, three sons, and six daughters.
