= Sa Ching Prue Jerry =

Bangladeshi politician

Sa Ching Prue Jerry Prince
- সা চিং প্রু জেরি

Minister of Chittagong Hill Tracts Affairs
- Incumbent
- Assumed office 21 August 2026
- Prime Minister: Tarique Rahman
- Preceded by: Dipen Dewan

Member of Parliament
- Incumbent
- Assumed office 17 February 2026
- Preceded by: Ushwe Sing
- Constituency: Bandarban
- In office 19 March 1996 – 30 March 1996
- Preceded by: Ushwe Sing
- Succeeded by: Ushwe Sing
- Constituency: Bandarban

Personal details
- Born: 15 January 1953 (age 73) Bandarban, East Bengal
- Party: Bangladesh Nationalist Party
- Parent: Aung Shwe Prue Chowdhury (father)
- Relatives: Ma Mya Ching (aunt)

Sa Ching Prue Jerry (Bengali: সা চিং প্রু জেরি) is a Bangladeshi politician from Bandarban affiliated with the Bangladesh Nationalist Party. He is the incumbent Minister of Chittagong Hill Tracts Affairs since August 2026. He is a Member of Parliament and a member of the Bohmong Circle royal family. He is the son of Bohmong King Aung Shwe Prue Chowdhury.

== Biography ==
Jerry is a prince of Bohmong Circle. He is a Marma Buddhist. He is the son of Aung Shwe Prue Chowdhury. His aunt Ma Mya Ching was a member of the Jatiya Sangsad.

== Political career ==
He was elected as a member of the Jatiya Sangsad from Bandarban in the Sixth General Election of Bangladesh. He also served as the chairman of Bandarban Sadar Upazila and Bandarban Hill District Council.

During the 2026 Bangladeshi general election, he won the 13th National Parliament election by a huge margin in the parliamentary constituency number 300 in Bandarban District.
