= 1996 Bangladeshi general election =

1996 Bangladeshi general election may refer to:

- February 1996 Bangladeshi general election
- June 1996 Bangladeshi general election
