= Minyin Pru =

2nd Governor of the Bohmong Circle from 1631 to 1665

Bohmong Raja Minyin Pru
- မင်းရင်ဖြူ

2nd Governor of the Bohmong Circle
- In office 1631–1665
- Monarch: Thiri Thudhamma of Arakan
- Preceded by: Maung Saw Pru
- Succeeded by: Hari Pru

Personal details
- Children: Hari Pru
- Parent: Maung Saw Pru (father)
- Known for: great-grandson of Bayinnaung, second ruler of the Bohmong Circle

Raja Minyin Pru (Burmese: မင်းရင်ဖြူ, also spelt Men Rai Pru) was the grandson of King Nanda Bayin and great-grandson of Bayinnaung. He was the 2nd Governor of the Bohmong Circle (modern-day Bandarban District) from 1631 to 1665 succeeded from his father Maung Saw Pru, 1st Governor of the Bohmong Circle.

He married and had son, Hari Pru, 3rd Governor of the Bohmong Circle from 1665 to 1687.
