= Maung Saw Pru =

Bohmong Raja Maung Saw Pru
- မောင်စောဖြူ

1st Governor of the Bohmong Circle
- In office 1599–1631
- Monarchs: Nanda Bayin; Min Razagyi of Arakan
- Preceded by: Position established
- Succeeded by: Minyin Pru

Governor of the Chittagong
- In office 1614–?
- Monarch: Khamaung of Mrauk U

Personal details
- Children: Minyin Pru
- Parents: Nanda Bayin (father); Dagon Minthami, Dawadon (Dao-wa-dueng), the daughter of Pe-Ha-Aung (Petch-hueng) Binnya Jakka (Phraya Chakri) Gov.of Dagon (Yangon) (mother)
- Known for: grandson of Bayinnaung, first ruler of the Bohmong Htaung

Raja Maung Saw Pru (Burmese: မောင်စောဖြူ, also spelt Mong Saw Pru) was a son of King Nanda Bayin and grandson of Bayinnaung. He was the 1st Governor of the Bohmong Circle (modern-day Bandarban District) from 1599 to 1631 appointed by Arakan king Min Razagyi during the Toungoo dynasty.

== Biography ==
=== Role ===
In 1599, Min Razagyi, the King of Arakan led to the capitulation of Hanthawaddy kingdom. Nanda Bayin, the King of Pegu was defeated and perished in the war. Daughter of Nanda Bayin, Princess Thien Daw Hnaung and minor Prince Maung Saw Prue were taken into Mrauk U Kingdom, the capital of Arakan, as captive along with other booties. Some 3000 families from Pegu followed the scion of their ruler and settled in Arakan.

The Arakanese King Min Razagyi appointed a Prince of Pegu Maung Saw Pru as the governor of newly established Bohmong Htaung (Circle) by giving the title of "Bohmong" Raja in 1599. Min Razagyi married the Princess Khin Ma Hnaung and his son Khamaung appointed his uncle-in law Prince Maung Saw Pru as Governor of Chittagong in 1614.

In 1620, who repulsed the Portuguese invasion with extreme courage and valor, King Khamaung conferred the title "Bohmong" (means the Great General) to Maung Saw Pru. Ancestors of the present Bohmong dynasty were the successor of the Pegu King of Burma under the Arakan's rule in Chittagong.
