= Marma people =

Ethnic group of Bangladesh, Myanmar and India

Marma
မာရမာ
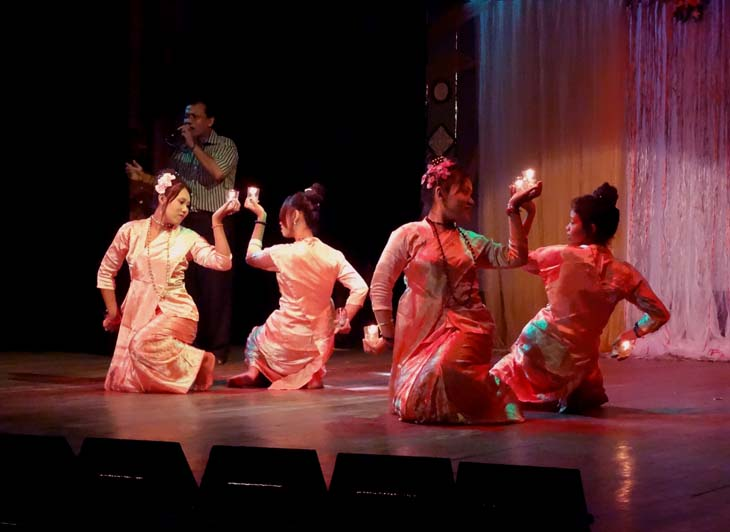
- Marma dancers

Total population
- 300,000+

Regions with significant populations
- Bangladesh, India, Myanmar
- Bangladesh (Bandarban, Khagrachari, Rangamati, Patuakhali and Barguna Districts): 224,261
- India (Tripura): 37,893
- Myanmar (Rakhine State): 20,000

Languages
- Marma

Religion
- Theravada Buddhism

Related ethnic groups
- Rakhine people, Bamar people, Chakma people, Barua people and Other Tibeto-Burman people

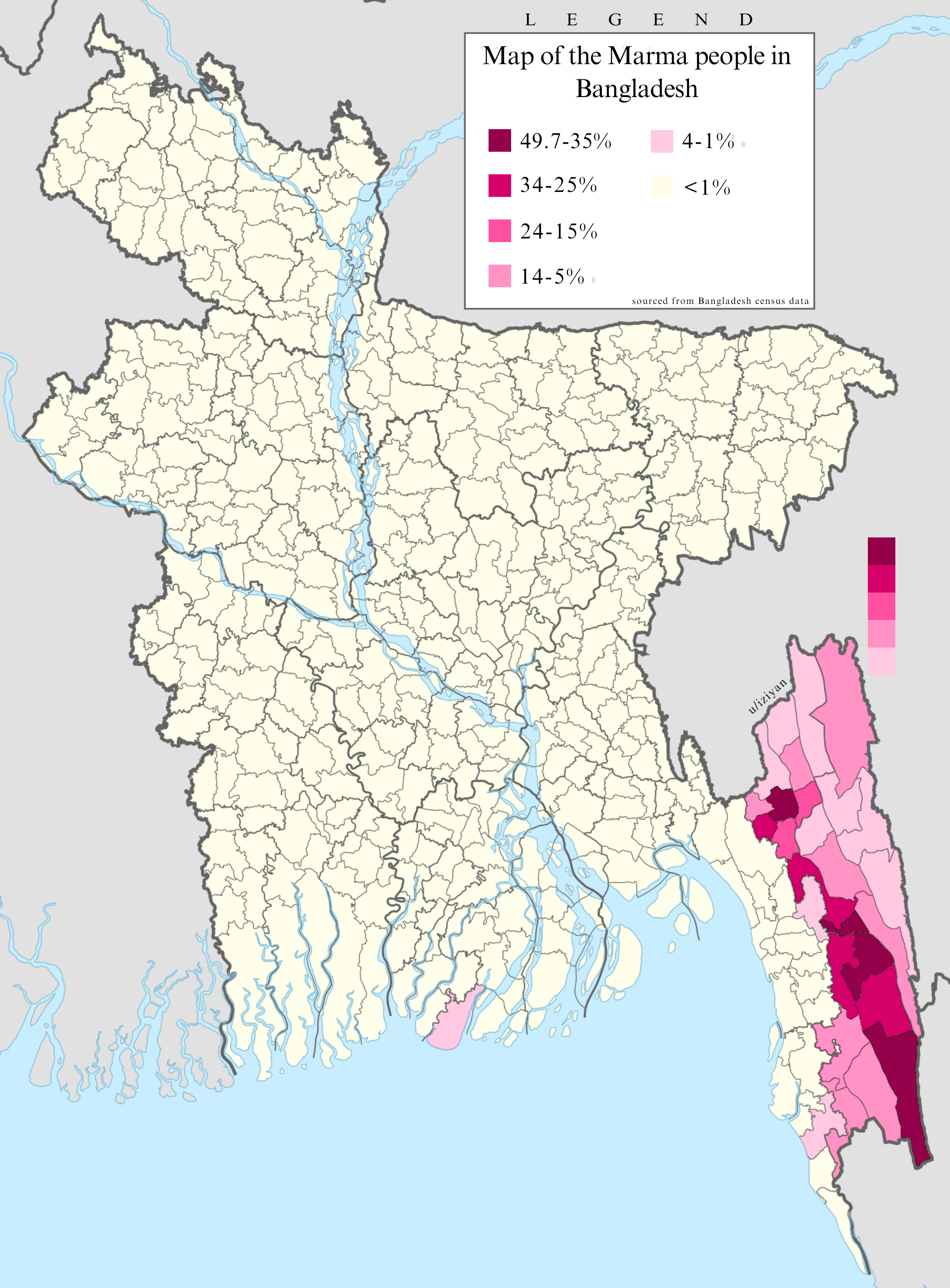
Map of Marma people in Bangladesh by upazila

The Marma (Rakhine: မရမာ) are an ethnic group native to parts of south-eastern Bangladesh and southern Tripura in India. They are the second-largest ethnic community in Bangladesh's Chittagong Hill Tracts, primarily residing in the Bandarban, Khagrachari and Rangamati Hill Districts. They belong to the same community as the Rakhine people. There are three endogamous groups within the Magh Community, known as (i) the Thongtha, Khyongtha, or Mrokpatha, (ii) the Marma, Mayamma, or Rakhaing Magh, (iii) the Maramagri, otherwise called the Barua Maghs.

== Ethnonyms ==
In the 17th and 18th centuries, the Rakhine began calling themselves Mranma (မြန်မာ) and its derivatives like Marama (မရမာ), as attested by texts like the Rakhine Minrazagri Ayedaw Sadan and the Dhanyawaddy Ayedawbon. This endonym continues to be used by the Marma. The term "Marma" is derived from "Myanmar," which was first used in the early 1100s. In the Marma and Arakanese, Myanmar is pronounced Mranma ([mɹəmà]), not Myanma ([mjəmà]). In the Burmese language, the Marma are known as the Marama (မရမာ).

By 1585, European, Persian, and Bengali sources began referring to the Marma and other regional Buddhist communities, such as the Barua people, as Mugh or Magh—terms not used by the groups themselves. The word's etymology likely derives from Magadha, the name of an ancient Buddhist kingdom. The Marmas considered these names to be pejorative because of the word's association with piracy, and thus assumed the name Marma in the 1940s. Some Marmas in the Indian state of Tripura continue to self-identify as Marima, or as Mogs.

== History ==
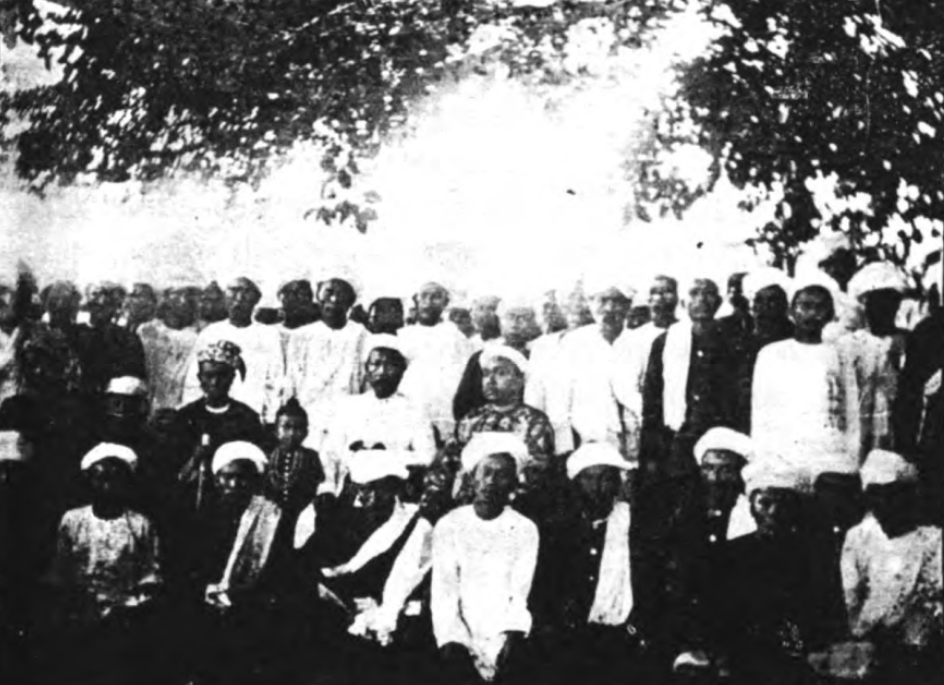
Group of Bandarban Marmas with Bohmong in centre, c. 1906

The ancestors of the Marma, the Rakhine, lived in a coastal region between Chittagong and the Arakan Mountains, in what is now Rakhine State of Myanmar. Between the 15th and 16th centuries, the Rakhine and all the Buddhist groups in the region received a reputation for piracy in association with the Portuguese, due to endemic piracy in the Bay of Bengal. According to Lucien Bernot (1967), many Marma clan names indicate connections with the royal court of Arakan. He also noted that the Marma themselves firmly believe that their ancestors originated from Arakan. In addition, Marma oral tradition maintains that, before settling in Arakan, their forebears lived in the region of Pegu and were therefore of Mon origin, although this claim remains largely unverified.

Between the 16th and 18th centuries, the Marmas migrated from their homeland to the Chittagong Hill Tracts, coinciding with the Kingdom of Mrauk U's conquest of Chittagong. According to David Bradley, the Marma people first migrated from Arakan to the Chittagong Hill Tracts in the early sixteenth century, with another wave of migration occurring after the Burmese conquest of Arakan in 1785. Generally, the Rakhine people settled in the hill tracts during the Mrauk U invasion of Chittagong, gradually formed the Marma identity. The Rakhines who migrated later to the coastal plains of Chittagong during the Burmese invasion of Arakan continued using the term "Rakhine."

Records of the East India Company and others indicate that the Marmas migrated from the Kingdom of Mrauk U to Chittagong of Bangladesh in two phases of migrations during 14th to 17th centuries in the golden period of Mrauk U. In the first phase, during the Mrauk U Kingdom expanded to some parts of Chittagong Division. Secondly, Marma ancestors fled to Chittagong and settled down as the Arakanese kingdom was conquered and annexed by Burmese king Bodawpaya in 1785.

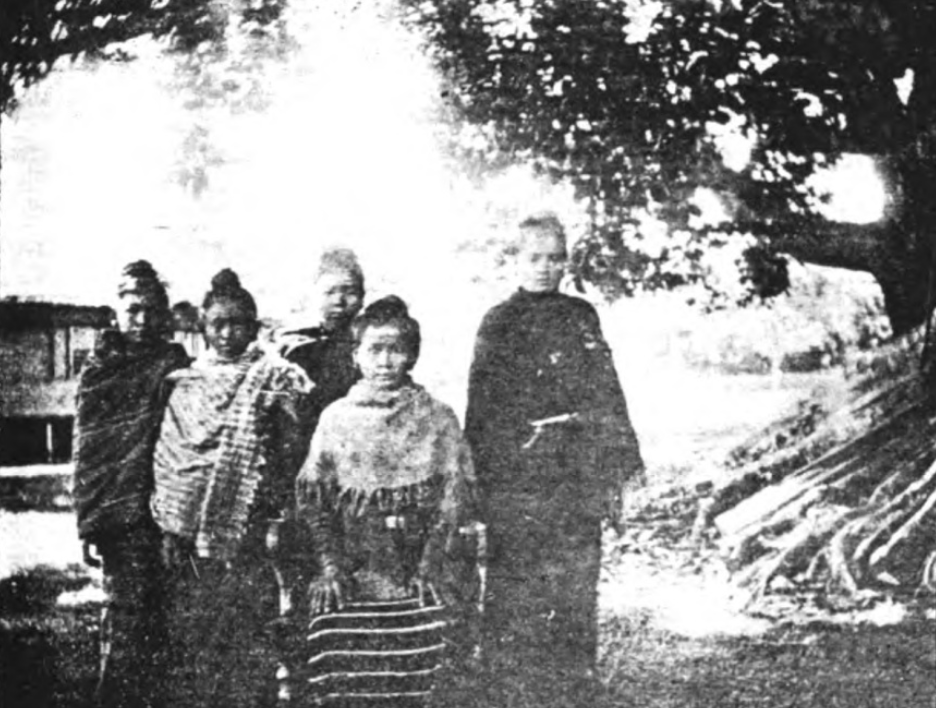
Marma girls, c. 1906.

In 1971, following the Bangladesh Liberation War in which Bangladesh achieved independence, the country's majority Bengali Muslims began settling in the Chittagong Hill Tracts, which has displaced native inhabitants.

=== Genetic studies ===
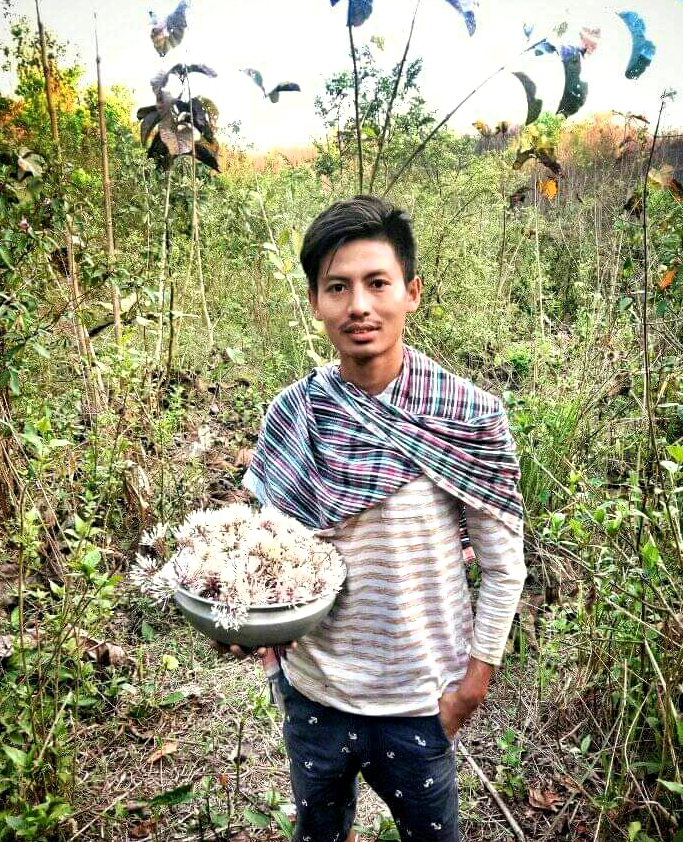
A marma youth with Sangrai pang flowers

Genetic studies have indicated that the Marma populations share a high frequency of Indian and low frequency of East Asian specific maternal haplogroups, and have the highest haplotype diversity when compared with Tripura and Chakma populations, suggesting deep colonization of the region by Marmas.

== Marma in Bangladesh ==
According to 2022 census, Marmas are the second largest ethnic group in Bandarban District (17.49%), third largest in Rangamati Hill District (7.93%) and fourth largest in Khagrachhari District (10.39%).

Folk song by an elderly Marma person

They are the largest ethnic group in Rowangchhari Upazila (49.48%), Guimara Upazila (38.10%), Rajasthali Upazila (36.65%), Thanchi Upazila (31.37%) and Ruma Upazila (31.04%).

Upazila	District	Percentage of Marma
Rowangchhari	Bandarban	49.48%
Guimara	Khagrachhari	38.10%
Rajasthali	Rangamati	36.65%
Thanchi	Bandarban	31.37%
Ruma	Bandarban	31.04%
Kaptai	Rangamati	28.59%
Kaukhali	Rangamati	27.86%
Bandarban Sadar	Bandarban	23.97%
Lakshmichhari	Khagrachhari	21.82%
Manikchhari	Khagrachhari	18.73%
Mahalchhari	Khagrachhari	15.25%
Lama	Bandarban	11.32%
Khagrachhari Sadar	Khagrachhari	10.86%
Ramgarh	Khagrachhari	10.61%
Belaichhari	Rangamati	8.97%
Naikhongchhari	Bandarban	6.15%
Alikadam	Bandarban	6.04%
Panchhari	Khagrachhari	3.12%
Matiranga	Khagrachhari	2.07%
Rangamati Sadar	Rangamati	1.88%
Naniarchar	Rangamati	1.73%
Others	_	<1%%

=== Exodus ===
Due to persections in the Chittagong Hill Tracts, many Marma families began fleeing from Bandarban and Rangamati districts to Rakhine State, Myanmar, as early as 2012–2014. According to the Diplomat, the families alleged that Muslim settlers from the plains, supported by local Bangladeshi people, moved into their ancestral lands, burned paddy fields, and restricted their movements. Around 20,000 Marmas have settled in Myanmar.

== Mog in India ==
According to 2011 census, Mogs are largely concentrated in South Tripura and Gomati districts of Tripura.

Block	District	Percentage of Mog
Rupaichari	South Tripura	23.92%
Bokafa	South Tripura	9.26%
Karbook	Gomati	5.52%
Satchand	South Tripura	2.98%

== Culture ==
The culture of the Marmas is similar to that of the Rakhine people, including their language, food, clothes, religion, dance, and funeral rites. Marma men wear a sarong called lungyi, while Marma women wear a sarong called thabein.

Marmas mostly depend on agriculture, traditionally practicing slash-and-burn cultivation on the hills. Their belief in Theravada Buddhism is as deep as the Rakhine society's, with an emphasis on ritual practices in deities. Some Marmas also practice Animism, Christianity.

Marmas follow the Burmese calendar. They celebrate the New Year, called Sangrai (သင်္ကြန်), which begins on the first day of Bohag. They make sangraimu, which is a form of traditional cakes. They take part in Sangrain Relong Pwe (သင်္ကြန်ရေလောင်းပွဲ; water pouring), where young Marma men and women spray each other with water. Sangrai is celebrated over three days. On the 1st day, called Painchwai or Akro, homes are decorated with flowers. On the 2nd day, Sangrai Akya, Marmas participate in traditional sports, dances, cultural activities and hold meetings regarding community issues. They also go to monasteries to participate in the Buddha statue's bathing (cleansing) ritual on this day. On the 3rd day, called Sangrai Atada, they cook a vegetable dish made out of more than 100 ingredients, called hangbong (ဟင်းပေါင်း; pachan in Bangla).

After death, Marma elders are cremated, while younger deceased Marmas are buried.

== Festival ==
Like other ethnic peoples, the Marma's celebrate a variety of traditional festivals such as birth, death, marriage and New Year. The main festivals of Marma's are: - Buddha Purnima, Kathina, Oyahgyai or Prabarana Purnima, Sangrai etc. The Marma New Year festival is called Sangrai. In addition to these festivals, other natural festivals are also celebrated, which are often similar to other indigenous ethnic groups in Bangladesh.

=== Buddha Punirma ===
On this full moon day, Mahamati Gautam Buddha was born, attained enlightenment and attained Mahaparinirvana . It is a religious festival. Every year, the festival is celebrated with great enthusiasm and fervor.

=== Kathina ===
One night, it's the color of cotton yarn from the Buddhist monks wear in their chibara.

=== Wagyoi or Prabarona ===
Wagyai or Prabarona Purnima is a major religious festival of the Marmas. On this day, this festival is celebrated with great joy and happiness in every society of Marmas and Bihar. These days, delicious cakes are made at home. On this day at night, lanterns are blown to worship and dedicate the great hair of Gautam Buddha.

=== Sangrai ===
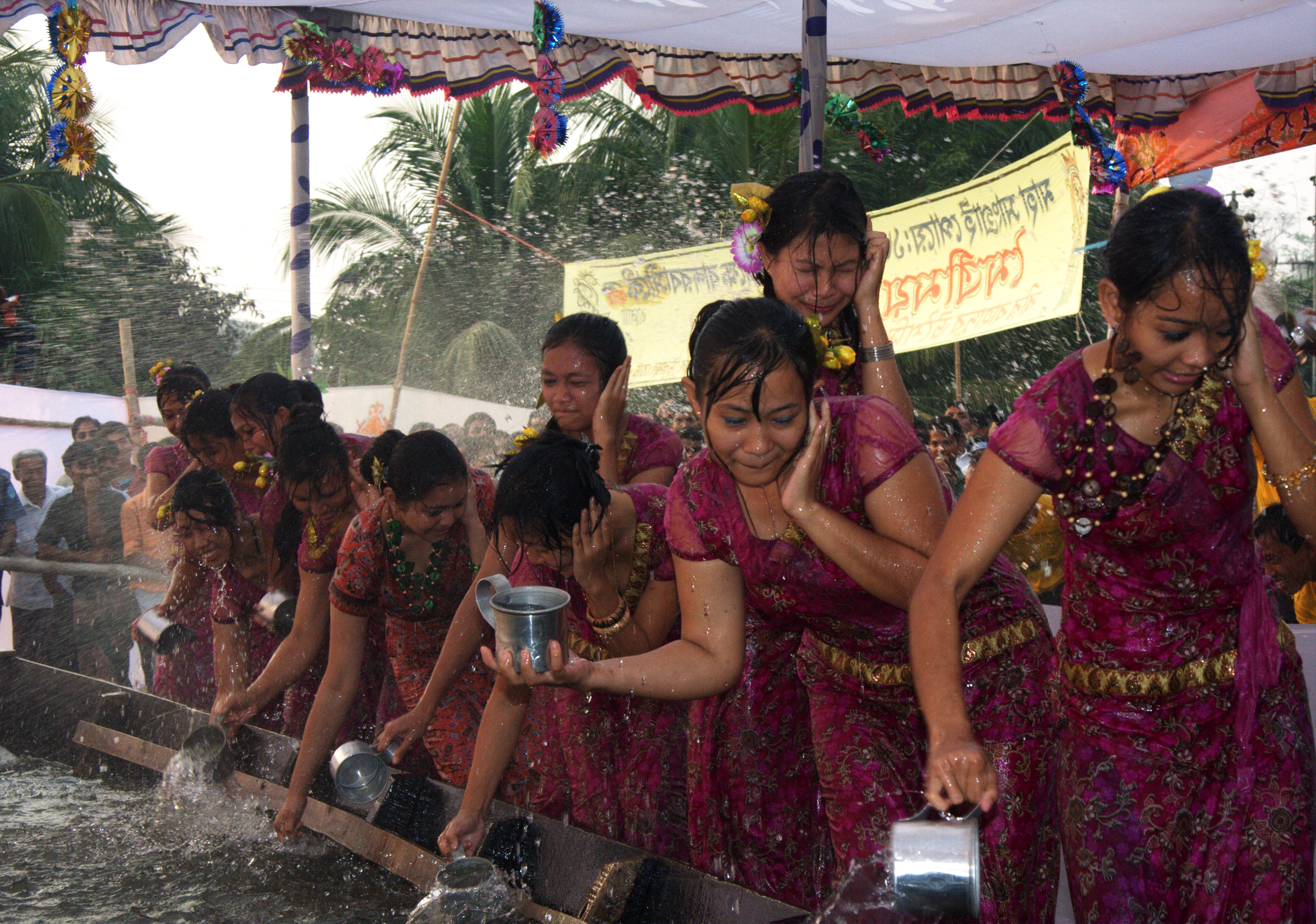
Marma girls at the Water Festival during Sangrai (New year celebration.)

The name of the Marma New Year festival is 'Sangrai'. This is one of their main traditional ceremonies. They organize this festival on the Bengali new year occasion of month Boishakh. On the occasion of the New Year, they organize various interesting events in Sangrai. Water festival is one of these events. On that day, the Marma youths rejoiced by sprinkling water on each other. By sprinkling water, they wash away the dirt and ink of the past year. Apart from that, they also find the person of their choice through water sports. In addition to water sports, they celebrate the Sangrai festival by performing other rituals such as pangchowai (flower sangrai), sangrai ji, candle lighting and buddhasnan. They enjoy their festivals by speaking on their mother tongue.

== Notable people ==
=== Bangladeshi ===
- Uk Ching Marma, Bangladeshi freedom fighter
- Ushwe Sing, Bangladeshi politician
- Saching Prue Jerry, Bangladeshi politician
- Aung Shwe Prue Chowdhury, Bangladeshi politician
- Ma Mya Ching, Bangladeshi politician
- Anai Mogini, Bangladeshi footballer
- Mitul Marma, Bangladeshi footballer
- Aungmraching Marma, Bangladesh national team footballer and former captain
- Pannya Jota Mahathera, Bangladeshi Theravada monk

=== Indian ===
- Mailafru Mog, Indian politician and member of Tripura Legislative Assembly

== See also ==
- Barua (Bangladesh)
- Bengali Buddhists
- Bohmong Circle
- Buddhism in Bangladesh
- Mong Circle
