= Ma Mya Ching =

Bangladeshi politician

Member of Parliament for Reserved Women's Seat-30
- In office 5 March 1991 – 24 November 1995
- Succeeded by: Aye Thein Rakhaine
- In office 19 March 1996 – 30 March 1996

Personal details
- Party: Bangladesh Nationalist Party
- Relatives: Aung Shwe Prue Chowdhury (co-brother-in-law); Sa Ching Prue Jerry (nephew)

Ma Mya Ching is a Bangladeshi politician from Bandarban belonging to Bangladesh Nationalist Party. She is a former member of the Jatiya Sangsad.

== Biography ==
Ching is Aung Shwe Prue Chowdhury's co-sister-in-law and she is Saching Prue Jerry's aunt. She was elected as a member of the Jatiya Sangsad from Reserved Women's Seat-30 in the Fifth Jatiya Sangsad Election. She was also elected as a member of the Jatiya Sangsad from Reserved Women's Seat-30 in the Sixth General Election of Bangladesh.

Marma is the district BNP president in Bandarban. She was a member of parliament nominated by the Bangladesh Nationalist Party from 30 women's seats in the Fifth and Sixth National Assemblies.

Marma was defeated by Bir Bahadur Ushai Singh in the 8th National Assembly elections of 2001 and the 9th National Assembly elections of 2008.
