= Pannya Jota Mahathera =

Bangladeshi Theravada Buddhist monk

- ဦးပညာဇောတမဟာထေရ် উ পঞ্ঞা জোত মহাথের
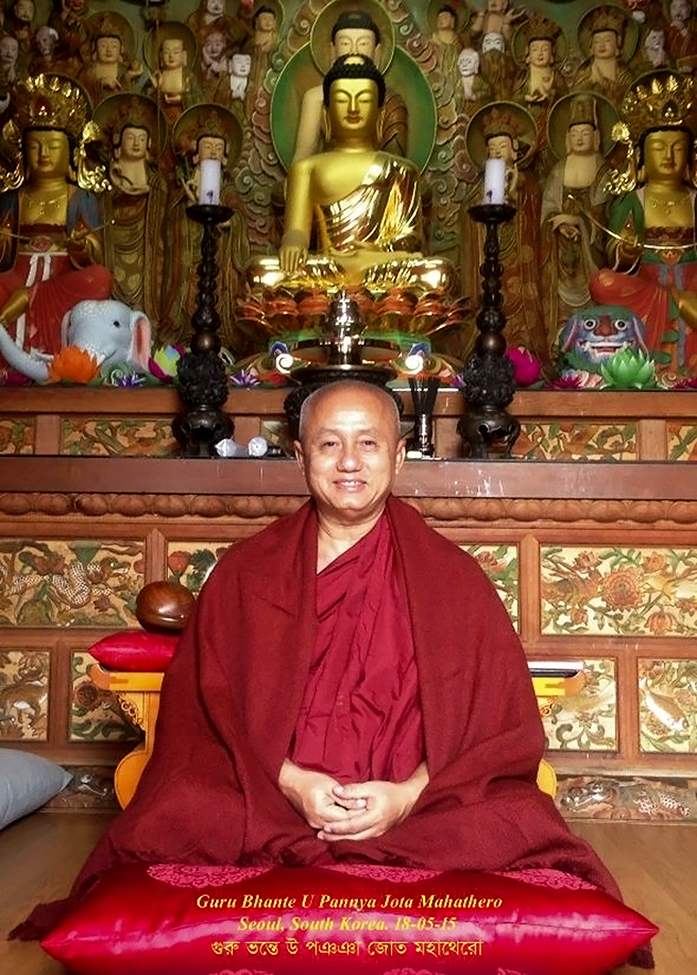
- Ven. U Pannya Jota Mahathera in 2015

Personal life
- Born: U Saw Hla; 22 December 1955 Bandarban District, East Pakistan
- Died: 13 April 2020 (aged 64)
- Education: L.L.B, L.L.M, B.C.S
- Known for: Founder of Buddha Dhatu Jadi, Rama Zadi, The World Buddha Sasana Sevaka Sangha, etc.
- Other name: Guru Bhante
- Occupation: Ex. Sr. Asstt. Judge

Religious life
- Religion: Buddhism
- Sect: Theravada Buddhism

Senior posting
- Based in: Pannya Passanara Buddhist Monaster, Ujani Para, Bandarban, Bangladesh

Ven. U Pannya Jota Mahathera (Burmese: ဦးပညာဇောတမဟာထေရ်, Bengali: উ পঞ্ঞা জোত মহাথের; 22 December 1955 – 13 April 2020), locally known as Guru Bhante, was a Bangladeshi Theravada monk. He was born in a Royal Bohmong family in Bandarban, East Pakistan. He served the government of Bangladesh as a judge and magistrate for about eight years prior to becoming a Buddhist monk.

== Biography ==
=== Early life ===
U Pannya Jota (Birth name: U Saw Hla, Bengali: উচহ্লা) was born in Bandarban, East Pakistan, on 22 December 1955, to father Hla Thowai Prue and mother Aung Mra Ching. His grandfather, Kyaw Zaw Than, was King of the Royal Bohmong family.

At the age of six or seven, he began to attend school in Bandarban. After high school and college, he was admitted to Dhaka University in the Law department.

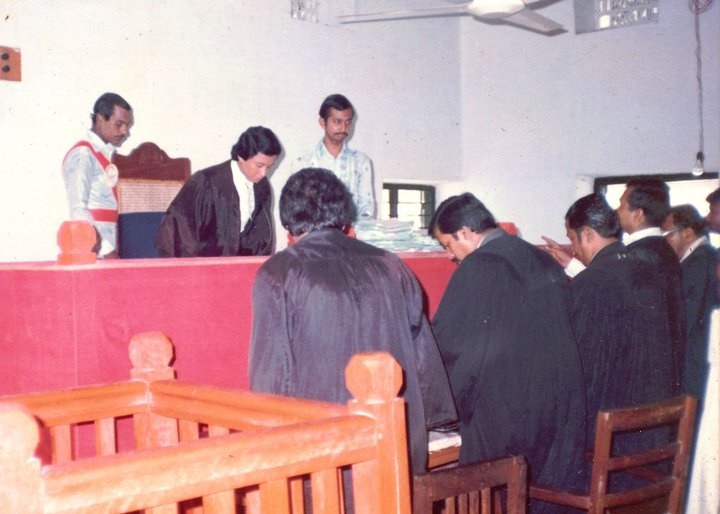
Mr. U Saw Hla (Ven. U Pannya Jota Thera) as an Assistant Judge and Magistrate of Government of the People's Republic of Bangladesh was taking his seat at Hathazari Court, Chittagong, Bangladesh, in 1985

.

=== University ===
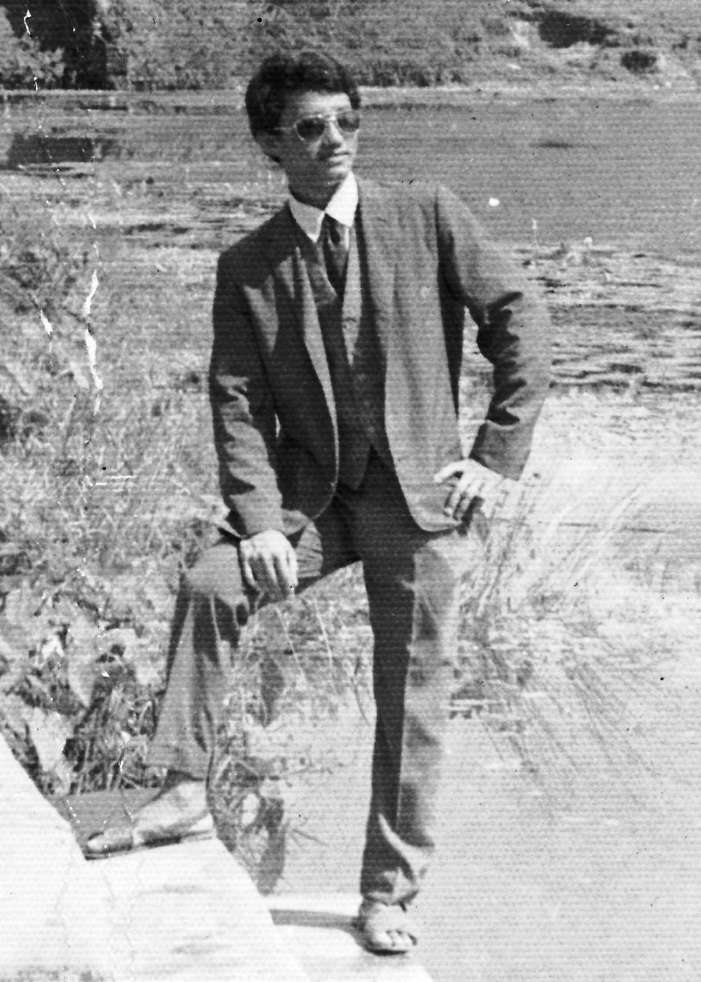
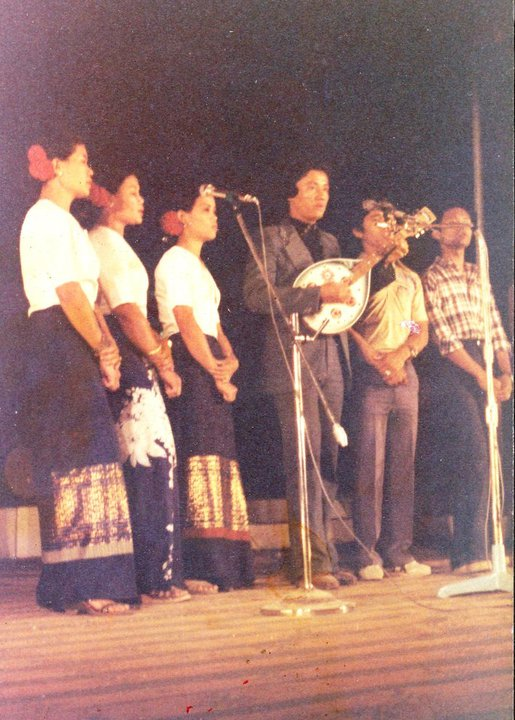
Left: U Saw Hla (Ven. U Pannya Jota Thera) in near Raj Pukur at Bandarban in 1975. Right: Mr. U Saw Hla (Ven. U Pannya Jota Thera) was performing as a singer (third from right) during a cultural show at Dhaka, on 16 December 1980

During university, Jota led several organizations in promoting education among the students. He also joined many organizations that worked for the promotion of indigenous cultural heritage. He performed traditional songs at functions and composed many popular Marma songs like "Sangrai ma." He also formed a band named The Royal Artists Group (Bengali: দি রয়েল শিল্পীগোষ্ঠী). After his graduation, he served the Bangladesh Government as a judge and magistrate for about 8 years. He resigned from his job as a judge and became a Buddhist monk in 1990 at Ching Mrong Bihara. At that time, he changed his name to U Pannya Jota Mahathera.

=== Life as U Pannya Jota ===
U Pannya Jota learnt and practiced Buddhism in depth, he believed Buddhism had the potential to bring peace to the minds of all people. He visited various places and taught Dhamma to the laypeople. He was one of the social reformers who worked on the scientific understanding of Buddhism and denied the non-scientific ideas that many in Bangladesh believed. Outside of preaching, he spent most of his free time practicing meditation. He visited various countries and met many meditation teachers, such as S.N. Goenka. He learned meditation from meditation masters in India and Burma.

== Publications ==
U Pannya Jota was not only a practitioner, but a Buddhist scholar as well, publishing many books on Buddhist topics. His books were highly successful among Bangladeshi Buddhist readers.

Name of Books	Series	Years	Version
Sadhana Paddhati O Dikkha		1990	Bangla
Bidorshon Darpon	Vipassana Mirror		Bangla
Poncha Guno Ananta Bandana		2003	Bangla, Marma
Deshona Kolpotoru	Part-1 (Nirvana for Them)	2005	Bangla
Deshona Kolpotoru	Part-2 (Is Buddhism a religion?)	2005	Bangla
Deshona Kolpotoru	Part-3 (Reincarnation and Science)	2005	Bangla
Deshona Kolpotoru	Part-4 (Nation, Dhamma, Buddha Sasana)	2015	Bangla
Deshona Kolpotoru	Part-5 (Four Saint Dhamma)	2018	Bangla

== Establishment ==
U Pannya Jota built several temples inside and outside of Bangladesh. These are some of his temples built by him. Some are under construction.

- Zin Mara Jayi Dhatu Zadi | Bandarban, Bangladesh. (Reconstruction, more than 250 years old)
- Khyaungwa Kyaung Raja Vihara (Chief priest) | Bandarban, Bangladesh.
- Pannya Passanara Buddhist Monastery | Bandarban, Bangladesh.
- Buddha Dhatu Naundawgree Zadi | Bandarban, Bangladesh.
- Maha Shuka Chutongbrae Buddha Dhatu Jadi | Bandarban, Bangladesh.
- Rama Naundawgree Pagoda | Bandarban, Bangladesh.
- Rama Zadi | Bandarban, Bangladesh.
- Bangladesh Buddhist Monastery | Yangoon, Myanmar.
- Bangladesh Buddhist Monastery | Maung Daw, Arakan State, Myanmar.
- Kyaukmalaung Zadi | Bandarban, Bangladesh. (under construction)
- The Holy Jaghat Santi Sukha Zadi | Chimbuk, Bandarban, Bangladesh. (under construction)
- Buddha Gaya Temple | Buddha Gaya, India. (under construction)

=== Buddha Dhatu Jadi ===
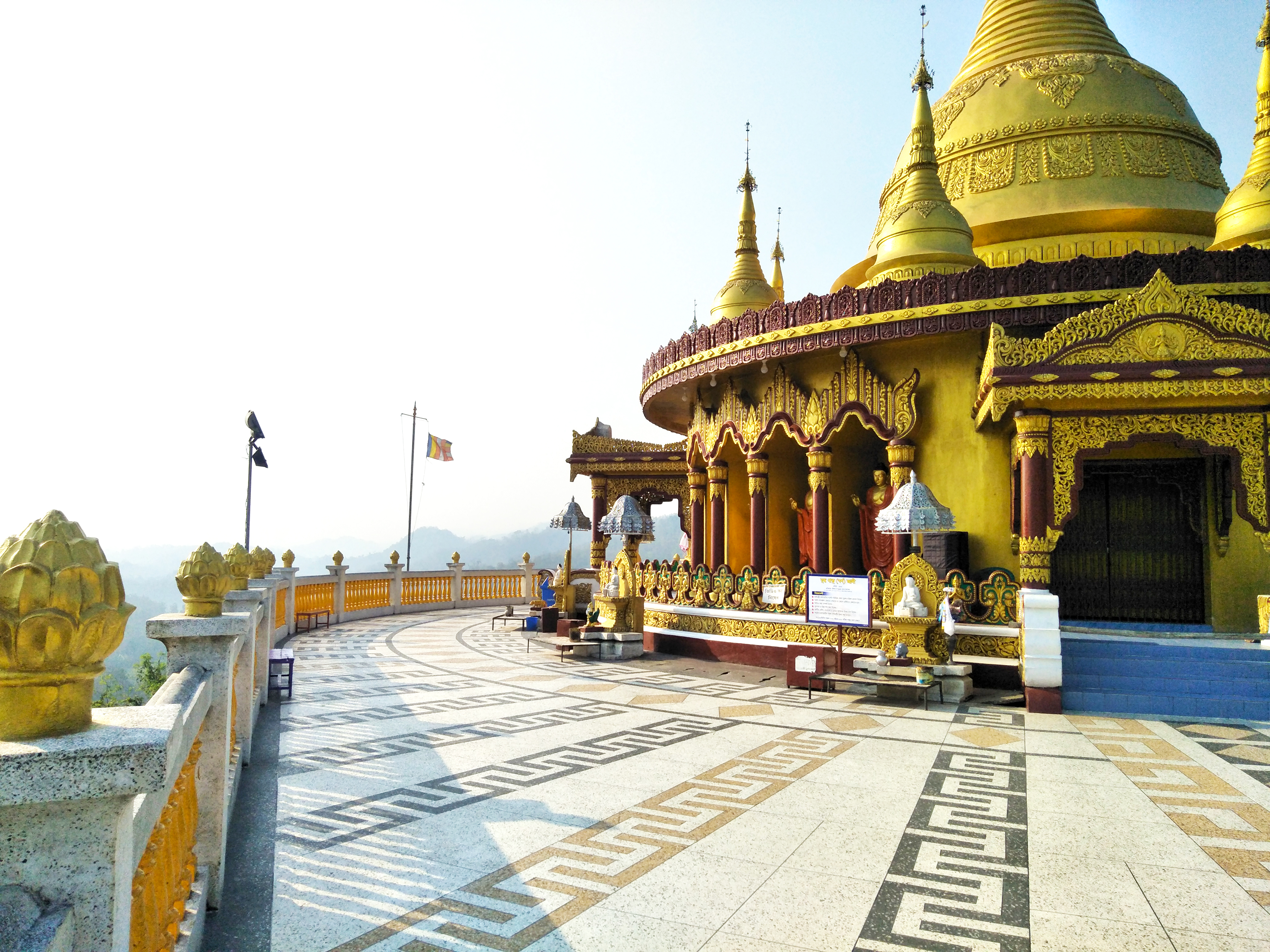
Close View of Buddha Dhatu Jadi

One of the most famous temples founded by U Pannya Jota is the Buddha Dhatu Jadi. Also known as the Bandarban Golden Temple, the temple features a golden bell set on a dragon statue along with the second-biggest Buddhist statue in Bangladesh. The Buddha's dhatu (relic), which is enshrined in the temple, was a gift given to Ven. U Pannya Jota Mahathera in 1994 by the State Sangha Maha Nayaka Committee of Myanmar.

=== Rama Zadi ===
Rama Zadi is one of the largest Buddhist temple of Bangladesh, which is located in Hoda Babur Ghona area of Rohangchhari Upazila Road, 3 km away from the Bandarban District town. Its height is almost 175 ft.

== Participation ==
U Pannya Jota attended the following conferences in order to promote the exchange of ideas and maintain international connections with Buddhist countries.

- The World Buddhist Summit, Yangon, Myanmar, 2004.
- UN Day of Vesak, Bangkok, Thailand, 2007.
- UN Day of Vesak, Hanoi, Vietnam, 2008.
- World Religions Conference, Seoul, 2015.
