= Mong Prue Sain =

King of the Mong Circle

Mong Prue Sain was the king of the Mong Circle, one of three circles; the others being the Chakma Circle and the Bohmong Circle. He was a member of the Central Committee of Bangladesh Krishak Sramik Awami League, the one-party government of Bangladesh created by the Awami League, and governor of Khagrachari District.

== Career ==
Sain had fought in the Bangladesh Liberation war and helped settled refugees displaced by the war. After the end of Bangladesh Liberation war, he served as the Tribal Affairs advisor to the new government. He protested the detention of tribals for allegedly collaborating with the Pakistan Army. He and Manabendra Narayan Larma handed over a memorandum to President Sheikh Mujibur Rahman demanding autonomy for indigenous tribes in the Chittagong Hill Tracks in 1972.

After President Sheikh Mujibur Rahman created the one party BAKSAL state, he appointed Sain as a member of the Central Committee in 1975. The government appointed him Governor of Khagrachari District.

== Death and legacy ==
Sain reigned till his death in 1984 and was succeeded by his wife, Rani Nihar Devi. Their foster daughter, Princes Unika Devi, succeeded her and ruled for two year until the government removed her due her being a foster child. She was replaced by Paihala Prue Chowdhury, then a district information officer, in 1996. His daughter challenged the decision in court and lost.

An annual scholarship, Freedom Fighter Mong Circle Chief Mong Prue Sain Stipend, named after him is awarded to students from Khagrachari District. Mong Circle Chief Mong Prue Sain Award is also named after him.
