= Bandarban (Jatiya Sangsad constituency) =

Constituency of Bangladesh's Jatiya Sangsad

Coordinates: 22.1952°N 92.2192°E

- Constituency for the Jatiya Sangsad
- District: Bandarban Hill District
- Division: Chittagong Division
- Electorate: 310,781 (2026)

Current constituency
- Created: 1984
- Party: Bangladesh Nationalist Party
- Member: Sa Ching Prue Jerry
- ← 299 Rangamati

Bandarban is a constituency represented in the Jatiya Sangsad (National Parliament) of Bangladesh since 2026 by Sa Ching Prue Jerry of the Bangladesh Nationalist Party.

== Boundaries ==
The constituency encompasses Bandarban Hill District.

== Members of Parliament ==
Election	Member	Party
1986	Maung Shwe Prue Chowdhury	Jatiya Party (Ershad)
1991	Bir Bahadur Ushwe Sing	Awami League
Feb 1996	Sa Ching Prue Jerry	Bangladesh Nationalist Party
Jun 1996	Bir Bahadur Ushwe Sing	Awami League
2001	Bir Bahadur Ushwe Sing	Awami League
2008	Bir Bahadur Ushwe Sing	Awami League
2014	Bir Bahadur Ushwe Sing	Awami League
2018	Bir Bahadur Ushwe Sing	Awami League
2024	Bir Bahadur Ushwe Sing	Awami League
2026	Sa Ching Prue Jerry	Bangladesh Nationalist Party

== Elections ==
=== Elections in the 2020s ===
General Election 2026: Bandarban
Party	Candidate	Votes	%	±%
BNP	Sa Ching Prue Jerry	141,455		
NCP	Abu Sayeed Md. Shuja Uddin	26,162		
IAB	Md Abul Kalam Azad	4,718		
JP(E)	Abu Jafar Mohammad Wali Ullah	2,435		
Majority				
Turnout				
Registered electors		315,422		
BNP gain from AL				

=== Elections in the 2010s ===
General Election 2018: Bandarban
Party	Candidate	Votes	%	±%
AL	Bir Bahadur Ushwe Sing	143,966	70.66	N/A
BNP	Sa Ching Prue Jerry	58,719	28.83	N/A
IAB	Shawkatul Islam	1,003	0.49	N/A
Majority		85,247	41.83	
Turnout		203,688	82.53	
Registered electors		246,873		
AL hold				
