= UK Ching =

UK Ching Marma
- ইউ. কে. চিং মারমা
- Died: 25 July 2014 (aged 86); Chittagong Medical College Hospital
- Cause of death: Stroke
- Military career
- Allegiance: Pakistan (Before 1971); Bangladesh
- Branch: East Pakistan Rifles
- Service years: 1952 - 1982
- Conflicts: Bangladesh Liberation War
- Awards: Bir Bikrom

UK Ching (1937 - 25 July 2014) was a Bangladeshi freedom fighter, who was awarded the Bir Bikrom in 1971 for his military services in the Bangladesh Liberation War. Ching was born in 1937 in a Marma family of Chittagong Hill Tracts (now in Bangladesh) of British India. At the age of 15, Ching joined the East Pakistan Rifles (later known as the Bangladesh Rifles and now the Border Guard Bangladesh). He served Mukti Bahini in the Bangladesh liberation war and remained an active member of the Bangladesh Rifles until 1982.

== Role in Liberation war ==
As a member of the East Pakistan Rifles, he fought in Sector 6 during Bangladesh's Liberation War. UK Ching joined the East Pakistan Rifles in 1952 at the age of 19. On 25 March 1971, he was serving as a nayek (corporal) at the Hatibandha Border Outpost (BOP) in Rangpur district. At that post, he killed one Bihari officer and two Punjabi soldiers, then joined the war effort with the remaining nine Bengali EPR soldiers stationed there.

UK Ching Marma participated in several successful operations against the Pakistani forces. One of them was the Kauwahaga Hat Operation. The operation was conducted under the single leadership of UK Ching.

== Awards and recognition ==
For his courage and bravery in the Liberation War, UK Ching was awarded the title of Bir Bikrom. He is the only freedom fighter from an indigenous ethnic minority group in the country to receive this honor.

On 8 December 2017, the state minister for the Ministry of Chittagong Hill Tracts Affairs, Bir Bahadur Ushwe Sing, proposed naming the stadium in Bandarban after him as Bir Muktijoddha Late U.K. Ching Bir Bikrom.

== Personal life ==
Ching is survived by his wife, two sons and two daughters. He died on 25 July 2014, of a stroke.
