= Ethinab Rakhain =

Bangladeshi politician

Member of Bangladesh Parliament
- In office 2008–2014

Personal details
- Party: Bangladesh Awami League

Ethinab Rakhain (Bengali: এ থিনাব রাখাইন) is a Bangladesh Awami League politician and a former member of the Bangladesh Parliament from a reserved seat.

== Career ==
Rakhain was elected to parliament from a reserved seat in Cox's Bazar as a Bangladesh Awami League candidate in 2008.
