= Supradip Chakma =

Bangladeshi political adviser

- 𑄥𑄪𑄛𑄴𑄘𑄨𑄛𑄴 𑄌𑄋𑄴𑄟
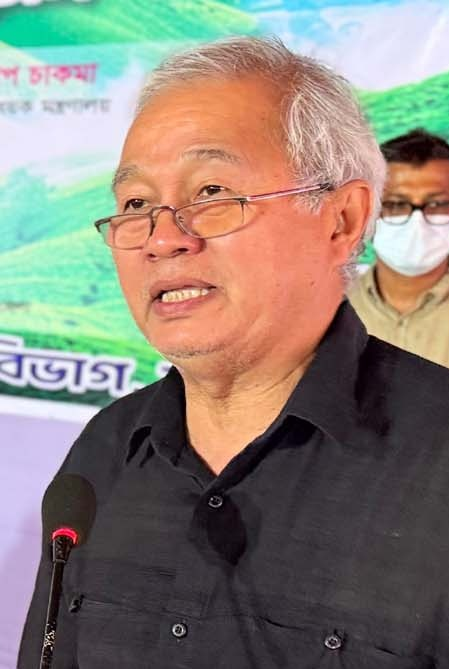
- Chakma in 2025

Adviser for Chittagong Hill Tracts Affairs
- In office 11 August 2024 – 17 February 2026
- President: Mohammed Shahabuddin
- Chief Adviser: Muhammad Yunus
- Preceded by: Bir Bahadur Ushwe Sing
- Succeeded by: Dipen Dewan

Ambassador of Bangladesh to Mexico
- In office 6 December 2014 – 29 August 2021
- President: Mohammad Abdul Hamid
- Preceded by: M. Fazlul Karim
- Succeeded by: Abida Islam

Personal details
- Born: 1961 (age 64–65) Khagrachhari, East Pakistan
- Party: Independent
- Education: University of Dhaka
- Profession: Diplomat

Supradip Chakma (Chakma: 𑄥𑄪𑄛𑄳𑄢𑄧𑄘𑄨𑄛𑄴 𑄌𑄋𑄴𑄟; Bengali: সুপ্রদীপ চাকমা; born 1961) is a Bangladeshi civil servant. He was an adviser to the Interim government of Bangladesh. Chakma was born in 1961 in what is now Khagrachhari District (then in East Pakistan). He studied marketing at Dhaka University.

== Early life ==
Supradip Chakma was born in the Khagrachari Hill District. He completed his SSC from Khagrachari in 1977, HSC in 1979, and obtained his bachelor's degree in Marketing from the University of Dhaka in 1982, followed by a master's degree in 1983.

He is married to Nandita Chakma and they have two children.

== Career ==
He joined the foreign affairs cadre of the Bangladesh Civil Service in 1985. He was ambassador to Vietnam until 2014, when he was made ambassador to Mexico.

On 11 August 2024, Supradip and Bidhan Ranjan Roy took oath as the advisers of the interim government led by Muhammad Yunus. President Mohammed Shahabuddin administered their oath in the Durbar Hall of Bangabhaban. Hailing from the Chakma minority of the country, he is the only non-Bengali & the Buddhist member in the Interim government.
