= Chaithoai Roaza =

Bangladeshi politician (1930–1994)

Member of Parliament for Chittagong Hill Tracts-2
- In office 1973–1975
- Preceded by: Constituency Established
- Succeeded by: Aung Shwe Prue Chowdhury

Personal details
- Born: 16 December 1930
- Died: 9 January 1994 (aged 63)
- Party: Independent

Chaithoai Roaza (16 December 1930 – 9 January 1994) was a Bangladeshi politician from Rangamati. He was a member of the Jatiya Sangsad.

== Biography ==
Roaza was born on 16 December 1930 in Kawkhali, Rangamati. He provided financial help and arms to the freedom fighters of Chittagong during the Liberation War of Bangladesh. He was elected as a member of the Jatiya Sangsad from Chittagong Hill Tracts-2 as an independent candidate in 1973.

Roaza died on 9 January 1994 at the age of 63.
