= Rajguru Priyo Ratana Mahathera =

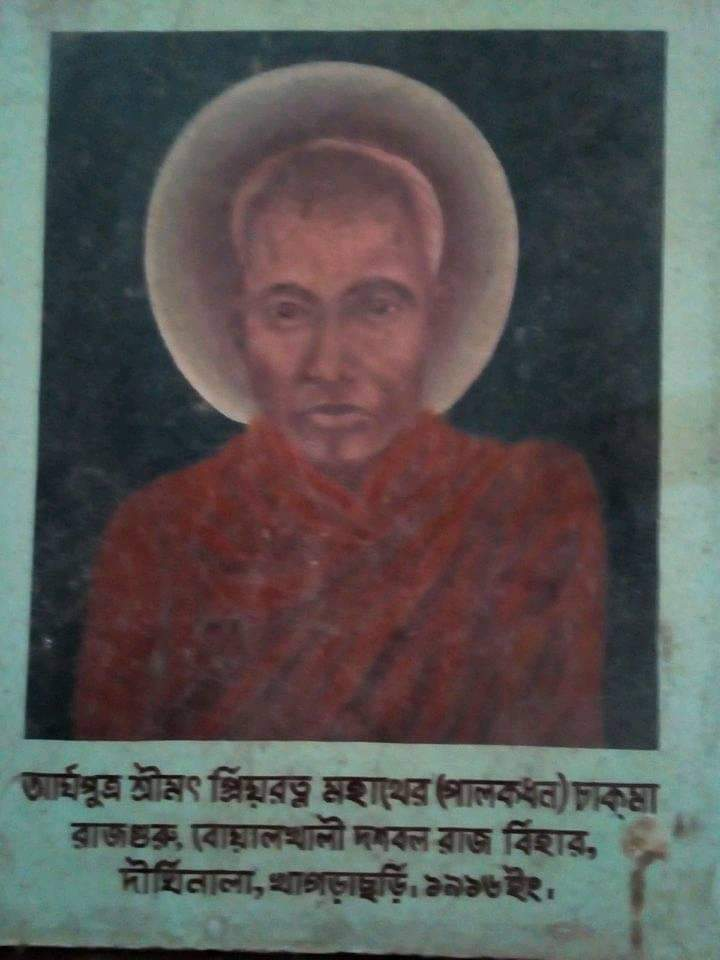
- Rajguru Priyo Ratana Mahathera

Personal life
- Born: 1879 Chittagong Hill Tracts, British India
- Died: 1954 (aged 74–75) Rangamati, East Pakistan
- Occupation: Buddhist Monk

Religious life
- Religion: Buddhism
- School: Theravada

Priyo Ratana Mahāthera was a Buddhist guru entitled the Rajguru in Chakma Raj Bihar and the first known Tanchangya monk who went abroad for Buddhist studies in Sri Lanka in 19th century.

== Early life ==
He was born named Palak Dhan in 1879 to a poor family in Tanchangya tribe. Tanchangya belong to multiple sects Mahāthera belonged to Karva Ghosa. During his childhood his mother died, and he was raised by a Chakma family. His name became Palak Dhan Tanchangya which implies a foster child in Tanchangya.

He became a novice at Chittagong Buddhist Temple. He was an intelligent and obedient student and continued both general and religious study.

He traveled to Ceylon for further Buddhist studies.

== Royal Patriarch ==
In 1935 after the death of Chakma King Bhuvan Mohan Roy, prince Nalinakha Roy was appointed to the throne and Piyaratana was received as a Royal Patriarch.

== Career ==
While he was Royal Patriarch, Hindu practices proliferated. The numbers of monks were fewer than the Luri in the northern part of Chittagong Hill Tracts. The Luri were religious preachers who had left Buddhism. Their lives were like those of laymen, with wives and children. They had become monks to avoid the torture experienced by non-Buddhist rulers, later adopting it as their practice. They followed a "debased" Buddhism, possibly Tantric Buddhism. Their texts deviated from the original Buddhist texts. The Chakma queen Benita Roy was a Hindu and practiced Hindu religious ceremonies. The entire palace worshiped the Sanātana Dharma. Due to the strong practise of Hinduism, Venerable Bhante could not propagate Buddhism there.

== Death ==
He died as a king preceptor in 1954.
