= Debabrata Paul =

Bangladeshi cricketer (born 1978)

Personal information
- Full name: Debabrata Paul
- Born: 28 January 1978 (age 48); Kishoreganj District, Dhaka
- Batting: Right-handed
- Bowling: Right-arm medium-fast
- Role: Batsman, Bowler

Debabrata Barua Paul (Bengali: দেবব্রত বড়ুয়া পাল; born 28 January 1978 in Kishoreganj District, Dhaka) is a Bangladeshi former first-class cricketer active 2001–2003 who played for Chittagong Division and Barisal Division. He was a right-handed batsman and a right-arm medium-fast bowler.
