= Sumon Barua =

Bangladeshi cricketer

Cricket information
- Batting: Right-handed
- Bowling: Right-arm fast-medium

Career statistics
| Competition | First-class | List A |
|---|---|---|
| Matches | 1 | 5 |
| Runs scored | 0 | 43 |
| Batting average | 0 | 8.60 |
| 100s/50s | 0/0 | 0/0 |
| Top score | 0 | 20 |
| Balls bowled | 12 | 233 |
| Wickets | 0 | 7 |
| Bowling average | – | 26.71 |
| 5 wickets in innings | – | 0 |
| 10 wickets in match | – | 0 |
| Best bowling | – | 3/57 |
| Catches/stumpings | 1/– | 1/– |
- Source: CricketArchive, 30 December 2021

Sumon Barua is a first-class and List A cricketer from Bangladesh. A right-handed batsman and right arm medium fast bowler, he played for Chittagong Division in 2001/02. His only first-class match was not a success but in five limited overs games he took a best of 3 for 57 against Dhaka Metropolis and scored 20 runs against the same team.
