= Aung Shwe Prue Chowdhury =

Bangladeshi politician (1914–2012)

Aung Shwe Prue Chowdhury; အောင်ရွှေပြု ချော်ဓူရီ မာမာ
- Raja

King of Bohmong Chiefdom
- Reign: 19 November 1998 – 1 August 2012
- Predecessor: Maung Shwe Prue Chowdhury
- Successor: Kya Sain Prue Chowdhury

Minister of State for Health, Labour and Social Welfare
- In office 12 February 1982 – 24 March 1982
- President: Abdus Sattar
- Prime Minister: Shah Azizur Rahman
- Preceded by: Abu Ahmad Fazlul Karim
- Succeeded by: Shamsul Haque

Minister of State for Posts, Telegraphs, Telephones, Aviation and Tourism
- In office 24 November 1981 – 12 February 1982
- President: Abdus Sattar
- Prime Minister: Shah Azizur Rahman
- Preceded by: KM Obaidur Rahman
- Succeeded by: AKM Maidul Islam

Member of Parliament
- In office 2 April 1979 – 24 March 1982
- Preceded by: Chaithoai Roaza
- Succeeded by: constituency dissolved
- Constituency: Chittagong Hill Tracts-2

Minister for Forest, Cooperatives, Fisheries and Minority of East Pakistan
- In office 17 September 1971 – 14 December 1971
- Governor: Abdul Motaleb Malik
- Administrator: A. A. K. Niazi
- Preceded by: Maung Shwe Prue Chowdhury
- Succeeded by: dissolved

Personal details
- Born: 1 August 1914 Bandarban, British India now Bangladesh
- Died: 8 August 2012 (aged 98) Bandarban, Bangladesh
- Party: Bangladesh Nationalist Party
- Other political affiliations: Pakistan Muslim League
- Children: Sa Ching Prue Jerry
- Relatives: Ma Mya Ching (co-sister-in-law)

Aung Shwe Prue Chowdhury (1 August 1914 – 8 August 2012) was a Bangladeshi politician affiliated with the Bangladesh Nationalist Party. He served as a Member of Parliament and a government minister. He was also the 15th King (Raja) of the Bohmong Circle in Bandarban District.

== Biography ==
Chowdhury was born on 1 August 1914. He was elected as a member of the East Pakistan Legislative Assembly in 1970. He was elected as a member of the Jatiya Sangsad from Chittagong Hill Tracts-2 in 1979. He was also appointed as the state minister of the Ministry of Food.

Chowdhury was appointed as the King of Bohmong Circle on 19 November 1998. He remained as the King of Bohmong Circle till his death.

Chowdhury was married to Abain Prue Chowdhury. They had six sons and two daughters. His son Saching Prue Jerry is a former member of the Jatiya Sangsad. His co-sister-in-law Ma Mya Ching is also a former member of the Jatiya Sangsad.

Chowdury died on 8 August 2012 at the age of 98.

== Controversy ==
Chowdhury collaborated with the Pakistan Army during the Liberation War of Bangladesh. He was made the state minister for cooperative society, fisheries and minority of the cabinet formed by Governor Dr AM Malik on 17 September 1971.
