= Aye Thein Rakhaine =

Bangladeshi politician (born 1962)

Member of Parliament for Reserved Women's Seat-30
- In office 1996–2001

Member of Parliament for Reserved Women's Seat-7
- In office 2009–2014

Personal details
- Born: 16 July 1962 (age 63)
- Party: Bangladesh Awami League
- Occupation: Academic, politician

Aye Thein Rakhaine (Bengali: ইথেন রাখাইন, Bengali pronunciation: [itʰen rakʰain]; born 16 July 1962) is a Bangladeshi academic and politician from Cox's Bazar belonging to the Bangladesh Awami League. She is a former member of the Jatiya Sangsad.

== Biography ==
Aye Thein was born on 16 July 1962. In 1971, she nursed injured freedom fighters during the Liberation War of Bangladesh. She also worked as an organizer during the Liberation War of Bangladesh.

After receiving her post graduate degree, Aye Thein started her career. She taught in college. She was elected as a member of the Jatiya Sangsad from Reserved Women's Seat-30 in 1996 and served till 2001. Later, she was elected as a member of the Jatiya Sangsad from Reserved Women's Seat-7 in 2009.
