= Ushwe Sing =

Bangladeshi politician

Bir Bahadur Ushwe Sing
- বীর বাহাদুর উশৈ সিং
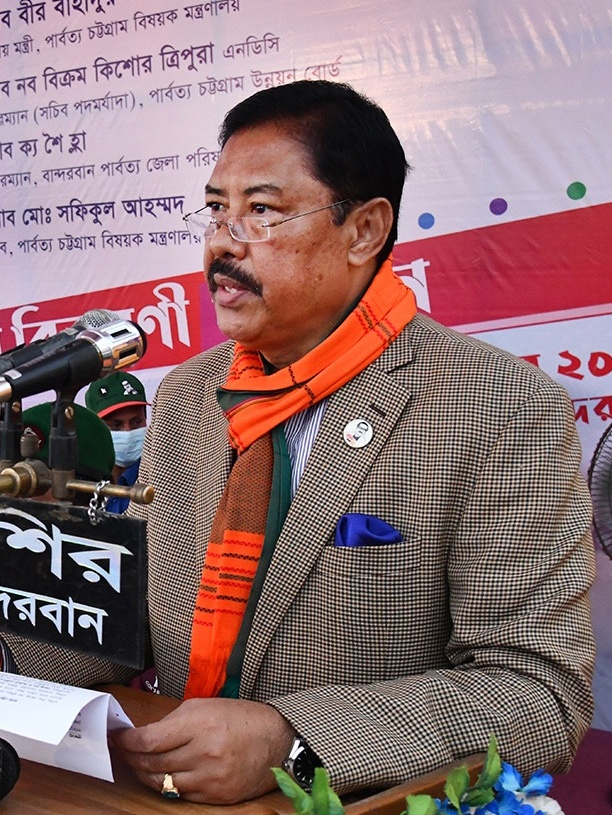

Member of Parliament
- In office 12 June 1996 – 6 August 2024
- Preceded by: Sa Ching Prue Jerry
- Succeeded by: Sa Ching Prue Jerry
- Constituency: Bandarban
- In office 27 February 1991 – 15 February 1996
- Preceded by: Aung Shwe Prue Chowdhury
- Succeeded by: Sa Ching Prue Jerry
- Constituency: Bandarban

Minister of Chittagong Hill Tracts Affairs
- In office 7 January 2019 – 10 January 2024
- Prime Minister: Sheikh Hasina
- Preceded by: Kalparanjan Chakma
- Succeeded by: Supradip Chakma

Minister of State for Chittagong Hill Tracts Affairs
- In office 12 January 2014 – 7 January 2019
- Prime Minister: Sheikh Hasina
- Preceded by: Dipankar Talukder
- Succeeded by: Kujendra Lal Tripura

Personal details
- Born: 10 January 1960 (age 66) Bandarban, East Pakistan, Pakistan
- Party: Bangladesh Awami League
- Spouse: Mehla Prue
- Children: 3
- Education: University of Rajshahi; Chittagong College

Bir Bahadur Ushwe Sing is an Awami League politician. He is from Bandarban district and was elected as a member of parliament from Bandarban constituency for the 7th time in the 12th parliamentary election. He served as the minister of Chittagong Hill Tracts affairs from 2019 to 2024 and State Minister from 2014 to 2019. Following the fall of the Awami League government after the July uprising in 2024 and the dissolution of parliament by President Mohammad Shahabuddin, he lost his parliamentary seat.

== Early life ==
Sing passed the Secondary School Certificate (SSC) examination from Bandarban Government High School in 1976 and later completed his Higher Secondary Certificate (HSC) from Bandarban Government College. In 1983, he obtained a master’s degree in political science from the University of Rajshahi.

== Political career ==
Sing became involved in politics during his student years through the Bangladesh Chhatra League. He served as Office Secretary of the Bandarban unit of the Chhatra League and was elected a member of the presidium of the central committee of the Bangladesh Awami Jubo League.

He was first elected as a member of the Bandarban Hill District Local Government Council in 1979. He was first elected as a member of the Bandarban Hill District Local Government Council in 1979. He was subsequently elected as a Member of Parliament seven times between 1991 and 2024. In 1997, prior to the signing of the Chittagong Hill Tracts Peace Accord, he served as a member of the dialogue committee related to the agreement and as Chairman of the Parliamentary Standing Committee on the Ministry of Civil Aviation and Tourism. In 2002, he was elected Organising Secretary of the central committee of the Awami League and also served as a Whip of the party’s parliamentary group.

He was appointed Chairman of the Chittagong Hill Tracts Development Board in Rangamati in 1998 with the rank of Deputy Minister and was reappointed to the position in 2008 with the rank of State Minister.

In 1998, Sing accompanied former prime minister Sheikh Hasina on an official visit to France in connection with international recognition of the Chittagong Hill Tracts Peace Accord and the awarding of the Félix Houphouët-Boigny Peace Prize. He also travelled to the United States as part of the prime minister’s delegation for the inauguration of the London–New York flight of Biman Bangladesh Airlines and to attend sessions of the United Nations General Assembly. In 2006, he visited China as a member of a delegation of the Bangladesh Awami League at the invitation of the Chinese Communist Party. As a member of the parliamentary panel of speakers, Sing served as Acting Speaker of the Jatiya Sangsad on 22 July 2013.

On 6 June 2020, Sing became the first Bangladeshi minister to contract COVID-19. He was subsequently admitted to the Combined Military Hospital, Dhaka for advanced medical treatment.

After the July Uprising in 2024 and the subsequent dissolution of the parliament by President Mohammad Shahabuddin, Sing lost his seat as a Member of Parliament.

On 5 August 2024 his residence in Bandarban was attacked following reports of former prime minister Sheikh Hasina’s departure from the country. After celebratory processions in the hill district town, a group of agitated individuals set fire to the local office of Awami League and vandalised his residence.

His residence in Bandarban was again set on fire following reports of the death of Inqilab Moncho leader Osman Hadi. According to witnesses, a group of approximately 20 to 25 people first held a brief protest march at a traffic intersection in Bandarban town before moving toward the Rajar Math area, chanting slogans and later setting fire to his house. The army was subsequently deployed to disperse the protesters, after which firefighters brought the blaze under control at around 2:00 a.m., approximately one hour after operations began. By that time, the ground floor of the building had been severely damaged, but the upper floors and nearby structures were unaffected. Two cars and two motorcycles parked on the premises were also destroyed, and police reported that two officers were injured during the incident.

== Sports Administration ==
From 1998 to 2001, Sing served as Senior Vice-President of the Bangladesh Football Federation and as Chairman of the Bangladesh Football Referee Committee. In 1997, he led the Bangladesh national football team delegation to Malaysia for the FIFA World Cup qualification and served as the team’s head. He also acted as Chief of Mission for the Bangladesh team at the 2000 Summer Olympics in Australia.

== Legal History ==
On 6 February 2025, a Dhaka court imposed a travel ban on Sing and his family following an application by the Anti-Corruption Commission (ACC). The ACC stated in its application that Sing was under investigation for allegedly abusing his authority to amass assets worth several crores of taka.

On 3 August 2025, the Anti-Corruption Commission (ACC) filed two separate cases against Sing and his wife, Mehla Prue, alleging the acquisition of illegal wealth worth approximately Tk 11.50 crore and suspicious financial transactions amounting to Tk 74 crore. According to the ACC, its investigation found that Sing had conducted suspicious transactions of nearly Tk 58.41 crore through 13 bank accounts while serving as Minister for Chittagong Hill Tracts Affairs and as a Member of Parliament from Bandarban, including deposits of over Tk 32.16 crore and withdrawals of more than Tk 26.24 crore. The commission also alleged that he possessed illegal assets worth about Tk 9.18 crore. In a separate case, the ACC stated that his wife had conducted suspicious transactions exceeding Tk 15.58 crore through six bank accounts, with deposits of nearly Tk 9.31 crore and withdrawals of over Tk 6.28 crore, and that transactions of more than Tk 3.35 crore were beyond her known sources of income. Sing was named as a co-accused in the case against his wife. The cases were filed under Section 27(1) of the ACC Act 2004, Sections 4(2) and 4(3) of the Money Laundering Prevention Act 2012, and Section 109 of the Bangladesh Penal Code.

== Personal life ==
Sing married Mehla Prue in 1991. The couple has two sons and one daughter. Their eldest son, Robin Bahadur, serves as Deputy Secretary for Religious Affairs of the central committee of the Bangladesh Chhatra League.
