= Bandarban =

Bandarban বান্দরবান
- Municipality
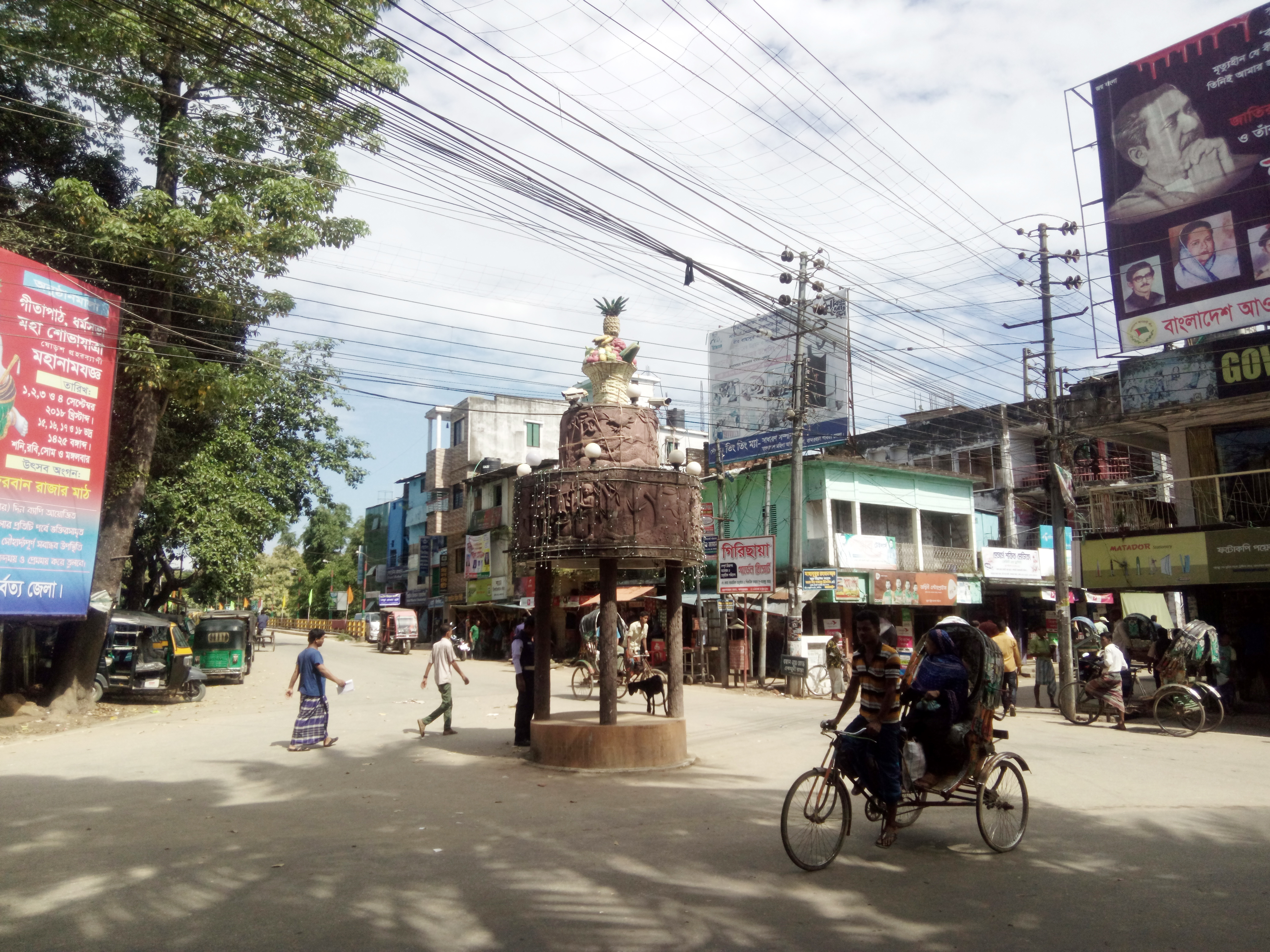
- Statue in Bandarban city

- Location in Chittagong division Location in Bangladesh
- Coordinates: 22.198°N 92.220°E
- Country: Bangladesh
- Region: Chittagong hill tracts
- Division: Chittagong Division
- District: Bandarban
- Upazila: Bandarban Sadar

Government
  - Type: Mayor–Council
  - Body: Bandarban Paurashava

Population (2022)
  - Total: 54,450
- Time zone: UTC+6 (Bangladesh Time)
- National Dialing Code: +880

Bandarban (Bengali: বান্দরবান, lit. 'Forest of monkeys') is a small town in Chittagong Division, Bangladesh. It is the headquarters of Bandarban District. It is located on the Sangu River.

== Demographics ==
According to the 2022 Bangladesh census, Bandarban city had a population of 54,450 and a literacy rate of 85.99%.

=== Religion ===
Religions in Bandarban municipality (2022)
Religion	Percent
Islam	60.77%
Buddhism	21.11%
Hinduism	14.68%
Christianity	3.21%
Other or not stated	0.23%

Population by religion in wards under municipality
Ward No	Islam	Buddhism	Hinduism	Christianity	Others
Ward-1	2,419	1,525	889	214	0
Ward-2	5,586	1,396	608	122	16
Ward-3	2,891	1,395	1,079	724	35
Ward-4	1,209	1,077	656	39	2
Ward-5	715	4,518	813	315	12
Ward-6	6,119	1,226	2,248	372	55
Ward-7	3,356	131	126	20	0
Ward-8	3,785	140	727	41	0
Ward-9	6,369	907	527	32	14

=== Ethnicity ===
Ethnic population was 11,997 (22.02%), of which Marma were 7,272, Tripura were 981, Mru were 400 and 3,344 others.

Ethnicity
1. Bengali (78.0%)
2. Marma (13.4%)
3. Tripura (1.80%)
4. Mro (0.74%)
5. Others (6.14%)

Population by ethnicity in wards under municipality
Ward No	Bengali	Marma	Others
Ward-1	3,556	773	718
Ward-2	6,514	482	732
Ward-3	4,512	652	960
Ward-4	2,123	657	203
Ward-5	1,970	3,575	828
Ward-6	8,628	713	679
Ward-7	3,500	62	71
Ward-8	4,576	43	74
Ward-9	7,074	315	460
