= February 1996 Bangladeshi general election =

- 15 February 1996

300 of the 330 seats in the Jatiya Sangsad 151 seats needed for a majority
- Registered: 56,149,182
- Turnout: 20.97% (▼34.48pp)
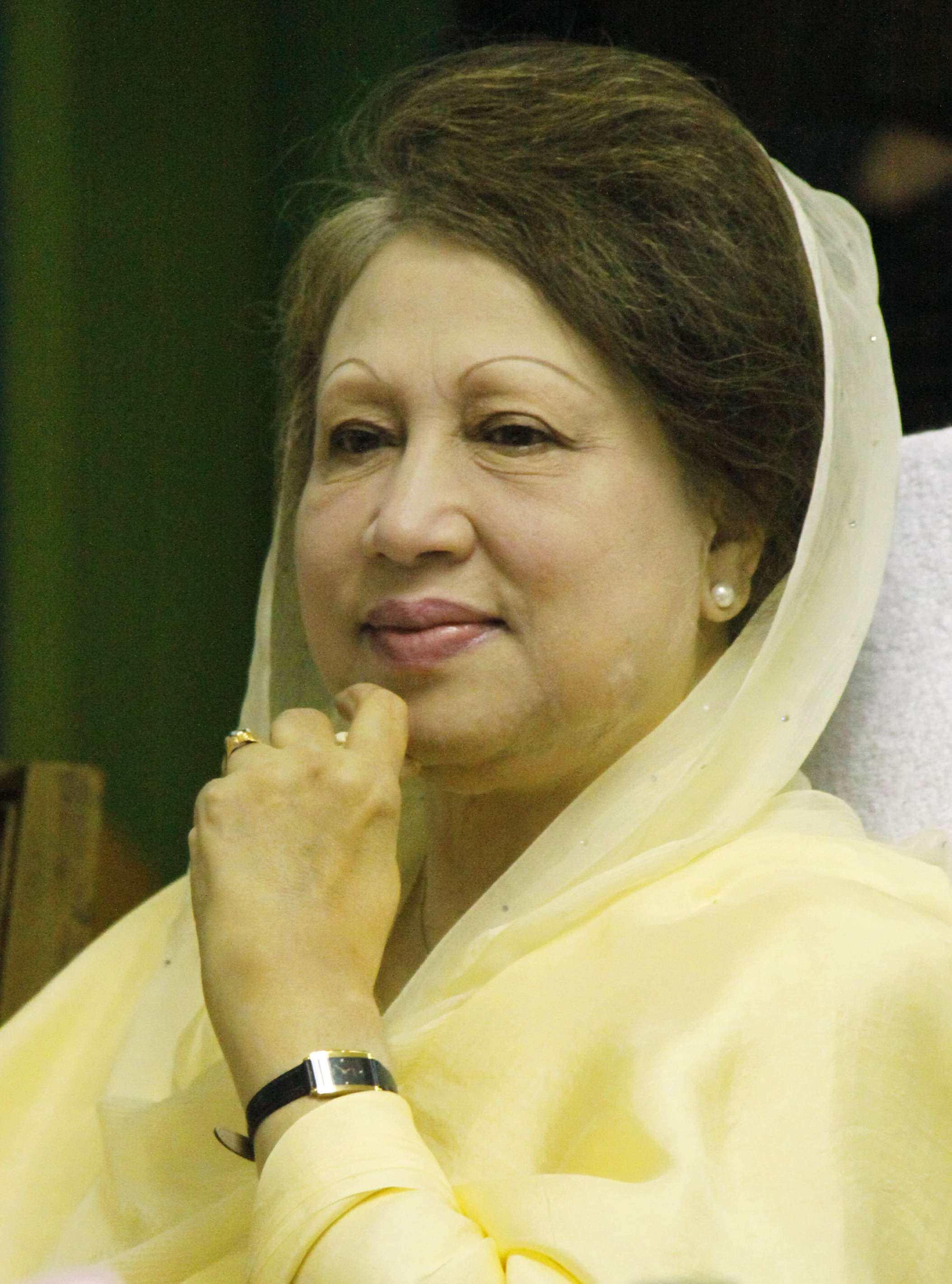
	First party
Leader	Khaleda Zia
Party	BNP
Last election	30.81%, 140 seats
Seats won	278
Seat change	▲138
Prime Minister before election
Khaleda Zia
BNP
Subsequent Prime Minister
Khaleda Zia
BNP

General elections were held in Bangladesh on 15 February 1996. They were boycotted by most opposition parties, and saw voter turnout drop to just 21%. The result was a victory for the Bangladesh Nationalist Party (BNP), which won 278 of the 300 directly elected seats. This administration was short-lived, however, only lasting 12 days before the installation of caretaker government and fresh elections held in June.

The elections were characterized by violence, as well as boycotts by major opposition parties.

== Background ==
In March 1994 controversy over a parliamentary by-election, which the Bangladesh Awami League-led opposition claimed the BNP government had rigged, led to an indefinite boycott of Parliament by the entire opposition. The opposition also began a program of repeated general strikes to press its demand that Khaleda Zia's government resign and that a caretaker government supervise a general election. Efforts to mediate the dispute, under the auspices of the Commonwealth Secretariat, failed. After another attempt at a negotiated settlement failed narrowly in late December 1994, the opposition resigned en masse from Parliament. The opposition then continued a campaign of marches, demonstrations, and strikes in an effort to force the government to resign. The opposition, including the Awami League's Sheikh Hasina, Jatiya Party and Bangladesh Jamaat-e-Islami pledged to boycott national elections scheduled for 15 February 1996.

== Results ==
Incumbent Prime Minister Khaleda Zia's BNP was re-elected for the second term after a landslide victory, but in voting boycotted and denounced as unfair by the three main opposition parties. The voter turnout was the lowest in Bangladesh's parliamentary electoral history at only 21%. Following the election, the President invited Zia to form a government, but this administration was short-lived, lasting only 12 days.

Party	Votes	%	Seats			
Party	Votes	%	General	Women	Total	+/–
Bangladesh Nationalist Party			278	30	308	+140
Bangladesh Freedom Party			1	0	1	+1
Independents			10	0	10	+7
Vacant			11	0	11	–
Total			300	30	330	0
Total votes	11,776,481	–				
Registered voters/turnout	56,149,182	20.97				
Source: Nohlen et al., Kumar Panday

== Aftermath ==
An immediate series of hartals (strikes) were called by the other parties and an indefinite non-cooperation movement was conducted until demands for a new, free election was met. In March 1996, following escalating political turmoil, the sitting Parliament enacted the thirteenth Constitutional amendment installing a neutral caretaker government to assume power and conduct new parliamentary elections; former Chief Justice Muhammad Habibur Rahman was named Chief Advisor (a position equivalent to prime minister) in the interim government. Zia's administration lasted only 12 days. New parliamentary elections were scheduled for June 1996.
