= Bohmong Circle =

Tribal chieftaincy in Bangladesh

Bohmong Circle 𑄝𑄧𑄳𑄠𑄧𑄴𑄟𑄴 𑄇𑄨𑄢𑄴𑄇𑄬𑄣𑄴
- Predecessor: Kya Sain Prue Chowdhury
- Headquarters: Bandarban Hill District
- Location: Bangladesh
- Region served: Chittagong Hill Tracts
- Raja: U Chaw Prue Chowdhury

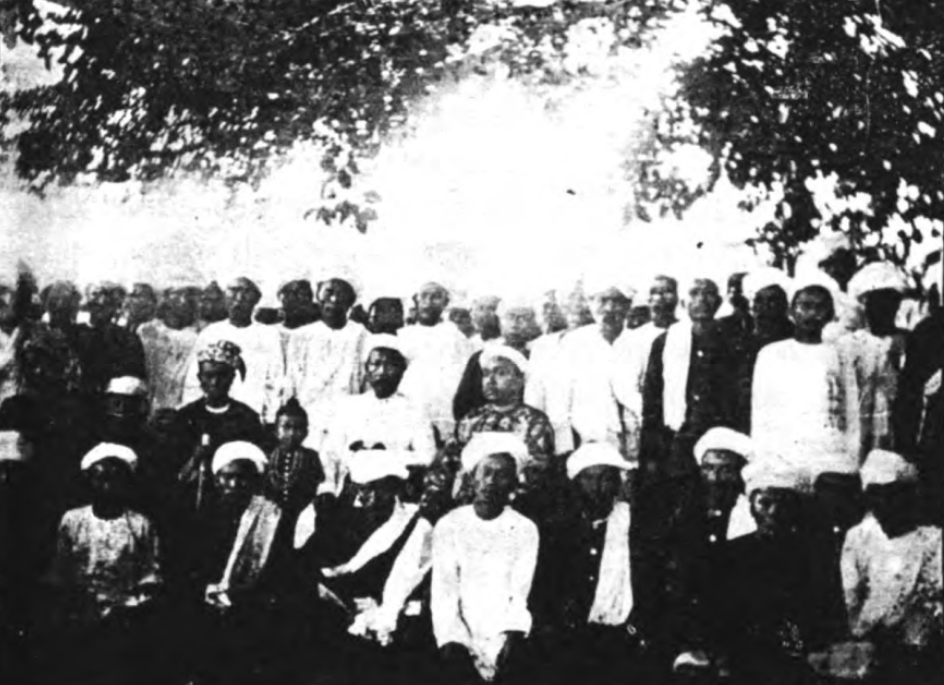
Group of Bandarban Marmas (Maghs) with Bohmong in centre, c. 1906

The Bohmong Circle (Burmese: ဗိုလ်မင်းထောင်) or Bomang Circle (Bengali: বোমাং সার্কেল) is one of three hereditary chiefdoms (or "circles") in the Chittagong Hill Tracts of modern-day Bangladesh. The jurisdiction of the Bohmong Circle encompasses entire Bandarban District, 9 Mouzas of Rajasthali Upazila and 5 Mouzas of Kaptai Upazila of Rangamati District. The chiefdom's members are of Marma descent and are known as ragraisa. Most inhabitants of the Mong Circle settled in the south during a migration wave from the Kingdom of Mrauk U (modern-day Arakan State in Myanmar) between the 16th and 18th centuries, while inhabitants of the other Marma chiefdom, the Mong Circle, settled in the northwest and are known as phalansa (ဖလံသား).

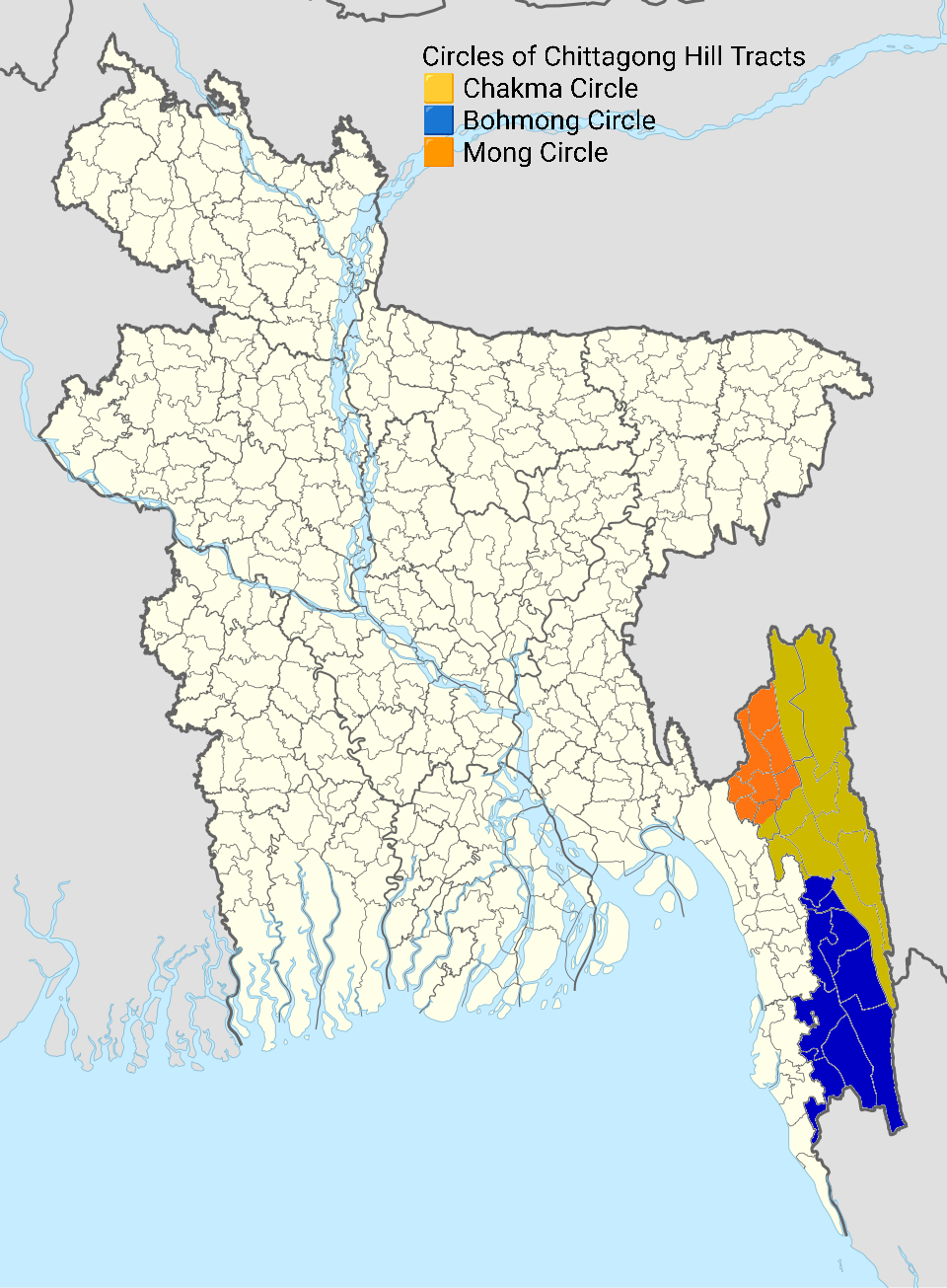
Circles of Chittagong Hill Tracts

== Leadership ==
The Bohmong Circle is led by a hereditary chieftain called a "raja." The Bohmong chieftains appoint and oversee headmen called mouza and village chiefs called karbaris. The incumbent chieftain is Chaw Prue (ချောဖြူ), an engineer by training. The Bohmong chieftain leads an annual three-day festival called "raj punnah," which has been held since 1875. The Bohmong chieftain also sits on the Advisory Council for the Ministry of Chittagong Hill Tracts Affairs and the Bandarban Hill District Council.

In 1975, Circle King Mong Sue Rru Chowdhury was appointed governor of Bandarban District during Bangladesh Krishak Sramik Awami League government.

== History ==
The Bohmong chieftains claim descent from Tabinshwehti and Nanda Bayin of the Toungoo Empire. During British rule, the Chittagong Hill Tracts were administratively divided into three circles in 1884, namely the Chakma Circle, the Bohmong Circle, and the Mong Circles, each presided over by a hereditary chief from the Chakma and Marma peoples. The circles were codified into law with the Chittagong Hill Tract Regulations, 1900, eased revenue collection and administrative burdens on British authorities by delegating tax collection, land administration management and social arbitration responsibilities to the chieftains. In 1901, the Bohmong Circle extended 2,064 square miles (5,350 km^{2}). This administrative structure remained in place until 1964, when the introduction of local self-government abolished the special status of these circles and brought local administration under the control of the central government.
