= One Hundred and One Nations =

Traditional Burmese worldview of ethnic diversity

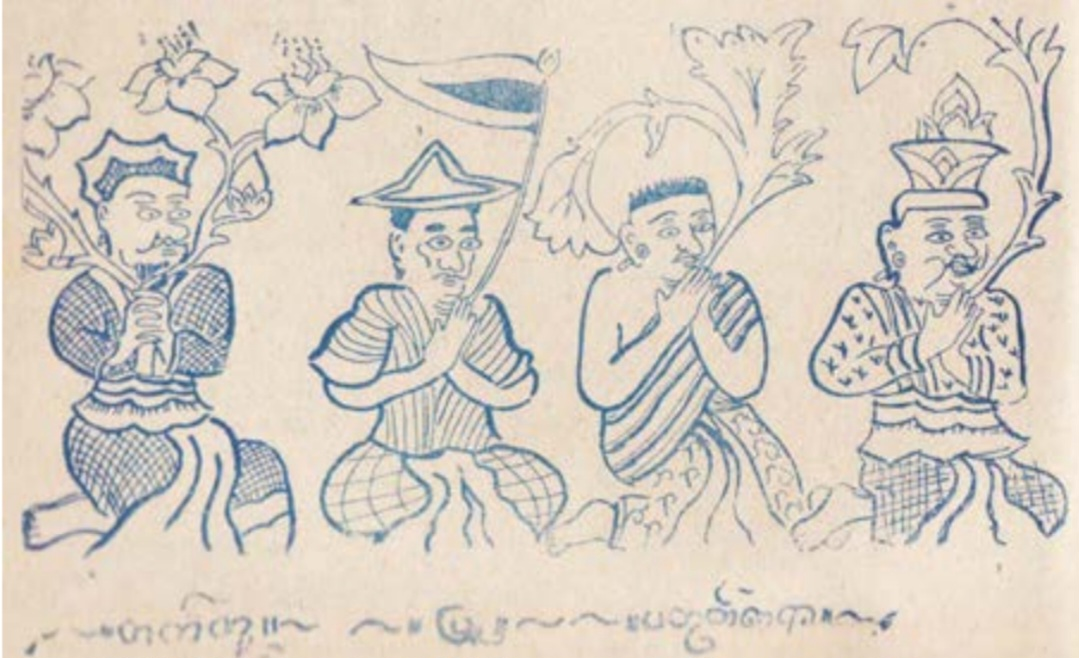
An 18th century Burmese depiction of four ethnicities reckoned among the traditional list of 101 nations

101 Nations (Burmese: လူမျိုး ၁၀၁ ပါး), also translated as 101 Tribes or 101 Ethnicities, is a traditional Burmese catalogue form in which a set of "one hundred and one" ethnic groups are listed together. Originated from Buddhist Jatakas, this cultural motif appears in classical chronicles, folktales, religious sermons and local commemorative texts, and has been used historically as a way to symbolize the world as known to the Burmese people, to record tribute relationships, or to index ethnic diversity under a dynasty. In a way, it is comparable to the role the table of nations play in Judaeo Christianity. Many versions of the list exist, and there are many differences as well as overlaps between them.

== Overview ==
Pali literature, like the Mahā-Ummagga Jātaka and Sutasoma Jātaka, mentions a hundred and one kings or one hundred and one polities that exist in Jambudvīpa. Over time, this term was re-appropriated by Burmese literature by making Burma the religious center of the known world. Thus, the phrase "101 nations" also serves as a rhetorical device to mean "all of humanity" in Burmese language.

== Variants and formats ==
There is no single canonical list of 101 names, although one formulaic verse, "Seven Burmish, four Mon, thirty Tai and sixty Indian constitute 101 nations"( မြန်မာသတ္တ၊မွန်လေးဝနှင့်၊ ရှမ်းကသုံးဆယ်၊ခြောက်ဆယ်ကုလား၊ လူမျိုးတစ်ရာ့တစ်ပါး ), is quite popular. Compilers often adapted the roster to local political realities, religious agendas, or poetic needs. Variants of the list appear in different regions and periods; some versions mix toponyms, tribal names, castes and legendary peoples from Indian literature. Some versions feature further ethnological or racial categorizations, while others do not. The list is attested in the following historical sources:

1. A devotional poem by Shin Own Nyo ( ရှင်အုန်းညို ဂါထာခြောက်ဆယ်ပျို့)
2. Zatadawbon Yazawin
3. Seal of Jambudvipa (ဇမ္ဗူ့တံဆိပ်ကျမ်း)
4. Encyclopedia of Illustrious Answers (စွယ်စုံကျော်ထင်ကျမ်း)
5. Commonplace book of the monk of Mon-yway (မုံရွေးဆရာတော်မှတ်စု)
6. A book by the minister of Shwe-daung (ရွှေတောင်ဝန်မင်းကြီး မဟာမင်းထင်ရာဇာ)
7. Notes left by the count of Taung-Inn (တောင်အင်းစား ငစဉ့်ကူး)
8. Notes left by the assistant officer of foreign affairs (နိုင်ငံခြားဝန်ထောက်မင်း)
9. Notes left by Mayor U Kam-thaa (မြို့အုပ်ဦးကံသာ)
10. Lokahita-rāsī (လောကဟိတ ရာသီကျမ်း)
11. The New Chronicle of Arakan (ရခိုင်ရာဇဝင်သစ်ကျမ်း)
12. The Administration of Burmese Kings by Bagan-U-Tin (မြန်မာမင်းအုပ်ချုပ်ပုံ စာတမ်း)
13. The Tabular Chronicle (အင်းစောက်ရာဇဝင်)

== Shin Own Nyo version ==
The "60-Gathas-pyo" poem (ဂါထာခြောက်ဆယ်ပျို့) is a classic Buddhist devotional poem composed by the 16th century monk-poet Shin Own Nyo (ရှင်အုန်းညို). Despite not featuring all one hundred and one tribes, it is considered to be the earliest local attestation of the list, offering a glimpse of the worldview of the first Ava period. Without any categorization, the poem mentions the following:

1. Puṇṇāḥ (Note: Here, ethnonyms are romanized more or less based on IAST Pāḷi system to emphasize historical orthography) (ပုဏ္ဏား, Brahmins )
2. Mranmā (မြန်မာ, Burmese people)
3. Byāpā (ဗျာပါး or ဗျာပါ )
4. Caṅḥ-kran (စင်းကြန်)
5. Kran Tan (ကြန်တန်)
6. Pyoʔ Gwyamḥ(ပျော့ဂျွမ်း) or Jwamm (ဂျွမ်း; historical raiders from Southeast direction)
7. Kamḥ yaṃ (ကမ်းယံ, ancient Tibeto-Burman ethnicity closely associated with either Pyu or Arakanese people)
8. Prū
9. Mruṃ
10. Sathuṃ
11. Taliuṅḥ i.e. "Talaing" (တလိုင်း, a term for Mon people)
12. Saksāḥ
13. Kulāḥ
14. Panḥ seḥ
15. Kyaññḥ (ကျည်း) or Kraññḥ-liu (ကြည်းလို; a term for South Indians like Keralas and Tamils )
16. Sinḥ-ghiul (သိန်းဃိုဠ်) i.e. Sinhalese people
17. Bāli
18. Bodhi
19. Paṅkā or Baṅkā (ဗင်္ကာ, Bengalis)
20. Saṅḥ-tvaiḥ (သင်းတွဲ; Tagaung Kingdom)
21. *Rap-lhai (ရပ်လှဲ)
22. *Tathūḥ (တထူး)
23. Kantūḥ-Nāḥbhak (ကန္တူး နားဘက်) i.e. Kadu people
24. Tarak (တရက်; a term for Chinese people including Yunnanese ethnic groups)
25. Sūlhī
26. Cālī
27. Abhak (အဘက်)
28. Aip pak (အိပ်ပက်)
29. Caṇḍāḥ (from Chandala )
30. Yiuḥdayāḥ (from Ayutthaya, Siamese people)
31. *saṅ' thoṅ
32. Paloṅ
33. Lava (from Lopburi or Lao or Wa people)
34. Subbha
35. Hramḥ i.e. Shan people
36. Ywanḥ (Tai Yuan)
37. Ūḥpraññḥ (ဦးပြည်း, meaning "bald-headed")
38. Myaknhāmaññḥ (မျက်နှာမည်း, meaning "black-faced")
39. Kasaññḥ
40. Karaṅ
41. Khyaṅḥ
42. Laṅḥ (from Lan Na or Lan Xang).
43. Tanaṅsārī (both Tavoyan people and Moken people)
44. Jawgī (ဇော်ဂီ, supposedly from Yogi)
45. Sippa (သိပ္ပ)
46. Kulāna ( from kula> "clan")

In the above list, entries with asterisks are uncertain as ethnonyms due to possible punctuation errors.

== Zatadawbon version ==
There are two variant lists found in Zatadawbon Yazawin, one of the oldest Burmese royal records. This version is the oldest complete list, enumerating all 101 nations. The list is difficult to be dated due to the complexity of multiple historical layers and editions in the chronicle, but it likely represents the Ava Dynasty or Toungoo dynasty at the very least. Just like Shin Own Nyo, the chronicle does not make any categorization. The first variant lists the following:

1. Mranmā
2. Taliuṅḥ (တလိုင်း)
3. Jamī (possibly Zomi people)
4. Jacā
5. Ywan
6. Manu
7. Kulāḥ (ကုလား)
8. Shyamḥ
9. Pikkarā or Patikkarā (ပတိက္ကရာ, currently known as ပဋိက္ကရား)
10. Sokkatai
11. Thavay
12. Rakhuiṅ
13. Yiuḥdayāḥ
14. Kasaññḥ
15. Sūbha or Subbha
16. Katūḥ
17. Proʔ (possibly Pyu)
18. Tanaṅsārī
19. Laviuk (လဝိုက်, perhaps from Longvek)
20. Uraṃ
21. Kukkai
22. Obhā
23. Mahallakā (possibly from Malacca, Melayu Kingdom )
24. Phaṅjā
25. Nabhai
26. Aṅkyaññ (အင်ကျည်) or Aṅkyay (အင်ကျယ်)
27. Pusata
28. Athā
29. Pricchā
30. Yapā
31. Mruṃ
32. Lava
33. Serā
34. Candāḥ (စန္ဒား; Tsan-da, one of Koshanpye) or Caṇḍāḥ
35. Tarup or *Taruk
36. Tarak
37. Puṇṇāḥ
38. Jogā
39. Jawtat
40. Ammaññtak (အမ္မည်တက်)
41. Toṅla
42. Rānmān or *Rāman (Rāmañña, Mon people)
43. Toṅsū
44. Shyū (possibly Ba-Shyūh, i.e. Malays)
45. Laṅbhe
46. Ta-Kraññ (perhaps, Kraññ, i.e. Dravidian peoples)
47. Tharo (ထရော, possibly Dayo; Yaw people)
48. Tapasī (conflated with Tapas, possibly Pasī, i.e. Persian diaspora)
49. Phussa
50. Rechū (compare Resū)
51. Viyye
52. Laṅ
53. Yintū, or possibly Hintū ( Hindus)
54. Sathuṃ
55. Kraññ ( Dravidian peoples)
56. Panthip (possibly from Pandit )
57. Mālin (မာလိန်)
58. Suttan (possible from Sultan)
59. Jawgī
60. Lahak
61. Pho kyaṃ
62. Kaṃcak
63. La
64. Sūyoṅ
65. Sūloṅ
66. Thin
67. Sūlī or sūlhī
68. Kaṃcī
69. Jāvī
70. Khyaṅ-ʔiu
71. Mrak
72. Bhaloṅ or Paloṅ
73. Bodhijavaṅ
74. Pwyan (ပြွန်)
75. Kwyan ( ကျွန်; maybe the same as ဂျွမ်း "Gwyamḥ")
76. Laṅtoṅ
77. Caṅ kyaṃ (စင်ကျံ, alernatively Caṅkraṃ or Caṅkran )
78. Panḥ Seḥ
79. Remīḥ or Remi
80. Sak
81. Khre Jat
82. Bodhi
83. Resū
84. Laṅtaṃ
85. Black-faced people
86. Bodhitāri
87. Phussarā
88. Khruṃ
89. Laṅmitā
90. Kamḥ-Yaṃ (ကမ်းယံ, ancient people related to either Pyu or Arakan)
91. Kaṃmraṅ or *Kamḥmraṅ ( perhaps closely related ro Kamḥ-Yaṃ )
92. Kakhyaṅ
93. Kyaṃ Jaṅ
94. Karaṅ
95. Shyak (Chakma people)
96. Lahu
97. Layok or *Lahok
98. Laṅsak
99. Hrin-khiu, or rather *Shyin-ghiu ( Sinhalese people )
100. Sarak-Laṅ
101. Paʔūḥ (maybe Pa'O people )

== Moam-yway version ==
A commonplace, written by Shin Ādicca Raṃsī, the monk of Moam-yway (1766–1834), lists the following:

Seven Burmish peoples;

1. Mrammā-sak (မြမ္မာသက်, Burmese people) or Brahmā-sak (ဗြဟ္မာသက်, referring to their mythological descent from Brahma)
2. Rakhaiṅ (ရခိုင်, Arakanese people)
3. Thāḥ-vay (ထားဝယ်, Tavoyan people)
4. Pra-rai (ပြရယ်, traditionally related to Pyu or Pyay)
5. Toṅ Sū (‌တောင်သူ, Pa'O people)
6. Mruṃsak (မြုံသက်) or Mriusak (မြိုသက်, Mru people and Chak people)
7. Kamḥ yaṃ (ကမ်းယံ, ancient Tibeto-Burman ethnicity closely associated with either Pyu or Arakanese people)

Four Mon peoples;

1. Mwan-ti
2. Mwan-ca
3. Mwan-ñña (from Ramañña)
4. Mwan-si

Thirty Tai peoples;

1. Southern Hramḥ i.e. southern Shan people
2. Northern Shan
3. Western Shan
4. Major Ywanḥ (Tai yuan)
5. Minor Ywanḥ
6. Laṅḥ-Jaṅḥ (Lan Xang, i.e.Lao people)
7. Laṅḥ (လင်း)
8. Major Khyaṅḥ (Chin people)
9. Minor Khyaṅḥ
10. Hraiḥ (probably eastern Shan)
11. Karaṅ
12. Kakhyaṅ
13. Kasaññḥ
14. Black-Faced people (မျက်နှာမည်း)
15. Lava (Lopburi or Lao or Wa people)
16. Guṃ (Khün people from Kengtung)
17. ʔū (အူ)
18. Dhanu
19. Aṅkyay (အင်ကျယ်)
20. Khaṇṭhi
21. Katūḥ
22. Sak
23. Tarak (တရက်; a term for Chinese people including Yunnanese)
24. Taruk (တရုက် or တရုတ်; the main term for Chinese people, including Yunnanese)
25. Paloṅ
26. Jabinḥ (ဇဗိန်း)
27. Yiuḥ-da-yāḥ (from Ayutthaya; Siamese people)
28. laviuk or lavaik (လဝိုက်, either from Longvek khmer people or Lopburi-Tai Bueng people)
29. Jabā (from Java; Javanese or Malay people)
30. Akyaw (အကျော်; traditionally identified as Viet-Thái people)

Sixty Indian peoples (organized by their gotra lineage); (Note: The exact term used here is ကုလား (Kulah; "Kalar"). The connotation in this context is neutral, as derived from Pali kula ("clan"), portraying the Indian people as descendants of famous mythological figures)

1. Vasishtha kula or gotra
2. Bharadvaja
3. Gautama
4. Brahmin
5. Kosiya
6. Vāsudeva
7. Bāladeva
8. Vessamitta
9. Vacchāyana
10. Sakaṭāyana
11. taṇhāyana
12. Aggivesāyana
13. Vagacchāyana
14. Kappayana
15. Moggalāyana
16. Muñjāyana
17. Koṇḍañña
18. Lohāyana
19. Sakamayana
20. narāyana
21. cerāyana
22. Avasālāyana or avatārāyana
23. Dvepāyana
24. Kuñjāyana
25. Kaccāyana
26. Kattikeyya
27. Venatheyya
28. Rohaneyya
29. Gaṅgeyya
30. kaddhameyya
31. Nādeyya or Nāteyya
32. Kāmeyya
33. Soceyya
34. āheyya
35. Thāleyya
36. Kālameyya
37. dakkhi
38. Doṇi
39. Sakyaputti
40. Nādaputti
41. Dāsaputti
42. Dāsavaravi
43. Dāruṇi
44. Gaṇḍu
45. Māladevi
46. Pāvaki
47. Jenatti
48. Vāsati
49. Vidavera
50. Bandhuvera
51. Kassapa
52. opakaṃva
53. Mānava
54. Aggava
55. nāḷīkera
56. Not mentioned
57. Not mentioned
58. Not mentioned
59. Not mentioned
60. Not mentioned

== Ramree version ==
By citing earlier sources like Lokīdiṭṭhānugati, the New Chronicle of Arakan listed the following categories:

Seven Burmish peoples;

1. Mranmā-praliuṅ (မြန်မာပြလိုင်)
2. Rakhiuṅ
3. dhāḥvay
4. bharay (ဘရယ်) or *praray
5. toṅsū
6. prolū (ပြောလူ) or proʔ-lū (see earlier lists)
7. Kamḥyaṃ (ကမ်းယံ)

Four Mon peoples;

1. Mwan-ta
2. mwan-ñña
3. mwan-na
4. Mwan-si

Thirty Tai peoples;

1. Shyamḥ
2. Ywanḥ
3. laṅḥ-jaṅḥ
4. khyaṅḥ
5. karaṅ
6. kakhyaṅ
7. kasaññḥ (rather meant to be Ahom people)
8. Black-faced people
9. Minor Mruṃ (မြုံငယ်)
10. Minor Kuṃ (ကုံငယ်)
11. kawthut
12. tarut
13. tarak
14. lahak
15. lahok
16. Sokkatai
17. bhū
18. dhanu
19. prū
20. laviuk (လဝိုက်, see earlier list)
21. lavā (လဝါ, see လဝ)
22. aṅkyaṅ (အင်ကျင်)
23. aṅkyay (အင်ကျယ်)
24. paloṅ
25. Yiuḥdayāḥ
26. katūḥ
27. sak
28. japinḥ (ဇပိန်း) or jabinḥ (ဇဗိန်း)
29. japā (ဇပါ, probably from Java )
30. tanaṅsārī (Moken and Tavoyan peoples)

Sixty Indian peoples;

1. kalay or Kalai (ကလယ်)
2. pasī (Persians)
3. Bharaṅgyī (ဘရင်ဂျီ; Europeans, especially the Portuguese and Roman Catholics)
4. jawgī
5. mālī (related to Malayalis?)
6. bhawrī
7. hindū
8. rechū
9. sokut
10. lahut
11. dorāḥ
12. puṇṇāḥ
13. bashyūḥ (ဗသျှူး)
14. tathūḥ khantī
15. tapasī (တပသီ)
16. hārī
17. lāka
18. vesākha
19. Paṭiccayā (same as paṭikkarāḥ, ပဋိက္ကရား)
20. uccayāka
21. canda
22. caṅkraṃ (စင်ကြန်, see earlier list)
23. suttaṃ or suttan (compare Sultan)
24. byāpā (vyapari?)
25. micchā-^chakai (compare Mleccha)
26. Ūḥprai (ဦးပြဲ) or *Ūḥpraññḥ (ဦးပြည်း, "bald-headed" people)
27. Aimkap
28. kalap
29. doṇa
30. maccha (maybe related to macchagiri မစ္ဆဂီရိ; an ancient polity in the west of Burma)
31. dolā
32. dāraka
33. panthe (same as panḥseḥ)
34. mante
35. khrekhyut
36. hindhut
37. labhai
38. saṅḥtvai
39. sathuṃ
40. ^mhatyuṃ
41. soyā
42. doraṇā
43. lentikā
44. tobhā
45. palavā (related to either Pallavas or Pahlavas)
46. khantī (probably either Khamti people or Kirati people)
47. kālī
48. kramḥ-tan (lit. "Brute")
49. jahutan
50. sutaṃ (compare suttaṃ)
51. kalaṃ
52. jawhanaṃ
53. paṇḍit
54. titka
55. recha
56. phusa
57. bhaṅgālī
58. bārāṇasī
59. sinḥ-khiu
60. Aṅgalip or Aṅgaliṣ (The English people)

== Historical and scholarly interpretations ==
The Burmese tend to categorize ethnic groups based on either physical or geographical features. For example, both Chinese people, Kachin people, Karen people are reckoned among Tai peoples (ရှမ်း), despite the underlying linguistic and cultural differences. Throughout the age of colonialism, European people were called "white kalars" (ကုလားဖြူ; Kulāḥ Phrū) ‌and thus listed in the same category with other Indo-aryan and Dravidian peoples.

== Modern usage and legacy ==
In the modern period, the phrase may appear in local histories, museum exhibits, and cultural revival projects. Some scholars and communities often reinterpret the lists for identity politics, nationalism or heritage displays.

== See also ==
- Ethnic groups in Myanmar
- Burmese chronicles
- List of ethnic groups in Asia
