= Jingpho–Luish languages =

Group of Sino-Tibetan languages belonging to the Sal branch

Jingpho–Luish
- Kachin–Luic
- Geographic distribution: Northeast India, Bangladesh, Myanmar
- Linguistic classification: Sino-Tibetan: Tibeto-Burman; Sal; Jingpho–Luish
- Subdivisions: Jingpho (Kachin); Luish (Asakian)

Language codes
- Glottolog: jing1259

The Jingpho-Luish, Jingpho-Asakian, Kachin–Luic, or Kachinic languages are a group of Sino-Tibetan languages belonging to the Sal branch. They are spoken in northeastern India, Bangladesh and Myanmar, and consist of the Jingpho (also known as Kachin) language and the Luish (a.k.a. Asakian) languages Sak, Kadu, Ganan, Andro, Sengmai, and Chairel. Ethnologue and Glottolog include the extinct or nearly extinct Taman language in the Jingpo branch, but Huziwara (2016) considers it to be unclassified within Tibeto-Burman.

James Matisoff (2013) provides phonological and lexical evidence in support of the Jingpho-Asakian (Jingpho–Luish) grouping, dividing it into two subgroups, namely Jingphoic and Asakian. Proto-Luish has been reconstructed by Huziwara (2012) and Matisoff (2013).

Jingpho–Luish languages contain many sesquisyllables.

== Classification ==
Matisoff (2013), citing Huziwara (2012), provides the following Stammbaum classification for the Jingpho-Asakian (Jingpho-Luish) branch. Jingphoic internal classification is from Kurabe (2014).

- Jingpho-Asakian (Jingpho-Luish)
  - Jingphoic
    - Southern: Standard Jingpho, Nkhum, Shadan, Gauri, Mengzhi, Thingnai dialects
    - Northern
      - Northeastern: Dingga, Duleng, Dingphan, Jilí (Dzili), Khakhu, Shang, Tsasen dialects
      - Northwestern (Singpho): Diyun, Numphuk, Tieng, Turung dialects
  - Asakian
    - Cak
      - Cak
      - Sak
    - Chairel
    - Loi
      - Sengmai
      - Andro
    - Kadu
      - Ganan
      - Kadu

== Bibliography ==
- George van Driem (2001). Languages of the Himalayas: An Ethnolinguistic Handbook of the Greater Himalayan Region. Brill.
