= Naikhongchhari =

Naikhongchhari may refer to:

- Naikhongchhari Upazila, an upazila of Bandarban District
- Naikhongchhari Sadar Union, a union of Naikhongchhari Upazila under Bandarban District
