= Sonaichhari Union =

Union of Bandarban District, Chittagong, Bangladesh

Sonaichhari সোনাইছড়ি
- Union
- Interactive map of Sonaichhari
- Country: Bangladesh
- Division: Chittagong Division
- District: Bandarban District
- Upazila: Naikhongchhari Upazila

Area
  - Total: 17.24 km^{2} (6.66 sq mi)

Population (2022)
  - Total: 7,442
  - Density: 431.7/km^{2} (1,118/sq mi)
- Time zone: UTC+6 (BST)
- Postal code: 4660
- Website: sonaychariup.bandarban.gov.bd

Sonaichhari Union is a union parishad of Naikhongchhari Upazila in Bandarban District, Chattogram Division, Bangladesh.

== Demography ==
According to 2022 census, the total population of the Union is 7,442. Among them 3,754 are Muslim, 3,662 are Buddhist, 25 are Christian, and 1 is Hindu.

Religion-2022
1. Islam (50.4%)
2. Buddhism (49.2%)
3. Christianity (0.34%)
4. Hinduism (0.01%)
5. Others (0.00%)

== Ethnicity ==
This Union is home to a variety of different ethnic groups. Among them are 3,939 Bengali, 2,679 Marma, and 824 of other ethnic groups.

Ethnicity-2022
1. Bengali (52.9%)
2. Marma (36.0%)
3. Chak and Others (11.2%)
