= Chairel language =

Extinct Sino-Tibetan language of Manipur

Chairel
- Chairen
- ꯆꯥꯏꯔꯦꯜ/ꯆꯥꯏꯔꯦꯟ
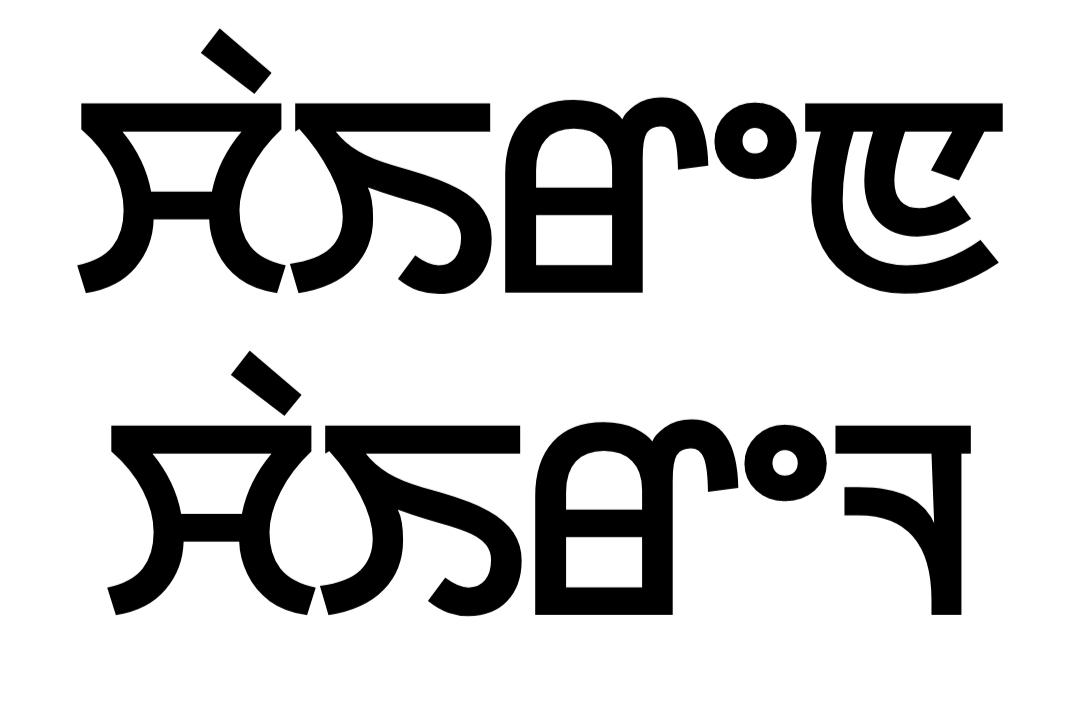
- Classical Meetei Mayek script transliteration of the word "Chairen" and its variant "Chairel"
- Native to: India
- Region: Manipur
- Ethnicity: assimilated into the Meitei ethnicity
- Era: attested 1859
- Language family: Sino-Tibetan: Central Tibeto-Burman?; Sal?; Jingpho–Luish?; Luish?; Chairel

Language codes
- ISO 639-3: None (mis)
- Glottolog: chai1254

Chairel (ꯆꯥꯏꯔꯦꯜ), also spelled as Chairen (ꯆꯥꯏꯔꯦꯟ), is an extinct Sino-Tibetan language of Manipur, India. It is preserved notably in a word list from 1859, alongside the Chakpa language. Chairel speakers have undergone linguistic shifting to Meitei language.

== Classification ==
Benedict (1972) notes that the words sal 'sun' and phal 'fire' are shared with the Boro–Garo, Konyak, and Jingpho–Luish languages, which are said to constitute the Sal languages.

Matisoff (2013) argues that Chairel belongs to the Luish languages.

Huziwara (2014) argues that Chairel lacks important characteristics of other Luish languages, a position maintained in Huziwara (2020).

Van Driem (2014) accepts Chairel's placement within Jingpho–Luish (referred to in his paper as "Kachinic"), though is agnostic about Jingpho–Luish's relation to Boro–Garo and Konyak.
