= Ghumdhum Union =

Union of Bandarban District, Chittagong, Bangladesh

Ghumdhum ঘুমধুম
- Union
- Interactive map of Ghumdhum
- Country: Bangladesh
- Division: Chittagong Division
- District: Bandarban District
- Upazila: Naikhongchhari Upazila

Area
  - Total: 64.75 km^{2} (25.00 sq mi)

Population (2022)
  - Total: 17,707
  - Density: 273.5/km^{2} (708.3/sq mi)
- Time zone: UTC+6 (BST)
- Postal code: 4660
- Website: gumdhumup.bandarban.gov.bd

Ghumdhum Union is a union of Naikhongchhari Upazila under Bandarban District.

== Demography ==
According to 2022 census, total population of the Union are 17,807. Among them, 13,530 are Muslim, 4,017 are Buddhist, 156 are Hindu, 3 are Christian and 1 are others.

Religion-2022
1. Islam (76.4%)
2. Buddhism (22.7%)
3. Hinduism (0.88%)
4. Christianity (0.02%)
5. Others (0.00%)

== Ethnicity ==
This Union is home to a variety of different ethnic groups. Among them, 15,342 are Bengali, 133 are Marma and 2,233 are of others ethnic groups.

Ethnicity-2022
1. Bengali (86.6%)
2. Marma (0.75%)
3. Chak and Others (11.6%)
