= Dochhari Union =

Union of Bandarban District, Chittagong, Bangladesh

Dochhari দোছড়ি
- Union
- Interactive map of Dochhari
- Country: Bangladesh
- Division: Chittagong Division
- District: Bandarban District
- Upazila: Naikhongchhari Upazila

Area
  - Total: 176.12 km^{2} (68.00 sq mi)

Population (2022)
  - Total: 9,647
  - Density: 54.78/km^{2} (141.9/sq mi)
- Time zone: UTC+6 (BST)
- Postal code: 4660
- Website: duwchariup.bandarban.gov.bd

Dochhari Union is a union parishad of Naikhongchhari Upazila in Bandarban District, Chittagong Division, Bangladesh.

== Demography ==
According to the 2022 Bangladeshi census, Dochhari Union had a population of 9,647 Among them, 7,419 are Muslim, 2,065 are Buddhist, 154 are Christian, 5 are Hindu and 4 are others.

Religion-2022
1. Islam (76.9%)
2. Buddhism (21.4%)
3. Christianity (1.60%)
4. Hinduism (0.05%)
5. Others (0.04%)

== Ethnicity ==
This Union is home to a variety of different ethnic groups. Among them, 7,468 are Bengali, 1,601 are Mru, 167 are Marma, 149 are Tripura and 262 are of others ethnic groups.

Ethnicity-2022
1. Bengali (77.4%)
2. Mru (16.6%)
3. Marma (1.73%)
4. Tripura (1.54%)
5. Chak and Others (2.72%)
