= Sak language =

Sino-Tibetan language of Myanmar and Bangladesh

Sak
- Cak
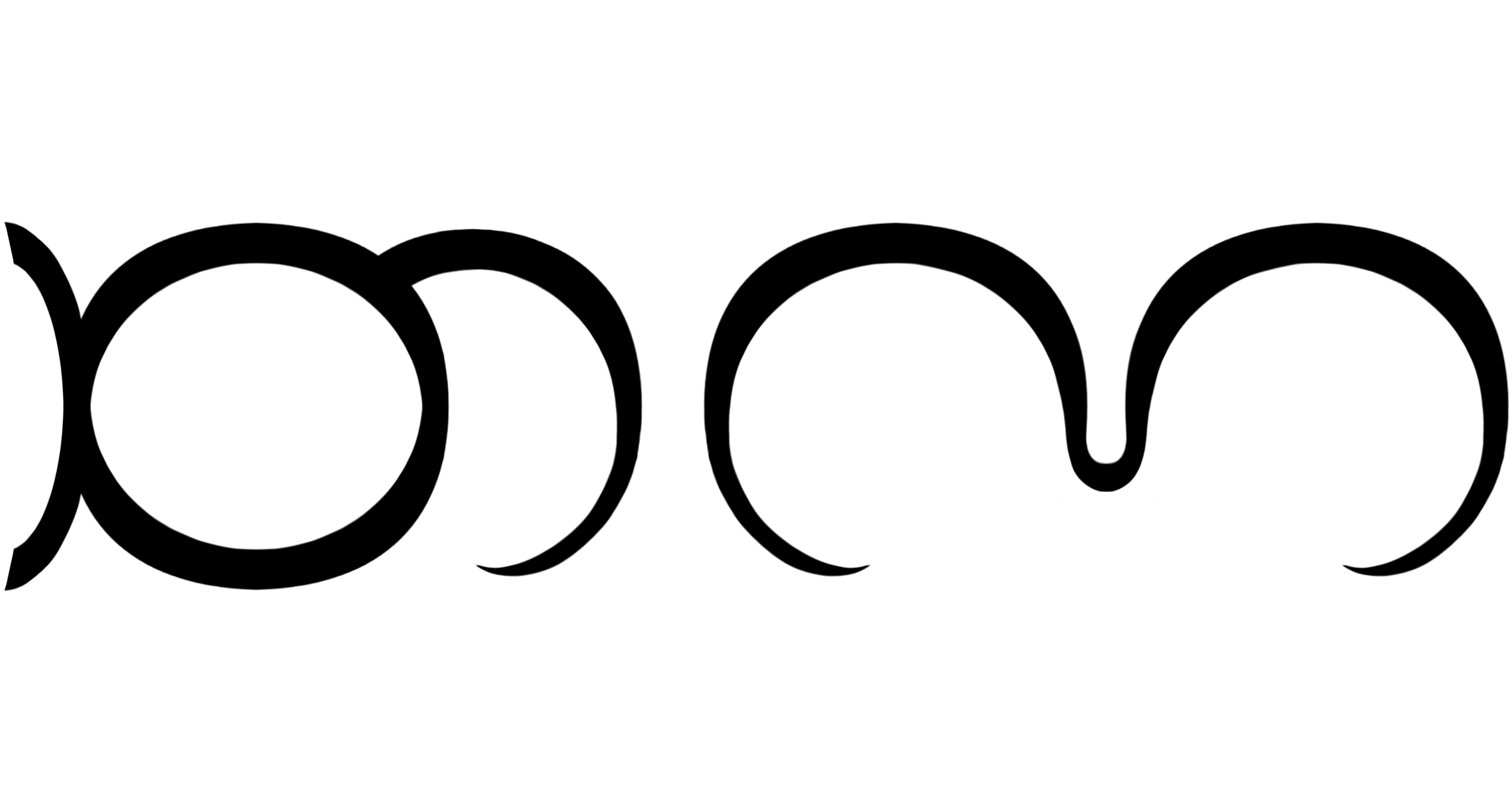
- "Cak" written in the Cak script
- Native to: Bangladesh, Myanmar
- Region: Chittagong Hill Tracts; Northwestern Rakhine State
- Ethnicity: Chak
- Native speakers: 4,000 (2007)
- Language family: Sino-Tibetan: Tibeto-Burman; Sal; Jingpho–Luish; Luish; Sak
- Writing system: Cak script

Language codes
- ISO 639-3: ckh
- Glottolog: sakk1239

Sak (also known as Cak, Chak, or Tsak) is a Sino-Tibetan language of the Sal branch spoken in Bangladesh and Myanmar by the Chak people.

== Geographical distribution ==
Cak is spoken in Bangladesh by about 3,000 people and in Rakhine State, Burma by about 1,000 people according to Ethnologue. In Bangladesh, Cak is spoken in Baishari, Naikhyongchari, and Dochari (Huziwara 2018). In Rakhine State, Burma, Sak is spoken in Maungdaw, Buthidaung, Rathedaung, and Mrauk U townships (Huziwara 2018). The Baishari dialect is the most conservative one (Huziwara 2018).

According to Ethnologue, in Bangladesh, Chak is spoken in 14 villages in:

- Chittagong Division: Baishari, Bandarban, Bishar Chokpra
- Southern Naikhongchari area in the Arakan Blue Mountains

Sak language traditional song

== Phonology ==
=== Consonants ===
		Labial	Dental/ Alveolar	Palatal	Velar	Glottal
Plosive	voiceless	p	t		k	ʔ
Plosive	aspirated	pʰ	tʰ		(kʰ)	
Plosive	voiced	b	d		ɡ	
Plosive	implosive	ɓ	ɗ			
Affricate	voiceless		ts			
Affricate	aspirated		(tsʰ)			
Affricate	voiced		dz			
Fricative	voiceless	f	s	ʃ		h
Fricative	voiced	v				
Tap			ɾ			
Nasal		m	n	(ɲ)	ŋ	
Approximant		(w)	l	j		

- Sounds /tsʰ, kʰ, w/ mainly occur from loanwords.
- /ts, tsʰ, dz/ is also heard as [tʃ, tʃʰ, dʒ] among other dialects.
- [ɲ] occurs as a realization of the consonant sequence /ŋj/.

=== Vowels ===
	Front	Central	Back	
Close	i	ɨ	ɯ	u
Mid	e	(ə)	o	
Open		a		

- [ə] only occurs in minor syllables or as a result of vowel reduction of /a/.

== Numerals ==
Sak uses a decimal-based numeral system. Sak uses two sets of numerals: an indigenous system, and another system borrowed from Arakanese, often used for numbers beyond ten.

== Writing system ==
A new script for the Sak language was devised by Mong Mong Cak and disseminated in 2013. Previously, Bengali and Burmese scripts were used on an ad hoc basis. The Cak script is a Brahmic-style abugida with 33 consonants and 11 vowels represented.
