= Kadu language =

Sino-Tibetan language of Burma

Kadu
- Asak
- Native to: Myanmar
- Region: Sagaing Region
- Ethnicity: Kadu
- Native speakers: 30,000 (2007)
- Language family: Sino-Tibetan: Tibeto-Burman; Sal; Jingpho–Luish; Luish; Kadu
- Dialects: Mawteik; Settaw; Mawkhwin

Language codes
- ISO 639-3: zkd
- Glottolog: kadu1254
- ELP: Kadu

Kadu consonants and vowels video

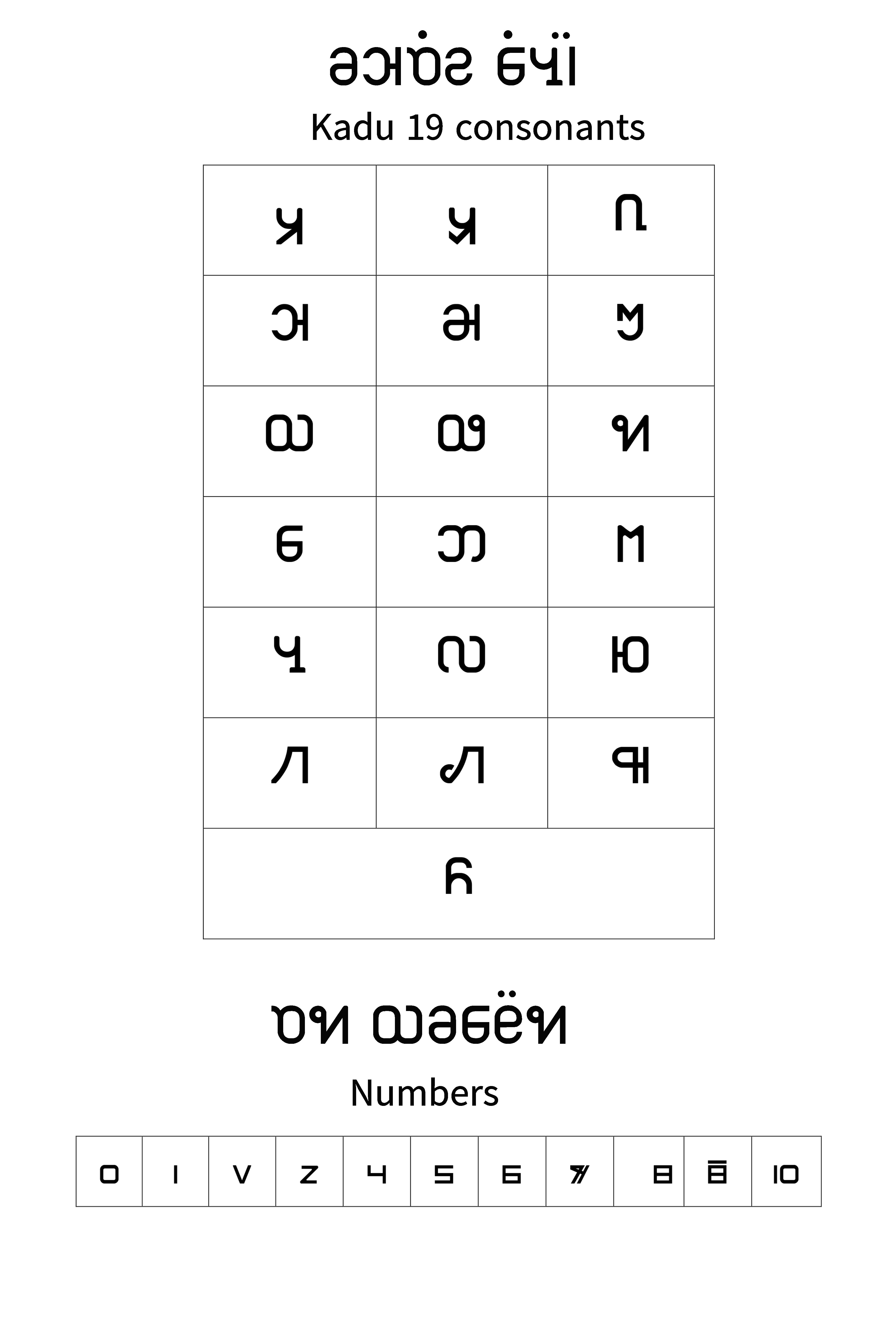
Kadu 19 consonants

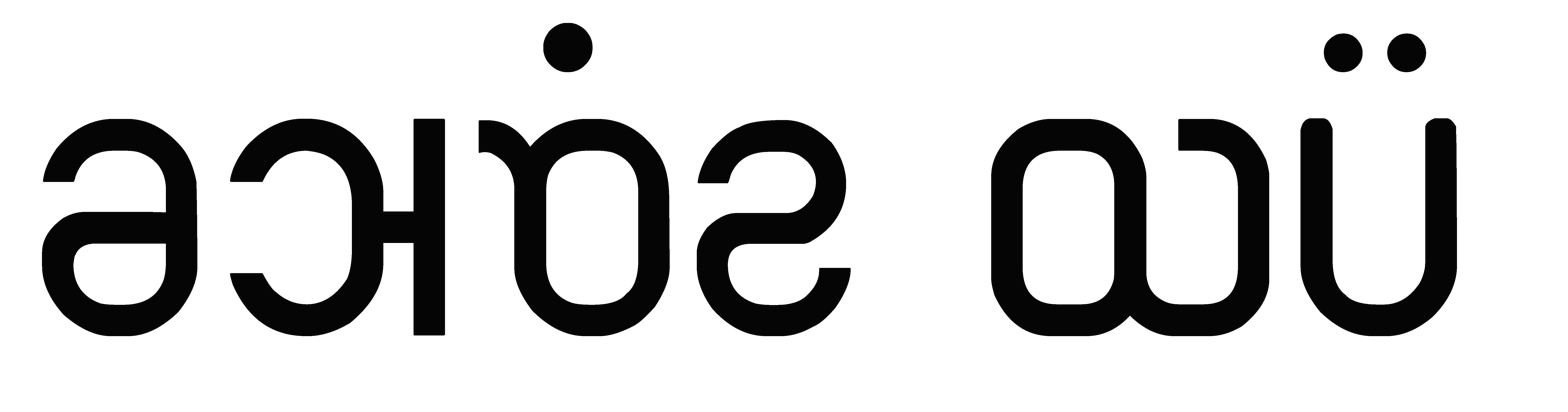
Kadu, Kado, or Asak (Kadu: ), is a Sino-Tibetan language of the Sal branch spoken in Sagaing Region, Myanmar by the Kadu people. Dialects are Settaw, Mawkhwin, and Mawteik [extinct], with 30,000 speakers total. Kadu is considered an endangered language, and is closely related to the Ganan and Sak languages.

== Names ==
Alternate names for Kadu listed in Ethnologue are Gadu, Kado, Kadu-Ganaan, Kantu, Kato, Kudo, Maw, Mawteik, Puteik, and Thet; the autonym is Asak.

== Geographical distribution ==
Statistics for Kadu-speaking villages are as follows:

- Over 30 villages speaking the Mawteik dialect (nearly extinct)
- Over 30 villages speaking the Settaw dialect
- 5 villages speaking the Mawkhwin dialect

The speakers of the Kadu language live in Banmauk, Indaw, and Pinlebu, which are three townships in the Katha District, Sagaing Region, Myanmar. Among these three, Banmauk has the largest Kadu-speaking population and Pinlebu has the smallest Kadu-speaking population. Many Kadu speakers have shifted to Burmese or are bilingual in Burmese.

There is low mutual intelligibility among the Mawkhwin, Settaw, and Mawteik dialects of Kadu. Settaw and Mawteik share 95 to 98% mutual intelligibility, while Mawkhwin Kadu and other Kadu varieties share 91 to 93% lexical similarity. Kadu shares 84%–89% lexical similarity with Kanan.

== History ==
The Kadu were the dominant ethnic group in the Chindwin River valley at the beginning of the early 2nd millennium A.D. until the Chin people and subsequently the Shan people migrated into the Chindwin Valley.

== Phonology ==
=== Vowels ===
Kadu vowels consist of eight monophthongs and a diphthong /ai/.

	Front	Central	Back
Close	i		u
Close-mid	e	ɘ	o
Open-mid	ɛ		ɔ
Open		a	

=== Consonants ===
Kadu has 20 consonants.

	Bilabial		Alveolar		Alveolo-palatal		Palatal	Velar		Glottal
	plain	aspirated	plain	aspirated	plain	aspirated	Palatal	plain	aspirated	Glottal
Stop	p	pʰ	t	tʰ				k	kʰ	ʔ
Affricate					t͡ɕ	t͡ɕʰ				
Fricative			s	sʰ	ɕ					h
Nasal	m		n				ɲ	ŋ		
Approximant			l				j	w		

The final consonants need to be nasals /m, n, ŋ/ or voiceless stops /p, t, k, ʔ/.

=== Tone ===
Kadu has three tones; high, mid, and low.

=== Syllabic structure ===
C_{1}C_{2}V_{1}V_{2}C_{3}

C: Consonant

V: Vowel

C_{1}: necessary, this can be any Kadu consonant except unvoiced nasals.

C_{2}: optional, this can be only /l, w, y/.

V_{1}: necessary, this can be any Kadu vowel, however, /ɘ/ appears only in the form of CɘC.

V_{2}: optional.

C_{3}: optional, this can be only /p, t, m, n, ʔ, ŋ/.

== Orthography ==
=== Consonants ===
Kadu has 19 consonants

k IPA: /ka˨˦/	kh IPA: /kʰa˨˦/	ṅ IPA: /ŋa˨˦/
c IPA: /sa˨˦/	ch IPA: /sʰa˨˦/	ñ IPA: /ɲa˨˦/
t IPA: /ta˨˦/	th IPA: /tʰa˨˦/	n IPA: /na˨˦/
p IPA: /pa˨˦/	ph IPA: /pʰa˨˦/	m IPA: /ma˨/
y IPA: /ja˨˦/	l IPA: /la˨˦/	v IPA: /wa˨˦/
ky IPA: /tɕ˨˦/	khy IPA: /tɕʰ˨˦/	sh IPA: /ɕa˨˦/
	h IPA: /ha˨˦/	

== Grammar ==
Kadu is an SOV language.

=== Nouns ===
Abstract nouns such as freedom, love, experience, and anger are not attested in the Kadu noun class. They are usually expressed by verbs or adjectival verbs.

The language has two categories of nouns:

1, So called "simple nouns" are treated as monomorphemic by the native speakers.

2, Nouns known as "complex nouns" are polymorphemic, and most of the complex nouns come from the process of compounding.

=== Verbs ===
Adjectives that expresses dimensions and qualities such as "tong" (=big) and "lom" (=warm) function as verbs, and are categorized as verbs.

The verbs are structurally categorized as:

1, Simple verbs, which are treated as monomorphemic words by the native speakers.

and

2, Polymorphemic complex verbs.

Kadu verbs may be reduplicated using the same morpheme or may take attendant words to express the repeated or frequent actions.

V-V constructions function as resultative, directional, evaluative, explanatory, or manner.

=== Adverbs ===
The adverbs are also "simple" or "complex" like nouns and verbs.

One thing to point up is that the complex adverbs are derived from verbs or nominals by the processes of reduplication or semi-reduplication.

=== Numerals ===
0	1	2	3	4	5	6	7	8	9	10

Kadu has retained native numerals for only the numerals one, two, three, and four. Other numerals have been supplanted by Tai Laing and Burmese numerals.

Numerals are always attached to classifiers, although classifiers do not occur with multiples of ten.

As for ordinal numbers, Burmese ordinal numbers are used because the original ordinal numbers are already lost.

=== Pronouns ===
	singular	plural
1st person	nga	maleq
2nd person	nang	haning
3rd person	hing	antak, matak

=== Quantifiers ===
Quantifiers follow the head noun they quantify.

=== Particles ===
There are nominal relational markers, verbal particles, clausal particles, utterance final particles, and speaker attitude particles.

=== Interrogatives ===
==== Yes/no interrogatives ====
Yes/no questions are formed by simply adding either of the two interrogative particles "la" and "ka" at the end of the phrase.

==== Alternative questions ====
Yes/no questions can also be expressed by an alternative interrogative expression like "is it A or not A", which can be found in Mandarin Chinese as well.

==== Tag questions ====
Interrogative sentences can be made by adding "chi" (=true) at the end of sentences, like "right?" in English language.

==== Wh- questions ====
Wh- questions are formed by attaching the Wh-word forming morphemes, " ma" or " ha", to specific nomials or nominal postpositions.

Wh- question words also may function as indefinite pronouns such as "whatever", "anyone" and so on.

=== Negation ===
Verbs can be negated by negative proclitics, "a-" and "in-".

== Words ==
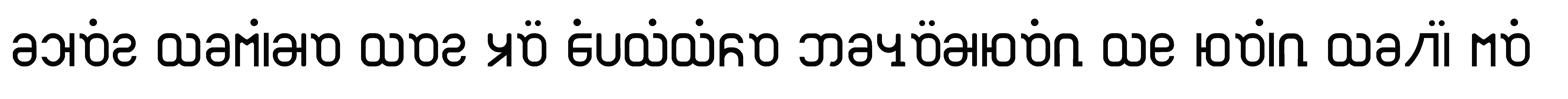
əsàʔ təmìsʰā taʔ ká buddha pʰəjásʰwàŋ tē waìŋ tətɕí mà
acak tamicha tat ka buddha phayachvan̊ te wain̊ ta kyi ma
Kadu people worship Buddha.

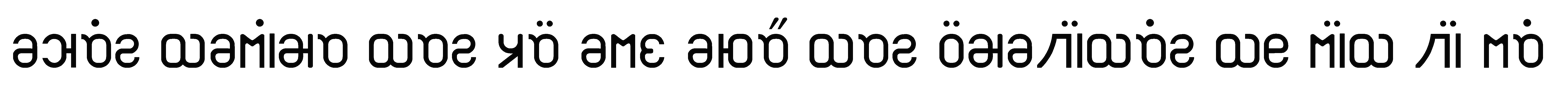
əsàʔ təmìsʰā tāʔ ká əmɛ̄awâ tāʔ ósʰətɕí tàʔ tē mít tɕí mà
acak tamicha tat ka amai ava tat o chakyi tat te mit kyi ma
Kadu people respect and love their parents, teachers.

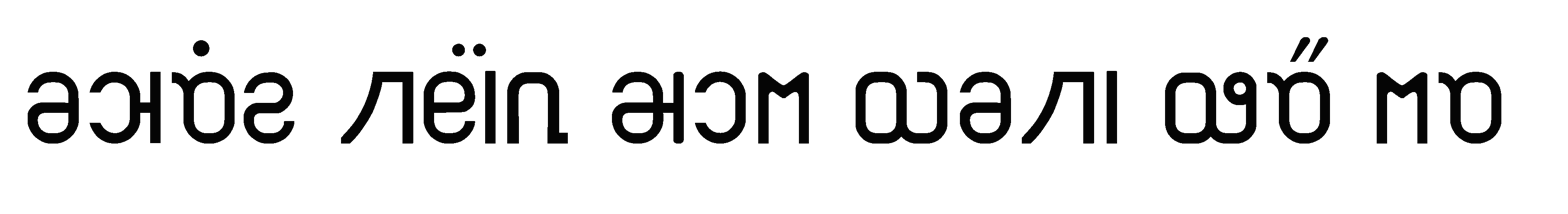
əsàʔ tɕeíŋ sʰɔ̄m tətɕī tʰá mā
acak kyein̊ chom takyi tha ma
Let's learn Kadu.

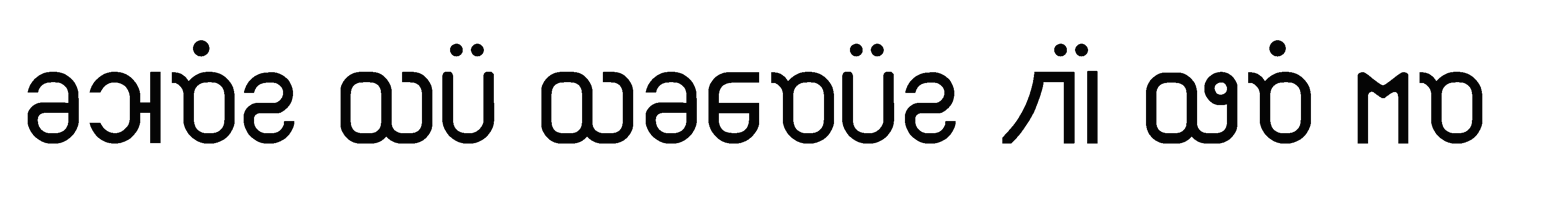
əsàʔ tú təpaúʔ tɕí tʰà mā
acak tu tapot kyi tha ma
Let's speak Kadu.

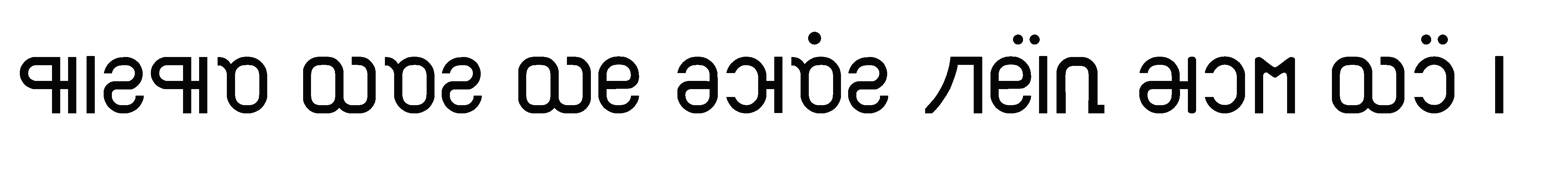
ɕīʔɕā tāʔ tē əsàʔ tɕeíŋ sʰɔ̄m tɔ́ ī
rhit rha tat te acak kyein̊ chom to i
Teach Kadu to children.

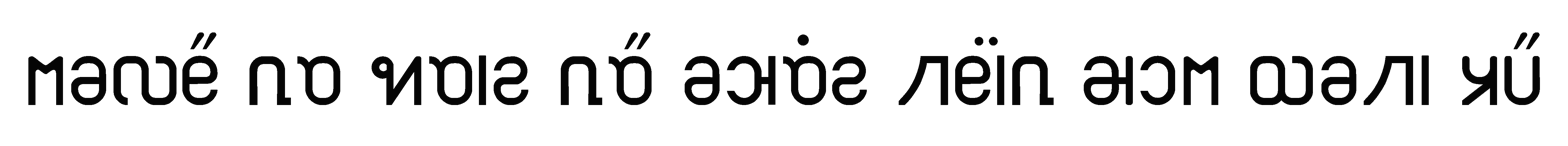
məlê ŋā naīʔ ŋâ əsàʔ tɕeíŋ sʰɔ̄m tətɕī kû
male n̊a nait n̊a acak kyein̊chom ta kyi ku
We will all learn Kadu.
