= Baishari Union =

Union of Bandarban District, Chittagong, Bangladesh

Baishari বাইশারী
- Union
- Interactive map of Baishari
- Country: Bangladesh
- Division: Chittagong Division
- District: Bandarban District
- Upazila: Naikhongchhari Upazila

Area
  - Total: 129.5 km^{2} (50.0 sq mi)

Population (2022)
  - Total: 18,336
  - Density: 141.6/km^{2} (366.7/sq mi)
- Time zone: UTC+6 (BST)
- Postal code: 4660
- Website: baishariup.bandarban.gov.bd

Baishari Union is a union of Naikhongchhari Upazila under Bandarban District.

== Demography ==
According to 2022 census, total population of the Union are 18,337. Among them, 14,931 are Muslim, 3,058 are Buddhist, 181 are Christian, 166 are Hindu and 1 are others.

Religion-2022
1. Islam (81.4%)
2. Buddhism (16.7%)
3. Christianity (0.99%)
4. Hinduism (0.90%)
5. Others (0.00%)

== Ethnicity ==
This Union is home to a variety of different ethnic groups. Among them, 15,553 are Bengali, 1,138 are Marma, 722 are Mru, 33 are Tripura and 910 are of others ethnic groups.

Ethnicity-2022
1. Bengali (84.7%)
2. Marma (6.21%)
3. Mru (3.94%)
4. Tripura (0.18%)
5. Chak and Others (4.96%)
