= Luish languages =

Group of Sino-Tibetan languages

Luish
- Asakian
- Geographic distribution: Burma and Bangladesh
- Linguistic classification: Sino-Tibetan: Tibeto-Burman; Sal; Jingpho–Luish; Luish
- Subdivisions: Sak; Kadu; Ganan; Chakpa †

Language codes
- Glottolog: sakk1239

The Luish, Asakian, or Sak languages are a group of Sino-Tibetan languages belonging to the Sal branch. They are spoken in Burma and Bangladesh, and consist of the Sak, Kadu, and Ganan languages. In recent years, Luish languages have been influenced by Burmese and Chakma.

Although Luish languages are now widely scattered and spoken by relatively small populations, Luce (1985) suggests that the Luish languages were “once spread over the whole north of Burma, from Manipur perhaps to northern Yunnan.”

Matisoff (2013) proposes the name Asakian, since Lui or Loi were used by the Meithei to refer to slaves. Although many speakers of Luish languages refer to themselves as Sak, Cak, or similar variations, speakers of Ganan and Mokhwang Kadu do not refer to themselves as Sak or Asak.

== Extinct languages ==
Matisoff (2013) has demonstrated that the extinct Andro, Sengmai, and Chairel languages of Manipur are also Luish languages.

Andro, Sengmai, and Chairel are extinct and known only from a glossary recorded in 1859, their speakers having switched to Meitei. There are also various unattested varieties of Lui or Loi ('serf') mentioned in nineteenth-century accounts that appear to be Luish varieties.

It is uncertain whether the extinct Pyu language of central Myanmar is a Luish language.

Benedict (1972) and Shafer (1974) had classified the extinct Taman language of northern Myanmar as part of the Luish branch, but it has since been shown by Keisuke Huziwara (2016) to be a non-Luish language, possibly a separate branch of Tibeto-Burman.

== Classification ==
Matisoff (2013), citing Huziwara (2012), provides the following Stammbaum classification for the Asakian (Luish) branch.

Asakian

- Cak
  - Cak
  - Sak
- Chairel
- Loi (Chakpa)
  - Sengmai
  - Andro
- Kadu
  - Ganan
  - Kadu

Huziwara (2020) merges Sengmai, Andro, and Chairel as varieties of Chakpa.

== Reconstruction ==
Proto-Luish has been reconstructed by Huziwara (2012), with additional Proto-Luish lexical reconstructions by Matisoff (2013). Like Proto-Austroasiatic and Jingpho, Proto-Luish has a sesquisyllabic syllable structure.

Proto-Luish reconstructions by Huziwara (2012), can be found at Wiktionary's list of Proto-Luish reconstructions.

== Bibliography ==
- George van Driem (2001). Languages of the Himalayas: An Ethnolinguistic Handbook of the Greater Himalayan Region. Brill.
