= Naikhongchhari Sadar Union =

Union of Bandarban District, Chittagong, Bangladesh

Naikkhyongchhari Sadar নাইক্ষ্যংছড়ি সদর
- Union
- Interactive map of Naikkhyongchhari Sadar
- Country: Bangladesh
- Division: Chittagong Division
- District: Bandarban District
- Upazila: Naikhongchhari Upazila

Area
  - Total: 76 km^{2} (29 sq mi)

Population (2022)
  - Total: 23,343
  - Density: 310/km^{2} (800/sq mi)
- Time zone: UTC+6 (BST)
- Postal code: 4660
- Website: naikhyongcharisadarup.bandarban.gov.bd

Naikhongchhari/Naikhyongchari Sadar Union is a union of Naikhongchhari Upazila under Bandarban District.

== Demography ==
According to 2022 census, total population of the Union are 23,343. Among them, 21,073 are Muslim, 2,039 are Buddhist, 211 are Hindu, 11 are Christian and 9 are others.

Religion-2022
1. Islam (90.3%)
2. Buddhism (8.73%)
3. Hinduism (0.90%)
4. Christianity (0.05%)
5. Others (0.04%)

== Ethnicity ==
This Union is home to a variety of different ethnic groups. Among them, 21,558 are Bengali, 591 are Marma and 1,194 are of others ethnic groups.

Ethnicity-2022
1. Bengali (92.3%)
2. Marma (2.53%)
3. Chak and Others (5.12%)
