= Ganan language =

Sino-Tibetan language spoken in Myanmar

Ganan
- Kanan
- Native to: Myanmar
- Region: Sagaing Region
- Native speakers: 9,000 (2007)
- Language family: Sino-Tibetan: Tibeto-Burman; Sal; Jingpho–Luish; Luish; Ganan

Language codes
- ISO 639-3: zkn
- Glottolog: gana1267
- ELP: Kanan
- Ganan is classified as Severely Endangered by the UNESCO Atlas of the World's Languages in Danger

Ganan (Burmese: ကနန်း; also spelled as Ganaan or Kanan) is a Sino-Tibetan language of northwestern Myanmar, spoken in Sagaing Region. It belongs to the Luish branch, and is most closely related to the Kadu language of Myanmar, with which it shares 84 to 89% lexical similarity. The Ganan dialects share 95 to 99% lexical similarity.

== Phonology ==
=== Vowels ===
	Front	Central	Back
Close	i		u
Close-mid	e		o
Open-mid	ɛ	ɜ	ɔ
Open		a	

=== Consonants ===
		Bilabial	Alveolar	Alveolo-palatal	Palatal	Velar	Glottal
Stop	Voiceless	p	t			k	ʔ
Stop	Voiced	b	d			ɡ	
Fricative	Voiceless		s	ɕ			h
Fricative	Voiced		z	ʑ			
Nasal		m	n		ɲ	ŋ	
Approximant			l		j	w	

== Names ==
Ethnologue lists Ganaan, Ganan, Ganon, Genan, Kanan as alternate names.

== Distribution ==
According to Ethnologue, as of 2007 Ganan is spoken in 24 villages of Banmauk Township along the Mu River by 9,000 people in Katha District, Sagaing Region, Myanmar. It is also located in a few villages in Homalin, Indaw, and Pinlebu townships.
