= Taman language (Myanmar) =

Extinct Sino-Tibetan language of Myanmar

Taman
- Native to: Myanmar
- Region: Htamanthi, Sagaing Region
- Ethnicity: Shan
- Extinct: 1931; 1 rememberer (2015)
- Language family: Sino-Tibetan: (unclassified); Taman

Language codes
- ISO 639-3: tcl
- Glottolog: tama1328
- Taman is classified as Extinct language by the UNESCO Atlas of the World's Languages in Danger.

Taman is an extinct Sino-Tibetan language that was spoken in Htamanthi village in Homalin Township, Sagaing Region, northern Myanmar. It was documented in a list of 75 words in Brown (1911). Keisuke Huziwara (2016) discovered an elderly rememberer of Taman in Htamanthi who could remember some Taman phrases as well as a short song, but was not fluent in the Taman language. However, no fluent speakers of Taman remained in the area.

== Language shift ==
Taman speakers have since shifted to Burmese and Tai Naing (Red Shan), a Tai language spoken in northern Myanmar. Matisoff (2013:25) surmises that pressure from the formerly widespread Kadu language had caused Taman to become marginalized. The descendants of Taman speakers have since been assimilated into Shan society.

== Classification ==
Benedict (1972) and Shafer (1974) classified Taman as part of the Luish branch of languages.

Words and affixes shared exclusively between Luish and Taman are (Huziwara 2016):

- negative prefix (Proto-Luish *a-, Taman ʔə-)
- 'put' (Proto-Luish *péy, Taman pe)
- 'go, walk' (Proto-Luish *ha, Taman hɔ)
- 'sun' as a compound word that includes 'eye'

However, Huziwara (2016) notes that despite Taman sharing some similarities with Luish, Taman cannot be securely classified within the Luish branch itself, and its place in Tibeto-Burman remains uncertain. Taman also shares various similarities with many nearby non-Luish languages, including various Sal languages. Huziwara (2016) concludes that Taman is part of a linkage of Tibeto-Burman languages spanning across northeast India and northern Myanmar (i.e., comparable to Scott DeLancey's Central Tibeto-Burman languages), but does not recognizably fit into any known Tibeto-Burman branch.

== Phonology ==
Taman has the following phonemes.

- Vowels: a, e, ɛ, i, ɨ, ɐ, o [ɔ, ɑ], u, ə
- Consonants: p, ph, t, th, c [ts, tʃ], k, m, n, ŋ, r, l, s (sʰ), ʃ, x, h, w (v), y

== Sound changes ==
Below are five innovations from Proto-Tibeto-Burman (PTB) to Taman identified by Huziwara (2016).

- raising of low vowels (PTB *-a > Taman -ɔ)
- fricativization of velar stops in word-initial positions (PTB *k- > Taman x-)
- loss of velar stops in word-final positions (PTB *-ak > Taman -a)
- addition of velar stops after high vowels (PTB *-i/-u > Taman -ek/-ouk)
- affrication of *gry- (PTB *gry- > Taman c-)

== Lexicon ==
Below is Brown's (1911) Taman word list as cited and re-transcribed in Huziwara (2016:19–29), and Brown's (1911) Taman list re-transcribed by Luce (1985), as cited and re-transcribed in Huziwara (2016).

The Taman word for 'river' is the same as the word for 'water'.

Gloss	Taman (Brown 1911)	Taman (Luce 1985)
one	tɔ	tə
two	nek	nek
three	sùm	sum
four	pəli	pəli
five	məŋɔ	məŋə
six	kwa	kwɑ
seven	sənè	səne
eight	pəsè	pəse
nine	təxɐ	tə̈xəː
ten	ʃi	ʃi
ape	jùn	–
arm, hand	la	la
arrow	pʰəlɔ	pʰəlɔ
axe	wɔtùm	wɔtum
bag	tʰùmbɔ	tʰumbə
bamboo	wɔ	wɔ
bat	sɔŋpʰula	sɔŋ-pulɑ
bear	sʰap	sʰap
bee	ùìŋ	uiŋ
big	lwaŋ	lwɑŋ
bird	kətʃeksɔ	kətʃeksɔ (sparrow)
bitter	xɔ	xɔ
blood	sʰe	sʰe
boat	li	li
body	tu	tu
bone	raŋ	raŋ
buffalo	mɔk	mɔk (cattle)
call	lu	–
cat	mətʃeksɔ	mətʃeksɔ
cold	xɑm	xɑːm
dog	vi	vi
ear	nəpʰɑ	nəpʰɑː
earth (soil)	pəkɔ	pəkɔ
eat	sɔ	–
elephant	məki	məki
eye	pekkwe	pəkkwe
father	vɔ ~ wɔ	vɔ ~ wɔ
female	nëm	nëm
fire	vè	ve
fish	ətsɔ	ətsɔ
flesh	hè	he
give	nëm	nëm
go	hɔ	hɔ
gold	xɑm	xɑːm
good	kəmë	kəmë
grass	sʰèìŋ	sʰeɪŋ
head	kəkɐ	kəkəː
hill	kɔùŋrwe	kɔʊŋrwe
hog	va ~ wa	va ~ wa (pig)
horse	tʃipòùk	tʃipɔʊk
house	ʃìp	ʃɪp
I	në	në
iron	ʃa	ʃa
kill	səsʰèùk	–
know	tʃùp	–
man (human being)	mek	mek
male	laktʃaŋ	lɑk tʃaŋ
moon	səlɔ	səlɔ
mother	nëm	nëm
name	təmeŋ	təmeŋ
night	nɑtaŋ	nɑːtaŋ
road	lam	lam
rock	taŋpɔ	taŋpɔ (stone)
salt	tsùm	tsum
snake	pɐ	pəː
silk	nè	–
speak	tʰè	–
star	taŋpɐ	taŋpəː
steal	xɐlɔ	xəːlɔ
sun	pupek	pupek
tooth	vɑkòùn ~ wɑkòùn	vɑkɔʊn ~ wɑkɔʊn
water	tʰi	tʰi
write	rek	–
year	kèìŋ	–

== Samples ==
On March 2, 2015, Keisuke Huziwara discovered an 83-year-old woman in Htamanthi who remembered some words and phrases of the Taman language, as well as a short song. The woman was born in a village just outside Htamanthi. The elicited words and phrases are (Huziwara 2016:14–16):

- hɔ əna, hɔ təyauŋ '(I) went over there.' (hɔ 'to go')
- kʰam sɔ-nə-kɔ 'Did (you) eat?' (kʰam 'food, cooked rice'; sɔ 'to eat')
- sɔ-kɛʔ 'already ate'
- ʔə-sɔ-wɛʔ 'did not eat (yet)' (ʔə- 'negative prefix')
- sɔ-nə-kɔ-ya 'ate; finished eating' (-nə 'desiderative suffix')
- tʰitum ŋɔ lɔ 'Where is the water?' (tʰi 'water'; tum 'container'; ŋɔ 'where'; lɔ 'interrogative')
- ʔəyɔ pe 'Where did I put it?' (pe 'to place'; ʔəyɔ 'where?')
- wa dɔ 'Come!' (wa 'to come')
- pi 'firewood' (cf. Meithei upi 'firewood')
- məla 'tea'
- məla sɔ nɔ 'Please drink tea.' (məla 'tea'; sɔ 'to eat')

=== Sample text ===
The song is transcribed as follows.

ʔi ʔələyaŋ ʔi ʔələyaŋ
nənum təhɔ ʔinahɔ
məceiʔ cɔ he lɔcɔ ci
məceiʔ cɔ ʔi na
nam ha mina
hɔ pi cɔ

Huziwara (2016:15–16) analyzes the song as follows.

- ʔi ʔələyaŋ ʔi ʔələyaŋ: exclamation introducing the song
- nənum təhɔ ʔina hɔ: 'The child went.'
- məceiʔcɔ he: 'Where is the child?' (Taman məceiʔcɔ 'child' < PTB *tsa-n)
- lɔcɔ ci: [meaning unclear]
- məceiʔcɔ, ʔina: 'I told the child'
- nam ha mina: 'Where did you go?'
- hɔ pi cɔ: 'I went outside.'

Altogether, the nouns, verbs, and prefixes elicited from Huziwara's (2016) Taman informant are:

- kʰam 'food, cooked rice'
- tʰi 'water'
- məla 'tea'
- pi 'firewood'
- tum 'container'
- məceiʔcɔ 'child'
- ʔə- 'negative prefix'
- sɔ 'to eat'
- hɔ 'to go'
- wa 'to come'
- pe 'to place, put'
