= Vyapari (caste) =

Regions with significant populations
- • India • Pakistan

Languages
- • Gujarati • Sindhi • Urdu

Religion
- • Islam 100%

Related ethnic groups
- • Doodwalas • Bania • Gujarati Shaikh • Memon

The Vyapari are a Muslim community found in the state of Gujarat in India. Many members of Vyapari Muslim community migrated to Pakistan after the independence in 1947 and settled in Karachi.

== See also ==
- Gujarati Muslims
