= Kadu people =

Ethnic group in Myanmar

ကဒူး/ကတူး

Total population
- 180,000 (est.)

Regions with significant populations
- Myanmar

Languages
- Kadu, Burmese

Religion
- Theravada Buddhism

Related ethnic groups
- Chak, Kanan

The Kadu people (Note: Burmese: ကဒူး/ကတူးလူမျိုး; also spelt Kado) or Asak people are an ethnic group in Myanmar. They speak the Kadu language. They mostly reside in the country's northwestern hills, centred around Katha, and are ethnolinguistically related to the Ganan and Sak peoples. The Kadu traditionally cultivate rice on irrigated terraces.

== Names ==
In Old Burmese, the Kadu were referred to as the Kantu or Sak-Kantu. Their endonym is Asak, commonly shortened to Sak. Speakers of the Ganan and Mokhwang Kadu dialects do not self-identify as Sak or Asak. In the 13th century History of Yuan, they are recorded as the Jiandu (建都), while the Travels of Marco Polo recorded them as the Caindu.

== History ==
The Kadu were the dominant ethnic group in the Chindwin River valley at the beginning of the early 2nd millennium A.D. until the Chin people and subsequently the Shan people migrated into the Chindwin Valley.

The Kadu likely descended from the Qiongdu (邛都), a sub-group of 'southwestern barbarians' described in Sima Qian's Records of the Grand Historian. They settled in present-day Myanmar during the Tang dynasty, becoming a dominant group in the Tagaung Kingdom. Scholars like Gordon Luce posit that the Pyu people were converted to Buddhism by the Sak-Kadu peoples.

With the rise of the Pagan kingdom, by the 12th and 13th centuries, the Kadu inhabited the border areas between the present-day Sichuan and Yunnan provinces of China and Burma. By the 13th century, they had largely assimilated into more dominant Tibeto-Burman speaking groups in both China and Burma. By the mid-13th century, the Kadu had diverged from the Sak (or Thet people), who now reside in southwestern Myanmar's Rakhine State. By the early 20th century, most Kadu had assimilated and adopted Burmese customs, including Theravada Buddhism.

== Population ==
The Kadu population is estimated to be approximately 180,000. The 1901 census counted 16,300 Kadu speakers, while the 1911 census reported 11,069 Kadu speakers. The 1931 census counted 36,400 persons of Kadu descent.

The Kadu primarily live in the country's northwest in Sagaing Region, scattered across 98 villages, including 38 villages in Banmauk Township, 34 villages in Indaw Township, 16 villages in Pinlebu Township, 5 villages in Katha Township, and 5 villages in Mogaung Township.
