= Sekmai dialect =

Sekmai dialect (or, Sengmai dialect) may refer to:

- Sekmai (Meitei dialect), a living dialect of Meitei language
- Sekmai (extinct dialect), a dialect once spoken in Sekmai region, which was replaced by Meitei language
