= Chakpa language =

Extinct Sino-Tibetan language of India

Chakpa
- Loi
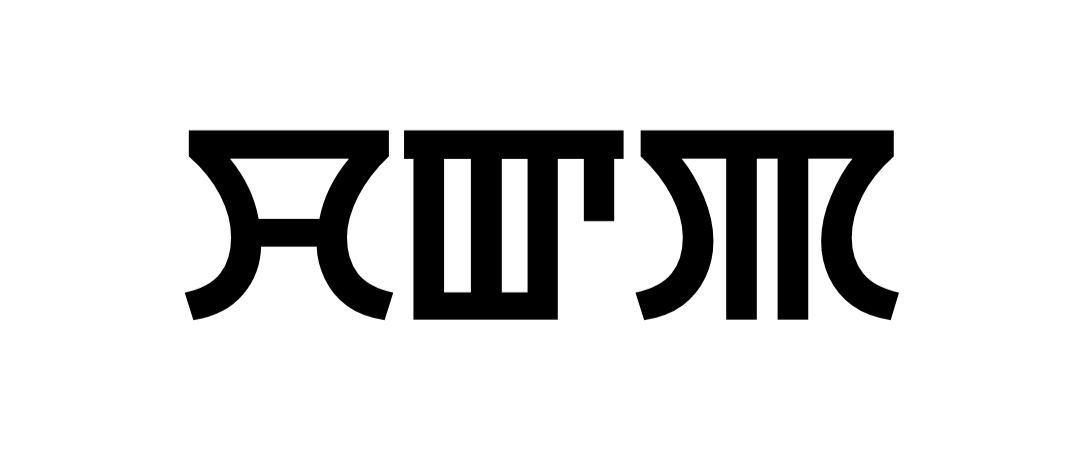
- Classical Meetei Mayek script transliteration of the Meitei language word "Chakpa"
- Native to: India
- Region: Manipur
- Ethnicity: assimilated into the Meitei ethnicity
- Extinct: after 1859
- Language family: Sino-Tibetan: Central Tibeto-Burman?; Sal; Jingpho–Luish; Luish; Chakpa
- Dialects: Andro; Sengmai (Sekmai); Phayeng; Khurkhul

Language codes
- ISO 639-3: None (mis)
- Glottolog: andr1245

Chakpa (Meitei) is an extinct Sino-Tibetan language that was spoken in the Imphal Valley of Manipur, India. It belonged to the Luish branch of the Sino-Tibetan family. Chakpa speakers have been shifted to that of Meitei language. Varieties of the language included Sengmai and Andro.

Chakpa was spoken in villages such as Andro, Sekmai (Sengmai), Phayeng, Khurkhul and Chairel, all of which are now Meitei-speaking villages.

== Other names ==
Loi (or Lui; hence "Luish") is a Meitei exonym that includes Chakpa. Although Chakpa are typically considered to be Loi, not all Loi are Chakpa. For example, Kakching and Kwatha are Loi villages that are not Chakpa.

== Documentation ==
Chakpa is preserved in written manuscripts that are recited by religious scholars during traditional ceremonies, such as those of the Lai Haraoba festival.

Chakpa word lists can be found in McCulloch (1859) and Basanta (1998).

The Chairel variety is documented in a word list by McCulloch (1859).
