= Naikhongchhari Upazila =

Naikhongchhari নাইক্ষ্যংছড়ি
- Upazila
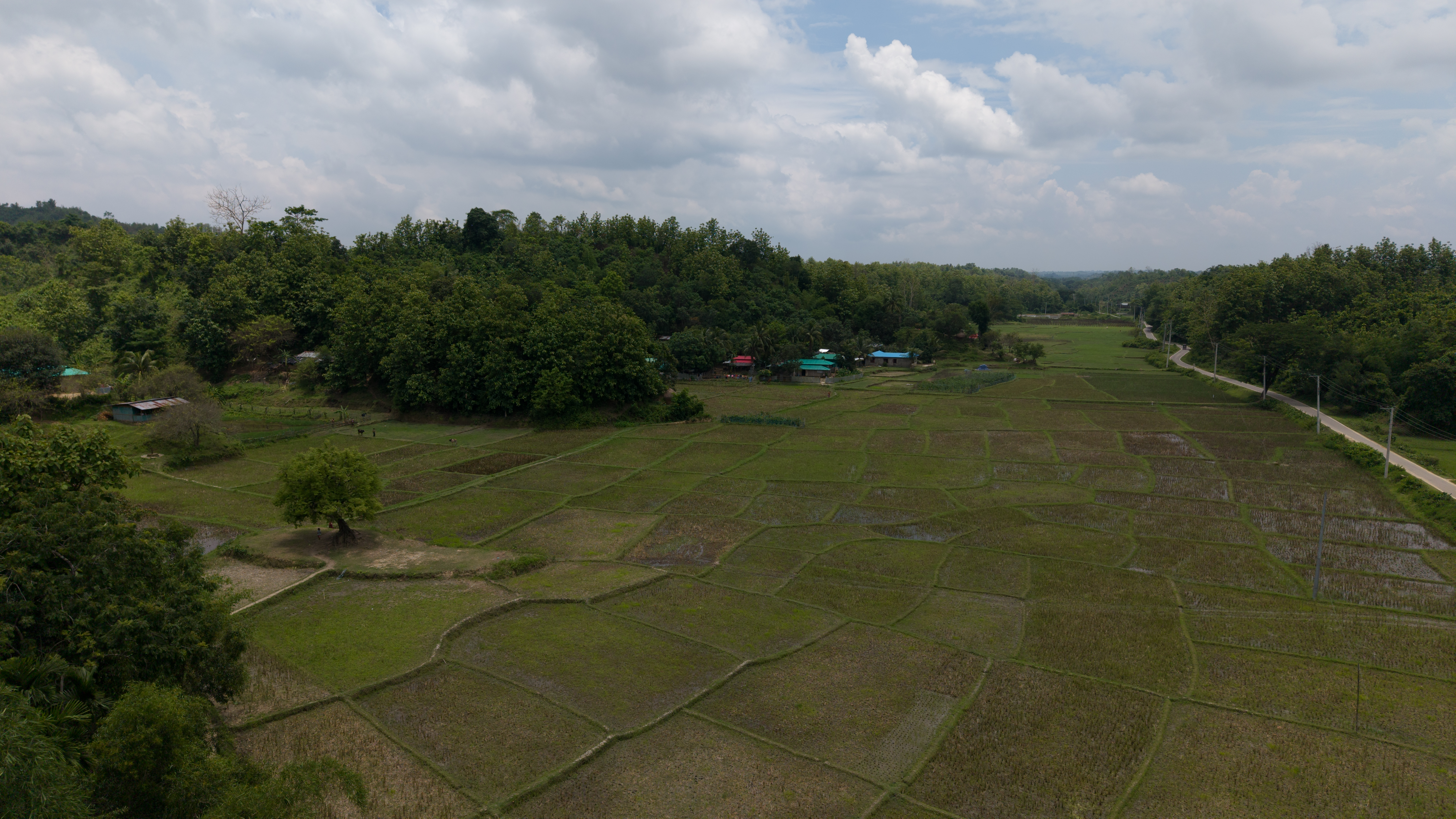
- Paddy fields in Naikhongchhari

- Coordinates: 21°25′N 92°11′E
- Country: Bangladesh
- Division: Chittagong
- District: Bandarban

Area
  - Total: 463.60 km^{2} (179.00 sq mi)

Population (2022)
  - Total: 76,477
  - Density: 164.96/km^{2} (427.25/sq mi)
- Time zone: UTC+6 (BST)
- Postal code: 4660

Naikhongchhari Upazila mauza geocode map

Naikhongchhari (Bengali: নাইক্ষ্যংছড়ি) is an upazila of Bandarban District in the Division of Chittagong, Bangladesh.

== Geography ==
Naikhongchhari is located at 21.4167°N 92.1833°E. It has a total area of 463.60 km^{2}. Naikhongchhari is bordered by Lama upazila to the north, Alikadam upazila to the east, Rakhine State of Myanmar to the south, and Cox's Bazar district to the west.

== Demographics ==
According to the 2022 Bangladeshi census, Naikkhongchhari Upazila had 16,181 households and a population of 76,477. 12.71% of the population were under 5 years of age. Naikkhongchhari had a literacy rate (age 7 and over) of 64.11%: 66.36% for males and 61.86% for females, and a sex ratio of 100.23 males for every 100 females. 41,344 (54.06%) lived in urban areas.

=== Ethnicity and religion ===
Religions in Naikhongchhari Upazila (2022)
Religion	Percent
Islam	79.38%
Buddhism	19.41%
Hinduism	0.70%
Christianity	0.49%
Other or not stated	0.02%

Population by religion in Union
Union	Muslim	Buddhist	Others
Baishari	14,931	3,058	347
Dochhari	7,419	2,065	163
Ghumdhum	13,530	4,017	160
Naikhongchhari	21,073	2,039	231
Sonaichhari	3,754	3,662	26

🟩 Muslim majority

As of the 2022 Bangladeshi census, Naikhongchhari upazila had a population of 76,477. The ethnic population was 12,636 (16.52%), of which Marma were 4,708,Tanchangya 2,881, Mru 2,356 and Chak 2,329.

Ethnicity in Naikhongchhari Upazila (2022)
1. Bengali (83.5%)
2. Marma (6.16%)
3. Tanchangya (3.77%)
4. Mro (3.08%)
5. Chak (3.05%)
6. Others (0.46%)

Population by ethnicity in Union
Union	Bengali	Marma	Mro	Others
Baishari	15,533	1,138	722	943
Dochhari	7,469	167	1,601	411
Ghumdhum	15,342	133	6	2,227
Naikhongchhari	21,558	591	6	1,188
Sonaichhari	3,939	2,679	21	803

🟩 Bengali majority

== Administration ==
Naikhongchhari Upazila is divided into five union parishads: Baishari, Dochhari, Ghumdhum, Sonaichhari and Naikhongchhari Sadar. The union parishads are subdivided into 17 mauzas and 237 villages.

== Nutrient Composition of Feed Stuffs ==
Nutrient Composition of Feed Stuffs

Division: Chottogram

Upazilla: Naikhangchori

Feeds/ fodder Name	DM (%)	Proximate Composition (%) on DM basis					Fiber (%) on DM basis		Energy (MJ/kg DM)		Mineral (%) on DM basis	
Feeds/ fodder Name	DM (%)	CP	CF	EE	Ash	NFE	ADF	NDF	GE	ME	Ca	P
1	2	3	4	5	6	7	8	9	10	11	12	13
Summer Season
Aahila pata	89.79	9.6	37.47	0.37	15.47	37.09	40.42	59.41	16.35	5.4	1.11	0.09
Veraker Grass	88.43	12.52	41.23	0.61	8.87	36.77	43.85	78.48	15.44	5.11	-	-
Rice Straw	92.92	5.59	38.55	0.78	15.89	39.19	41.32	71.12	15.5	5.12	0.22	0.069
Mustard oil cake	89.46	30.81	7.1	7.8	13.43	40.86	23.72	31.12	19.22	8.69	0.05	1.11
Maize broken	87.75	7.8	4.3	1.7	6.98	79.22	4.48	14.88	16.02	10.57	1.23	0.49
Wheat bran	88.81	15.79	11.7	3.5	7.56	61.45	3.72	45.2	18.66	12.32	0.18	0.88
Sugarcane Molasses	72.76	2.4	0.1	0.8	8.43	88.27	0.5	0.8	15.7	10.36	0.96	0.07
Rice polish	88.33	11.73	4.2	15.77	8.09	60.21	11.24	18.32	19.88	13.12	0.32	1.48
Rainy season
Rice Straw-1	90.11	5.95	45.0	0.78	18.33	29.94	42.46	62.54	15.5	5.12	0.034	0.04
Rice Straw-2	91.49	4.84	42.51	0.56	15.43	36.66	38.41	68.00	16.22	5.51	0.099	0.031
German grass	24.62	11.73	32.57	1.55	12.81	41.34	34.24	60.42	18.92	6.24	0.38	0.13
Para grass	90.58	8.87	36.57	2.14	10.97	40.85	42.22	76.81	17.49	6.1	0.06	0.05
Winter Season
Napier Grass	11.56	16.83	44.43	1.07	12.56	25.11	45.17	78.35	18.82	6.54	0.36	0.29
Para Grass	26.63	15.2	33.16	2.3	10.2	39.14	47.78	76.42	17.57	5.8	0.47	0.24
German Grass	26.36	12.05	43.94	1.83	8.98	33.2	42.14	70.5	18.98	6.26	0.35	0.27
Maize Fodder	22.05	8.85	28.26	1.8	15.53	45.56	33.88	65.52	18.5	6.11	0.63	0.15
Dal Grass	17.34	14.67	38.6	2.6	13.04	31.09	38.11	65	22.58	7.45	-	-
Fulker Grass	33.68	11.62	47.61	0.49	9.23	31.05	47.9	80.99	16.52	5.45	-	-
Dukker Grass	36.11	12.55	37	0.88	3.72	45.85	33.9	68.64	15.02	4.96	-	-
Koda Grass	38.91	10.05	46.03	0.53	8.42	34.97	47.23	80.13	16.36	5.4	-	-
Bhadli Grass	29.59	8.99	41.22	0.23	12.26	37.3	36.95	73.06	12.98	4.28	-	-
Banana Tree	5.8	2.38	38.2	5.8	4.86	39.76	37.34	56.74	13.74	4.53	0.81	0.26

== Incidents ==
On 24 May, 2026, three people were killed in a landmine explosion in Naikhongchhari. It is alleged that the landmine was planted by the Arakan Rohingya Salvation Army.

== See also ==
- Upazilas of Bangladesh
- Districts of Bangladesh
- Divisions of Bangladesh
