= Doodwala =

Muslim community of Gujarat, India

Regions with significant populations
- • India • Pakistan

Languages
- • Gujarati • Sindhi • Urdu

Religion
- Islam

The Doodwala are a Muslim community found in the state of Gujarat in India. Many members of the Doodwala community migrated to Pakistan after the partition of India in 1947 and settled in Karachi, where they are often known as Nagori.

== See also ==
- Gujarati Muslims
