= Sal languages =

Branch of Sino-Tibetan languages

Sal
- Brahmaputran; Bodo–Garo–Konyak–Jinghpaw; Baric
- Geographic distribution: India, Bangladesh, Burma
- Linguistic classification: Sino-Tibetan: Central Tibeto-Burman?; Sal
- Subdivisions: Boro–Garo; Konyak; Jingpho–Luish?; Chairel? †

Language codes
- Glottolog: brah1260

The Sal languages, also known as the Brahmaputran languages, are a branch of Sino-Tibetan languages spoken in northeast India, as well as parts of Bangladesh, Myanmar (Burma), and China.

== Alternative names ==
Ethnologue calls the group "Jingpho–Konyak-Garo–Bodo", while Scott DeLancey (2015) refers to it as "Bodo-Konyak-Garo-Jinghpaw" (BKJ). Glottolog lists this branch as “Brahmaputran (brah1260)”, as the languages are spoken around the Brahmaputra Valley.

== Classification within Sino-Tibetan ==
Scott DeLancey (2015) considers the Sal languages, which he refers to as Garo-Bodo-Konyak-Jinghpaw (BKJ), to be part of a wider Central Tibeto-Burman group.

== Internal classification ==
Benedict (1972:7) noted that the Bodo–Garo, Konyak, and Jingpho (Kachin) languages, as well as the extinct Chairel language, shared distinctive roots for "sun" and "fire".

Burling (1983) proposed a grouping of the Bodo–Garo, Konyak (Northern Naga), and Jingpho languages, characterized by several shared lexical innovations, including:

- *sal "sun"
- *war "fire"
- *s-raŋ "sky"
- *wa "father"
- *nu "mother"

Burling (1983) called the proposed group Sal, after the words sal, san and jan for "sun" in various of these languages. Coupe (2012:201–204) argues that some of Burling's proposed innovations are either not attested across the Sal languages, or have cognates in other Sino-Tibetan languages. Nevertheless, Matisoff (2013) accepts Burling's Sal group, and considers *s-raŋ 'sky/rain' and *nu 'mother' to be the most convincing Sal innovations.

The family is generally presented with three branches (Burling 2003:175, Thurgood 2003:11):

- The Bodo–Garo languages, including the Bodo and Koch languages, are spoken in the northeast Indian states of Assam, Meghalaya and Tripura.
- The Konyak languages are spoken by the Naga people in southeastern Arunachal Pradesh and northeastern Nagaland (both in northeastern India). This group is called Eastern Naga by Burling (1983) and Northern Naga by other authors. (The remaining languages of Nagaland belong to the separate Kuki-Chin-Naga group.)
- The Kachinic or Jingpho–Luish languages include Jingpho (Jinghpaw, Singhpo or Kachin), spoken in northern Burma and adjacent regions, and the Luish (or Sak) languages spoken in western Burma.

Shafer had grouped the first two as his Baric division, and Bradley (1997:20) also combines them as a subbranch.

Bradley (1997) tentatively considers Pyu and Kuki-Chin to be possibly related to Sal, but is uncertain about this.

Peterson (2009) considers Mru-Hkongso to be a separate Tibeto-Burman branch, but notes that Mru-Hkongso shares similarities with Bodo–Garo that could be due to the early split of Mruic from a Tibeto-Burman branch that included Bodo–Garo.

=== van Driem (2011) ===
The Brahmaputran branch of van Driem (2011) has three variants:

- Bodo–Garo and Konyak.
- Bodo–Garo, Konyak, and Dhimalish.
- Bodo–Garo, Konyak, Dhimalish, and Kachin–Luic.

The smallest is his most recent, and the one van Driem considers a well-established low-level group of Sino-Tibetan. However, Dhimalish is not accepted as a Sal language by Glottolog. Sotrug (2015) and Gerber, et al. (2016) consider Dhimalish to be particularly closely related to the Kiranti languages rather than to the Sal languages.

=== Matisoff (2012, 2013) ===
James Matisoff (2012) makes the following observations about the Sal grouping.

- Although Bodo–Garo and Northeastern Naga (Konyak) are indeed closely related, Jingpho and Northeastern Naga (Konyak) seem to be even more closely related to each other than Jingpho and Bodo-Garo are to each other.
- Luish is the Tibeto-Burman branch most closely related to Jingpho, for which further evidence is provided in Matisoff (2013).
- Similarities between Jingpho and Nungish are due to contact. Thus, Nungish is not particularly closely related to Jingpho, and is not a Sal language. On the other hand, Lolo-Burmese appears to be more closely related to Nungish than to Jingpho.

Matisoff (2012) notes that these Tibeto-Burman branches did not split off neatly in a tree-like fashion, but rather form a linkage. Nevertheless, Matisoff (2013:30) still provides the following Stammbaum for the Sal branch.

- Sal
  - Bodo–Garo
  - Jingpho-Konyak
    - Konyakian (Northern Naga)
    - Jingpho-Asakian
      - Jingphoic
      - Asakian

The unclassified extinct Taman language of northern Myanmar displays some similarities with Luish languages, Jingpho, and Bodo-Garo, but it is undetermined whether Taman is a Sal language or not.

== Bibliography ==
- Benedict, Paul K. (1972), Sino-Tibetan: A Conspectus (PDF), Cambridge: Cambridge University Press, ISBN 978-0-521-08175-7.
- Bradley, David (1997), "Tibeto-Burman languages and classification" (PDF), in Bradley, David (ed.), Tibeto-Burman languages of the Himalayas, Papers in South East Asian linguistics, vol. 14, Canberra: Pacific Linguistics, pp. 1–71, ISBN 978-0-85883-456-9.
- Burling, Robbins (1983), "The Sal Languages" (PDF), Linguistics of the Tibeto-Burman Area, 7 (2): 1–32.
- —— (2003), "The Tibeto-Burman languages of northeast India", in Thurgood, Graham; LaPolla, Randy J. (eds.), Sino-Tibetan Languages, London: Routledge, pp. 169–191, ISBN 978-0-7007-1129-1.
- Coupe, Alexander R. (2012), "Overcounting numeral systems and their relevance to sub-grouping in the Tibeto-Burman languages of Nagaland" (PDF), Language and Linguistics, 13 (1): 193–220.
- van Driem, George (2001), Languages of the Himalayas: An Ethnolinguistic Handbook of the Greater Himalayan Region, BRILL, ISBN 978-90-04-12062-4.
- —— (2014), "Trans-Himalayan" (PDF), in Owen-Smith, Thomas; Hill, Nathan W. (eds.), Trans-Himalayan Linguistics: Historical and Descriptive Linguistics of the Himalayan Area, Berlin: Mouton de Gruyter, pp. 11–40, ISBN 978-3-11-031083-2.
- Thurgood, Graham (2003), "A subgrouping of the Sino-Tibetan languages", in Thurgood, Graham; LaPolla, Randy J. (eds.), Sino-Tibetan Languages, London: Routledge, pp. 3–21, ISBN 978-0-7007-1129-1.
