= Chak people =

Community in Bangladesh and Burma

Chak
Sak
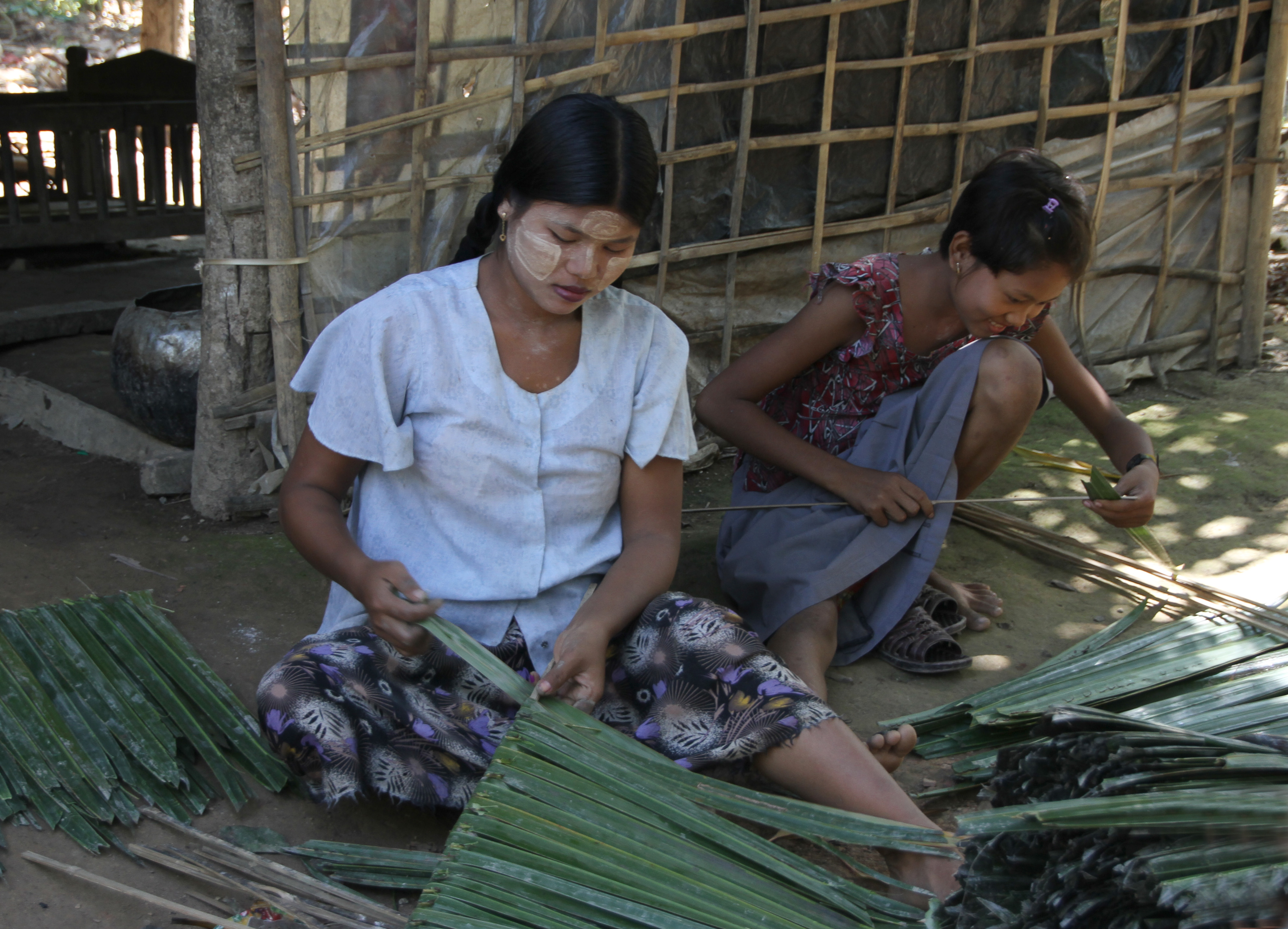
- Chak women (Thet) in Myanmar

Regions with significant populations
- Myanmar: 6,000
- Bangladesh: 4,000

Languages
- Sak language

Religion
- Theravada Buddhism

Related ethnic groups
- Kadu

The Chaks (Chak: চাক Chak pronunciation: [tʃak]) or (Chak: သက် Chak pronunciation: [θɛʔ]), are a community inhabiting the Chittagong Hill Tracts of Bangladesh, northeastern states of India. In Myanmar, they are known as Thet people classified under Rakhine subgroup. The Chak people are not officially recognized by the Myanmar government.

== History ==
By the mid-13th century, the Saks had diverged from the Kadu people, who now reside in northwestern Myanmar's Sagaing Region. The Chaks entered the Chittagong Hill Tracts in the 14th century after their kingdom was overrun by the Arakanese. Despite this, there are still Chaks living in Arakan.

== Thet people ==
The Chak people are called Thet (Burmese: သက်) in Myanmar. They are considered a subgroup of the Rakhine people under Myanmar's 1982 ethnicity law. According to Arakanese regional media organisations, that there were nearly 6,000 ethnic Thet in Myanmar with 3,000-4,000 in Rakhine State alone.
