= Mru script =

Writing system for the Mru language

Mru Mro, Krama
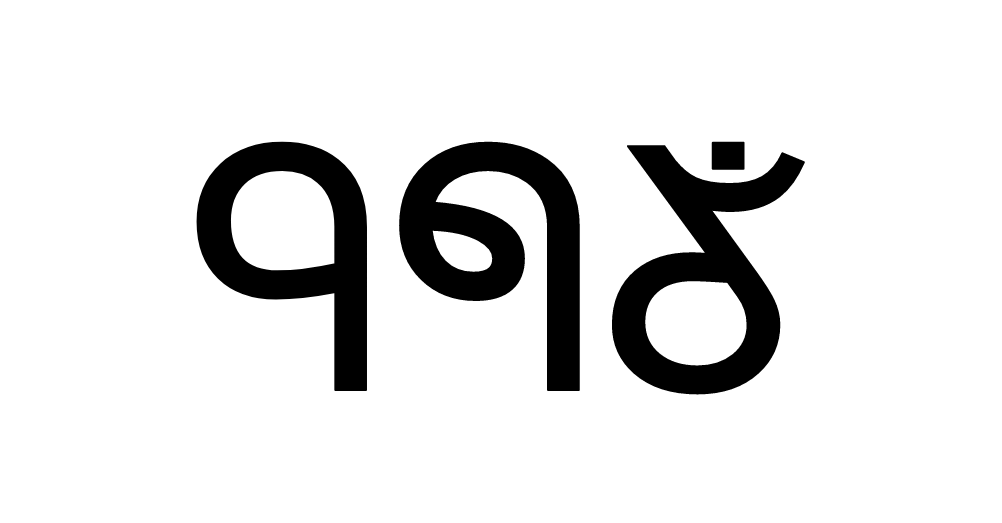
- The word "Mru" written in the Mru/Krama script
- Script type: Alphabet
- Creator: Menley Mro
- Direction: Left-to-right
- Languages: Mru

ISO 15924
- ISO 15924: Mroo (264), Mro, Mru

Unicode
- Unicode alias: Mro
- Unicode range: U+16A40–U+16A6F

The Mru script (Mru: 𖩃𖩓𖩑) is an indigenous, messianic script for the Mru language. In the 1980s Menlay Murang (also known as Manley Mro) created the religion of Khrama (or Crama) and with it a new script.

== History ==
The script was created in the 1980s by Menlay Murang (also known as Manley Mro). Traditional folklore has it that god Turai wrote down a script and a religion for the Mro people, as for all the other tribes, and gave it to a cow to deliver to them. However, the cow became tired and hungry during the long journey from heaven, and ate the book it was carrying, and the script was forever lost. Until the 1980s it was a great source of shame to the Mro people that they did not have a script of their own, and Menlay Murang is held in high esteem for redeeming them from this. Some textbooks claim that Menlay Murang based the script on Roman, Burmese and Chinese characters, although others state that any similarity to other scripts is purely coincidental. Sources agree, however, that the script bears no natural genetic relationship with any existing script.

== Structure ==
The Mro script is an alphabet, therefore each character represents one sound, and some sounds are represented by more than one letter. It is written from left to right with spaces between words. No tone marks or combining characters are used.

Two script-specific punctuation characters are known, 𖩮 'DANDA' and 𖩯 'DOUBLE DANDA'.

Two of the Mro letters are used as abbreviations. The letter 𖩞 'TEK' /tɛk/ can be used instead of the word, 𖩀𖩘𖩌 tek ‘quote’. The letter 𖩜 'HAI' /hai/ can be used for groups of letters like 𖩉𖩆𖩊 hai

== Characters ==
The Mru script has 31 letters, 23 consonants and 8 vowels. Each letter represents a singular phoneme. Though some phonemes are represented by multiple characters.

Mru letters
ko 𖩙 IPA: /k/	kä 𖩌 IPA: /k/	khäy 𖩈 IPA: /kʰ/	ngi 𖩁 IPA: /ŋ/	cu 𖩋 IPA: /c~ts~tsʰ/
ta 𖩀 IPA: /t/	tek 𖩞 IPA: /t/	thea 𖩕 IPA: /tʰ/	da 𖩅 IPA: /d/	nin 𖩏 IPA: /n/
pa 𖩐 IPA: /p/	phi 𖩇 IPA: /pʰ/	ba 𖩄 IPA: /b/	mim 𖩃 IPA: /m/	mäm 𖩎 IPA: /m/
yo 𖩂 IPA: /ʝ~j/	ro 𖩓 IPA: /r/	ol 𖩍 IPA: /l/	lan 𖩚 IPA: /l/	la 𖩛 IPA: /l/
si 𖩔 IPA: /ʃ/	hau 𖩉 IPA: /h/	hai 𖩜 IPA: /h/	ʼo 𖩒 IPA: /ʔ/	a 𖩆 IPA: /a~ɑ/
dai 𖩊 IPA: /i/	u 𖩑 IPA: /u/	ea 𖩖 IPA: /ɛ~ə/	e 𖩘 IPA: /e/	wa 𖩗 IPA: /ɯ/
ri 𖩝 IPA: /ɔ/

== Numerals ==
Like the latin script, the Mru Script has 10 distinct numerals.

Mru numerals
0 𖩠	1 𖩡	2 𖩢	3 𖩣	4 𖩤	5 𖩥	6 𖩦	7 𖩧	8 𖩨	9 𖩩

== Unicode ==
The Mru alphabet was added to the Unicode Standard in June, 2014 with the release of version 7.0.

The Unicode block for the Mru script, called Mro, is U+16A40–U+16A6F:

Mro^{[1]}^{[2]} Official Unicode Consortium code chart (PDF)
	0	1	2	3	4	5	6	7	8	9	A	B	C	D	E	F
U+16A4x	𖩀	𖩁	𖩂	𖩃	𖩄	𖩅	𖩆	𖩇	𖩈	𖩉	𖩊	𖩋	𖩌	𖩍	𖩎	𖩏
U+16A5x	𖩐	𖩑	𖩒	𖩓	𖩔	𖩕	𖩖	𖩗	𖩘	𖩙	𖩚	𖩛	𖩜	𖩝	𖩞	
U+16A6x	𖩠	𖩡	𖩢	𖩣	𖩤	𖩥	𖩦	𖩧	𖩨	𖩩					𖩮	𖩯
Notes 1.As of Unicode version 18.0 2.Grey areas indicate non-assigned code points
