= Rupshipara Union =

Union of Bandarban District, Chittagong, Bangladesh

Rupshipara রূপসীপাড়া
- Union
- Interactive map of Rupshipara
- Country: Bangladesh
- Division: Chittagong Division
- District: Bandarban District
- Upazila: Lama Upazila

Area
  - Total: 90.65 km^{2} (35.00 sq mi)

Population (2022)
  - Total: 14,516
  - Density: 160.1/km^{2} (414.7/sq mi)
- Time zone: UTC+6 (BST)
- Postal code: 4640
- Website: rupushiparaup.bandarban.gov.bd

Rupshipara/Rupushipara/Rupasipara Union is a union of Lama Upazila under Bandarban District.

== Demography ==
According to 2022 census, total population of the Union are 14,516. Among them, 8,285 are Muslim, 4,968 are Buddhist, 439 are Christian, 18 are Hindu and 806 are others.

Religion-2022
1. Islam (57.1%)
2. Buddhism (34.2%)
3. Christianity (3.02%)
4. Hinduism (0.12%)
5. Others (5.55%)

== Ethnicity ==
This Union is home to a variety of different ethnic groups. Among them, 9,188 are Bengali, 2,551 are Marma, 2,492 are Mru, 270 are Tripura and 15 are of others ethnic groups.

Ethnicity-2022
1. Bengali (63.3%)
2. Marma (17.6%)
3. Mru (17.2%)
4. Tripura (1.86%)
5. Others (0.10%)
