= Lama, Bandarban =

Lama লামা
- Municipality
- Interactive map of Lama
- Coordinates: 21°46′39″N 92°11′42″E
- Country: Bangladesh
- Division: Chittagong Division
- District: Bandarban District
- Upazila: Lama Upazila

Government
  - Mayor: vacant

Area
  - Total: 13.87 km^{2} (5.36 sq mi)

Population (2022)
  - Total: 22,653
  - Density: 1,633/km^{2} (4,230/sq mi)
- Time zone: UTC+6 (BST)
- Postal code: 4640
- Website: ps.lama.bandarban.gov.bd/en

Lama is a town of Bandarban District in Chittagong Hill Tracts, Bangladesh.

== Demography ==
According to 2022 census, total population of the town are 22,653. Among them, 17,739 are Muslim, 3,078 are Buddhist, 1,615 are Hindu, 202 are Christian and 619 are others.

Religion in Lama town-2022
1. Islam (78.3%)
2. Buddhism (13.6%)
3. Hinduism (7.13%)
4. Christianity (0.89%)
5. Others (0.08%)

== Ethnic Group ==
Lama is home to various ethnic minorities. There are 19,715 Bengalis, 2,638 Marma, 151 Mro, 74 Tripura and 75 others people.

Ethnicity in Lama town (2022)
1. Bengali (87.0%)
2. Marma (11.6%)
3. Mro (0.67%)
4. Tripura (0.33%)
5. Others (0.33%)
