= Sarai Union =

Union of Bandarban District, Chittagong, Bangladesh

Sarai সরই
- Union
- Interactive map of Sarai
- Country: Bangladesh
- Division: Chittagong Division
- District: Bandarban District
- Upazila: Lama Upazila

Area
  - Total: 93.24 km^{2} (36.00 sq mi)

Population (2022)
  - Total: 14,865
  - Density: 159.4/km^{2} (412.9/sq mi)
- Time zone: UTC+6 (BST)
- Postal code: 4640
- Website: aziznagarup.bandarban.gov.bd

Sarai Union is a union of Lama Upazila under Bandarban District.

== Demography ==
According to 2022 census, total population of the Union are 14,863. Among them, 10,148 are Muslim, 1,905 are Christian, 1,699 are Buddhist, 379 are Hindu and 732 are others.

Religion-2022
1. Islam (68.3%)
2. Christianity (12.8%)
3. Buddhism (11.4%)
4. Hinduism (2.55%)
5. Others (4.92%)

== Ethnicity ==
This Union is home to a variety of different ethnic groups. Among them, 10,667 are Bengali, 2,138 are Mru, 1,028 are Tripura, 469 are Marma and 561 are of others ethnic groups.

Ethnicity-2022
1. Bengali (71.8%)
2. Mru (14.4%)
3. Tripura (6.92%)
4. Marma (3.16%)
5. Others (3.77%)
