= Mru language =

Sino-Tibetan language primarily spoken in Bangladesh

Mru
- 𖩃𖩓𖩑
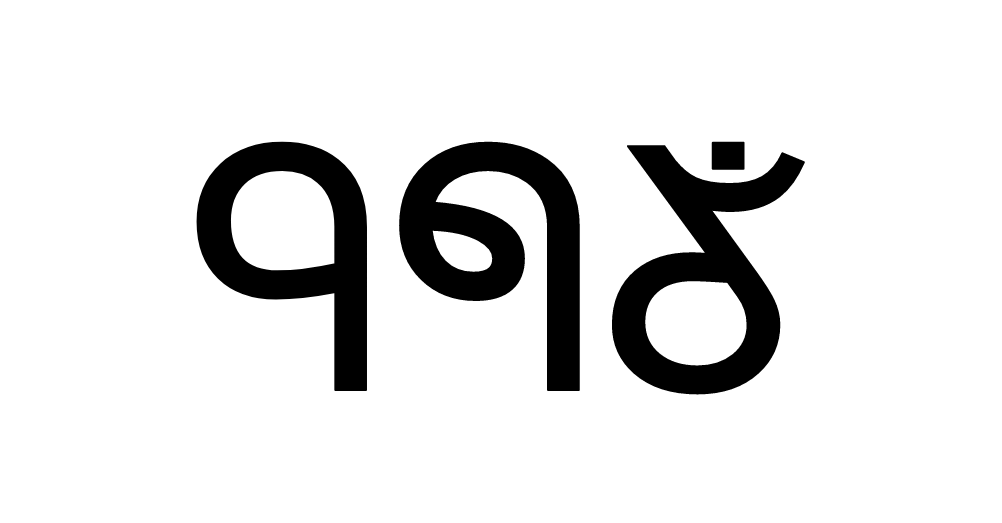
- 'Mru' in the Mru script
- Native to: Bangladesh, Myanmar
- Ethnicity: Mru
- Native speakers: (50,000 cited 1999–2007)
- Language family: Sino-Tibetan: Tibeto-Burman; Mruic; Mru
- Writing system: Mru script, Latin script

Language codes
- ISO 639-3: mro
- Glottolog: mruu1242
- ELP: Mru
- Mru is classified as Severely Endangered by the UNESCO Atlas of the World's Languages in Danger

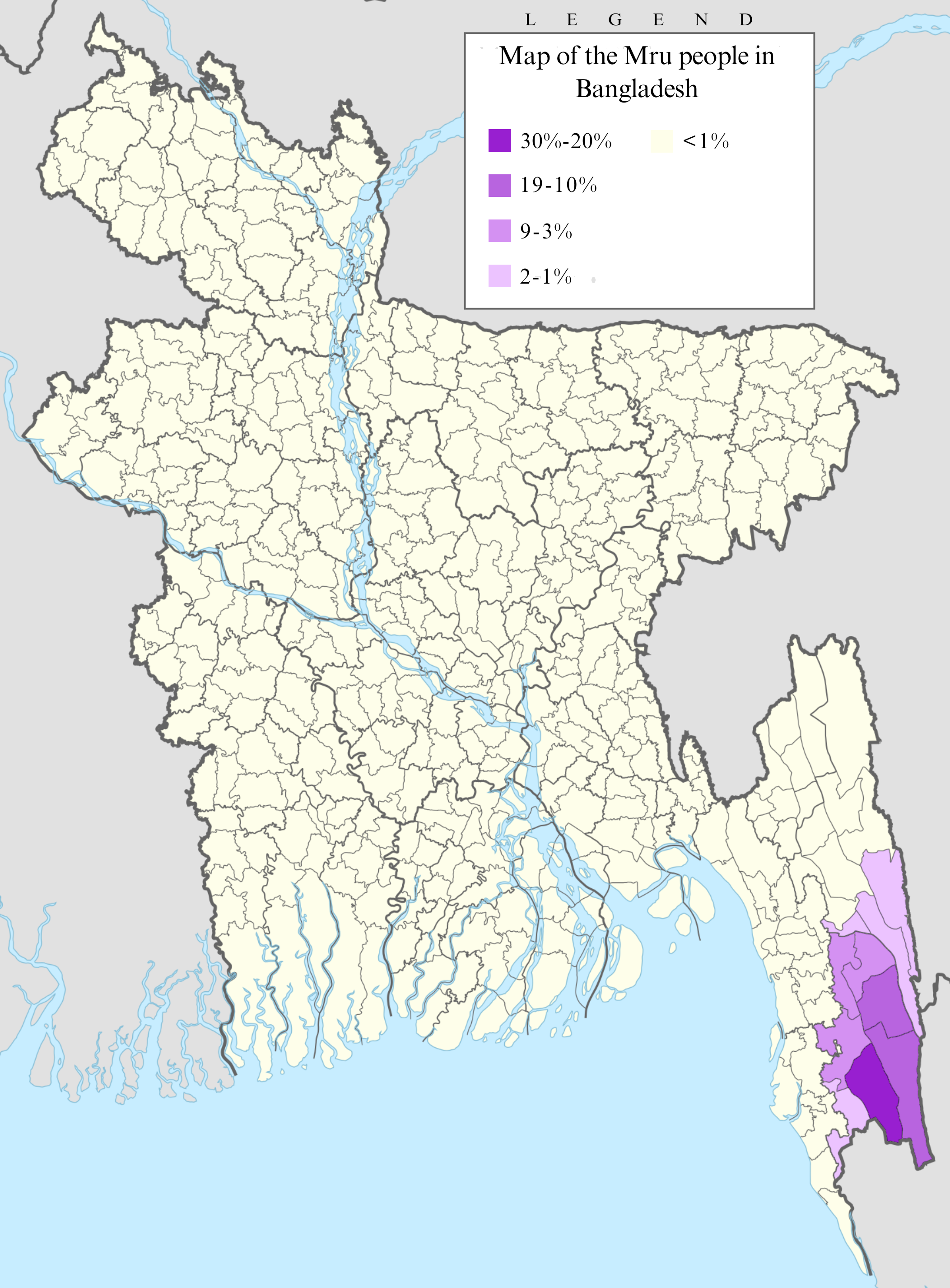
Map showing the expanse of the Mru people in Bangladesh

Mro, also known as Mru (Murung), is a Sino-Tibetan language of Bangladesh and Myanmar. It is spoken by a community of Mrus (Mros) inhabiting the Chittagong Hill Tracts of Bangladesh with a population of 22,000 according to the 1991 census, and in Rakhine State, Myanmar. The Mrus are the second-largest tribal group in Bandarban District of the Chittagong Hill Tracts. A small group of Mros also live in Rangamati Hill District.

== Classification ==
Mru forms the Mruic language branch with Hkongso and Anu, which are spoken in Paletwa Township, Chin State, Myanmar. The position of Mruic with Sino-Tibetan is unclear.

== Distribution ==
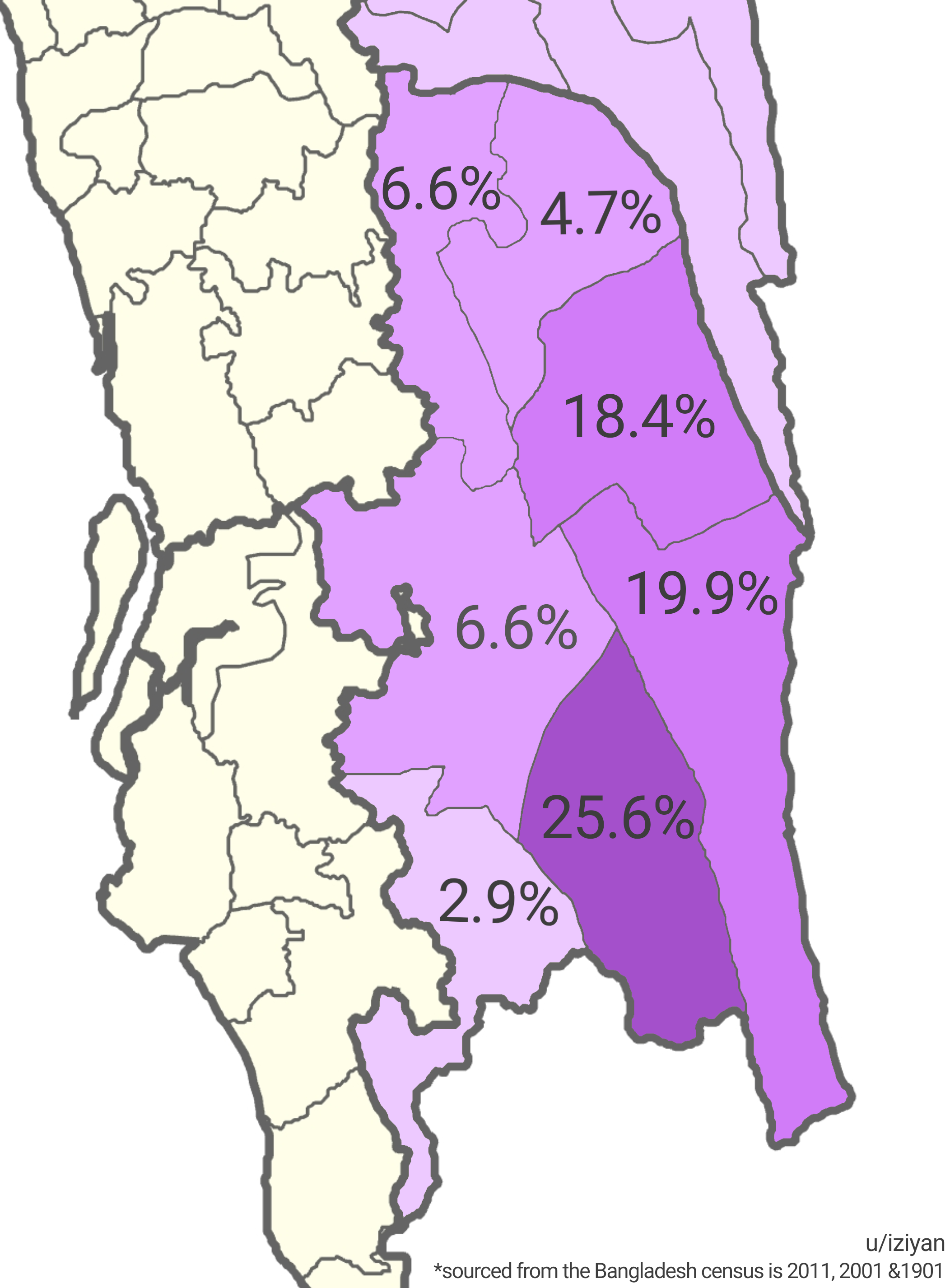
Percentage Map of Mru people by Upazila in Bandarban District

The Mros live in forest areas of Lama Upazila, Ruma Upazila, Alikadam Upazila, and Thanchi Upazila near Chimbuk Mountain of Bandarban District, Bangladesh (Rashel 2009). In Myanmar, they also live in Buthidaung Township and Ponnagyun Township in Sittwe District (Akiab), Rakhine State.

== Subdivisions ==
Ethnologue (22nd edition) lists 3 main dialects as Anok, Dowpreng (Dopreng), and Sungma (Tshungma), as well as the 2 minor dialects of Domrong and Rumma.

- Anok: largest and central
- Tshungma: in the north
- Domrong: in the lowlands north of the Matamuri
- Dopreng: in far south and into Arakan
- Rumma: in far south and into Arakan

There are five Mru dialects according to Ebersole (1996).

- Anawk
- Süngma
- Dopreng
- Tamsa
- Rengmitsa

There are five major Mro clans (Rashel 2009).

- Dengua
- Premsang
- Kongloi
- Maizer
- Ganaroo Gnar

Rashel (2009) also lists another classification scheme which lists ten Mro clans.

- Yarua (subdivisions below)
  - Khatpo
  - Chimlung
  - Zongnow
- Sangkan
- Chawla
- Ngaringcha
- Tang
- Deng
- Kough
- Tam-tu-chah
- Kanbak
- Prenju
- Naichah
- Yomore
- Rum/Rumthu
- Saisanow
- Simlung

== Grammar ==
Unlike the Kuki-Chin languages, Mru has SVO (subject-verb-object) word order (Ebersole 1996).

== Phonology ==
=== Consonants ===
		Labial	Alveolar	Palatal	Velar	Glottal
Nasal		m	n		ŋ	
Plosive/ Affricate	voiceless	p	t	tɕ	k	ʔ
Plosive/ Affricate	aspirated	pʰ	tʰ	tɕʰ	kʰ	
Plosive/ Affricate	voiced	b	d			
Fricative			s	(ʃ)		h
Rhotic			r			
Approximant		w	l	j		

/s/ can also be heard as [ʃ].

=== Vowels ===
	Front	Central	Back	
Close	i		ɯ	u
Mid	ɛ		ɤ	ɔ
Open		a		

== Numerals ==
Rashel (2009:159) lists the following Mro numerals.

1. lok လော့
2. pre ပရေ
3. sum သုံ
4. tle တ္လေ
5. tnga တ္င
6. trok တရော့
7. rinit ခိနစ်
8. riyat ခိယတ်
9. tako တ္ကို
10. homod ဟောမော့

== Script ==
Mru Mro, Krama
- Script type: alphabet
- Period: 1980s — present
- Languages: Mru

ISO 15924
- ISO 15924: Mroo (264), Mro, Mru

Unicode
- Unicode alias: Mro
- Unicode range: U+16A40–U+16A6F

The Mru script is an indigenous, messianic script: In the 1980s Menlay Murang (also known as Manley Mro) created the religion of Khrama (or Crama) and with it a new script for the Mru language.

The script is written from left to right and has its own set of digits. It does not use tone marks.

The Mru language is written in both the Latin and Mru scripts.

=== Unicode ===
The Mru alphabet was added to the Unicode Standard in June, 2014 with the release of version 7.0.

The Unicode block for the Mru script, called Mro, is U+16A40–U+16A6F:

Mro^{[1]}^{[2]} Official Unicode Consortium code chart (PDF)
	0	1	2	3	4	5	6	7	8	9	A	B	C	D	E	F
U+16A4x	𖩀	𖩁	𖩂	𖩃	𖩄	𖩅	𖩆	𖩇	𖩈	𖩉	𖩊	𖩋	𖩌	𖩍	𖩎	𖩏
U+16A5x	𖩐	𖩑	𖩒	𖩓	𖩔	𖩕	𖩖	𖩗	𖩘	𖩙	𖩚	𖩛	𖩜	𖩝	𖩞	
U+16A6x	𖩠	𖩡	𖩢	𖩣	𖩤	𖩥	𖩦	𖩧	𖩨	𖩩					𖩮	𖩯
Notes 1.As of Unicode version 18.0 2.Grey areas indicate non-assigned code points

== See also ==
- Mru word list (Wiktionary)
