= Gajalia Union =

Union of Bandarban District, Chittagong, Bangladesh

Gajalia গজালিয়া
- Union
- Interactive map of Gajalia
- Country: Bangladesh
- Division: Chittagong Division
- District: Bandarban District
- Upazila: Lama Upazila

Area
  - Total: 124.32 km^{2} (48.00 sq mi)

Population (2022)
  - Total: 13,880
  - Density: 111.6/km^{2} (289.2/sq mi)
- Time zone: UTC+6 (BST)
- Postal code: 4640
- Website: gajaliaup.bandarban.gov.bd

Gajalia Union is a union of Lama Upazila under Bandarban District.

== Demography ==
According to 2022 census, total population of the Union are 13,878. Among them, 4,321 are Muslim, 6,155 are Buddhist, 2,720 are Christian, 78 are Hindu and 604 are others.

Religion-2022
1. Buddhism (44.4%)
2. Islam (31.1%)
3. Christianity (19.6%)
4. Hinduism (0.56%)
5. Others (4.35%)

== Ethnicity ==
This Union is home to a variety of different ethnic groups. Among them, 4,497 are Bengali, 4,453 are Marma, 2,885 are Mru, 1,887 are Tripura and 156 are of others ethnic groups.

Ethnicity-2022
1. Bengali (32.4%)
2. Marma (32.1%)
3. Mru (20.8%)
4. Tripura (13.6%)
5. Others (1.12%)
