= Lama Union =

Union of Bandarban District, Chittagong, Bangladesh

Lama Sadar লামা সদর
- Union
- Interactive map of Lama Sadar
- Country: Bangladesh
- Division: Chittagong Division
- District: Bandarban District
- Upazila: Lama Upazila

Area
  - Total: 75.11 km^{2} (29.00 sq mi)

Population (2022)
  - Total: 10,119
  - Density: 134.7/km^{2} (348.9/sq mi)
- Time zone: UTC+6 (BST)
- Postal code: 4640
- Website: lamasadarup.bandarban.gov.bd

Lama Sadar Union is a union of Lama Upazila under Bandarban District.

== Demography ==
According to 2022 census, total population of the Union are 10,119. Among them, 6,115 are Muslim, 2,213 are Buddhist, 735 are Christian, 994 are Hindu and 62 are others.

Religion-2022
1. Islam (60.4%)
2. Buddhism (21.9%)
3. Christianity (9.82%)
4. Hinduism (7.26%)
5. Others (0.62%)

== Ethnicity ==
This Union is home to a variety of different ethnic groups. Among them, 7,084 are Bengali, 1,685 are Mru, 739 are Tripura, 605 are Marma and 6 are of others ethnic groups.

Ethnicity-2022
1. Bengali (70.0%)
2. Mru (16.6%)
3. Tripura (7.30%)
4. Marma (5.98%)
5. Chak and Others (0.06%)
