= Faitang Union =

Union of Bandarban District, Chittagong, Bangladesh

Faitang ফাইতং
- Union
- Interactive map of Faitang
- Country: Bangladesh
- Division: Chittagong Division
- District: Bandarban District
- Upazila: Lama Upazila

Area
  - Total: 64.75 km^{2} (25.00 sq mi)

Population (2022)
  - Total: 14,735
  - Density: 227.6/km^{2} (589.4/sq mi)
- Time zone: UTC+6 (BST)
- Postal code: 4640
- Website: fythongup.bandarban.gov.bd

Faitang Union is a union of Lama Upazila under Bandarban District.

== Demography ==
According to 2022 census, total population of the Union are 14,734. Among them, 11,820 are Muslim, 2,349 are Buddhist, 334 are Christian, 215 are Hindu and 16 are others.

Religion-2022
1. Islam (80.2%)
2. Buddhism (15.9%)
3. Christianity (2.27%)
4. Hinduism (1.46%)
5. Others (0.12%)

== Ethnicity ==
This Union is home to a variety of different ethnic groups. Among them, 12,124 are Bengali, 2,216 are Marma, 323 are Tripura, 56 are Mru and 15 are of others ethnic groups.

Ethnicity-2022
1. Bengali (82.3%)
2. Marma (15.0%)
3. Tripura (2.19%)
4. Mru (0.38%)
5. Others (0.10%)
