= Fansiakhali Union =

Union of Bandarban District, Chittagong, Bangladesh

Fansiakhali ফাঁসিয়াখালী
- Union
- Interactive map of Fansiakhali
- Country: Bangladesh
- Division: Chittagong Division
- District: Bandarban District
- Upazila: Lama Upazila

Area
  - Total: 191.66 km^{2} (74.00 sq mi)

Population (2022)
  - Total: 36,210
  - Density: 188.9/km^{2} (489.3/sq mi)
- Time zone: UTC+6 (BST)
- Postal code: 4640
- Website: fasiakhaliup.bandarban.gov.bd

Fansiakhali Union is a union of Lama Upazila under Bandarban District.

== Demography ==
According to 2022 census, total population of the Union are 36,209. Among them, 2,746 are Muslim, 2,746 are Buddhist, 1,750 are Christian, 815 are Hindu and 681 are others.

Religion-2022
1. Islam (83.5%)
2. Buddhism (7.58%)
3. Christianity (4.83%)
4. Hinduism (2.25%)
5. Others (1.88%)

== Ethnicity ==
This Union is home to a variety of different ethnic groups. Among them, 31,512 are Bengali, 2,395 are Marma, 1,201 are Mru, 1,079 are Tripura and 22 are of others ethnic groups.

Ethnicity-2022
1. Bengali (87.0%)
2. Marma (6.61%)
3. Mru (3.32%)
4. Tripura (2.98%)
5. Others (0.06%)
