= Aziznagar Union =

Union of Bandarban District, Chittagong, Bangladesh

Aziznagar আজিজনগর
- Union
- Interactive map of Aziznagar
- Country: Bangladesh
- Division: Chittagong Division
- District: Bandarban District
- Upazila: Lama Upazila

Area
  - Total: 95.83 km^{2} (37.00 sq mi)

Population (2022)
  - Total: 12,709
  - Density: 132.6/km^{2} (343.5/sq mi)
- Time zone: UTC+6 (BST)
- Postal code: 4641
- Website: aziznagarup.bandarban.gov.bd

Aziznagar Union is a union of Lama Upazila under Bandarban District.

== Demography ==
According to 2022 census, total population of the Union are 12,709. Among them, 11,438 are Muslim, 665 are Buddhist, 371 are Christian, 223 are Hindu and 12 are others.

Religion-2022
1. Islam (90.0%)
2. Buddhism (5.23%)
3. Christianity (2.92%)
4. Hinduism (1.76%)
5. Others (0.09%)

== Ethnicity ==
This Union is home to a variety of different ethnic groups. Among them, 11,683 are Bengali, 492 are Marma, 345 are Tripura, 173 are Mru and 16 are of others ethnic groups.

Ethnicity-2022
1. Bengali (91.9%)
2. Marma (3.87%)
3. Tripura (2.71%)
4. Mru (1.36%)
5. Others (0.13%)
