= Anu-Hkongso language =

Sino-Tibetan language spoken in Myanmar

Anu-Hkongso
- Anu
- Native to: Myanmar
- Region: Paletwa Township
- Ethnicity: Hkongso, Anu
- Native speakers: 4,000 (2008)
- Language family: Sino-Tibetan: Mruic; Anu-Hkongso
- Dialects: Anu; Hkongso

Language codes
- ISO 639-3: anl
- Glottolog: anuu1241

Anu-Hkongso (also spelled Anu-Khongso) is a Sino-Tibetan language spoken between the Kaladan and Michaung rivers in Paletwa Township, Chin State, Myanmar. It is closely related to Mru, forming the Mruic language branch, whose position within Sino-Tibetan is unclear. It consists of two dialects, Anu (Añú) and Hkongso (Khongso, Khaungtso).

Hkongso and Anu speakers self-identify as ethnic Chin people, although the Anu-Hkongso language is not classified as a Kuki-Chin language. Most Anu and Hkongso speakers can also speak Khumi. Anung has 72-76% lexical similarity with Mro-Khimi although mutual intelligibility is low, and 23-37% lexical similarity with neighbouring Chin languages.

A written orthography for Khongso was created in 2014 by Rev. Kyaw Kyaw and the Language and Social Development Organization.

== Varieties ==
Hkongso and Anu are mutually intelligible, and the languages 96-98% lexical similarity with each other. The Kasang claim to be Hkongso, and live in a small area just to the south of the main Hkongso area, in the villages of Lamoitong and Tuirong. The Anu live in scattered areas to the west of the main Hkongso area. Anu villages include Bedinwa, Onphuwa, Payung Chaung, Yeelawa, Daletsa Wa, Ohrangwa, Tuikin Along, and Khayu Chaung (Wright 2009:6).

The Anu people consider themselves to consist of 4 subgroups, namely Hkum, Hkong (Hkongso), Som, and Kla. However, the Hkongso maintain that they are an ethnic group equal to the Anu, but are not a subgroup of the Anu.

The Kasang (also known as Khenlak, Ta-aw, Hkongsa-Asang, Hkongso-Asang, Asang, and Sangta) consider themselves as ethnic Hkongso, but their language is intelligible with Khumi rather than Anu. Kasang villages include Lamoitong and Tuirong.

The Mru language is also closely related to Anu and Hkongso. The Mru had migrated to the Chittagong Hills from the Arakan Hills.

== Distribution ==
Hkongso is spoken in the following villages of Paletwa Township.

- Bahungtong
- Halawa
- Kanan
- Kanlawa
- Lakinwa
- Likkung
- Pahang
- Paletwa
- Pawa
- Phongphai
- Ringrong
- Sami
- Singkangkung
- Tengwa
- Tuikinwa
- Vadengkung
- Youngwa

Hkongso subgroups (clans) are Htey (Htey Za), Kamu, Ngan, Gwa, Hteikloeh, Ngai, Rahnam, Kapu, Kasah, Namte, Krawktu, and Namluek.

Leimi, Asang, and Likkheng are other languages spoken in the Paletwa Township area.

== Phonology ==
Hkongso has minor syllables (also known sesquisyllables), which are typical of Mon-Khmer languages (Wright 2009:12-14).

== Grammar ==
Unlike the Kuki-Chin languages, Hkongso (kʰɔŋ˥˩sʰo˦˨) has no verb stem alternation and has SVO word order (Wright 2009). Also, unlike Mru and the Kuki-Chin languages, Hkongso has Neg-V word order (pre-verbal negation) instead of the V-Neg order (post-verbal negation) found in surrounding languages.
