= Mro (Unicode block) =

- Range: U+16A40..U+16A6F (48 code points)
- Plane: SMP
- Scripts: Mro
- Major alphabets: Mro
- Assigned: 43 code points
- Unused: 5 reserved code points

Unicode version history
- 7.0 (2014): 43 (+43)

Unicode documentation
- Code chart ∣ Web page

Mro is a Unicode block containing characters for writing the Mru language.

Mro^{[1]}^{[2]} Official Unicode Consortium code chart (PDF)
	0	1	2	3	4	5	6	7	8	9	A	B	C	D	E	F
U+16A4x	𖩀	𖩁	𖩂	𖩃	𖩄	𖩅	𖩆	𖩇	𖩈	𖩉	𖩊	𖩋	𖩌	𖩍	𖩎	𖩏
U+16A5x	𖩐	𖩑	𖩒	𖩓	𖩔	𖩕	𖩖	𖩗	𖩘	𖩙	𖩚	𖩛	𖩜	𖩝	𖩞	
U+16A6x	𖩠	𖩡	𖩢	𖩣	𖩤	𖩥	𖩦	𖩧	𖩨	𖩩					𖩮	𖩯
Notes: 1. As of Unicode version 16.0; 2. Grey areas indicate non-assigned code points

== History ==
The following Unicode-related documents record the purpose and process of defining specific characters in the Mro block:

Version	Final code points (Note: Proposed code points and characters names may differ from final code points and names)	Count	L2 ID	WG2 ID	Document
7.0	U+16A40..16A5E, 16A60..16A69, 16A6E..16A6F	43	L2/09-097R	N3589R	Everson, Michael; Hosken, Martin (2009-10-27), Proposal for encoding the Mro script in the SMP of the UCS
7.0	U+16A40..16A5E, 16A60..16A69, 16A6E..16A6F	43	L2/10-416R		Moore, Lisa (2010-11-09), "C.35", UTC #125 / L2 #222 Minutes
7.0	U+16A40..16A5E, 16A60..16A69, 16A6E..16A6F	43	L2/11-122	N4010	Hosken, Martin (2011-03-17), Discussion of Mro Dandas
7.0	U+16A40..16A5E, 16A60..16A69, 16A6E..16A6F	43		N3903 (pdf, doc)	"M57.21", Unconfirmed minutes of WG2 meeting 57, 2011-03-31
7.0	U+16A40..16A5E, 16A60..16A69, 16A6E..16A6F	43	L2/11-139		Anderson, Deborah; McGowan, Rick; Whistler, Ken (2011-04-27), "5. Mro", Review of Indic-related L2 documents and Recommendations to the UTC
7.0	U+16A40..16A5E, 16A60..16A69, 16A6E..16A6F	43	L2/11-116		Moore, Lisa (2011-05-17), "D.6", UTC #127 / L2 #224 Minutes
7.0	U+16A40..16A5E, 16A60..16A69, 16A6E..16A6F	43		N4103	"T.4. Mro Dandas", Unconfirmed minutes of WG 2 meeting 58, 2012-01-03
