= Mruic languages =

Small group of Sino-Tibetan languages

Mruic
- Mru–Hkongso
- Geographic distribution: Burma, Bangladesh
- Linguistic classification: Sino-Tibetan: Central Tibeto-Burman?; Sal?; Mruic
- Subdivisions: Mru; Anu-Hkongso

Language codes
- Glottolog: mrui1235

Mruic or Mru–Hkongso is a small group of Sino-Tibetan languages consisting of two languages, Mru and Anu-Hkongso. Their relationship within Sino-Tibetan is unclear.

Peterson & Wright (2009) proposed the name Mru–Hkongso. DeLancey (2021) also uses the name Mru–Hkongso.

== Classification ==
Matisoff (2015) classifies Mru as part of the Northeast Indian areal group, a linkage that includes Tani, Deng (Digaro), "Kuki-Chin–Naga", Meithei, Mikir, and Sal.

On the other hand, Bradley (1997) classifies Mru as part of Lolo-Burmese, based on Löffler's (1966) observations that Mru shares many phonological and lexical resemblances with Lolo-Burmese.

The Mru-Hkongso group was first proposed by Peterson & Wright (2009), who do not consider it to be a subgroup of Lolo-Burmese.

Peterson (2017:205) notes that Mru and Hkongso do not have any features characteristic of Kuki-Chin languages that have been identified by VanBik (2009), including lack of the sound change Proto-Tibeto-Burman *s > tʰ, lack of Kuki-Chin-type verb stem alternation, and lack of the singular first person pronoun (1.SG) *kaj which is present in most Kuki-Chin languages.

Peterson (2009) considers Mru-Hkongso to be a separate Tibeto-Burman branch, and notes the following similarities between Mru-Hkongso and Bodo–Garo languages.

- Bodo–Garo *=kho 'accusative'; Mru =k(öj) 'accusative' (Hkongso locative =ko)
- Bodo–Garo *=ba ‘also’; Mru-Hkongso =pö ‘also’
- Bodo–Garo *–ram 'locative nominalizer'; Mru –ram 'locative nominalizer'
- Bodo–Garo *=gVn 'future marker'; Mru –köm ~ kön 'irrealis marker' (Hkongso ham)
- Bodo–Garo *–(k)ha 'past marker'; Mru –khaj ~ -hö 'past marker' (Hkongso kö ?)
- Bodo–Garo *–dV 'imperative marker'; Mru –diö 'imperative marker' (Hkongso de)

Peterson (2009) considers the similarities with Bodo–Garo to be due to the possible early split of Mruic from a Tibeto-Burman branch that included Bodo–Garo (see also Central Tibeto-Burman languages and Sal languages).

== Grammar ==
Both Mru and Hkongso display SVO (subject-verb-object) order instead of the SOV word order typical of most Tibeto-Burman languages. Bai, Sinitic, and Karenic are the only other Sino-Tibetan language branches with primarily verb-medial (SVO) word order.
