= Lama Upazila =

Lama লামা
- Upazila
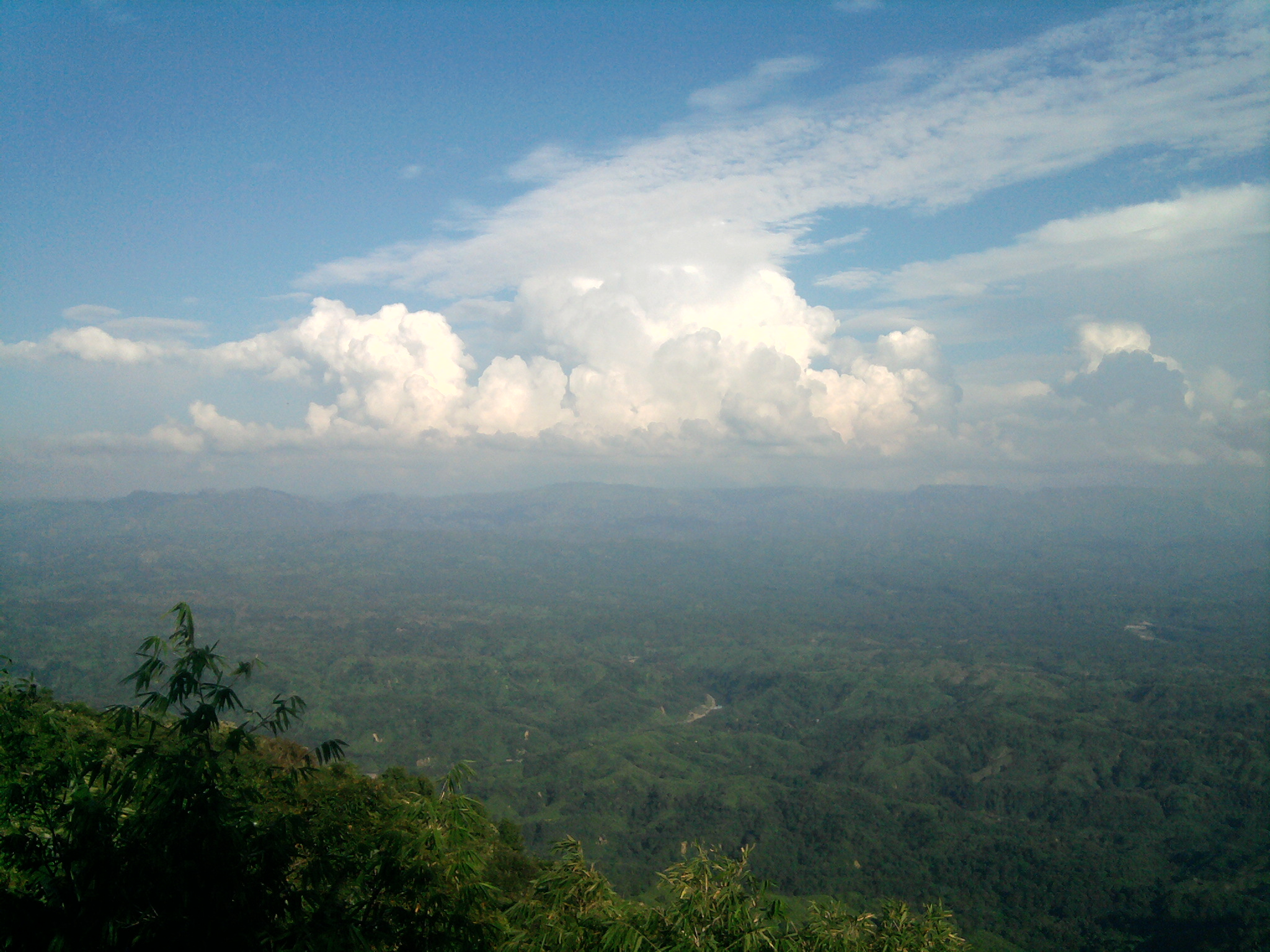
- Hills in Lama Upazila

- Coordinates: 21°46.5′N 92°12′E
- Country: Bangladesh
- Division: Chittagong
- District: Bandarban

Area
  - Total: 671.83 km^{2} (259.40 sq mi)

Population (2022)
  - Total: 139,689
  - Density: 207.92/km^{2} (538.52/sq mi)
- Time zone: UTC+6 (BST)
- Postal code: 4640
- Website: Official Map of Lama

Lama Upazila mauza geocode map

Lama (Bengali: লামা) is an upazila of Bandarban District in the Division of Chittagong, Bangladesh.

== Geography ==
Lama is located at 21.7750°N 92.2000°E. It has a total area of 671.83 km^{2}. Lama upazila is bordered by Bandarban Sadar upazila and Chittagong district to the north, Ruma and Thanchi upazilas to the east, Alikadam upazila to the south and Cox's Bazar district to the west.

== Demographics ==
According to the 2022 Bangladeshi census, Lama Upazila had 30,416 households and a population of 139,689. 12.14% of the population were under 5 years of age. Lama had a literacy rate (age 7 and over) of 65.73%: 69.71% for males and 61.68% for females, and a sex ratio of 101.98 males for every 100 females. 31,979 (22.89%) lived in urban areas.

=== Ethnicity and religion ===
Religions in Lama Upazila (2022)
Religion	Percent
Islam	71.65%
Buddhism	17.09%
Christianity	6.24%
Hinduism	2.92%
Other or not stated	2.10%

Population by religion in Union/Paurashava
Union/Paurashava	Muslim	Buddhist	Hindu	Christian	Others
Lama Paurashava	17,739	3,078	1,615	202	11
Aziznagar	11,438	665	223	371	12
Faitang	11,820	2,349	215	334	16
Fansiakhali	30,218	2,746	814	1,750	681
Gajalia	4,321	6,155	78	2,720	604
Lama Sadar	6,115	2,213	735	994	62
Rupshipara	8,285	4,968	18	439	806
Sarai	10,148	1,699	379	1,905	732

🟩 Muslim majority 🟨 Buddhist majority

As of the 2022 Bangladeshi census, Lama upazila had a total population of 139,689. The ethnic population was 33,221 (23.78%), of which Marma were 15,819, Mru 10,781 and Tripura 5,755.

Ethnicity in Lama Upazila (2022)
1. Bengali (76.2%)
2. Marma (11.3%)
3. Mro (7.72%)
4. Tripura (4.12%)
5. Others (0.62%)

Population by ethnicity in Union/Paurashava
Union/Paurashava	Bengali	Marma	Mro	Tripura	Others
Lama Paurashava	19,717	2,638	151	74	75
Aziznagar	11,683	492	173	345	16
Faitang	12,124	2,216	56	323	15
Fansiakhali	31,512	2,395	1,201	1,079	22
Gajalia	4,497	4,453	2,885	1,887	156
Lama Sadar	7,084	605	1,685	739	6
Rupshipara	9,188	2,551	2,492	270	15
Sarai	10,667	469	2,138	1,028	561

🟩 Bengali majority

== Administration ==
Lama Upazila is divided into Lama Municipality and seven union parishads: Aziznagar, Faitang, Fansiakhali, Gajalia, Lama Sadar, Rupshipara and Sarai. The union parishads are subdivided into 18 mauzas and 343 villages.

Lama Municipality is subdivided into 9 wards and 34 mahallas.

== Gallery ==
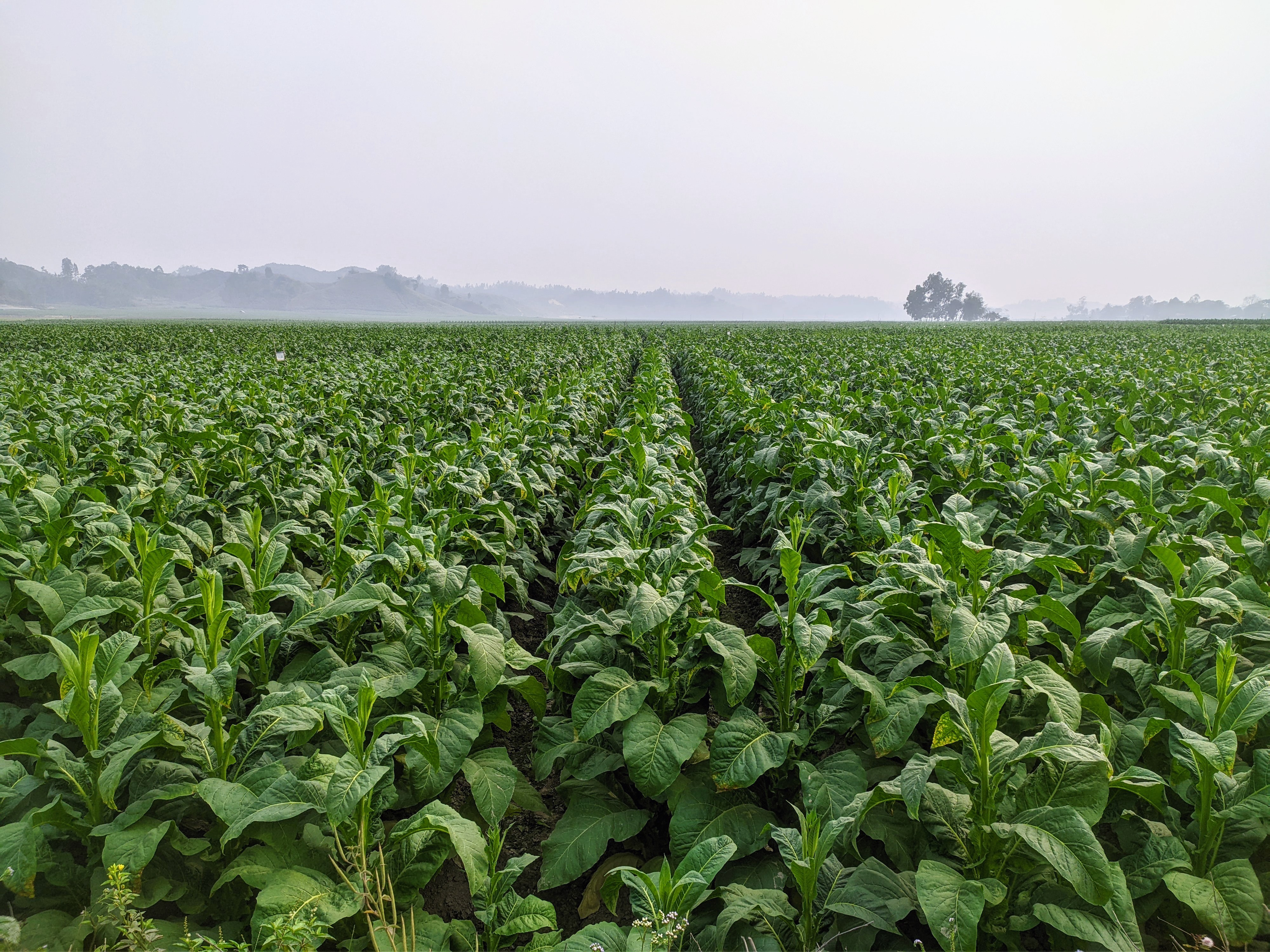
Tobacco cultivation in Lama

== See also ==
- Upazilas of Bangladesh
- Districts of Bangladesh
- Divisions of Bangladesh
