= Mru people =

Ethnic group in Bangladesh, India, and Myanmar

Mru
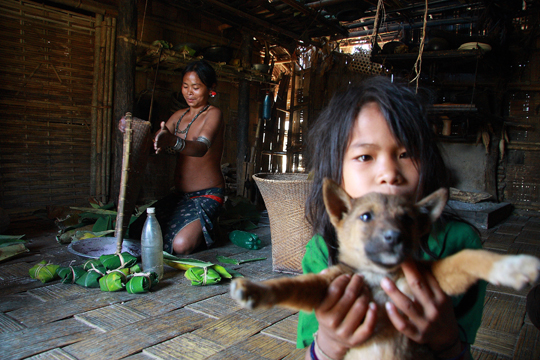
- Mru family in a traditional household

Total population
- 80,000–85,000 (2004, est.)

Regions with significant populations
- Bangladesh (Bandarban District); India (West Bengal); Myanmar (Rakhine State)
- Bangladesh: 52,455 (2021)
- India: 20,000
- Myanmar: 12,000

Languages
- Mru (dialects: Anok, Dowpreng, Sungma/Tshungma, Domrong, Rumma, Launghu)

Religion
- Majority:- Animism; Buddhism; Krama; Minority:- Christianity; Islam

Related ethnic groups
- Chin people

- People: Marucha
- Language: Mru (𖩃𖩓𖩑)
- Country: Bangladesh, Myanmar, India

The Mru people, (Note: Mru: 𖩃𖩓𖩑, Burmese:မြို, Bengali: মরং) also known as the Mro, Murong, Taung Mro, Mrung, and Mrucha, (Note: This article uses Mru for consistency.) refer to the tribes who live in the border regions between Myanmar (Burma), Bangladesh, and India. The Mru are a subgroup of the Chin people, a few of whom live in western Myanmar and are also found in the northern Rakhine State. In Bangladesh, they reside in the Chittagong Hills in southeast Bangladesh, primarily in Bandarban District and Rangamati Hill District. In India, they reside in West Bengal.

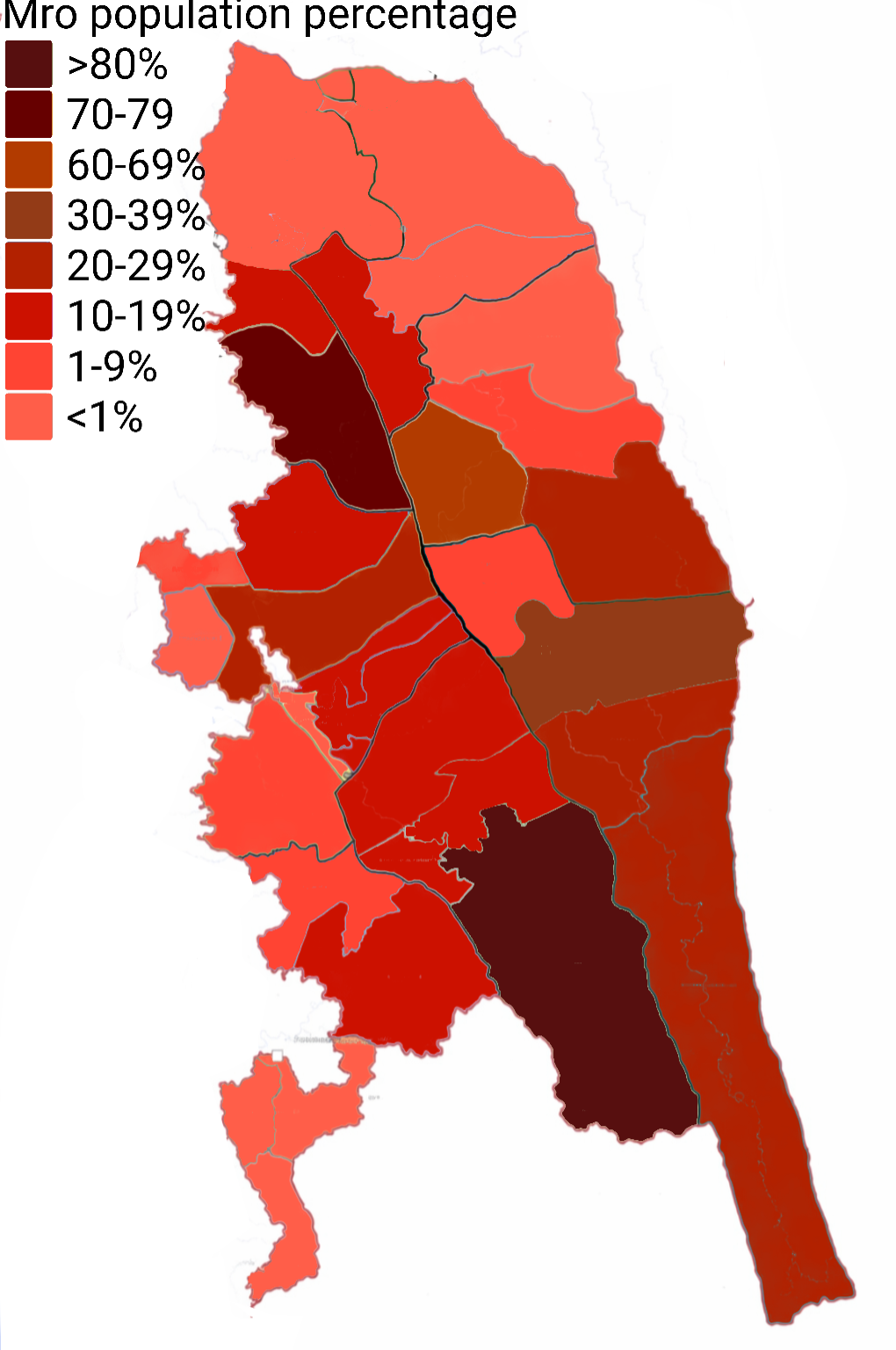
Mro population percentage by unions

The Mru people are divided into five distinct linguistic and cultural sub-groups: the Anok, Tshüngma, Dömrong, Dopteng, and Rümma. Mru are one of the seven recognized ethnic groups of Rakhine State.

== Subgroups ==
The Mru of the Chittagong region divide themselves into five culturally and linguistically distinctive groups. These are the Anok, Dömrong, the Dopreng and the Rümma.

Anok means "West". They are located in the northern group south of Bandarban. The northern group of the Tsüngma have joined the Anok, while the southern Anok have largely adopted Khumi practices in the Songu Valley adopting the name "Longhu" (an exonym by the Khumi for the Mru). The Dömrong reside in the lowlands at the home north of the Matamuri. The Dopreng and Rümma (forest people) live in the far south and so on into Arakan.

== Origin ==
The Mru claim that their ancestors lived at the source of the Kaladan River, but are unsure about when their people migrated to the region. They have no division of different exogamous clans or groups of clans, nor do they have a chieftain class or a ruling class.

According to the Arakanese chronicles, the first king of Arakan married the daughter of Chief of Mru people and later founded the city of Dhanyawadi.

The origin of the Mru people cannot be fully depicted without including the Khami (Khumi) people. Due to frequent invasions by the Shandu and subsequent British colonisation, the Khumi left their homeland. They migrated to the hilly regions surrounding the headwaters of the Kaladan River, as well as to the Pi Chaung and Mi Chaung streams in the Arakan Hill Tracts, where other Khami (Khumi) communities, along with the Mru, resided.

According to legend, the hilly region was once ruled by Nga Maung Kadon, who built the barriers that form the waterfalls in all the streams and tributaries connected to the Kalapanzin River. He did this to prevent the escape of a crocodile that had kidnapped his wife.

== History ==
The Mrus were one of the ancient tribes of Arakan that primarily lived on the surrounding hills of Kaladan and Lemro river valley and jungle. The Arakanese Chronicles mentioned the founding of Arakanese ancient city-states that included the Mro tribe. The legendary King Marayu was raised by the Chief of the Mru tribe and married his daughter, who went on to become the King of Dhanyawadi.

From the 9th century, the declining power of Waithali and the death of King Sulataing Chandra. His queen searched for the worthy heir to the throne, so that anyone whose finger fits the ring of her former king shall become the ruler of Waithali. The three Mru tribesmen on Mee Chaung stream tributary to Kaladan River were taken to the capital, where three men each ruled the kingdom till the last Mro ruler, Pe Phyu, was ousted by an invasion from the east.

The Khumi tribe defeated the Mrus and ousted them from Arakan. They moved to the Chittagong Hill Tracts sometime between the 17th and 18th centuries. Many, however, believe that this happened in the 14th century. Mrus living in the district of Khagrachari are in fact a clan of the Tripura. There is a linguistic affinity between the two groups of people. In the Indian state of Tripura, the counterparts of Mrus are known as Riangs. However, on many occasions, Mrus are contemptuously called Mro-Dang or Myawktong, meaning a lower type of animal being. But Mrus introduce themselves as Mro-cha. The word Mru means man and cha stands for being.

== Geography ==
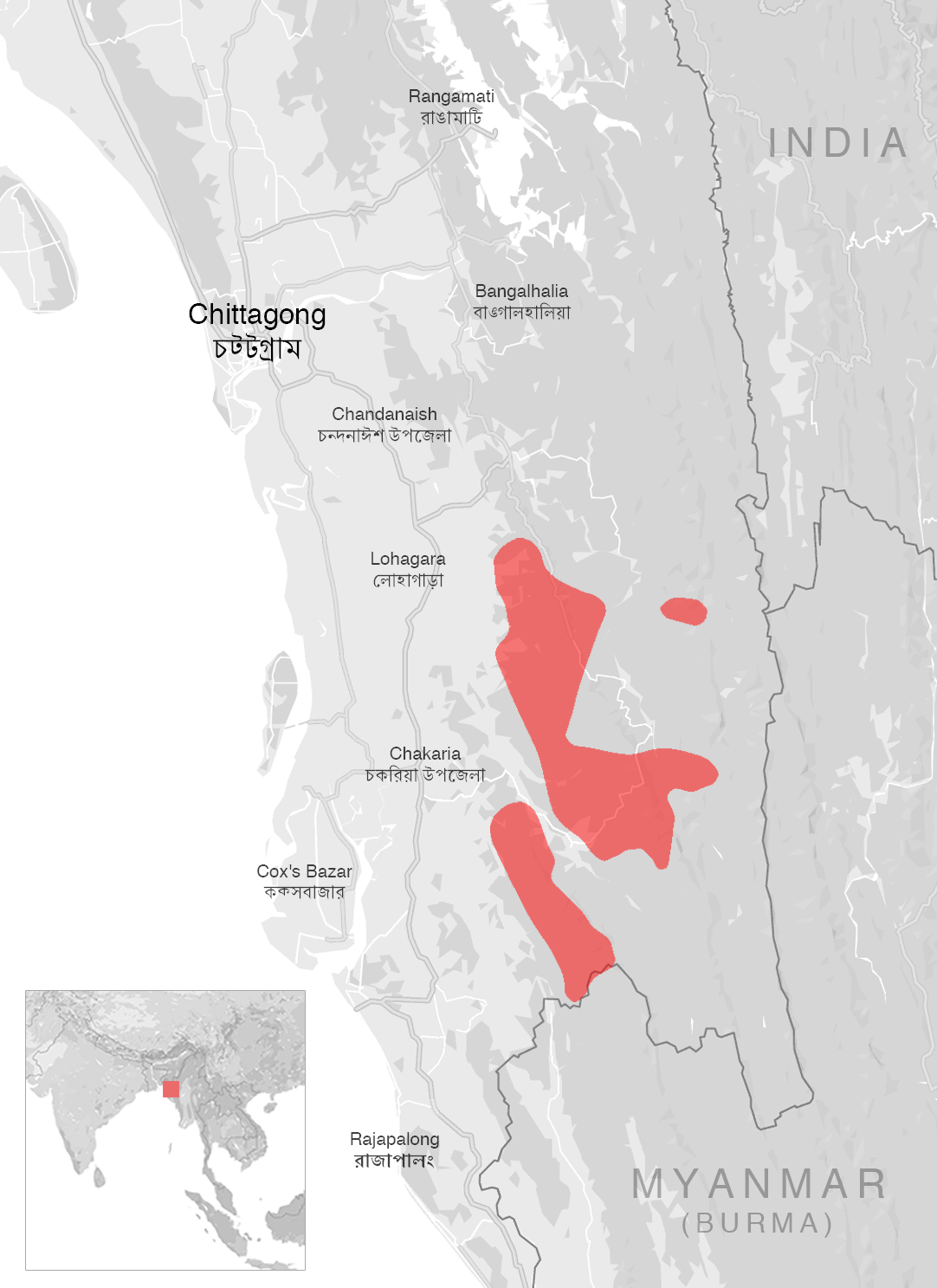
Geographic distribution of Mru People within Bangladesh

Mrus mainly live in Bandarban District(10.69%).

They are the second largest ethnic group in Alikadam Upazila (23.77%), Thanchi Upazila (23.57%) and Ruma Upazila (22%). On the sloping banks of the two streams, the Mru grow tobacco in the alluvial deposits after clearing naturally grown kaing grass. They also grow cotton, cane, and bamboo to sell in a weekly bazaar near the waterfall.

== Demographics ==
As of 1931, the Saingdin area consists of 90 hamlets and each hamlet contains between two and twenty bamboo houses. The population, according to the 1931 Census is 3,390, of which 1,779 are males. Currently, about 70,000 Mru live on the border of Myanmar with India and Bangladesh. Approximately 12,000 Mros live in Myanmar within the Yoma District and the Arakan Mountains in western Myanmar. These figures are, however, just rough estimates as the last census was conducted in 1931 when the country was under the colonial rule. At that time, the total number of Mru people was estimated around 13,766. Around 200 more villages making up of between 20,000 and 25,000 people are located in the Chittagong Hills of southern Bangladesh. Another 2,000 Mrus inhabit the districts of West Bengal, India. It is estimated that the population will grow to 85,700 by 2020.

By 2024, the Mros are the second largest ethnic group in Bandarban district, mainly living in Lama, Alikadam, Thanchi and Naiksyangchhari upazilas.

== Language and script ==
The Mru people primary speak the Mru language, a Mruic language of the Tibeto-Burman group of the Sino-Tibetan family. Dialects of Mru include Anok, Downpreng and Sungma.

The language is considered "Severely endangered" by UNESCO.

Traditionally, the Mru have had no written script for their spoken language though some Mru can read and write Burmese or Bangla. The Mru language is written in both Latin and the Mro alphabet, created in the 1980s by Man Ley Mru. An estimated 80% of Mru are literate in the Mro alphabet.

Until the 1980s, the Mro language did not have an alphabet. It was only a language of oral communication. In 1982, a Mro teenager named Kramadi Menle introduced the alphabet of this language.

== Religion ==
=== Buddhism ===
The majority of the Mru follow Theravada Buddhism, however, many self-reported Mru Buddhists also practice Animism. Several scholars also observe that many of the religious practices and rituals of the Mru often lack explicit Buddhist characteristics.

=== Krama religion ===
In 1984, Manlay Mro (also known as Manlay Mru/Murong) established the "krama" faith. Krama is currently the first most followed religion among the Mru. The central text of the faith, known as the Reyung Khiti ("Good Ethics"), builds on the teachings of the Hindu, Christian, and Buddhist faiths. At age twelve, Krama boys and girls participate in a coming-of-age ceremony.

=== Christianity ===
Despite the efforts of European missionaries to convert the Mru people, only a small fraction of the Mru have converted, the rest remaining Buddhists. Christianization efforts have been hindered by ongoing political turmoil within the region. In recent years, a large fraction of the Mro are now Christians.

=== Islam ===
A small community of Mru people in Bangladesh have adopted Islam as their faith.

== Cosmology ==
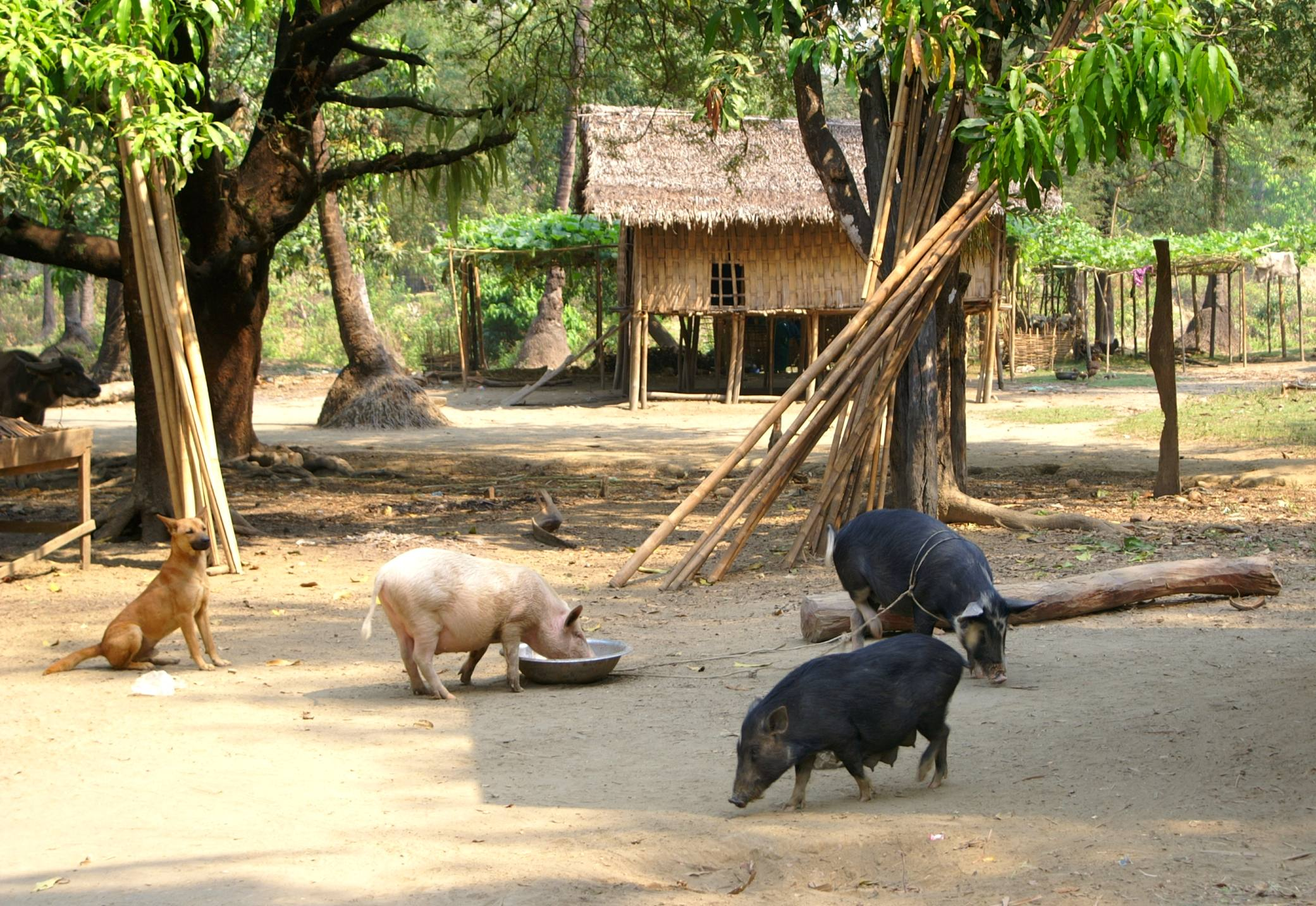
A traditional Mru village in Chin State, Myanmar.

The Mru people hold a number of traditional beliefs regarding cosmology.

Among the Mru, the sun is associated with femininity and the moon is associated with masculinity. Mru folklore holds that the earth is carried upon the shoulders of a Nāga; earthquakes are brought about by the Naga's tremors, testing whether humans remain on the earth. Other traditional beliefs hold that rainbows are bridges by which Nats descend upon the earth and eclipses are caused by the divine imprisonment of the sun and moon.

== Taungya ==
The Mru, like other ethnic groups from the hilly regions of Southeast Asia, practice taungya cultivation. They cultivate on the hillsides after cutting down the trees, which usually takes a month. This process usually occurs in January or February. Around March, they burn the trees that are taken down for taungya paddy cultivation, and they start sowing in April. When they sow the seeds separately in pits, they use spades, which are made with a long handle from an old taungya-cutting-dah (knife) that is no longer usable.

== Traditional rites and rituals ==
=== Birth ===
After the birth of a child, four short bamboos are placed on the bank of the stream. A chicken is then killed in honor of the nats, and its blood is poured over the bamboos that are put close together. A prayer is then made for the well-being of the child. The chicken is then dumped.

=== New Taungya Cutting ===
Before the start of a new taungya cultivation, the villagers collectively buy two goats, and two fowls are gathered from each household. One of the goats is put in front of the hut closest to the stream, and the other near the second hut. The fowls are then placed between the two huts. After the villagers pray for good health and the abundance of crops for the coming taungya cultivation, both the goats and fowls are slaughtered one after another, starting from the goat nearest to the stream. The blood of the animals is then sprayed over the small huts and the flowing water. The villagers then cook the goats, and the fowls are reclaimed by their respective owners. With the meat and khaung, they make an offering to the nat before they begin the feast. Meanwhile, the village is shut down for three days, and the villagers fix up bamboo arches over the village path. If anyone enters the village during this time period, compensation has to be paid to cover all the expenses incurred. This ceremony is celebrated once a year and after the ceremony, they can start their taungya cultivation for the year.

=== Beginning of Taungya Harvest ===
After the taungya fruits and vegetables are ready for the harvest, household members go into their taungyas and collect several different vegetables and fruits with a few plants of paddy. The vegetables and fruits are then put into a big basket and paddy into khaung pot. A fowl is then killed and its blood sprinkled over the khaung pot and the vegetable basket. Another fowl is cooked using rice flour mixed with salt and ginger. Then the rice is mixed with the khaung and together with the fowl, they made an offering in various different baskets to the nats who live in the staircase of the house. Neighbors are then invited to enjoy the rest of the meat. This natpwe is held on the same day by different households in a village. Villagers can harvest their produce after the ceremony.

=== End of Taungya Harvest ===
After all the crops have been harvested, every household kills a pig or two and cooks some pieces of pork in a bamboo tube. The household members then take the meat along with rice and khaung to their taungya. Once they arrived at their taungya, offerings are made to various nats roaming near the streams close to the taungya. They then pray to the nats for their physical well-being. After they returned home, they threw a feast with the rest of the pork and khaung. This pwe is also celebrated on the same day by all the villagers.

=== Funeral ===
Upon the death of a Mru individual, their body is put in a coffin made of split colored bamboo and, in some cases, rugs and blankets. The body is then cremated, and the remaining unburnt pieces of bones are collected; after being stored in the village for 2–3 months, they are stored in a small hut constructed above the location at which the body was cremated.

In the case of death by contagious disease (especially small-pox and cholera) the deceased individual is buried immediately and no hut is constructed.

== Marriage law ==
A man usually discusses with his father about the woman he intends to marry. The father along with his son and a few other villagers visits the house of the prospective bride. They bring three birds, a spear, and a dah (dagger) with them, and the spear and the dah are given to the bride's parents as presents, and the fowls for the family to eat. In return, the bride's family cooks pork for the visitors. The visitors must not eat the fowls and the hosts the pork. The bride's father then consults with her daughter and, after getting her consent, asks for a dowry. In 1931, it usually consisted of around Rs. 100, and the groom's father may not bargain. After the dowry is settled, the groom's party stays for three days, feasting on khaung and leaves the next day. However, in case of a marriage contracted between the couple without the parental consent, for instance, in a case in which a man elopes with a woman to his parents' house, the parents, with the village elders, return the bride to her parents along with three fowls and khaung. The groom's parents then ask what dowry the bride's parents would like to accept. The dowry, in this case, can be as high as Rs. 100 or as low as Rs. 30. Similar procedures to the one mentioned above take place, except that the groom's family does not stay over for a night but returns home with the couple. Then the marriage date is chosen. The bride visits her home occasionally but never returns to live there permanently. If either party breaks the promise of marriage, no action is taken as long as either the bride or the groom claims that one does not love the other. If the bride breaks the promise, half of the dowry has to be returned, whereas if the groom breaks the promise, his family loses the dowry. If the husband dies, the heir is entitled to nothing; she has to abandon the issue of marriage, if any, with her father-in-law or a brother-in-law. The rate of child marriage is high.

== Dress ==
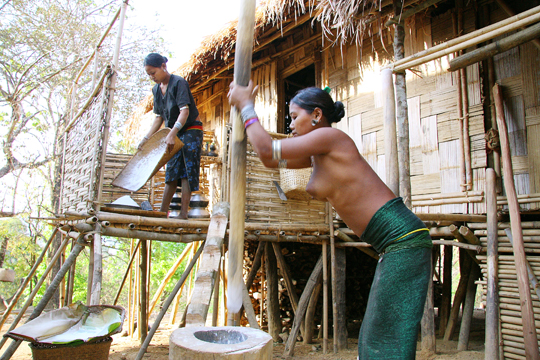
Mru women working in a village in Bangladesh. One of them is wearing traditional clothing.

Men wear Burmese jackets, called "Kha-ok", and a cloth on their heads that does not cover the top. These two pieces of clothing were bought from Indian hawkers. They cover the lower part of their bodies with a loincloth, which is tied around the waist twice and passed between the thighs with both ends hanging downwards, one at the front and the other at the back. The loincloth is made by themselves. Unlike Awa Khami women, who wear a piece of cloth covering the breast and the back, the Mru women are topless before marriage, with the lower part of the body covered by a short cloth. This skirt is woven from yarn obtained from Indian merchants. Some wealthy women add a string of copper pieces to the string of beads around the waist. They also wear silver earrings, which are hollow tubes about three inches long.

== Chiasotpoi ==
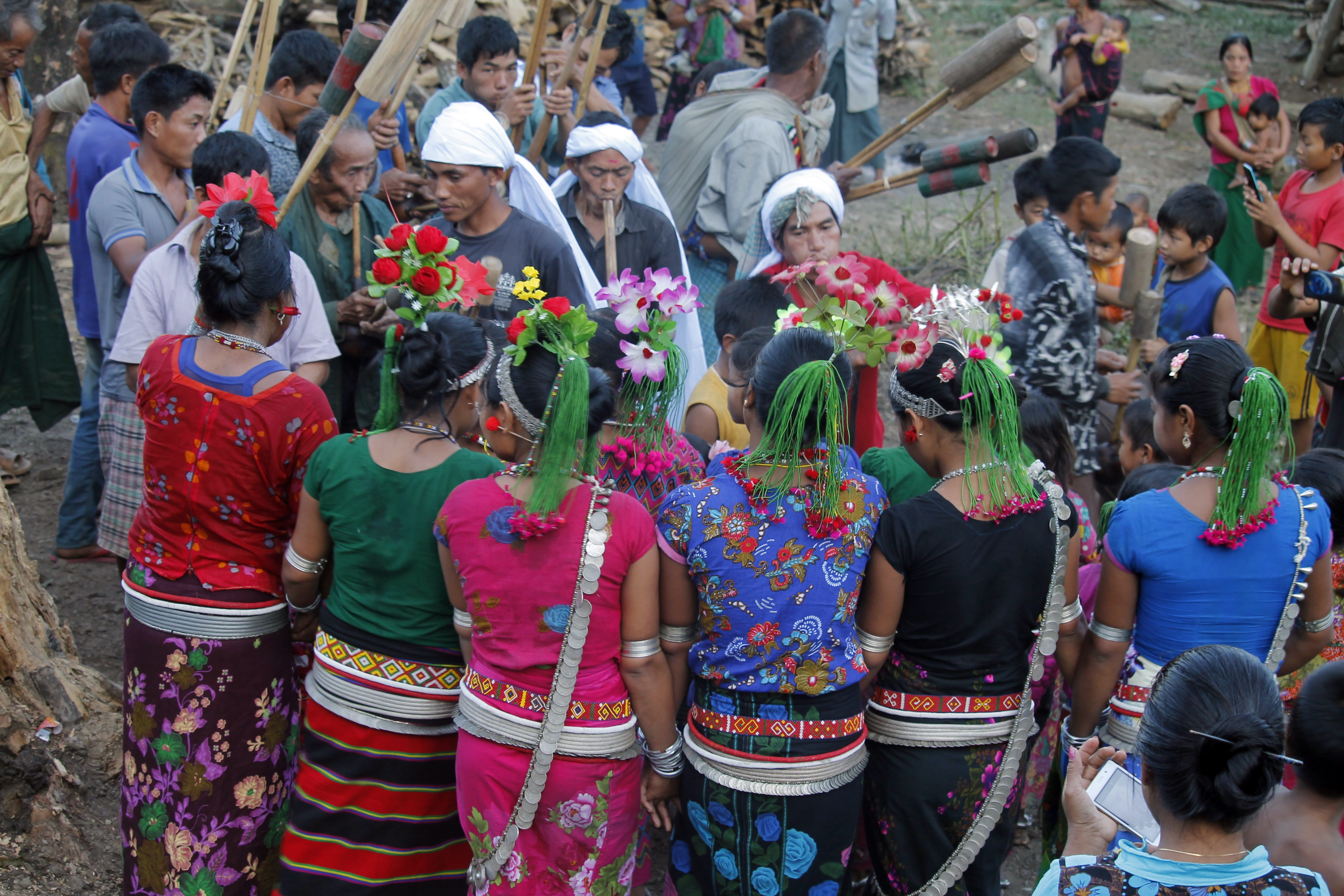
Women performing the Chiasotpoi dance.

Mru women performing the Chiasotpoi dance (video)

One of the biggest social rites of the Mru people is Chiasotpoi. At least one cow or more is sacrificed in devotion to the sacred spirit with the intention of being free from ill or any curse that has been suffered. A full night of dancing and playing ploong takes place and continues onto the next day. After a full night of dancing, early in the morning, the cow is killed by a spear. Then its tongue is cut off. The villagers then move to sit on the body of the cow, putting a turban on their head. Rice beer or alcohol is served during the feast. After cooking the meat and most of the cow, all the villagers come together and enjoy the feast. There is no fixed time for the ceremony, as anybody who can afford it can organize it anytime. Guests are allowed to take part. According to one witness, they were told: "Long time ago, almighty summoned the Mru to take their letters. In that time all the people were so busy with work. For bringing the letters, they send a cow. Cow according to their order went, received and then set to move back. On the halfway, the cow felt so hungry and took rest under a fig tree. During then, unconsciously the letter plate was swallowed down into her stomach. On return, the Mru people learned the story of losing the letters and fired on the cow. The chief of the Mru first hit the mouth, thus all the upper teeth of the cow were broken. While the almighty spirit cross-checked, they complain about the swallowing incident and the spirit asked them to punish the cow by act anything they want to. And that was proclaimed as No Sin. Hence, the angered Mru people decided to kill the cow and then cut off the tongue as punishment. Thus the ceremony started and being regarded as one of the highest ought of all the rituals they follow. And you see, it why the cow has no upper teeth yet.

== Musical instruments ==
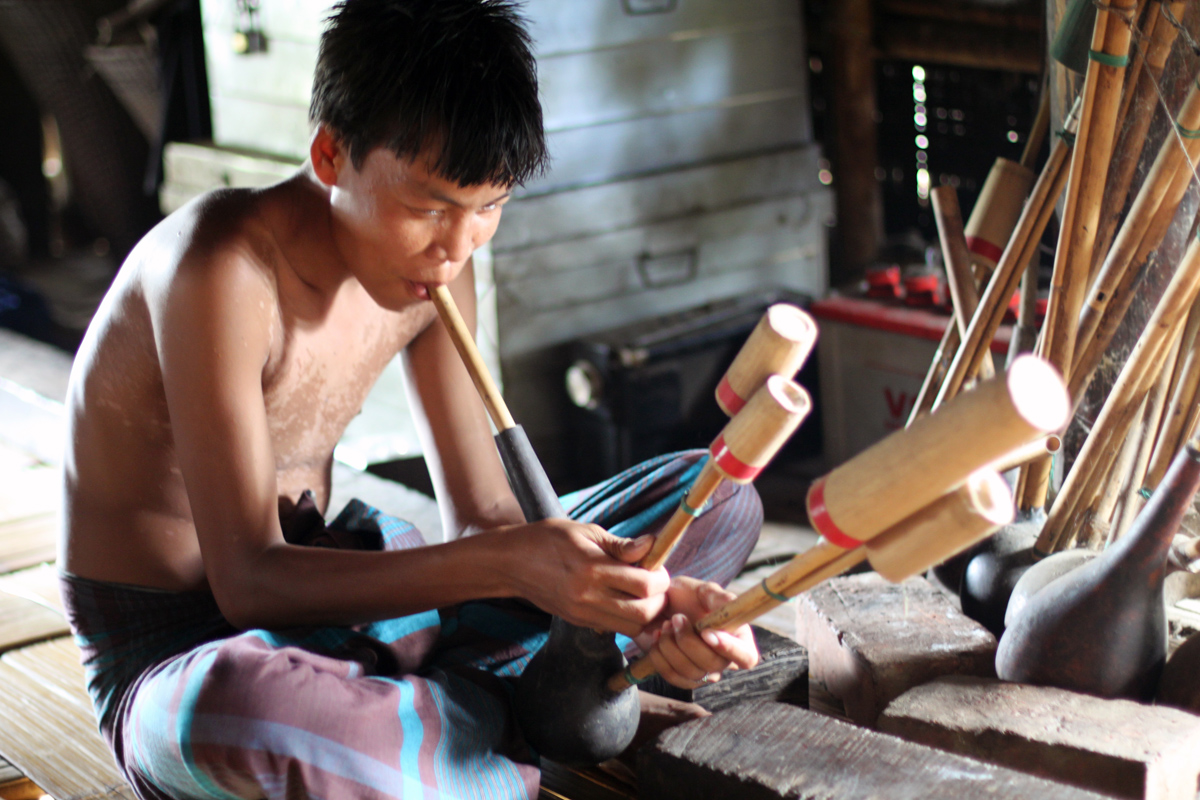
A Mru boy playing the ploong.

=== The Plung Mouth-Organ ===
Among the distinctive cultural aspects of the Mru is the ploong, a type of mouth- organ made of a number of bamboo pipes, each with a separate reed.

The ploong mouth-organ has two main components: a wind-chest and several pipes. The wind-chest is made from a calabash gourd. An opening is pierced in the neck, through which a bamboo pipe used as a mouthpiece is inserted. The upper part of the wind-chest is pierced with as many holes as there are sound pipes, usually from three to five. The pipes are arranged in two rows, and the left hand plays the row behind while the right hand plays the one in front. Indeed, each pipe sounds only if the small finger-hole drilled on its side is closed. Each sound pipe, cut from a stalk of bamboo and closed at the base, contains a free reed. The reed is whittled directly in the bark (idioglottic reed) after the bark has been thinned. A small ball of wax pressed onto the base of the reed is used to fine-tune the pipe to give the orchestra a homogeneous sound. The segment of the pipe that contains the reed is stuck into the wind-chest, and the joint is plugged with beeswax. A finger-hole is drilled into the outer part of the pipe, and to finish off the instrument, a bamboo cap is put over the other end of the pipe in order to attenuate the tone and produce a more velvety sound.

== Sources ==
- "Indigenous Peoples Development Planning Document: Indigenous Peoples Development Plan: Bangladesh: Chittagong Hill", Asian Development Bank
- "Become Acquainted With The Peace-Loving Mru", bangladesh.com
- "From the land of the sunrise", Dhaka, Bangladesh, 18–24 August 2006, Life & Struggles of the Mro People in Bangladesh.
- van Schendel, Willem, "A Politics of Nudity: Photographs of the ‘Naked Mru’ of Bangladesh", Modern Asian Studies, 36, 2 (2002), pp. 341–374. Cambridge University Press
- Brauns, Claus-Dieter; Löffler, Lorenz G., Mru: hill people on the border of Bangladesh, Birkhäuser Verlag, 1990
- "Asian People Group Profiles: Bangladesh: The Mru", Asia Harvest
- Peterson, David A., "Where does Mru fit into Tibeto-Burman?", The 42nd International Conference on Sino-Tibetan Languages and Linguistics (ICSTLL 42), November 2009, Payap University, Chiangmai, Thailand. Cf. p. 14.
- Brauns, Claus-Dieter; Löffler, Lorenz G. (1990). Mru: Hill people on the Border of Bangladesh. Germany: Springer. ISBN 978-3-0348-5696-6.
- Beniison, J.J. (1933). Census of India, 1931: Burma Part I – Report. Rangoon: Office of Superintendent, Government Printing and Stationery, Burma. p. 250.
