= Kasiais Union =

Union of Patiya Upazila, Chittagong District, Bangladesh

Kasiais Union কাশিয়াইশ ইউনিয়ন
- Union
- Location in Bangladesh
- Coordinates: 22°16.5′N 91°55.5′E
- Country: Bangladesh
- Division: Chittagong Division
- District: Chittagong District
- Upazilas: Patiya Upazila

Government
  - Chairman: Vacant

Area
  - Total: 10.22 km^{2} (3.95 sq mi)

Population (2011)
  - Total: 10,701
- Time zone: UTC+6 (BST)
- Postal code: 4371
- Website: kasiaisup.chattogram.gov.bd

Kasiais Union (Bengali: কাশিয়াইশ ইউনিয়ন) is a union, the smallest administrative body of Bangladesh, located in Patiya Upazila, Chittagong District, Bangladesh. The total population is 10,701.

== Area ==
The area of Kasiais Union is 2,526 acres (10.22 square kilometres).

== Demographics ==
According to the 2011 Bangladeshi census, Kasiais Union had a population of 10,701, of which 5,297 were males and 5,404 were females. The total number of households was 2,244.

== Geography ==
Kasiais Union is located in the southwestern part of Patiya Upazila, approximately 8 kilometres from the upazila headquarters. It is bounded to the east by Asia Union, to the north by Baralia Union, Kusumpura Union, and Jiri Union, to the west by Jiri Union and Chatari Union of Anwara Upazila, and to the south by Paraikora Union of Anwara Upazila.

== Administration ==
Kasiais Union is the 8th Union Parishad under Patiya Upazila. The administrative activities of the union fall under the jurisdiction of Patiya Thana. It is part of Chittagong-12 (Constituency 289) of the National Parliament of Bangladesh. The villages in the union are as follows:

Villages
No.	Village name
1	Budhpura
2	Pingala
3	Dwarak
4	Perpera
5	Mahira Perpera
6	Kasiais
7	Bhandargaon
8	Bakkhain

== Education ==
According to the 2011 Bangladeshi census, Kasiais Union had a literacy rate of 59.1%.
