= Asia Union =

Union of Patiya Upazila, Chittagong District, Bangladesh

Asia Union আশিয়া ইউনিয়ন
- Union
- Location in Bangladesh
- Coordinates: 22°16′N 91°56.5′E
- Country: Bangladesh
- Division: Chittagong Division
- District: Chittagong District
- Upazilas: Patiya Upazila

Government
  - Chairman: Vacant

Area
  - Total: 7.20 km^{2} (2.78 sq mi)

Population (2011)
  - Total: 13,428
- Time zone: UTC+6 (BST)
- Postal code: 4370
- Website: asiaup.chattogram.gov.bd

Asia Union (Bengali: আশিয়া ইউনিয়ন) is a union, the smallest administrative body of Bangladesh, located in Patiya Upazila, Chittagong District, Bangladesh. The total population is 13,428.

== Area ==
The area of Asia Union is 1,780 acres (7.20 square kilometres).

== Demographics ==
According to the 2011 Bangladeshi census, Asia Union had a population of 13,428, of which 6,431 were males and 6,997 were females. The total number of households was 2,749.

== Geography ==
Asia Union is located in the southern part of Patiya Upazila, approximately 8 kilometres from the upazila headquarters. It is bounded to the east by Chanhara Union, to the north by Baralia Union, to the west by Kasiais Union and Paraikora Union of Anwara Upazila, and to the south by Paraikora Union of Anwara Upazila.

== Administration ==
Asia Union is the 8th (A) Union Parishad under Patiya Upazila. The administrative activities of the union fall under the jurisdiction of Patiya Thana. It is part of Chittagong-12 (Constituency 289) of the National Parliament of Bangladesh. The villages in the union are as follows:

Villages
No.	Village name
1	Asia Mollapara
2	Asia Mirzapara
3	Central Asia
4	Asia kamalapara
5	South Asia (Rashidpur)
6	East Asia
7	East Bathua
8	West Bathua
9	Bathua Barua Para
10	Asia West Mirza Para
11	Satgar Para

== Education ==
According to the 2011 Bangladeshi census, Asia Union had a literacy rate of 50.8%.
