= Barasat Union, Anwara =

Union of Anwara Upazila, Chittagong District, Bangladesh

Barasat Union বারশত ইউনিয়ন
- Union
- Location in Bangladesh
- Coordinates: 22°11.8′N 91°50.5′E
- Country: Bangladesh
- Division: Chittagong Division
- District: Chittagong District
- Upazilas: Anwara Upazila

Area
  - Total: 12.98 km^{2} (5.01 sq mi)

Population (2011)
  - Total: 28,865
- Time zone: UTC+6 (BST)
- Postal code: 4376
- Website: barasatup.chattogram.gov.bd

Barasat Union (Bengali: বারশত ইউনিয়ন) is a union, the smallest administrative body of Bangladesh, located in Anwara Upazila, Chittagong District, Bangladesh. The total population is 28,865.

== Area ==
The area of Barasat Union is 3,208 acres (12.98 square kilometers).

== Demographics ==
According to the 2011 Bangladeshi census, Barasat Union had a population of 28,865, of which 14,235 were males and 14,630 were females. The total number of households was 5,460.

== Geography ==
Barasat Union is located in the western part of Anwara Upazila, approximately 8 kilometres from the upazila headquarters. It is bounded on the south by Roypur Union, on the east by Battali Union, on the north by Bairag Union, and on the west by the estuary of the Karnaphuli River and the Bay of Bengal.

== Administration ==
Barasat Union is the 2nd Union Parishad under Anwara Upazila. The administrative activities of the union fall under the jurisdiction of Anwara Thana. It is part of the Chittagong-13 (Constituency 290) of the National Parliament of Bangladesh. The villages of Barasat Union are:

Villages
No	Village
1	Barasat
2	Boalia
3	Chalitatoli
4	Dudhkumra
5	Gobadia
6	Gundwip
7	Paschimchal

== Education ==
According to the 2011 Bangladeshi census, Barasat Union had a literacy rate of 49.4%.
