= Haildhar Union =

Union of Anwara Upazila, Chittagong District, Bangladesh

Haildhar Union হাইলধর ইউনিয়ন
- Union
- Location in Bangladesh
- Coordinates: 22°11.5′N 91°56.5′E
- Country: Bangladesh
- Division: Chittagong Division
- District: Chittagong District
- Upazilas: Anwara Upazila

Government
  - Chairman: Vacant

Area
  - Total: 15.72 km^{2} (6.07 sq mi)

Population (2011)
  - Total: 25,315
- Time zone: UTC+6 (BST)
- Postal code: 4377
- Website: haildharup.chattogram.gov.bd

Haildhar Union (Bengali: হাইলধর ইউনিয়ন) is a union, the smallest administrative body of Bangladesh, located in Anwara Upazila, Chittagong District, Bangladesh. The total population is 25,315.

== Area ==
The area of Haildhar Union is 3,885 acres (15.72 square kilometers).

== Demographics ==
According to the 2011 Bangladeshi census, Haildhar Union had a population of 25,315, of which 11,869 were males and 13,446 were females. The total number of households was 4,979.

== Geography ==
Haildhar Union is located in the eastern part of Anwara Upazila, approximately 8 kilometres from the upazila headquarters. It is bordered on the west by Barakhain Union, Anwara Union, and Chatari Union; on the north by Barakhain Union and Paraikora Union; on the east by Paraikora Union, Barkal Union, Barama Union, Sangu River, and Chatari Union of Satkania Upazila; and on the south by Pukuria Union of Banshkhali Upazila.

== Administration ==
Haildhar Union is the 10th Union Parishad under Anwara Upazila. The administrative activities of this union fall under the jurisdiction of Anwara Thana. It is part of Chittagong-13 (Constituency 290) of the National Parliament of Bangladesh. The villages of Haildhar Union are:

Villages
No	Village
1	Khashkhama
2	Kunirbil
3	Hetikhain
4	North Iskhali
5	South Iskhali
6	Gujra
7	Tekota
8	Malghar
9	Haildhar
10	Pirkhain

== Education ==
According to the 2011 Bangladeshi census, Haildhar Union had a literacy rate of 73.7%.

== Rivers and Canals ==
The Sangu River flows along the eastern and western sides of Haildhar Union. Additionally, the Chanikhali Canal, Iskhali-Kodala Canal, and Yunus Canal flow through this union.

== Markets ==
The main markets in Haildhar Union are Malghar Bazar, Fakir Hat, Paler Hat, and Khodar Hat.
