= Burumchhara Union =

Union of Anwara Upazila, Chittagong District, Bangladesh

Burumchhara Union বরুমছড়া ইউনিয়ন
- Union
- Location in Bangladesh
- Coordinates: 22°10′N 91°53′E
- Country: Bangladesh
- Division: Chittagong Division
- District: Chittagong District
- Upazilas: Anwara Upazila

Area
  - Total: 23.98 km^{2} (9.26 sq mi)

Population (2011)
  - Total: 20,061
- Time zone: UTC+6 (BST)
- Postal code: 4378
- Website: barumcharaup.chattogram.gov.bd

Burumchhara Union (Bengali: বরুমছড়া ইউনিয়ন) is a union, the smallest administrative body of Bangladesh, located in Anwara Upazila, Chittagong District, Bangladesh. The total population is 20,061.

== Area ==
The area of Burumchhara Union is 5,927 acres (23.98 square kilometers).

== Demographics ==
According to the 2011 Bangladeshi census, Burumchhara Union had a population of 20,061, of which 9,582 were males and 10,479 were females. The total number of households was 3,913.

== Geography ==
Burumchhara Union is located in the southern part of Anwara Upazila, approximately 3 kilometres from the upazila headquarters. It is bounded on the west by Juidandi Union and Battali Union, on the north by Barakhain Union, on the east by Barakhain Union, and on the south by Pukuria Union of Banshkhali Upazila and the Sangu River.

== Administration ==
Burumchhara Union is the 5th Union Parishad under Anwara Upazila. The administrative activities of the union fall under the jurisdiction of Anwara Thana. It is part of the Chittagong-13 (Constituency 290) of the National Parliament of Bangladesh. The villages of Burumchhara Union are:

Villages
No	Village
1	Burumchhara
2	Naldia

== Education ==
According to the 2011 Bangladeshi census, Burumchhara Union had a literacy rate of 38.5%.
