= Sheikh Sachi Muhammad Naqshbandi =

Bengali Sufi saint

Sheikh Sachi Muhammad Naqsbandi
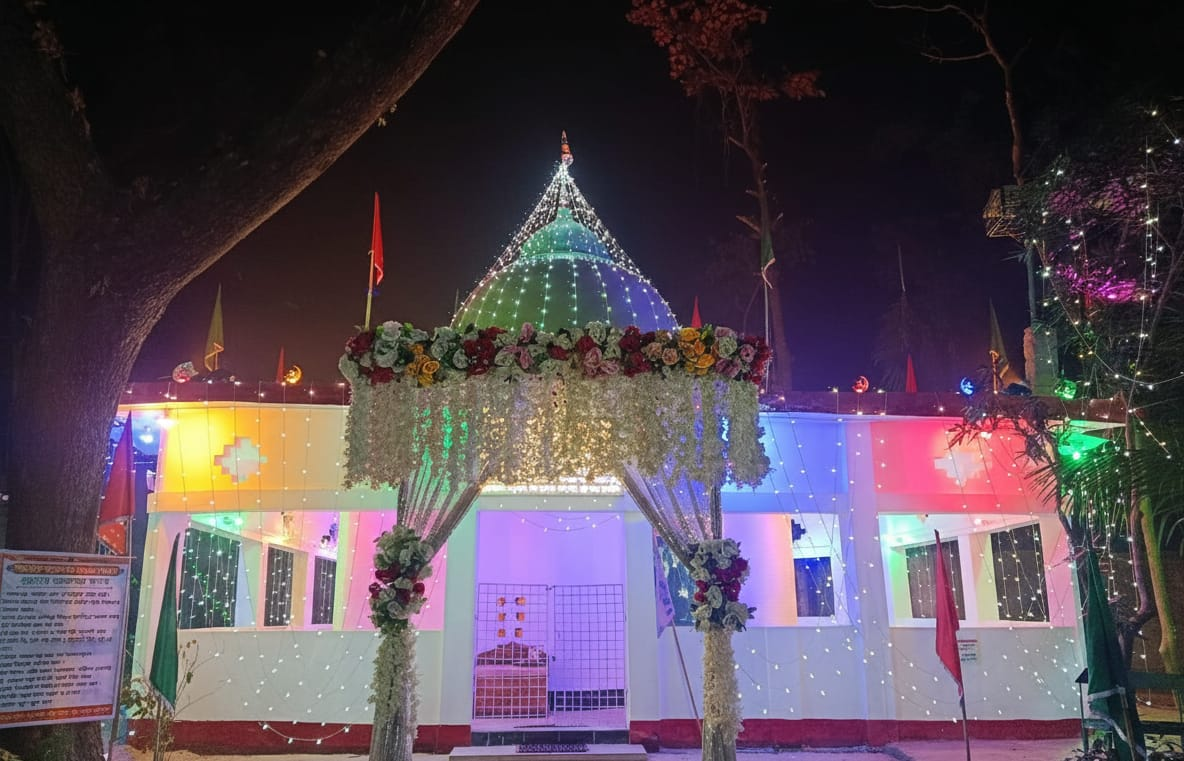
- Shrine of Sheikh Sachi Muhammad Naqsbandi

Personal life
- Born: 1686 Chakrashala, Patiya, Chittagong
- Died: 13 January 1780 (aged 93–94) Oskhain, Anwara, Chittagong
- Resting place: Buye Khawaja Dighi Bank, Oskhain, Anwara, Chittagong
- Children: Ali Raza
- Parent: Sheikh Bashir Mahmud (Shah Monohar) (father)
- Citizenship: Present-day Chittagong, Bangladeshi
- Region: Chittagong
- Main interest(s): Fiqh, Sufism, Tafsir, Hadith

Religious life
- Religion: Islam
- Denomination: Sunni
- Philosophy: Sufism
- Jurisprudence: Hanafi

Muslim leader
- Predecessor: Bashir Mahmud Monohar Al Naqsbandi
- Successor: Ali Raza
- Influenced by: Abu Bakr Siddiq, Ali, Bayazid Bastami,Rumi, Sheikh Bashir Mahmud (Shah Monohar)
- Influenced: Ali Raza, Buye Khawaja, Oli Khawaja

Sheikh Sachi Muhammad Naqsbandi was a prominent 17th-century Sufi saint and Islamic preacher. He played a key role in spreading Sufism and particularly Naqsbandi order across in the Chittagong region. Known for his spiritual wisdom and character, he held a respected place in the society of his time.

== Life and Lineage ==
Sheikh Sachi Muhammad Naqsbandi was born around 1686 AD (6th Muharram 1097 AH / 1047 Maghi). His father was Sheikh Bachir Mahmud. He was a direct descendant of Abu Bakr, the first Caliph of Islam. When he was born, the Chittagong region was under the control of the Arakan kingdom. He was a scholar of the Quran, Hadith and Islamic law (fiqh). He played a key role in preaching Islam throughout the Arakan and Chittagong regions, and many people converted to Islam through his teachings and guidance. He was also known for his great generosity- he donated half of his inherited land, 80 out of 160 dauns ( a local unit of land measurement), to religious and charitable causes.

== Family life and descendants ==
He married Sayyida Zobayda Khanam, who was also known as 'Ma Paran Bibi'. Zobayda Khanam was a descendant of Abdul Qadir Gilani and Abdur Rahim Maghfuri. After their marriage, he settled in the 'Gontobyo Joar' (Sabujgram) area of Chittagong. The couple had a son named Syed Ali Raza (Kanu Shah), who later became a renowned medieval poet and Sufi Saint. Ali Raza wrote a verse biography of his father in 'Shahnama', the third volume of his famous epic Gyansagar. When Ali Raza was just 13 years old, Sheikh Sachi Muhammad granted him the Khilafat (spiritual leadership) and Khilka (spiritual robe), naming him his spiritual successor.

== Ancestral background and arrival in Chittagong ==
Sheikh Sachi Muhammad Naqsbandi came from a family with a long tradition of spiritual and scholarly learning. According to family records, he was a descendant of Sheikh Mina Muhammad Al Naqsbandi, who was a direct lineage descendant of the famous Sufi Saint and poet Jalaluddin Rumi. In 1560, his ancester Daulat Muhammad moved with his son Pakha Khan to Gaur via Murshidabad, India and settled there. In Gaur, they established the Khankah-e-Naqshbandiyya Siddiqiyya Maulaviyya Tabriziyya to preach Islam and spread the Naqshbandi and Maulavi Sufi orders. Before 1575, Pakha Khan moved from Gaur to the Chakrasala region of Chittagong along with his three sons. His descendant and Sheikh Sachi Muhammad's father, Sheikh Bashir Muhammad Khan al-Naqsbandi, played a leading role in preaching Islam in Chittagong during that period. According to historical accounts, Nawab Khan Bahadur became his disciple and, out of respect, gifted him 160 dauns of tax free land to support his work. Sheikh Sachi Muhammad later inherited this vast estate.

== Propagation of religion and spiritual life ==
Sheikh Sachi Muhammad Naqshbandi used his inherited property and spiritual influence to spread Islam. He promated Sufi philoshpy among the local Buddist and Hindu communities, donating half of his land (80 dauns) for this purpose. Built in his memory, the Sachi Mosque in Cox's Bazar is recognized as a historic landmark of the region. He was a high ranking master in both the Naqshbandi and Suhrawardiyya Sufi orders. He organized spiritual gathering and Mahfil-e-Sama (Sufi music sessions). He has numerous disciples and spiritual representatives (Khalifas, most notably Oli Khaja and Buye Khawaja. Out of respect of his master, his disciple Buye Khawaja dug a large pond, which is locally known today as "Buye Khawaja Dighi" or "Bejar Di".

=== Death and burial ===
Sheikh Sachi Muhammad Naqshbandi passed away 13 January 1780 AD (14th Muharram 1193 AH / 29th Poush 1141 Maghi). According to his last wish, he was buried on the eastern side of the pond dug by his disciple Buye Khawaja in Oskhain village of Anwara Upazila, Chittagong. Every year on 13 January, his annual Fateha and Urs ceremony are observed at the Gausia Rahmania Maula Manzil of Oskain Darbar Sharif in Anwara, Chittagong. Numerous devotees and followers from home and abroad attend this event.

== Gallery ==
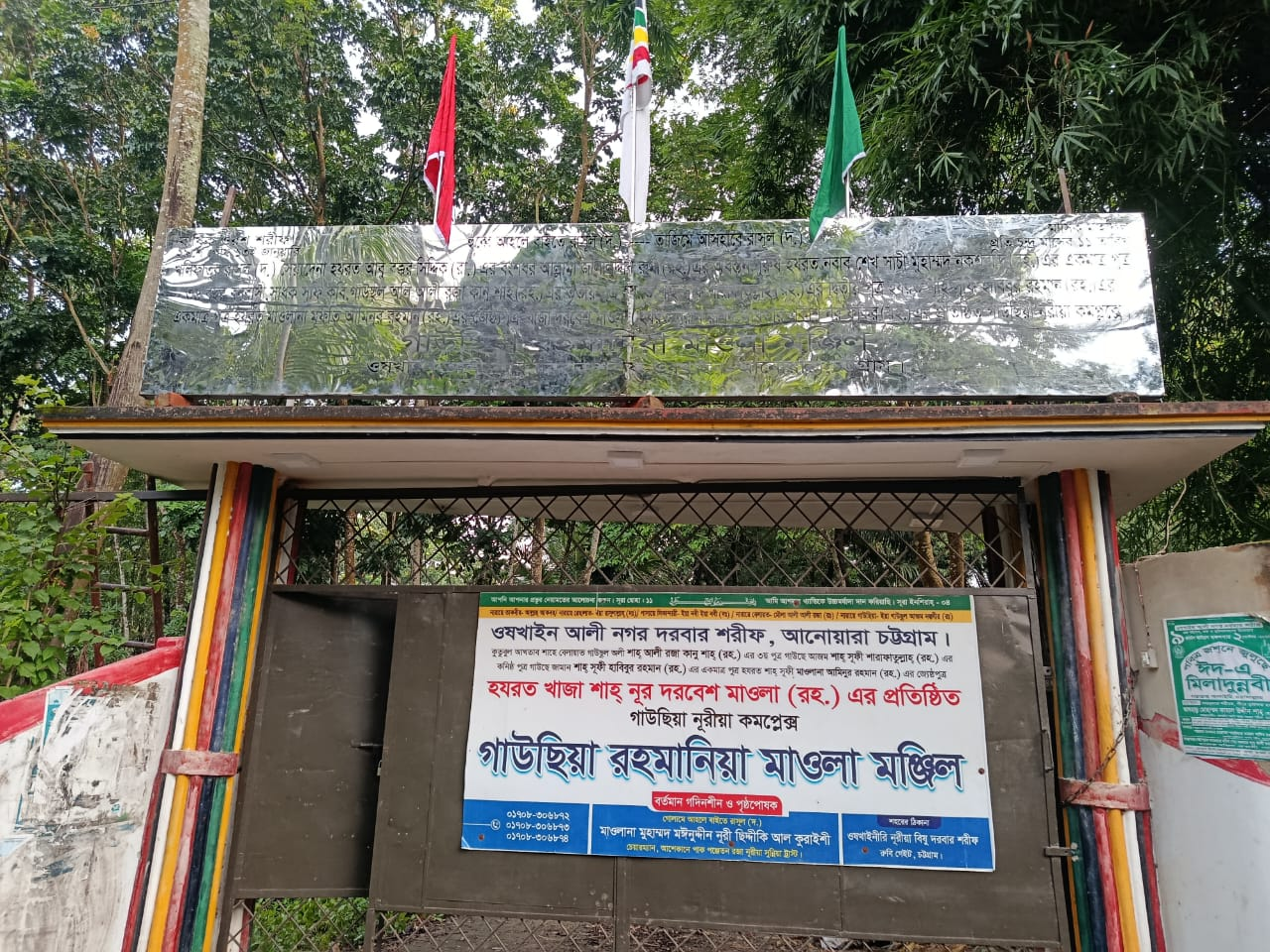
Gausia Rahmaniya Maula Manzil Enrrance Gate

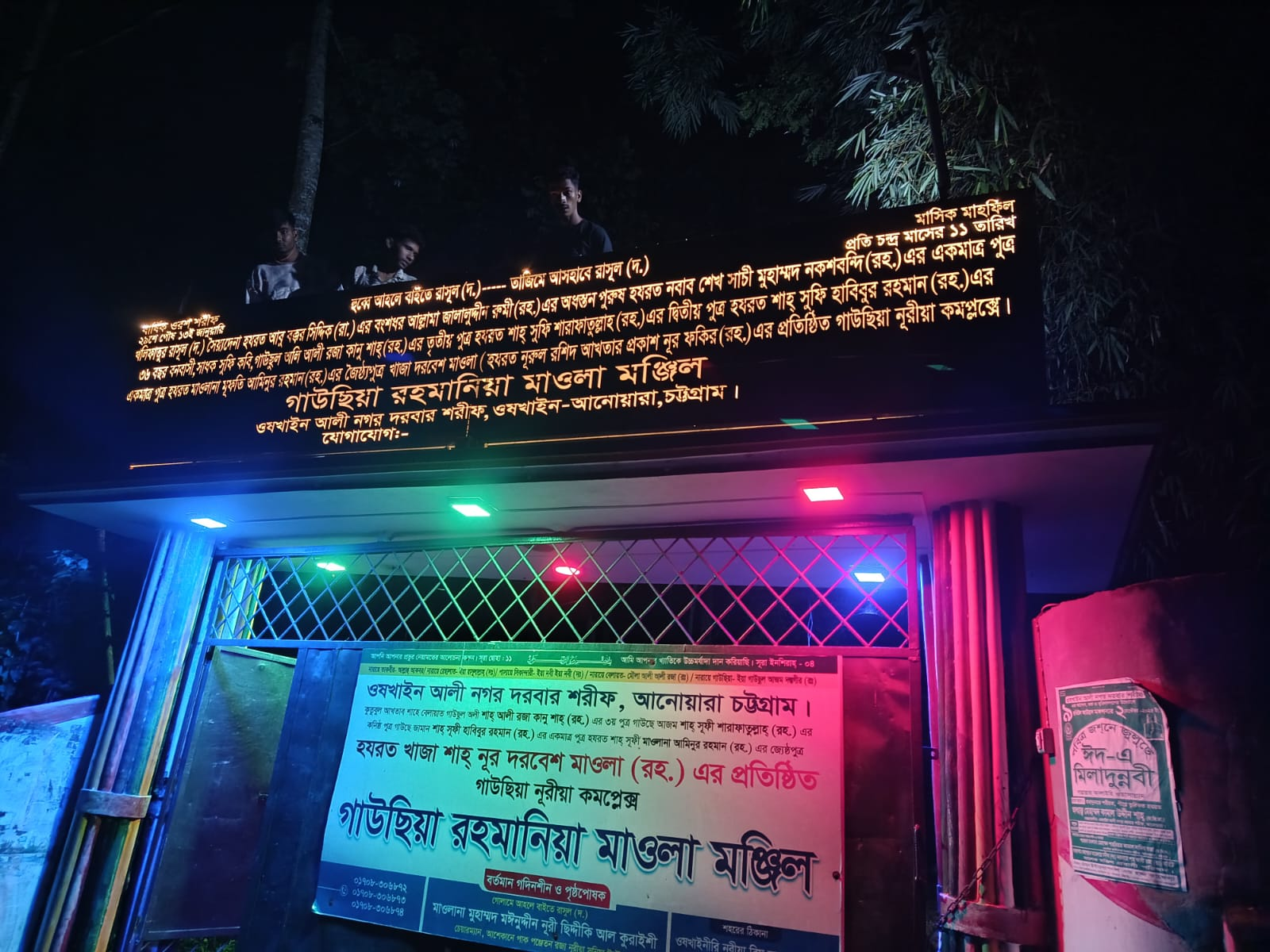
Gausia Rahmaniya Maula Manzil Enrrance Gate

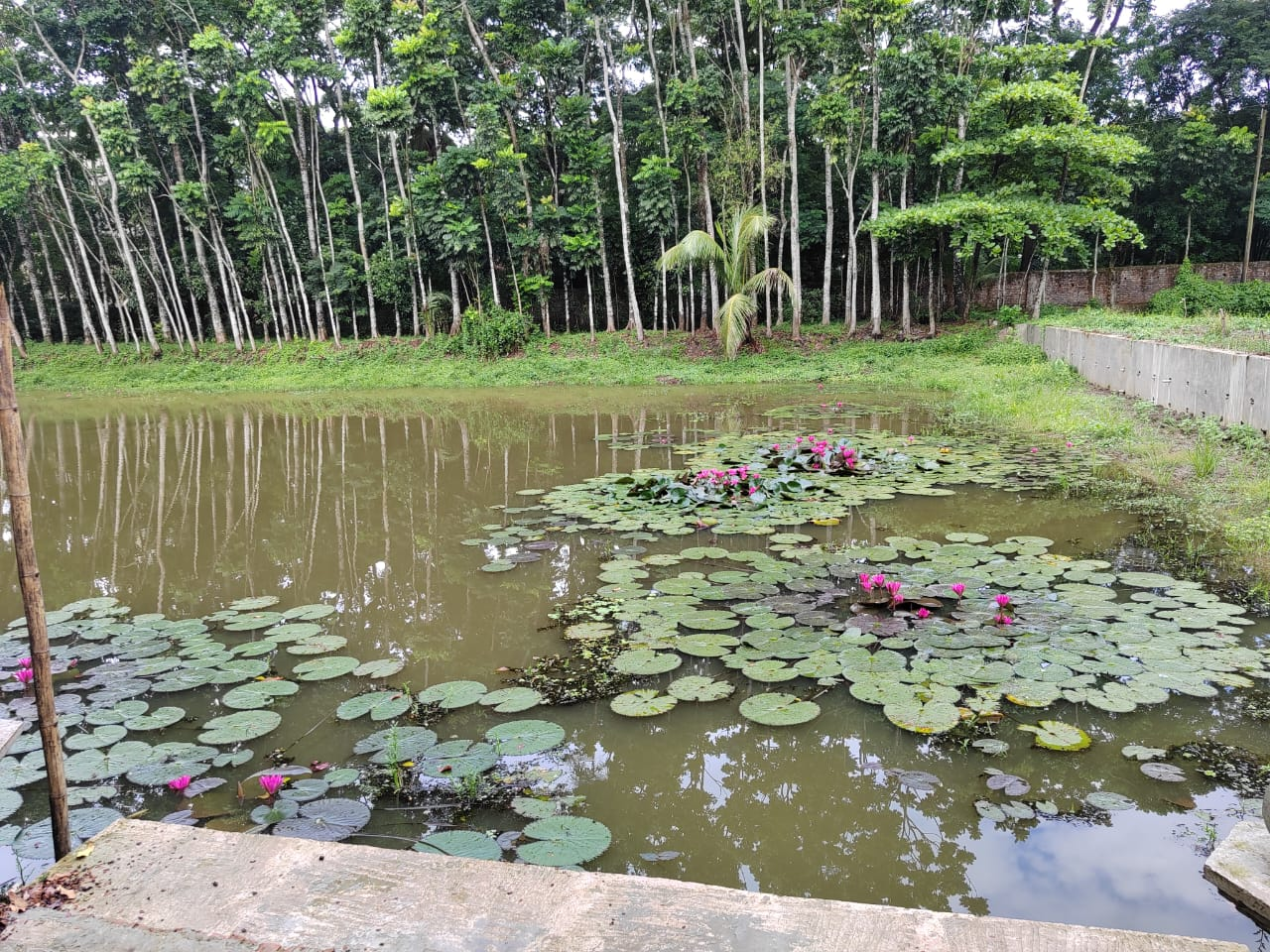
Buye Khawaja Dighi In Gausia Rahmania Maula Manzil

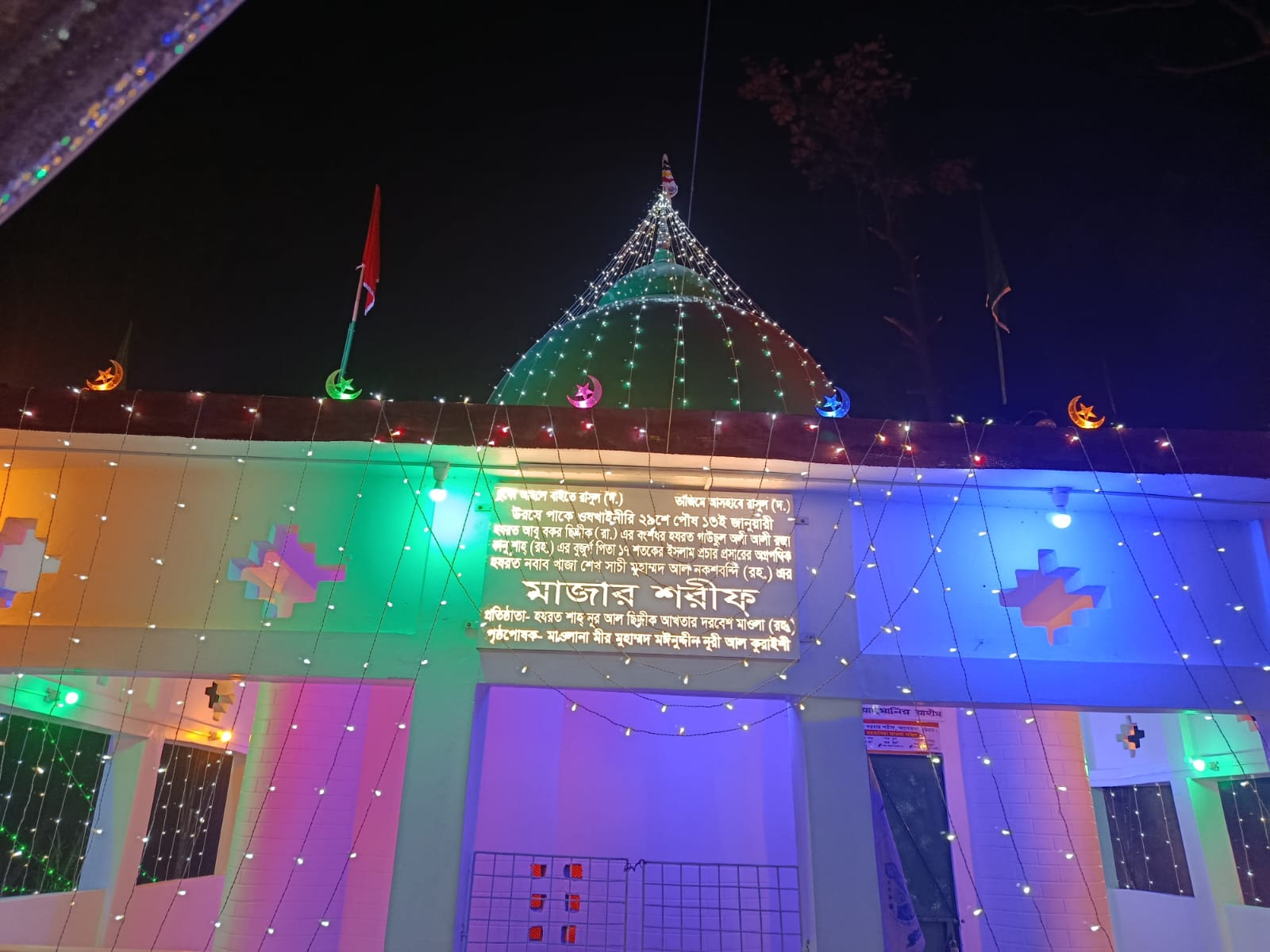
The Shrine of Sheikh Sachi Muhammad Naqsbandi at Gausia Rahmania Maula Manzil

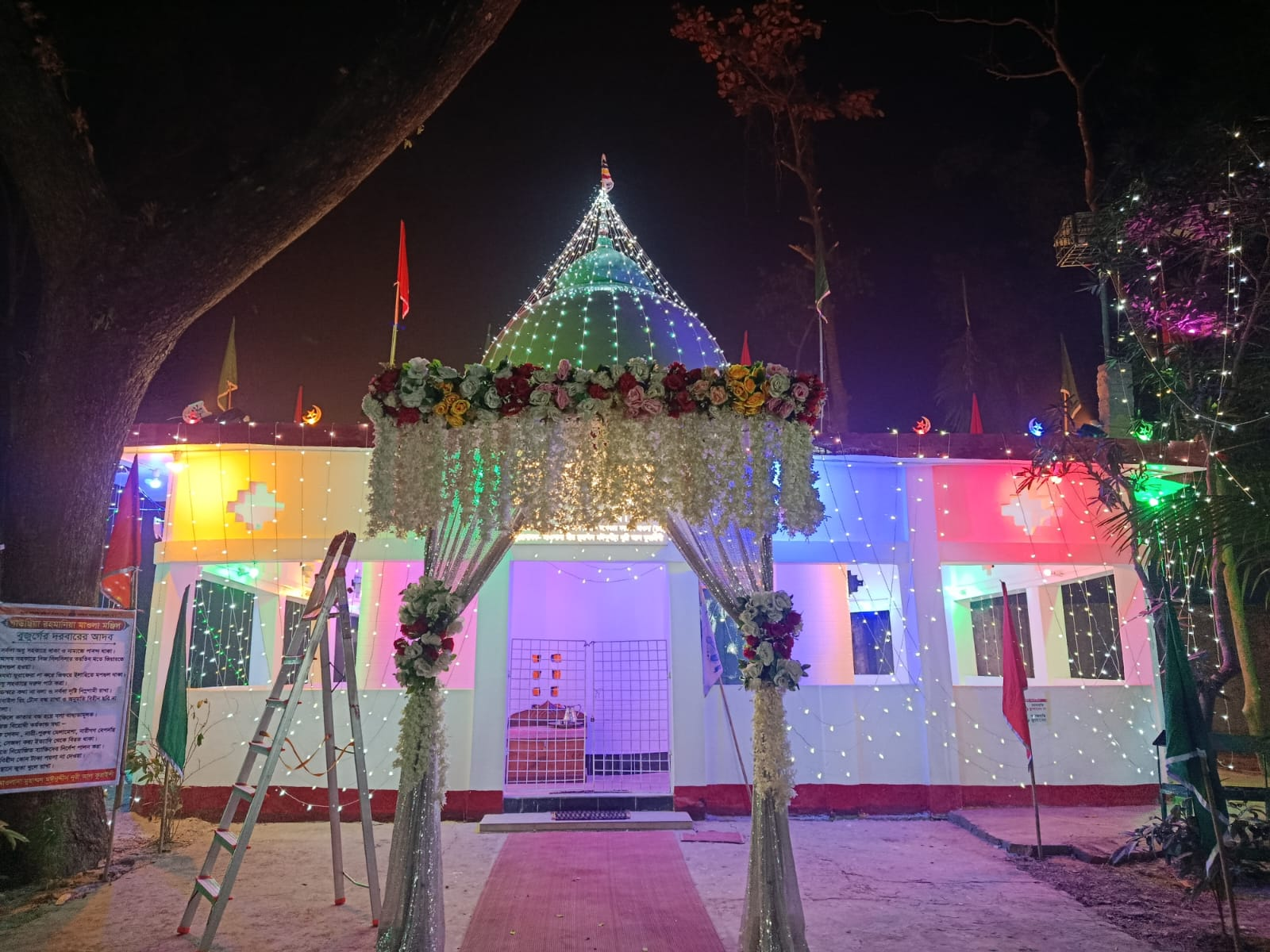
The entrance to the Shrine of Sheikh Sachi Muhammad Naqsbandi at Gausia Rahmania Maula Manzil

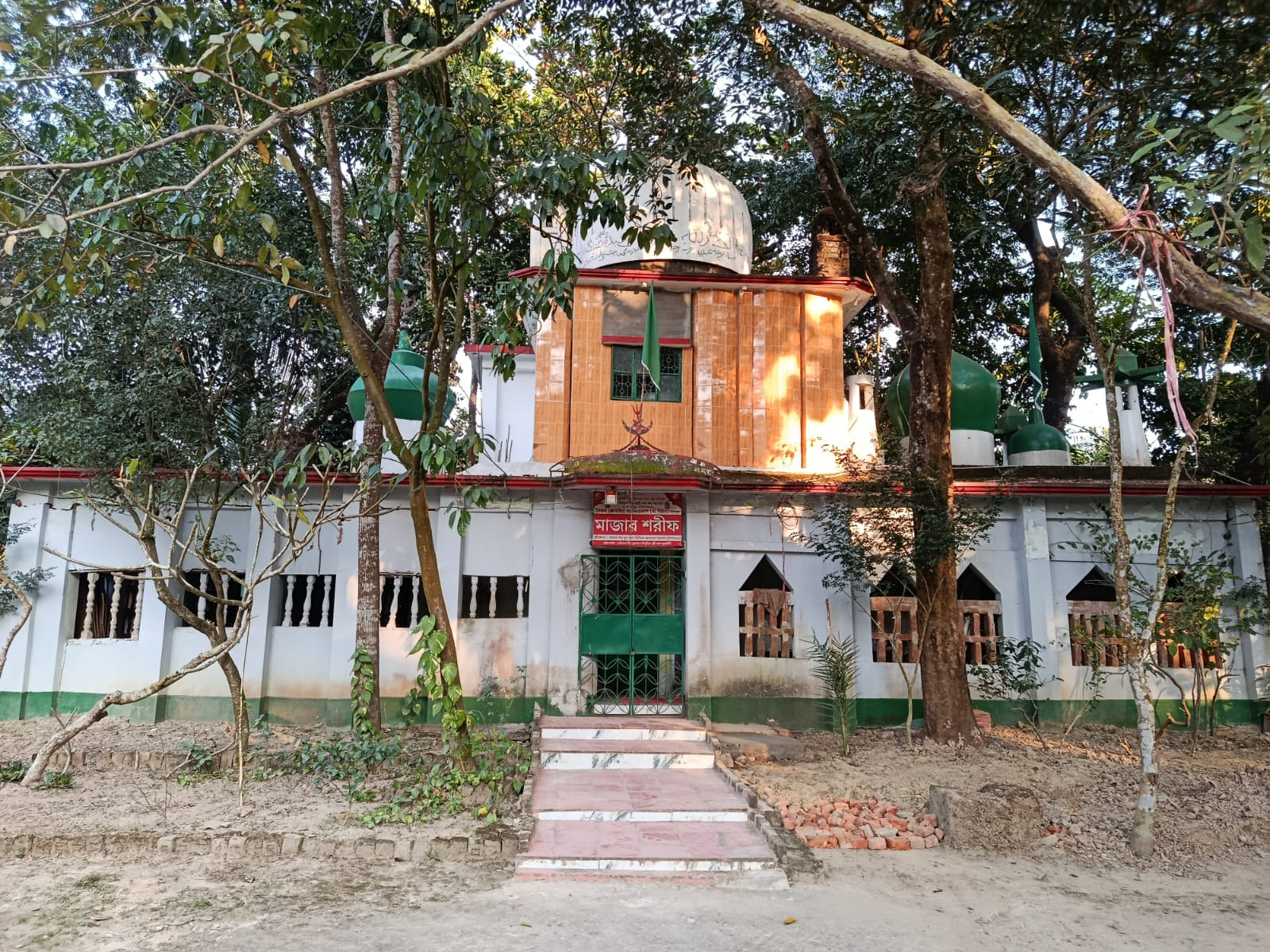
The 300-year-old traditional original Khanqah Sharif.

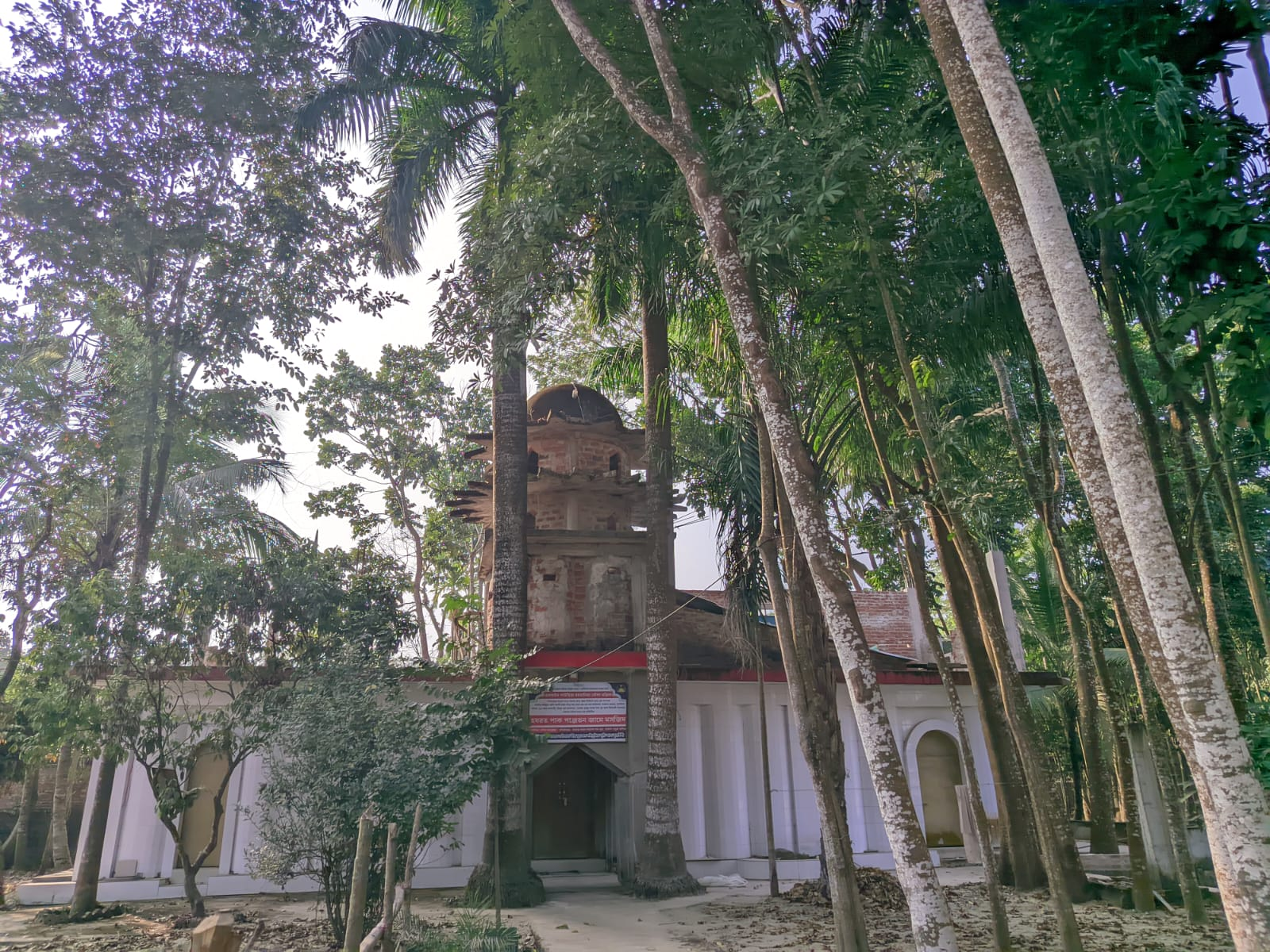
Pak Panjetan Nooriya Jame Mosque, located at Gausia Rahmaniya Moula Manzil.

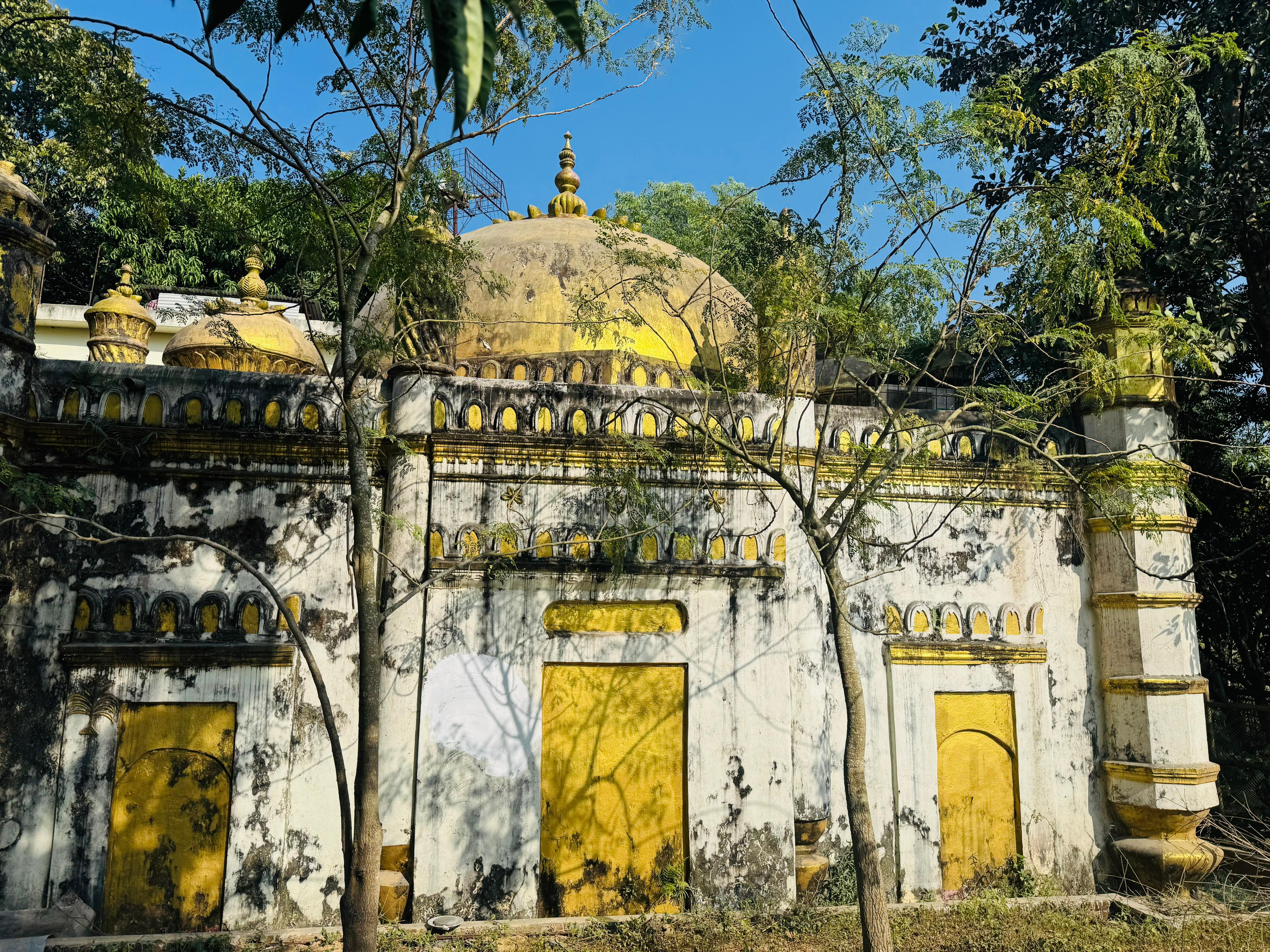
Sachi Jame Mosque, Cox's Bazar
