= Bairag Union =

Union of Anwara Upazila, Chittagong District, Bangladesh

Bairag Union বৈরাগ ইউনিয়ন
- Union
- Location in Bangladesh
- Coordinates: 22°14′N 91°51′E
- Country: Bangladesh
- Division: Chittagong Division
- District: Chittagong District
- Upazilas: Anwara Upazila

Government
  - Chairman: Vacant

Area
  - Total: 16.24 km^{2} (6.27 sq mi)

Population (2011)
  - Total: 30,545
- Time zone: UTC+6 (BST)
- Postal code: 4376
- Website: boiragup.chattogram.gov.bd

Bairag Union (Bengali: বৈরাগ ইউনিয়ন) is a union, the smallest administrative body of Bangladesh, located in Anwara Upazila, Chittagong District, Bangladesh. The total population is 30,545.

== Area ==
The area of Bairag Union is 4,013 acres (16.24 square kilometers).

== Demographics ==
According to the 2011 Bangladeshi census, Bairag Union had a population of 30,545, of which 15,759 were males and 14,786 were females. The total number of households was 5,662.

== Geography ==
Bairag Union is located in the north-western part of Anwara Upazila, approximately 7 kilometers from the upazila headquarters. It is bounded on the south by Barasat Union and Battali Union, on the east by Chatari Union, on the north by Bara Uthan Union of Karnaphuli Upazila, and on the west by the Karnaphuli River and Ward No. 41 (South Patenga) of Chattogram City Corporation.

== Administration ==
Bairag Union is the 1st Union Parishad under Anwara Upazila. The administrative activities of this union fall under the jurisdiction of Anwara Thana. It is part of Chittagong-13 (Constituency 290) of the National Parliament of Bangladesh. The villages of Bairag Union are:

Villages
No	Village
1	Bairag
2	Guapanchak
3	Badalpura
4	Majher Char
5	Rangadia
6	Bandar

== Education ==
According to the 2011 Bangladeshi census, Bairag Union had a literacy rate of 62.7%.

== Rivers and canals ==
The north-western part of Bairag Union is traversed by the Karnaphuli River.

== Markets ==
The main markets of Bairag Union are Chatori Choumuhni Bazar, Mahal Khan Bazar and Deyang Bazar.
