= Juidandi Union =

Union of Anwara Upazila, Chittagong District, Bangladesh

Juidandi Union জুঁইদণ্ডী ইউনিয়ন
- Union
- Location in Bangladesh
- Coordinates: 22°9′N 91°52′E
- Country: Bangladesh
- Division: Chittagong Division
- District: Chittagong District
- Upazilas: Anwara Upazila

Government
  - Chairman: Vacant

Area
  - Total: 8.67 km^{2} (3.35 sq mi)

Population (2011)
  - Total: 17,575
- Time zone: UTC+6 (BST)
- Website: juidandiup.chattogram.gov.bd

Juidandi Union (Bengali: জুঁইদণ্ডী ইউনিয়ন) is a union, the smallest administrative body of Bangladesh, located in Anwara Upazila, Chittagong District, Bangladesh. The total population is 17,575.

== Area ==
The area of Juidandi Union is 2,144 acres (8.67 square kilometers).

== Demographics ==
According to the 2011 Bangladeshi census, Juidandi Union had a population of 17,575, of which 8,495 were males and 9,080 were females. The total number of households was 3,291.

== Geography ==
Juidandi Union, surrounded by the Sangu River, is located at the southernmost part of Anwara Upazila, approximately 12 kilometres from the upazila headquarters. It is bounded on the north by Battali Union; on the east by Burumchhara Union, the Sangu River, Pukuria Union and Sadhanpur Union of Banshkhali Upazila; on the south by the Sangu River and Khankhanabad Union of Banshkhali Upazila; and on the west by Roypur Union, the Sangu River and Khankhanabad Union of Banshkhali Upazila.

== Administration ==
Juidandi Union is the 11th Union Parishad under Anwara Upazila. The administrative activities of the union fall under the jurisdiction of Anwara Thana. It is part of the Chittagong-13 (Constituency 290) of the National Parliament of Bangladesh.

== Education ==
According to the 2011 Bangladeshi census, Juidandi Union had a literacy rate of 50.6%.
