= Roypur Union =

Union of Anwara Upazila, Chittagong District, Bangladesh

Roypur Union রায়পুর ইউনিয়ন
- Union
- Location in Bangladesh
- Coordinates: 22°9.5′N 91°50.5′E
- Country: Bangladesh
- Division: Chittagong Division
- District: Chittagong District
- Upazilas: Anwara Upazila

Government
  - Chairman: Vacant

Area
  - Total: 23.15 km^{2} (8.94 sq mi)

Population (2011)
  - Total: 35,278
- Time zone: UTC+6 (BST)
- Postal code: 4376
- Website: raipurup.chattogram.gov.bd

Roypur Union (Bengali: রায়পুর ইউনিয়ন) is a union, the smallest administrative body of Bangladesh, located in Anwara Upazila, Chittagong District, Bangladesh. The total population is 35,278.

== Area ==
The area of Roypur Union is 5,721 acres (23.15 square kilometers).

== Demographics ==
According to the 2011 Bangladeshi census, Roypur Union had a population of 35,278, of which 17,461 were males and 17,817 were females. The total number of households was 6,389.

== Geography ==
Roypur Union is located on the westernmost side of Anwara Upazila, approximately 12 kilometres from the upazila headquarters, along the coast of the Bay of Bengal. It is bounded on the north by Barasat Union and Battali Union; on the east by Barasat Union, Battali Union, Juidandi Union, the Sangu River, and Khankhanabad Union of Banshkhali Upazila; on the south by the Sangu River and Khankhanabad Union of Banshkhali Upazila; and on the west by the Bay of Bengal.

== Administration ==
Roypur Union is the 3rd Union Parishad under Anwara Upazila. The administrative activities of this union fall under the jurisdiction of Anwara Thana. It is part of Chittagong-13 (Constituency 290) of the National Parliament of Bangladesh. The villages of Roypur Union are:

Villages
| No | Village |
|---|---|
| 1 | Uttar Puruapara |
| 2 | Dakshin Puruapara |
| 3 | Chunnapara |
| 4 | Raipur |
| 5 | Pashchim Raipur |
| 6 | Sorenga |
| 7 | Khorda Gahira |
| 8 | Madhya Gahira |
| 9 | Purba Gahira |
| 10 | Dakshin Gahira |

== Education ==
According to the 2011 Bangladeshi census, Roypur Union had a literacy rate of 33.5%.

== Rivers and Canals ==
The Sangu River flows along the southern and eastern sides of Roypur Union. On the western side lies the Bay of Bengal.

== Markets ==
The main markets in Roypur Union are Jaidya Hat, Wahed Ali Chowdhury Hat, Fakir Hat, and Dovashir Hat.
