= Battali Union, Anwara =

Union of Anwara Upazila, Chittagong District, Bangladesh

Battali Union বটতলী ইউনিয়ন
- Union
- Location in Bangladesh
- Coordinates: 22°11.8′N 91°52′E
- Country: Bangladesh
- Division: Chittagong Division
- District: Chittagong District
- Upazilas: Anwara Upazila

Area
  - Total: 11.87 km^{2} (4.58 sq mi)

Population (2011)
  - Total: 23,630
- Time zone: UTC+6 (BST)
- Postal code: 4378
- Website: battaliup.chattogram.gov.bd

Battali Union (Bengali: বটতলী ইউনিয়ন) is a union, the smallest administrative body of Bangladesh, located in Anwara Upazila, Chittagong District, Bangladesh. The total population is 23,630.

== Area ==
The area of Battali Union is 2,935 acres (11.87 square kilometers).

== Demographics ==
According to the 2011 Bangladeshi census, Battali Union had a population of 23,630, of which 11,576 were males and 12,054 were females. The total number of households was 4,659.

== Geography ==
Battali Union is located in the west-central part of Anwara Upazila in Chittagong District, Bangladesh, approximately 4.5 kilometres from the upazila headquarters. The union is bordered by Bairag Union to the north, Barasat Union to the west, Roypur Union and Juidandi Union to the south, and Burumchhara Union and Barakhain Union to the east.

== Administration ==
Battali Union is the 4th Union Parishad under Anwara Upazila. The administrative activities of the union fall under the jurisdiction of Anwara Thana. It is part of the Chittagong-13 (Constituency 290) of the National Parliament of Bangladesh. The villages of Battali Union are:

Villages
| No | Village |
|---|---|
| 1 | Airmongol |
| 2 | Battali |
| 3 | Chapatoly |
| 4 | West Baraiya |
| 5 | East Baraiya |
| 6 | East Tulatuly |

== Education ==
According to the 2011 Bangladeshi census, Battali Union had a literacy rate of 44.8%.
