= Chatari Union =

Union of Anwara Upazila, Chittagong District, Bangladesh

Chatari Union চাতরী ইউনিয়ন
- Union
- Location in Bangladesh
- Coordinates: 22°14′N 91°53′E
- Country: Bangladesh
- Division: Chittagong Division
- District: Chittagong District
- Upazilas: Anwara Upazila

Government
  - Chairman: Vacant

Area
  - Total: 13.21 km^{2} (5.10 sq mi)

Population (2011)
  - Total: 19,022
- Time zone: UTC+6 (BST)
- Website: chatariup.chattogram.gov.bd

Chatari Union (Bengali: চাতরী ইউনিয়ন) is a union, the smallest administrative body of Bangladesh, located in Anwara Upazila, Chittagong District, Bangladesh. The total population is 19,022.

== Area ==
The area of Chatari Union is 3,265 acres (13.21 square kilometers).

== Demographics ==
According to the 2011 Bangladeshi census, Chatari Union had a population of 19,022, of which 9,384 were males and 9,638 were females. The total number of households was 3,708.

== Geography ==
Chatari Union is located in the northernmost part of Anwara Upazila, approximately 4 kilometres from the upazila headquarters. It is bounded on the south by Barakhain Union and Anwara Union; on the east by Anwara Union, Haildhar Union, Paraikora Union and Kasiais Union of Patiya Upazila; on the north by Paraikora Union, Jiri Union of Patiya Upazila and Bara Uthan Union of Karnaphuli Upazila; and on the west by Bairag Union and Boro Uthan Union of Karnaphuli Upazila.

== Administration ==
Chatari Union is the 8th Union Parishad under Anwara Upazila. The administrative activities of the union fall under the jurisdiction of Anwara Thana. It is part of the Chittagong-13 (Constituency 290) of the National Parliament of Bangladesh. The villages of Chatari Union are:

Villages
No	Village
1	Belchura
2	Chatari
3	Dumuria
4	Kainpura
5	Keyagor
6	Paschim Kanyara
7	Rudura
8	Singhra

== Education ==
According to the 2011 Bangladeshi census, Chatari Union had a literacy rate of 63.2%.

== Rivers and Canals ==
The Boalgaon Canal flows through Chatari Union.

== Markets ==
The main market of Chatari Union is Chatari Chomohoni Bazar.
