= Barakhain Union =

Union of Anwara Upazila, Chittagong District, Bangladesh

Barakhain Union বারখাইন ইউনিয়ন
- Union
- Location in Bangladesh
- Coordinates: 22°11′N 91°55′E
- Country: Bangladesh
- Division: Chittagong Division
- District: Chittagong District
- Upazilas: Anwara Upazila

Area
  - Total: 17.71 km^{2} (6.84 sq mi)

Population (2011)
  - Total: 28,836
- Time zone: UTC+6 (BST)
- Postal code: 4376
- Website: baroakhanup.chittagong.gov.bd

Barakhain Union (Bengali: বারখাইন ইউনিয়ন) is a union, the smallest administrative body of Bangladesh, located in Anwara Upazila, Chittagong District, Bangladesh. The total population is 28,836.

== Area ==
The area of Barakhain Union is 4,378 acres (17.71 square kilometers).

== Demographics ==
According to the 2011 Bangladeshi census, Barakhain Union had a population of 28,836, of which 13,746 were males and 15,090 were females. The total number of households was 5,679.

== Geography ==
Barakhain Union is located in the south-central part of Anwara Upazila, approximately 3.5 kilometres from the upazila headquarters. It is bounded on the west by Burumchhara Union and Battali Union, on the north by Chatari Union and Anwara Union, on the east by Anwara Union, Haildhar Union, and Pukuria Union of Banshkhali Upazila, and on the south by Haildhar Union and Burumchhara Union.

== Administration ==
Barakhain Union is the 6th Union Parishad under Anwara Upazila. The administrative activities of the union fall under the jurisdiction of Anwara Thana. It is part of the Chittagong-13 (Constituency 290) of the National Parliament of Bangladesh. The villages of Barakhain Union are:

Villages
No	Village
1	Wahedpur
2	Narayanpur
3	Abdullahpur
4	Jinnotpur
5	Ramnagar
6	Noakandi
7	Putiapara
8	Rajapur
9	Subil
10	Raghabpur
11	Shibnagar
12	Kanibil
13	Tanchara
14	Burirpar
15	Saidpur
16	Hadipur
17	Machuabad
18	Khalpar
19	West Pumkara

== Education ==
According to the 2011 Bangladeshi census, Barakhain Union had a literacy rate of 54.5%.
