= Parki Beach =

Beach in Bangladesh

Coordinates: 22.1928°N 91.8151°E

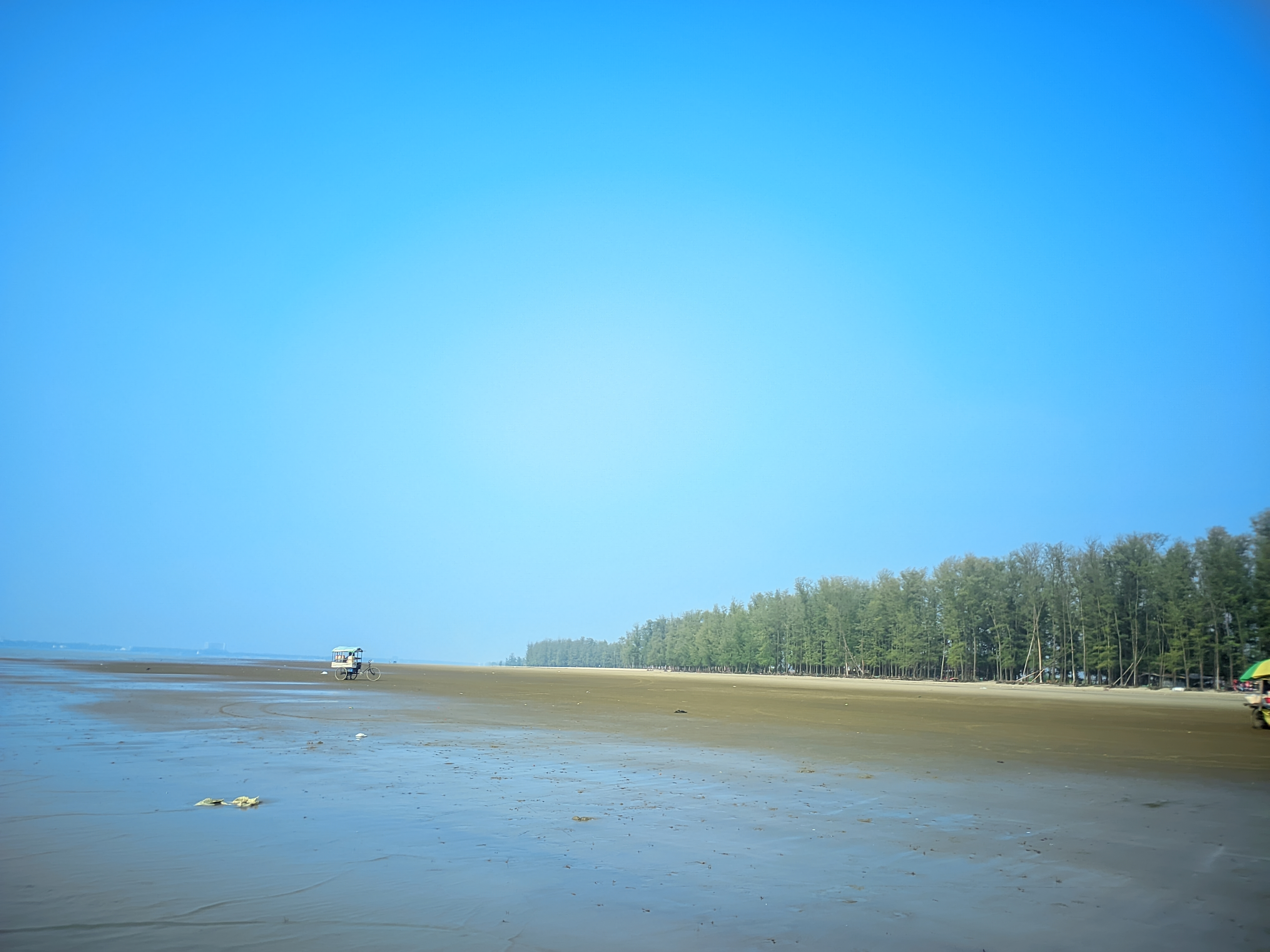

Parki Beach (Bengali: পারকি সৈকত) is a sandy beach in Bangladesh. This beach is between a river and delta in Anwara of Chittagong. It is 20-kilometre (12 mi) from the city of Chittagong. This beach is situated near the Karnaphuli River.

== History ==
The MV Crystal Gold was beached at Parki Beach when Cyclone Mora came in May 2017. In 2019 the Directorate of Environment recommended that the ship be scrapped. This was opposed by Bangladesh Poribesh Andolon, an environmentalist organisation, who feared environmental damage from scrapping the ship. The ship was owned by Crystal Group who sold it to Four Star Corporation. Four Star Corporation tried to dismantle the ship in 2018 but was stopped by the Department of Environment for failing to secure an environmental clearance.

Barasat Union Parishad has been trying to establish the beach as a tourism spot since 2013. The beach is 17 kilometres (11 mi) from Chittagong. In August 2020, the beach was closed due to the COVID-19 pandemic in Bangladesh and around 2000 jobs in the tourism industry were lost.

== Gallery ==
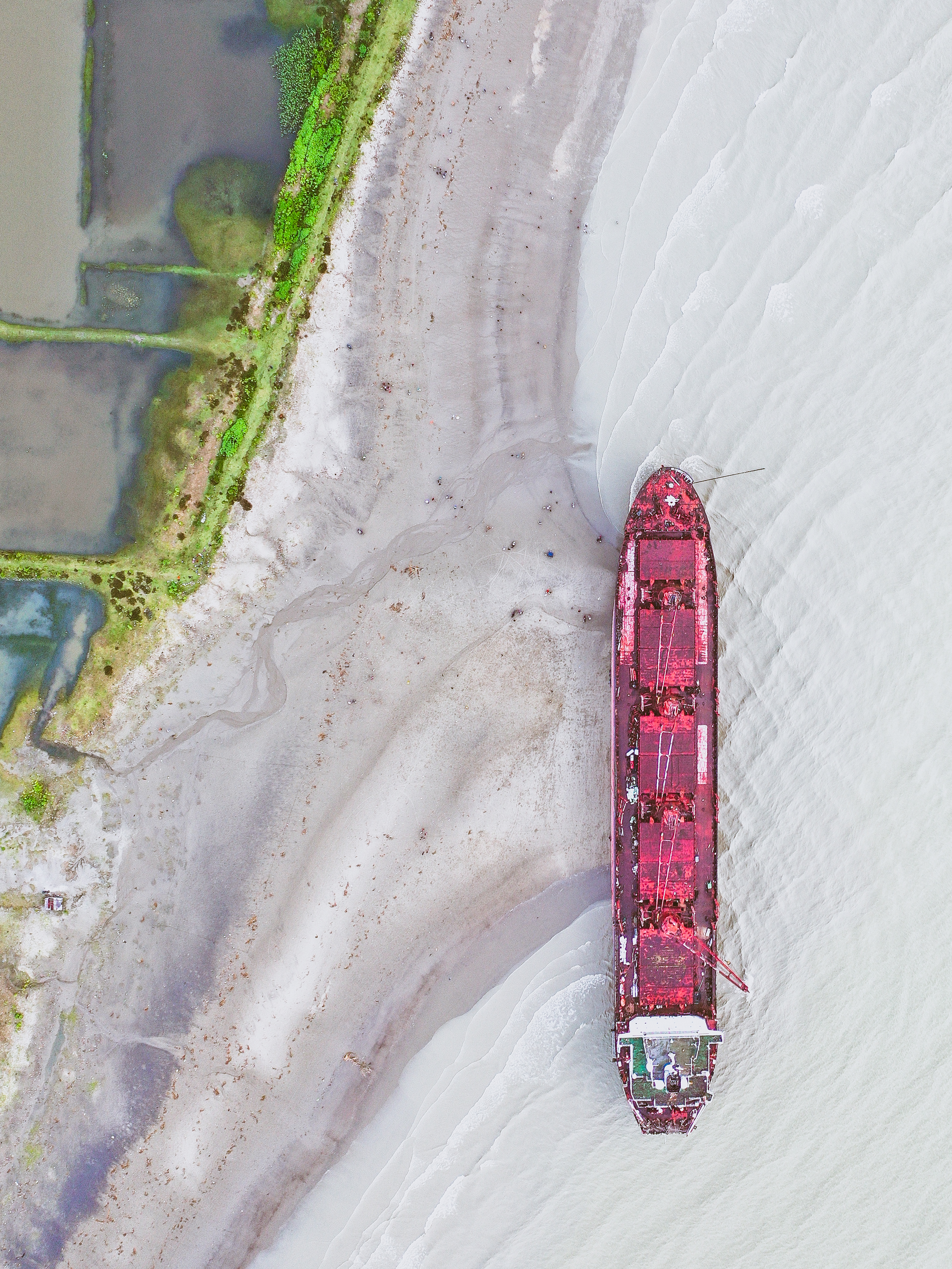
MV Crystal Gold at Parki Beach

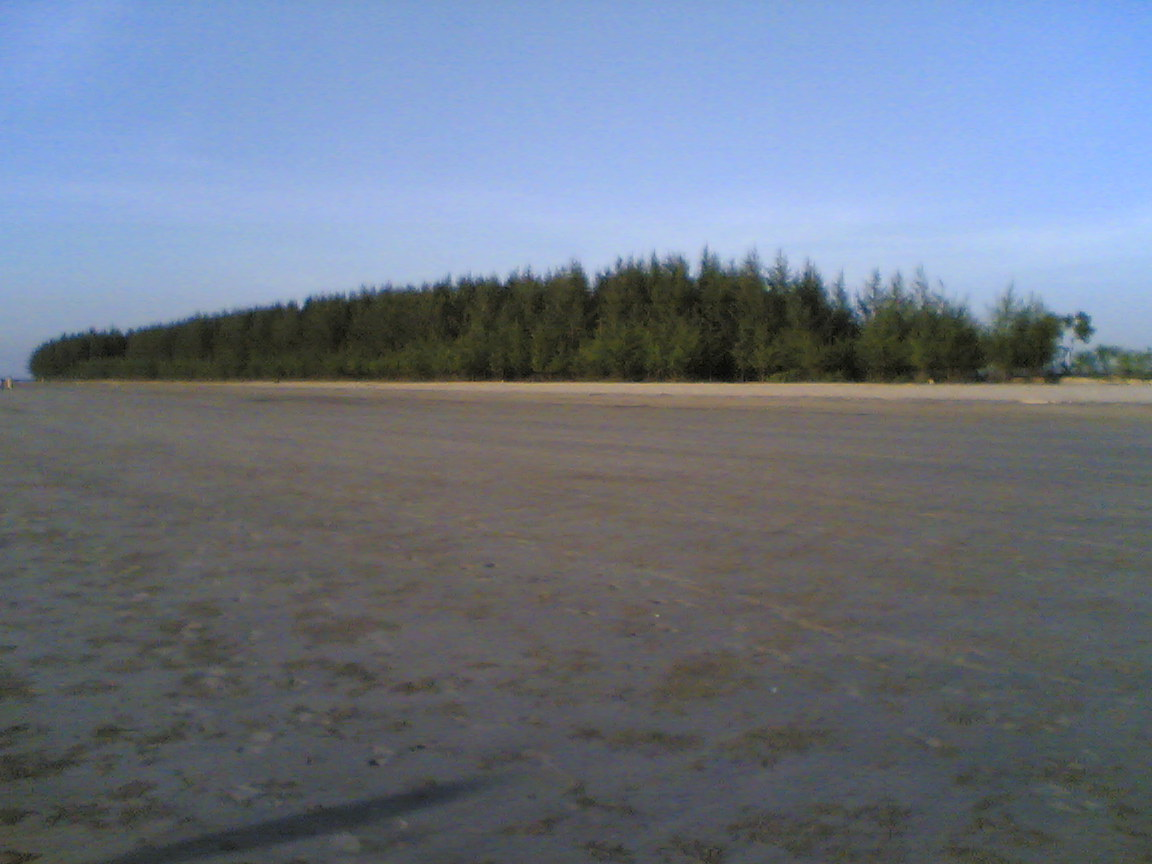
Beach Area

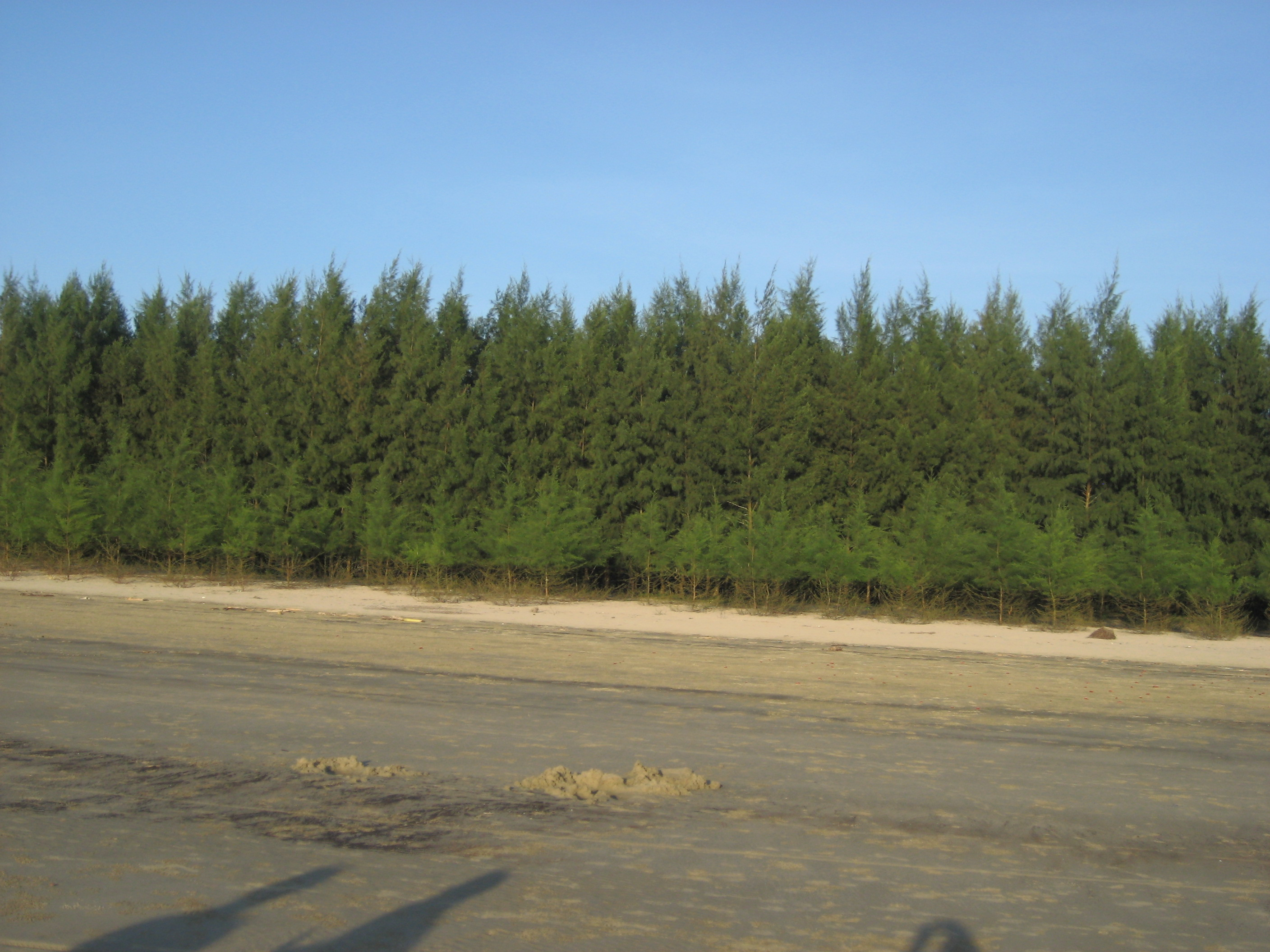
Trees in Parki Beach

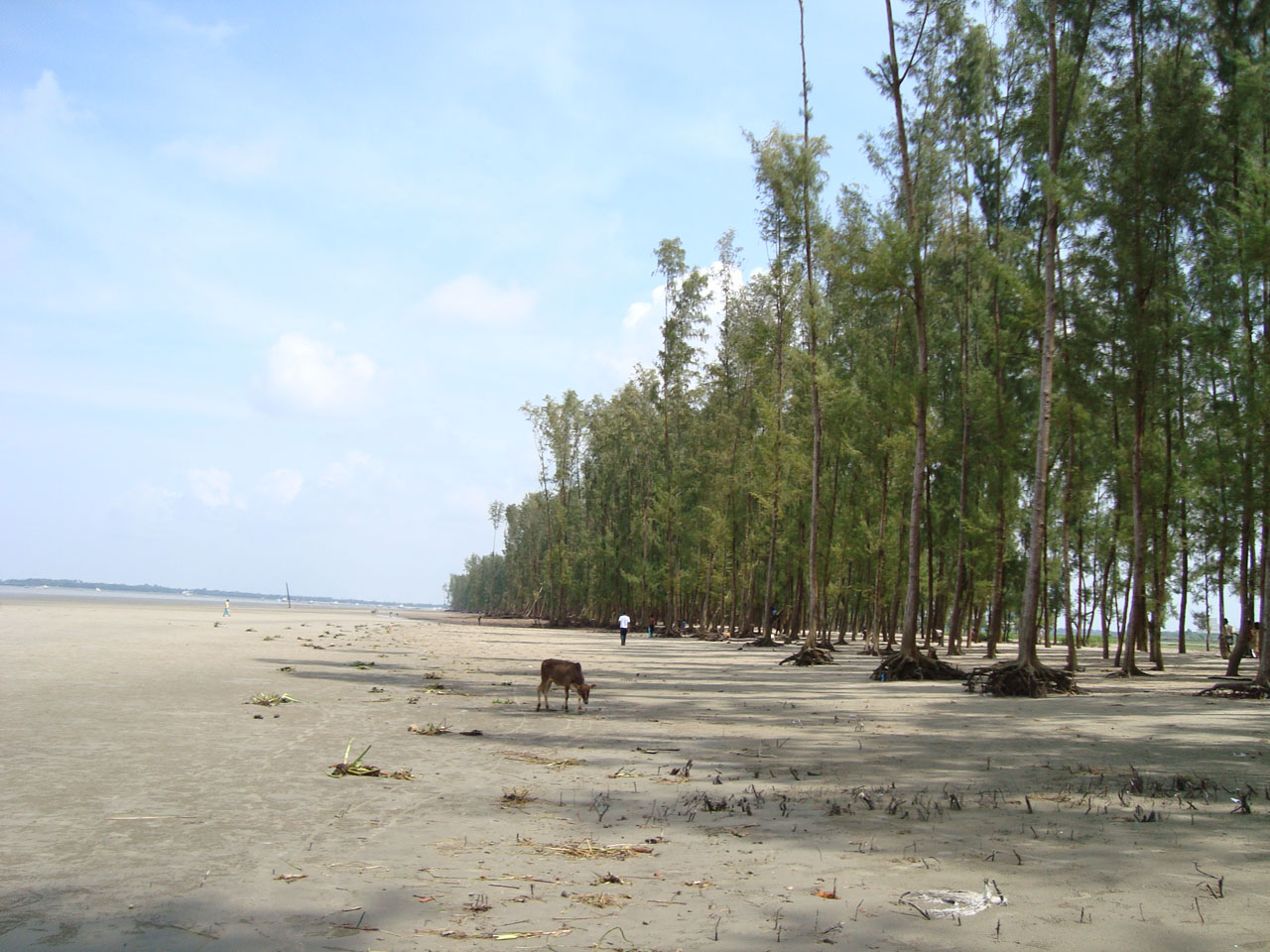
Parki Beach
