= Sangu Wildlife Sanctuary =

Wildlife sanctuary in Bangladesh

Sangu-Matamuhari
- IUCN category II (national park)
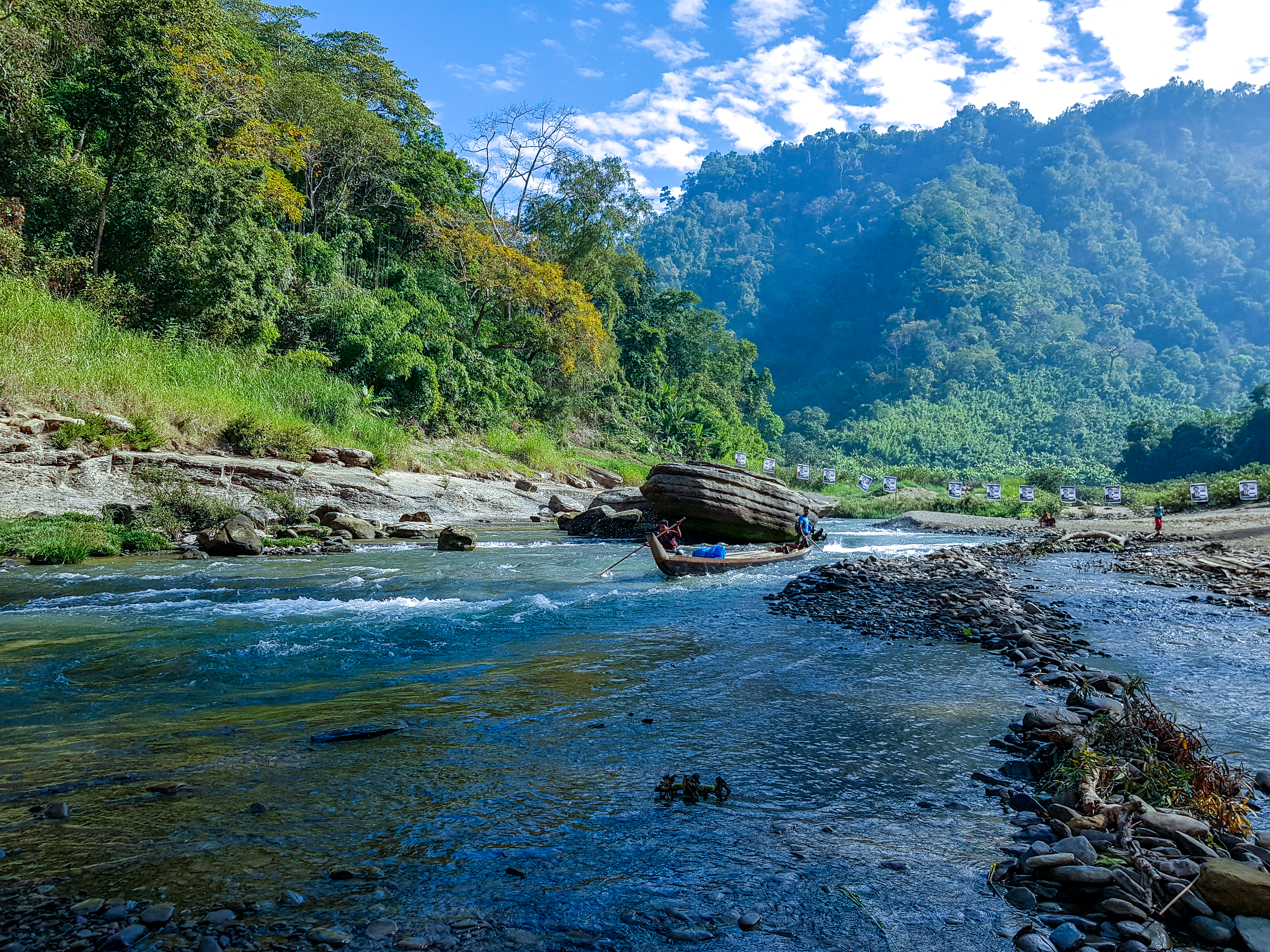
- Forest by the river sangu

- Location within Bangladesh
- Location: Bandarban District, Chittagong Division, Bangladesh
- Coordinates: 21°41′22″N 92°10′01″E
- Area: 23.32 km^{2} (9.00 sq mi)
- Established: 2010
- Governing body: Bangladesh Forest Department

Sangu-Matamuhari or Sangu Wildlife Sanctuary is a wildlife sanctuary—IUCN category II (habitat/species management area)—situated in Bandarban District, Chittagong Division, Bangladesh. It is part of the Sangu reserve forest. It is under the Lama Forest Division of the Bangladesh Forest Department. Its bio-ecological zone is in Chittagong Hills and Chittagong Hill Tracts.

It houses Bangladesh's richest wildlife resource after Sunderbans. It is famous for its remoteness and for its rich array of wildlife, including Asian elephants, gaurs, sambar deer, barking deer, serows, Asian black bears, sun bears, leopards, clouded leopards, Asian golden cats, marbled cats, leopard cats, binturongs, western hoolock gibbons, slow lorises, crab-eating macaques, capped langurs, reticulated pythons, Arakan forest turtles, Asian giant tortoises, great hornbills and spotted owlets. There have also been uncertain reports of vagrant tigers in the forest reserve by local indigenous people.

It is a very remote and densely forested reserve. Thus the area remains largely undeveloped.

== Basic information ==
It was established in 2010; its total area is 2,332 hectares (5,760 acres). It is under the Lama Forest Division of Bandarban. It is under the Sangu Forest Range. It is beside the Sangu River. Its physiography is categorized as Northern and Eastern Hills; its beat information is 285 Sangu Mouza. Visitors enter this wildlife sanctuary mostly for nature trails, picnic sites, etc. It has only one forest range office. It is a protected area under the wildlife act of 1974.

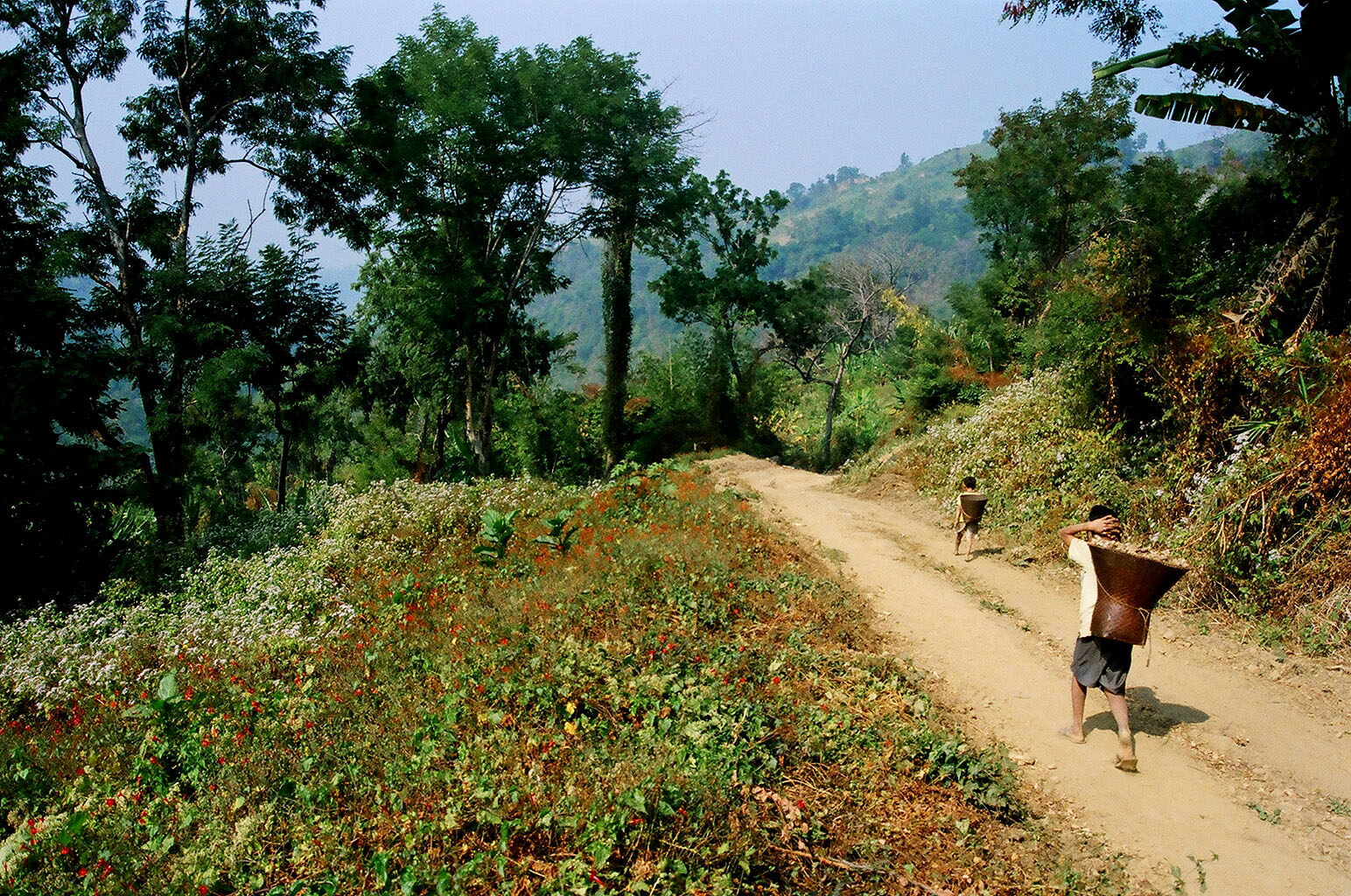
Indigenous people walking through forest tracks

There are some Rohingya refugees in the area. Also, ethnic indigenous Mro people live around the forest area. It is situated in one of the most isolated parts of Bangladesh. Thus, it is not highly developed. It does not have correct boundary demarcations yet. There are some toilets and shops of local ethnic people in the sanctuary.

== Socio-economic context and threat assessment ==
The Wildlife Sanctuary does not provide any employment opportunity to the local people. The transport system is underdeveloped because of its remoteness. However, there are some private organization-conducted shops. Local ethnic people run the shops. 1200–1300 people depend on the wildlife sanctuary for resources like fuel wood, sun grass, bamboo, medicinal plant and others. There are some Rohingya refugee settlements around the forest.

Severe encroachment leading to expansion of settlements and agriculture, tree poaching, hunting, shooting, collection of fuel wood, bamboo and cane and other forest products are the major causes for the exploitation of resources of the national park. On the other hand, functioning sawmills in the vicinity and unemployment are the major underlying factors for the marked dependency of the local communities upon the park. Less stringent monitoring and a negative influence of some locally powerful individuals have further exacerbated the sustainable maintenance of the sanctuary.

== Ecological context and flora diversity ==
Sangu Matamuhari/ Sangu wildlife sanctuary is situated in Chittagong Hill Tracts area. The Chittagong Hill Tracts have been broadly classified as the tropical evergreen or semi-evergreen types, which, according to a source, supply around 40% of the commercial timber. The flora of the Chittagong Hill Tracts is distinctive in character and resembles the flora of Arakan. However, the teak patches that we see throughout the hill area are planted forests, not indigenous to the area.

=== Sangu River ===
Sangu River originates in the Arakan Hills of Myanmar and enters Bangladesh near Remarki (Thanchi upazila of Bandarban district). It flows north through Thanchi, Rowangchhari and Bandarban upazilas of Bandarban district. Then it flows west through Satkania and Banshkhali upazilas of Chittagong district to meet the Bay of Bengal near Khankhanabad (Chittagong). The length of the river is 295 km. The major tributaries of the river are Chandkhali Nadi and Dolu khal. There are 7 BWDB hydrometric stations on this river and data are available from 1965. Sangu River has its source at 21°13´N and 92°37´E in the North Arakan Hills.

=== Flora ===
The wildlife sanctuary was once covered with multi-storied evergreen forest. However, due to refugee settlements, the vegetation of these areas has diminished. Despite this, the sanctuary remains rich in natural resources, and possesses a remarkable diversity of flora.

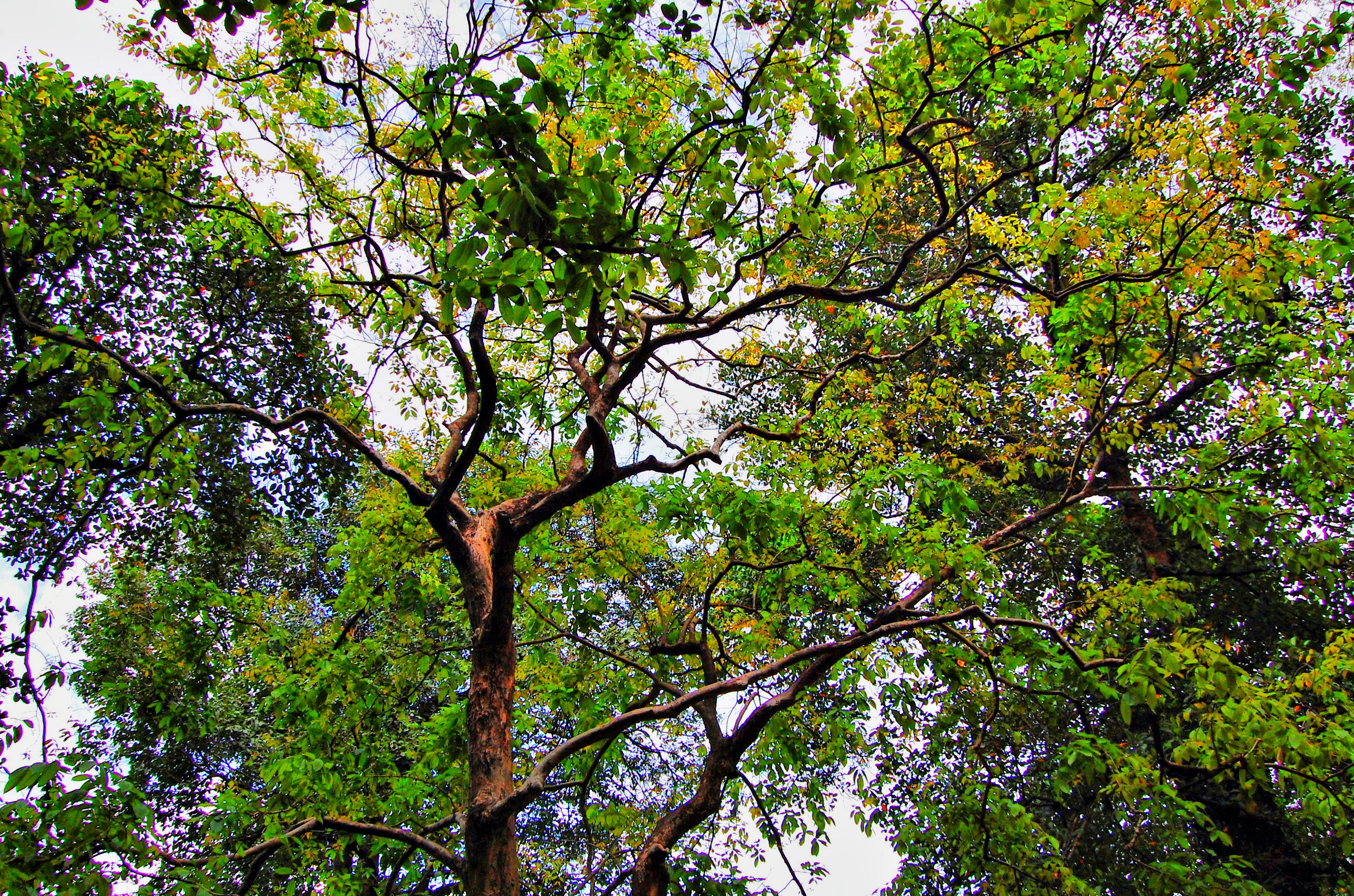
Jarul trees Lagerstroemia speciosa

The most important commercial timber species of the Sangu Matamuhari is Jarul, Gamar, Garjan, Chapalish, Toon, Koroi, Civit, Champa, Simul, Chandul, etc. that used to grow to gigantic proportions. Most of the trees are of the evergreen type, whereas most of the tallest trees are deciduous and semi-deciduous. Some of the trees shed their leaves during the cold season and some in the summer, so the forest always looks green or, more correctly, the forest never loses its semi-evergreen appearance. However, this is a description of the forests of which remains roughly 70% of the area. As some portion of the forest reserves are well degraded than the past.

== Wildlife diversity ==
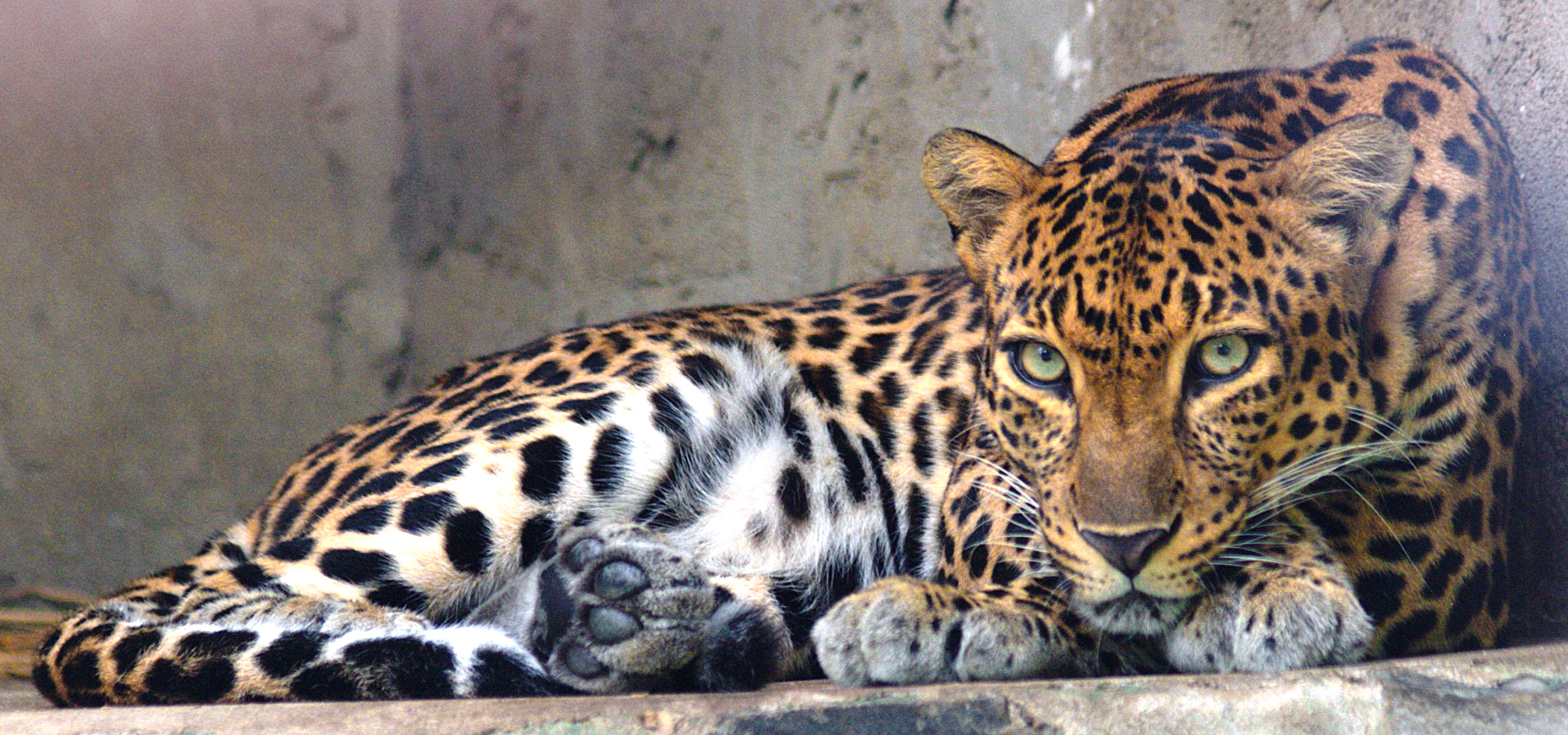
Indochinese leopard

The Indochinese leopard is very rare. However what might be leopard pugmarks are occasionally found. Also there was a picture of a leopard, taken by a camera trap, close to Sangu Wildlife Sanctuary in 2015. Here also lives Indian Leopard too.

The wildlife sanctuary was once covered with luxuriant multi-storied evergreen forest. Asian elephant herds used to roam in and around the sanctuary. However, due to settlement of refuge, the vegetation of these areas diminished and became uninhabitable for elephants, which now can be seen in Sangu Mouza only. Asian black bear is the most common bear species in the area but still low numbered. A second bear species of the area is the sun bear Another large mammal, the sambar deer, are also reported in low numbers. Endangered species great hornbill are still seen flying in the sanctuary. There are some spotted owlets as well. There are reports of tigers in the mixed evergreen hill tract valleys of Sangu-Matamuhuri, which are contiguous with forests in India and Myanmar respectively. Both of these sites are within an area classified as a Tiger Restoration Landscape, contiguous with the Northern Forest Complex-Namdapha-Royal Manas Global Priority Tiger Conservation Landscape (TCL).

== Nisharga Shahayata Prakalpa ==
Beside the National Forest Department, an NGO named "Nisharga", with their "Nisharga Shahayata Prakalpa", observes the park. Beside the preserving forest they provide eco-tours. Its forest type is mixed evergreen forest. In 2009 IPAC (Integrated Protected Area Co-management) project started its activities in this protected area.

== See also ==
- List of protected areas of Bangladesh
- Rema-Kalenga Wildlife Sanctuary
- Wildlife sanctuary
