= Anwara Union =

Union of Anwara Upazila, Chittagong District, Bangladesh

Anwara Union আনোয়ারা ইউনিয়ন
- Union
- Location in Bangladesh
- Coordinates: 22°13′N 91°54′E
- Country: Bangladesh
- Division: Chittagong Division
- District: Chittagong District
- Upazilas: Anwara Upazila

Government
  - Chairman: Vacant

Area
  - Total: 7.57 km^{2} (2.92 sq mi)

Population (2011)
  - Total: 10,260
- Time zone: UTC+6 (BST)
- Postal code: 4376
- Website: anwaraup.chittagong.gov.bd

Anwara Union (Bengali: আনোয়ারা ইউনিয়ন) is a union, the smallest administrative body of Bangladesh, located in Anwara Upazila, Chittagong District, Bangladesh. The total population is 10,260.

== Area ==
The area of Anwara Union is 1,871 acres (7.57 square kilometers).

== Demographics ==
According to the 2011 Bangladeshi census, Anwara Union had a population of 10,260, of which 5,114 were males and 5,146 were females. The total number of households was 2,171.

Religions in Anwara Union (2022)
Religion	Percent
Hinduism	60.48%
Islam	39.15%
Other or not stated	0.37%

== Geography ==
Anwara Union is located in the central part of Anwara Upazila, with the administrative headquarters of the upazila situated within this union. It is bounded on the east by Haildhar Union, on the north by Chatari Union, on the west by Chatari Union and Barakhain Union, and on the south by Barakhain Union.

== Administration ==
Anwara Union is the 7th Union Parishad under Anwara Upazila. The administrative activities of the union fall under the jurisdiction of Anwara Thana. It is part of the Chittagong-13 (Constituency 290) of the National Parliament of Bangladesh. The villages of Anwara Union are:

Villages
No	Village
1	Khilpara
2	Boalgao
3	Dhanpura
4	Anwara
5	Bilpura

== Education ==
According to the 2011 Bangladeshi census, Anwara Union had a literacy rate of 69%.

== Canals and rivers ==
The Ichamati Canal flows through Anwara Union.

== Markets ==
The main market of Anwara Union is Anwara Joykali Bazar.
