= Paraikora Union =

Union of Anwara Upazila, Chittagong District, Bangladesh

Paraikora Union পরৈকোড়া ইউনিয়ন
- Union
- Location in Bangladesh
- Coordinates: 22°14′N 91°56′E
- Country: Bangladesh
- Division: Chittagong Division
- District: Chittagong District
- Upazilas: Anwara Upazila

Area
  - Total: 15.92 km^{2} (6.15 sq mi)

Population (2011)
  - Total: 19,635
- Time zone: UTC+6 (BST)
- Postal code: 4377
- Website: paraikoraup.chattogram.gov.bd

Paraikora Union (Bengali: পরৈকোড়া ইউনিয়ন) is a union, the smallest administrative body of Bangladesh, located in Anwara Upazila, Chittagong District, Bangladesh. The total population is 19,635.

== Area ==
The area of Paraikora Union is 3,935 acres (15.92 square kilometers).

== Demographics ==
According to the 2011 Bangladeshi census, Paraikora Union had a population of 19,635, of which 9,488 were males and 10,147 were females. The total number of households was 4,055.

== Geography ==
Paraikora Union is located at the easternmost part of Anwara Upazila, approximately 6 kilometres from the upazila headquarters. It is bounded on the south by Haildhar Union and Chatari Union; on the west by Chatari Union; on the north by Kasiais Union and Asia Union of Patiya Upazila; and on the east by Asia Union, Chanhara Union and Sobhandandi Union of Patiya Upazila, as well as Barkal Union of Chandanaish Upazila.

== Administration ==
Paraikora Union is the 9th Union Parishad under Anwara Upazila. The administrative activities of the union fall under the jurisdiction of Anwara Thana. It is part of the Chittagong-13 (Constituency 290) of the National Parliament of Bangladesh. The villages of Paraikora Union are:

Villages
No	Village
1	Paraikora
2	Vingrul
3	Sitepetua
4	Kaikhain
5	Purbokonnara
6	Bathuapara
7	Mahata
8	Talsara
9	Chenamati
10	Deotala
11	Patnikota
12	Tishri
13	Shilalia
14	Tatua
15	Oshkhain
16	Mamukhin

== Education ==
According to the 2011 Bangladeshi census, Paraikora Union had a literacy rate of 65.5%.
