= Karnaphuli Upazila =

Upazila in Chittagong Division, Bangladesh

Karnaphuli কর্ণফুলী
- Upazila
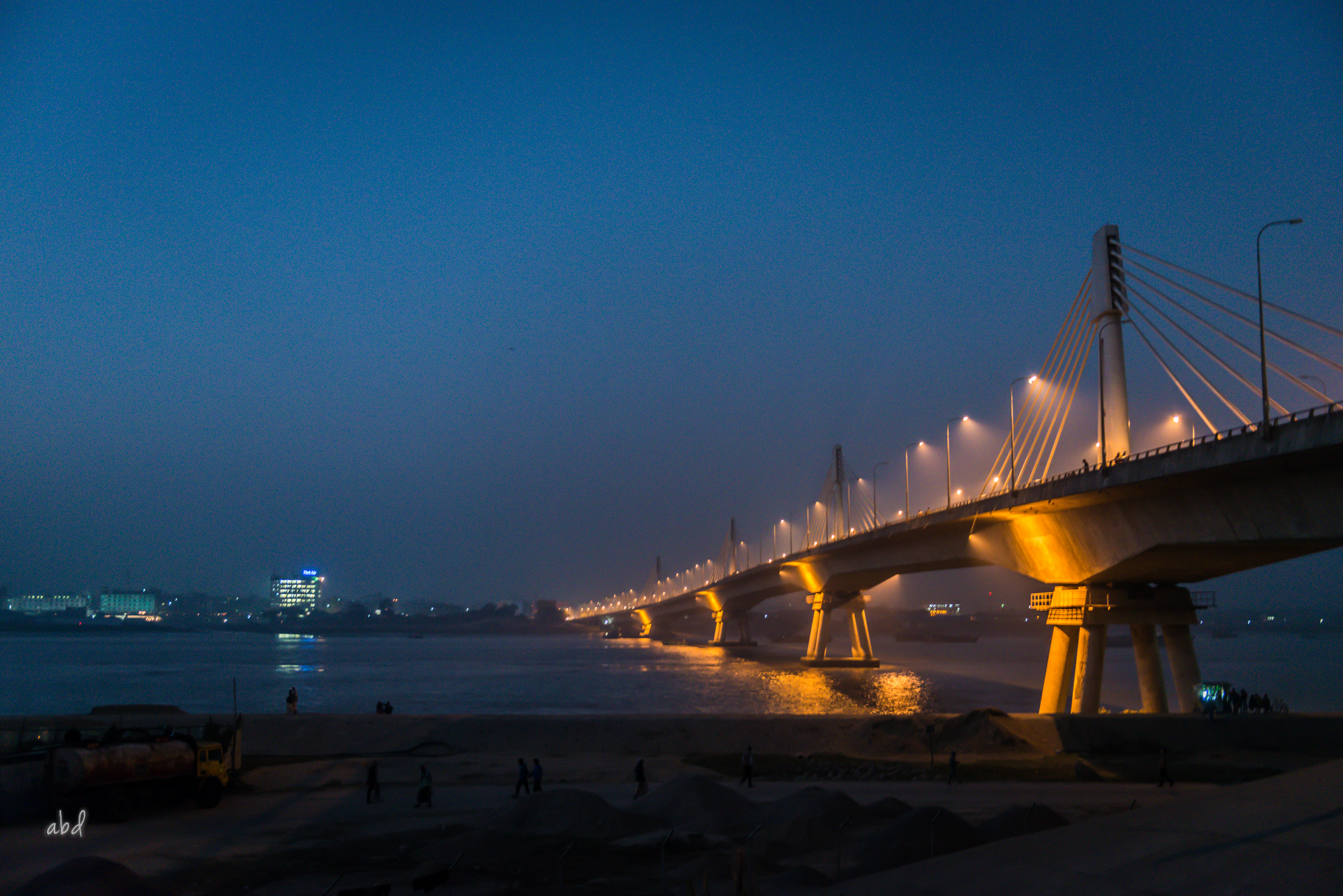
- Shah Amanat Bridge

- Coordinates: 22.3°N 91.9°E
- Country: Bangladesh
- Division: Chittagong
- District: Chittagong
- Jatiya Sangsad constituency: Chittagong-13
- Headquarters: Karnaphuli Upazila Complex

Government
  - Body: Upazila Council
  - MP: Vacant
  - Chairman: Vacant
  - Chief Executive Officer: Masuma Jannat

Area
  - Total: 55.36 km^{2} (21.37 sq mi)

Population (2022)
  - Total: 203,705
  - Density: 3,680/km^{2} (9,530/sq mi)
- Time zone: UTC+6 (BST)
- Postal code: 4371
- Website: karnafuli.chittagong.gov.bd

Karnaphuli (Bengali: কর্ণফুলী) is an upazila of Chittagong District in Chittagong Division, Bangladesh. Administration Karnaphuli Thana was established on 27 May 2000. Karnaphuli, a police station area under Chittagong's Patiya, has been upgraded to an Upazila.

== Demographics ==
Religions in Karnaphuli Upazila (2022)
Religion	Percent
Islam	96.51%
Hinduism	2.97%
Other or not stated	0.52%

According to the 2022 Bangladeshi census, Karnaphuli Upazila had 43,603 households and a population of 203,705. 10.35% of the population were under 5 years of age. Karnaphuli had a literacy rate (age 7 and over) of 77.15%: 79.78% for males and 74.41% for females, and a sex ratio of 104.07 males for every 100 females. 70,001 (34.36%) lived in urban areas.

As of the 2011 Census of Bangladesh, Karnaphuli upazila had 29,975 households and a population of 162,110. 24,015 (14.81%) were under 7 years of age. Karnaphuli had an average literacy rate of 52.07%, compared to the national average of 51.8%, and a sex ratio of 936 females per 1000 males. The entire population was rural.

== Administrative ==
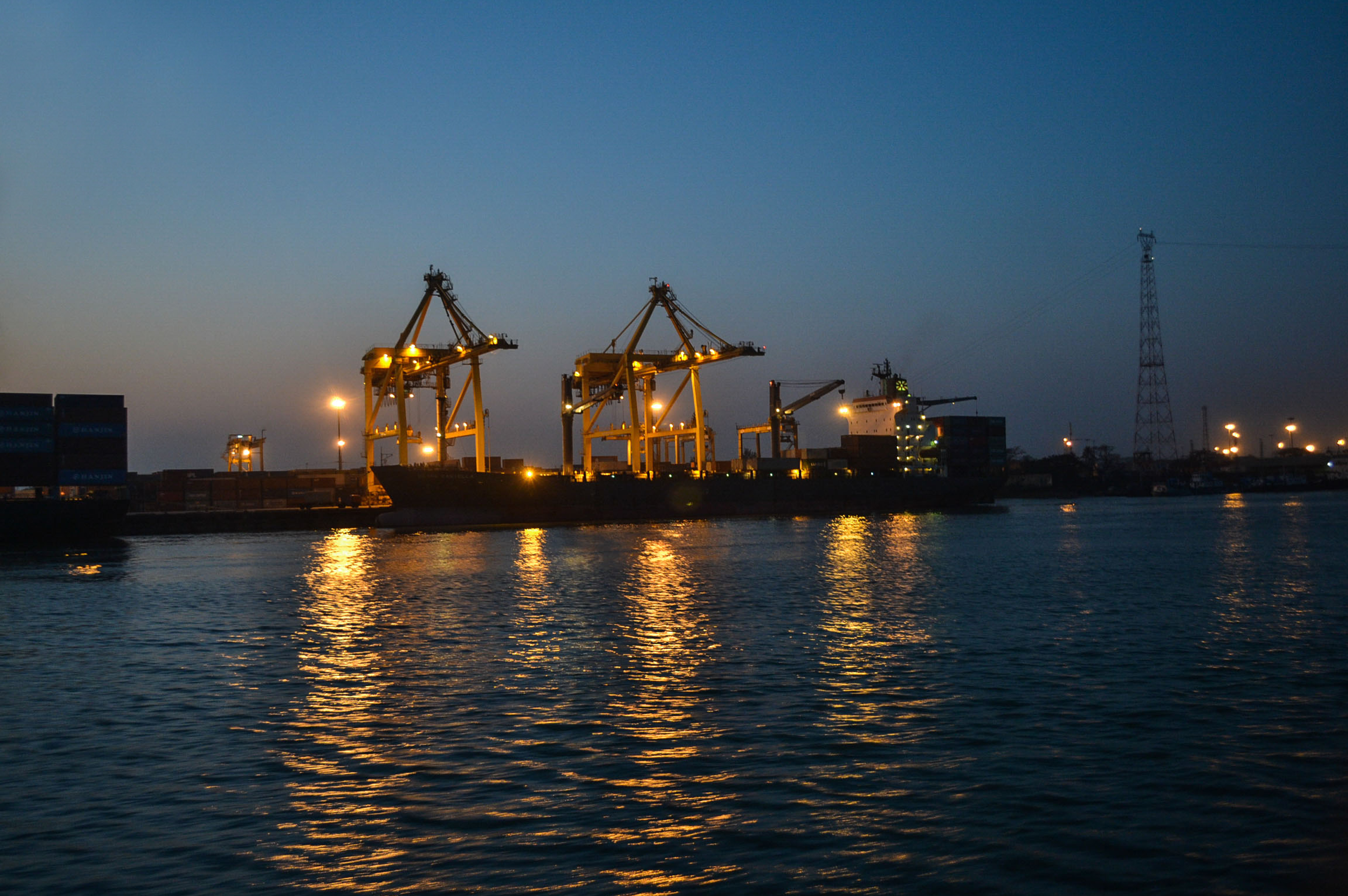
Karnaphuli River

=== Municipality ===
- Karnaphuli

=== Union ===
1. Char Patharghata
2. Shikalbaha
3. Char Lakhya
4. Juldha
5. Bara Uthan

== See also ==
- Upazilas of Bangladesh
- Districts of Bangladesh
- Divisions of Bangladesh
