= Barasat Union =

Barasat Union বারাসাত ইউনিয়ন
- Union
- Location in Bangladesh
- Coordinates: 22.9291°N 89.6602°E
- Country: Bangladesh
- Division: Khulna Division
- District: Khulna District
- Upazila: Terokhada Upazila

Government
  - Type: Union council
- Time zone: UTC+6 (BST)
- Website: barasatup.khulna.gov.bd

Barasat Union (Bengali: বারাসাত ইউনিয়ন) is a union parishad in Terokhada Upazila of Khulna District, in Khulna Division, Bangladesh.
