= Anwara Upazila =

Upazila in Chattogram Division, Bangladesh

Anwara আনোয়ারা
- Upazila
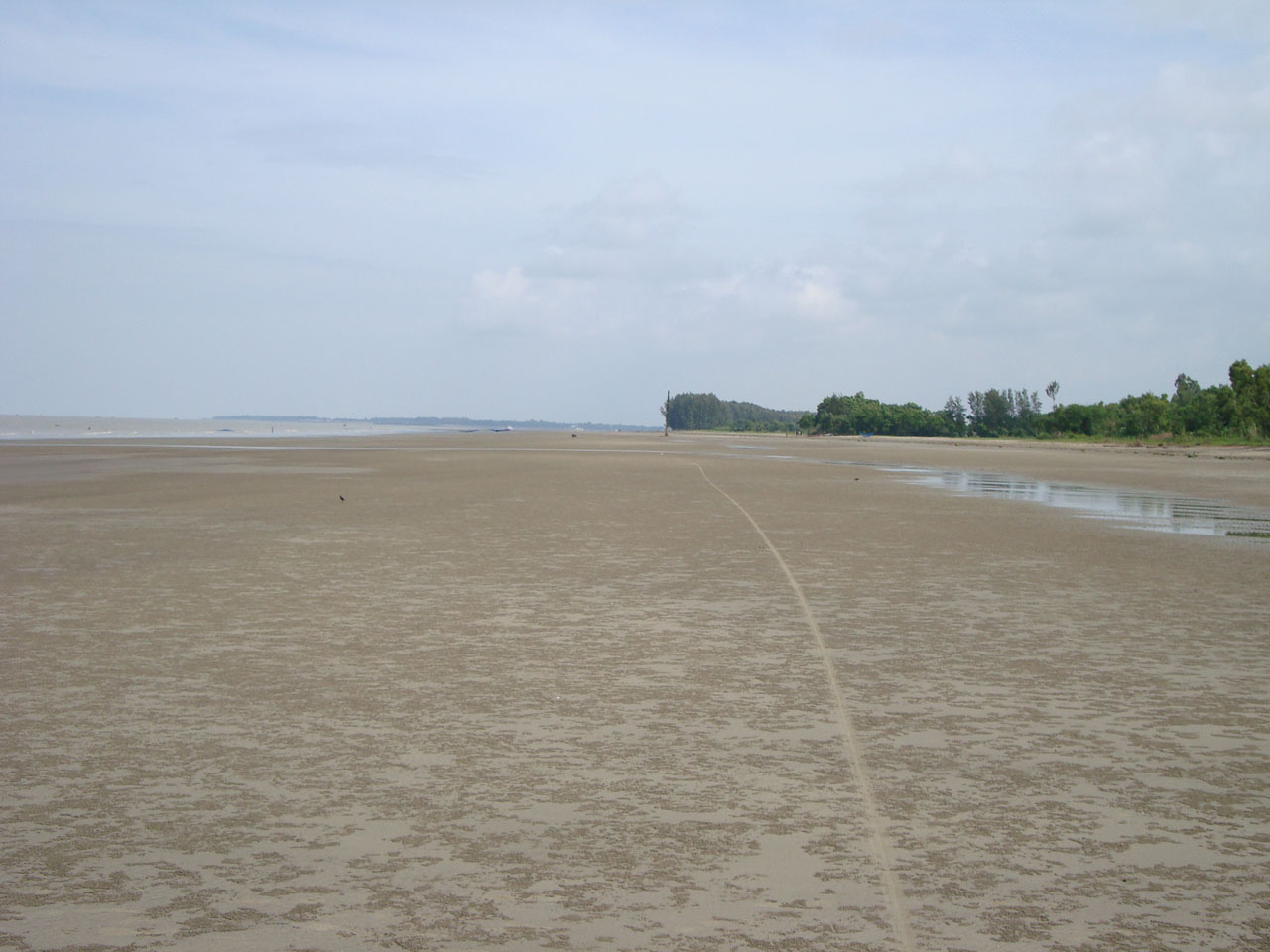
- Parki Beach

- Coordinates: 22°13′N 91°54.7′E
- Country: Bangladesh
- Division: Chittagong
- District: Chittagong
- Jatiya Sangsad constituency: Chittagong-13
- Headquarters: Anwara Upazila Complex

Government
  - Body: Upazila Council
  - MP: Vacant
  - Chairman: Vacant

Area
  - Total: 164.13 km^{2} (63.37 sq mi)

Population (2022)
  - Total: 319,482
  - Density: 1,946.5/km^{2} (5,041.5/sq mi)
- Time zone: UTC+6 (BST)
- Postal code: 4376
- Area code: 03029
- Website: anwara.chittagong.gov.bd

Anwara (Bengali: আনোয়ারা), is an upazila of Chattogram District in Chattogram Division, Bangladesh.

Anowara Upazila mauza geocode map

== Geography ==
Anwara is located at 22.2167°N 91.9111°E. It has 49,966 households and a total area of 164.13 km^{2}.

== Demographics ==
Religions in Anwara Upazila (2022)
Religion	Percent
Islam	86.79%
Hinduism	12.75%
Buddhism	0.44%
Other or not stated	0.02%

Population by religion in Union
Union	Muslim	Hindu	Others
Anwara Union	5,610	8,665	53
Bairag Union	39,620	5,068	217
Barakhain Union	28,381	4,221	1
Barasat Union	32,237	3,592	42
Burumchhara Union	23,634	936	3
Battali Union	30,592	3,291	142
Chatari Union	16,312	5,770	447
Haildhar Union	25,835	3,203	5
Juidandi Union	21,101	301	3
Paraikora Union	16,588	5,293	538
Raypur Union	37,374	401	6

🟩 Muslim majority 🟧 Hindu majority

According to the 2022 Bangladeshi census, Anwara Upazila had 69,057 households and a population of 319,482. 10.01% of the population were under 5 years of age. Anwara had a literacy rate (age 7 and over) of 75.90%: 78.63% for males and 73.24% for females, and a sex ratio of 98.39 males for every 100 females. 38,616 (12.09%) lived in urban areas.

As of the 2011 Census of Bangladesh, Anwara upazila had 49,966 households and a population of 259,022. 66,036 (25.49%) were under 10 years of age. Anwara had an average literacy rate of 51.95%, compared to the national average of 51.8%, and a sex ratio of 1044 females per 1000 males. 5,466 (2.11%) of the population lived in urban areas.

As of the 1991 Bangladesh census, Anwara has a population of 219,446. Males constitute 50.99% of the population, and females 49.01%. Upazila's population over 18 is 107,408. Anwara has an average literacy rate of 30.6% (7+ years), and the national average of 32.4% literate. It has lot of rich men who were born there and almost all of them live in the city of Chittagong.

== Administration ==
Anwara Upazila is divided into 11 union parishads: Anwara, Bairag, Barakhain, Barasat, Burumchhara, Battali, Chatari, Haildhar, Juidandi, Paraikora and Roypur. The union parishads are subdivided into 85 mauzas and 81 villages.

== Upazila Parishad ==
Serial number	Designation	Name
01	Upazila Chairman	vacant
02	Vice Chairman	Vacant
03	Female Vice Chairman	Vacant
04	Upazila Nirbahi Officer	Tahmina Aktar

== See also ==
- Upazilas of Bangladesh
- Districts of Bangladesh
- Divisions of Bangladesh
