= Sangu River =

Coordinates: 22.0642°N 92.3594°E

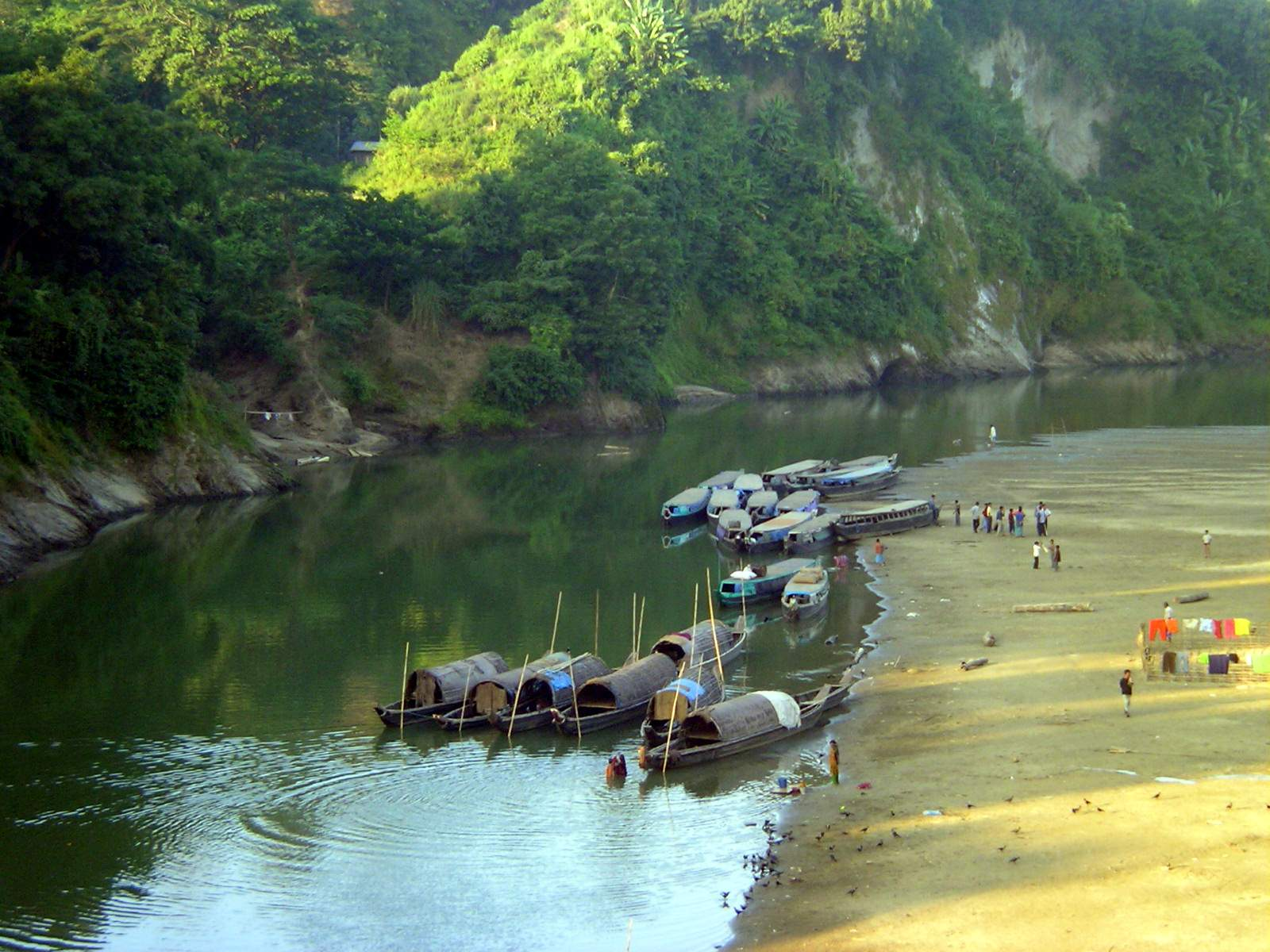
- View of the Sangu River from Bandarban Town in 2004.

Location
- Country: Bangladesh

Physical characteristics
- Source
  - location: North Arakan Hills
- Mouth
  - location: Bay of Bengal
- Length: 270 km (170 mi)

The Sangu River (Bengali: সাঙ্গু নদী; [ʃaŋɡu nod̪i]) is a river in Myanmar and Bangladesh. Its source is in the North Arakan Hills of Myanmar, located at 21°13´N 92°37´E. The Arakan Hills form the boundary between Arakan and the Chittagong Hill Tracts. It follows a northerly circuitous course in the hill tracts and then enters Bangladesh near Remaikri, Thanchi Upazila, Bandarban District, from the east. It flows north through Thanchi, Rowangchhari and Bandarban Sadar Upazilas of Bandarban district. It then flows west through Satkania and Banshkhali Upazilas in Chittagong district and flows into the Bay of Bengal near Chittagong, at 22°6´N 91°51´E, or about 16.09 kilometres (10.00 mi) south of the mouth of the Karnafuli River. The length of the river is 270 kilometres (170 mi) of which 173 kilometres (107 mi) are located within Bangladesh.

The major tributaries of the river are the Chand Khali Nadi and Dolukhal. The Chand Khali Nadi flows through the Patiya Plains, and the Dolukhal drains into the Satkania Plains. Another tributary is the Kumira Khali, which drains into the Kutubdia Channel. It has a connection with the Karnafuli River through the Chand Khali River.

Its estimated annual flow is 4.5 million acre-feet.

The Sangu River drainage basin has a total area of 3,843 square kilometres (1,484 sq mi). The river drains Banshkhali, Satkania, and Patiya Upazilas.

In 1876, William Wilson Hunter described the river as shallow, but navigable year round by large cargo boats for a distance of 48 kilometres (30 mi). He also mentioned considerable river traffic at Bandarban. A century later the Bangladesh District Gazetteer for the area said the river is not navigable late in the dry season. During the Indo-Pakistani war of 1971, the Indian Special Frontier Force destroyed the Dohazari Bridge over the Sangu to keep Pakistani forces from withdrawing through Chittagong to Burma.

In its upper course there are two waterfalls and several rapids.

The offshore Sangu Gas Field is located in the Bay of Bengal about 50 kilometres (31 mi) southwest of Chittagong at a depth of 10 metres (33 ft).

== Ecology ==
Finfish in the Sangu River include 106 native species, among them several species of carp and gobies. Three non-native species have been found in the river: bighead carp, silver carp, and Nile tilapia. In addition to finfish, the river supports 16 species of prawns and 2 species of crabs.

Ganges river dolphins are found in the river, especially below the Dohazari Bridge.

== See also ==
- Sangu Matamuhari
