= Barkal Union =

Barkal Union is a union in Chittagong Division, Bangladesh. It may refer to:

- Barkal Union, Barkal, a union in Barkal Upazila
- Barkal Union, Chandanaish, a union in Chandanaish Upazila
