= Dhopachhari Union =

Union of Chandanaish Upazila, Chittagong District, Bangladesh

Dhopachhari Union ধোপাছড়ি ইউনিয়ন
- Union
- Location in Bangladesh
- Coordinates: 22°14′N 92°8′E
- Country: Bangladesh
- Division: Chittagong Division
- District: Chittagong District
- Upazilas: Chandanaish Upazila

Government
  - Chairman: Vacant

Area
  - Total: 57.77 km^{2} (22.31 sq mi)

Population (2011)
  - Total: 10,175
- Time zone: UTC+6 (BST)
- Postal code: 4381
- Website: dhopachhariup.chattogram.gov.bd

Dhopachhari Union (Bengali: ধোপাছড়ি ইউনিয়ন) is a union, the smallest administrative body of Bangladesh, located in Chandanaish Upazila, Chittagong District, Bangladesh. The total population is 10,175.

== Area ==
The area of Dhopachhari Union is 14,277 acres (57.77 square kilometers).

== Demographics ==
According to the 2011 Bangladeshi census, Dhopachhari Union had a population of 10,175, of which 5,075 were males and 5,100 were females. The total number of households was 2,076.

== Geography ==
Dhopachhari Union is located across the entire eastern part and the northernmost area of Chandanaish Upazila, approximately 20 kilometres from the upazila headquarters. It is bordered on the west by Dohazari Municipality, Hashimpur Union, Kanchanabad Union, Kachuai Union and Haidgaon Union of Patiya Upazila; on the north by Padua Union of Rangunia Upazila; on the east by Puranagar Union of Satkania Upazila, Kuhalong Union and Bandarban Municipality of Bandarban Sadar Upazila, Bandarban District; and on the south by Dohazari Municipality and Puranagar Union of Satkania Upazila.

== Administration ==
Dhopachhari Union is the 10th Union Parishad under Chandanaish Upazila. The administrative activities of this union fall under the jurisdiction of Chandanaiish Thana. It is part of Chittagong-14 (Constituency 291) of the National Parliament of Bangladesh. The villages of Dhopachhari Union are:

Villages
No.	Village name
1	Purba Dhopachhari
2	Pashchim Dhopachhari
3	Chiringghata

== Education ==
According to the 2011 Bangladeshi census, Dhopachhari Union had a literacy rate of 30.3%.
