= Barkal =

Barkal may refer to the following places:

- Barkal Upazila, a sub-district of Rangamati District in the Division of Chittagong, Bangladesh
  - Barkal Union, Barkal, a union of Rangamati District
- Barkal Union, Chandanaish, a union of Chittagong District
- Jebel Barkal, a mountain in Karima town in Northern State, Sudan
