= Kanchanabad Union =

Union of Chandanaish Upazila, Chittagong District, Bangladesh

Kanchanabad Union কাঞ্চনাবাদ ইউনিয়ন
- Union
- Location in Bangladesh
- Coordinates: 22°14′N 92°2′E
- Country: Bangladesh
- Division: Chittagong Division
- District: Chittagong District
- Upazilas: Chandanaish Upazila

Government
  - Chairman: Vacant

Area
  - Total: 23.03 km^{2} (8.89 sq mi)

Population (2011)
  - Total: 24,701
- Time zone: UTC+6 (BST)
- Postal code: 4381
- Website: kanchanabadup.chattogram.gov.bd

Kanchanabad Union (Bengali: কাঞ্চনাবাদ ইউনিয়ন) is a union, the smallest administrative body of Bangladesh, located in Chandanaish Upazila, Chittagong District, Bangladesh. The total population is 24,701.

== Area ==
The area of Kanchanabad Union is 5,691 acres (23.03 square kilometers).

== Demographics ==
According to the 2011 Bangladeshi census, Kanchanabad Union had a population of 24,701, of which 13,060 were males and 11,641 were females. The total number of households was 4,505.

== Geography ==
Kanchanabad Union is situated in the northern part of Chandanaish Upazila, approximately 6 kilometres from the upazila headquarters. It is bounded on the east by Dhopachhari Union and Hashimpur Union, on the south by Hashimpur Union, Joara Union and Chandanaish Municipality, on the west by Joara Union, Sobhandandi Union and Kharana Union of Patiya Upazila, and on the north by Kharana Union of Patiya Upazila and Kachuai Union.

== Administration ==
Kanchanabad Union is the 1st Union Parishad under Chandanaish Upazila. The administrative activities of this union fall under the jurisdiction of Chandanaiish Thana. It is part of Chittagong-14 (Constituency 291) of the National Parliament of Bangladesh.

== Education ==
According to the 2011 Bangladeshi census, Kanchanabad Union had a literacy rate of 48.7%.

== Rivers and Canals ==
The Sonai Chhari Canal and the Guilla Chhari Canal flow through Kanchanabad Union.

== Markets ==
The main market of Kanchanabad Union is Rowshan Hat.
