= Joara Union =

Union of Chandanaish Upazila, Chittagong District, Bangladesh

Joara Union জোয়ারা ইউনিয়ন
- Union
- Location in Bangladesh
- Coordinates: 22°13.5′N 92°0.5′E
- Country: Bangladesh
- Division: Chittagong Division
- District: Chittagong District
- Upazilas: Chandanaish Upazila

Government
  - Chairman: Vacant

Area
  - Total: 6.68 km^{2} (2.58 sq mi)

Population (2011)
  - Total: 10,381
- Time zone: UTC+6 (BST)
- Postal code: 4380
- Website: joaraup.chattogram.gov.bd

Joara Union (Bengali: জোয়ারা ইউনিয়ন) is a union, the smallest administrative body of Bangladesh, located in Chandanaish Upazila, Chittagong District, Bangladesh. The total population is 10,381.

== Area ==
The area of Joara Union is 1,653 acres (6.68 square kilometers).

== Demographics ==
According to the 2011 Bangladeshi census, Joara Union had a population of 10,381, of which 5,366 were males and 5,015 were females. The total number of households was 2,013.

== Geography ==
Joara Union is located in the northwestern part of Chandanaish Upazila, approximately 1.5 kilometres from the upazila headquarters. It is bordered on the east by Kanchanabad Union, on the south by Chandanaish Municipality, on the west by Barkal Union and Sobhandandi Union of Patiya Upazila, and on the north by Kanchanabad Union and Sobhandandi Union of Patiya Upazila.

== Administration ==
Joara Union is the 2nd Union Parishad under Chandanaish Upazila. The administrative activities of this union fall under the jurisdiction of Chandanaiish Thana. It is part of Chittagong-14 (Constituency 291) of the National Parliament of Bangladesh.

== Education ==
According to the 2011 Bangladeshi census, Joara Union had a literacy rate of 63.8%.
