= Pomara High School =

- পোমরা উচ্চ বিদ্যালয়

Location
- Pomara Rangunia Upazila; Chittagong; Bangladesh
- Coordinates: 22°27′14″N 92°01′10″E

Information
- School type: Public secondary school
- Motto: জ্ঞান অন্বেষণ প্রবেশ কর (Enter and explore the knowledge)
- Opened: 1928
- Staff: 150
- Language: Bengali
- Hours in school day: 6

Pomara High School (Bengali: পোমরা উচ্চ বিদ্যালয়) is a secondary school in the coastal area of Bangladesh. The school is situated in Pomara, Rangunia Upazila, Bangladesh. It was founded in 1928.

== See also ==
- List of schools in Bangladesh
- Rotary Betagi Union High School
