= Rangunia Upazila =

Upazila in Chittagong Division, Bangladesh

Rangunia রাঙ্গুনিয়া
- Upazila
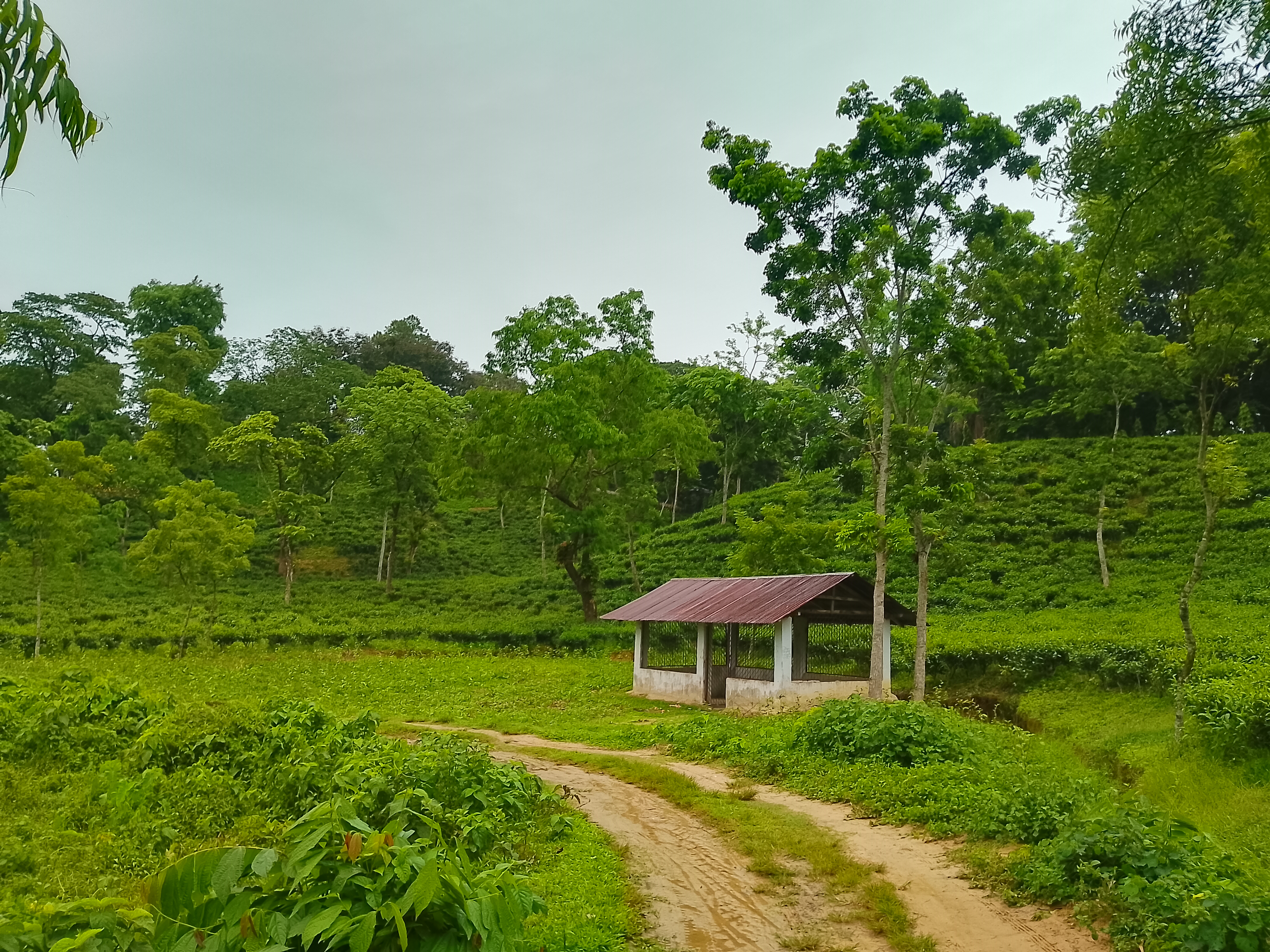
- Kodala Tea Garden

- Coordinates: 22°28′N 92°5′E
- Country: Bangladesh
- Division: Chittagong
- District: Chittagong
- Jatiya Sangsad constituency: Chittagong-7
- Headquarters: Rangunia Upazila Complex

Government
  - Body: Upazila Council
  - MP: Vacant
  - Chairman: Vacant
  - Chief Executive Officer: Md. Raihan Mehbub

Area
  - Total: 361.54 km^{2} (139.59 sq mi)

Population (2022)
  - Total: 392,904
  - Density: 1,086.8/km^{2} (2,814.7/sq mi)
- Time zone: UTC+6 (BST)
- Postal code: 4360
- Area code: 03025
- Website: rangunia.ctg.gov.bd

Rangunia Upazila mauza geocode map

Rangunia (Bengali: রাঙ্গুনিয়া) is an upazila of Chittagong District in Chittagong Division, Bangladesh.

== History ==
Chakma kings (Shukdev Roy, Sher Daulat Khan, Jan Baksh Khan, Tabbar Khan, Jabbar Khan, Dharam Baksh Khan, Rani Kalindi, Harish Chandra Rai and others) ruled this area since 1757. Chakma King Harish Chandra transferred his capital from Rajanagar of Rangunia to Rangamati in 1874.

== Geography ==
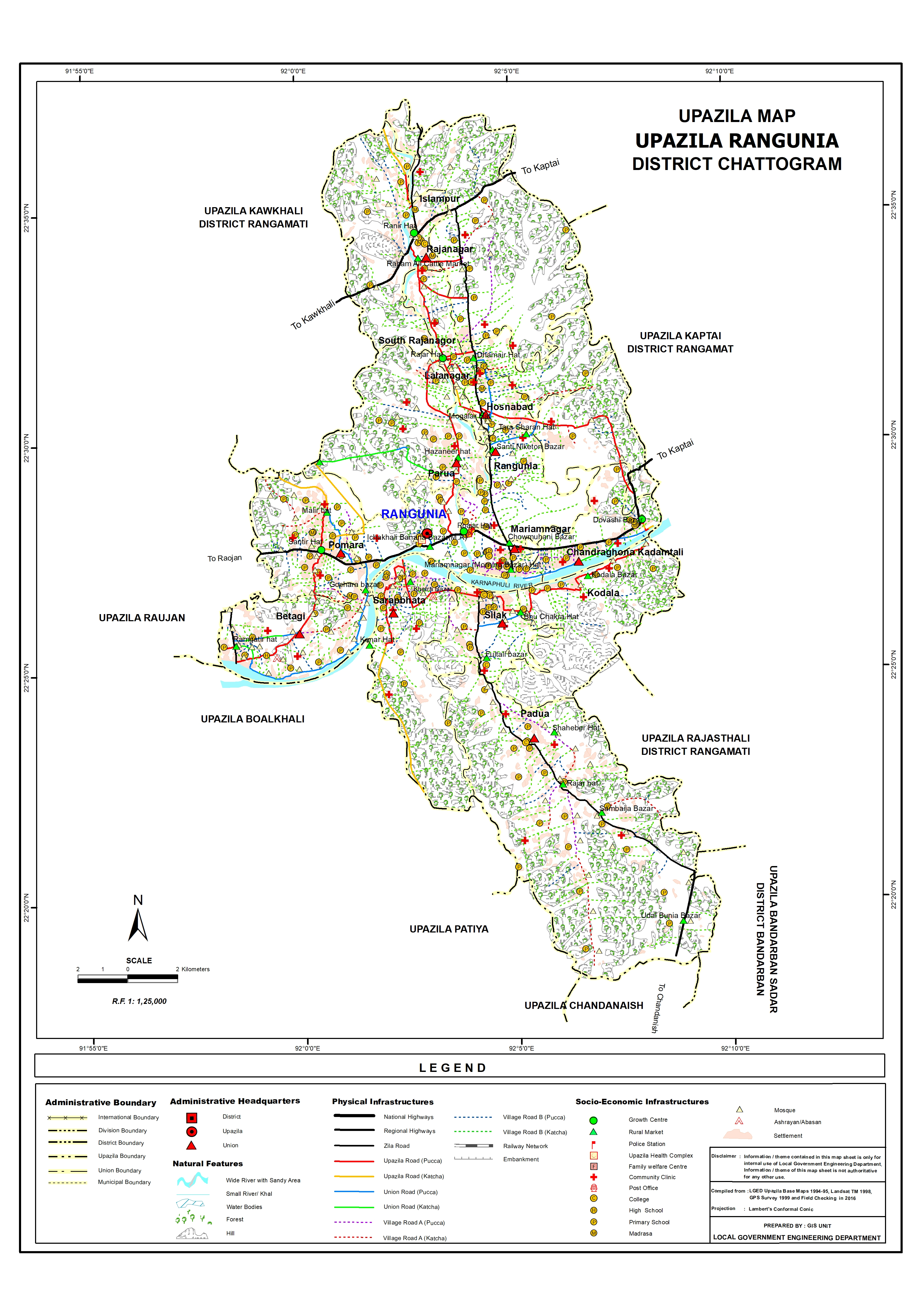
Rangunia

Rangunia Upazila is located in between 22°18' and 22°37' north latitudes and in between 91°58' and 92°08' east longitudes. It has a total area of 361.54 km^{2}.

It is bounded by Chandanaish Upazila on the south; Patiya Upazila, Boalkhali Upazila, Raozan Upazila & Kawkhali Upazila of Rangamati District on the west; Kawkhali Upazila of Rangamati District on the north and Kaptai Upazila & Rajasthali Upazila of Rangamati District and Bandarban Sadar Upazila on the east. Rangunia is the administrative headquarter of this upazila.

Main river: Karnaphuli, Ichamoti.

== Demographics ==
Religions in Rangunia Upazila (2022)
| Religion | Percent |
| Islam | 84.22% |
| Hinduism | 11.46% |
| Buddhism | 4.23% |
| Other or not stated | 0.11% |

According to the 2022 Bangladeshi census, Rangunia Upazila had 90,708 households and a population of 392,904. 9.76% of the population were under 5 years of age. Rangunia had a literacy rate (age 7 and over) of 77.60%: 78.69% for males and 76.63% for females, and a sex ratio of 91.35 males for every 100 females. 113,749 (28.95%) lived in urban areas.

The ethnic population was 4,678 (1.19%), of which the Marma were 2,734, Tanchangya people 931 and Chakma 828.

== Points of interest ==
=== Tourists spots ===
- Aviary Park and Eco Park, Rangunia
- Rahmania Islamic Complex
- Baitul Musharraf Shahi Jame Masjid
- Remnants of the Chakma Rajbari (Shukhbilash, Padua)
- Mahamuni Buddhist Monastery
- Tea garden (Agunia, Kodala, Thandachhari).

=== Archaeological heritage & relics ===
- Rahmania Islamic Complex
- Baitul Musharraf Shahi Jame Masjid
- Pagla Mama Dargah (19th century)

== Administration ==
Rangunia Thana was formed on 24 January 1962 and it was turned into an upazila in 1983. Municipality was formed on 4 July 2000.

Rangunia Upazila is divided into Rangunia Municipality and 15 union parishads: Betagi, Chandraghona, Dakshin Rajanagar, Hosnabad, Islampur, Kodala, Lalanagar, Mariumnagar, Padua, Parua, Pomara, Rajanagar, Rangunia, Sharafbhata, and Silak. The union parishads are subdivided into 73 mauzas and 138 villages.

Rangunia Municipality is subdivided into 9 wards and 22 mahallas.

- Perliamentery Area: 284 Chittagong-7 (including Shreepur-Kharandweep Union of Boalkhali Upazila)
- Member of Perliament: Vacant
- Municipality chairman: Vacant
- Upazila Chairman: Vacant
- Vice Chairman: Vacant
- Woman Vice Chairman: Vacant
- Upazila Nirbahi Officer (UNO): Mohammad Arif uddin

== Infrastructure ==
=== Communication Facilities ===
- Chittagong-Rangamati Highway
- Chittagong-Kaptai Highway
- Chandraghona-Bandarban Highway
- Mariamnagar-Ranirhat Link Road
- Rowazarhat-Ranirhat Link Road
- Godown-Padua Link Road
- Godown-Boalkhali Link Road

=== Health centres ===
Upazila health complex 1, family planning centre 11, satellite clinic 2.

=== Religious Institutions ===
Mosque 359, Temple 42, Tomb 3, Pagoda 41, Sacred place 1.

== Education ==
Rangunia Upazila had an average literacy rate of 70.75%.

There are 9 colleges, 40 secondary schools, 25 madrasas, 179 primary school and many other registered and kindergartens in the upazila.

=== Colleges ===
1. Rangunia Govt. College
2. Rangunia Women College
3. North Rangunia Degree College
4. Rajanagar Ranirhat Degree College
5. Syeda Selima Qader Chowdhury Degree College
6. South Rangunia Padua College
7. M Shah Alam Chowdhury Degree College
8. Hasina Jamal Degree College
9. Shilok Balika Mohabidhyaloy
10. Rangunia Alamsha Para Alia Madrasha
11. Pomra Jameul Ulum Degree Madrasha

According to Banglapedia, Pomara High School, founded in 1928, Rangunia Ideal Multilateral Pilot High School (1915), Rangunia Khilmogal Rashik High School (1926), Rangunia Majumdarkhil High School (1927), and Uttar Rangunia High School (1942) are notable secondary schools.

== Newspapers and periodicals ==
- Ranguniar Khobor (weekly)
- Rupali Rangunia
- Ashar Alo
- Rangunia Sangbad
- Rangunianews24.com

== During the War of Liberation ==
In 1971, encounters were held between the freedom fighters and the Pak army at Ranirhat, Rowajarhat and Rangunia. The Pak army conducted looting, burning, rape and mass killing in various places of the upazila.

- Marks of the War of Liberation
  - Mass Grave - 2
  - Memorial Monument - 3 (Rangunia College, Rangunia Ideal Multilateral Pilot High School and Ichakhali).

== Notable residents ==
- Saranangkar Thera, Buddhist monk, began construction of Gayanasarana Buddhism Meditation Center in Falaharia village in 2012.

== See also ==
- Rangunia
- Upazilas of Bangladesh
- Districts of Bangladesh
- Divisions of Bangladesh
