= Barama Union =

Union of Chandanaish Upazila, Chittagong District, Bangladesh

Barama Union বরমা ইউনিয়ন
- Union
- Location in Bangladesh
- Coordinates: 22°11′N 91°59′E
- Country: Bangladesh
- Division: Chittagong Division
- District: Chittagong District
- Upazilas: Chandanaish Upazila

Government
  - Chairman: Vacant

Area
  - Total: 9.61 km^{2} (3.71 sq mi)

Population (2011)
  - Total: 22,985
- Time zone: UTC+6 (BST)
- Postal code: 4383
- Website: baramaup.chattogram.gov.bd

Barama Union (Bengali: বরমা ইউনিয়ন) is a union, the smallest administrative body of Bangladesh, located in Chandanaish Upazila, Chittagong District, Bangladesh. The total population is 22,985.

== Area ==
The area of Barama Union is 2,375 acres (9.61 square kilometers).

== Demographics ==
According to the 2011 Bangladeshi census, Barama Union had a population of 22,985, of which 11,612 were males and 11,373 were females. The total number of households was 4,278.

== Geography ==
Barama Union is located in the western part of Chandanaish Upazila, about 8.5 kilometres from the upazila headquarters. It is bordered on the north by Barkal Union and Chandanaish Municipality; on the east by Chandanaish Municipality and Satbaria Union; on the south by Bailtali Union and Charati Union of Satkania Upazila; and on the west by Charati Union of Satkania Upazila, the Sangu River, and Haildhar Union of Anwara Upazila.

== Administration ==
Barama Union is the 5th Union Parishad under Chandanaish Upazila. The administrative activities of this union fall under the jurisdiction of Chandanaiish Thana. It is part of Chittagong-14 (Constituency 291) of the National Parliament of Bangladesh. The villages of Barama Union are:

Villages
No.	Village name
1	Shebondi
2	Uttar Keshua
3	Bainjuri
4	Pashchim Keshua
5	Raulibag
6	Char Barama
7	Maigata
8	Batajuri
9	Barama
10	Dakshin Aralia

== Education ==
According to the 2011 Bangladeshi census, Barama Union had a literacy rate of 62.2%.
