= Bhushanchhara =

Bhushanchhara may refer to:

- Bhushanchhara Union, an union of Rangamati District
- Bhushanchhara massacre, a massacre in Chittagong Hill Tracts, Bangladesh
