= Bailtali Union =

Union of Chandanaish Upazila, Chittagong District, Bangladesh

Bailtali Union বৈলতলী ইউনিয়ন
- Union
- Location in Bangladesh
- Coordinates: 22°9.5′N 92°1′E
- Country: Bangladesh
- Division: Chittagong Division
- District: Chittagong District
- Upazilas: Chandanaish Upazila

Area
  - Total: 9.54 km^{2} (3.68 sq mi)

Population (2011)
  - Total: 22,652
- Time zone: UTC+6 (BST)
- Postal code: 4383
- Website: bailtaliup.chittagong.gov.bd

Bailtali Union (Bengali: বৈলতলী ইউনিয়ন) is a union, the smallest administrative body of Bangladesh, located in Chandanaish Upazila, Chittagong District, Bangladesh. The total population is 22,652.

== Area ==
The area of Bailtali Union is 2,359 acres (9.54 square kilometers).

== Demographics ==
According to the 2011 Bangladeshi census, Bailtali Union had a population of 22,652, of which 11,171 were males and 11,481 were females. The total number of households was 4,394.

== Geography ==
Bailtali Union is located in the southwestern part of Chandanaish Upazila, approximately 14 kilometres from the upazila headquarters. It is bordered on the north by Barama Union and Satbaria Union, Chandanaish; on the east by Khagaria Union of Satkania Upazila; on the south by Nalua Union, Amilais Union, and Charati Union of Satkania Upazila; and on the west by Charati Union of Satkania Upazila.

== Administration ==
Bailtali Union is the 6th Union Parishad under Chandanaish Upazila. The administrative activities of this union fall under the jurisdiction of Chandanaiish Thana. It is part of Chittagong-14 (Constituency 291) of the National Parliament of Bangladesh. The villages of this union are:

Villages
| No. | Village name |
|---|---|
| 1 | Jafrabad |
| 2 | Bailtali |
| 3 | Basharat Nagar |

== Education ==
According to the 2011 Bangladeshi census, Bailtali Union had a literacy rate of 53.4%.
