= Rangunia Khilmogal Rashik High School =

High school in Chittagong, Bangladesh

Coordinates: 22.5034°N 92.07134°E

Rangunia Khilmogal Rashik High School (Bengali: রাঙ্গুনীয়া খিলমোগল রসিক উচ্চ বিদ্যালয়) is a secondary school in Rangunia, Chittagong, Bangladesh. It is located at No.3 Swanirvar, Rangunia Union, West Shabak Rangunia village.

== History ==
In 1926 the school was established on land donated by Rasik Chandra Chowdhury. The school later acquired land donated by Talukder Abdul Shobana and Virendra Lal Paul.

The school got its first academic recognition from the University of Calcutta in 1944. Haji Azizur Rahman served as headmaster at the school in 1950–56.
