= Shahchand Auliya Kamil Madrasa =

Madrasa in Chittagong, Bangladesh

Location
- Patiya Municipality, Chittagong; Bangladesh
- Coordinates: 22.2887°N 91.9864°E

Information
- Established: January 1, 1928; 98 years ago
- Founder: Syed Nurul Huq
- Grades: Kamil (Masters) from Ibtedei
- Affiliation: Islamic University, Bangladesh (2006-2016); Islamic Arabic University (2016-present)

Shahchand Auliya Kamil Madrasa (Arabic: المدرسة الكاملية شاه تشاند الأولياء) is a religious educational institute in Chittagong.

== Location ==
It is located in the Patiya Upazila of Chittagong district. The madrasa is located in about 5 acres of land.

== History ==
This madrasa as established in 1928. Its founder was Syed Nurul Huq Shah, and he was the first principal of the madrasa.

== Educational activities ==
The educational program is following the guidelines of Islamic University, Kushtia and Bangladesh Madrasa Education Board under the Government of the People's Republic of Bangladesh. Ebtedayee level of primary equivalent level is 5 years, Secondary and lower secondary equivalent submission and JDC level 5 years, Higher level level of Alim level 2 years, Bachelor equivalent Fazil level 3 years and postgraduate equivalent level 2 years with education in 17 categories.

== Results ==
In the Dakhil examination of the year 2017, this madrasa had the top results in the upazila.

== Gallery ==
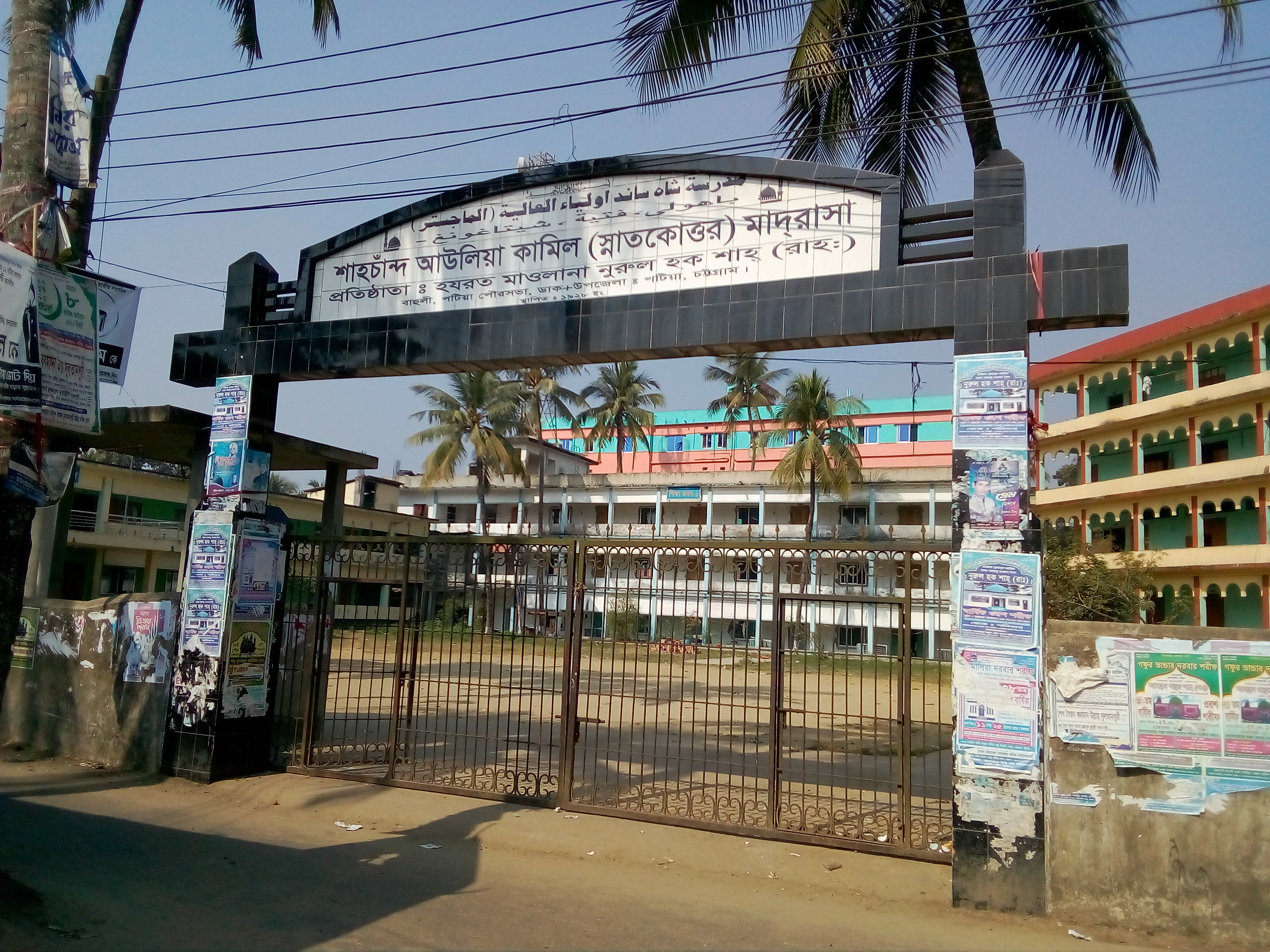

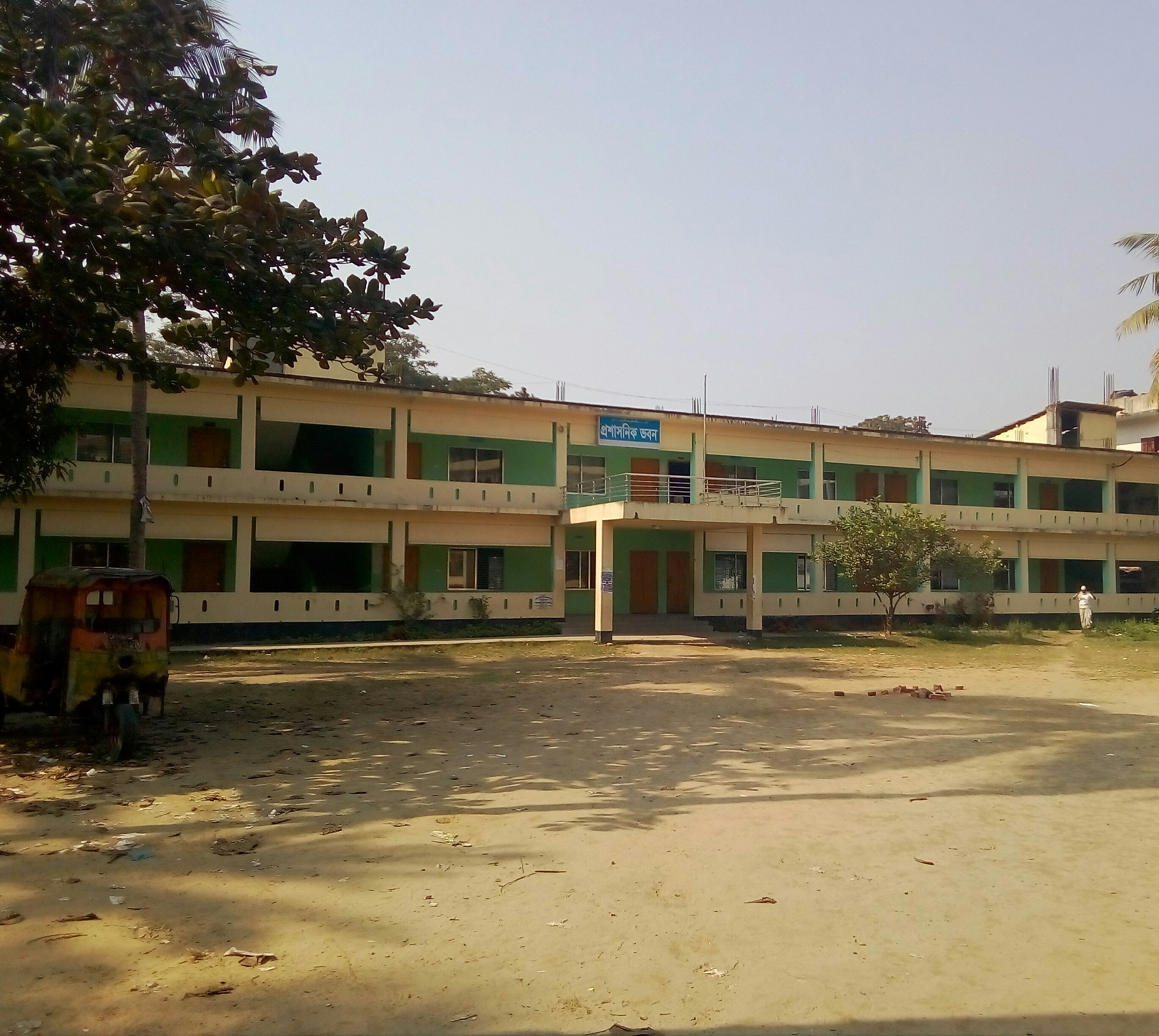

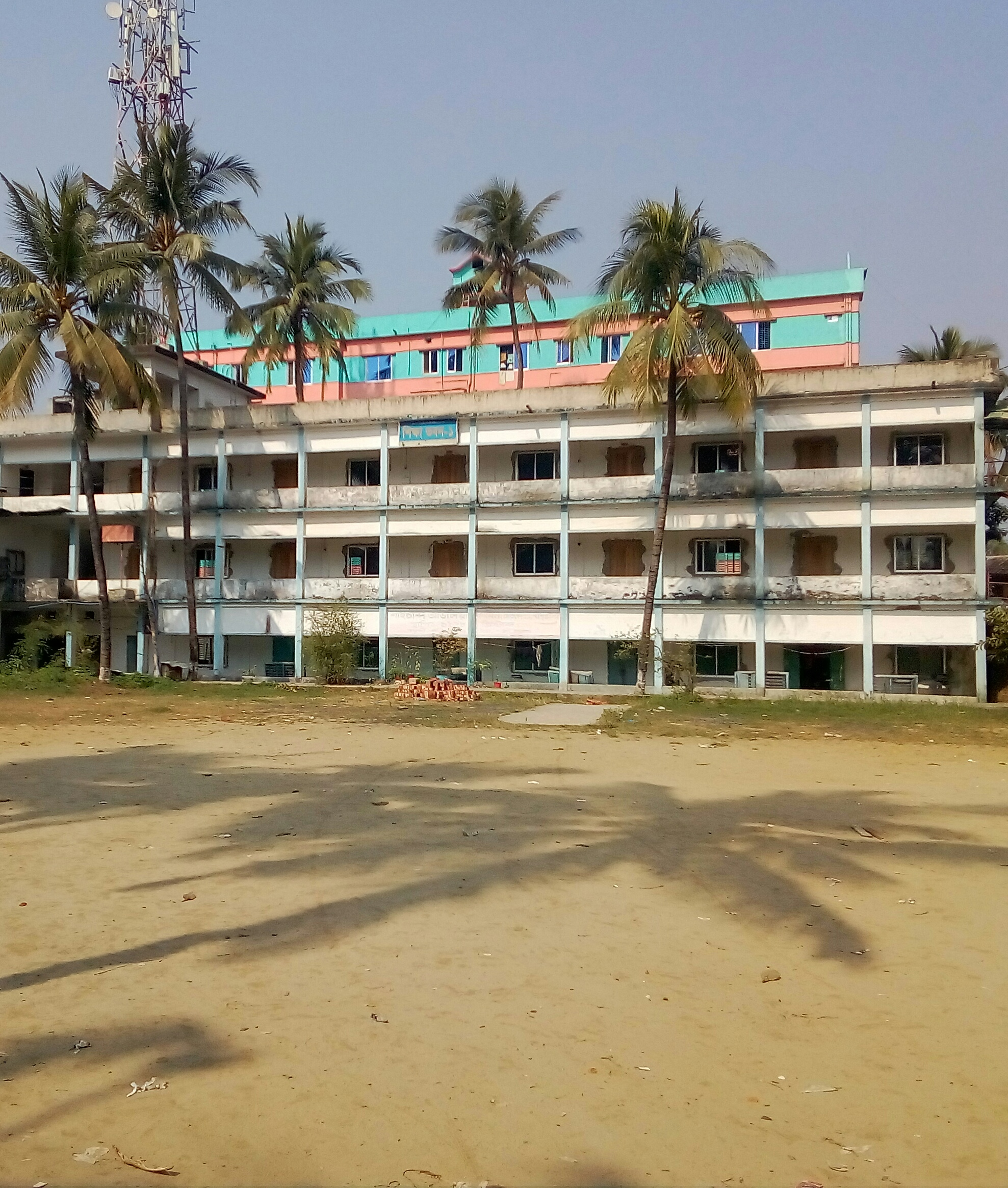

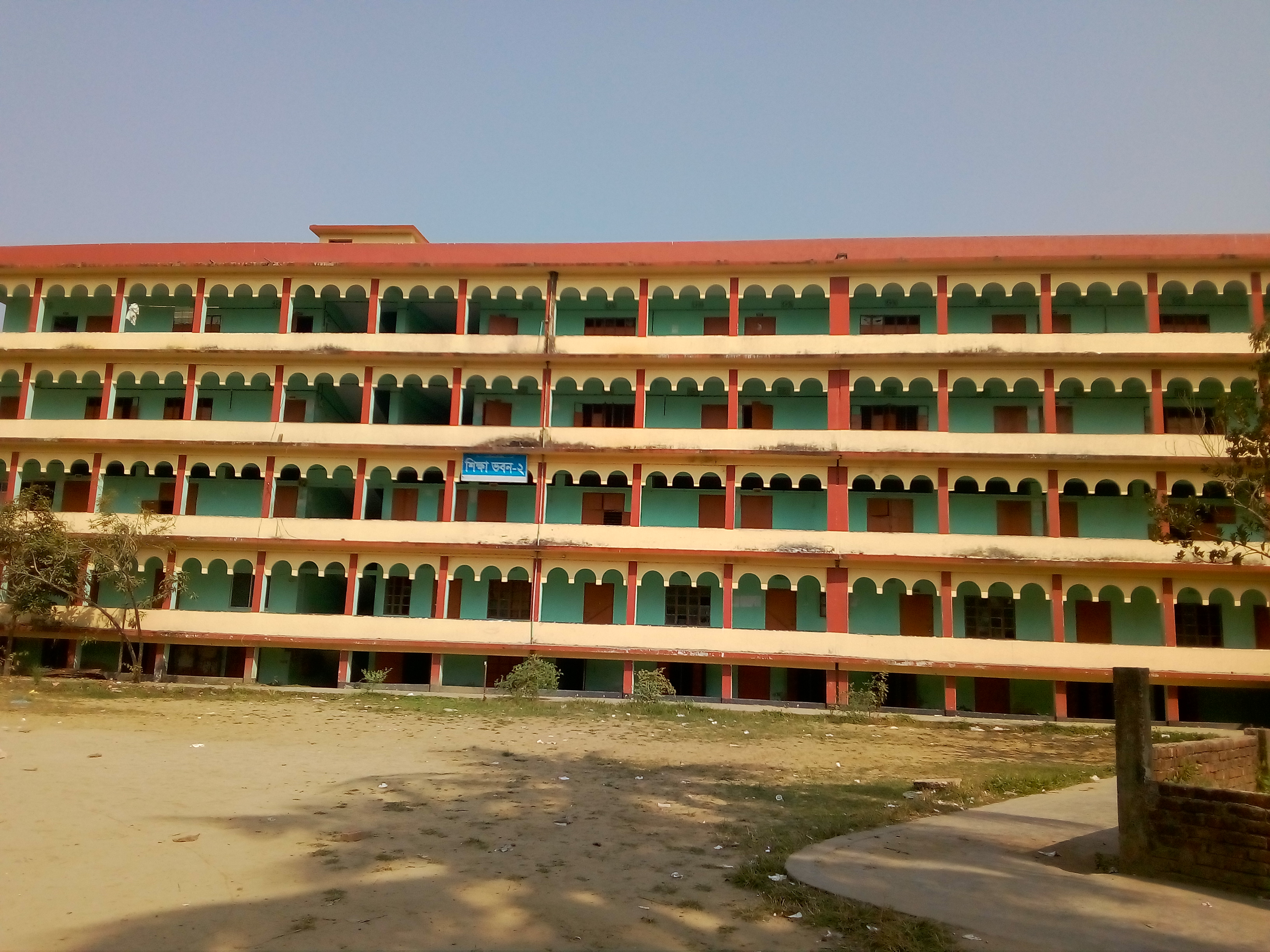
