= Kelishahar Union =

Union of Patiya Upazila, Chittagong District, Bangladesh

Kelishahar Union কেলিশহর ইউনিয়ন
- Union
- Location in Bangladesh
- Coordinates: 22°19.5′N 92°0.5′E
- Country: Bangladesh
- Division: Chittagong Division
- District: Chittagong District
- Upazilas: Patiya Upazila

Government
  - Chairman: Vacant

Area
  - Total: 43.72 km^{2} (16.88 sq mi)

Population (2011)
  - Total: 16,095
- Time zone: UTC+6 (BST)
- Postal code: 4370
- Website: kelishaharup.chattogram.gov.bd

Kelishahar Union (Bengali: কেলিশহর ইউনিয়ন) is a union, the smallest administrative body of Bangladesh, located in Patiya Upazila, Chittagong District, Bangladesh. The total population is 16,095.

== Area ==
The area of Kelishahar Union is 10,803 acres (43.72 square kilometres).

== Demographics ==
According to the 2011 Bangladeshi census, Kelishahar Union had a population of 16,095, of which 7,654 were males and 8,441 were females. The total number of households was 3,598.

Religions in Kelishahar Union (2022)
Religion	Percent
Hinduism	49.84%
Islam	48.19%
Other or not stated	1.97%

== Geography ==
Kelishahar Union is located in the northern part of Patiya Upazila, approximately 6 kilometres from the upazila headquarters. It is bounded to the west by Dhalghat Union and Dakhin Bhushi Union, to the south by Patiya Municipality and Haidgaon Union, to the east by Haidgaon Union and Ahla Karaldanga Union of Boalkhali Upazila, and to the north by Ahla Karaldanga Union of Boalkhali Upazila.

== Administration ==
Kelishahar Union is the 11th Union Parishad under Patiya Upazila. The administrative activities of the union fall under the jurisdiction of Patiya Thana. It is part of Chittagong-12 (Constituency 289) of the National Parliament of Bangladesh. The villages in the union are as follows:

Villages
No.	Village name
1	Kelishahar
2	Ratanpur
3	East Ratanpur
4	Chhattor Petua
5	North Bhurshi
6	Maitla

== Education ==
According to the 2011 Bangladeshi census, Kelishahar Union had a literacy rate of 51.7%.
