= Saranangkar Thera =

Bangladeshi Buddhist monk

Dutanga Bhante Ven. Saranangkar Thera
- ধুতাঙ্গ ভান্তে ভদন্ত শরণংকর থের
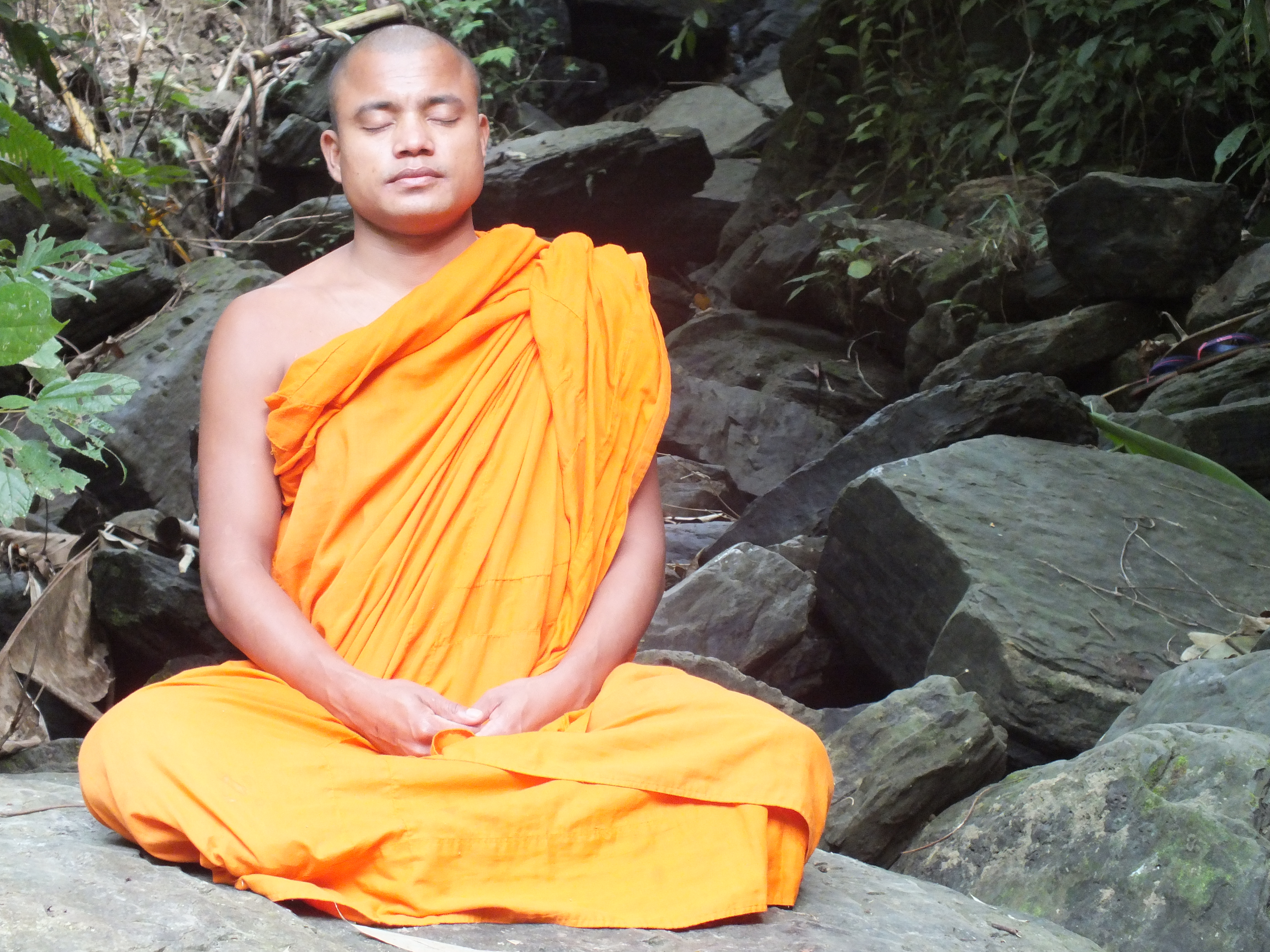
- Born: Rony Barua; August 16, 1984 (age 42)
- Other names: Saranangkar Thero, Sarangankar Bhikkhu, Saranankar Bhikkhu, Saranankar Thero, Sharanangkar Thero, Bhante Sharanangkar Thero, Venerable Saranankar Mahathera
- Occupations: Monk, preacher, activist
- Years active: 2004–present

Dutanga bhante Saranankar Mohathera (Bengali: শরণংকর মহাথেরো) is a Bangladeshi Buddhist monk, preacher, Buddhist rights activist, and the chief abbot of the Gayanasarana Buddhist Forest Monastery, in Rangunia, southeastern Chittagong District.

== Life ==
He was born on 16 August 1984 in the village of Madarsha, Hathazari under the Chattogram district in Bangladesh. He was born in the house of Nagendra Master. Thera's birth name was Rony Barua. He grew up in Rangunia. He took monastic order on 24 October 2004 at the age of twenty.

On 1 January 2006, he moved to "West Adharmanik Sukhananda Bihar" after spending three years there. Even in the monastic life of Bihar, he secretly observed some dhutangashila experimentally. Then, after spending three years in the monastery, he went to the "West Adharmanik North Gujarat Cemetery" to observe the best Shil Dhutangshil, praised by the Buddha, for the purpose of fulfilling the Parmisambhara. He stayed in this crematorium for more than a year and meditated in 16 crematoriums in different upazilas.

He covered a total distance of around 7000 km traveled on foot from 17 February 2011 to 3 August 2020 to attend Dhamma Discourses program for the propagation of Buddhism in Bangladesh and India.

=== Assassination attempts ===
Thera has been subject to multiple assassination attempts. In July 2020, the local terrorist forces carried out an attack on Thera. The attack and acts of violence against the monks were carried out in front of police and apparently with the support of a member of the local ruling party.

After terroristic attacks on him and his shrines, Thera appealed to the Prime Minister of Bangladesh for protection remedial action.

==== Protests ====
There have been numerous protests on both a national and international level, condemning the life-threatening attacks on Thera, and efforts to demolish the Buddhist shrines run by him. Protests have taken place in Boston, held by the expatriate Bangladeshi Buddhist community living in the United States. There have also been protests and demonstrations in New York City, held by the United States Hindu Buddhist Christian Unity Council and the Bangladesh Hindu Coalition.

== Controversies and lawsuits ==
=== Fake accusations ===
On 10 July 2020, a fake Facebook account using Thera's image posted disparaging remarks about Islam and incited conflict between the Muslim majority and the Buddhist minority.

He has been the subject of a series of multiple lawsuits, filed by the "Forest Department" and by the Muslim, Hindu, and Buddhist communities for allegedly "hurting religious sentiments."

He has also been accused by leaders of Hindu organizations for allegedly "occupying ancient crematoriums of the Hindu community." He has also issued legal notices to Sarangankar Bhikkhu and his lawyer for allegedly interfering with the freedom of the media.

Thera denies all the allegations against him.
