= Kodala Union =

Coordinates: 22.4456°N 92.1062°E

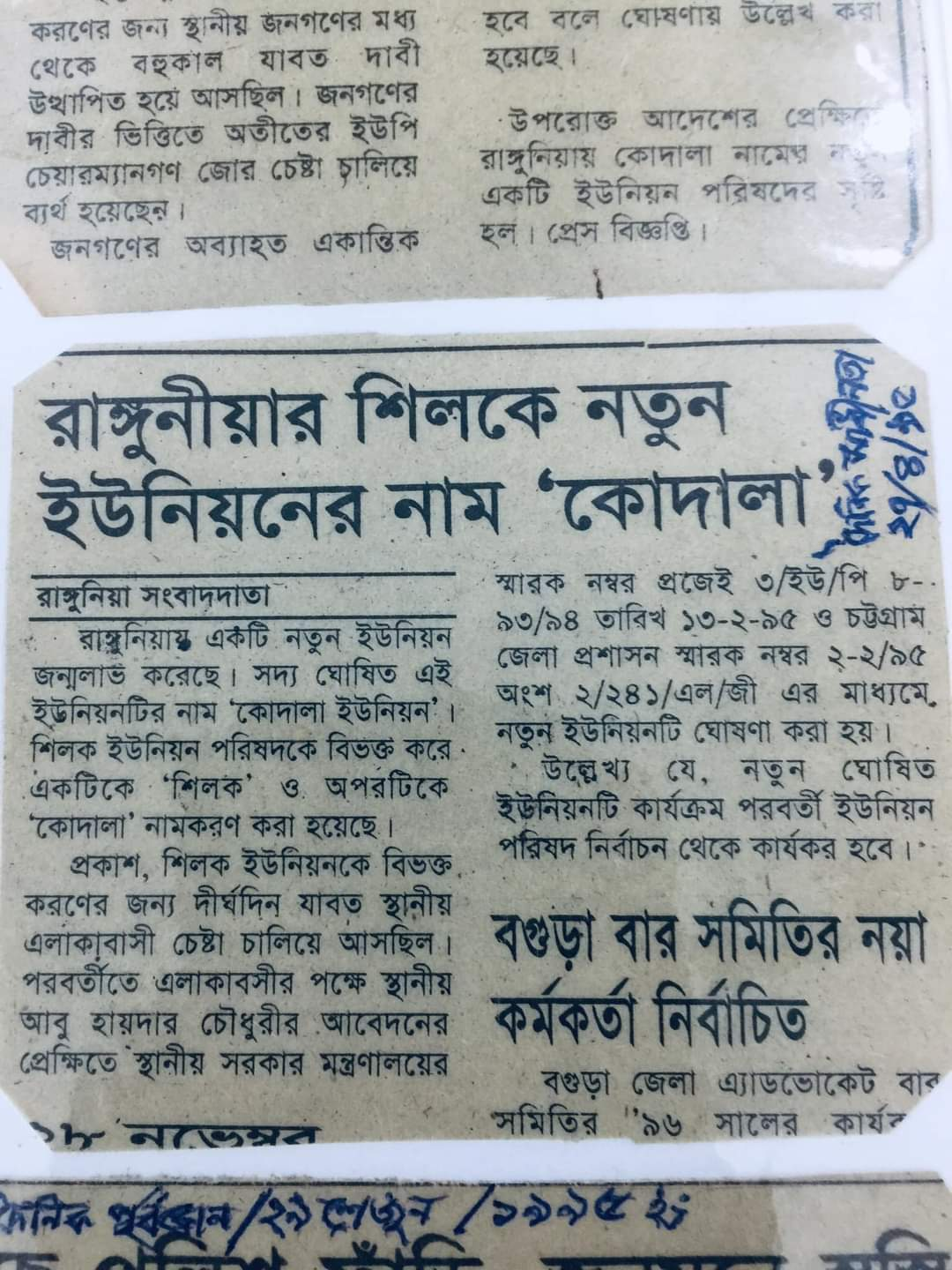
History of Kodala Union Establishment

Kodala Union is a union in Rangunia Upazila, Bangladesh.
