= Hashimpur Union =

Union of Chandanaish Upazila, Chittagong District, Bangladesh

Hashimpur Union হাশিমপুর ইউনিয়ন
- Union
- Location in Bangladesh
- Coordinates: 22°12.5′N 92°2′E
- Country: Bangladesh
- Division: Chittagong Division
- District: Chittagong District
- Upazilas: Chandanaish Upazila

Government
  - Chairman: Vacant

Area
  - Total: 27.66 km^{2} (10.68 sq mi)

Population (2011)
  - Total: 21,941
- Time zone: UTC+6 (BST)
- Postal code: 4381
- Website: hashimpurup.chattogram.gov.bd

Hashimpur Union (Bengali: হাশিমপুর ইউনিয়ন) is a union, the smallest administrative body of Bangladesh, located in Chandanaish Upazila, Chittagong District, Bangladesh. The total population is 21,941.

== Area ==
The area of Hashimpur Union is 6,835 acres (27.66 square kilometers).

== Demographics ==
According to the 2011 Bangladeshi census, Hashimpur Union had a population of 21,941, of which 11,249 were males and 10,692 were females. The total number of households was 4,139.

== Geography ==
Hashimpur Union is located in the central part of Chandanaish Upazila, approximately 3 kilometres from the upazila headquarters. It is bounded to the north by Kanchanabad Union, to the west by Chandanaiish Municipality and Satbaria Union, to the south by Dohazari Municipality, and to the east by Dhopachhari Union and Kanchanabad Union.

== Administration ==
Hashimpur Union is the 8th Union Parishad under Chandanaish Upazila. The administrative activities of the union fall under the jurisdiction of Chandanaiish Thana. It is part of Chittagong-14 (Constituency 291) of the National Parliament of Bangladesh. The villages in the union, organized by ward, are as follows:

Villages
Ward No.	Village name
1st Ward	Uttar Hashimpur
2nd Ward	Uttar Hashimpur
3rd Ward	Uttar Hashimpur
4th Ward	Moddhom Hashimpur
5th Ward	Moddhom Hashimpur
6th Ward	Dokkhin Hashimpur
7th Ward	Dokkhin Hashimpur
8th Ward	Dokkhin Hashimpur
9th Ward	Dokkhin Hashimpur

== Education ==
According to the 2011 Bangladeshi census, Hashimpur Union had a literacy rate of 46.9%.
