= Aimachhara Union =

Union of Rangamati District, Chittagong, Bangladesh

Aimachhara আইমাছড়া
- Union
- Interactive map of Aimachhara
- Country: Bangladesh
- Division: Chittagong Division
- District: Rangamati District
- Upazila: Barkal Upazila

Area
  - Total: 139.29 km^{2} (53.78 sq mi)

Population (2022)
  - Total: 7,539
  - Density: 54.12/km^{2} (140.2/sq mi)
- Time zone: UTC+6 (BST)
- Postal code: 4570
- Website: aimacharaup.rangamati.gov.bd

Aimachhara Union is a union of Barkal Upazila under Rangamati District.

== Demography ==
According to 2022 census, total population of the Union are 7,539. Among them, 1,095 are Muslim, 6,386 are Buddhist, 56 are Hindu and 2 are Christian.

Religion-2022
1. Buddhism (84.7%)
2. Islam (14.5%)
3. Hinduism (0.74%)
4. Christianity (0.03%)
5. Others (0.00%)

== Ethnicity ==
This Union is home to a variety of different ethnic groups. Among them, 1,376 are Bengali, 6,137 are Chakma and 26 are of others ethnic groups.

Ethnicity-2022
1. Chakma (81.4%)
2. Bengali (18.2%)
3. Others (0.35%)
