= Muzaffarabad massacre =

Muzaffarabad massacre মুজাফফরাবাদ হত্যাকান্ড
- Part of Bangladesh genocide
- Location: Patiya, Chittagong, East Pakistan
- Date: 3 May 1971 (UTC+6:00)
- Target: Bengali Hindus
- Attack type: Mass murder, Massacre
- Weapon: Rifles
- Deaths: More than 300
- Perpetrators: Pakistani Army, Razakars

Muzaffarabad massacre (Bengali: মুজাফফরাবাদ হত্যাকান্ড) was the massacre of the residents of predominantly Hindu village of Muzaffarabad now under Kharna Union of Patiya Upazila in Chittagong District of Bangladesh on 3 May 1971 by the Pakistani army aided by the local collaborators. An estimated 300 Bengali Hindus, from 5 year-old child to 80 years old men and women were killed in the massacre. More than 500 houses were burnt to ashes. According to eyewitnesses, Rameez Ahmed Chowdhury, the then Chairman of Kharna Union, and his aides were responsible for the massacre.

== Background ==
The village of Muzaffarabad is located under the Kharna Union, in the south eastern extremity of Patiya Upazila in Chittagong District. In 1971, Muzaffarabad was one of the many predominantly Hindu villages under Patiya police station. In the 1970 elections, 95% of the voters of Muzaffarabad voted for Awami League. When the army crackdown started on 25 March, many people from Chittagong took shelter at their relative's place in Muzaffarabad. On 16 April, the Pakistani army bombed Patiya and subsequently took control of the southern part of Chittagong district. They camped at Dohazari and Patiya. At Patiya, the Pakistani army camped at the Primary Training Institute. The used to arrest unarmed villagers and torture them at the camp. Many were killed and buried underneath the PTI grounds.

Towards the end of April, the Razakars from Kharna and Elahabad villages targeted the Hindu village for persecution and loot. As the anti-social elements began to be seen frequently in the village, the elders decided to set up a village defence. Twenty camps were set up along the border of the village, each having twenty men for vigil. In the event of an attack, the men in the camp would set an alarm so that men from the other camps can come together to resist the attackers. The all round vigil at the camps helped the villagers foil attacks from the Razakars more than once. Having failed, the Razakars persuaded the Pakistani army at the Dohazari camp to attack Muzaffarabad.

== Events ==
On 3 May, at the onset of dawn at around 5:20 A.M., while the people of Muzaffarabad were still asleep, the Pakistani military and the Razakars surrounded the village from three sides. There was a light drizzle in the morning. At around 7 A.M., the Pakistani army entered the village in military trucks. At around 8 A.M., they began to go from door to door and started killing the villagers.

Seventy-year-old Rajani Sen was reading the Ramayana for the peace and prosperity of the country. When the Pakistani army and the Razakars arrived at his place, he seated them as guests. One of the Razakars asked Sen to say Jai Bangla. As soon as he had uttered Jai Bangla, a Pakistani soldier put the barrel of his rifle into the throat of Sen and shot him to death. Nabin Sadhu, a 75 year-old hermit who was reciting from the Gita was similarly shot to death. The attackers rounded up the priests of the village and force them to break the images they worshipped. After that, the priests were shot to death.

Social worker Nirmal Sen was dragged along with his father Upendralal Sen to a nearby paddy field. There they were tied together with a gamchha and shot to death. Raimohan, a teacher at the Muzaffarabad High School, who had begun fishing in a village pond, was tied within the fish net along with his son and then shot to death.

The villagers who went into hiding, when the Pakistani army launched the killing spree were rounded up the Razakars one by one. In order to test whether they were Hindu or Muslim, the villagers were asked to recite the kalma. When they failed, they were butchered to death in the manner of zabiha.

== Aftermath ==
The killing spree went on till 2 P.M. After the Pakistani army left, the local Razakars looted the remaining houses. Targeted killing continued even after the massacre on 3 May. On 7 or 8 May, Natun Chandra Chaudhuri was brutally beaten to death by few Razakars from Elahabad. A few days later, Baren Ray Chaudhuri, a teacher of the Muzaffarabad High School was killed. He had gone to Joara Munsirhat to buy medicines for his ailing mother. On his way back, he was waylaid and killed by the Razakars near Mohammadpur.

== Memorial ==
Every year the people of Muzaffarabad commemorate 3 May by paying respect to the victims. Lectures, seminars and cultural programmes are held throughout the day in memory of the victims. A new memorial structure has been built in 2010. No initiative has been taken to preserve the mass burial site.

== List of persons killed ==
- Raimohan Biswas (50)
- Pranhari Biswas (52)
- Rajbihari Biswas (44)
- Surabala Chaudhuri (55)
- Dulal Chaudhuri
- Nirmal Sen (45)
- Upendra Sen (70)
- Niranjan Biswas (45)
- Natun Chandra Ghosh (60)
- Rohini Datta (45)
- Anil Chakrabarti
- Rajani Sen (55)
- Nabin Sadhu (75)
- Dhirendra Datta (60)
- Shankar Prasad Sen (50)
- Upendra Kar (45)
- Mahendra Chaudhuri (65)
- Jatindra Das (40)
- Surendra Sen
- Dipak Sen
- Nikunja Das
- Ashwini Das
- Banamali Das
- Upendralal Chaudhuri
- Barin Chowdhury
