= Satbaria Union, Chandanaish =

Union of Chandanaish Upazila, Chittagong District, Bangladesh

Satbaria Union সাতবাড়িয়া ইউনিয়ন
- Union
- Location in Bangladesh
- Coordinates: 22°10.5′N 92°1.5′E
- Country: Bangladesh
- Division: Chittagong Division
- District: Chittagong District
- Upazilas: Chandanaish Upazila

Government
  - Chairman: Vacant

Area
  - Total: 11.65 km^{2} (4.50 sq mi)

Population (2011)
  - Total: 24,327
- Time zone: UTC+6 (BST)
- Postal code: 4383
- Website: satbariaup.chattogram.gov.bd

Satbaria Union (Bengali: সাতবাড়িয়া ইউনিয়ন) is a union, the smallest administrative body of Bangladesh, located in Chandanaish Upazila, Chittagong District, Bangladesh. The total population is 24,327.

== Area ==
The area of Satbaria Union is 2,879 acres (11.65 square kilometres).

== Demographics ==
According to the 2011 Bangladeshi census, Satbaria Union had a population of 24,327, of which 11,786 were males and 12,541 were females. The total number of households was 4,652.

== Geography ==
Satbaria Union is located in the southern part of Chandanaish Upazila, approximately 8 kilometres from the upazila headquarters. It is bounded to the east by Dohazari Municipality and Hashimpur Union, to the north by Hashimpur Union and Chandanaiish Municipality, to the west by Chandanaiish Municipality and Barama Union, and to the south by Bailtali Union, Khagaria Union of Satkania Upazila, and Dohazari Municipality.

== Administration ==
Satbaria Union is the 7th Union Parishad under Chandanaish Upazila. The administrative activities of the union fall under the jurisdiction of Chandanaiish Thana. It is part of Chittagong-14 (Constituency 291) of the National Parliament of Bangladesh. The villages in the union are as follows:

Villages
| No. | Village name |
|---|---|
| 1 | Satbaria |
| 2 | Hasnandandi |
| 3 | Mohammad Khali |

== Education ==
According to the 2011 Bangladeshi census, Satbaria Union had a literacy rate of 49.8%.
