= BGC Trust Medical College =

Medical college in Chittagong, Bangladesh

- বিজিসি ট্রাস্ট মেডিকেল কলেজ
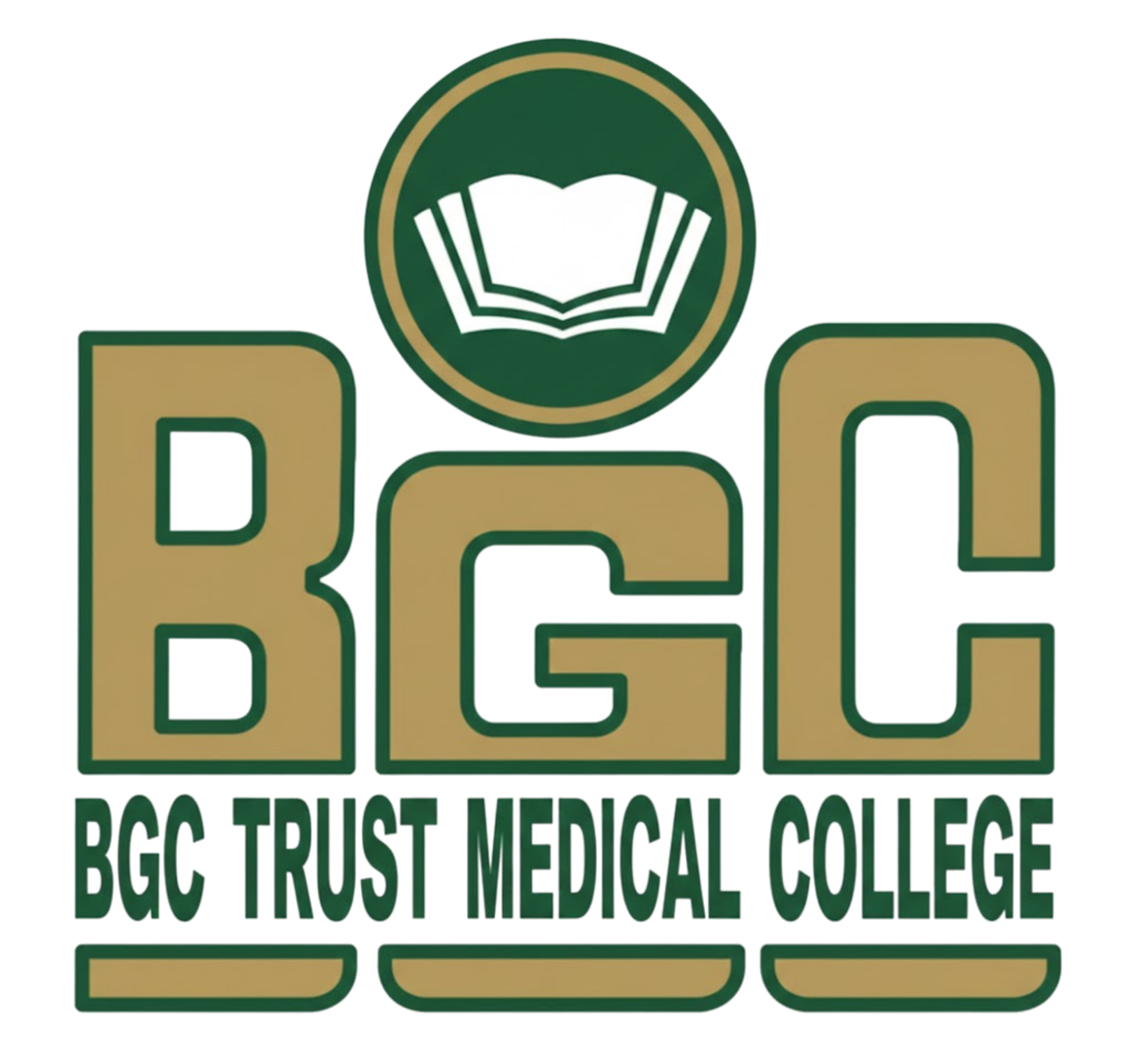
- Other name: BGCTMC
- Type: Private medical school
- Established: 2002; 24 years ago
- Academic affiliations: Chittagong Medical University
- Chairman: Engineer Afsar Uddin Ahmad
- Principal: Prof. Dr. Arup Dutta
- Students: 600
- Location: Chandanaish, Chittagong, Bangladesh
- Campus: Urban
- Language: English
- Website: URL

BGC Trust Medical College, abbreviated as BGCTMC is a private medical college located in Chandanaish, Chittagong, Bangladesh. It is affiliated with the Chittagong Medical University.

== History ==
BGC Trust Medical Medical was established in 2002 at Chandanaish, Chattogram.

== Course ==
MBBS degree of BGC Trust Medical College is affiliated under Chittagong Medical University. Many foreign students also study there.

== Facilities ==
There is a hostel for female students named "Mother Teresa Girl's Hostel. They have their own transport system for students coming from Chittagong City. It has a modern library with 6674 books. There are also canteens and well equipped tutorial rooms, classrooms, laboratories, and dissection rooms.
