= Subalong Union =

Union of Rangamati District, Chittagong, Bangladesh

Subalong সুবলং
- Union
- Interactive map of Subalong
- Country: Bangladesh
- Division: Chittagong Division
- District: Rangamati District
- Upazila: Barkal Upazila

Area
  - Total: 124.32 km^{2} (48.00 sq mi)

Population (2022)
  - Total: 11,986
  - Density: 96.412/km^{2} (249.71/sq mi)
- Time zone: UTC+6 (BST)
- Postal code: 4570
- Website: subalongup.rangamati.gov.bd

Subalong Union is a union of Barkal Upazila under Rangamati District.

== Demography ==
According to 2022 census, total population of the Union are 11,986. Among them, 2,484 are Muslim, 9,345 are Buddhist, 150 are Hindu, 7 are Christian and 4 follow others religion.

Religion-2022
1. Buddhism (78.0%)
2. Islam (20.7%)
3. Hinduism (1.25%)
4. Christianity (0.06%)
5. Others (0.00%)

== Ethnicity ==
This Union is home to a variety of different ethnic groups. Among them, 3,428 are Bengali, 8,486 are Chakma and 62 are of others ethnic groups.

Ethnicity-2022
1. Chakma (70.8%)
2. Bengali (28.6%)
3. Others (0.60%)
