= Shilok Union =

Coordinates: 22.4440°N 92.0726°E

Shilak Union (Bengali: শিলক ইউনিয়ন) is a union parishad under Rangunia Upazila of Chittagong District in the Chittagong Division of southeastern Bangladesh.

== Geography ==
The village is situated on the bank of Karnaphuli river and this is north side of village and east side Kodhala, south side Padhua, west side Sarafbhata.

== Demographics ==
According to the 2011 Bangladesh census, Shilok Union had 3,744 households and a population of 18,009. The literacy rate (age 7 and over) was 50.8%, compared to the national average of 51.8%. 57.9% of the employed population was engaged in agricultural work.

== Administration ==
- Member of parliament: Dr. Hasan Mahamud
- UP Chairman: Mohammed Nazrul Islam Talukdar
- Union Parishad Chairman profile: https://shilokup.chittagong.gov.bd/bn/site/officer_list/qXKz-মোহাম্মদ-নজরুল-ইসলাম-তালুকদার

== Education ==
M. Shah Alam Chowdhury Degree College is the only degree college in the union. South Rangunia Shilak Girls' College is the only other college in the union. There are four secondary schools in the union: Shilak Hamid Sharif Girls' High School, South Rangunia Shilok M. L. High School, South Shilok M. Shah Alam Chowdhury High School, and West Shilak Badoura Alam Chowdhury High School.
