= Chandanaish =

Chandanaish চন্দনাইশ
- Town and Municipality
- Location in Bangladesh
- Coordinates: 22°12′N 92°0.5′E
- Country: Bangladesh
- Division: Chittagong Division
- District: Chittagong District
- Upazila: Chandanaish Upazila

Government
  - Type: Municipality
  - Body: Chandanaish Municipality

Area
  - Land: 26.8 km^{2} (10.3 sq mi)

Population (2011)
  - Total: 35,248
  - Density: 1,320/km^{2} (3,410/sq mi)
- Time zone: UTC+6 (BST)

Chandanaish Municipality mahallah geocode map

Chandanaish (Bengali: চন্দনাইশ) is a town in Chittagong District in the division of Chittagong, Bangladesh. It is the administrative headquarter and urban centre of Chandanaish Upazila.
