= Betagi Union =

Betagi বেতাগী
- Union
- Location in Bangladesh
- Coordinates: 22°28′N 92°5′E
- Country: Bangladesh
- Division: Chittagong Division
- District: Chittagong District
- Upazila: Rangunia Upazila

Area
  - Total: 17 km^{2} (6.6 sq mi)

Population (1991)
  - Total: 9,000
  - Density: 530/km^{2} (1,400/sq mi)
- Time zone: UTC+6 (BST)
- Website: Official Map of Rangunia

Betagi (Bengali: বেতাগী) is a union parishad of Rangunia Upazila in Chittagong District, Chittagong Division, Bangladesh.

== Geography ==
Betagi is a union of Rangunia Upazila, situated on the bank of Karnaphuli river, area 4378 acres, located in between 22°28' north latitudes and in between 91°5' east longitudes. The Karnaphuli flows down the east and south side beside Betagi. In the east side of Betagi is Sarafbhata Union, in the west side is Bagoan Union of Raozan Upazila, in the north side is Pomra Union and in the west side is Jaishtapura Union of Boalkhali Upazila.

== Administration ==
The UP chairman of Betagi is Md. Sofiul Alam Sofi

Betagi has 16 mauzas and 40 villages. The 16 mauzas are Antorghona, Baniakhola, Betagi-1, Betagi-2, Betagi-3, Betagi-4, Betagi-5, Betagi-6, Chengkhali-1, Chengkhali-2, Dhemirchora, Dingollonga-1, Dingollonga-2, Gungunia Betagi, Kaukhali, and Tinchowdia.

== See also ==
- Betagi Upazila
