= Bhushanchhara Union =

Union of Rangamati District, Chittagong, Bangladesh

Bhushanchhara ভূষনছড়া
- Union
- Interactive map of Bhushanchhara
- Country: Bangladesh
- Division: Chittagong Division
- District: Rangamati District
- Upazila: Barkal Upazila

Area
  - Total: 199.43 km^{2} (77.00 sq mi)

Population (2022)
  - Total: 17,046
  - Density: 85.474/km^{2} (221.38/sq mi)
- Time zone: UTC+6 (BST)
- Postal code: 4570
- Website: bushancharaup.rangamati.gov.bd

Bhushanchhara Union is a union of Barkal Upazila under Rangamati District.

== Demography ==
According to 2022 census, total population of the Union are 17,046. Among them, 5,716 are Muslim, 11,213 are Buddhist, 104 are Hindu, 9 are Christian and 4 follow others religion.

Religion-2022
1. Buddhism (65.8%)
2. Islam (33.5%)
3. Hinduism (0.61%)
4. Christianity (0.05%)
5. Others (0.02%)

== Ethnicity ==
This Union is home to a variety of different ethnic groups. Among them, 6,829 are Bengali, 9,985 are Chakma, 186 are Marma and 46 are of others ethnic groups.

Ethnicity-2022
1. Chakma (58.6%)
2. Bengali (40.1%)
3. Marma (1.09%)
4. Others (0.27%)
