= Pomara, Bangladesh =

Pomra পোমরা
- Location in Bangladesh
- Coordinates: 22.470°N 92.012°E
- Country: Bangladesh
- Division: Chittagong Division
- District: Chittagong District
- Time zone: UTC+6 (BST)
- Postal code: 4360

Pomra (Bengali: পোমরা) is a village of Rangunia Upazila at Chittagong District in the Division of Chittagong, Bangladesh.

== Geography ==
Pomra is located at 22.470°N 92.012°E

== Education ==
There is one intermediate college in the village, Syeda Selima Qader Chowdhury Degree College. There is four secondary school, Pomara High School, founded in 1928, Pomara Bangabandhu High School, founded in 1992, Uttor pomara high school & Shohid Jia High School. The madrasa education system includes one fazil madrasa, Pomra Jameul Ulum Fazil Madrasah.

== See also ==
- List of villages in Bangladesh
