= Rangunia =

Rangunia রাঙ্গুনিয়া
- Town and Municipality
- Location in Bangladesh
- Coordinates: 22°27′57.9″N 92°02′48.8″E
- Country: Bangladesh
- Division: Chittagong Division
- District: Chittagong District
- Upazila: Rangunia Upazila
- Municipality established: 4 July 2000

Government
  - Type: Municipality
  - Body: Rangunia Municipality

Area
  - Land: 15.4 km^{2} (5.9 sq mi)

Population (2001)
  - Total: 23,036
  - Density: 1,500/km^{2} (3,870/sq mi)
- Time zone: UTC+6 (BST)

Rangunia Municipality mahallah geocode map

Rangunia is a town in Chittagong District in the division of Chittagong. It is the administrative headquarters and urban centre of Rangunia Upazila.
