= Chandanaish Upazila =

Upazila in Chattogram Division, Bangladesh

Chandanaish চন্দনাইশ
- Upazila
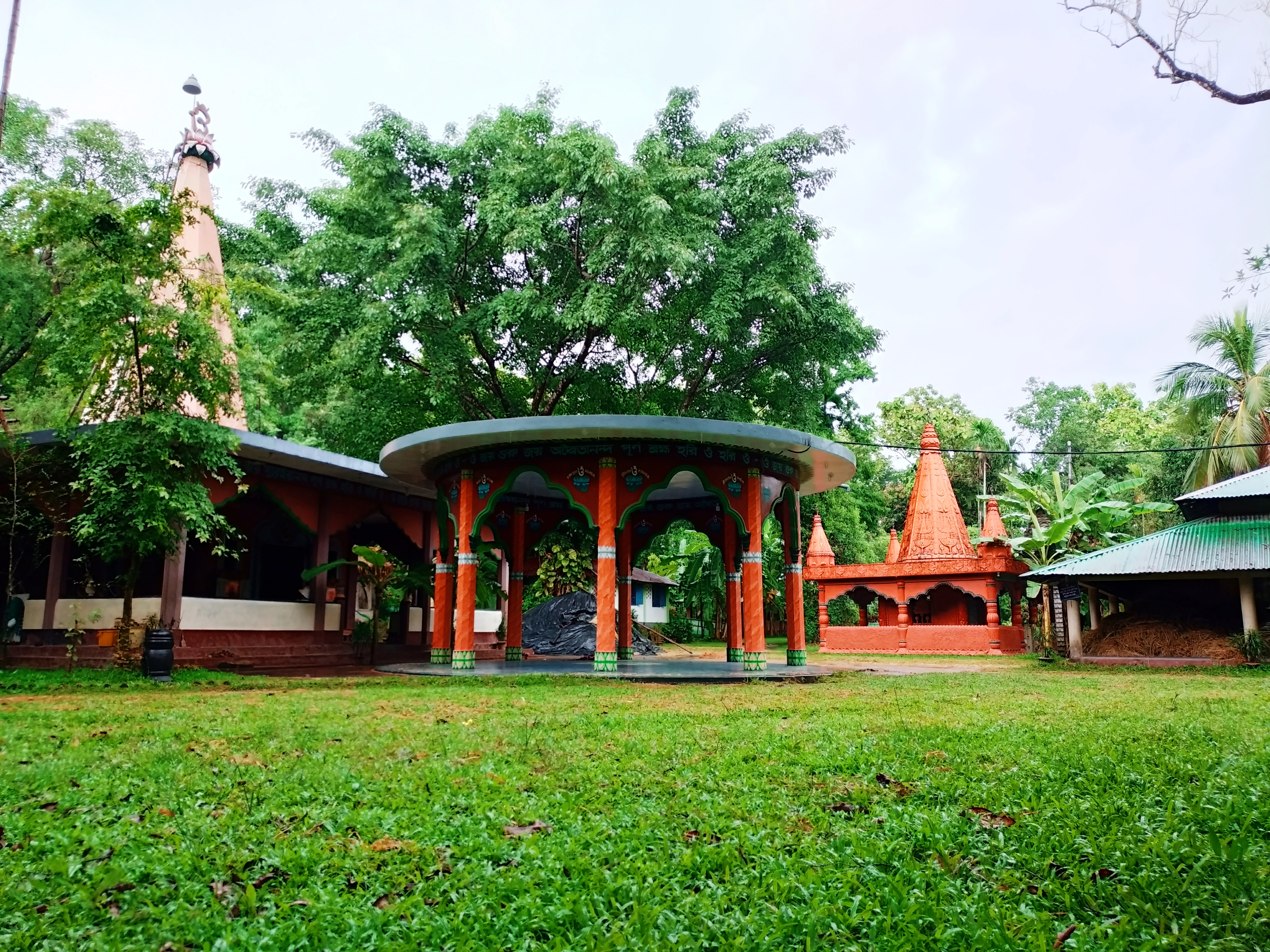
- Central Tapoban Ashram, Dohazari

- Coordinates: 22°12.7′N 92°2.5′E
- Country: Bangladesh
- Division: Chittagong
- District: Chittagong
- Jatiya Sangsad constituency: Chittagong-14
- Headquarters: Chandanaish Upazila Complex

Government
  - Body: Upazila Council
  - MP: Vacant
  - Chairman: Kamela Khanam (Acting)

Area
  - Total: 201.99 km^{2} (77.99 sq mi)

Population (2022)
  - Total: 252,242
  - Density: 1,248.8/km^{2} (3,234.3/sq mi)
- Time zone: UTC+6 (BST)
- Postal code: 4380
- Area code: 03033
- Website: chandanaish.gov.bd

Chandanaish Upazila mauza geocode map

Chandanaish (Bengali: চন্দনাইশ) is an upazila of Chattogram District in Chattogram Division, Bangladesh.

== History ==
Chandanaish is one of the first inhabitant of the early settlers of Chittagong. Muslim traders and preachers from the then Islamic worlds had been settling in Chandanaish due to the close proximity of Chandanaish from the river Karnaphuli. However, the Muslim settlement was permanently established when the medieval Islamic invasion occurred in Chittagong.

Chandanaish was previously part of Patiya upazila. In 1976, Chandanaish was separated from Patiya and established as Chandanaish thana and in 1983 it became an upazila.

== Geography ==
Chandanaish is located at 22.2111°N 92.0417°E. It has 44,438 households and a total area of 201.99 km^{2}. Its west side is plainland and its east side is surrounded with the tertiary hill tracts. Here cultivable land is very fertile. Sangu is the main river but there are also small rivers and canals like Borumoti (Borguni Khal locally called), Chandkhali river etc. There are a lot of Beels such as Moga Beel, Arah Beel, Ronger Beel.

== Demographics ==
Religions in Chandanaish Upazila (2022)
Religion	Percent
Islam	87.30%
Hinduism	10.63%
Buddhism	1.81%
Other or not stated	0.26%

According to the 2022 Bangladeshi census, Chandanaish Upazila had 56,197 households and a population of 252,242. 10.53% of the population were under 5 years of age. Chandanaish had a literacy rate (age 7 and over) of 79.69%: 80.83% for males and 78.68% for females, and a sex ratio of 90.54 males for every 100 females. 81,713 (32.39%) lived in urban areas.

As of the 2011 Census of Bangladesh, Chandanaish upazila had 44,438 households and a population of 233,017. 55,629 (23.87%) were under 10 years of age. Chandanaish had an average literacy rate of 53.61%, compared to the national average of 51.8%, and a sex ratio of 985 females per 1000 males. 35,248 (15.13%) of the population lived in urban areas. Ethnic population was 968 (0.42%) of the population.

According to the 1991 Bangladesh census, Chandanaish had a population of 172,843. Males constituted 51.27% of the population, and females 48.73%. The population aged 18 or over was 81,653. Chandanaish had an average literacy rate of 33.9% (7+ years), compared to the national average of 32.4%.

== Administration ==
Chandanaish Upazila is divided into Chandanaish Municipality, Dohazari Municipality, and nine union parishads: Bailtali, Barama, Barkal, Dhopachhari, Dohazari, Hashimpur, Joara, Kanchanabad, and Satbaria. The union parishads are subdivided into 44 mauzas and 46 villages.

Chandanaish Municipality is subdivided into 9 wards and 12 mahallas.

MP: Vacant

Upazila Chairman: Vacant Vice Chairman: Vacant

Female V. Chairman: Vacant

== Infrastructure ==
=== Health ===
Chandnaish upazila has 2 hospitals, 2 upazila health complexes, 5 union health centers, 10 family planning centers and 10 community clinics.

=== Communication ===
The main communication road in Chandanish Upazila is Chittagong-Cox's Bazar highway. This upazila can be contacted over Barkal Bridge of Chittagong-Anwara District. Can be contacted by various types of vehicles. In addition, this upazila has 91 kilometres (57 mi) of paved roads, 450 kilometres (280 mi) of semi-pacara roads, 700 kilometres (430 mi) of unpaved roads. This upazila also has rail communication system. There is also a communication system with other upazilas through Sangu river.

== Education ==
Universities

- BGC Trust University Bangladesh (BGCTUB)

Medical colleges

- BGC Trust Medical College

Colleges

- BGC Trust Academy (School & College)
- Gachhbaria Govt. College
- Barama Degree College
- Amanatsafa Badrunnesa Mohila College
- Satbaria Oli Ahmad Bir Bikram College
- Begum Gul Chemanara Academy

High schools

- Gachhbaria Nityananda Gaurochandra Govt. Model High School(1918)
- Gachhbaria Mamtaz Begum High School
- Fatema Jinnah Girls' High School
- Satbaria High School
- East Satbaria High School
- Bailtali High School
- Jafarabad High School
- Barama Trahi Menaka High School (1925)
- Joara B. Chowdhury High School
- Barkal SZ High School
- Shuchia High School
- Kanchanabad High School
- Kashem Mahbub High School
- Jamijuri Boys' School
- (Hashimpur M.A.K.U High School)
- Khandighi M.L. High School
- Patandondy High School
- Keshua High School

Madrasahs

- Hashimpur Mokbuliya Fazil Madrasah
- Jafarabad Fazil Madrasah
- Joara Islamia Fazil Madrasah
- Elahabad Ahmadiyya Sunniyya Fazil Madrasah
- Jamijuri Sunniyya Madrasah
- Abu Mariam Mahila Madrasah
- Late Sona Meah Choudory Senior Madrasah
- Hashimpur Bhandari Para Dakhil Madrasah
- Satbaria Baro Awlia Alim Madrasah
- Rahmania Ahmadia A.S. Sunnia Dakhil Madrasah (South Gachbari Dakhil Madrasah)

Others

- Jamalur Rahman Khan Science-Technology School & College (Jamijuri Technical School and College)
- Alhaz Nurul Islam Pre-cadet School
- Mozaher Para BRAC School, Hashimpur
- Kanaimadary Junior high school

== Notable persons ==
- Maniruzzaman Islamabadi – a notable politician, and religious reformer in British India
- Hossain Zillur Rahman – economist, advisor to caretaker government of Bangladesh
- Colonel (Rtd) Oli Ahmad Bir Bikram – Member of Parliament, president of Liberal Democratic Party
- Md. Nazrul Islam Chowdhury – Member of Parliament
- Nurul Islam – physician, National Professor of Bangladesh
- Ahmed Sofa, writer, was born at Gachbaria in 1943.
- Advocate Subrata Chowdhury, Freedom Fighter, Senior Advocate, Supreme Court of Bangladesh, Vice President Gono Forum

== See also ==
- Upazilas of Bangladesh
- Districts of Bangladesh
- Divisions of Bangladesh
