= Barkal Union, Barkal =

Union of Rangamati District, Chittagong, Bangladesh

Barkal বরকল
- Union
- Interactive map of Barkal
- Country: Bangladesh
- Division: Chittagong Division
- District: Rangamati District
- Upazila: Barkal Upazila

Area
  - Total: 137.27 km^{2} (53.00 sq mi)

Population (2022)
  - Total: 7,266
  - Density: 52.93/km^{2} (137.1/sq mi)
- Time zone: UTC+6 (BST)
- Postal code: 4570
- Website: barkalup.rangamati.gov.bd

Barkal Union is a union of Barkal Upazila under Rangamati District.

== Demography ==
According to 2022 census, total population of the Union are 7,266. Among them, 1,890 are Muslim, 5,181 are Buddhist, 116 are Hindu, 77 are Christian and 2 follow others religion.

Religion-2022
1. Buddhism (71.3%)
2. Islam (26.0%)
3. Hinduism (1.60%)
4. Christianity (1.06%)
5. Others (0.03%)

== Ethnicity ==
This Union is home to a variety of different ethnic groups. Among them, 2,497 are Bengali, 4,428 are Chakma, 221 are Marma and 120 are of others ethnic groups.

Ethnicity-2022
1. Chakma (60.9%)
2. Bengali (34.4%)
3. Marma (3.04%)
4. Others (1.65%)
