= Barkal Upazila =

Barkal বরকল
- Upazila
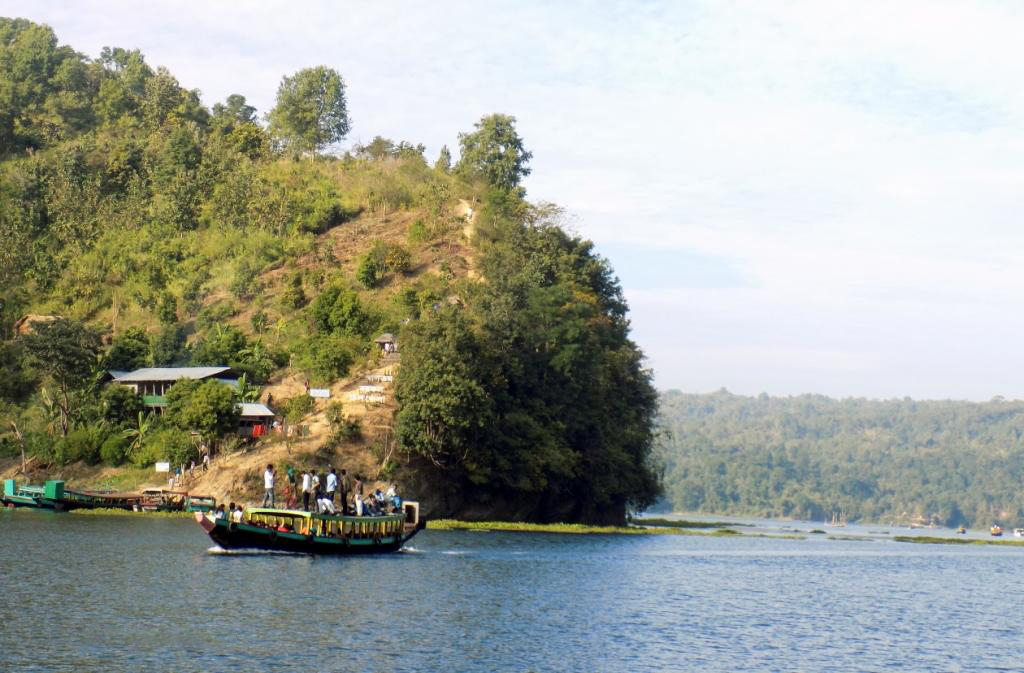
- Kaptai Lake, Barkal

- Coordinates: 22°44′N 92°21.5′E
- Country: Bangladesh
- Division: Chittagong
- District: Rangamati

Area
  - Total: 760.89 km^{2} (293.78 sq mi)

Population (2022)
  - Total: 49,708
  - Density: 65.329/km^{2} (169.20/sq mi)
- Time zone: UTC+6 (BST)
- Postal code: 4570
- Website: Official Map of Barkal

Barkal Upazila mauza geocode map

Barkal (Bengali: বরকল) is an upazila (sub-district) of Rangamati District in the Division of Chittagong, Bangladesh. Tribal people call it as Borhol বড়হল .

== Geography ==
Barkal is located at 22.7333°N 92.3583°E. It has a total area of 760.89 km^{2}. Barkal upazila is bordered by Bagaichhari upazila to the north, Langadu and Rangamati Sadar upazilas to the west, Juraichhari upazila to the south, and the Indian state of Mizoram to the east.

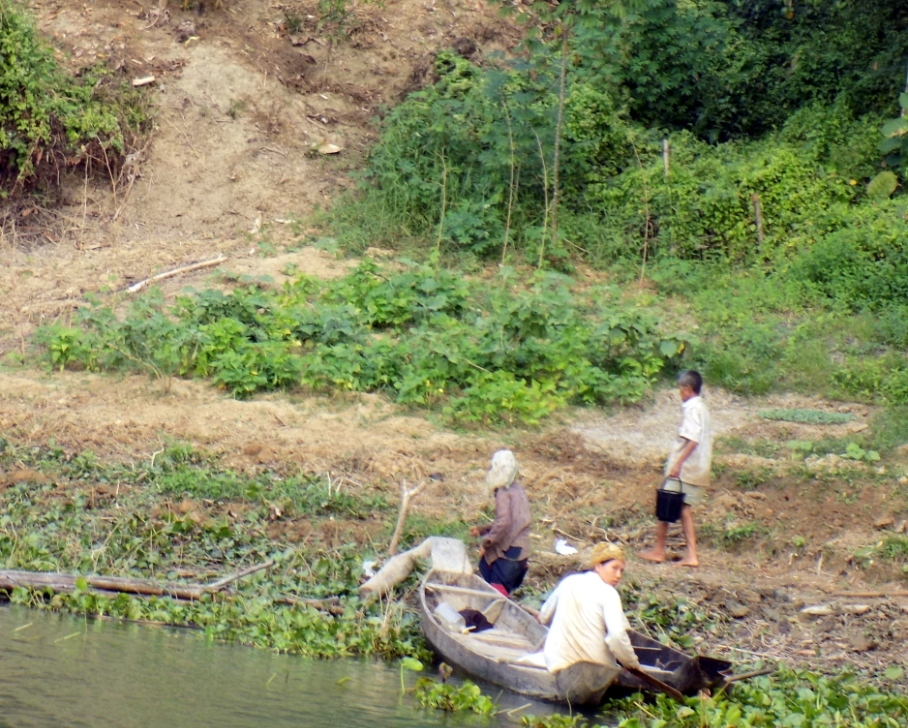
Females are more active in household work and cultivation

== Demographics ==
According to the 2022 Bangladeshi census, Barkal Upazila had 11,242 households and a population of 49,708. 8.40% of the population were under 5 years of age. Barkal had a literacy rate (age 7 and over) of 70.15%: 79.48% for males and 59.77% for females, and a sex ratio of 110.36 males for every 100 females. 13,339 (26.83%) lived in urban areas.

=== Ethnicity and religion ===
Religions in Barkal Upazila (2022)
Religion	Percent
Buddhism	75.81%
Islam	22.74%
Hinduism	0.87%
Christianity	0.55%
Other or not stated	0.02%

Population by religion in Union
Union	Muslim	Buddhist	Others
Aimachhara	1,095	6,386	58
Bara Harina	120	5,560	190
Barkal	1,890	5,181	195
Bhushanchhara	5,716	11,213	117
Subalong	2,484	9,345	157

🟨 Buddhist majority

As of the 2022 Bangladeshi census, Barkal upazila had a population of 49,708. The ethnic population was 35,315 (71.04%), of which Chakma were 34,462 and Marma 436 and Pankhoa 208.

Ethnicity in the Barkal Upazila (2022)
1. Chakma (69.3%)
2. Bengali (29.0%)
3. Marma (0.88%)
4. Pankhoa (0.42%)
5. Others (0.41%)

Population by ethnicity in Union
Union	Bengali	Chakma	Others
Aimachhara	1,376	6,137	26
Bara Harina	362	5,426	182
Barkal	2,497	4,428	441
Bhushanchhara	6,829	9,985	232
Subalong	3,428	8,486	62

🟨 Chakma majority

== Administration ==
UNO: Arafat Mohammad Noman.

Barkal Upazila is divided into five union parishads: Aimachhara, Bara Harina, Barkal, Bhushanchhara and Subalong. The union parishads are subdivided into 28 mauzas and 180 villages.

Subalong Union is known for its waterfalls and the natural environment of Kaptai Lake. Barkal Union is situated on the banks of the Karnafuli River.

== See also ==
- Upazilas of Bangladesh
- Districts of Bangladesh
- Divisions of Bangladesh
