= Kachuai Union =

Union of Patia Upazila, Chittagong District, Bangladesh

Kachuai Union কচুয়াই ইউনিয়ন
- Union Council
- No. 16 Kachuai Union Parishad
- Location within Chittagong division Location within Bangladesh
- Coordinates: 22°16′49″N 92°01′25″E
- Country: Bangladesh
- Division: Chittagong
- District: Chittagong
- Upazila: Patiya

Government
  - Chairman: SM Inzamul Haque Jasim

Area
  - Total: 59.84 km^{2} (23.10 sq mi)
- Elevation: 12 m (39 ft)

Population (2011)
  - Total: 24,344
  - Density: 406.8/km^{2} (1,054/sq mi)
- Time zone: UTC+6 (BST)
- Postal code: 4370

Kachuai (Bengali: কচুয়াই) is a union council of Patiya Upaila, Chittagong District, Chittagong Division, Bangladesh. It shares a border with Patiya Municipality and Haidgaon Union in its north, Dhopachhari Union in its east, Kanchanabad Union and Kharana Union in its south, as well as Chhanhara Union and Bhatikhain Union in its west. In the year 2011, the union has a total population of 24,344.

== Demographics ==
According to the 2011 Census of Bangladesh, Kachuai Union has a population of 24,344, of which 12,216 are male and 12,128 are female. There are 4,704 households within the union. The overall literacy rate is 52.9%, with 54.1% of the male population being literate and 51.7% of the female being literate.

== Government ==
Kachuai is the 16th union council under Patiya Upazila. The administrative activities of Kachuai Union are under the supervision of Patiya Thana. In addition, it is within the Chittagong-12 Constituency No. 289 of Jatiya Sangsad.

== Administrative structure ==
In 2011 six villages were under the union, all of them listed as follows:

Village	Population (2011)
Azimpur	5,198
Kachuai	9,523
Katha	3,382
Lot 75 Sreemai	155
Parigram	2,298
Sreemai	3,788

== Places of interest ==
Attractions in Kachuai Union includes:

- Kachuai Kala Mosque
- Hatiyardeva Hills

== Education ==
As of 2011 there were 2 high schools and 8 public primary schools within the union. As for the religious schools, there are 3 senior madrasas and 16 forkaniya madrasas.

== See also ==
- Patiya Upazila
- Chittagong District
