= Barkal Union, Chandanaish =

Union of Chandanaish Upazila, Chittagong District, Bangladesh

Barkal Union বরকল ইউনিয়ন
- Union
- Location in Bangladesh
- Coordinates: 22°12′N 91°58′E
- Country: Bangladesh
- Division: Chittagong Division
- District: Chittagong District
- Upazilas: Chandanaish Upazila

Government
  - Chairman: Vacant

Area
  - Total: 25.32 km^{2} (9.78 sq mi)

Population (2011)
  - Total: 20,460
- Time zone: UTC+6 (BST)
- Postal code: 4383
- Website: barkalup.chattogram.gov.bd

Barkal Union (Bengali: বরকল ইউনিয়ন) is a union, the smallest administrative body of Bangladesh, located in Chandanaish Upazila, Chittagong District, Bangladesh. The total population is 20,460.

== Area ==
The area of Barkal Union is 6,257 acres (25.32 square kilometers).

== Demographics ==
According to the 2011 Bangladeshi census, Barkal Union had a population of 20,460, of which 10,712 were males and 9,748 were females. The total number of households was 3,928.

== Administration ==
Barkal Union is the 4th Union Parishad under Chandanaish Upazila. The administrative activities of this union fall under the jurisdiction of Chandanaiish Thana. It is part of Chittagong-14 (Constituency 291) of the National Parliament of Bangladesh.

== Education ==
According to the 2011 Bangladeshi census, Barkal Union had a literacy rate of 62.0%.
