= Patiya Upazila =

Upazila in Chittagong Division, Bangladesh

Patiya পটিয়া
- Upazila
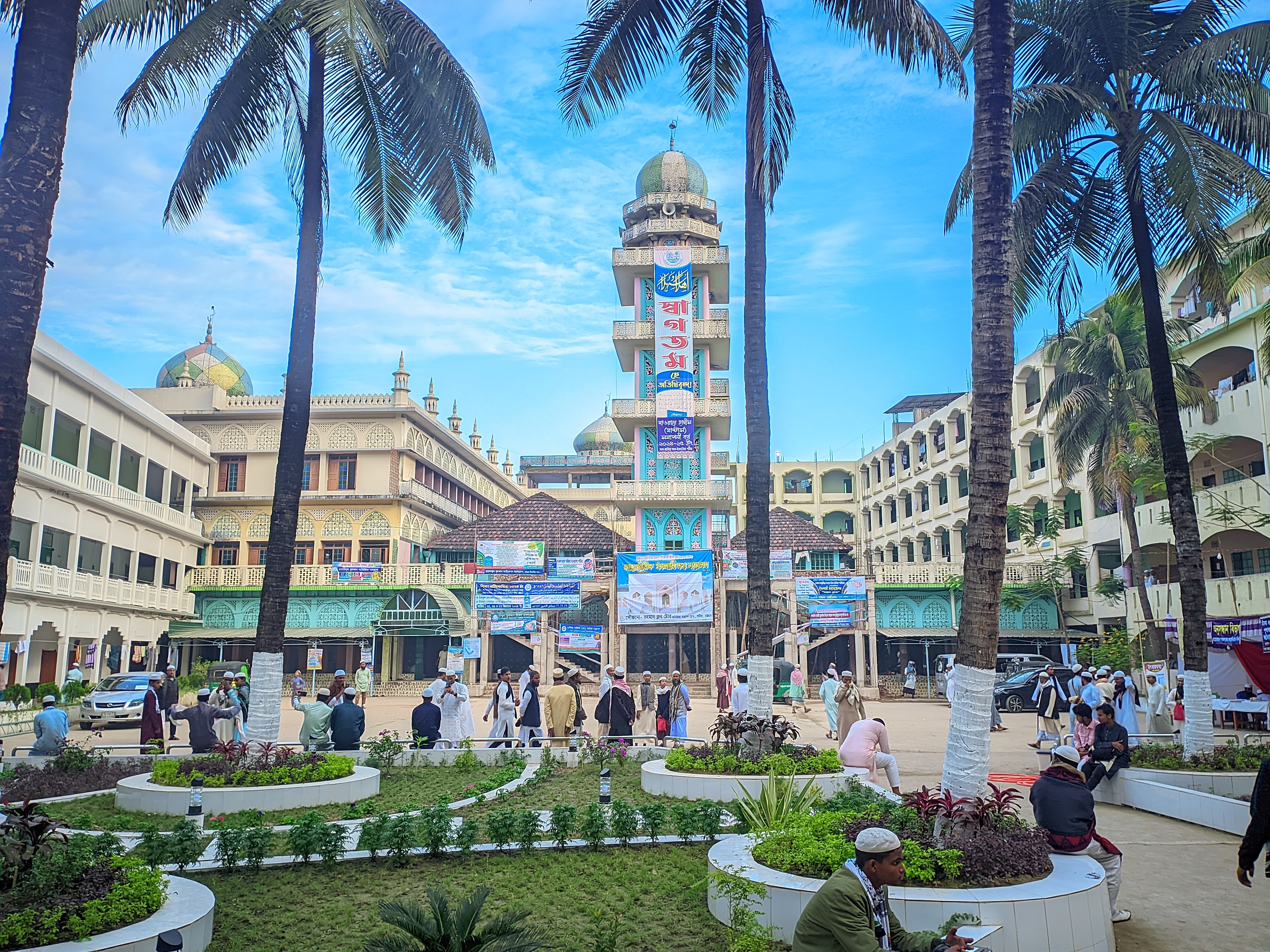
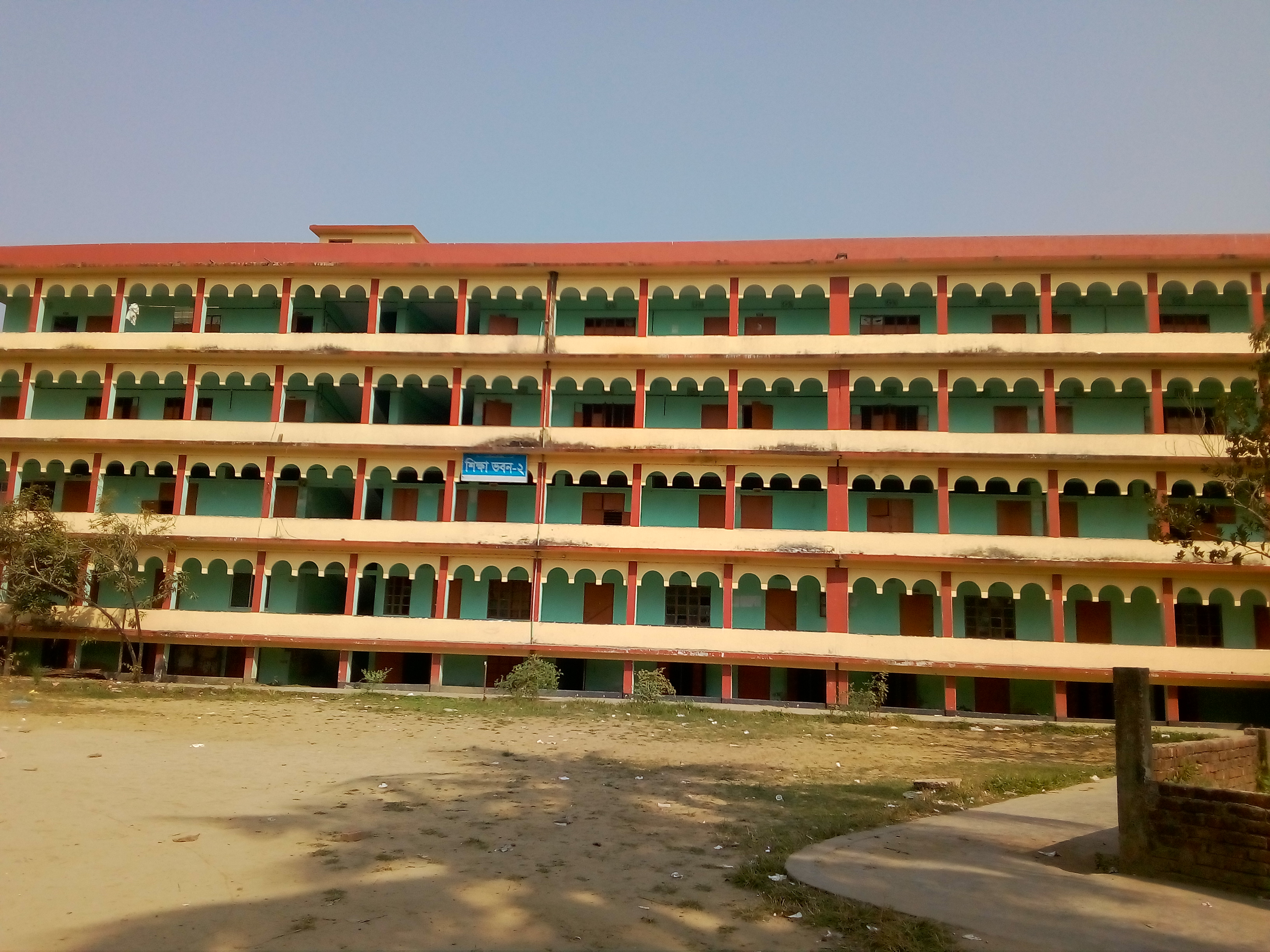
- Patiya madrasa and Shahchand Auliya Kamil Madrash

- Coordinates: 22°18′N 91°59′E
- Country: Bangladesh
- Division: Chittagong
- District: Chittagong
- Jatiya Sangsad constituency: Chittagong-12
- Headquarters: Patiya Upazila Complex

Government
  - Body: Upazila Council
  - MP: Vacant
  - Chairman: Vacant
  - Chief Executive Officer: Md. Alauddin Bhuya Jony

Area
  - Total: 156.34 km^{2} (60.36 sq mi)

Population (2022)
  - Total: 397,679
  - Density: 2,543.7/km^{2} (6,588.1/sq mi)
- Time zone: UTC+6 (BST)
- Postal code: 4370
- Area code: 03035
- Website: patiya.gov.bd

Patiya Upazila mauza geocode map

Patiya (Bengali: পটিয়া) is an upazila of Chittagong District in Chittagong Division, Bangladesh.

== History ==
During the British rule, a police station(thana) was established in Patiya in 1845. It was upgraded to an upazila in 1984. The region saw revolutionary activities in the 1930s, when revolutionaries from Jugantar and the fugitives of the Chittagong armoury raid fought with British police. During the Bangladesh Liberation War, the area sustained heavy bombings from Pakistan Air Force. The Pakistani occupation army massacred more than 300 Hindus in Muzaffarabad village on 3 May 1971 in collaboration with the Razakars.

== Geography ==
Patiya is located at 22.3000°N 91.9833°E. It has a total area of 316.47 km^{2} (122.19 sq mi).

The township of Patiya has an area of 9.96 km^{2} (3.85 sq mi).

"Budbudir Chora" is one prominent geographic feature of the region, and yearly, Budbudir Chora sees tourism for its small canals and animals like deer, birds and butterflies, that helps Patiya Upazila’s economy.

== Demographics ==
According to the 2022 Bangladeshi census, Patiya Upazila had 87,401 households and a population of 397,679. 8.77% of the population were under 5 years of age. Patiya had a literacy rate (age 7 and over) of 81.10%: 83.35% for males and 78.88% for females, and a sex ratio of 99.33 males for every 100 females. 107,447 (27.02%) lived in urban areas.

Religions in Patiya Upazila (2022)
Religion	Percent
Islam	80.25%
Hinduism	17.99%
Buddhism	1.74%
Other or not stated	0.02%

Population by religion in Union/Paurashava
Union/Paurashava	Muslim	Hindu	Others
Patiya Paurashava	58,178	7,826	804
Ashia Union	13,024	518	284
Baralia Union	13,680	1,880	1011
Bhatikhain Union	4,860	2,971	514
Chhanhara Union	11,301	3,188	180
Dakkhin Bhurshi Union	5,461	4,575	0
Dhalghat Union	8,149	9,065	848
Habilas Dwip Union	15,659	4,246	775
Haidgaon Union	20,258	4834	1
Jangalkhain Union	12,461	835	777
Jiri Union	37,149	3,236	10
Kachuai Union	18,304	6,616	2
Kashiaish Union	7,778	2,614	620
Kelishahar Union	7,503	7,760	306
Kharana Union	12,802	4,094	5
Kolagaon Union	24,601	3,931	577
Kusumpura Union	33,624	436	43
Shobhandandi Union	14,338	2,903	269

🟩 Muslim majority 🟧 Hindu majority

As of the 2011 Census of Bangladesh, Patiya upazila had 71,624 households and a population of 366,010. 52,611 (14.37%) were under 7 years of age. Patiya had an average literacy rate of 56.17%, compared to the national average of 51.8%, and a sex ratio of 1006 females per 1000 males. 55,323 (15.12%) of the population lived in urban areas.

According to the 1991 Bangladesh census, Patiya had a population of 398,836. Males constituted 52.1% of the population, and females 47.9%. The population aged 18 or over was 197,399. Patiya had an average literacy rate of 44.3% (7+ years), against the national average of 32.4%.

== Administration ==
Patiya Upazila is divided into Patiya Municipality and 22 union parishads: Asia, Bara Uthan, Baralia, Bhatikhain, Chanhara, Char Lakshya, Char Patharghata, Dakshin Bhurshi, Dhalghat, Habilasdwip, Haidgaon, Janglukhain, Jiri, Juldha, Kachuai, Kasiais, Kelishahar, Kharana, Kolagaon, Kusumpura, Sikalbaha, and Sobhandandi. The union parishads are subdivided into 113 mauzas and 208 villages.

Patiya Municipality is subdivided into 9 wards and 13 mahallas.

Chairman: Vacant

Vice Chairman: Vacant

Woman Vice Chairman: Vacant

Upazila Nirbahi Officer (UNO): Abdullah Al Mamun

Patiya Municipal Mayor: Vacant

== Education ==
According to Banglapedia, Abdur Rahman Government Girls' High School, founded in 1957, Abdus Sobhan Rahat Ali High School (1914), Chakrashala Krishi High School (1857), Muzaffarabad N. J. High School (1929), S A Noor High School (1966), Union Krishi High School (1978), Jangal Khain High School (1946) and Patiya Model High School (1845) are notable secondary schools.

The madrasa education system includes a notable kamil madrasa, Shahchand Auliya Kamil Madrasa, founded in 1928.

Notable qawmi madrasas include Al-Jameatul Arabiatul Islamia Ziri and Al Jamia Al Islamia Patiya.

== Notable residents ==
- Purnendu Dastidar, revolutionary politician and writer, was born in Dhalghat village in 1909.
- Maniruzzaman Islamabadi, Islamic philosopher and journalist, was from Barama village.
- Pritilata Waddedar, revolutionary nationalist, was born at Dhalghat village in 1911.
- Ayub Bachchu, a Bangladeshi musician.

== See also ==
- Upazilas of Bangladesh
- Districts of Bangladesh
- Divisions of Bangladesh
