= International reactions to the Gaza war =

On 7 October 2023, a large escalation of the Gaza–Israel conflict began with a coordinated offensive by multiple Palestinian militant groups, led by Hamas, against Israel. A number of countries, including many of Israel's Western allies, such as the United States and a number of European countries, condemned the attacks led by Hamas, expressed solidarity for Israel and stated that Israel has a right to defend itself from armed attacks, while countries in the Islamic world (including the Axis of Resistance) expressed support for the Palestinians, blaming the Israeli occupation of the Palestinian territories as being the root cause for the escalation of violence. The events prompted several world leaders to announce their intention to visit Israel, including US President Joe Biden, French President Emmanuel Macron, German Chancellor Olaf Scholz, and British Prime Minister Rishi Sunak.

Numerous countries called for a ceasefire and de-escalation. International organizations, student organizations, charities, ecumenical Christian organizations, and Jewish and Islamic groups commented on the situation. On 27 October 2023, the United Nations General Assembly passed a resolution calling for an immediate and sustained humanitarian truce and cessation of hostilities, adopted by a vote of 121 states to 14, with 44 abstentions. As a result of the war, Bahrain, Chad, Chile, Honduras, Jordan, South Africa, and Turkey, recalled their ambassadors from Israel, citing Israeli actions during the war, while Belize, Bolivia, Colombia, and Nicaragua severed diplomatic relations with Israel.

== Countries ==
On 27 October, the United Nations General Assembly passed Resolution ES-10/21 calling for an "immediate and sustained" humanitarian truce and condemned "all acts of violence aimed at Palestinian and Israeli civilians".

On 12 December, the UN General Assembly passed Resolution ES-10/22 calling for an immediate ceasefire and the "immediate and unconditional" release of the hostages.

=== Africa ===
- Algeria: The Foreign Ministry issued a statement heavily condemning the Israeli bombing of Gaza, urging international bodies to intervene in the conflict and declaring sympathy for the Palestinians fighting against "Israeli colonial settlement". In March 2024, Algeria proposed a motion to the United Nations Security Council to release a statement condemning the Flour massacre, which was blocked by the United States.
- Angola: Angola called for restrain and dialogue by both parties.
- Benin: In December 2023, Benin voted against condemning Hamas at the United Nations.
- Botswana: The Foreign Ministry released a statement condemning violence against civilians by both sides and urged for an immediate cessation of hostilities.
- Burundi: In December 2023, Burundi voted against condemning Hamas at the United Nations.
- Cape Verde: Cape Verde voted to condemn Hamas at the United Nations.
- Cameroon: Cameroon backed Israel and condemned Hamas.
- Central African Republic: The Central African Republic voted against condemning Hamas at the United Nations.
- Chad: Chad voted against condemning Hamas at the United Nations. On 5 November, it recalled its ambassador to Israel.
- Comoros: Comoros voted against condemning Hamas at the United Nations.
- Republic of the Congo: RO Congo voted against condemning Hamas at the United Nations.
- Democratic Republic of the Congo: The DRC condemned Hamas and backed Israel.
- Djibouti: Djibouti expressed support for Palestine.
- Egypt: Egypt urged both Israel and Palestine to exercise restraint. It also said the international community should "urge Israel to stop the attacks and provocative actions against the Palestinian people and to adhere to the principles of international humanitarian law with regard to the responsibilities of an occupying state." The Foreign Ministry warned of "severe dangers" and encouraged de-escalation. On 25 October, Egyptian President Abdel Fattah el-Sisi warned that a ground invasion of the Gaza Strip would cause "many, many civilian casualties". Sisi said that Israel's bombing of Gaza "went beyond the right to self-defense, turning into collective punishment for 2.3 million people in Gaza."
- Eritrea: In December 2023, Eritrea voted against condemning Hamas at the United Nations.
- Eswatini: The government said that they would not take sides in the Israeli–Palestinian conflict.
- Gabon: Gabon was one of four countries to vote at the United Nations Security Council in favor of a Russian-drafted resolution that condemned all violence in Gaza without explicitly condemning Hamas.
- Gambia: The Gambia voted against condemning Hamas at the United Nations.
- Ghana: The Foreign Ministry released a statement saying that "While Ghana affirms its support for Israel's right to exist and defend itself, it calls on the Israeli government to exercise restraint in its response to Hamas attacks".
- Guinea: Guinea voted against condemning Hamas at the United Nations.

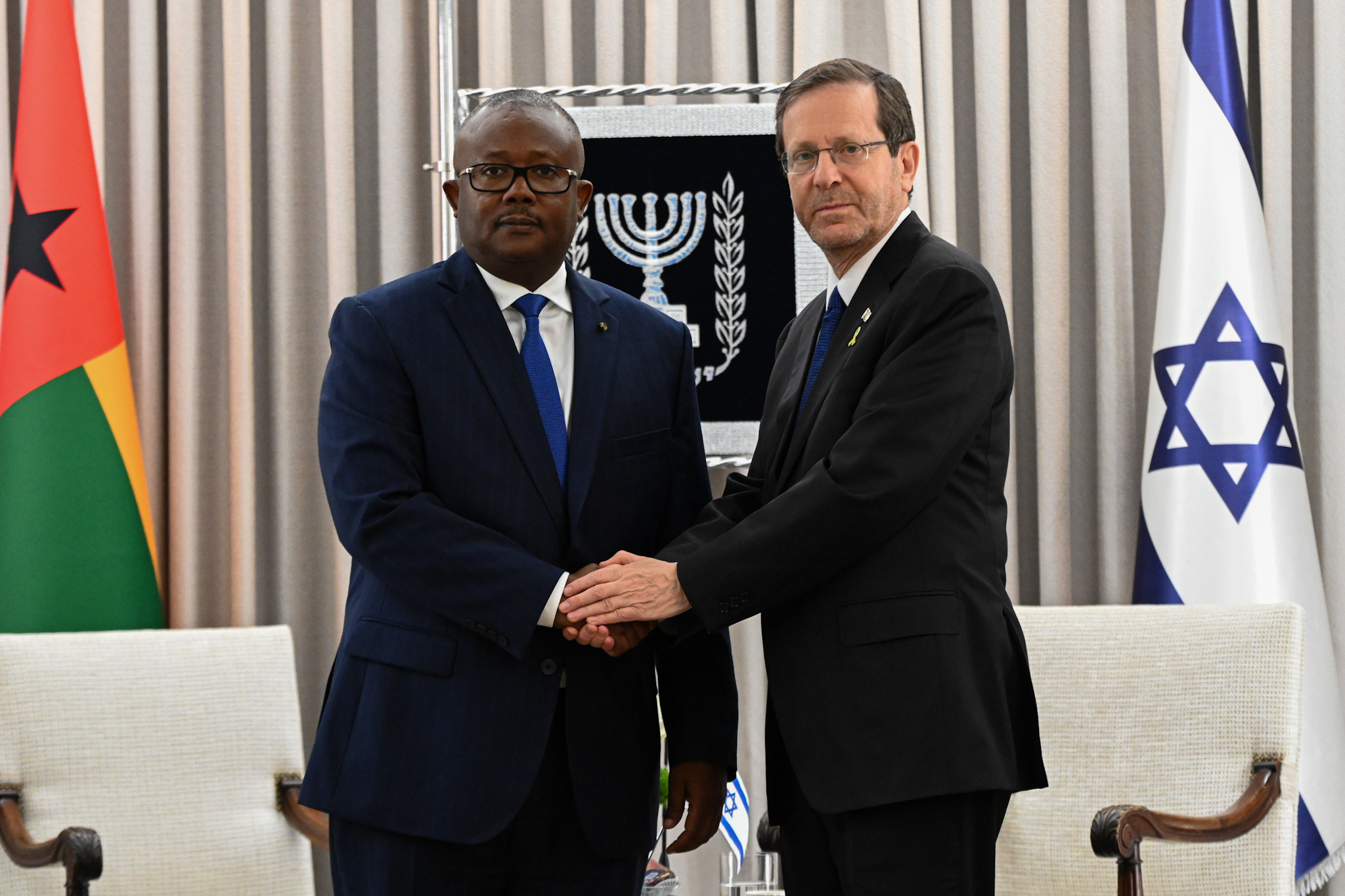
Guinea-Bissau's President Umaro Sissoco Embaló and Israeli President Isaac Herzog in Jerusalem, 3 March 2024

- Guinea-Bissau: President Umaro Sissoco Embaló condemned the actions by Israel when he called for "a cease-fire in the Gaza Strip, lamenting the escalation of violence and loss of human life." He later called on "both sides to hold back because there is a lot of human loss."
- Kenya: Korir Sing'Oei, the Principal Secretary in the State Department for Foreign Affairs, said that the country strongly condemned "the despicable terror attack against Israel and regrets the carnage and senseless loss of life", while repudiating "the planners, funders and implementers of this heinous attack". It acknowledged Israel's "right to retaliate", but urged "a peaceful path to resolving this unfortunate development".
- Libya: The High Council of State expressed support to Palestine and asked the Government of National Unity to sever diplomatic relationships with countries supporting Israel, while the Minister of Foreign Affairs Taher al-Badour called for an immediate halt of Israeli attacks in Gaza. The House of Representatives expressed support for Gaza, condemned Israel and asked the rival Government of National Stability to totally halt oil exports to countries which support Israel and the immediate expulsion of the ambassadors of the United States, the United Kingdom, France, Germany, and Italy from Libya.
- Malawi: Malawi voted to condemn Hamas at the United Nations.
- Mali: Mali stated its support for Palestine.
- Mauritania: Mauritania condemned Israel's military actions and a call for international intervention to protect Palestinian civilians. The Mauritanian government declared three days of national mourning following a deadly strike on a hospital in Gaza, which they described as "genocide" and urged the international community to impose an immediate halt to the violence.
- Morocco: The Foreign Ministry expressed "its deep concern at the deterioration of the situation and the outbreak of military action in the Gaza Strip", and condemned "attacks against civilians wherever they may be". Morocco voted against condemning Hamas at the United Nations.
- Mozambique: Mozambique was one of four countries at the United Nations Security Council that voted in favor of a Russian-drafted resolution that condemned all violence in Gaza without explicitly condemning Hamas.
- Namibia: The government condemned the escalation of violence, urged for diplomatic solutions and called on Israel to "cease its attacks and refrain from engaging in provocative acts against the Palestinian people."
- Niger: Niger stated its support for Palestine.
- Nigeria: Foreign Minister Yusuf Tuggar called for de-escalation, and asked both sides "to exercise restraint, prioritise the safety of civilians and give room for humanitarian considerations".
- Rwanda: The government said it "extends its deepest condolences and sympathy to the Government and the People of the State of Israel following attacks on Israeli territory".
- Sahrawi Republic: The Polisario Front expressed support for the Palestinian people.
- Senegal: Senegal voted against condemning Hamas at the United Nations.
- Seychelles: The Seychelles voted to condemn Hamas at the United Nations.
- Somalia: Somalia blamed Israel for the al-Ahli Arab Hospital bombing.
- South Africa: The Foreign Ministry issued a statement calling for de-escalation and blaming the conflagration on "the continued illegal occupation of Palestine land, continued settlement expansion, desecration of the Al-Aqsa Mosque and Christian holy sites, and ongoing oppression of the Palestinian people". South Africa affirmed its support of a two-state solution. Foreign minister Naledi Pandor was criticized by the South African Jewish Board of deputies for taking a phone call from Hamas ten days after its attack and accused her of taking sides in the conflict. Pandor denied expressing support for Hamas and said that she expressed support for the Palestinian people and discussed aid for the people of Gaza. South Africa voted against condemning Hamas at the United Nations. On 6 November, Minister in the Presidency, Khumbudzo Ntshavheni, announced a withdrawal of all its diplomats from Israel. On 21 November, the National Assembly passed a motion calling for the closure of the Israeli embassy and the cutting of diplomatic ties until Israel agreed to a ceasefire in Gaza. On 29 December, South Africa submitted the case South Africa v. Israel (Genocide Convention) to the International Court of Justice, arguing that Israel was responsible for a genocide of Palestinians in Gaza. In May 2024, ICJ judges called on Israel to halt its intended military offensive in the city of Rafah.
- South Sudan: President Salva Kiir wrote to Israeli Prime Minister Benjamin Netanyahu that South Sudan expressed "deepest sympathies to you and the people of Israel for the people you have lost to the heinous and provoked terror by Hamas," stating further that "no amount of political grievances can justify the killings of innocent civilians". South Sudan voted to condemn Hamas at the United Nations.
- Sudan: The Foreign Ministry said that Sudan supported "the legitimate rights of the Palestinian people to have their independent state", and called "for adherence to international resolutions and the protection of innocent civilians".
- Tanzania: The Foreign Ministry condemned all violence and called for dialogue between both sides.
- Togo: Foreign Minister Robert Dussey issued a statement saying that Togo "strongly condemns the Hamas terrorist attack against Israeli civilians."
- Tunisia: A statement from the Presidency said that the abstention was because the resolution did not go far enough in order to support the Palestinian people. It said that its "position will be to fully stand by the Palestinian people until they recover their entire land".
- Uganda: President Yoweri Museveni expressed concern for the situation and called for dialogue.
- Zambia: Foreign Minister Stanley Kakubo backed Israel in a statement condemning Hamas' attacks.
- Zimbabwe: Zimbabwe condemned Israeli actions in Gaza.

=== Americas ===
- Antigua and Barbuda: The government issued a statement condemning Hamas and conveying sympathies to the families of the victims of the attacks.

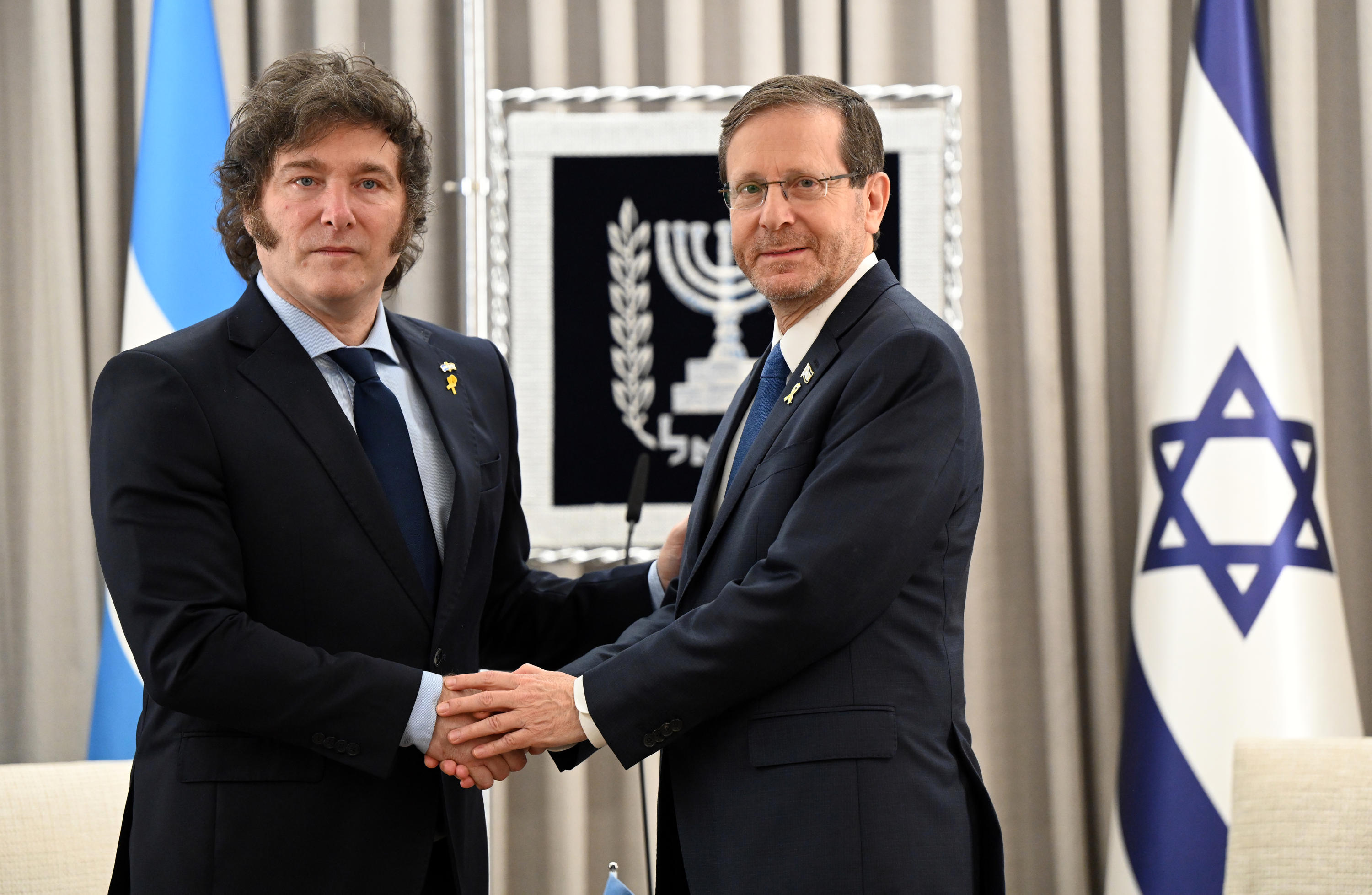
Argentina's President Javier Milei and Israeli President Herzog shake hands in Beit HaNassi in Jerusalem on 6 February 2024

- Argentina: President Alberto Fernández condemned the "brutal terrorist attacks" against Israel, while the Foreign Ministry stated that it "deplores" the "terrorist actions of Hamas against Israeli territory", further expressing solidarity with the Israeli people and sending condolences to those affected. Fernández later said on social media that he had made a phone call to Israeli president Isaac Herzog during which he expressed Argentina's "energic repudiation and condemnation of the atrocious terrorist attacks committed by Hamas." After the change of government in December 2023, newly inaugurated president Javier Milei stressed his support for Israel during a meeting with Israeli Foreign Minister Eli Cohen. Argentina also changed its position before the UN to abstaining in a resolution demanding a ceasefire. On 14 January 2024, Milei said that Argentina "endorses Israel's right to self-defense."
- Bahamas: Foreign Minister Fred Mitchell called for the "cessation of activities between Hamas and Israel."
- Barbados: Barbados voted to condemn Hamas at the United Nations.
- Belize: Foreign Minister Eamon Courtenay called for de-escalation and urged for Palestinian statehood, with East Jerusalem as the capital. On 15 November 2023, Belize terminated diplomatic ties with Israel, citing its "indiscriminate bombing" in Gaza.
- Bolivia: The government expressed "deep concern" at the situation and criticized the "inaction of the United Nations and the Security Council." Bolivia voted against condemning Hamas at the United Nations. On 31 October 2023, the nation cut ties with Israel due to "crimes against humanity".
- Brazil: The Foreign Ministry stated that as president of the United Nations Security Council, Brazil would call an emergency meeting of the body and seek to de-escalate the situation. Brazil condemned the attacks on Israel and expressed condolences with the Israeli people. Brazil also reiterated its support of a two-state solution based on mutually agreed upon borders. President Luiz Inácio Lula da Silva criticized Israel's actions in the Gaza Strip calling it "the insanity" of Prime Minister Benjamin Netanyahu.
- Canada: Prime Minister Justin Trudeau said that "Canada strongly condemns the current terrorist attacks against Israel" and called the violence "completely unacceptable". He added that the country stood with Israel and fully supported "its right to defend itself". Trudeau later put out a statement asserting "Hamas does not represent the Palestinian people nor their legitimate aspirations" and "Canada stands firmly with the Israeli and Palestinian peoples in their right to live in peace, security, with dignity and without fear." On 14 November 2023, Trudeau urged Israel to stop "this killing of women, of children, of babies" in the Gaza Strip. His statements were subsequently criticized by Israeli Prime Minister Benjamin Netanyahu. On 21 December, Trudeau stated Israel's actions were putting long-term support into question.
- Chile: The government of President Gabriel Boric expressed its "absolute condemnation" of the attacks "against a series of towns and cities in Israel", sending condolences to the victims' families and its solidarity with the people of Israel. It also called for an end to "unconducive" violence, and asked the international community for a "direct and good-faith negotiations" between Israel and Palestine, that could lead to a peace agreement that is "fair, full and definitive". It also supported a two-state solution, with safe frontiers agreed upon mutually and internationally recognized. On 1 November, Chile recalled its ambassador to Israel, citing "unacceptable" violations of international humanitarian law in the Gaza Strip. On 18 January 2024, Foreign Minister Alberto van Klaveren stated the country's interest in an investigation by the International Criminal Court into Israeli war crimes.
- Colombia: The Foreign Ministry issued a statement calling for an urgent resumption of "dialogue between Israel and Palestine to begin a peace process that leads to peaceful coexistence, within mutually agreed upon secure borders and internationally recognized, with full support for the territorial integrity of the parties." Israel later halted all security exports to Colombia after president Gustavo Petro compared the IDF to Nazi Germany. In response, Petro threatened to suspend diplomatic relations between the two countries, stating that "we do not support genocides". On 31 October, Petro recalled Colombia's ambassador to Israel in protest over the "massacre of Palestinian people". On 1 May 2024, Petro announced that Colombia would sever diplomatic relations with Israel over its conduct in Gaza.
- Costa Rica: The Foreign Ministry condemned the attacks as terrorism, and expressed its solidarity with Israel.
- Cuba: President Miguel Diaz-Canel, Prime Minister Manuel Marrero, and Foreign Minister Bruno Rodríguez Parrilla joined a pro-Palestine demonstration in Havana on 23 November.
- Dominica: Prime Minister Roosevelt Skerrit condemned the conflict, calling it "abhorrent". In December 2023, Dominica voted against condemning Hamas at the United Nations.
- Dominican Republic: The Dominican Republic voted to condemn Hamas at the United Nations.
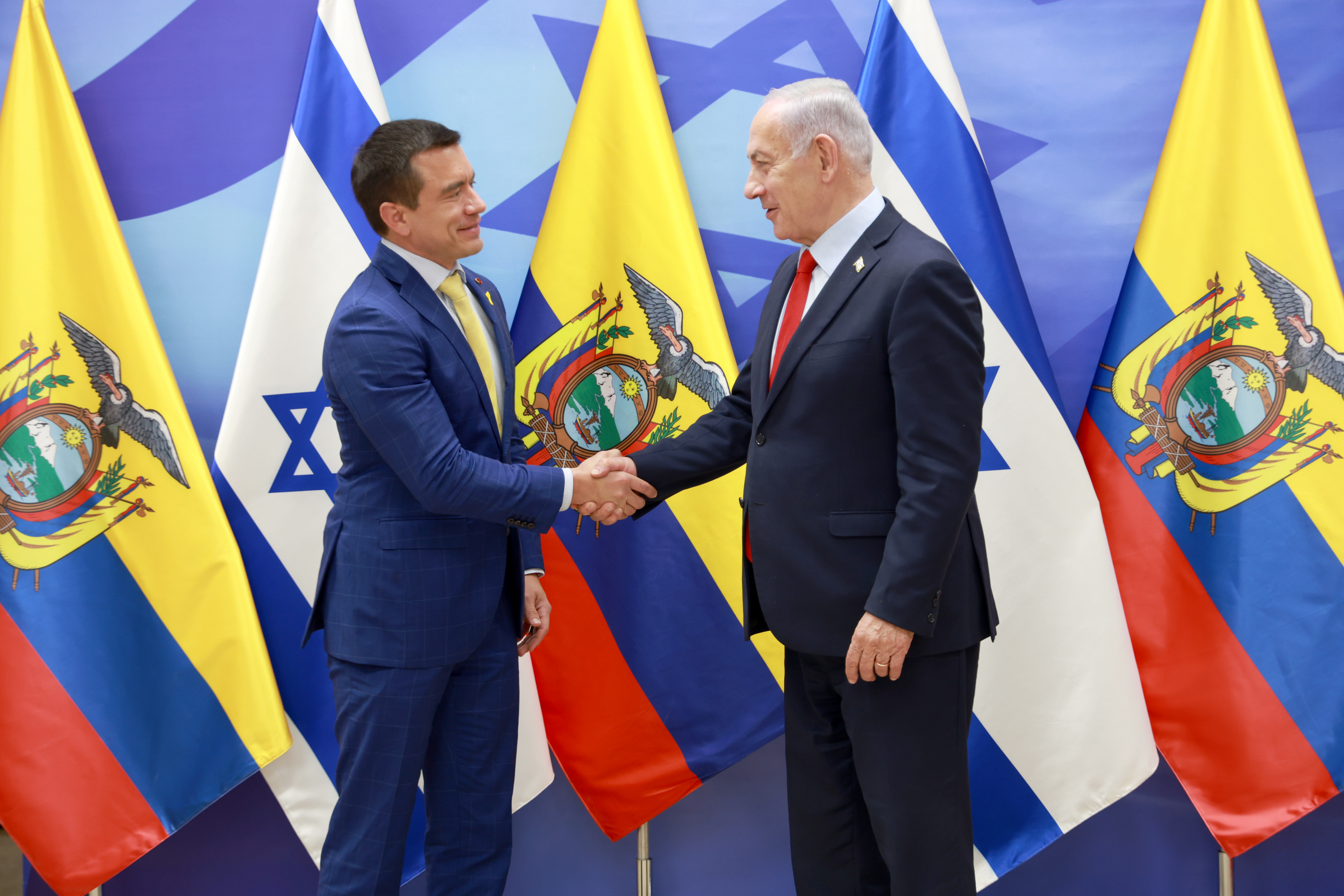
  Ecuadorian President Daniel Noboa and Israeli Prime Minister Benjamin Netanyahu during Noboa's state visit to Israel in May 2025
- Ecuador: The government condemned the attacks on Israel, expressed solidarity with the Israeli people, and reiterated that it was committed to a negotiated, definitive and fair solution for both Israel and Palestine.
- El Salvador: President Nayib Bukele, who is of Palestinian descent, described Hamas as "savage beasts" on X, stating that Hamas "[does] not represent the Palestinians" and compared the group to MS-13, a Salvadoran criminal gang. Bukele expressed his support for the Palestinian people and called on Palestinians to "get rid of those animals [Hamas] and let the good people thrive". In December 2023, El Salvador voted against condemning Hamas at the United Nations.
- Guatemala: The Foreign Ministry strongly condemned the attacks. It conveyed its solidarity to the People and Government of Israel, and advocated for the prompt restoration of peace.
- Guyana: Guyana voted against condemning Hamas at the United Nations.
- Honduras: The government issued a statement condemning Hamas for the attacks, expressed solidarity with the people of Israel and made a call for a ceasefire. However, on 3 November, Honduras recalled its ambassador to Israel citing violations of international humanitarian law in Gaza.
- Jamaica: Prime Minister Andrew Holness condemned the attacks on Israel and conveyed his sympathies to its people.

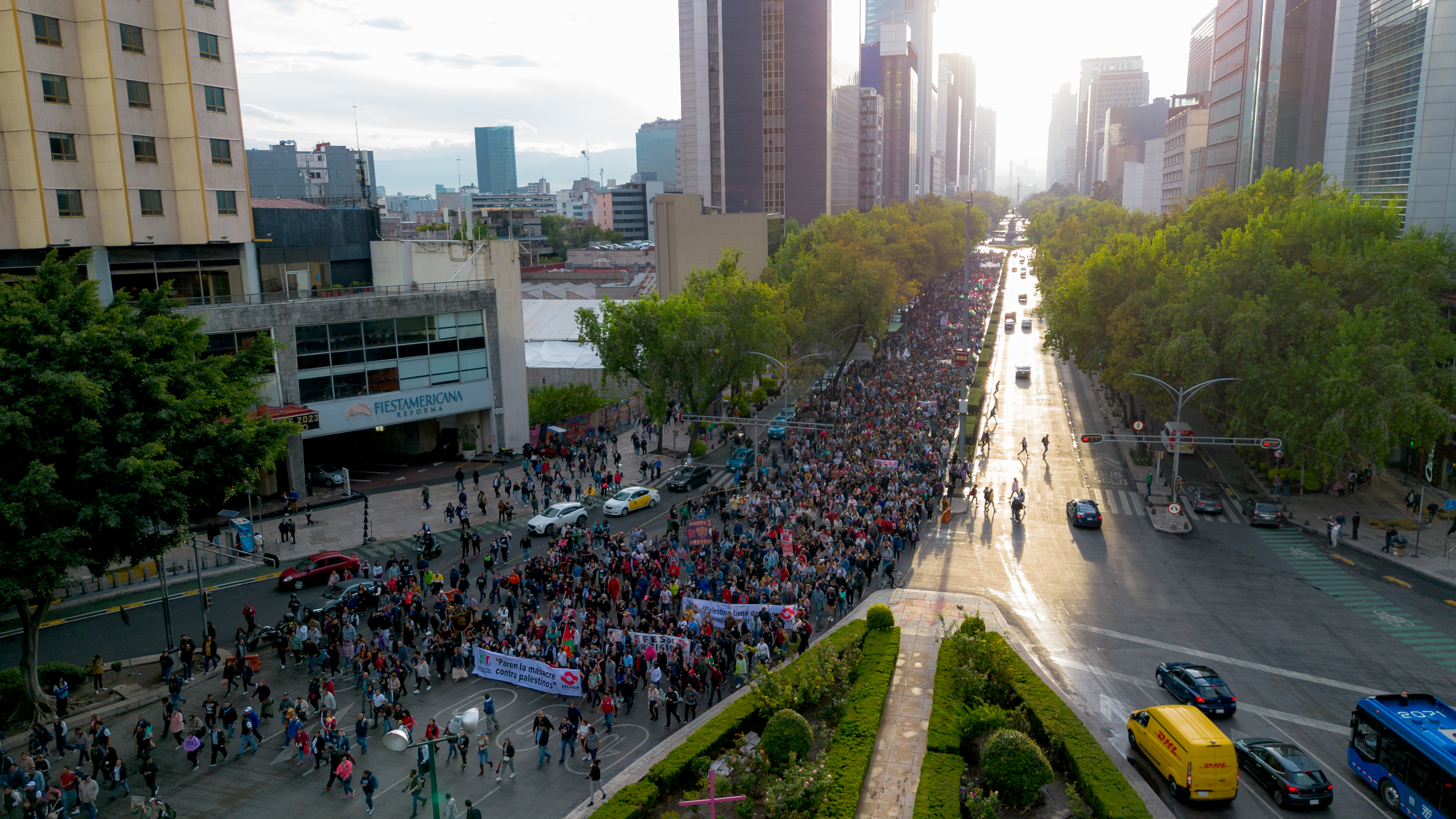
Pro-Palestinian protest in Mexico City on 29 November 2023

- Mexico: The Foreign Ministry condemned the attacks on Israel, and noted that Israel and Palestine had a right to coexist in peace. President Andrés Manuel López Obrador reiterated such on 9 October, calling for a two-state solution. On 18 January 2024, Mexico announced support for investigation into Israeli war crimes in Gaza by the International Criminal Court after reviewing UN reports and the South Africa's genocide case against Israel.
- Nicaragua: President Daniel Ortega condemned the "terrible aggravation" of the conflict and said that the country was always in "solidarity with the Palestinian cause."
- Panama: President Laurentino Cortizo "firmly" condemned the attacks and expressed solidarity with the Israeli people.
- Paraguay: President Santiago Peña condemned "these inhuman actions that threaten the peace of the world", while the Foreign Ministry condemned the attacks.
- Peru: The Foreign Ministry strongly condemned the attacks by Hamas, and reaffirmed its commitment to the peace process between Israel and Palestine.
- Saint Lucia: In December 2023, Saint Lucia voted against condemning Hamas at the United Nations.
- Saint Vincent and the Grenadines: Prime Minister Ralph Gonsalves called for de-escalation and peace. In December 2023, Saint Vincent and the Grenadines voted against condemning Hamas at the United Nations.
- Suriname: Suriname condemned the actions by Hamas and called for de-escalation.
- Trinidad and Tobago: In December 2023, Trinidad and Tobago voted against condemning Hamas at the United Nations.

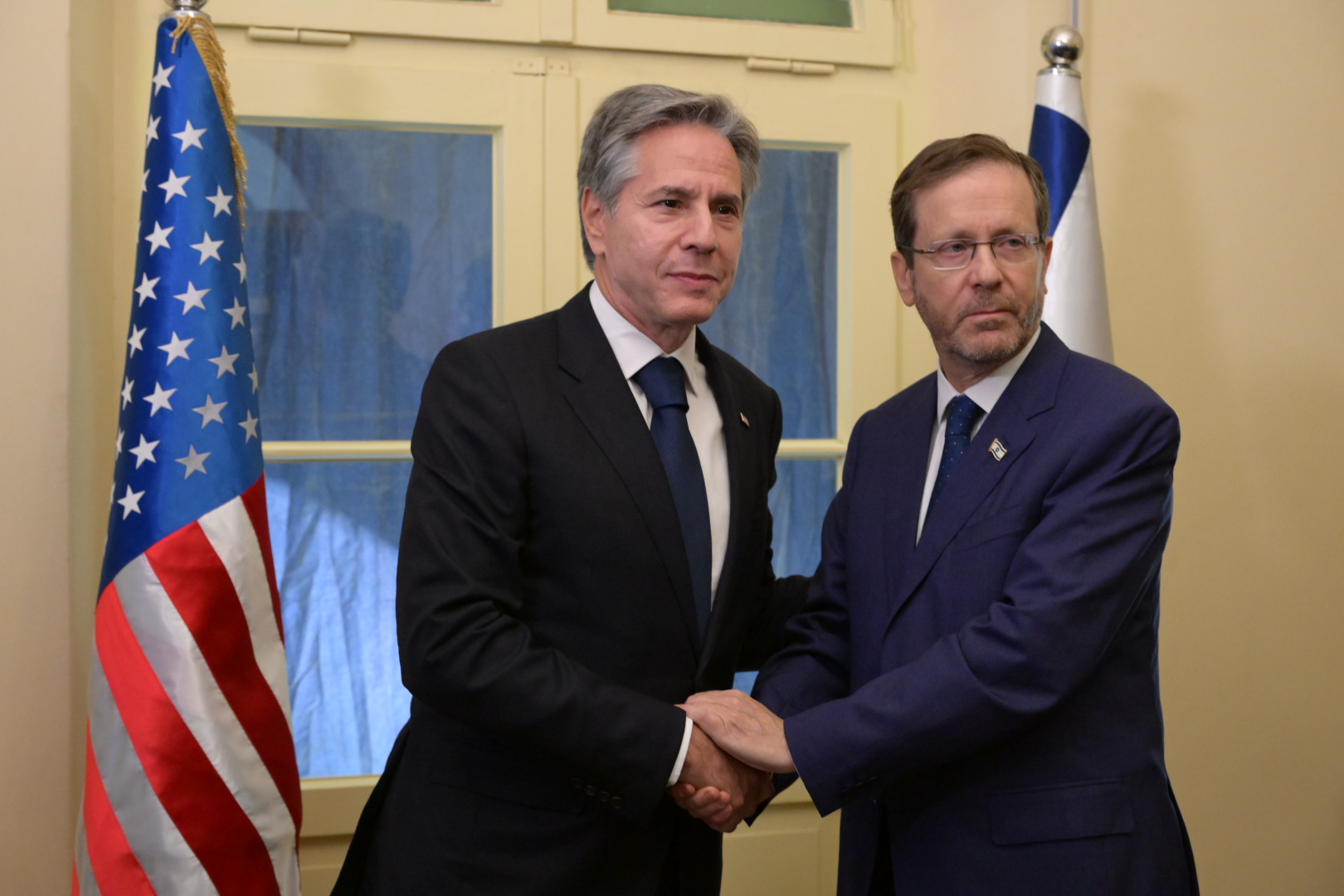
U.S. Secretary of State Antony Blinken and Israeli President Isaac Herzog in Tel Aviv, Israel, 12 October 2023

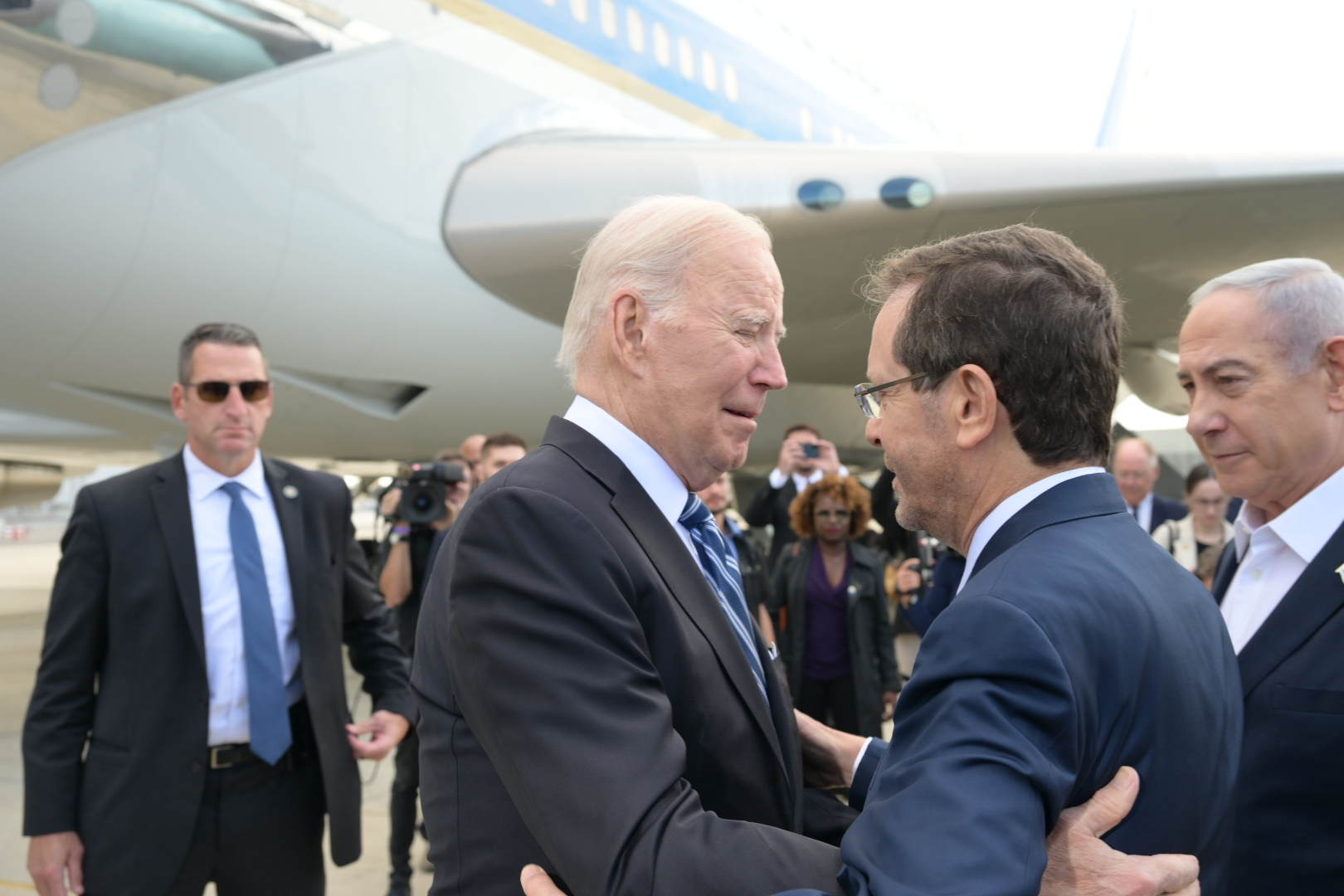
U.S. President Joe Biden with Israeli Prime Minister Benjamin Netanyahu and President Isaac Herzog, 18 October 2023

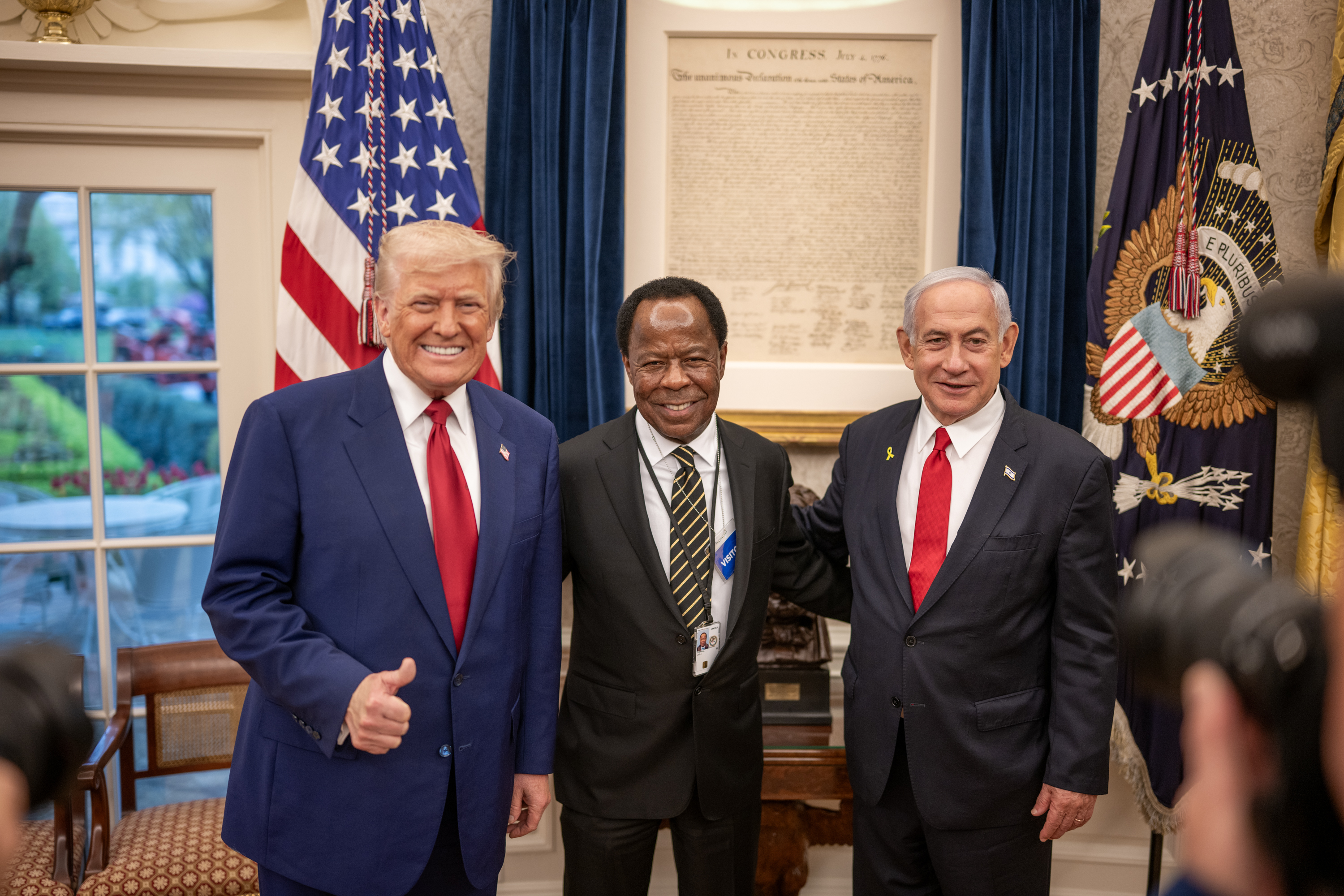
U.S. President Donald Trump and Israeli Prime Minister Netanyahu at the White House, 7 April 2025

- United States: President Joe Biden issued a statement condemning the attacks and saying that he was ready to offer "all appropriate means of support to the Government and people of Israel". Acting ambassador to Israel, Stephanie Hallett said she was "sickened by the images coming out of southern Israel of dead and wounded civilians at the hands of terrorists from Gaza". The White House issued a statement saying the United States "unequivocally condemns the unprovoked attacks by Hamas terrorists against Israeli civilians". Immediately following the initial attacks on Israel, the US Office of Palestinian Affairs on 7 October urged "all sides" to refrain from "retaliatory attacks".
  US Defense Secretary Lloyd Austin on 8 October ordered the deployment of a carrier strike group led by the aircraft carrier USS Gerald R. Ford to the Eastern Mediterranean. The group also included the cruiser USS Normandy and the destroyers USS Thomas Hudner, USS Ramage, USS Carney, and USS Roosevelt. On 9 October, the White House was lit up in the colors of the Israeli flag. On 10 October, President Biden announced that "Hamas has set a goal of killing Jews". He also said that Hamas' attacks aimed to halt an agreement between Israel and Saudi Arabia. The US Treasury Department imposed sanctions on ten individuals and entities affiliated with Hamas and its financial networks in retaliation to its attack on Israel. In an interview that aired on 15 October, President Joe Biden said an Israeli occupation of Gaza "would be a big mistake", adding that he was "confident Israel will act under the rules of war". He also said that Hamas must be eliminated, that there must be a path to a Palestinian state, and regarded the initial Hamas attack as consequential as The Holocaust. On 12 December, Biden warned that Israel was losing international support because of its "indiscriminate bombing" of Gaza.
  On 1 February 2024, the US House of Representatives passed a bill to prohibit individuals associated with Hamas and other perpetrators of the 7 October attack from seeking immigration-related relief or protections in the United States. The resolution, an amendment to the US immigration code, specifically targets Hamas, Palestinian Islamic Jihad, and the Palestine Liberation Organization. The bill now awaits consideration by the US Senate. On 8 February, Biden called Israel's actions in Gaza "over the top". Following this, the Biden administration issued a national security directive requiring written assurances from Israel (and other countries) that it was using US-supplied weapons in line with international law. On 20 February, the US proposed a draft UN Security Council resolution, calling for a "temporary ceasefire in Gaza as soon as practicable, based on the formula of all hostages being released". It stated that a Rafah offensive would have "serious implications" and "should not proceed under current circumstances". The US said it would not yet put the resolution to a vote as it wanted to allow negotiations to continue. In early March, the US began airdrops of aid into Gaza and began building the Gaza floating pier so aid can be delivered by sea. On 4 March, US vice president Kamala Harris called for "an immediate ceasefire for at least the next six weeks" because of "the immense scale of suffering in Gaza". She said Israel must let more aid into Gaza and called on Hamas to accept a ceasefire deal involving the release of hostages. Over 100 American localities had passed resolutions calling for a ceasefire in the war. On 22 March, the US put forward a draft UN Security Council resolution which stated the "imperative" for "an immediate and sustained ceasefire", facilitating aid delivery and supporting ongoing talks between Israel and Hamas, linked to the release of hostages. It was vetoed by Russia and China. On 25 March, the US abstained on a UN Security Council ceasefire resolution, allowing it to pass.
- Uruguay: President Luis Lacalle Pou said he strongly condemned the Hamas attacks and called for an "immediate cessation of violence against the Israeli people". The Foreign Ministry issued a statement in which it expressed that the Government and the Uruguayan people "deplore with the greatest firmness the terrorist actions underway against Israel and its population," and stressed their rejection of terrorism and their commitment to the security of Israel.
- Venezuela: The Foreign Ministry issued a statement expressing its "profound concern over the evolution of recent events in the Gaza Strip, while considering that the escalation is the result of the impossibility of the Palestinian people to find a space in multilateral international legality to assert their historical rights". The statement called for dialogue and the implementation of the United Nations Security Council Resolution 2334.

=== Asia ===
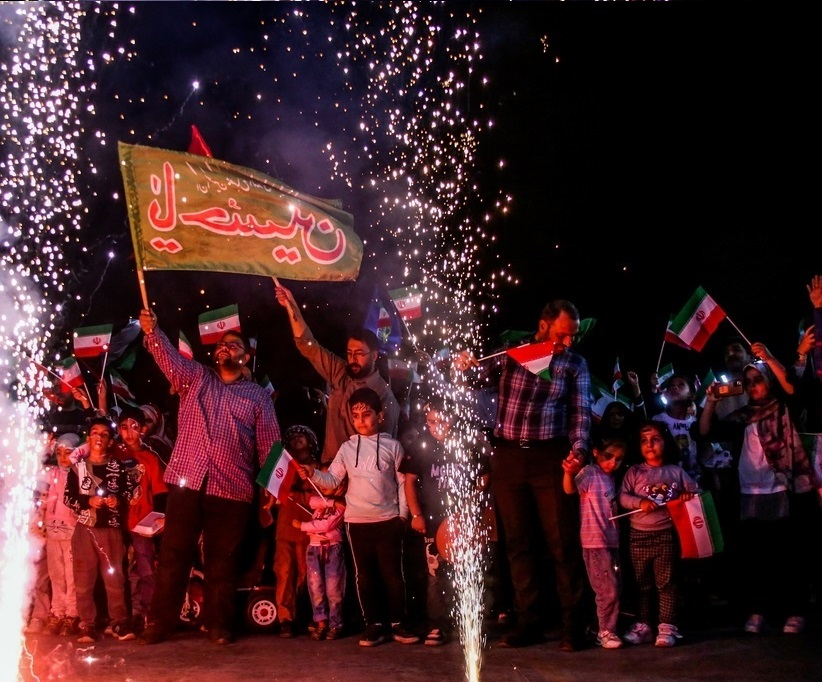
Celebrations in Iran, 7 October 2023

- Afghanistan: The Foreign Ministry said that the country had "carefully monitored the recent events in the Gaza Strip" and considered "the occurrence of such events to be the result of Israeli Zionists trampling on the rights of the oppressed Palestinian people and repeated insults and disrespect to Muslim holy places, and any type of defense and the resistance of the Palestinian people for freedom."
- Bahrain: The Foreign Ministry called for de-escalation, and affirmed its support of a two-state solution. On 9 October it officially condemned Hamas' kidnappings. On 2 November, Bahrain recalled its ambassador to Israel and cut off all economic relations citing its war in Gaza.

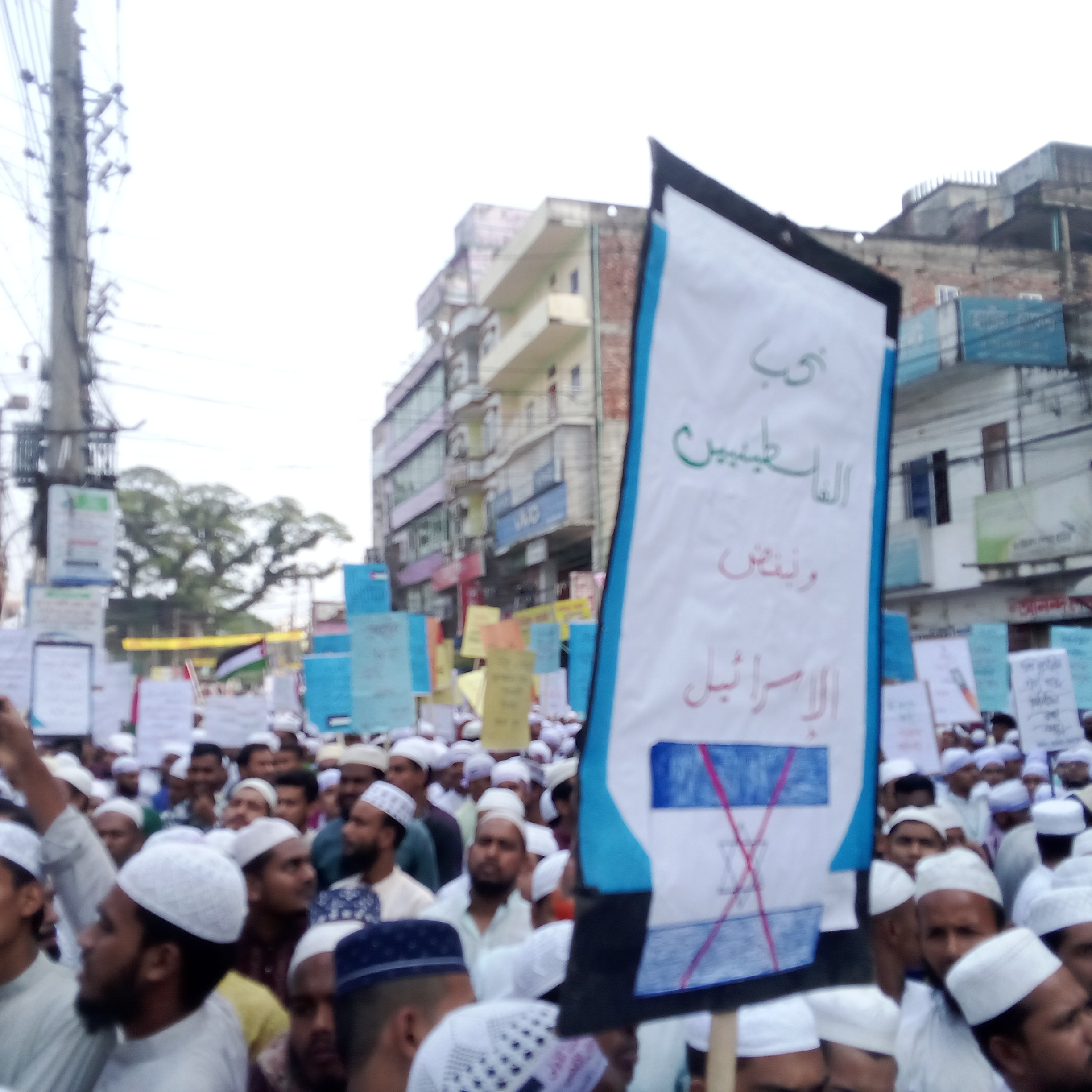
Anti-Israel banner at a demonstration in Bangladesh

- Bangladesh: The Foreign Ministry issued a press statement calling for an immediate ceasefire and solving the conflict with dialogue and diplomacy. It condemned the armed conflict, expressed deep concern over the "tragic loss of civilian lives", and urged both sides to "exercise maximum refrainment". It also denounced the "Israeli occupation and forced settlements on Palestinian Territories" and reaffirmed its support for the two-state solution.
- Brunei: Brunei reiterated solidarity with Palestinians.
- Cambodia: The Foreign Ministry issued a statement condemning all forms of violence and terrorist acts and called on all parties involved in the fighting in Israel to exercise the utmost restraint and seek avenues.
- China: The Foreign Ministry expressed concern over the "escalation of tensions and violence between Palestine and Israel", urging relevant parties to "exercise restraint and immediately end the hostilities to protect civilians and avoid further deterioration of the situation". After a diplomat from the Israeli embassy criticized Beijing for not condemning Hamas, ministry spokeswoman Mao Ning renewed calls for a two-state solution and said as "a friend to both Israel and Palestine, what we hope to see is the two countries living together in peace." On 18 October, China's UN ambassador Zhang Jun condemned the "heinous attack" on Al-Ahli Hospital and urged Israel to "fulfil its obligations under international humanitarian law", adding that Palestinians had been forced to move south because of Israel's evacuation order "only to suffer from air strikes in the south as well". China voted against condemning Hamas at the United Nations. On 30 October, China's embassy in France posted a photo on X comparing intact buildings in Xinjiang with buildings in Gaza destroyed in the bombing; the photo was criticised by heads of the World Uyghur Congress and East Turkistan Government in Exile.
  Regarding an ICJ order calling on Israel to take measures to prevent genocide in Gaza, Foreign Ministry spokesman Wang Wenbin on 29 January 2024 said it was a response to the international community's concern about easing the humanitarian crisis there, adding: "We hope the ICJ's provisional measures can be effectively implemented." At a news conference in Beijing on 7 March 2024, Foreign Minister Wang Yi called the conflict "a tragedy for humanity and a disgrace for civilisation", adding that "injustice done to the Palestinian people must be corrected." In May 2025, Chinese Ambassador to Israel Xiao Junzheng stated the October 7 attacks was "inhumane, unforgivable and also outrageous", adding "China opposes and condemns what Hamas did on the seventh of October", while maintaining support for a two-state solution. In July 2025, Xiao said that "China has made it clear and publicly that we oppose Iran’s development and possession of nuclear weapons" and that "We respect Israel’s right to subsistence and development. We are against some slogans by some people and some countries about wiping Israel off the map of the world." He added that China condemns "intrusion" by Hamas into Israeli territory, stating "international law grants occupied populations rights to employ armed resistance ending foreign occupation" but that "this stops there" and does not allow invading Israeli territory and violence against civilians. In August 2025, China officially referred to genocide in Gaza with the U.S. as an "accomplice" and called for the "imperative of an arm embargo on Israel."
- India: Prime Minister Narendra Modi said the government condemned the "terrorist attacks on Israel", adding that "we stand in solidarity with Israel at this difficult hour". The Ministry Of External Affairs added that while they condemned the actions of Hamas, they supported the establishment of Palestine. India voted to condemn Hamas at the United Nations.
- Indonesia: The Foreign Ministry issued a statement expressing its deep concern "with the escalation of conflict between Palestine and Israel", and urged the immediate end of violence to avoid further human casualties. It also called for the occupation of Palestinian territories by Israel as the root of the conflict, to be resolved in accordance with the parameters agreed upon by the United Nations. President Joko Widodo, in his address on 10 October, urged both sides to stop the conflict, deescalate the tensions, and ordered the foreign ministry to protect Indonesian nationals currently in Palestine and Israel.
- Iran: The Supreme Leader of Iran Ayatollah Ali Khamenei said that "the U.S. is responsible for the recent crimes." He added, "If the crimes of the Zionist regime continue, no one can stop the Muslims and the resistance forces". Yahya Rahim Safavi, former commander of the Islamic Revolutionary Guard Corps and an adviser to the Khamenei, congratulated the Palestinian fighters, and stated that Iran would "stand by the Palestinian fighters", until the "liberation of Palestine and Jerusalem". Ayatollah Ahmad Alamolhoda, a representative of Khamenei asked people to be ready to mobilize for a war between Islam and infidels. During a session of the Islamic Consultative Assembly, legislators rose from their seats and chanted "Down with Israel", "Down with America", and "Welcome Palestine". After speaking by phone with Hamas leader Ismail Haniyeh and Islamic Jihad leader Ziyad al-Nakhalah, President Ebrahim Raisi praised the "legitimate defense" of the Palestinian nation and said Israel and its supporters "must be held accountable". Foreign Ministry spokesperson Nasser Kanaani said that Hamas' attack showed increased confidence by the Palestinians against Israel. He also denied claims of Iranian involvement in Hamas' attack. During a meeting with UN diplomat Tor Wennesland on 14 October, foreign minister Hossein Amir-Abdollahian warned that Iran could intervene in the war if the IDF launched a ground invasion of Gaza.
- Iraq: The official government spokesperson said that military operations undertaken by the Palestinians were a natural result of decades of "systemic oppression" by the "Zionist Occupation authority".
- Japan: A Foreign Ministry spokesperson said that the country "strongly condemns the rocket attacks and armed incursions against Israel" and expressed "its condolences to the bereaved families and its heartfelt sympathy to the injured".
- Jordan: King Abdullah II warned that continued escalation of the conflict would create negative repercussions on the region and urged restraint, the protection of civilians and respect for international humanitarian law. Foreign Minister Ayman Safadi warned of the "volatility" of the situation. On 1 November, Jordan recalled its ambassador to Israel, accusing the country of creating an "unprecedented humanitarian catastrophe" and "killing innocent people in Gaza". It also said that Israel's ambassador, who left Amman shortly after Hamas' attack, would not be allowed to return until the war ended. Prime Minister Bisher Khasawneh said all options were on the table in "dealing with the Israeli aggression on Gaza and its repercussions."
- Kazakhstan: Aibek Smadiyarov, the press secretary of the Foreign Ministry, urged all parties not to resort to actions that could escalate the situation between the two states and the Middle East region.
- Kuwait: Kuwait blamed Israel for what it called its "blatant attacks".
- Kyrgyzstan: The Foreign Ministry called for dialogue and the cessation of hostilities.
- Laos: The government called for de-escalation and urged for a two-state solution.
- Lebanon: Lebanon voted against condemning Hamas at the United Nations.
- Malaysia: The Foreign Ministry issued a statement expressing its "concern over the latest escalation in the Middle East", blaming the root cause on "prolonged illegal occupation, blockade and sufferings, the desecration of Al-Aqsa, as well as the politics of dispossession at the hands of Israel as the occupier". It called for a return to the pre-1967 border and on the United Nations Security Council to "demand all parties stop the violence as well as respect and protect the lives of innocent civilians". Prime Minister Anwar Ibrahim also explicitly refused to condemn Hamas allegedly under pressure from Western nations, emphasizing his country's long standing relationship with the group. Malaysia voted against condemning Hamas at the United Nations. On 20 December, Malaysia announced a ban on Israeli-owned and Israeli-flagged ships, along with those headed for Israel, from docking at Malaysian ports.
- Maldives: The Foreign Ministry released a statement saying that the government considered "these deliberate acts of aggression against the innocent civilian population of Palestine a blatant disregard and violation of international humanitarian law, tantamount to a war crime," the statement said.
- Mongolia: The Foreign Ministry released a statement saying that the country condemned "the rocket and terror attacks from Gaza on Israel, which have resulted in deaths and injuries of many innocent civilians." It also called "on all parties concerned to immediately end violence and to protect the safety and security of civilians at all cost".
- Myanmar: Following the Al-Ahli Arab Hospital explosion, the military junta expressed concern about the conflict and urged relevant parties to follow restraint. The opposition government of the National League for Democracy, which is present at the United Nations, voted to condemn Hamas.
- Nepal: Prime Minister Pushpa Kamal Dahal condemned Hamas' offensive on Israel calling it a "terrorist attack".
- North Korea: Rodong Sinmun, the official newspaper of the ruling Workers' Party of Korea, published an editorial blaming Israel for the conflict, stating that the "international community claims that this clash was the result of Israel's constant criminal acts against the Palestinian people, and that the fundamental way out is to build an independent Palestinian state".
- Oman: The Foreign Ministry called on the international community to "intervene immediately to stop the ongoing escalation and resort to the rules of international law". It affirmed its support for a Two-state solution involving a Palestinian state with East Jerusalem as its capital.
- Pakistan: The Foreign Office issued a statement urging an immediate ceasefire and a return to peaceful negotiations, stating that they were "closely monitoring the unfolding situation". Pakistan reiterated its position that the solution to the conflict was a two-state solution, including the establishment of a viable, sovereign and contiguous State of Palestine with Jerusalem as its capital.
- Philippines: The Office of President Bongbong Marcos issued a statement conveying "its deepest sympathies and condolences to those who have lost their family members and loved ones in recent attacks". It also condemned the attack and said that "the Philippines understands the right of states to self-defense in the light of external aggression as recognized in the United Nations Charter." The National Security Council proposed to officially designate Hamas as a terrorist organization. The Philippines abstained from voting for a United Nations General Assembly resolution calling for a humanitarian truce in Gaza, due to the lack of explicit condemnation on Hamas' initial attacks on 7 October.
  - Bangsamoro: The Bangsamoro Parliament on 17 October passed a resolution condemning acts of violence and "collective punishment" against Palestinians and urged for unconditional cessation of hostilities between Israel and Hamas and for both sides to allow the United Nations to establish a humanitarian corridor. It also said that the conflict should not be viewed in isolation and should be understood in the wider context of the decades-long Palestinian struggle towards self-determination. On 16 November, the parliament passed a resolution to reiterate its call for "ceasefire now".
- Qatar: The Foreign Ministry issued a statement saying Israel was "solely responsible for the ongoing escalation due to its continuous violations of the rights of the Palestinian people, including the recent repeated incursions into the Al-Aqsa Mosque under the protection of the Israeli police."
- Saudi Arabia: The Foreign Ministry released a statement calling for an "immediate halt" to the "escalation" in Israel and Gaza. It added they were "closely following developments in the unprecedented situation between a number of Palestinian factions and the Israel Defense Forces, which has resulted in a high level of violence taking place on a number of fronts there" and reiterated "its repeated warnings [to Israel] of the dangers of the explosion of the situation as a result of the continued occupation, and deprivation of the Palestinian people of their legitimate rights, and the repetition of systematic provocations against its sanctities".
- Singapore: A spokesperson for the Foreign Ministry issued a statement saying that the country strongly condemned "the rocket and terror attacks from Gaza on Israel." On 18 October, Prime Minister Lee Hsien Loong, President Tharman Shanmugaratnam and Foreign Affairs Minister Vivian Balakrishnan sent condolence letters to their Palestinian counterparts after the Al-Ahli Hospital explosion and reiterated support the two-state solution. In response to a 11 November op-ed in The Straits Times by retired diplomat Bilahari Kausikan, Home Affairs Minister K. Shanmugam noted that Kausikan did not emphasise the illegal actions by Israel, saying: "The truth is that Israeli government actions have been contrary to international law, and oppressive to the Palestinians. One can say this while also accepting that parts of the Palestinian leadership has acted very badly, seeking the complete wipe-out of Israel."
- South Korea: The Foreign Ministry issued a statement saying that the government strongly condemned "the indiscriminate attacks on Israel from Gaza including rocket attacks", and called for "an immediate halt" to them.
- Sri Lanka: The Foreign Ministry expressed concern about the loss of life in both Israel and Gaza. President Ranil Wickremesinghe denounced Hamas's aggression, stating that criticism of Israel is not a valid justification for Hamas's attack. Sri Lanka voted against condemning Hamas at the United Nations.
- Syria: The Foreign Ministry said an agreement to normalize relations between Saudi Arabia and Israel was now impossible. Syria voted against condemning Hamas at the United Nations.
- Taiwan: The Foreign Ministry issued a statement saying that the country strongly condemned "the indiscriminate attacks against Israelis carried out by Hamas." It also said Taiwan stood "in solidarity with Israel" and denounced "all forms of terrorism", adding that their thoughts were "with the victims & families at this tragic juncture." On 23 October 2023, Taiwanese representative to Israel Lee Ya-Ping donated US$70,000 to Israeli NGO Pitchon-Lev as aid to Israeli soldiers and families affected by the war. Taiwanese President Tsai Ing-wen and Foreign Minister Joseph Wu condemned the April 2024 Iranian strikes against Israel.
- Tajikistan: The Foreign Ministry strongly condemned the acts of violence and called on the parties to immediately end the violence and begin dialogue to normalize the situation to prevent an escalation of tensions in the Middle East. Tajikistan voted against condemning Hamas at the United Nations.
- Thailand: Prime Minister Srettha Thavisin expressed his deepest condolences to the government and people of Israel, and condemned Hamas' attack. He also put the Royal Thai Air Force on standby to evacuate its citizens if needed. Deputy foreign affairs minister Jakkapong Sangmanee later said that the country's position was "one of neutrality" and that the government favoured "a solution that would allow Palestine and Israel to coexist."
- Timor-Leste: Timor-Leste voted to condemn Hamas at the United Nations.
- United Arab Emirates: The Foreign Ministry called for an immediate ceasefire. Later it condemned Hamas for its "serious and grave escalation" and its hostage taking.
- Uzbekistan: The Foreign Ministry called on the warring parties to take all measures to quickly end the armed confrontation and resolve the crisis through political and diplomatic means.
- Vietnam: Foreign Ministry spokesperson Phạm Thu Hằng said that the country was "deeply concerned over the escalating violence between Hamas and Israel [that has led to massive civilian casualties]" and called on relevant parties "exercise restraint, refrain from taking actions that complicate the situation, promtply resume negotiations to settle disagreements through peaceful measures, on the basis of international law and related resolutions of the United Nations Security Council, and ensure safety and legitimate interests of civilians." In a followed statement, the same figure stated that Vietnam "strongly condemns acts of violence against civilians, humanitarian facilities, and essential infrastructure in the Middle East conflict", while calling on both parties to "immediately cease fire, end the use of force, respect international humanitarian law, resume negotiations, and resolve differences through peaceful means."
- Yemen: The Foreign Ministry confirmed that the government was following the course of events and escalation taking place in the occupied Palestinian territories, and called for the protection of civilians and an end to the provocations of the Israel Defense Forces and their repeated attacks on the Palestinian people and their sanctities. It also affirmed the government's "firm" position to help achieve the aspirations of the Palestinian people for a decent life, and the establishment of their independent Palestinian state with East Jerusalem as its capital, in accordance with the Arab Peace Initiative and relevant international resolutions and legislation.

=== Europe ===
- Albania: Prime Minister Edi Rama and Foreign Minister Igli Hasani expressed strong condemnation of the attack and expressed solidarity with the victims, their families and all of Israel.
- Andorra: Prime Minister Xavier Espot issued a statement condemning the "terrorist attacks perpetrated in various locations in Israel", expressing "solidarity with the Israeli authorities and civilian population", as well as a call to "stop the escalation of violence and respect international humanitarian law and deploy all diplomatic efforts to protect the civilian populations of both Israel and Palestine".
- Armenia: The Foreign Ministry expressed its shock at the violence between Palestinians and Israelis and the targeting of civilians, saying that it was joining "the international community demanding an end to the violence".
- Austria: Foreign Minister Alexander Schallenberg announced the suspension of the delivery of 19 million euros ($20 million) of aid to Palestinian areas on 9 October in response to Hamas' attack and said that it would review its existing projects in Palestine. He also said that he would summon the Iranian ambassador to address Iran's "abhorrent reactions" to the attack.

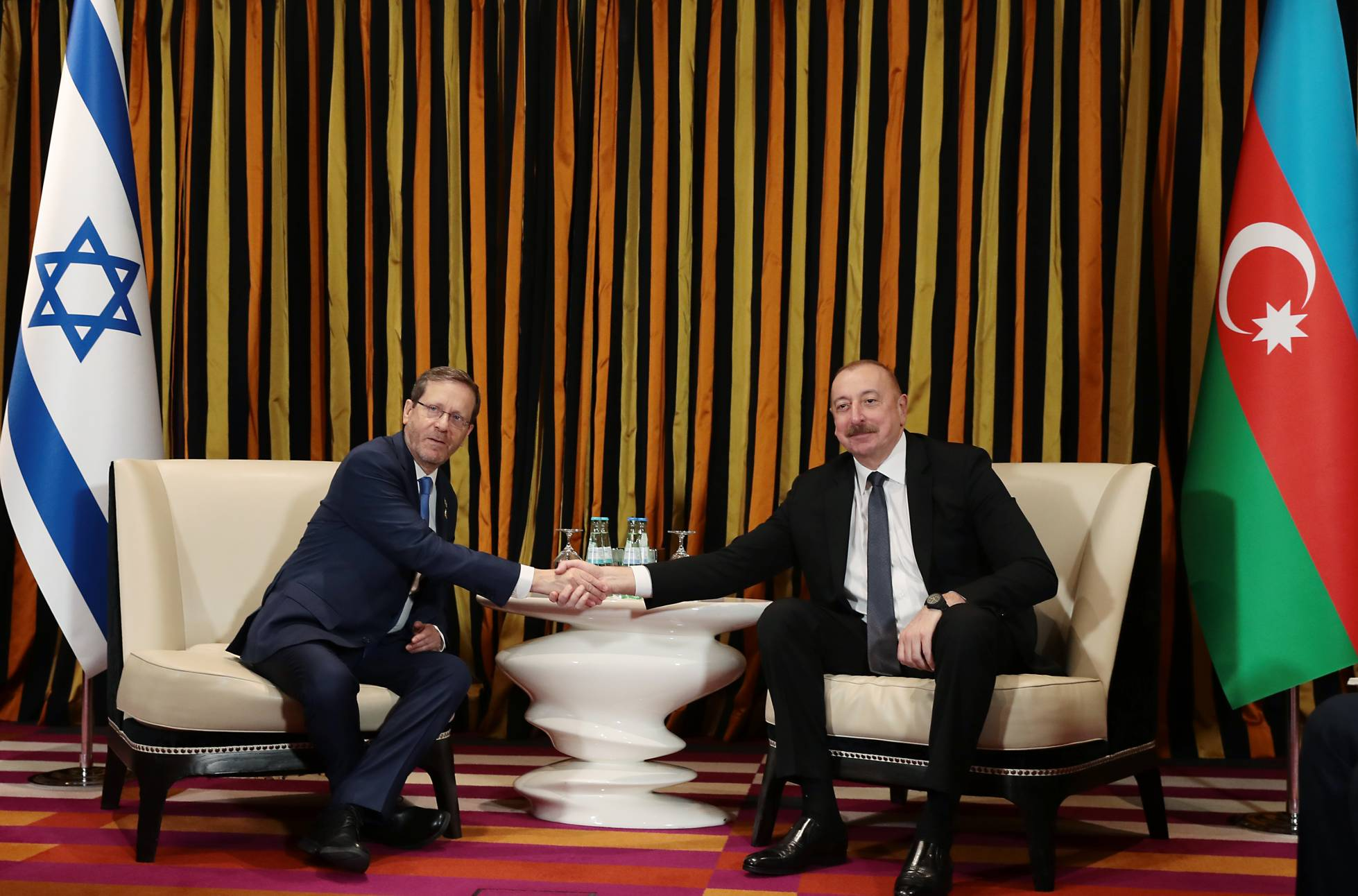
Azerbaijani President Ilham Aliyev with Israeli President Isaac Herzog, 16 February 2024

- Azerbaijan: The Foreign Ministry condemned "violence against civilians in the Israel-Palestine conflict zone" and called "for an urgent de-escalation of the situation". On 9 October, Azerbaijani Ambassador to Israel Mukhtar Mammadov condemned the "rocket strikes and terrorist attacks", adding he was appalled by numerous abductions of civilians, including women and children, who were abused by terrorist abductors. In February 2024, Azerbaijani President Ilham Aliyev met with Israeli President Isaac Herzog, reaffirming bilateral relations between Israel and Azerbaijan amid the ongoing war in Gaza. Azerbaijan is a major oil supplier to Israel and has resisted pressure to cut ties with Israel over the Gaza war.
- Belarus: The government called for restraint and dialogue by both parties. President Alexander Lukashenko criticized claims that Russia and Belarus had benefited from the situation through attention shifting away from the Russo-Ukrainian War, instead suggesting that the United States was the beneficiary of the conflict, and stated that Israeli Prime Minister Benjamin Netanyahu had been the "target of attacks for months and years" in domestic Israeli politics. He warned against further escalation, describing it as a "dangerous situation".
- Belgium: Foreign Minister Hadja Lahbib said on X that the country strongly condemned "the massive rocket attacks against Israeli civilians" and said that their "thoughts are with all those affected". On 8 November, Deputy Prime Minister Petra De Sutter called on the Belgian government to adopt sanctions against Israel and investigate the bombings of hospitals and refugee camps in Gaza. Likewise, Prime Minister Alexander De Croo called the Israeli bombing campaign in Gaza "disproportionate", but said that "Belgium will not take sides". On 23 November 2023, Prime Minister De Croo along with Spanish Prime Minister Pedro Sánchez held a press conference at the Rafah border crossing, emphasizing the importance of Israel's adherence to international humanitarian law.
- Bosnia and Herzegovina: Chairwoman of the Council of Ministers Borjana Krišto condemned Hamas' attacks as "unjust and brutal" and expressed support for Israel. Minister of Foreign Affairs Elmedin Konaković condemned Hamas as well, but also said that he never hid his "support for the people and government of Palestine in order to keep and protect the areas they live in, to fight for sovereignty and territorial integrity of their land and protect their religious objects on that area that are of great importance for the faithful from all around the world."
  - Federation of Bosnia and Herzegovina:
    - Canton 10: The cantonal government expressed shock and sadness at "the terrorist attack on the State of Israel", at the same time, the cantonal government issued a statement of support for Israel and "its efforts to establish peace for all its residents by all legitimate means".
    - Sarajevo Canton: Cantonal Prime Minister Nihad Uk "expressed sorrow and compassion" for Palestinians and offered the cantonal government's help "for the people in the occupied Gaza".
      - Sarajevo: Mayor Benjamina Karić said it was "hypocritical to condemn Hamas' attack on Israel, and not to condemn all that happened before and after it".
  - Republika Srpska: President Milorad Dodik condemned the attacks and expressed his support to Israel. The Palace of President of the Republic was decorated with the Israeli flag on 8 October.
- Bulgaria: Prime Minister Nikolai Denkov expressed his country's solidarity with the Israeli people and condemned Hamas's attack. The National Assembly building was lit up in the colors of the Israeli flag.
- Croatia: Prime Minister Andrej Plenković condemned the attacks referring to them as "terrorist acts against civilians" and expressed solidarity with Israel. Foreign Minister Gordan Grlić-Radman also condemned the attack and expressed solidarity with Israel. Following Israeli attacks on Gaza, president Zoran Milanović publicly stated that Israel had lost his sympathy due to its humanitarian crimes and "reprisal actions". He said on 18 October that the Palestinians deserve to have a state, which should have been respected a long time ago, and most of these horrors and ordeals would not have happened.
- Cyprus: President Nikos Christodoulides and the Cypriot embassy in Israel condemned the attacks and stated that Cyprus stood with Israel.
- Czech Republic: Prime Minister Petr Fiala condemned the attack, stating his thoughts were "with the innocent victims of the violence" and wishing "our friends in Israel the swiftest possible handling of the situation and the fulfilment of their ambitions to live in peace and security." Fiala participated in pro-Israel demonstrations in Prague and called the country "the voice of Israel in Europe." Czech Defense Minister Jana Černochová, in response to the ceasefire resolution, called for the Czech Republic to withdraw from the UN, which was rejected by Prime Minister Fiala, Foreign Minister Jan Lipavský and other cabinet officials.
- Denmark: Foreign Minister Lars Løkke Rasmussen strongly condemned the attack against Israel, adding that his thoughts were "with the victims, their families and all of Israel".
- Estonia: Marko Mihkelson, the Chairman of the Foreign Affairs Committee of the Riigikogu, strongly condemned the attacks against Israel, saying he was "concerned about the expansion of terrorist activity in the region". He invited international organisations to "confront the attempts of terrorist regimes to create instability and chaos in the whole Middle East region."
- Finland: Foreign Minister Elina Valtonen condemned in the strongest terms the "terrorist rocket attacks targeting Israel".

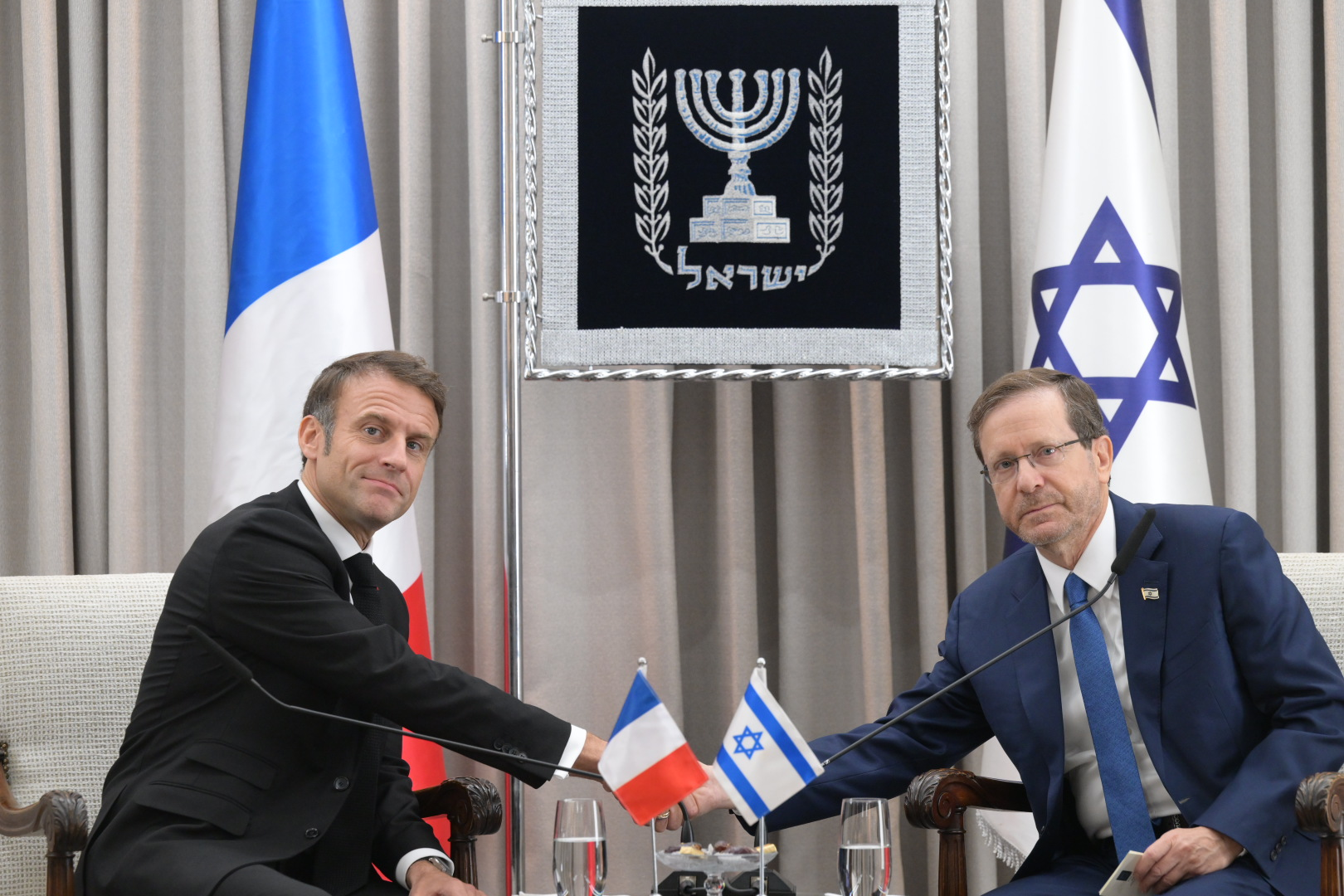
French President Emmanuel Macron with Israeli President Isaac Herzog in Jerusalem, 24 October 2023

- France: President Emmanuel Macron strongly condemned the attack and expressed his "full solidarity with the victims, their families and loved ones". The French embassy in Israel condemned the attacks and described Hamas' actions as "inadmissible terrorist attacks". On 25 October 2023, Macron said a "massive intervention that would put civilian lives at risk would be an error". On 10 November 2023, Macron called for a ceasefire and urged Israel to stop bombing Gaza and killing civilians. On 17 December 2023, French foreign minister Catherine Colonna called for an immediate ceasefire, adding that too many civilians were being killed in Gaza. On 20 December, Macron stated fighting terrorism did not mean flattening Gaza or attacking "civilian populations indiscriminately". In January 2024, Macron accused Hamas of using Palestinian civilians as human shields and said Israel had the right to defend itself. In July 2025, France together with more than two dozen Western countries including the United Kingdom called for an immediate end to the war in Gaza in a joint statement. In September 2026, French Foreign Minister Jean‑Noël Barrot announced on X that France, together with 11 other nations, would cease all commercial trade with Israeli settlements in the occupied Palestinian territories. Explaining the rationale behind the move, Barrot pointed to the "frenzied expansion of the settlements," a surge in violence carried out by extremist settlers against Palestinians, and acts of terrorism that, he noted, had also been condemned by Israeli authorities themselves. He further warned that the situation in the West Bank was "close to exploding," and stressed that the international community could no longer afford to stand by.
- Georgia: The Foreign Ministry strongly condemned the attack on Israel, and expressed solidarity with the Israeli government and people. The ministry also offered thoughts and condolences and wished a speedy recovery to the injured.
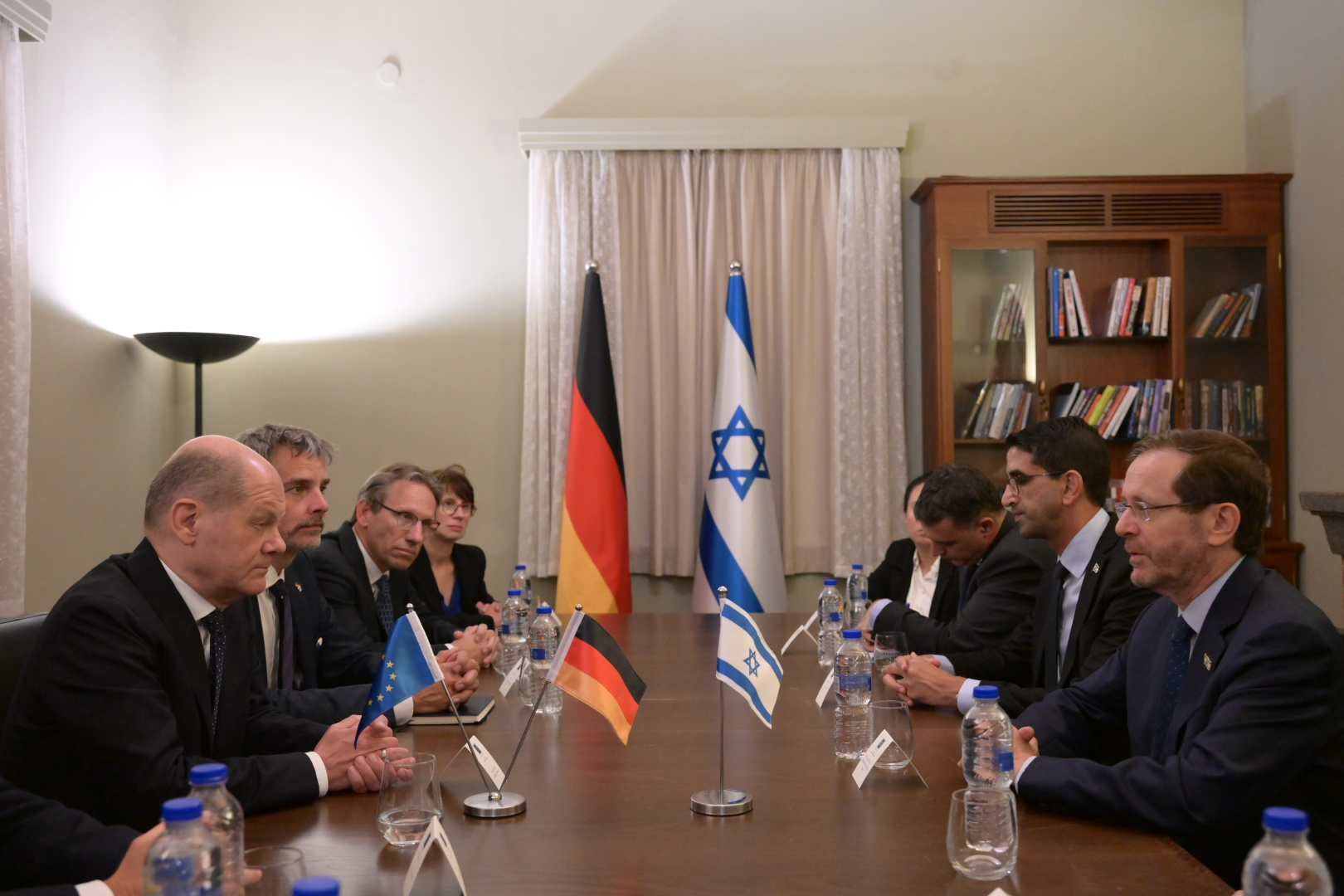
  German Chancellor Olaf Scholz with Israeli President Isaac Herzog in Tel Aviv, Israel, 17 October 2023

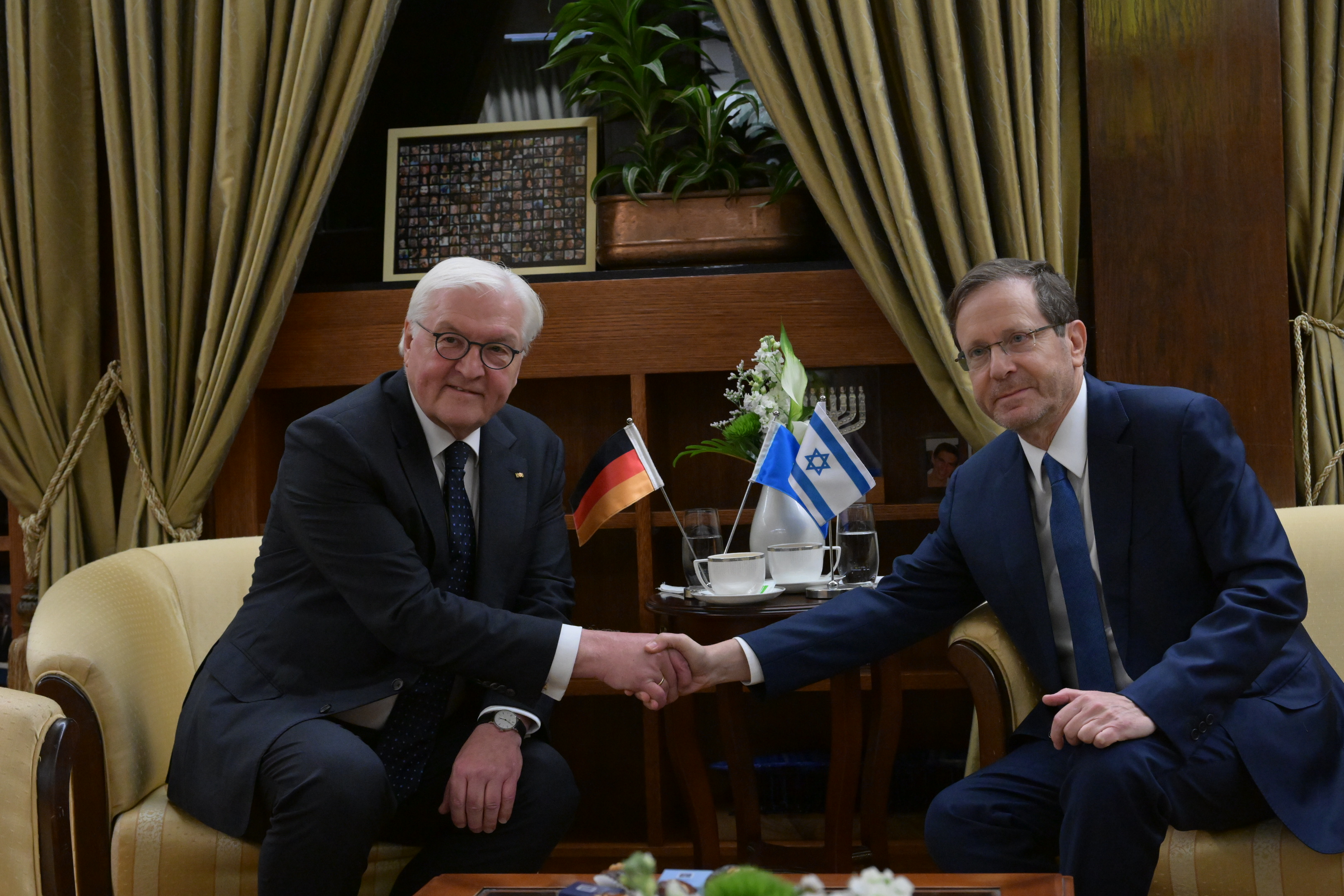
German President Frank-Walter Steinmeier with Israeli President Herzog in Jerusalem, 26 November 2023

- Germany: Chancellor Olaf Scholz said he was deeply shocked by the "terrifying news" of "rocket fire from Gaza and the escalating violence". He also said that Germany condemned Hamas' attack and would stand by Israel." Germany suspended €125 million ($131 million) of development aid to Palestine in response to Hamas' attack and said it would review other projects and aid given. Scholz offered military aid to Israel. Scholz later announced his opposition to an "immediate ceasefire" in Gaza, saying "that would mean ultimately that Israel leaves Hamas the possibility of recovering and obtaining new missiles," and called instead for "humanitarian pauses". On 17 December 2023, Minister for Foreign Affairs Annalena Baerbock said she would "support a ceasefire, but only if it is sustainable". President Frank-Walter Steinmeier called on Arabs living in Germany to distance themselves from Hamas.
- Greece: Prime Minister Kyriakos Mitsotakis strongly condemned the terrorist attack against Israel, that caused a high number of casualties among civilians. He also expressed his full support for the people of Israel and its right to self-defense. Migration minister Dimitris Keridis expressed his concerns of a resurgence in illegal immigrants to southern Europe, saying that the attack would "not ease illegal migration". On 18 January 2024, Prime Minister Mitsotakis asked Israel "not to create a new generation of orphans".
- Hungary: Prime Minister Viktor Orbán strongly condemned the attack against Israel, and stated that he unequivocally supported Israel's right to self-defence. He also expressed his "sympathy and condolences" to Prime Minister Benjamin Netanyahu, adding that "our thoughts and prayers are with the people of Israel in these dark hours".
- Iceland: Foreign Minister Þórdís Kolbrún R. Gylfadóttir condemned the attack and said that Israel has the right to defend itself.
- Ireland: Taoiseach Leo Varadkar strongly condemned Hamas' attacks against Israel, calling them "appalling" and expressed that Ireland unequivocally condemned attacks on civilians. Tánaiste, Foreign Minister, and Defence Minister Micheál Martin further condemned Hamas' "unconscionable" attacks, expressing that "deliberate and systematic targeting of civilians can never be justified". Both Varadkar and Martin called for an immediate cessation of all hostilities. President Michael D. Higgins subsequently issued a statement condemning the attacks as "deeply reprehensible" and expressed his support for Israel's right to defend itself. Varadkar and Martin also condemned Israel's conduct in Gaza; Varadkar described Israel as "collective[ly] punish[ing]" Gaza for crimes done by Hamas, saying that it violates international law. Martin also condemned what he viewed as collective punishment, saying that while Israel has the right to defend itself against Hamas, "Two wrongs don't make a right." He further said that Israel must stay "within the parameters of international humanitarian law", and that Israel's call to evacuate northern Gaza was "deeply dangerous and impossible to implement". On 14 February 2024, Taoiseach Varadkar along with Spanish Prime Minister Pedro Sánchez demanded in a joint letter to the EU Commission president Ursula von der Leyen and the EU's High Representative for Foreign Affairs and Security Policy Josep Borrell to assess whether Israel is complying with the obligations regarding human rights stipulated in the EU–Israel Association Agreement, and to take immediate measures in case of a breach in the agreement.
- Italy: Foreign Minister Antonio Tajani said the government condemned in the strongest terms the attacks on Israel; saying that "people's lives, the security of the region and the resumption of any political process are at risk." He also urged Hamas to "immediately stop this barbaric violence" and said that Italy supports "Israel's right to exist and defend itself". The Prime Minister's office released a statement saying that the government was "closely following the brutal attack taking place in Israel" and condemned "in the strongest terms the ongoing terror and violence against innocent civilians" It also said it supported "Israel's right to defend itself."
- Kosovo: President Vjosa Osmani denounced Hamas' assault, labeling it a "terrorist attack against the innocent people of Israel," and expressed unwavering solidarity with the State of Israel. Likewise, Prime Minister Albin Kurti unequivocally condemned the "terrorist attacks against Israel", adding that Kosovo stood in solidarity with those affected.

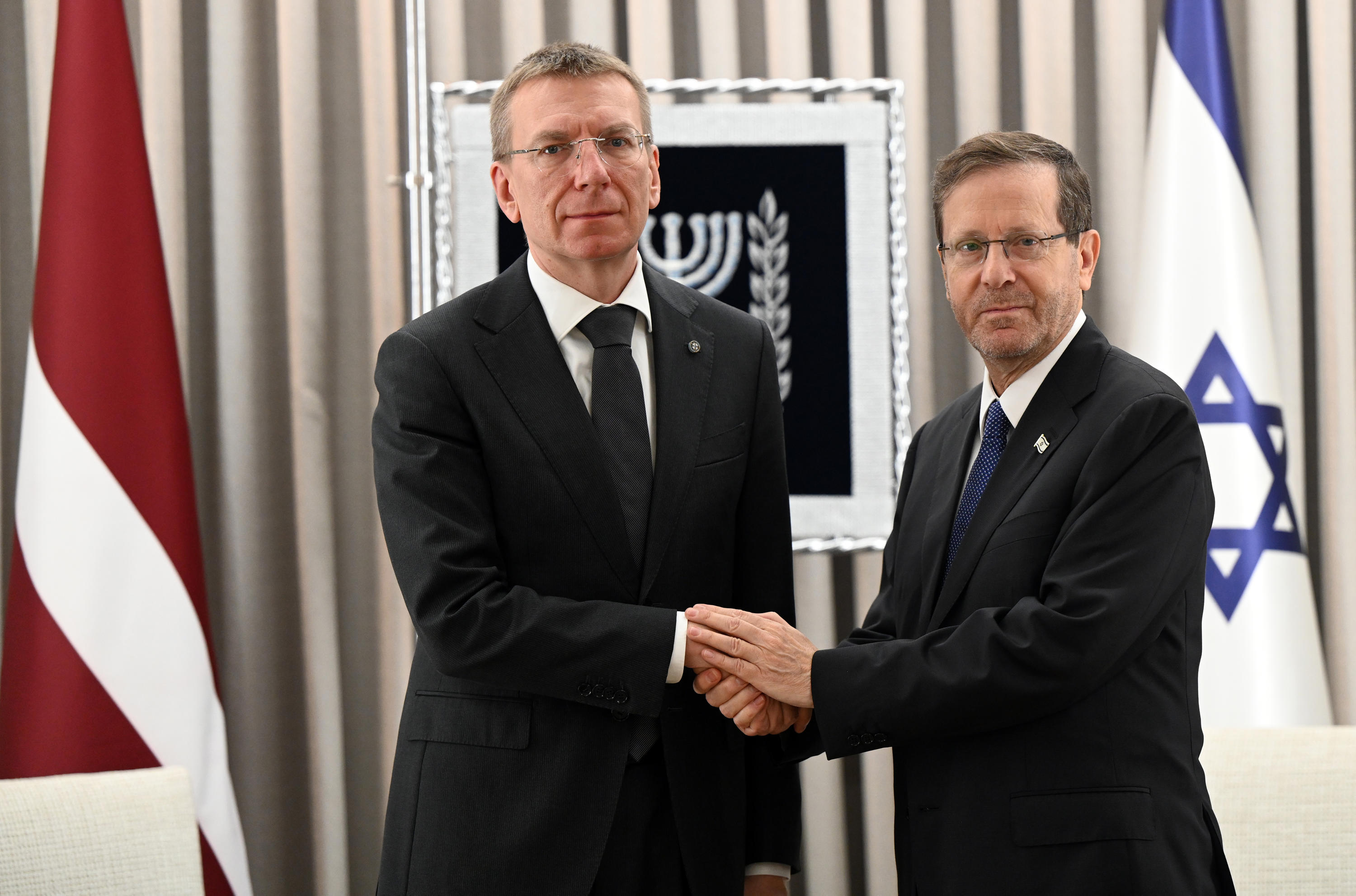
Latvian President Edgars Rinkēvičs with Israeli President Herzog in Jerusalem, 20 November 2023

- Latvia: President Edgars Rinkēvičs expressed his country's "unwavering support to Israel's legitimate right to defend itself against terrorists". Foreign Minister Krišjānis Kariņš accused Hamas of using Palestinian civilians as human shields.
- Liechtenstein: Liechtenstein voted to condemn Hamas at the United Nations.
- Lithuania: President Gitanas Nausėda said that the country unequivocally condemned Hamas attacks against civilians in Israel and said the country fully supported "Israel in these terrible hours", and expressed "condolences to the families of the victims". He also said that "Israel has the right to defend itself." The Seimas unanimously adopted a resolution condemning Hamas' attacks.
- Luxembourg: Foreign Minister Jean Asselborn condemned Hamas's attack, and underlined the need for a renewed international commitment to a two-state solution.
- Malta: The government called on the United Nations Security Council to hold a meeting regarding the conflict following the attacks.
- Moldova: President Maia Sandu strongly condemned "Hamas' attack against Israeli innocent civilians".
- Montenegro: President Jakov Milatović condemned "the attack carried out by Hamas against Israel" and expressed "his condolences for the Israeli lives lost in these attacks".
- Netherlands: Prime Minister Mark Rutte said he spoke with Prime Minister Netanyahu about the attack by Hamas on Israel and "told him that the Netherlands unequivocally condemns this terrorist violence and fully supports Israel's right to defend itself".
- North Macedonia: President Stevo Pendarovski condemned the "terrorist attacks launched against Israel and the killing of innocent civilians".

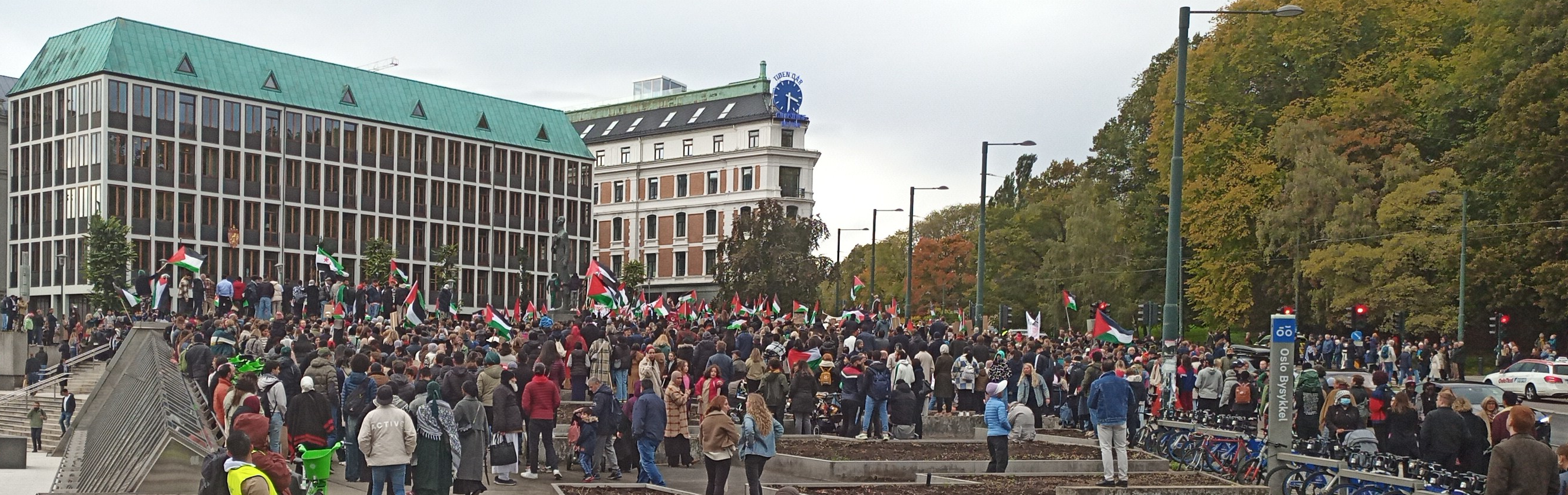
Solidarity demonstration for Gaza in front of the Norwegian Ministry of Foreign Affairs in Oslo on 14 October 2023

- Norway: Prime Minister Jonas Gahr Støre strongly condemned the attack against Israeli civilians, calling the situation "unprecedented". He said that "Israel has the right to defend itself against military attack" and that "it is important that the violence does not escalate". On 10 November 2023, Støre stated Israel's actions constituted a "violation of the international law of war".
- Poland: Foreign Minister Zbigniew Rau condemned "in the strongest terms the ongoing attacks by Hamas against Israel".
- Portugal: President Marcelo Rebelo de Sousa and Prime Minister António Costa condemned Hamas's attacks as "unacceptable" and deserving of "strong condemnation". Costa later urged Israel to respect the civilian population in Gaza while defending itself.
- Romania: President Klaus Iohannis strongly condemned the attack against Israel, adding that the country stood "in full solidarity with Israel in these terrible moments."
- Russia: President Vladimir Putin expressed condolences to the families of deceased Israelis, expressed concern over the catastrophic increase of the number of civilians killed in Israel and Gaza, and called the conflict "a clear example of the failure of U.S. policy in the Middle East", accusing the U.S. of failing to consider the "fundamental interests of the Palestinian people". Putin also described the Hamas attack as "unprecedented in its cruelty" and affirmed Israel's right to defend itself, but called for a two-state solution to resolve the conflict. Russian UN diplomats later condemned both the Hamas attack on Israel and the Israeli "non-discriminatory shelling of peaceful neighborhoods in Gaza". Russia hosted a Hamas delegation led by Mousa Abu Marzouk on 26 October, leading Israel to protest.
  Foreign Minister Sergei Lavrov said the "most reliable" solution for peace in Israel was the creation of a Palestinian state, and later added that the Israeli bombardment of Gaza was against international law. Russia voted against a resolution condemning Hamas at the United Nations General Assembly. As of 17 November, Russia had delivered 140 tons of humanitarian aid via plane to El-Arish Airport for people in Gaza. On 28 December 2023, Lavrov said Russia's goal to "de-Nazify" Ukraine was similar to Israel's goals in Gaza.
  - Chechnya: The republic's head Ramzan Kadyrov issued a statement supporting Palestine and expressing readiness to send in Chechen peacekeepers. On 20 October 2023, Kadyrov described Israel's actions in Gaza as an act of genocide against the Palestinian people.
- San Marino: Secretary for Foreign and Political Affairs Luca Beccari condemned the attacks on Israel.
- Serbia: President Aleksandar Vučić expressed his support for Israel and condemned "the horrific attacks on Israel." He added that "the Jewish people have endured a history of suffering and Israel deserves to live in peace and security".
- Slovakia: Defence Minister Martin Sklenár condemned the Hamas attacks in the "strongest terms" and supported Israel's right to self-defense.
- Slovenia: Prime Minister Robert Golob condemned the Hamas attacks. Golob became more critical of Israeli actions in Gaza as the conflict continued, calling for an international movement to recognize a Palestinian state. In May 2025, President Nataša Pirc Musar referred to the situation in Gaza as a "genocide". In July 2025, the government of Slovenia imposed an arms embargo on Israel.
- Spain: Prime Minister Pedro Sánchez strongly condemned what he called terrorism and demanded the immediate cessation of indiscriminate violence against the civilian population, likewise affirming Spain's standing commitment to regional stability. Deputy prime minister Yolanda Díaz called on the international community to put pressure on Israel to stop what she called a massacre in Gaza, while Minister of Social Rights Ione Belarra accused the EU and the US of "being complicit in Israel's war crimes" and called for Israel to be denounced before the International Criminal Court because of what she identified as ongoing "planned genocide" in the Gaza Strip against the Palestinian peoples. In November 2023, Sanchez criticized Israel's bombardment of the Gaza Strip and called for an "immediate ceasefire". He promised to "work in Europe and in Spain to recognise the Palestinian state". On 23 November 2023, Prime Minister Sánchez along with Belgian Prime Minister Alexander De Croo held a press conference at the Rafah border crossing, emphasizing the importance of Israel's adherence to international humanitarian law.
  On 26 January 2024, the Spanish government issued a statement celebrating the International Court of Justice's decision in regard of the Application of the Convention on the Prevention and Punishment of the Crime of Genocide in the Gaza Strip (South Africa v. Israel), calling on all parties "to respect and comply with these measures in their entirety". On 14 February, Prime Minister Sánchez along with Irish Taoiseach Leo Varadkar demanded in a joint letter to the EU Commission president Ursula von der Leyen and the EU's High Representative for Foreign Affairs and Security Policy Josep Borrell to assess whether Israel is complying with the obligations regarding human rights stipulated in the EU–Israel Association Agreement, and to take immediate measures in case of a breach in the agreement. In June 2024, Spain asked the International Court of Justice for permission to join South Africa's case.
- Sweden: Foreign Minister Tobias Billström condemned the attack against Israel, and said the government stood in solidarity with all civilians hurt by the attackers.
- Switzerland: The government condemned the attacks and asked for all parties to work toward a peaceful resolution. It also "underlined that de-escalation is the priority" and "called on those responsible to do everything possible to bring about a ceasefire and avoid a regional escalation".
- Turkey: At a congress for his ruling AK Party in Ankara, President Recep Tayyip Erdoğan called on Israelis and Palestinians to act with restraint and refrain from hostile acts that could exacerbate the situation. Erdoğan later refused to use the word "terrorist" to describe Hamas and instead called them a "liberation group". Erdoğan said that Israel's bombing and blockade of the Gaza Strip in retaliation for Hamas' attack was a disproportionate response amounting to a "massacre". On 25 October, Foreign Minister Hakan Fidan warned that an Israeli ground invasion of the Gaza Strip could turn into a massacre, saying that those supporting Israel's actions are "accomplices to its crimes". Turkey voted against condemning Hamas at the United Nations. On 4 November, Turkey recalled its ambassador to Israel "in view of the unfolding humanitarian tragedy in Gaza caused by the continuing attacks by Israel against civilians, and Israel's refusal (to accept) a ceasefire." In 2024, Turkish President Erdogan threatened Israel, stating that Turkey may enter Israeli territory just as it had done in Libya and Nagorno-Karabakh.
- Ukraine: Following the initial Hamas attack, the Foreign Ministry said Ukraine strongly condemned the "terrorist attacks" against Israel and expressed its "support for Israel in its right to defend itself and its people." On 9 October, Ukrainian military intelligence accused Russia of transferring Western-made weapons captured in Ukraine to Hamas to blame Ukraine for selling them. Following the Al-Ahli Arab Hospital explosion, Ukraine's Foreign Ministry called for an "investigation of this tragedy" to bring perpetrators to justice, called on all sides to abide by international humanitarian law, and supported a two-state solution to the conflict.

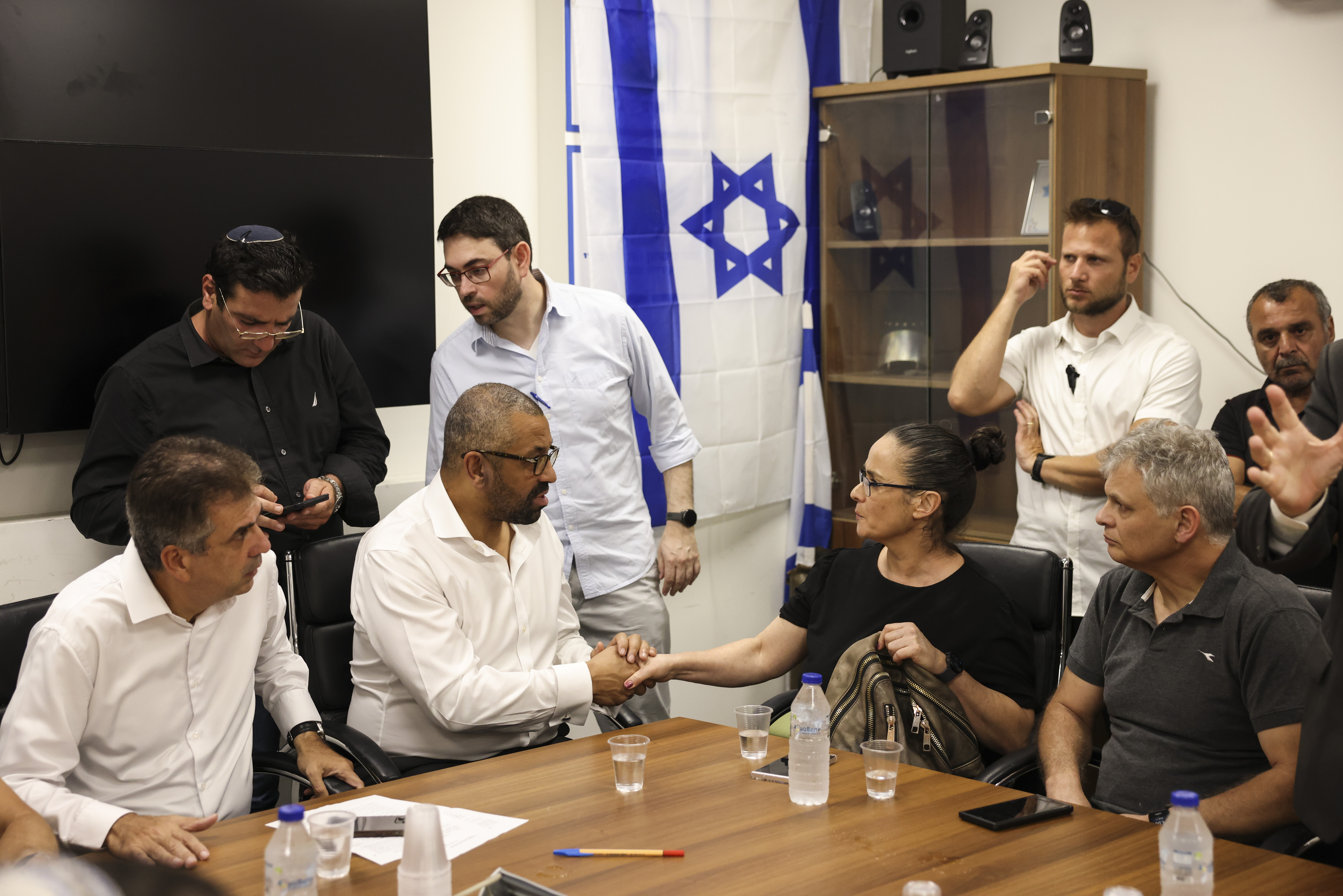
British Foreign Secretary James Cleverly in Israel, 11 October 2023

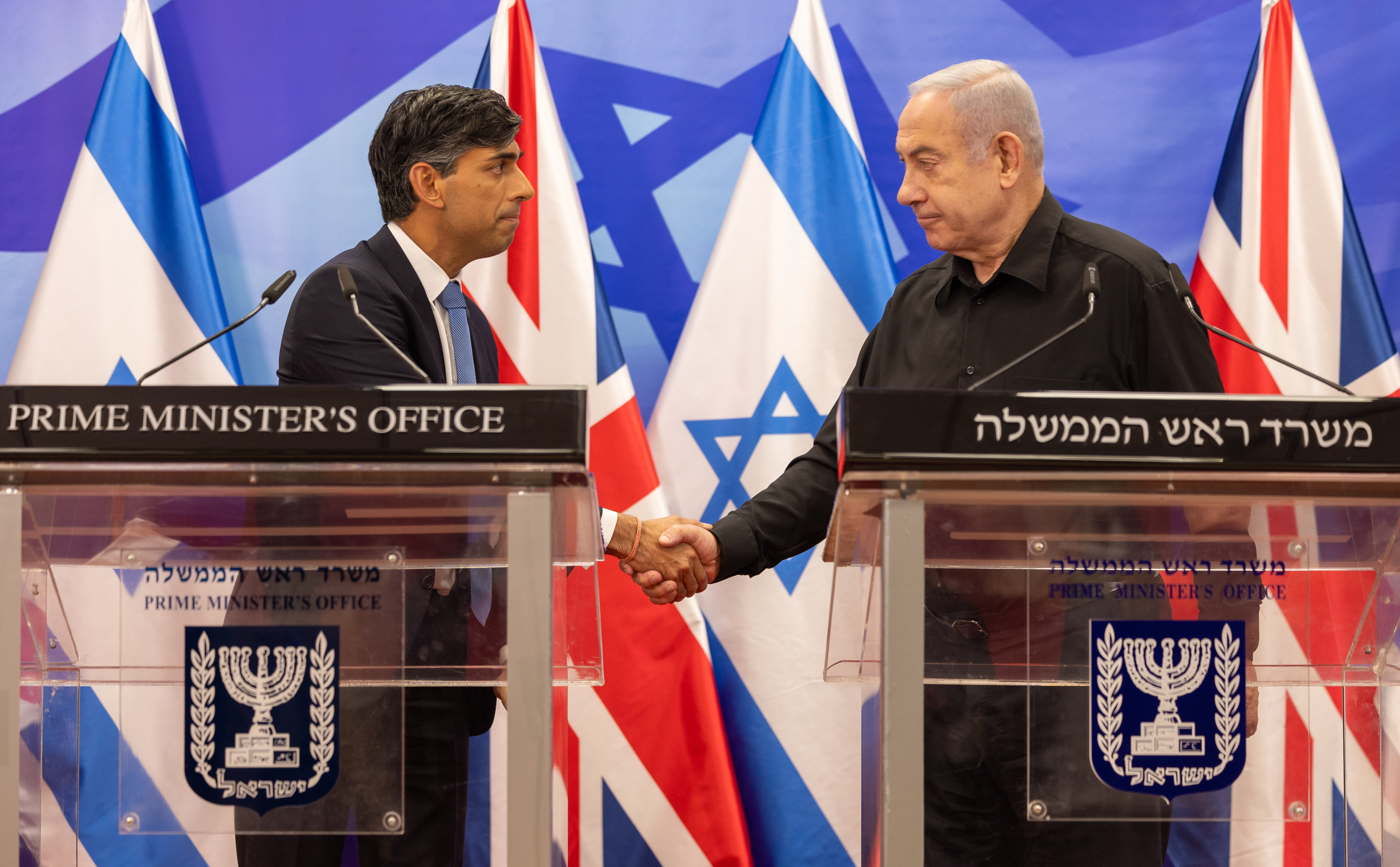
UK Prime Minister Rishi Sunak with Israeli Prime Minister Benjamin Netanyahu in Tel Aviv, Israel, 19 October 2023

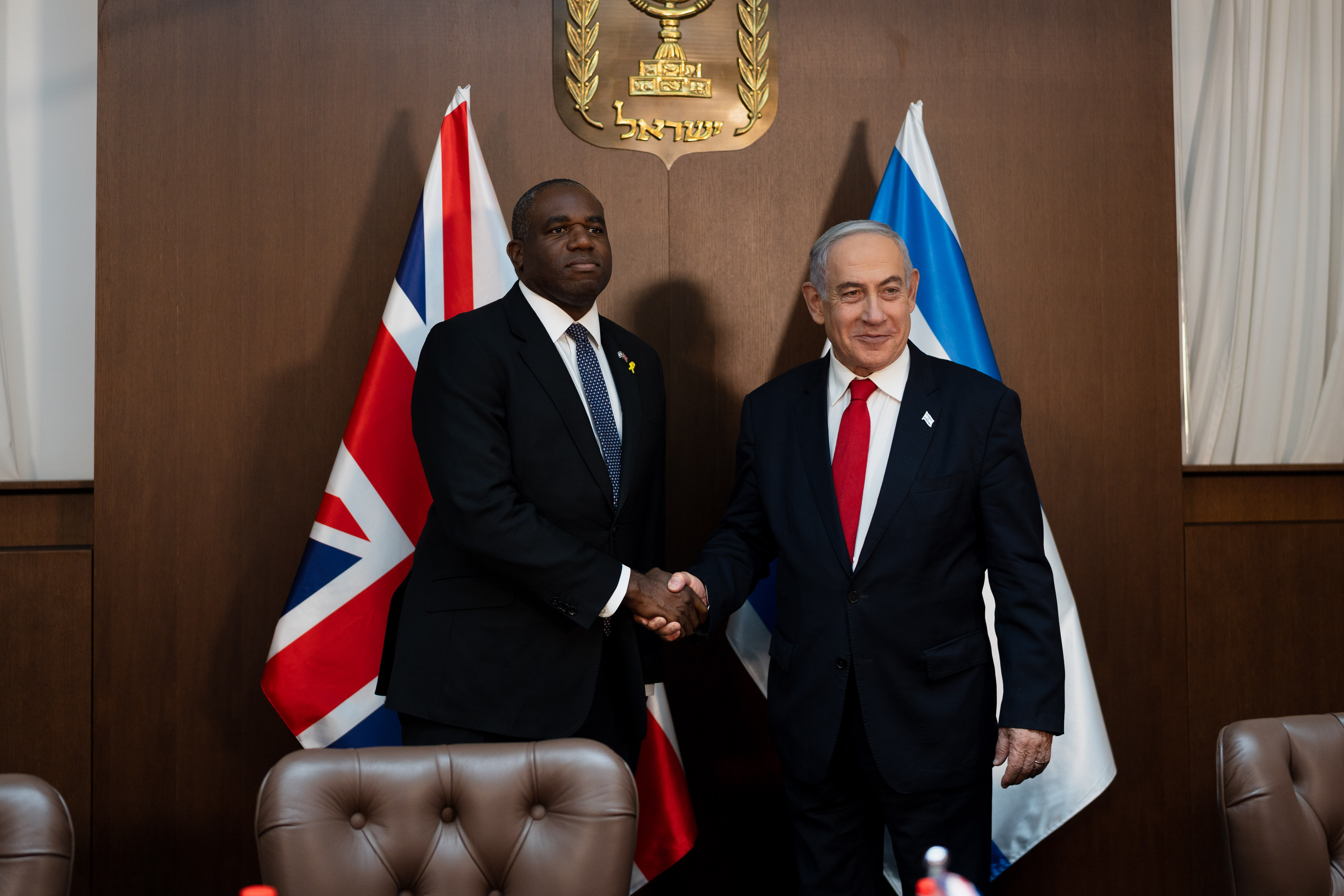
British Foreign Secretary David Lammy with Netanyahu in Jerusalem, Israel, 14 July 2024

- United Kingdom: Conservative Prime Minister Rishi Sunak said he was shocked by the initial Hamas attacks against Israeli citizens. He added that "Israel has an absolute right to defend itself" and said UK officials were "in contact with Israeli authorities," and advised British nationals in Israel to "follow travel advice". An illumination of the Israeli flag was projected onto the UK Prime Minister's residence at 10 Downing Street in London on 9 October. A statement issued by Buckingham Palace said that King Charles III was "appalled" and condemned the "barbaric acts of terrorism in Israel" and that the King's "thoughts and prayers are with all of those suffering, particularly those who have lost loved ones, but also those actively involved as we speak". On 11 October 2023, Foreign Secretary James Cleverly arrived in Israel in a show in solidarity, during which he was seen running for cover following an air raid alert while he was visiting the town of Ofakim later in the day. On 17 December 2023, Foreign Secretary David Cameron backed a "sustainable ceasefire" differentiated from a "general and immediate ceasefire", called for more aid to reach Gaza, and called for the Israeli government to "do more to discriminate sufficiently between terrorists and civilians". On 7 April 2024, Foreign Secretary David Cameron said that UK support for Israel was not unconditional. The Conservative government was replaced by a Labour government led by Keir Starmer in July 2024. Starmer said "The humanitarian situation in Gaza is simply unacceptable". Starmer issued a joint statement in May 2025 condemning Israel's renewed offensive against Gaza. The statement called for Israel to immediately stop its military operations and to immediately allow humanitarian aid into Gaza. It condemned Israel's plan to ethnically cleanse the Gaza Strip as "abhorrent" and against international law. He said his government would take "concrete actions" if Israel continued its "egregious actions". Foreign Secretary David Lammy called Israel's renewed offensive "morally unjustifiable". Referring to Israeli plans to ethnically cleanse the Gaza Strip, Lammy said "It is extremism, it is dangerous, it is repellent, it is monstrous, and I condemn it in the strongest possible terms". The UK is among 12 countries backing trade restrictions on illegal Israeli settlements in the occupied West Bank. In September 2026, Britain's foreign secretary said the UK would ban imports of goods from Israeli settlements, doing so in step with France and Canada. A broader sanctions regime is also planned. Britain made clear it can no longer just condemn injustice and suffering — it has to act. It also stated that the occupation of the West Bank is illegal, and that London believes "ethnic cleansing" of Palestinians is happening in parts of the West Bank. The UK backs the two-state solution, which Israel rejects.
- Scotland: First Minister Humza Yousaf condemned the attack by Hamas. Yousaf, whose wife is Palestinian, said that his parents-in-law were trapped in Gaza, adding that they had contacted them over the phone. In an interview with Al Jazeera, he called for a humanitarian corridor to be established in Gaza to allow vital supplies in and people to leave. He also said that while he understood Israel's reasons to protect itself, he did not believe that the price should be the "collective punishment of two million people".
  - England
    - London: Mayor Sadiq Khan said he had asked the UK government to support calls for humanitarian access to and from Gaza Khan urged Israel to exercise restraint, arguing that a blockade of the Gaza Strip could lead to "suffering" among Palestinian civilians.
  - Wales: The Welsh Parliament passed a Plaid Cymru motion calling for an immediate ceasefire on 8 November after the Labour-led Welsh government abstained and gave its backbenchers a free vote.
- Vatican City: Pope Francis called for peace between Israel and Palestine. Following the Angelus prayer on 8 October, he called for a halt to the fighting, and said that "terrorism and war do not lead to any solution, but only to the death and suffering of so many innocent people", adding that "war is always a defeat". He later urged Hamas to release all its hostages, and voiced concern over Israel's imposition of a total siege on Gaza while saying that it was the "right of those who are attacked to defend themselves", referring to the Israeli military response. On 22 November, he stated the conflict had gone beyond war into terrorism, and warned Israel it was "forbidden to respond to terror with terror". On 31 March, during his Easter address, he called for a ceasefire to the conflict and the return of all hostages in Gaza.

=== Oceania ===
- Australia: Foreign Minister Penny Wong said that "Australia unequivocally condemns the attacks on Israel by Hamas including indiscriminate rocket fire on cities and civilians." Prime Minister Anthony Albanese also strongly condemned the attacks. In July 2025, Australia and several other Western countries issued a joint statement calling for an immediate end to the war in Gaza.
  - New South Wales: Premier Chris Minns condemned the attacks. He also condemned a pro-Palestinian and anti-Israeli rally in Sydney where protesters chanted anti-Zionist slogans and lit flares. Minns also apologized for the arrest of a man who held an Israeli flag in the streets of Sydney, which police stated was for his own safety. and officially banned a planned second pro-Palestinian rally. The Sydney Opera House was lit up in blue and white in tribute to Israel.
  - Queensland: Premier Annastacia Palaszczuk condemned the attacks after it was announced that a pro-Palestinian rally would be taking place in Brisbane.
  - South Australia: Premier Peter Malinauskas condemned the attacks and shared photos on social media showing many landmarks in Adelaide lit up in solidarity with Israel.
  - Tasmania: Premier Jeremy Rockliff condemned the attacks. The Tasman Bridge in Hobart was lit up in blue and white for three nights in solidarity with Israel.
  - Victoria: Premier Jacinta Allan condemned the attacks from Hamas, which she labelled "terrorist attacks", and many landmarks in Melbourne lit up in solidarity with Israel. Initially, she did not label the violence as terrorism, a move that was highly criticized.
  - Western Australia: Premier Roger Cook condemned the attacks and urged Western Australians against flying to the Middle East to take up arms.
- Fiji: Prime Minister Sitiveni Rabuka condemned the "terrorist attacks by Hamas which targeted innocent non-combatants" and reaffirmed Fiji's support for Israel's right to "defend itself and its people". In June 2025, Fiji voted against a resolution calling for a ceasefire at the United Nations.
- Kiribati: Kiribati voted to condemn Hamas at the United Nations.
- Marshall Islands: The Marshall Islands voted to condemn Hamas at the United Nations.
- Micronesia: Micronesia voted to condemn Hamas at the United Nations. In June 2025, Micronesia voted against a resolution calling for a ceasefire at the United Nations.
- Nauru: The government condemned the attacks and the "taking of innocent civilians as hostages", further calling on the international community to "stand in solidarity and prayer with the State of Israel," while also supporting "Israel's right to defend itself." In June 2025, Nauru voted against a resolution calling for a ceasefire at the United Nations.
- New Zealand: Foreign Minister Nanaia Mahuta expressed deep concern at the outbreak of violence between Israel and Gaza. She called for the immediate halt to violence, the protection of all civilians, and the upholding of international humanitarian law. Prime Minister Chris Hipkins subsequently stated that New Zealand unequivocally condemned Hamas' terror attacks, stating that the target of civilians and hostage taking violated fundamental international humanitarian principles. Hipkins also stated Israel had the right to defend itself. On 25 October Carolyn Schwalger, New Zealand's Permanent Representative to the United Nations, delivered a statement to the United Nations Security Council calling for a "humanitarian pause" to allow Gazan civilians to receive aid and for the creation of safe zones. By 18 November, New Zealand had contributed a total of NZ$10 million to support humanitarian activities by the International Committee of the Red Cross and World Food Programme in Israel and the Palestinian Territories.
- Palau: President Surangel Whipps Jr. wrote to Israeli Prime Minister Benjamin Netanyahu where he condemned the attack by Hamas on Israel, calling it an "act of terror", further adding Palau's solidarity with Israel. In June 2025, Palau voted against a resolution calling for a ceasefire at the United Nations.
- Papua New Guinea: Prime Minister James Marape condemned the attacks in Israel. He also called on Hamas and other militant groups to resolve matters in relation to Israel through dialogue and called on Israel to consider its response to the attacks. In June 2025, Papua New Guinea voted against a resolution calling for a ceasefire at the United Nations.
- Solomon Islands: Solomon Islands voted to condemn Hamas at the United Nations.
- Tonga: Tonga voted to condemn Hamas at the United Nations. In June 2025, Tonga voted against a resolution calling for a ceasefire at the United Nations.
- Tuvalu: Tuvalu voted to condemn Hamas at the United Nations. In June 2025, Tuvalu voted against a resolution calling for a ceasefire at the United Nations.

== International organizations ==
- African Union: African Union Commission Chairperson Moussa Faki expressed his "utmost concern" at the situation and called for an immediate cessation of hostilities, additionally, he recalled that denial of the fundamental rights of the Palestinian people, particularly that of an independent and sovereign State, was the "main cause of the permanent Israeli-Palestinian tension."
- Arab League: The League said "Israel's continued implementation of violent and extremist policies is a time bomb depriving the region of any serious opportunity for stability in the foreseeable future."
- ASEAN: On 20 October, the bloc released a statement calling for an immediate end to violence and urged both parties to assure the security of civilians and create a humanitarian corridor. It also urged the international community to pursue a peace process between Israel and Palestine. It reaffirmed its "support for a negotiated two-State solution" to the Israeli–Palestine dispute.
- BRICS: In a virtual summit chaired by South African President Cyril Ramaphosa, the grouping denounced attacks on civilians in Palestine and Israel, with many leaders calling the forced displacement of Palestinians, within Gaza or outside the territory, "war crimes."

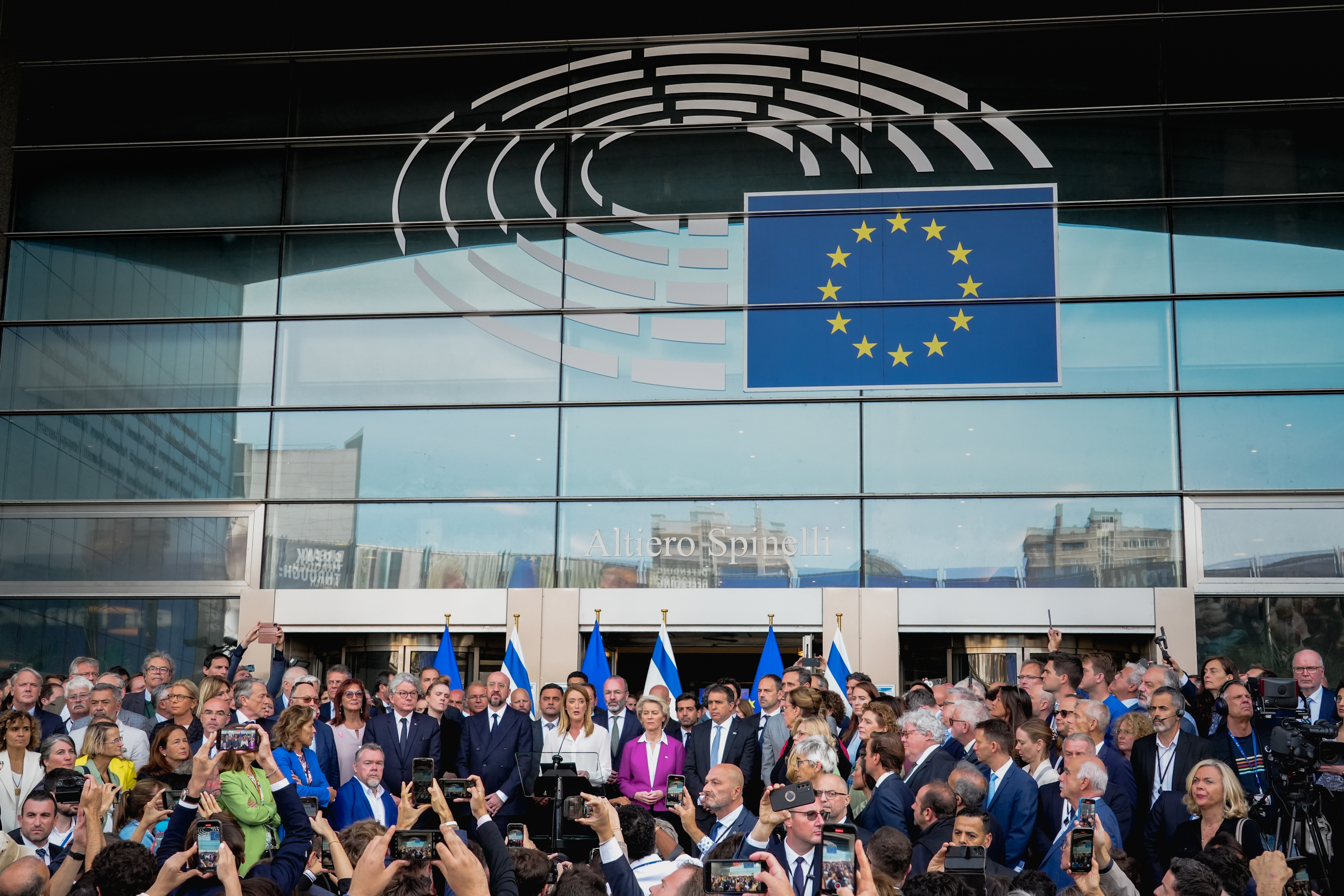
Gathering in support to Israel in front of the European Parliament in Brussels in presence of Roberta Metsola, Ursula von der Leyen, Charles Michel and members of the Parliament, 11 October 2023

- European Union: President of the European Commission Ursula von der Leyen said she "unequivocally" condemned "the attack carried out by Hamas terrorists against Israel", calling it "terrorism in its most despicable form" and saying "Israel has the right to defend itself against such heinous attacks". EU ambassador to Israel Dimiter Tzantchev condemned the attack. Israeli flags were raised outside the headquarters of the European Commission and the European Parliament in Brussels, while the latter's president Roberta Metsola led a vigil in the chamber on 11 October to commemorate the Israeli victims of the attack which also featured a minute's silence and a rendition of the Israeli national anthem. On 9 October, ahead of the EU council meeting convened to define a common EU position, EU Enlargement Commissioner Oliver Varhelyi announced on X that the European Commission would be suspending immediately all payments due in developmental aid to Palestine. The consensus emanating from the 9 October ministers meeting was a resolution condemning attacks by Hamas but also calling "for the protection of civilians and restraint, the release of hostages, for allowing access to food, water and medicines to Gaza in line with international humanitarian law". The announcement by Varhelyi was criticized by the foreign ministers of several EU members state such as Spain, Ireland, Belgium and Luxembourg who insisted that only individual countries could make such decisions. The bloc corrected Varhelyi's announcement and said that it would review payments instead to prevent misuse. In the United Nations General Assembly vote on the resolution calling for an immediate and sustained humanitarian truce and cessation of hostilities, eight EU states voted in favour, four against and 15 abstained. Ursula von der Leyen and other European leaders were reluctant to impose sanctions on Israel despite clear violations of international law. On 26 January 2024, the EU Commission and the High Representative issued a joint communication endorsing the International Court of Justice's order on South Africa's request for the indication of provisional measures in regard of the Application of the Convention on the Prevention and Punishment of the Crime of Genocide in the Gaza Strip (South Africa v. Israel), noting that "Orders of the International Court of Justice are binding on the Parties and they must comply with them".
- NATO: Spokesperson Dylan White said that the bloc condemned "terrorist attacks by Hamas against NATO partner Israel" and that "Israel has the right to defend itself". In the United Nations General Assembly vote on the resolution calling for an immediate and sustained humanitarian truce and cessation of hostilities, nine NATO member states voted in favour, four against and 18 abstained.

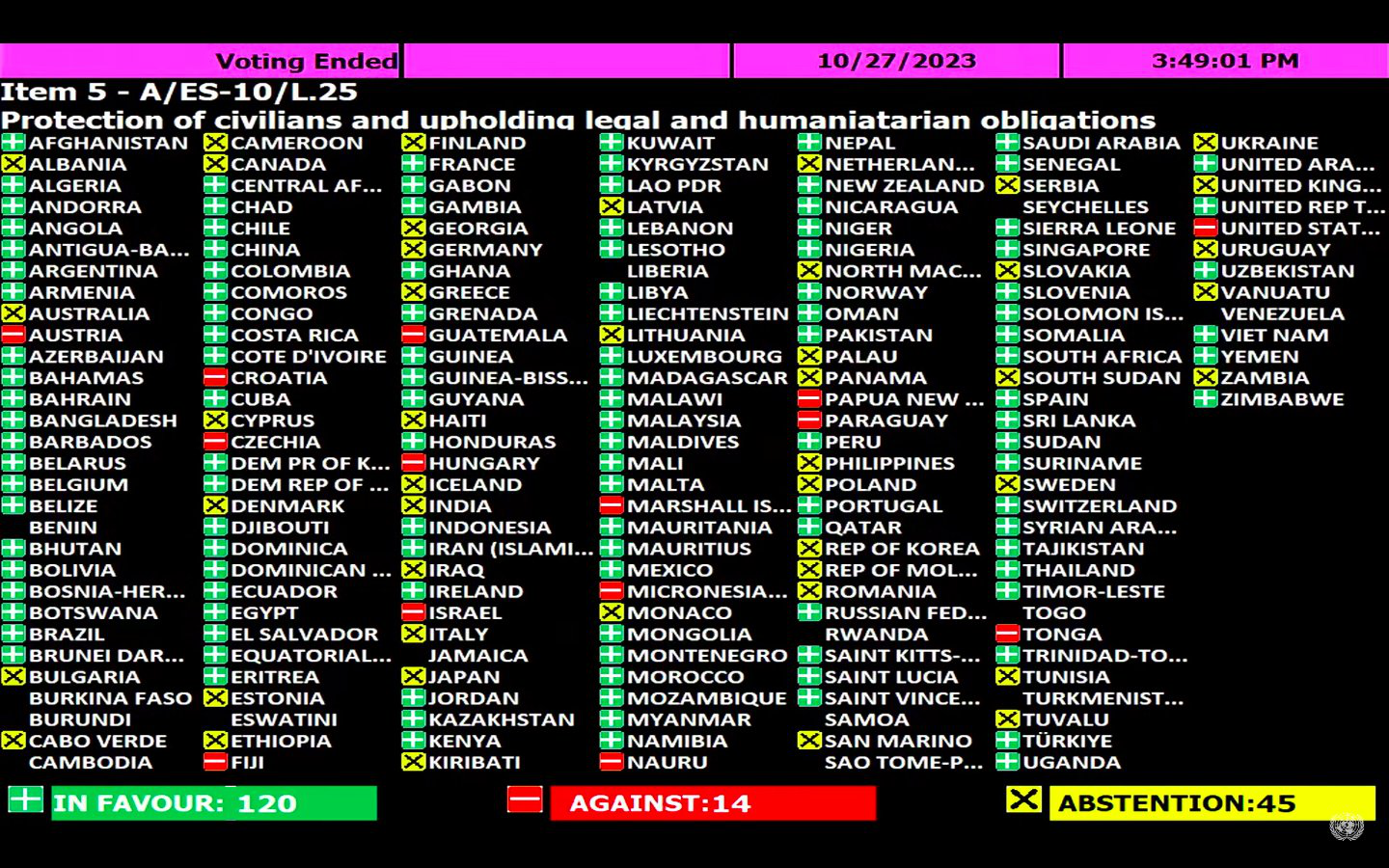
On 27 October, the United Nations General Assembly passed Resolution ES-10/21 calling for an "immediate and sustained" humanitarian truce and cessation of hostilities.

- United Nations: The United Nations Special Coordinator for the Middle East Peace Process Tor Wennesland condemned the attack, stating that the "events have resulted in horrific scenes of violence and many Israeli fatalities and injuries, with many believed to be kidnapped inside the Strip". He also urged that the "heinous attacks targeting civilians must stop immediately". The United Nations Interim Force in Lebanon said it was enhancing its presence near the border with Israel, including "counter rocket-launching operations". UN High Commissioner for Human Rights Volker Türk criticized Israel's imposition of a total siege on Gaza, saying that such a move was "prohibited under international law". UN Secretary-General António Guterres condemned the actions of Hamas, but said he was "deeply distressed" by Israel's decision to impose a total blockade on the Gaza Strip. On 27 October 2023, the United Nations General Assembly passed a resolution calling for an immediate and sustained humanitarian truce and cessation of hostilities, adopted by a vote of 121 states to 14, with 44 abstentions. On 13 November, UN flags in offices in Bangkok, Tokyo and Beijing were set at half-mast while staff observed a minute's silence in memory of employees killed in Gaza. On 27 March, Francesca Albanese, the United Nations Special Rapporteur on the occupied Palestinian territories, stated that there are "reasonable grounds" to believe that Israel is committing genocide in Gaza. In a report by investigators from the UN's Commission of Inquiry, Israel and Hamas have been accused of committing war crimes and human rights abuses since 7 October 2023. In November 2024, the United Nations Special Committee, wrote in a report covering the period to July 2024: "Through its siege over Gaza, obstruction of humanitarian aid, alongside targeted attacks and killing of civilians and aid workers, despite repeated UN appeals, binding orders from the International Court of Justice and resolutions of the Security Council, Israel is intentionally causing death, starvation and serious injury," (...) "using starvation as a method of war and inflicting collective punishment on the Palestinian population" (...) "consistent with the characteristics of genocide".
- In 2023, the Prosecutor of the International Criminal Court, Karim Ahmad Khan, stated that "the attacks against innocent Israeli civilians on Oct. 7 represent some of the most serious international crimes that shock the conscience of humanity, crimes which the ICC was established to address". He noted that Israel has a "robust system intended to ensure compliance with international humanitarian law", and reiterated the importance of letting humanitarian aid into Gaza. On 20 May 2024, on the advice of a panel of ICC experts, Khan applied for arrest warrants for Israeli Prime Minister Benjamin Netanyahu and Hamas's leader in Gaza, Yahya Sinwar. He also applied for arrest warrants for two other Hamas members, Ismail Haniyeh and Mohammed al-Masri, and the Israeli defence minister Yoav Gallant.
- In May 2024, judges of the International Court of Justice called on Israel to halt its intended military offensive in the city of Rafah.
- UNICEF: On 13 November, UNICEF stated more than 700,000 children in Gaza were displaced.
- Non-Aligned Movement: On 19 January, the bloc criticised Israel's war on Gaza at a summit in Kampala and adopted a resolution calling for a ceasefire.

=== Political internationals and transnational political alliances ===
- Liberal International: The bureau of the network of liberal parties worldwide said it stood "in solidarity with the people of Israel" and condemned the "attacks against civilians in the south of the country and recognises Israel's right to defend itself". It also said the Hamas's attacks "do not serve the interest of the Palestinian people."
  - Renew Europe said it was "horrified by the senseless terrorist attacks against the people of Israel and stand with them at this difficult time. There is no justification for barbaric attacks against innocent civilians."
  - The Alliance of Liberals and Democrats for Europe said it was asserting its "firm and unyielding support for Israel in these critical moments. Israel, a pivotal democratic ally, not only possesses the right but is also obligated under international law to safeguard its citizens against such acts of terror."
- The Progressive Alliance of Socialists and Democrats said it was "horrified by the terrorist attacks Hamas has committed against innocent Israelis" and called for Hamas to end its violence and immediately release all those it kidnapped.
  - The Party of European Socialists announced its "solidarity to all Israelis" and condemned "this large-scale, indiscriminate, assault on citizens and communities", while calling on "Hamas to stop the attacks immediately. Terrorism is never the answer."
- The Greens–European Free Alliance condemned "the violent terrorist attacks by Hamas in the strongest terms," and called "for an immediate stop to this violence" and renewed "efforts towards deescalation and peace".
- Centrist Democrat International expressed "its resounding rejection of terrorism as a means of political action" and condemned "the cruel attack by Hamas against the people of Israel".
  - The European People's Party strongly condemned the "atrocious attack against Israel" and said "the country has a right to defend itself & its citizens from violent terrorist actions which achieve nothing but devastating loss of life, division & destruction."
- The International Democracy Union expressed "full solidarity with the State of Israel and its people" and said "Israel has the right to defend itself against these terrorist attacks and has our full support."
  - The European Conservatives and Reformists strongly condemned "the unprecedented terror attacks on Israel coming out of Gaza, including the execution-style killings and kidnappings of Israeli civilians and soldiers" and said "the violence perpetrated by Hamas shows that one cannot negotiate with terrorists."
- The Identity and Democracy group condemned the attack, expressed "unwavering solidarity with Israel and its people" and reaffirmed Israel's right to defend itself from terror attacks.

== Political parties ==
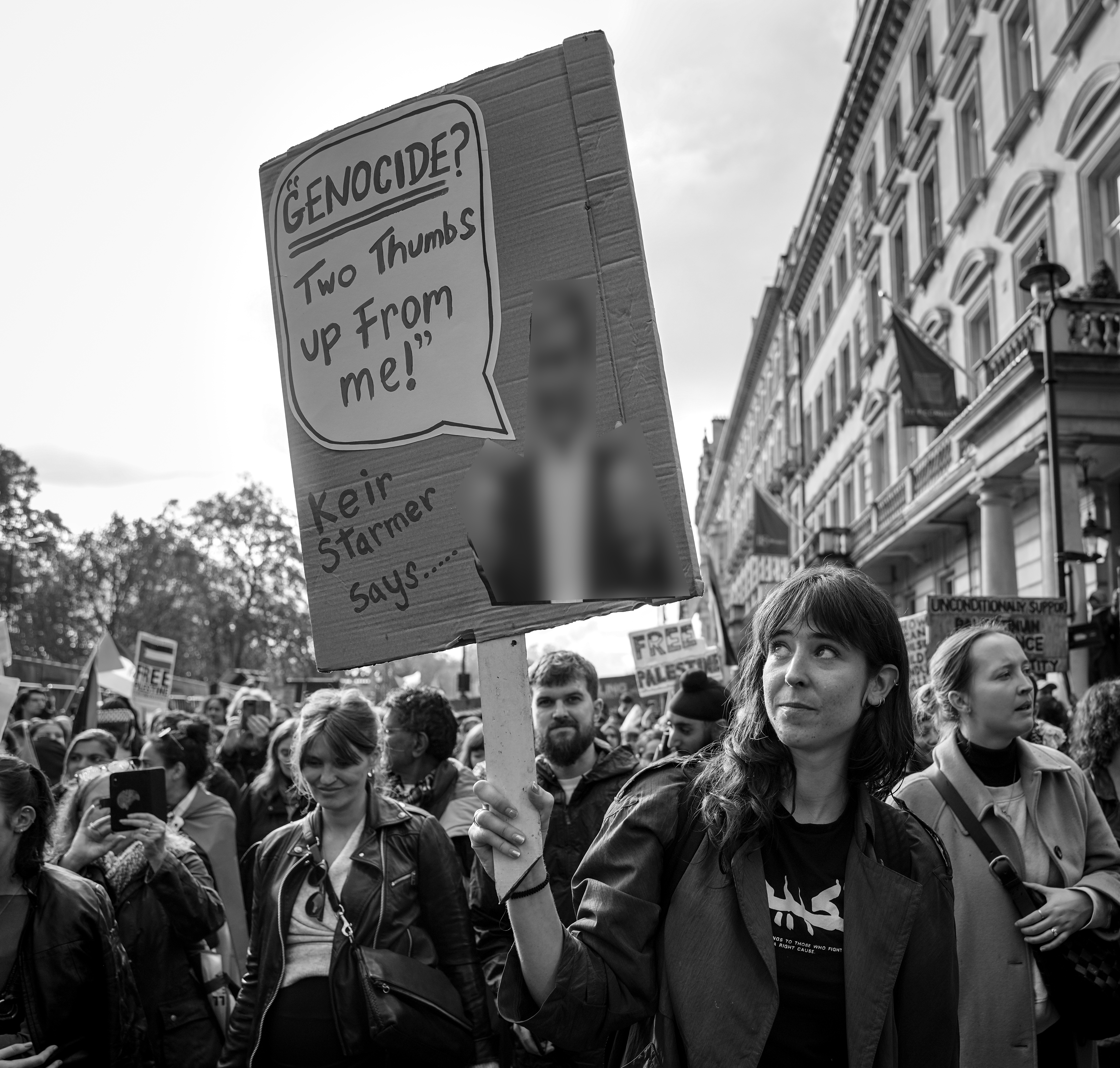
The Labour Party (UK) under Keir Starmer suspended several parliamentary candidates and MPs for comments they made about Israel.

=== Africa ===
South Africa

- The Democratic Alliance condemned "Hamas' unprovoked attack" and urged an "immediate end to violence" and return to negotiations to end the conflict.
- The Economic Freedom Fighters expressed their support for Hamas and pledged to send arms to Hamas should they win the 2024 general election.
- The Patriotic Alliance and the Freedom Front Plus stated their support for Israel.

=== Americas ===
Brazil

- The Socialism and Liberty Party condemned the attacks as a genocide.
- The Workers' Cause Party provided "unwavering support" to Hamas and stated that "the regime imposed by the Israelis in Palestine is no less brutal than the Nazis themselves".
- The Workers' Party referred to the Israeli actions in Gaza as genocide while stating that the Palestinian militants' attack on civilian areas was "unacceptable".

United States: The Green Party announced its condemnation of attacks on civilians and demanded an immediate ceasefire.

=== Asia ===
Bangladesh

- The Workers Party, Jatiya Samajtantrik Dal, Ganatantri Party, National Awami Party (Muzaffar), and other pro-Awami League leftist political parties staged demonstrations altogether in support of Palestine. In a march under the banner of the 'Bangladesh Peace Council' on 12 October, leaders of these parties criticized the Foreign Ministry's initial statement as 'duplicity' and 'ambivalent'. They also termed the Operation Al-Aqsa Deluge as a 'defensive operation' and compared it to the Bangladesh Liberation War
- The Bangladesh Jamaat-e-Islami organized a rally denouncing the Israeli assault on Gaza and calling upon the Muslim world to safeguard the well-being and rights of the Palestinian people. The party orchestrated a procession in Dhaka, during which its leaders expressed strong condemnation towards Israel for cutting off power and water supply to Gaza.

Syria: The rebel anti-Assad Syrian National Army (SNA), previously the Free Syrian Army (FSA), expressed sympathy for the Palestinian people in the Gaza Strip, comparing Israel's attacks in Gaza to attacks on rebel-held areas in Syria's Idlib Governorate.

Turkey: The Kurdistan Workers' Party (PKK) condemned the Israeli actions as "genocide".

=== Europe ===
Bosnia and Herzegovina

- The Croatian Democratic Union of Bosnia and Herzegovina condemned Hamas' attacks on Israel as well as justifications and relativisations of Hamas' terrorist acts by certain politicians in Bosnia and Herzegovina.
- The Party of Democratic Action condemned the killings of innocent people and called on the United Nations and other international actors to help resolve the Palestinian issue through dialogue. They also asked for a cessation of the "violence of the Israeli military over the civilians in Gaza, non-selective rocket attacks, the announcement of a ground invasion and the requests for dislocation of more than a million of Palestinians in Gaza".

United Kingdom: The Labour Party under Keir Starmer suspended several parliamentary candidates and MPs, including Graham Jones, Andy McDonald, Azhar Ali and Kate Osamor, for comments they made about Israel. Jones said Britons who go to Israel to fight for the Israel Defense Forces "should be locked up". Osamor wrote that there was an "international duty" to remember the victims of the Holocaust and that "more recent genocides in Cambodia, Rwanda, Bosnia and now Gaza" should also be remembered.

=== Oceania ===
New Zealand

- New Zealand National Party leader Christopher Luxon and ACT New Zealand leader David Seymour condemned Hamas for attacking Israeli civilians.
- Green Party of Aotearoa New Zealand's foreign affairs spokesperson Golriz Ghahraman condemned the targeting of civilians and urged both Palestinian armed groups and Israeli forces to protect civilians.
- On 18 October, Te Pāti Māori (Māori Party) advocated the expulsion of the Israeli ambassador if Israel did not implement a ceasefire or open a humanitarian corridor in Gaza.

== Islamist groups ==
- Hezbollah: The group congratulated Hamas and praised the attack as a response to "Israeli crimes", adding that the militants had "divine backing". It also said its leadership in Lebanon was in contact with Hamas about the operation. On 11 October, the group said that "sending aircraft carriers to the region will not frighten the resistance factions ready for confrontation until victory is achieved", referring to the deployment of two US carrier strike fleets to the eastern Mediterranean. Hezbollah warned that a ground invasion of the Gaza Strip could result in a wider conflict in the Middle East.
- Houthi movement: The group's Ansarullah Political Bureau stated that "Operation Al-Aqsa Flood revealed the weakness, fragility, and impotence of the temporary Zionist entity while showing the strength and effectiveness of the resistance in Palestine and its ability to strike the Israeli depth". It also said that the Yemenis stood with the Palestinians and resistance movements explaining that they were ready to participate in the battle to defend Palestine and the nation's sanctities against the "usurping" Zionist entity. Houthi leader Abdul-Malik al-Houthi warned that any intervention in Gaza by the United States would result in a Houthi intervention.
- (Islamic State) Al-Shabaab: The group congratulated the Palestinian militants, saluting "all the brave heroes, the brave commandos, and all those stationed in the Holy Land". It also called on Muslims to wage Jihad against "Jews and their allies".
- AQIM and JNIM: Two branches of al-Qaeda, al-Qaeda in the Islamic Maghreb and Jama'at Nasr al-Islam wal Muslimin, released a joint statement praising the attacks on Israel and encouraging Hamas and other Palestinian militant groups to inflict further violence on Jews.
- Islamic State (commonly known as ISIS or Daesh): The group released instructions on its official newspaper Al-Naba, on "practical steps to fight the Jews" worldwide and "support Muslims in Palestine", including "targeting Jewish temples". However, it also criticized Hamas for its narrowed focus on Israel and connections to Iran.
- Pakistani Taliban: The group urged Muslims worldwide to aid Palestinians and called Hamas' attack on Israel "extremely joyous and encouraging news about the oppressed Muslim Ummah".
- Tahrir al-Sham: The group's clerics held prayers for a Palestinian victory and said it celebrated Hamas' jihad while condemning its ties with Shiite-led Iran. The group expressed support for the right of the Palestinian people to reclaim their land.

== Charities and NGOs ==
- Indonesian NGO Medical Emergency Rescue Committee (MER-C) condemned Israel after reporting that Israel had targeted its hospital in Gaza and killed one of its personnel.
- Following the Israeli airstrike on the Indonesian Hospital, Doctors Without Borders urged "all parties to respect health infrastructures".
- Mercy Malaysia, in solidarity with Palestine, confirmed it was monitoring the situation in Gaza and was exploring opportunities to provide aid in the form of health assistance, psychosocial support, and medical supplies.
- The Egyptian Red Crescent sent more than two tons of medical supplies to the Gaza Strip.
- The Uyghur Human Rights Project stated that it "condemns in the strongest terms possible the barbaric attacks by Hamas terrorists on innocent Israelis".
- The World Uyghur Congress released a statement condemning "horrific attacks by Hamas against Israeli civilians".
- The Jewish Federations of North America announced a $500 million fundraising campaign to help Israel.
- A Doctors Without Borders video shared by Amnesty International head Agnès Callamard stated, "This brutal annihilation of an entire populations health system stretches beyond what humanitarian aid can fix." On 4 December, Red Cross president Mirjana Spoljaric Egger visited the Gaza Strip, stating, "the things I saw there are beyond anything that anyone should be in a position to describe." On 10 December, Bushra Khalidi, an expert with Oxfam, stated the situation was no longer "just a catastrophe, it's apocalyptic."
- On 27 December, an MSF representative stated, "You absolutely cannot depict this as a humanitarian response: When we cannot guarantee the safety of our teams". Mairav Zonszein, a Crisis Group analyst, stated, "It is clear Israel's war objective is not eradicating Hamas, but eradicating the ability to live in Gaza."
- Gisha, an Israeli human rights organization, stated, "The catastrophic situation today must be understood within the context of Israel's pre-October 7 policies, including vis-a-vis Palestinians' freedom of movement between Gaza, Israel, and the West Bank".

== Corporations ==
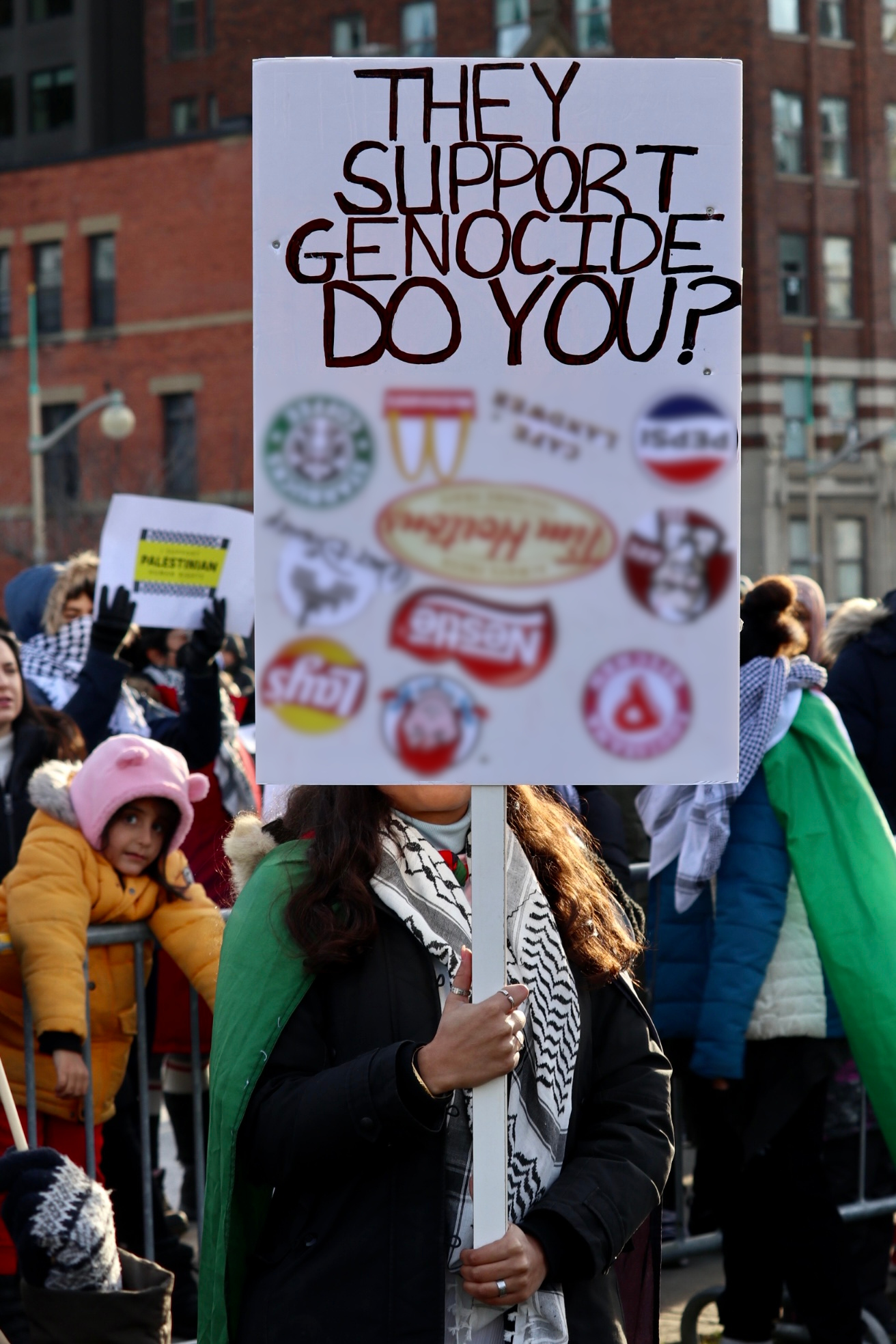
Pro-Palestinian protest in Ottawa, Canada, 23 November 2023

- Adani Ports stated that it was still operating its port in Haifa but would "monitor the situation".
- Amazon CEO Andy Jassy contacted families of employees in Israel and will provide relief. They also planned operations to keep AWS services online in the country.
- American Express sent $1.5 million in donations to help the relief efforts in Israel while also keeping close contact with staff in the region.
- Bank of America closed its Tel Aviv office.
- Bristol-Myers Squibb stated that it would continue to maintain medical supplies for patients in the region.
- Citigroup has allowed for workers in Israel to work at home until the situation was secured.
- Carnival Cruises stated that it would not stop at Israeli ports and would adjust accordingly.
- Decathlon stated that deliveries in Israel may be suspended or delayed.
- Eli Lilly and Company stated it would monitor the situation and would continue to provide medical care for its patients in Israel.
- FedEx initially suspended services to Israel but later relaunched service on 12 October.
- Goldman Sachs asked its employees in Tel Aviv to work from home until the security situation cleared.
- Google CEO Sundar Pichai stated that it had made contact with its over 2,000 employees in the area and was working to support them as well as humanitarian and relief organizations on the ground.
- H&M temporarily closed all of its stores in Israel.
- InterContinental Hotels Group stated that they would add security to their hotels in Israel that remained open, while closing the Six Senses Shaharut and the Hotel Indigo Tel Aviv.
- JPMorgan Chase asked its employees in Israel to work for home until the security situation cleared. CEO Jamie Dimon provided his support for Israel.
- McDonald's franchisees in the Middle East said it would donate $1 million to be split evenly between the Red Cross and the World Food Program to help victims of the conflict. McDonald's operators in Kuwait and Pakistan made donations towards humanitarian relief in Gaza, while McDonald's Israel offered discounts to soldiers and other members of the security forces and gave out 100,000 free meals. However, McDonald's Corporation later stated that all decisions were made independently from the company. It also rejected all claims of "disinformation" over its stance in the conflict and said the decisions were done by the franchisees independently without any consent or approval from McDonald's themselves.
- Morgan Stanley asked its employees in Israel to work from home until the security situation cleared.
- Norwegian Cruise Lines announced it would redirect ships away from Israeli ports of call in October.
- Nvidia cancelled an AI summit in Tel Aviv that would have featured CEO Jensen Huang.
- Oracle Corporation condemned the attacks against Israel by Hamas. It also pledged to support the Israeli Government and defense establishments.
- Paramount condemned the attacks and donated to humanitarian aid. The company also cancelled the MTV Europe Music Awards which was scheduled to be held in Paris on 5 November, saying that the conflict in Israel and Gaza "does not feel like a moment for a global celebration" as well as France's high-security airport alerts.
- Puma suspended store operations in Tel Aviv but continued deliveries in some cities.
- Royal Caribbean announced it would make adjustments to replace Israeli ports of call.
- Sesame Workshop released a statement stating "Our hearts are with Israeli and Palestinian children and families affected by the crisis in the region. All children deserve a safe childhood free from violence and terror."
- Starbucks sued the Workers United union, alleging that a pro-Palestinian social media post from the Starbucks Workers United account angered customers and damaged its reputation. The company demanded that the union cease using its name and logo, while the union filed a countersuit saying that they were defamed by Starbucks for implying that it supported terrorism and violence.
- Tesla announced that all 17 superchargers in Israel would be free until further notice.
- Teva Pharmaceuticals, the largest maker of generic drugs who is also based in Tel Aviv stated that production would not be affected and that backup production would continue to run.
- UBS told its Israeli staff to work from home and banned employees from travelling to the Middle East.
- UPS suspended service to Israel.
- The Walt Disney Company stated that it would provide humanitarian support to Israelis.
- Web Summit CEO Paddy Cosgrave expressed shock at the rhetoric of Western governments in response to the Israeli bombardment and said that "war crimes are war crimes even when committed by allies, and should be called out for what they are". In response, several tech companies such as Google, Meta, Amazon and Intel announced that they would pull out of the upcoming Web Summit to be held in Lisbon in November 2023. Cosgrave later apologized and resigned on 21 October.
- WWE renamed a 2025 episode of its WWE NXT television show, initially titled "NXT Invasion", to "NXT Showdown" as the event fell on the second anniversary of the October 7 attacks.
- Zara temporarily closed all of its stores in Israel.

=== Flight cancellations ===
- Aegean Airlines suspended flights to Tel Aviv on 9 October.
- Air Canada suspended all flights to Tel Aviv from Toronto and Montreal through 31 October.
- Air France suspended its flights to Tel Aviv indefinitely.
- Air India suspended its flights to Tel Aviv from 13 to 18 October.
- American Airlines suspended flights to Tel Aviv.
- British Airways suspended all flights to Tel Aviv on 11 October even though it had been operating during the outbreak of fighting.
- Brussels Airlines cancelled all flights to Tel Aviv.
- Cathay Pacific cancelled its flights to Tel Aviv from Hong Kong on 10 October.
- Delta Air Lines cancelled all flights to Tel Aviv through 31 October, issuing refunds for affected passengers.
- EasyJet suspended its flights to Tel Aviv on 9 and 10 October.
- Emirates suspended flights to Tel Aviv on 9 October.
- Etihad cancelled its flights to Tel Aviv from Abu Dhabi on 10 October.
- Hainan Airlines cancelled its flights to Tel Aviv from Shanghai on 9 October.
- Iberia cancelled the majority of its flights to Tel Aviv on 8 October, maintaining a single flight between Madrid and Tel Aviv starting 10 October.
- ITA Airways cancelled all flights to Tel Aviv on 8 October.
- KLM cancelled a planned evacuation of Dutch citizens after it could not receive insurance.
- Korean Air cancelled its flights to Tel Aviv from Seoul on 9 October.
- LOT Polish Airlines cancelled all flights to Tel Aviv on 8 October.
- Lufthansa cancelled all flights to and from Tel Aviv on 9 October.
- Norwegian Air cancelled a planned evacuation flight from Tel Aviv to Oslo after it could not receive insurance.
- Ryanair suspended flights to Tel Aviv on 9 October.
- Swiss International Air Lines stated it would not operate any flights to and from Israel through 14 October.
- TAP cancelled its flights to and from Tel Aviv on 9 and 10 October.
- Transavia cancelled all flights to Tel Aviv from Paris and Lyon.
- United Airlines suspended all flights to Tel Aviv after running two flights on 7 and 8 October.
- Wizz Air cancelled its flights to Tel Aviv until further notice.

== Celebrities, political figures and other personalities ==
=== Celebrities, other personalities ===
- Gal Gadot, who is Israeli, condemned the attack on her home country.
- Gigi Hadid, who is of Palestinian descent, wrote on Instagram: "While I have hopes and dreams for Palestinians, none of them include the harm of a Jewish person. The terrorizing of innocent people is not in alignment with & does not do any good for the 'Free Palestine' movement. The idea that it does has fueled a painful, decades-long cycle of back&forth retaliation."
- Bella Hadid, who is of Palestinian descent, posted a written statement on Instagram mourning the loss of Israeli and Palestinian lives. She condemned "terrorist attacks on any civilians, anywhere". She also expressed concern over the humanitarian situation in Gaza. Hadid posted on Instagram: "I've been sent hundreds of death threats daily, my phone number has been leaked, and my family has felt to be in danger." In November 2023, Israeli music duo Ness & Stilla released the single "Harbu Darbu", which called for Bella Hadid's death alongside that of Dua Lipa and Mia Khalifa.
- Justin Bieber shared a post on Instagram asking people to "pray for Israel" which actually depicted the aftermath of the Israeli bombing of the Gaza Strip.
- Kris Jenner and her daughter Kylie Jenner announced that they support Israel and were saddened by the loss and damage done by Hamas in Israel.
- Quentin Tarantino expressed support for Israel. In mid-October 2023, he visited an IDF base in southern Israel to "boost the morale" of Israeli troops.
- Madonna expressed deep support for Israel and condemned the violent actions against Israeli citizens. She expressed hope that the conflict will be resolved through peaceful means and not violence. Madonna reiterated that the attack was the action of Hamas and not all Palestinians.
- U2 changed the lyrics to "Pride (In the Name of Love)" to honor those killed in the Re'im music festival massacre.
- Greta Thunberg expressed support for Gaza and Palestine, and called for a "ceasefire, justice and freedom for Palestinians and all civilians affected".
- Salman Rushdie expressed his "horror" at both Hamas' attack and Israel's retaliation and called for a "cessation in hostilities".
- Fazıl Say said his upcoming performances with the City of Birmingham Symphony Orchestra in Switzerland were cancelled after he called for Benjamin Netanyahu to "stand trial for war crimes, genocide and massacres".
- Vince Offer, who is Israeli, expressed outrage at US president Joe Biden's slow responses in preventing Hamas' attack on Israel and the Russian invasion of Ukraine.
- Rupi Kaur declined an invitation to attend a Diwali celebration hosted by US Vice President Kamala Harris in the White House, citing the Biden administration's continued support of Israel and its bombardment of Gaza, which she called "the collective punishment of a trapped civilian population".
- Douglas Murray expressed support for Israel's actions in the Gaza Strip. On 28 January 2024, Murray interviewed Israeli Prime Minister Benjamin Netanyahu.
- Moataz Matar had his UK visa cancelled by the Home Office and was placed on a watchlist barring him from reentry after he was accused of supporting Hamas following his participation in a pro-Palestine protest in London.
- Ana Tijoux participated at a benefit concert in Santiago, Chile to raise funds for hospitals in the Palestinian territories and express solidarity with civilians in Gaza.
- Elissa expressed her solidarity with Palestinians by posting a tweet featuring Palestine's flag with a quote "if you cannot lift the injustice, at least tell everyone about it".
- Jamie Lee Curtis expressed support for Israel.
- Summer Walker condemned the "genocide and execution of innocent lives" in Gaza.
- Former Pink Floyd bassist and co-founder Roger Waters, a longtime and controversial critic of Israel, described Hamas' attack on Israel as being "blown out of all proportion by the Israelis," prompting the president of the Central Israelite Committee of Uruguay, Roby Schindler, to accuse him of antisemitism and urging the local Sofitel branch not to host him in his scheduled concert in the country in November.
- Kehlani posted her solidarity with Palestine on Instagram and expressed disapproval towards other celebrities had remained silent on the matter.
- Melissa Barrera described the war as "genocide and ethnic cleansing" on Instagram and compared the situation in Gaza to "a concentration camp", prompting Spyglass Media Group, the producers of the upcoming film Scream VII to announce her removal from the cast, citing "zero tolerance for antisemitism or the incitement of hate in any form, including false references to genocide, ethnic cleansing, Holocaust distortion or anything that flagrantly crosses the line into hate speech."
- Susan Sarandon joined a pro-Palestine protest in New York City on 17 November in which she was accused of antisemitism after chanting "From the river to the sea, Palestine will be free". She also criticized conflations of antisemitism with criticism of Israel and expressed her opposition to antisemitism as well as Islamophobia. The United Talent Agency later said it no longer represented her.
- Rage Against the Machine frontman, Zack de la Rocha, attended a pro-Palestinian protest in Washington, D.C.
- Genesis Owusu called for a ceasefire and a "Free Palestine" in his acceptance speech at the 2023 ARIA Music Awards.
- Hend Sabri resigned as Goodwill Ambassador for the World Food Programme in protest over what she called the use of "famine and siege as weapons of war" in Gaza.
- Olly Alexander, who represented the United Kingdom at the Eurovision Song Contest 2024, signed a letter by LGBT association Voices4London, which accused Israel of committing apartheid against Palestinians and "Zionist propaganda" of pinkwashing the Israeli occupation of Palestinian territories.
- David Clennon expressed his support for Palestine. He said via email: "Hollywood used to be unanimous in showing its admiration and loyalty to Israel. A new show business generation is beginning to challenge that dominant ideology. And of course the old guard will do everything in their power to intimidate them."
- Marcia Cross wrote an Instagram post with broken heart and Palestinian flag emojis, stating, "I'm struggling to comprehend how to live among people with eyes that don't water, hearts that don't flinch, and voices that remain silent. There are no words for the horror that has and is being unleashed. And the silence has me believing I am deaf."
- Selma Blair called pro-Palestinian activists "terrorist supporting goons" and advocated for their deportation, stating, "May they meet their fate."
- Joe Rogan described Israel's actions in the Gaza Strip as a "genocide" in a discussion with comedian Kurt Metzger. In a podcast with Coleman Hughes eight days later during which Hughes disputed the genocide allegations, Rogan said: "I see what you're saying. You clearly know more about it than I do."
- Chris Martin of British rock band Coldplay stated during a concert in November 2023 that "We don't believe in oppression, or occupation, terrorism or genocide", asking the public to send love to those going through difficulties. In June 2024, Coldplay invited Palestinian-Chilean singer Elyanna to perform the songs "We Pray" and "Arabesque" with them at the Glastonbury Festival.
- Floyd Mayweather Jr. expressed support and sent military equipment to Israel.
- British rapper Lowkey used his Instagram profile to raise awareness regarding the death of 91 children that were killed during Israel's attacks on Gaza.
- Iranian opposition activist and analyst at Kayhan London Bahram Farrokhi believed that Israel's conduct in the war "does nothing to free the hostages or end terror, but razes entire neighborhoods to the ground and breeds new generation of radicalized youth". He also stressed the importance of defending Israel's "inalienable right to existence, in security and peace" and establishing peace based on "dialogue between peoples".

=== Political figures ===
- Argentina: During the second presidential debate for the 2023 presidential election which took place the day after the start of the conflict on 8 October, candidates Javier Milei, Patricia Bullrich, Sergio Massa and Juan Schiaretti all voiced support for Israel; the only exception was left-wing candidate Myriam Bregman (who is Jewish), who made an anti-Zionist speech. Massa promised in the debate that, if elected president, he would put Hamas on the list of terrorist organizations in Argentina. Both Bullrich and Buenos Aires mayor Horacio Rodríguez Larreta later participated in a pro-Israel rally in the capital a day later.
- Bolivia: Former president Evo Morales supported the Palestinian militant groups and criticized the Bolivian government's response. Former ambassador to the UN Sacha Llorenti demonstrated in support of Palestine on the streets of La Paz and called on Israel to be declared "a terrorist state".
- Canada: Leader of the Opposition Pierre Poilievre condemned the invasion of Israel as "terrorism and sadistic violence", and stated that Israel had the right to defend itself against these attacks. Former Prime Minister Stephen Harper expressed his solidarity with Israel.
- France: Leader of the left-wing La France Insoumise and former presidential candidate Jean-Luc Mélenchon criticized the Conseil Représentatif des Institutions juives de France for enforcing the agenda of Israel's government, which he described as far right, after the latter held rallies supporting Israel. Prior to that, his party referred to Hamas' attack as "an armed offensive of Palestinian forces". A scheduled "grand civic march" called by the French parliament on 12 November against rising antisemitism in France following the war was marred by controversy after Marine Le Pen, the leader of the far-right National Rally attended along with party president Jordan Bardella, given her father and predecessor as party leader, Jean-Marie Le Pen's history of antisemitic and Holocaust denialist statements. Melenchon, who did not attend the march, called it a meeting of "friends of unconditional support for the massacre" in Gaza.
- Iraq: Iraq's top Shia Muslim leader, Ali al-Sistani, condemned Israel and called on everyone in the world to stand up to the "terrible brutality" in besieged Gaza.
- Philippines: Former president Rodrigo Duterte said in an interview that if he was Netanyahu, he would "pulverise" Gaza and render it "the biggest cemetery in the world".
- United Kingdom: Keir Starmer, then Leader of the Opposition, condemned the attacks and said that "Israel has a right to defend herself". He later announced his support for Israel's "right" to totally cut power and water supplies to Gaza in an interview with LBC, prompting the Labour Muslim Network to describe his comments as endorsing "collective punishment" and demand an apology from him. Starmer's predecessor Jeremy Corbyn described Hamas' attack as "alarming", urging an immediate ceasefire and calling for Israel to end the occupation of Palestine as "the only means of achieving a just and lasting peace". Ben Wallace, former Secretary of State for Defence, stated that Israel's war "tactics will fuel the conflict for another 50 years [and] are radicalising Muslim youth across the globe." Former Chief of the Defense Staff David Richards called on Foreign Secretary David Cameron to demand a ceasefire.

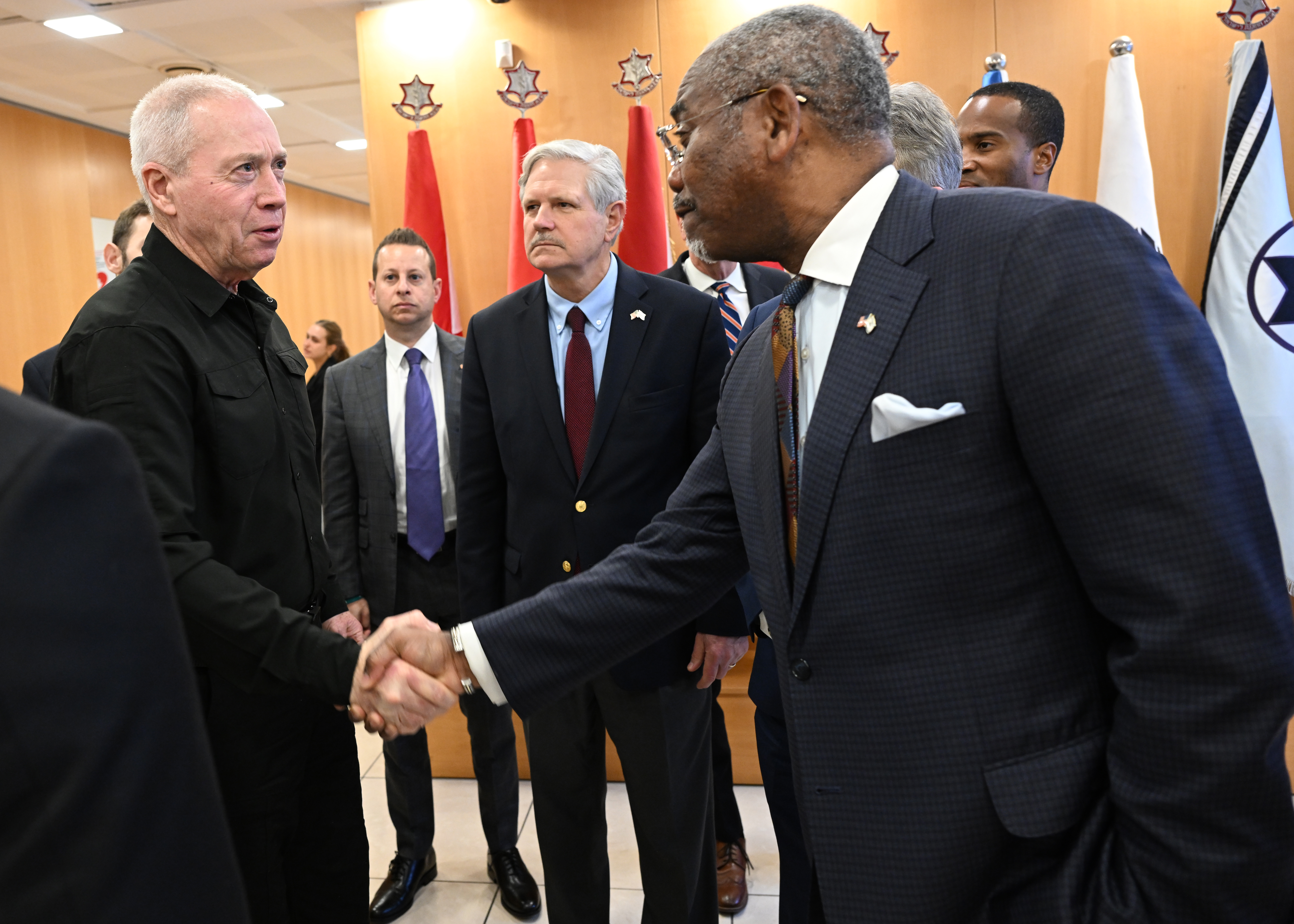
Bipartisan US Congressional Delegation to Israel, 12 November 2023

- United States: Former presidents Bill Clinton and Barack Obama condemned the attacks, while then-former president Donald Trump accused the Iranian government of supporting Hamas' attack and suggested that the Biden administration's agreement to unfreeze $6 billion in Iranian funds in exchange for the release of prisoners in September 2023 could have contributed to the attack. Obama warned Israel that its actions could "harden Palestinian attitudes for generations" and weaken international support for Israel; any military strategy that ignored the war's human costs "could ultimately backfire". Former President George W. Bush warned that Israel's ground offense in Gaza was "going to be ugly for a while".
  Hillary Clinton opposed a ceasefire in Gaza, stating "Remember, there was a ceasefire on October 6, that Hamas broke by their barbaric assault on peaceful civilians," then she added "Hamas have consistently broken ceasefires over a number of years." Senator and former presidential candidate Bernie Sanders said that "the tragedy of what Hamas did ... is that it will feed the extremism ... into the future" adding that it would "only harden the extreme right in Israel, maybe get some encouragement to terrorists in the Palestinian area, and inflame what already has been a terrible, terrible situation." In addition, Sanders rejected calls for a ceasefire, stating "I don't know how you can have a ceasefire with an organization like Hamas, which is dedicated to turmoil and chaos and destroying the State of Israel." Furthermore, he told CNN "I think what the Arab countries in the region understand is that Hamas has got to go."
  On 7 November, Democrat Rashida Tlaib, the first Palestinian-American member of the US Congress, was censured by the Republican-controlled US House of Representatives after she allegedly made antisemitic statements supporting the Palestinian cause. Tlaib denied the allegation, saying that deeming criticism of the Israeli government as antisemitic "sets a very dangerous precedent" which was being "used to silence diverse voices speaking up for human rights".
  On 14 December, Sanders introduced a privileged resolution invoking Section 502(b) of the Foreign Assistance Act, calling on the State Department to investigate Israeli crimes against humanity in its conduct of the war in Gaza. The resolution would freeze U.S. military aid to Israel unless the State Department issues a report within 30 days. The proposal was defeated, 72 to 11, with only Sanders, Democratic Senators Jeff Merkley, Chris Van Hollen, Martin Heinrich, Laphonza Butler, Ed Markey, Ben Ray Luján, Mazie Hirono, Peter Welch and Elizabeth Warren and Republican Rand Paul voting for it. Among the Senators who voted against the resolution were Chuck Schumer (D-NY), Mitch McConnell (R-KY), Dick Durbin (D-IL), Bill Cassidy (R-LA), Chris Murphy (D-CT), Rick Scott (R-FL), Tom Carper (D-DE), Mike Braun (R-IN), Bob Casey (D-PA), Mike Lee (R-UT), and Independent Angus King of Maine and Kyrsten Sinema of Arizona. Senator Brian Schatz (D-HI) voiced support for the resolution. Senator Chris Coons (D-DE) opposed the resolution. Senator Ben Cardin (D-MD), the chairman of the Foreign Relations Committee, said that resolution "would be a gift to Hamas, a gift to Iran."
  New York City Mayor Eric Adams opposed a ceasefire in Gaza, stating "Bring the hostages home."
- Uruguay: Former president Julio María Sanguinetti condemned Hamas's aggression and declared that it "must be repudiated", and that Israel has "the right to self-defense". On the other hand, former President José Mujica called the conflict a "disgrace" for both the Israeli and Palestinian people, and said that the scale of violence is a "failure of humanity and the policies of the United Nations."
- Kurdistan Communities Union co-chair Cemîl Bayik said the Israeli state and government "must abandon their policies of war, genocide and massacre", adding that the Palestinian people "have never been anti-Semitic" and "have been resisting occupation and genocide for decades".

=== Open letters ===
Chris Pine, Mark Hamill, Billy Porter, Ziggy Marley, Mekhi Phifer, Andy Garcia, Tracy-Ann Oberman, George Lopez, Ryan Murphy, Dana Goldberg, Jason Alexander, Eli Roth, Ryan Kavanaugh, Jeremy Piven, Aaron Bay-Schuck, Marty Singer, Antoine Fuqua, Mayim Bialik, Liev Schreiber, Amy Schumer, Michael Douglas, and Jerry Seinfeld were among the more than 700 celebrities including Hollywood professionals who signed an open letter on 12 October condemning Hamas and demanding the safe return of hostages held in Gaza. The letter read: "As Israel takes the necessary steps to defend its citizens in the coming days and weeks, social media will be overrun by an orchestrated misinformation campaign spearheaded by Iran. We urge everyone to remember the horrific images that came out of Israel and to not amplify or fall for their propaganda."

Several hundred Hollywood figures including Jordan Peele, David Oyelowo, Chris Rock, Taika Waititi, Ewan McGregor, James Corden, Matthew Weiner, Aaron Sorkin, Judd Apatow, Greg Berlanti, Bradley Cooper, Eugene Levy, Jon Hamm, Will Ferrell, Constance Wu, Jeff Goldblum, Bob Odenkirk, and Tiffany Haddish signed a letter on 23 October urging the release of the hostages and thanking US President Biden for his leadership in the Gaza war. The letter read: "Thank you for your unshakable moral conviction, leadership and support for the Jewish people, who have been terrorized by Hamas since the group's founding over 35 years ago, and for the Palestinians, who have also been terrorized, oppressed and victimized by Hamas for the last 17 years that the group has been governing Gaza."

Drake, Jennifer Lopez, Bella and Gigi Hadid, Michael Stipe, Cate Blanchett, Zayn Malik, Frank Ocean, Rachel McAdams, Oscar Isaac, Bradley Cooper, David Oyelowo, Ben Affleck, John Cusack, Kristen Stewart, Channing Tatum, Quinta Brunson, Sandra Oh, and Joaquin Phoenix, among many others, as part of a group called Artists4Ceasefire, signed a letter urging President Joe Biden and Congress to call for an immediate ceasefire in Gaza. The letter reads: "We believe all life is sacred, no matter faith or ethnicity and we condemn the killing of Palestinian and Israeli civilians." The letter was also signed by Tom Hardy, Milla Jovovich, Richard Gere, Peter Gabriel, Viggo Mortensen, Kirsten Dunst, Annie Lennox, Alyssa Milano, Jim Jarmusch, Brian Cox, Michael Moore, Andrew Garfield, Alfonso Cuarón, Selena Gomez, Janelle Monáe, Lupita Nyong'o, Jenna Ortega, Mark Ruffalo, Cynthia Nixon, and Mark Rylance.

In November 2023, more than 4000 musicians, including Zack de la Rocha, Tom Morello, Bikini Kill, Pulp, Lucy Dacus, Mogwai and Kali Uchis, signed an open letter calling for a ceasefire in the Gaza war. The letter was also signed by Serj Tankian, Denzel Curry, Brian Eno, Kid Cudi, Olof Dreijer, Bonnie "Prince" Billy, Keiyaa, Pink Siifu, Laurel Halo, Mykki Blanco, and L'Rain. In February 2024, thousands of artists and cultural workers, including Jesse Darling, Joanna Piotrowska, Nan Goldin, Michael Rakowitz and Leila Sansour, signed a petition calling for Israel to be excluded from the Venice Biennale. 400 celebrities, including British actress Helen Mirren, British singer Boy George, American musician Gene Simmons, American producer Scooter Braun, and American actresses Julianna Margulies and Emmy Rossum signed a letter supporting Israel's participation in the 2024 Eurovision Song Contest. More than 2,400 musicians and artists from Finland, Iceland and Sweden, including Karin Dreijer, First Aid Kit, Eric Saade and Malena Ernman, signed an open letter calling for Israel to be excluded from the 2024 Eurovision Song Contest.

== Religious organizations ==
=== Christian ===
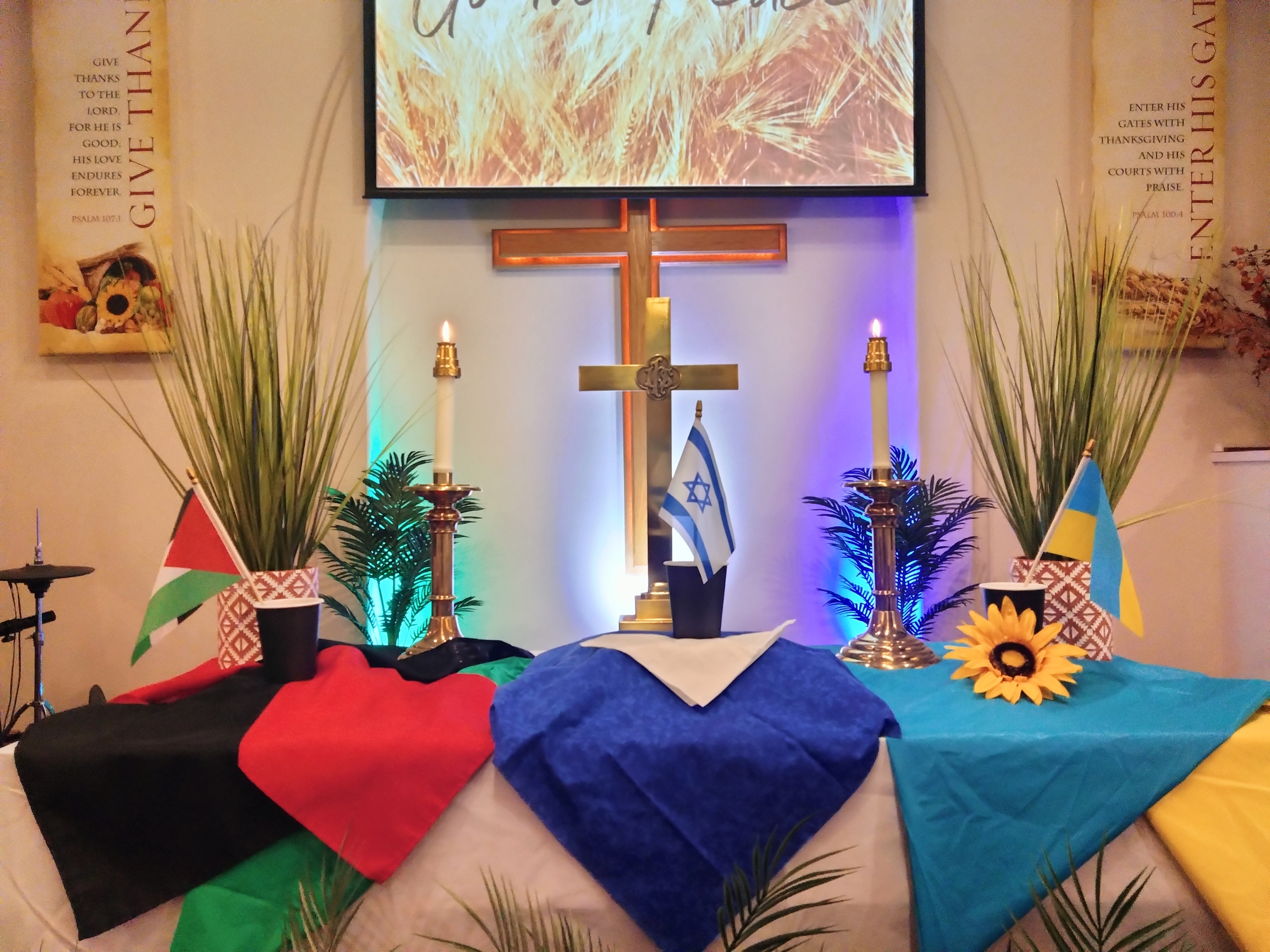
United Church of Christ altar

- The Holy See called for an immediate ceasefire and the release of Israeli hostages, and condemned Hamas' attacks while stating that criminal responsibility for terrorist acts "can never be attributed to an entire nation or people". It expressed support for a two-state solution with a special status for Jerusalem.
- The World Council of Churches, representing the majority of the world's Christian denominations, called for "an immediate cessation of this deadly violence, for Hamas to cease their attacks and ask[ed] both parties for de-escalation of the situation".
- The Eastern Orthodox Ecumenical Patriarch of Constantinople Bartholomew released a message stating "Our thoughts and prayers are particularly with the civilians... and especially with all the innocent children, who deserve to get raised in a truly "Promised Land" of peace and prosperity".
- The Catholic Latin Patriarchate of Jerusalem called on the international community and religious leaders "to make every effort in helping to de-escalate the situation, restore calm and work to guarantee the fundamental rights of people in the region" and supported the maintenance of the "Status Quo" with regard to all the Holy Places in the Holy Land, especially in Jerusalem, as well as the "urgent need to find a lasting and comprehensive solution to the Palestinian-Israeli conflict in this land."
- The Secretary General of the Anglican Communion Bishop Anthony Poggo expressed pain for the people of the region and prayer for the safety of civilians and the cessation of violence. He also offered prayers for Primate Hosam Naoum of the Episcopal Church in Jerusalem and the Middle East.
- The Nigerian Christian Pilgrim Commission announced it was suspending pilgrimages to Israel.
- The First Presidency of The Church of Jesus Christ of Latter-day Saints issued a statement about Middle East violence saying it affirmed that God "calls upon all of us to love our neighbors as ourselves, and we pray for a peaceful resolution of all conflicts". LDS President Russell M. Nelson also called for peace.
- The National Council of Churches in the Philippines called the conflict a "lopsided" war in favor of Israel. It urged Israel's response against Hamas' attack to be scrutinized for violation of international humanitarian law and called for a "just peace".
- On behalf of Quakerism, the Friends World Committee for Consultation (in collaboration with QUNO, FCNL, and Britain Yearly Meeting, among others) called for "a ceasefire in Israel-Palestine" and emphasized action towards peace. This position references the Quaker opposition to violence of any kind. The FWCC claimed that Quakers have "been present in the [Gaza] region for more than 150 years, doing educational, peace, humanitarian and human rights work", including the American Friends Service Committee and Ramallah Friends School.

=== Jewish ===
- Ephraim Mirvis, the chief rabbi of the United Kingdom and Commonwealth, stated "the death of any innocent person is a tragedy," supported Israel to "do whatever it can to guarantee the survival of the state of Israel and the Jewish people," and called Hamas an "existential threat". Mirvis also rejected the accusations of genocide levied against Israel.
- Riccardo Di Segni, the chief rabbi of Rome, stated that "Whoever does evil must be defeated, as happened with the Nazis in 1945," and criticized the Catholic and other churches' response for being "a jumble of political and religious declarations that have left us confused and offended ."
- In response to a letter by mufti Nazirudin Mohd Nasir of Singapore, chief rabbi Mordechai Abergel called for peaceful coexistence and solidarity.

=== Muslim ===
- The Al-Azhar Al-Sharif mosque in Cairo, regarded as Sunni Islam's foremost seat of religious learning, issued a statement saying that it stood "fast with full support to the free people of Palestine, who have come to revive our self-confidence, lifeline, and a long-lost sense of aliveness". It also criticised the international community's "double standards when it comes to the Palestinian cause".
- Muhammadiyah urged the UN Security Council "to immediately take political and diplomatic steps involving related parties, especially Israel-Palestine, to stop the war, carry out a ceasefire and carry out peace negotiations" and affirmed its position in supporting the Palestinian cause. It also asked the Indonesian government to be more proactive in resolving the Israeli-Palestinian conflict.
- Nahdlatul Ulama called for the conflict and violence "to be stopped immediately with all efforts" and urged the UN Security Council not to use "the veto right to defend one party in this prolonged humanitarian tragedy".

== Student organizations ==
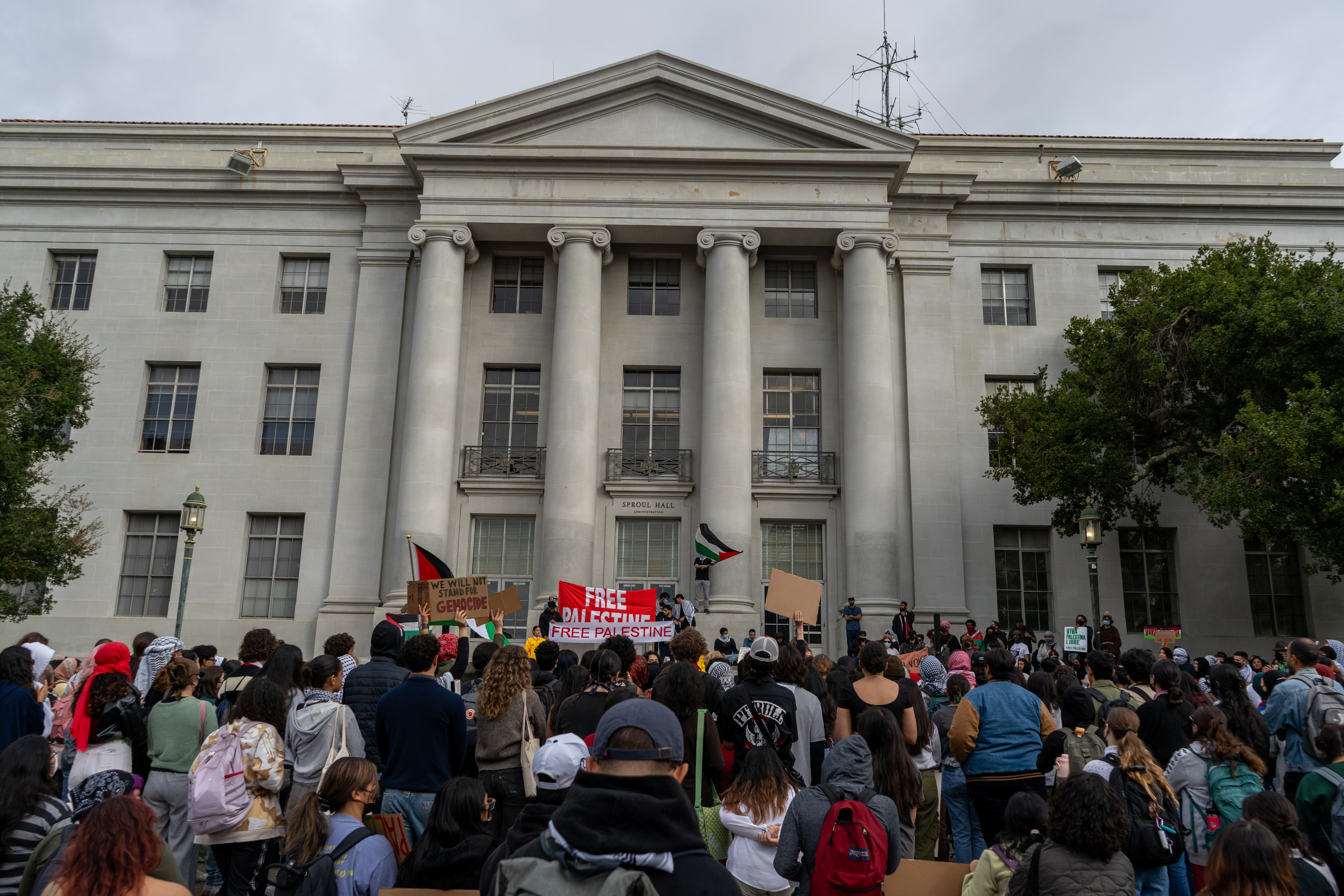
Pro-Palestinian protest outside Sproul Hall at the University of California, Berkeley, 25 October 2023

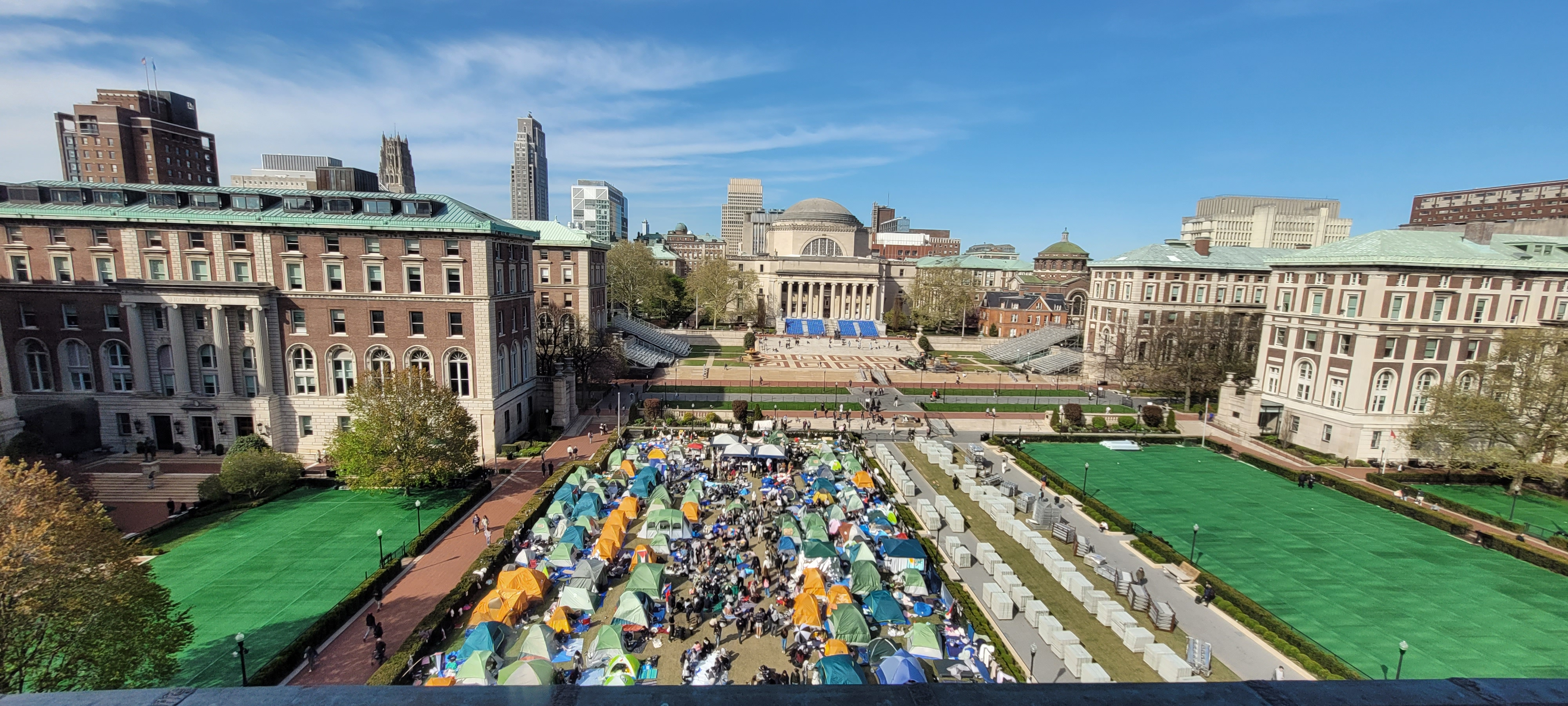
Pro-Palestinian protesters occupying the Columbia University campus in April 2024

- A coalition of 34 student organizations from Harvard University issued a statement stating the conflict "did not occur in a vacuum", and that Israel's "apartheid regime is the only one to blame. Israeli violence has structured every aspect of Palestinian existence for 75 years." The statement was signed by Palestinian and Muslim support groups as well as others including the African American Resistance Organization and the Harvard Jews for Liberation. However several of the organisations such as Amnesty International at Harvard, Harvard College Act on a Dream, the Harvard Undergraduate Nepali Student Association, the Harvard Islamic Society and the Harvard Undergraduate Ghungroo withdrew their support for the statement and condemned the massacres of civilians by Hamas.
- The Oxford Palestine Society said in an Instagram post that "the offensive launched from Gaza can only be understood in the context of Israel's ongoing, decades long, military occupation and colonisation of Palestinian land and imposition of a system of oppression that meets the legal definition of apartheid." They also urged students to support the "movement for a free Palestine" and join a scheduled protest on 12 October. In contrast, the Oxford Israel Society said it "unequivocally condemns" the recent conflict and "the massacre and hostage taking committed by Hamas and Islamic Jihad terrorists" and called on Oxford University and other colleges to condemn the Palestinian attacks.
- Islami Jamiat Talaba, Pakistan's largest student organization, organized a rally at Karachi University in support of Palestine that was attended by hundreds of students on 10 October, during which a 200-foot Palestinian flag was unfurled by the protesters.
- Students at Cornell University wrote spraypainted messages related to the conflict on the Ithaca, New York campus, including "Israel is Fascist" and "Free Palestine." The slogans were subsequently removed by the university.
- On 12 October, a protest at Columbia University in New York City saw the attendance of pro-Palestinian demonstrators. Since November 2023, Jewish Voice for Peace's chapter at Columbia University has been under suspension. The university stated that both the JVP chapter and Students for Justice in Palestine had breached university policies, engaging in "threatening rhetoric and intimidation", leading to the suspension of the clubs.
- Al-Azhar University issued a statement calling "on the free people of the world, international organizations and institutions to take immediate action to break the siege of Gaza hospitals." It also emphasized that silence against the crimes of the occupying-regime is considered a stain on the forehead of humanity and the world community.

== Sports organizations ==
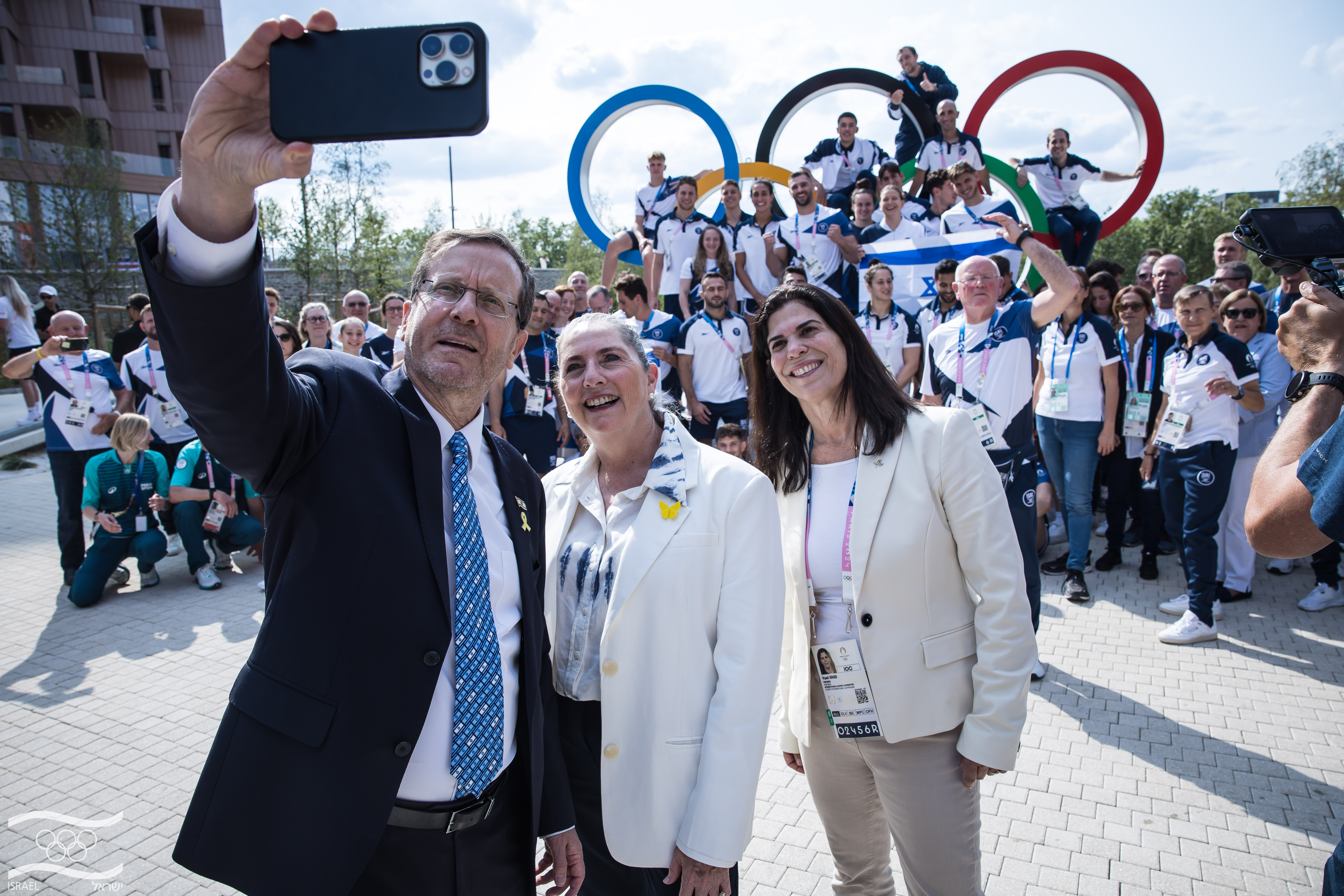
Israeli President Isaac Herzog with Israeli athletes in the Olympic village in Paris, 24 July 2024

Palestinian sports organizations and sports organizations from Arab countries have called for sanctions to be imposed against Israel and to prevent its participation in the 2024 Summer Olympics due to the Gaza war. The calls from the organizations have been prompted by concerns about the war's impact on Palestinian athletes and sports facilities. In November 2023, Russia accused the International Olympic Committee of having double standards by not sanctioning Israel due to its military actions in Gaza and occupation of Palestine, as Palestine is also an IOC member. In January 2024, over 300 Palestinian sports clubs called for Israel to be barred from the 2024 Olympics after Israeli airstrikes had killed Palestine's Olympic football team coach, and damaged the headquarters of the Palestine Olympic Committee in Gaza. In February 2024, several left-wing French lawmakers sent a letter to the IOC proposing to sanction Israeli athletes while only allowing them to participate under the Individual Neutral Athlete label. The IOC has cautioned athletes against boycotting or discriminating others, stating that immediate action will follow any discriminatory behavior such as the case of Algerian judoka Fethi Nourine, who received a ten-year ban following his refusal to fight Tohar Butbul, an Israeli in 2020. The IOC also stated that athletes are not to be held accountable for their government's actions. Due to the continuation of the Israeli-Palestinian war, France asked the United States for help in securing the Olympic Games. In March 2024, IOC President Thomas Bach made it clear there was no issue regarding Israel participating at the 2024 Summer Olympics and cautioned athletes against boycotts and discrimination.

On 8 October 2023, UEFA cancelled all of its scheduled football matches in Israel for the next two weeks, including a qualifier for the Euro 2024 tournament between Israel and Switzerland on 12 October. It also canceled the 2025 UEFA European Under-21 Championship qualification games between Israel and Estonia on 12 October and between Israel and Germany on 17 October, as well as the 2024 UEFA European Under-17 Championship mini tournament on 11–17 October involving Israel, Belgium, Gibraltar and Wales. UEFA held a moment of silence for all Euro 2024 qualifying matches on 17 October for both the victims of the war in Israel as well as the Swedish fans that were murdered in Brussels a day prior. Israel later played the rest of their Euro 2024 qualification matches in Hungary, while Maccabi Haifa played a Europa League match in Cyprus before heading to Serbia alongside Maccabi Tel Aviv. EuroLeague Basketball also suspended all home games for Israeli clubs, including Hapoel Tel Aviv B.C. and Maccabi Playtika Tel Aviv, with the teams sending its players to Cyprus and Greece to possibly resume the season there. All EuroLeague and EuroCup matches held a moment of silence for the victims of the attack.

The National Football League, National Basketball Association, Major League Baseball, National Hockey League, and Major League Soccer, amongst several other North American leagues, all released statements condemning the terrorist attacks on Israeli civilians by Hamas while urging for peace for civilians in the region. Many teams in their respective leagues also released their own statements with the same message. However, there was criticism towards all the leagues and teams for not releasing statements for the Palestinian civilians that had also been killed in the conflict. All NFL teams during Week 6 held a moment of silence for the Israeli and American victims as well as those affected by the conflict, starting with a Thursday Night game between the Denver Broncos and Kansas City Chiefs. However, during the London game between the Baltimore Ravens and Tennessee Titans, the moment of silence was interrupted by some spectators chanting "Free Palestine".

In the United Kingdom, there was pressure for the English FA and the Premier League to release statements and honour the victims of the attacks by Hamas, with some noting that other tragedies, disasters, and social movements had been honoured much more quickly. Eventually the English FA honoured both the Israeli and Palestinian victims at a friendly with Australia and a UEFA Euro 2024 qualifying match with Italy. However, they did not light up Wembley Stadium in the colours of the Israeli flag, believed to be due to one of Australia's 2026 FIFA World Cup qualifier opponents being Palestine. The Premier League also honoured the victims following the international break. The FA has also banned the use of the phrase "from the river to the sea" on any players' social media following its use by Hamza Choudhury.

Following a request from the Palestinian Football Association's head Jibril Rajoub, the Algerian Football Federation offered to host "all official and non-official matches" of the Palestinian national team as part of its preparations for its qualifiers for the 2026 World Cup and 2027 Asian Cup. It also pledged to shoulder all associated costs. The PFA later accepted Algeria's request, though after FIFA and the AFC prevented the team from playing in Algeria, they selected Kuwait, Qatar, and other countries in the Islamic world instead. Lebanon, Palestine and Israel's neighbour to the north, were also forced to play the same 2026 World Cup and 2027 Asian Cup qualification in neutral ground due to the fear of the war's spillover to the country. Celtic F.C. was fined 17,500 euros ($19,000) by UEFA after fans displayed a flag of the Popular Front for the Liberation of Palestine during a Champions League match against Atletico Madrid on 25 October. A number of people protested at the Paris Organizing Committee for the Olympic and Paralympic Games headquarters in the suburb of Saint-Denis, waving Palestinian flags and chanting slogans condemning Israel's "institutional involvement" in the Games as a result of the ongoing conflict in Gaza. The demonstrators urged Olympic authorities to restrict Israel's involvement in the Paris Games.

The left-wing Podemos party in Spain requested the exclusion of Israel from the Olympics and called on countries to boycott the competition if Israeli continued to participate. Ione Belarra, the Podemos party's secretary general and former minister of social rights in Spain, called for Israel to be removed from the Olympics. During the 74th FIFA Congress on 17 May 2024 in Bangkok, the Palestinian Football Association called for a vote on suspending the IFA from both UEFA and FIFA, stating that the damage to football infrastructure and deaths of Palestinian footballers during the Gaza war were enough grounds to justify the action, while other supporters referred to other suspensions such as those of Apartheid South Africa from 1961 to 1991 and Russia following the Russian invasion of Ukraine in 2022. The IFA responded stating that their football was halted and that many of their footballers have been killed since 7 October 2023 while calling for peace and a future friendly between the two countries. Gianni Infantino would respond to the PFA stating that FIFA would conduct its own legal review and that the information about a final decision would be forwarded to the FIFA Council meeting on 3 October 2024 while also calling for peace. It was later decided that while Israel would not be suspended, FIFA would investigate the claims by the PFA. Prior to qualification for the 2026 FIFA World Cup, the Norwegian Football Federation called for an investigation into Israel (who they were drawn against), stating that they wanted to end civilian casualties in the region.

=== Individual athletes ===
Bayern Munich and Morocco defender Noussair Mazraoui posted in support of Palestine on social media. Liverpool and Egypt captain Mohamed Salah appealed for humanitarian aid to be allowed into Gaza and for the "massacres" and the "slaughter of innocent civilians" to stop; Al-Ittihad's French forward Karim Benzema called the bombing of Gaza "unjust". In response, French interior minister Gerald Darmanin accused him of having links to the Muslim Brotherhood.

OGC Nice suspended its Algerian defender Youcef Atal after he shared a video on Instagram from a Palestinian preacher purportedly calling for violence against Jewish people. He was later detained by French authorities and received an eight-month suspended sentence from a French court on charges of inciting hatred. 1. FSV Mainz 05 also suspended and later dismissed its Dutch forward Anwar El Ghazi after he made what the club called an "unacceptable" social media post about the war.

Following the al-Ahli Arab Hospital explosion, Tottenham Hotspur's Israeli winger Manor Solomon purportedly blamed Palestinians for "killing their own people and blaming Israel" in an Instagram post. Granada's Israeli forward Shon Weissman posted social media messages in support of his country following Hamas' attack. After receiving threats in response, he was excluded from a La Liga match against Osasuna on 20 October due to security issues. Muslim American basketball player Enes Kanter said the Hamas attack was a "barbaric" act of terrorism that did not reflect Islamic teachings. On 12 November, he said anti-Israel protesters on college campuses were "brainwashed" and urged people not to get their information from TikTok.

Egyptian swimmer Abdelrahman Sameh and Tunisian Olympic swimmer Ahmed Hafnaoui were both criticized and subjected to death threats due to their support for Palestine on social media, with American swimmer Eli Cohen telling Hafnaoui he was asking people to "donate to terror" after the latter posted a link to a humanitarian fundraiser for war victims. Likewise, Israel Swimming Association Chairman Miki Halika wrote to the sport's international governing body World Aquatics urging it to "take action against swimmers who support terrorism". Mixed-martial arts champion Khabib Nurmagomedov posted on Instagram that Israel was engaged in "genocide" in Gaza.

NBA star LeBron James, XFL co-owner Dwayne Johnson, former NFL players Julian Edelman and Tom Brady, and former NBA player Amar'e Stoudemire all made posts supporting peace in Israel. Israeli–American Baltimore Orioles pitcher Dean Kremer wore a Star of David during a playoff game against the Texas Rangers, as did Houston Astros shortstop Alex Bregman. Israeli right-winger Sagiv Yehezkel was suspended from Antalyaspor and later detained by Turkish authorities after showing his bandaged wrist during a match against Trabzonspor with the message "100 days, 7/10" in support of hostages in Gaza on 14 January 2024, which Turkish Justice Minister Yılmaz Tunç claimed was an "ugly action supporting Israel's massacre in Gaza". Başakşehir ended its contract with Israeli player Eden Karzev after he re-posted a social media message with the hashtag "BringThemHomeNow", referring to the hostages held by Hamas.

== Other organizations ==
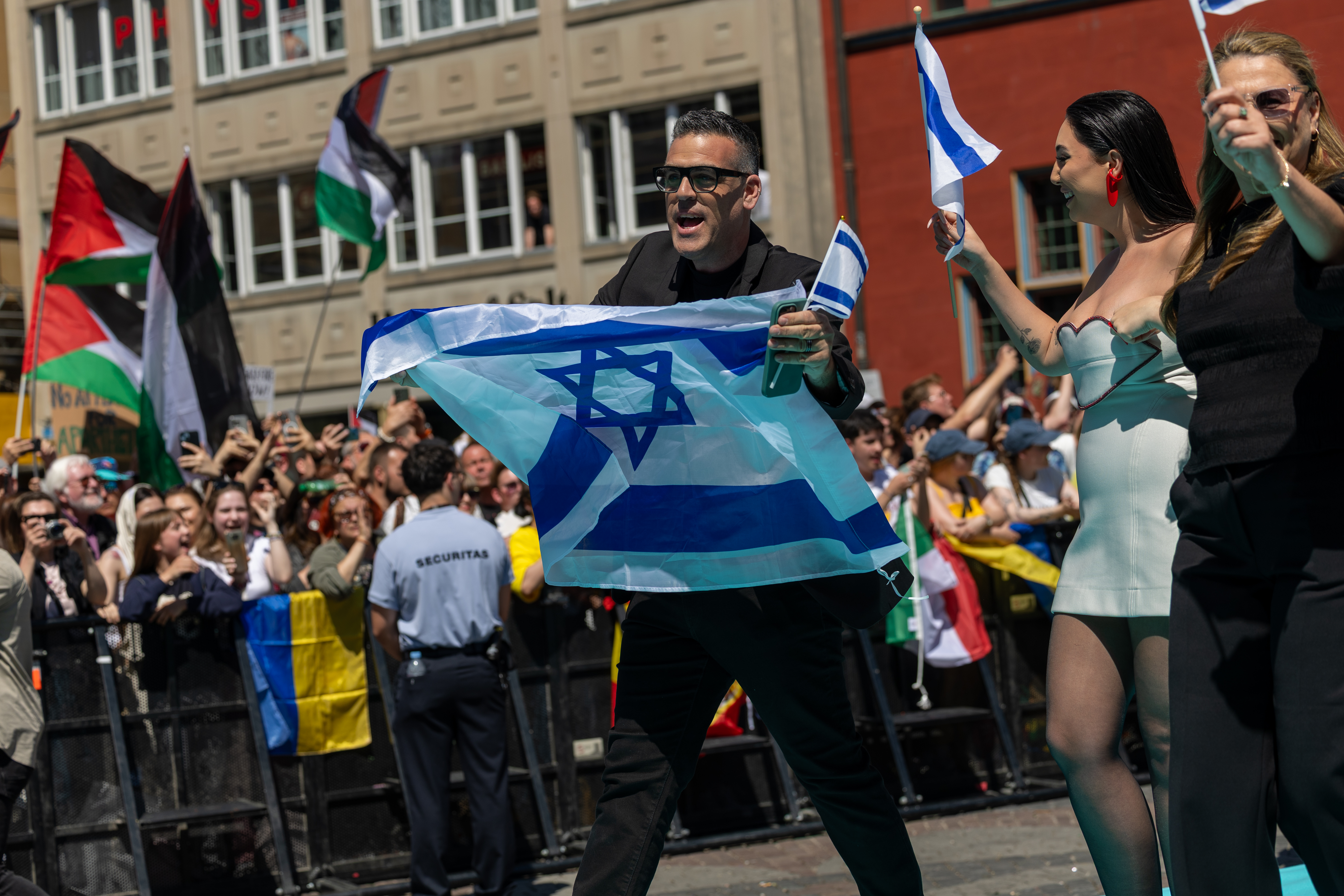
Pro-Palestinian protest during the opening ceremony of the Eurovision Song Contest in Basel, Switzerland, 11 May 2025

On 16 February 2024 a coalition of several U.S. unions announced a call for a ceasefire. The unions claim to represent some nine million teachers, nurses, auto workers, flight attendants and others.

=== Eurovision Song Contest 2024 ===
The ongoing humanitarian crisis resulting from the Israeli retaliatory operations in the Gaza Strip since October 2023 led to increasing calls that the European Broadcasting Union (EBU) exclude Israel from taking part in the Eurovision Song Contest 2024, with human rights activists urging other countries to boycott the event. Despite this, Israel ultimately appeared on the list of participants released by the EBU on 5 December 2023. The EBU said in a statement: "It is a competition for broadcasters (not governments) and the Israeli public broadcaster has participated in the Contest for 50 years. The Eurovision Song Contest remains a non-political event that unites audiences worldwide through music."

The Icelandic Association of Composers and Lyricists (FTT), which represents artists in Iceland, told its members in a statement to not participate in the Eurovision Song Contest 2024 unless Israel is removed from the competition, on the same grounds as Russia was in the last competition, due to Israel's conduct in the Gaza war. FTT also urged the Icelandic National Broadcaster (RÚV) to withdraw from the competition unless Israel is denied participation on the same grounds as Russia was due to its invasion of Ukraine.

=== Transatlantic Civil Servants' Statement on Gaza ===
The Transatlantic Civil Servants' Statement on Gaza is a public letter signed by over 800 currently serving officials in the United States and Europe which states that the policies of their governments during the Israel-Gaza war could amount to "grave violations of international law". The signatories are civil servants from the United States, the European Union, and 11 European countries including France, Germany, and the United Kingdom. The identities of the signers were not made public for fear of repercussions.

== Visits by world leaders ==
Numerous heads of state and government have visited Israel, Ramallah, and Egypt for consultations.

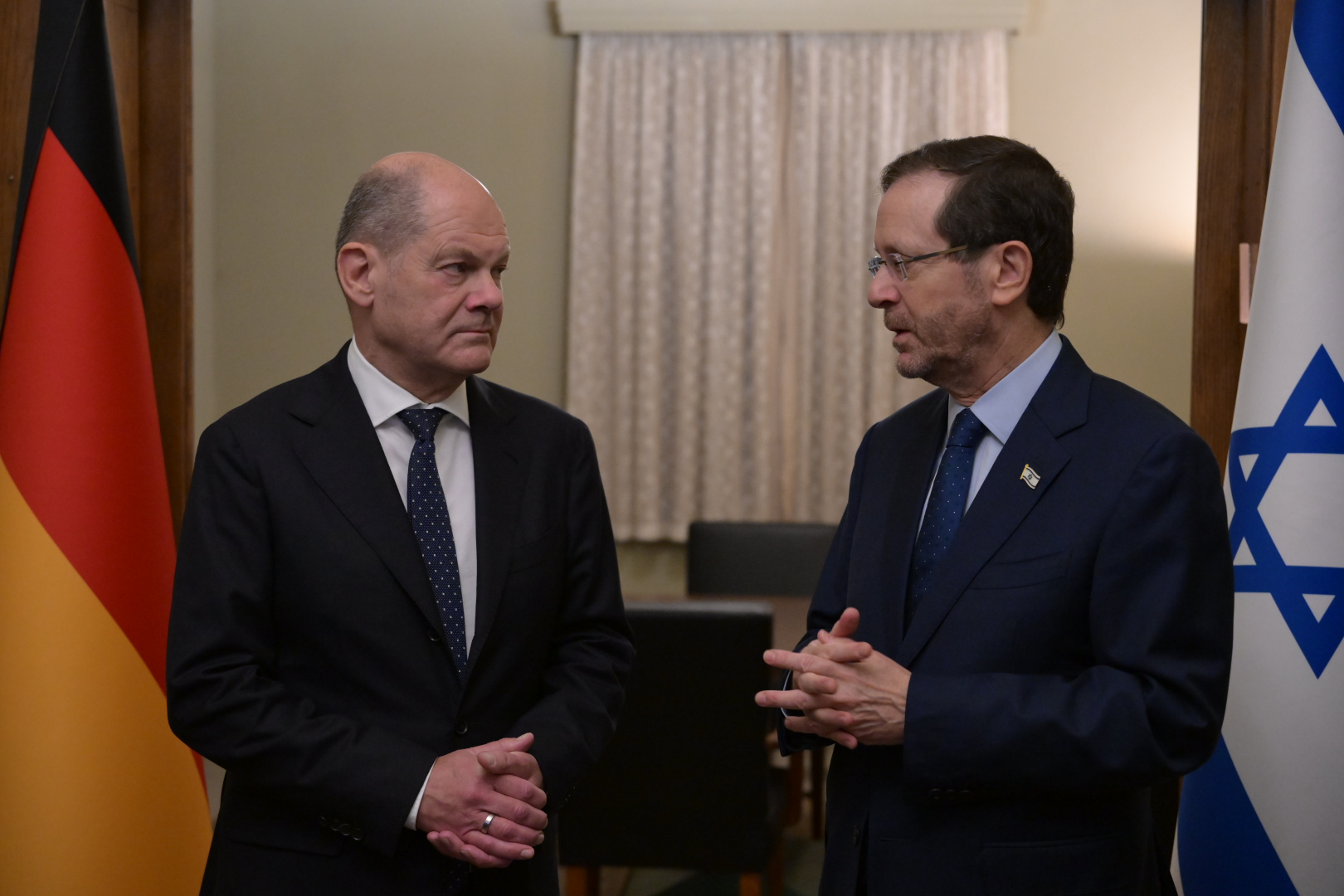
Olaf Scholz and Isaac Herzog, 17 October 2023

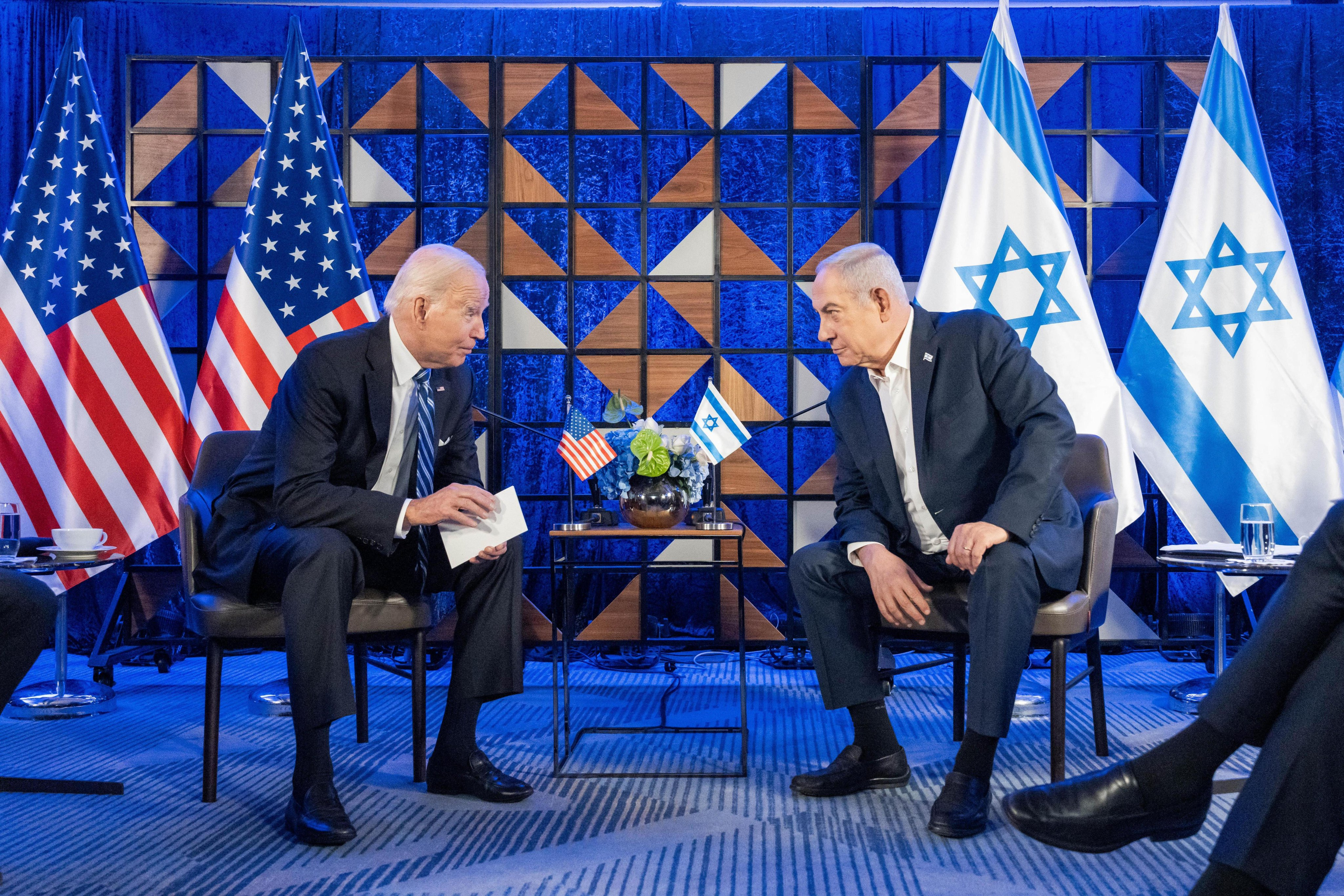
Joe Biden and Benjamin Netanyahu, 18 October 2023

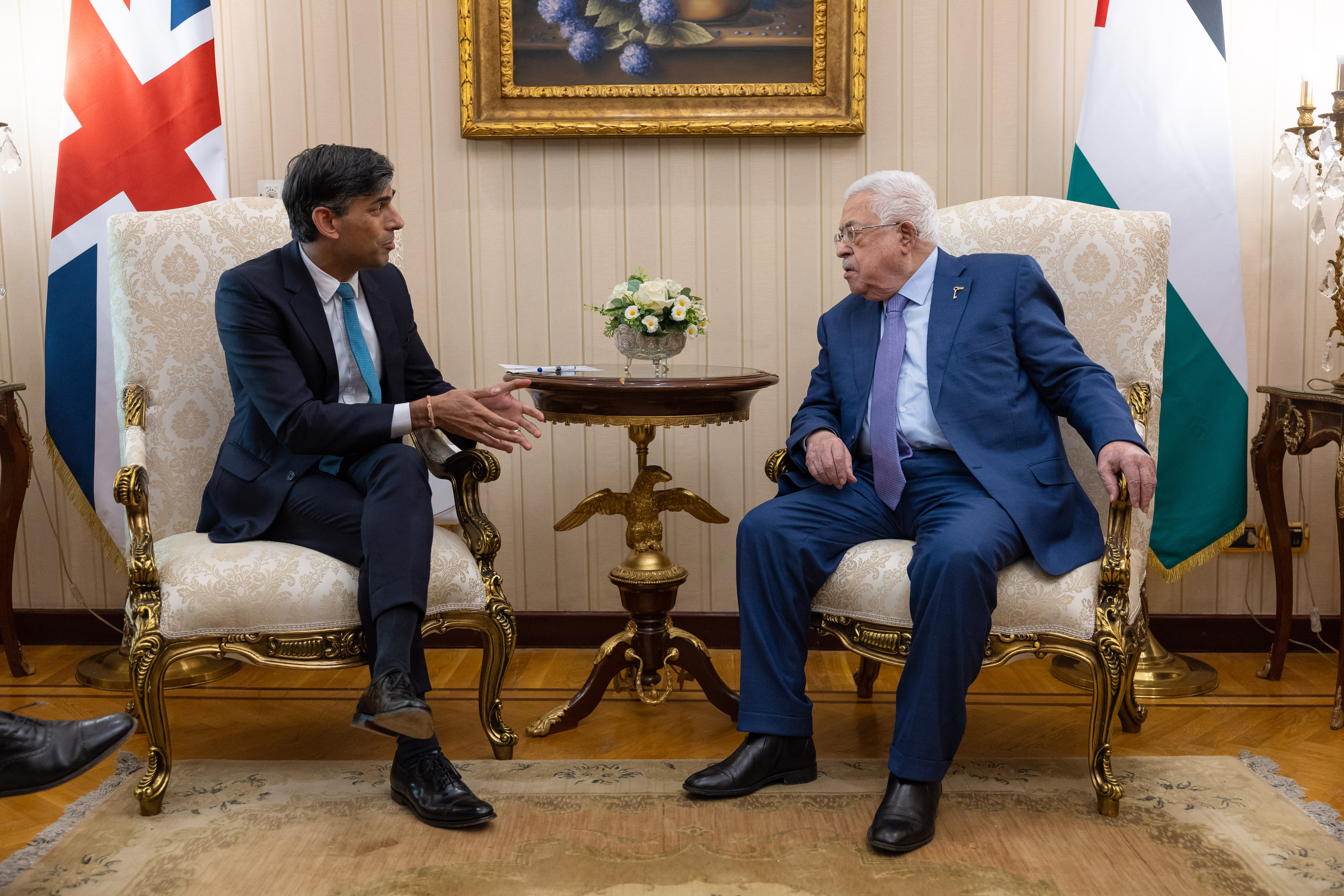
Rishi Sunak and Mahmoud Abbas, 20 October 2023

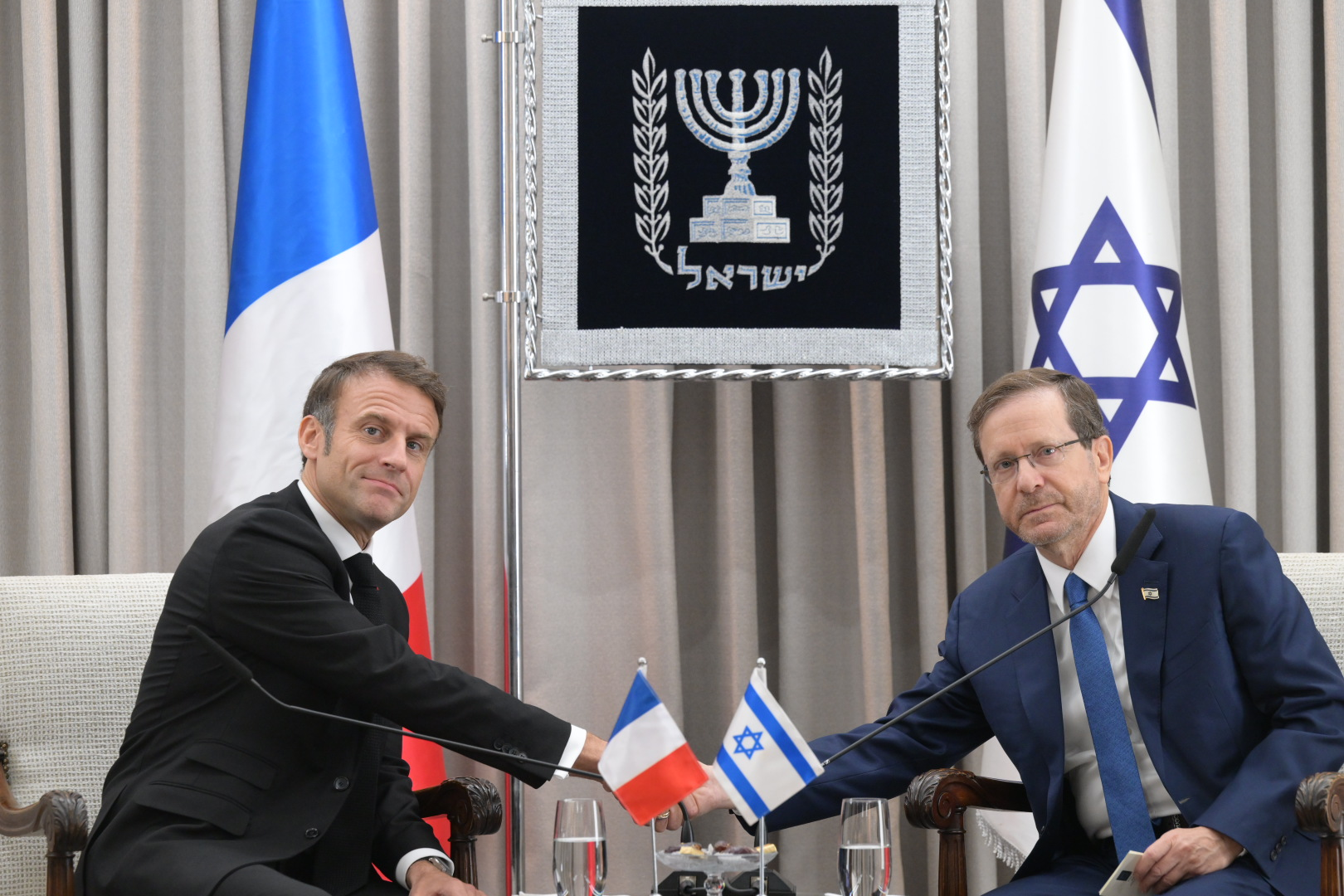
Emmanuel Macron and Isaac Herzog, 24 October 2023

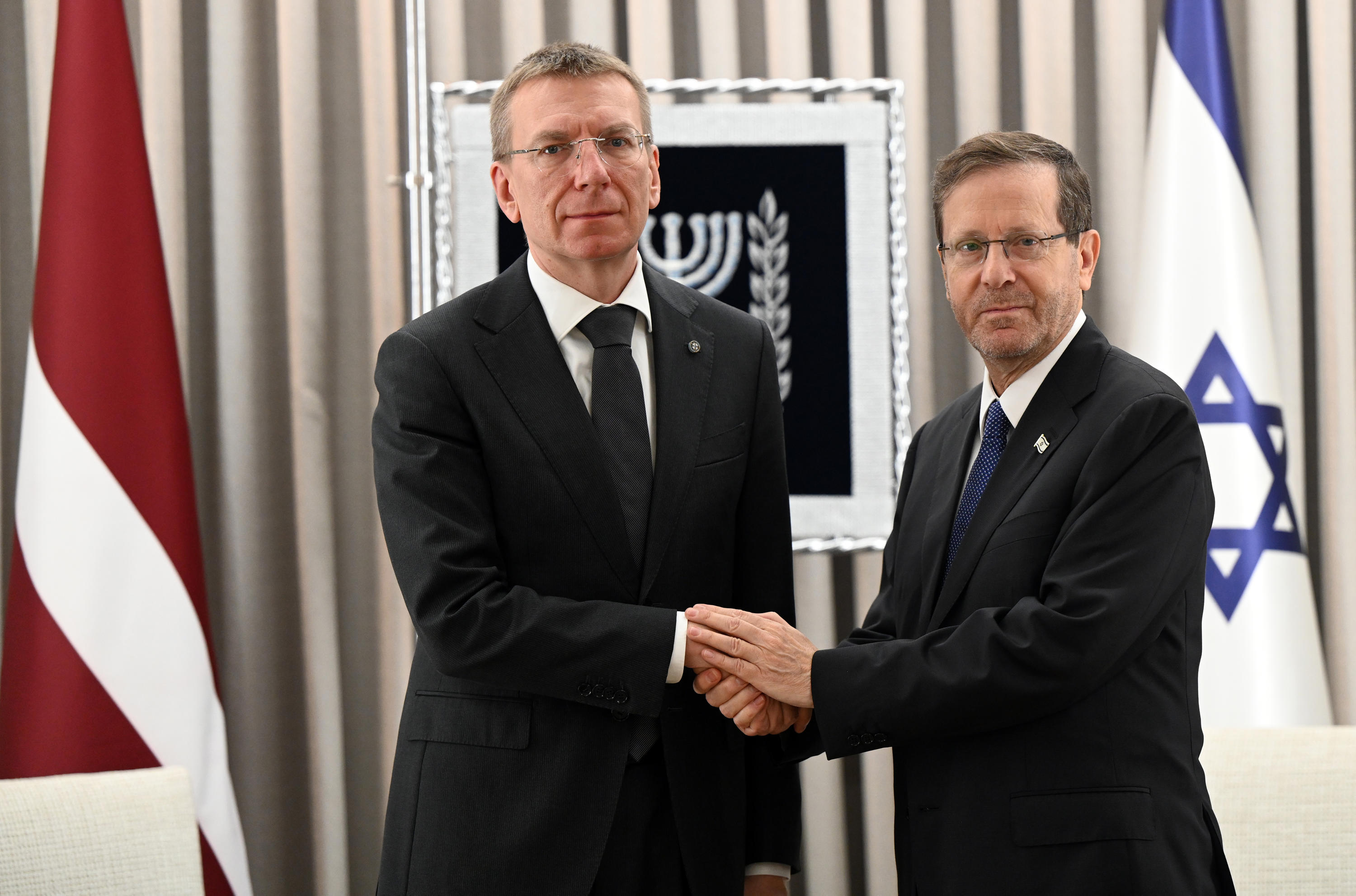
Edgars Rinkēvičs and Isaac Herzog, 20 November 2023

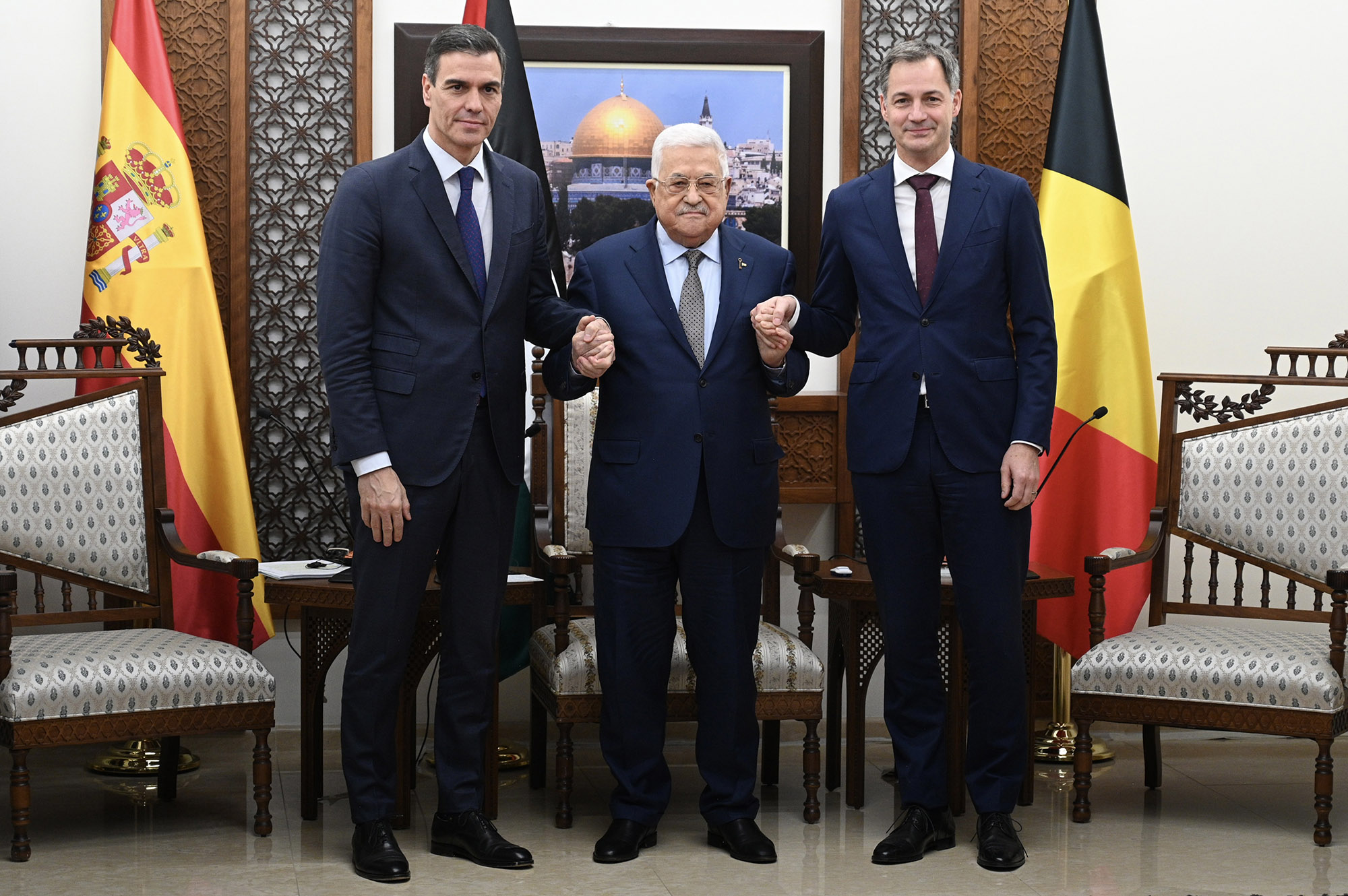
Pedro Sánchez, Mahmoud Abbas, and Alexander De Croo, 23 November 2023

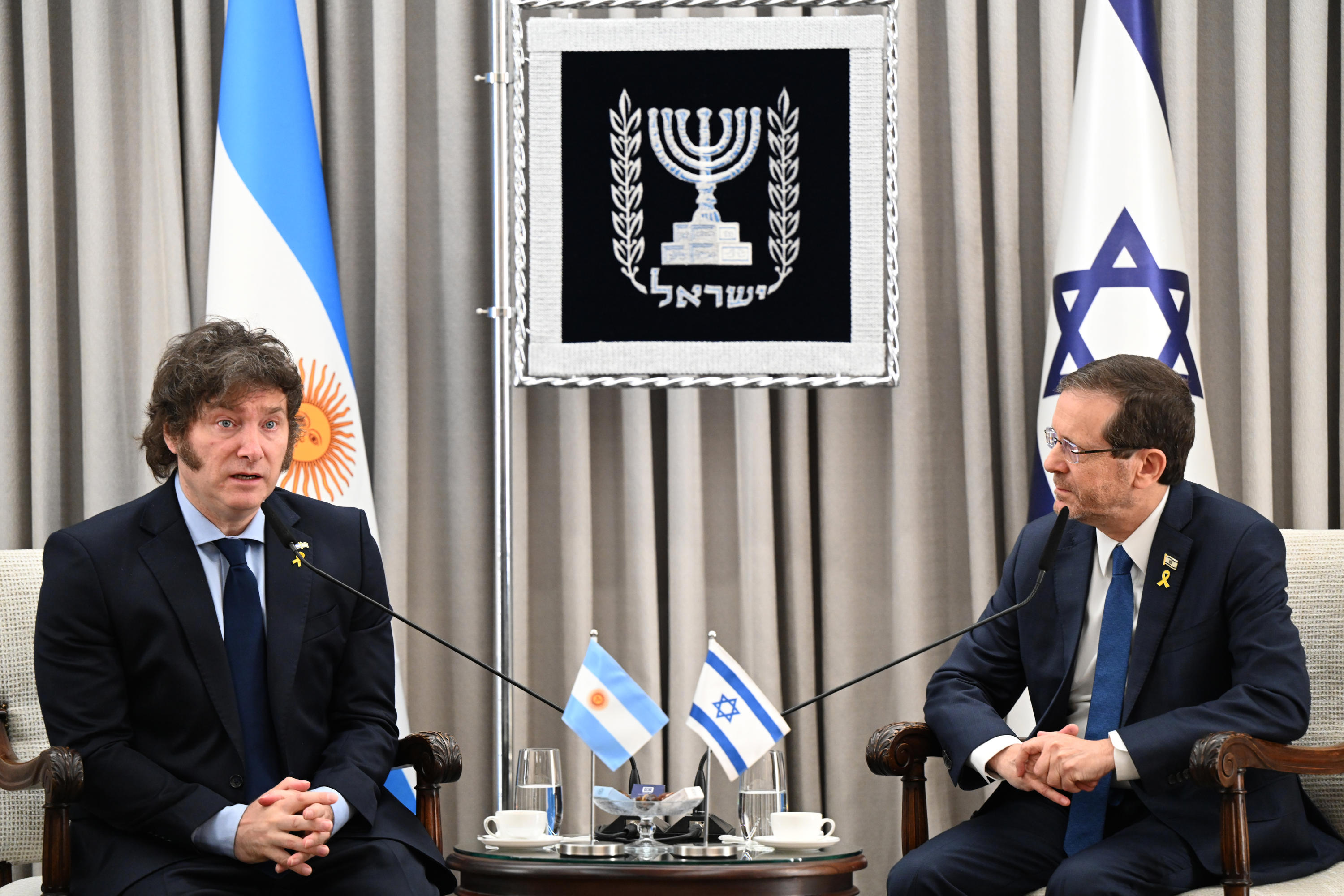
Javier Milei and Isaac Herzog, 6 February 2024

European Commission President Ursula von der Leyen and European Parliament President Roberta Metsola arrived in Israel on 13 October. On 17 October, German Chancellor Olaf Scholz visited Israel to express solidarity with the country. On his departure from Ben-Gurion airport, he was evacuated to a shelter after a rocket alarm went off. On 18 October, US President Joe Biden arrived in Israel and was received at Ben-Gurion airport by Israeli President Isaac Herzog and Prime Minister Benjamin Netanyahu. At a news conference, he said Israel did not commit the al-Ahli hospital bombing in Gaza and blamed what he called "the other team" for the attack. In the wake of the attack, a summit in Amman hosted by King Abdullah II that was also to be attended by Biden, Palestinian President Mahmoud Abbas and Egyptian President Abdel Fattah el Sisi was cancelled by the Jordanian government.

British Prime Minister Rishi Sunak arrived in Israel on 19 October, in order to meet Netanyahu and offer his condolences for the civilians killed in the initial attacks. On 21 October 2023, Italian Prime Minister Giorgia Meloni visited Israel to express solidarity with the country. French President Emmanuel Macron arrived in Israel on 24 October. Czech Prime Minister Petr Fiala arrived in Israel on 25 October. During the visit of Spanish Prime Minister Pedro Sánchez and Belgian Prime Minister Alexander De Croo, Netanyahu was asked to respect international law, and Sánchez announced that Spain was ready to recognize the State of Palestine. This triggered a harsh reaction from Israeli foreign minister Eli Cohen, who subsequently accused both prime ministers of "giving support to terrorism" in Israel. On 6 February 2024, Argentine president Javier Milei became the first Latin American president to visit Israel since the start of the war, where he condemned Hamas attacks and confirmed his position of moving the Argentine embassy to Jerusalem.

Serving heads of state and government that have visited Israel during the war
State	Office	Leader	Date	References
(Europe) European Commission	President	Ursula von der Leyen	13 October 2023	
Romania	Prime Minister	Marcel Ciolacu	17 October 2023	
Germany	Chancellor	Olaf Scholz	17 October 2023	
United States	President	Joe Biden	18 October 2023	
United Kingdom	Prime Minister	Rishi Sunak	19 October 2023	
Italy	Prime Minister	Giorgia Meloni	21 October 2023	
Cyprus	President	Nikos Christodoulides	21 October 2023	
Greece	Prime Minister	Kyriakos Mitsotakis	23 October 2023	
Netherlands	Prime Minister	Mark Rutte	23 October 2023	
France	President	Emmanuel Macron	24 October 2023	
Czech Republic	Prime Minister	Petr Fiala	25 October 2023	
Austria	Chancellor	Karl Nehammer	25 October 2023	
Hungary	President	Katalin Novák	5 November 2023	
Bulgaria	Prime Minister	Nikolai Denkov	6 November 2023	
Latvia	President	Edgars Rinkēvičs	20 November 2023	
Spain	Prime Minister	Pedro Sánchez	23 November 2023	
Belgium	Prime Minister	Alexander De Croo	23 November 2023	
Germany	President	Frank-Walter Steinmeier	26 November 2023	
Czech Republic	President	Petr Pavel	15 January 2024	
Argentina	President	Javier Milei	6 February 2024	
Guinea-Bissau	President	Umaro Sissoco Embaló	3 March 2024	
Paraguay	President	Santiago Peña	11 December 2024	
Greece	Prime Minister	Kyriakos Mitsotakis	30 March 2025	
Albania	Prime Minister	Edi Rama	7 April 2025	
Ecuador	President	Daniel Noboa	4–6 May 2025	
Argentina	President	Javier Milei	11 June 2025	
Fiji	Prime Minister	Sitiveni Rabuka	17 September 2025	

== Demonstrations ==
Demonstrations took place in many Middle Eastern countries, such as Yemen, Jordan, Lebanon, Kuwait, Turkey, Qatar, Bahrain, Syria, Egypt, Iraq and Iran in solidarity with the Palestinian groups. There were reports that many Iranians avoided these demonstrations and condemned the attacks online. Pro-Palestinian rallies were also held in Australia, Spain, South Africa, Pakistan, Libya, Tunisia, Morocco, Bangladesh, India, Sri Lanka, Serbia, Greece, Chile, Belgium, Italy, Philippines, South Korea, Ireland, Bosnia and Herzegovina, Bolivia, Sweden, and Denmark.

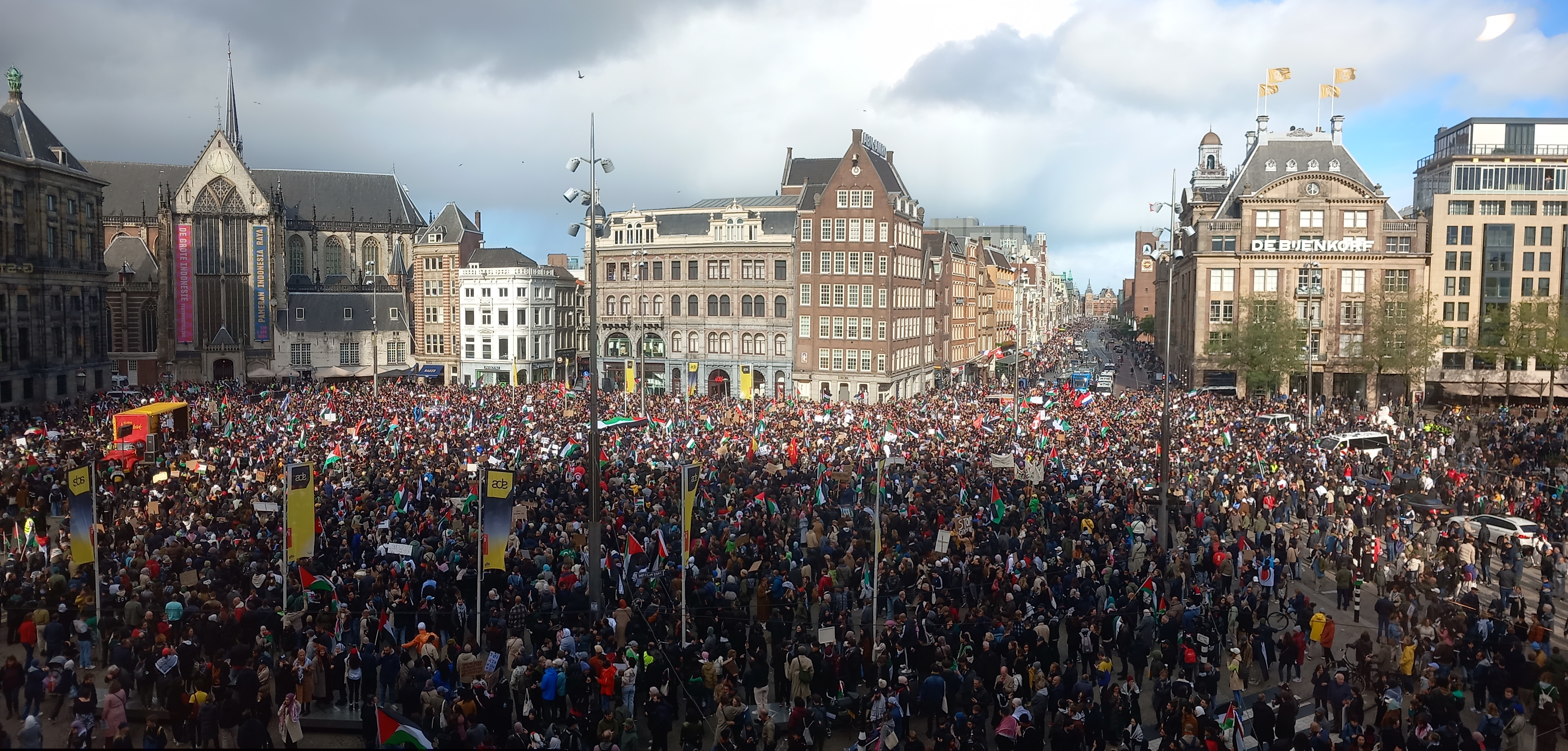
Anti-war demonstrations in Amsterdam on 15 October

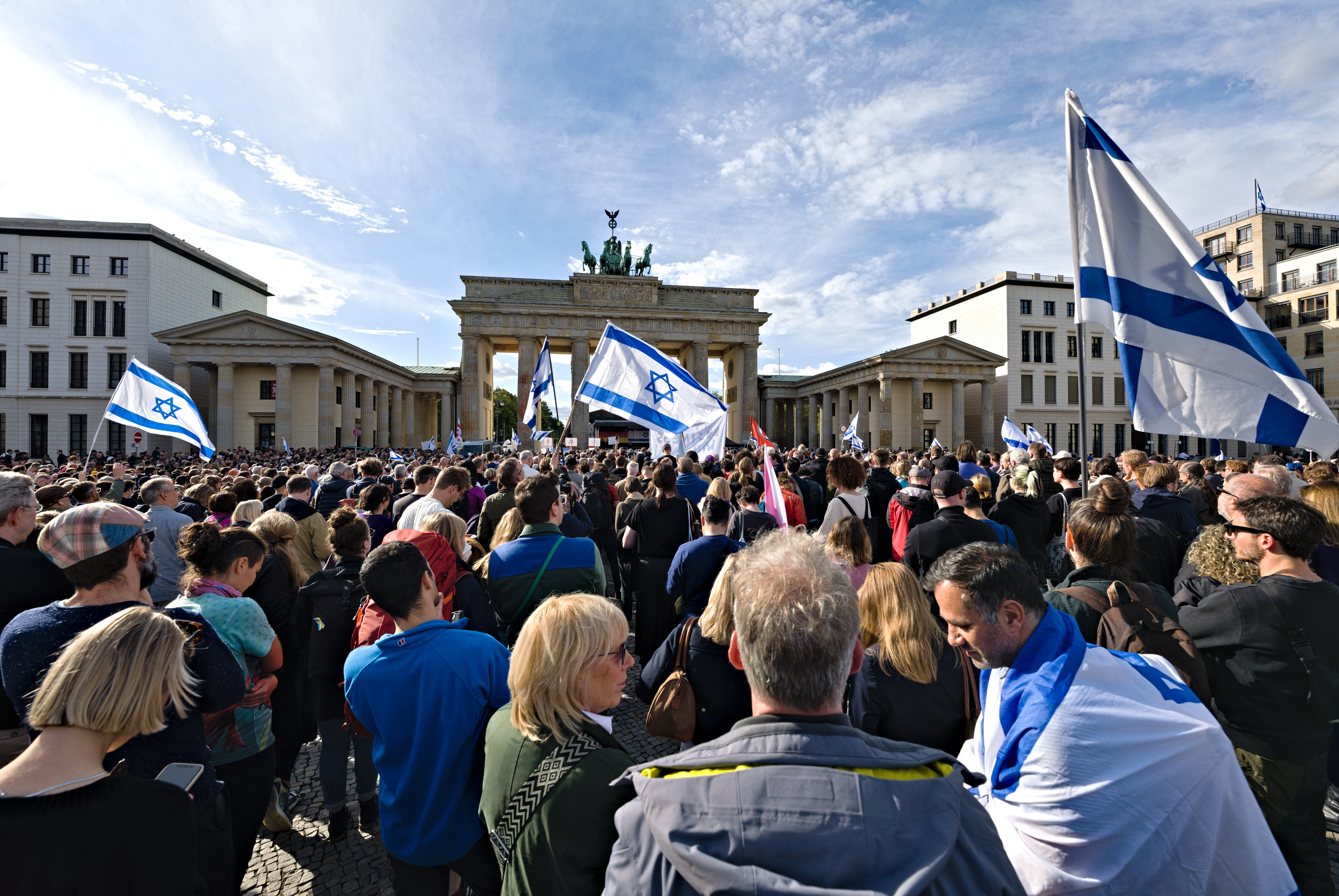
Pro-Israeli protest in Berlin on 8 October

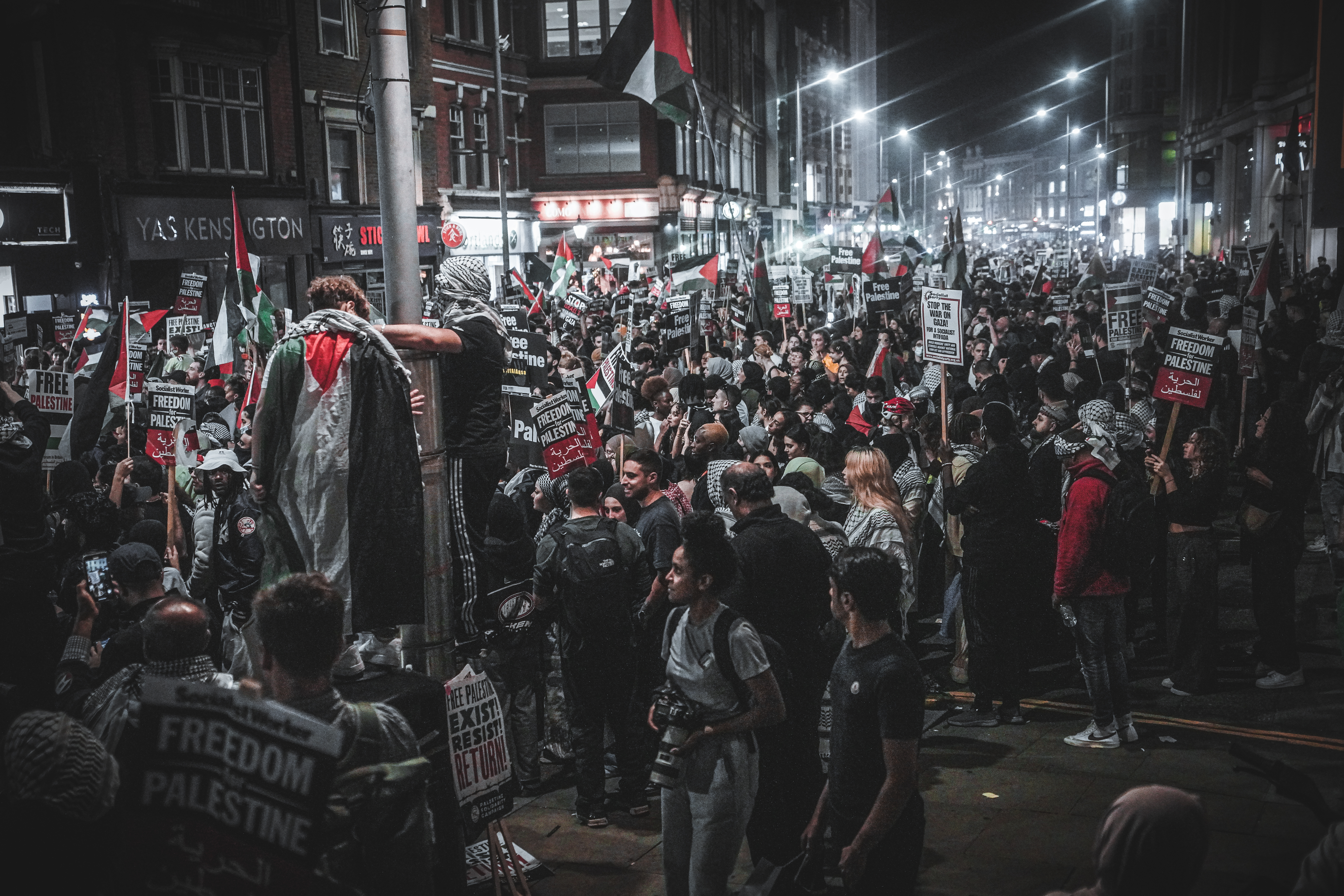
Pro-Palestinian protest in London on 9 October

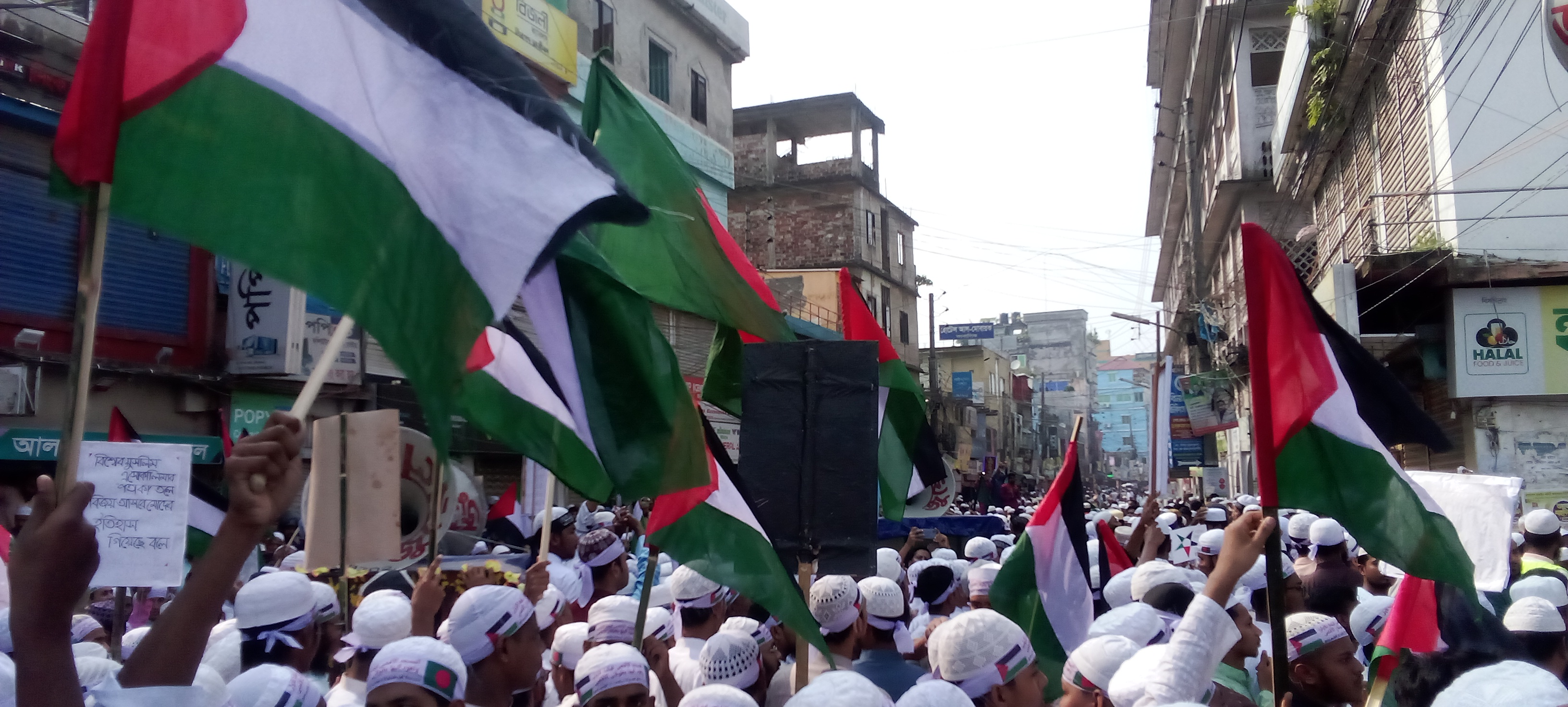
Pro-Palestinian protest in Bangladesh on 13 October

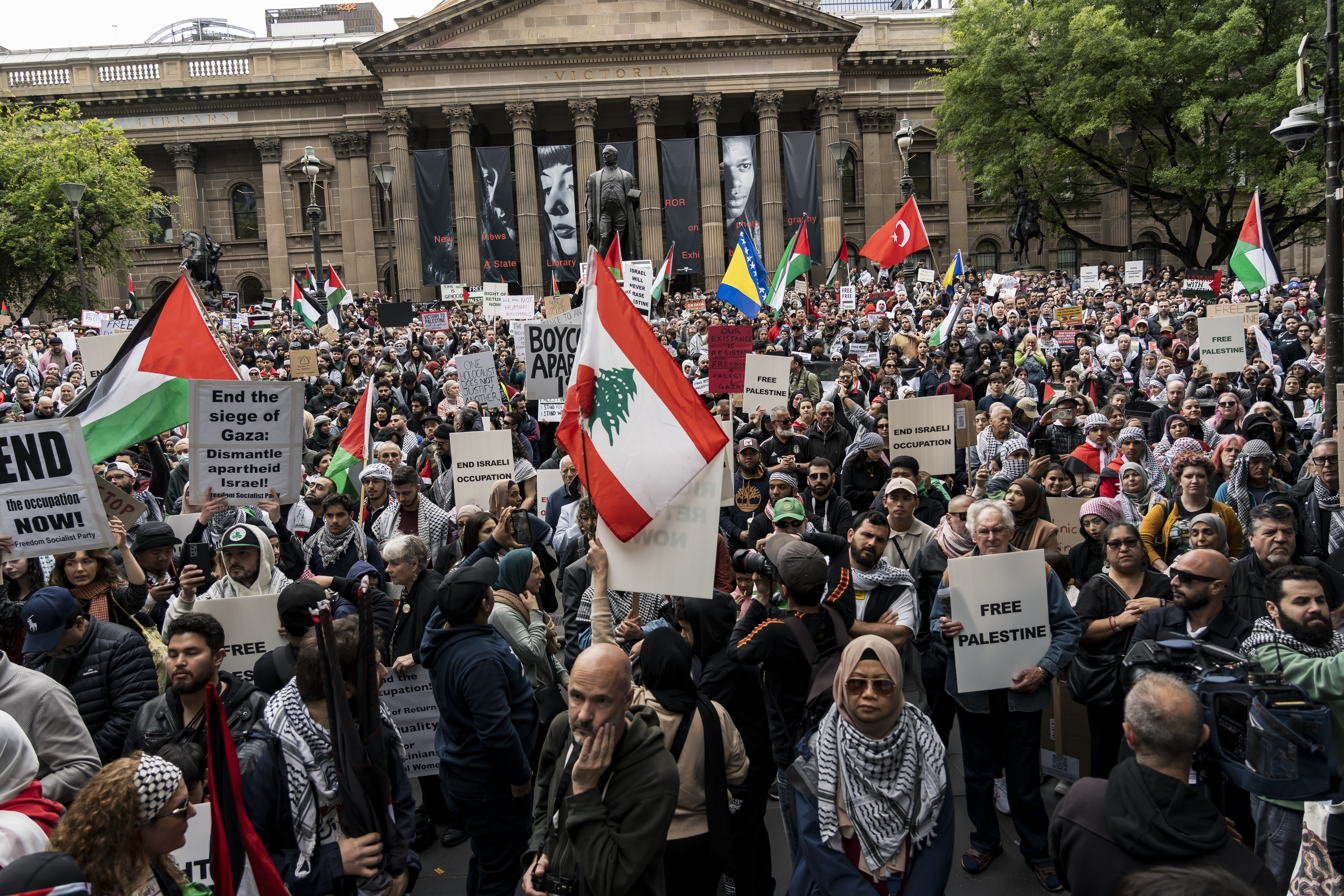
Pro-Palestine protest in Melbourne on 14 October

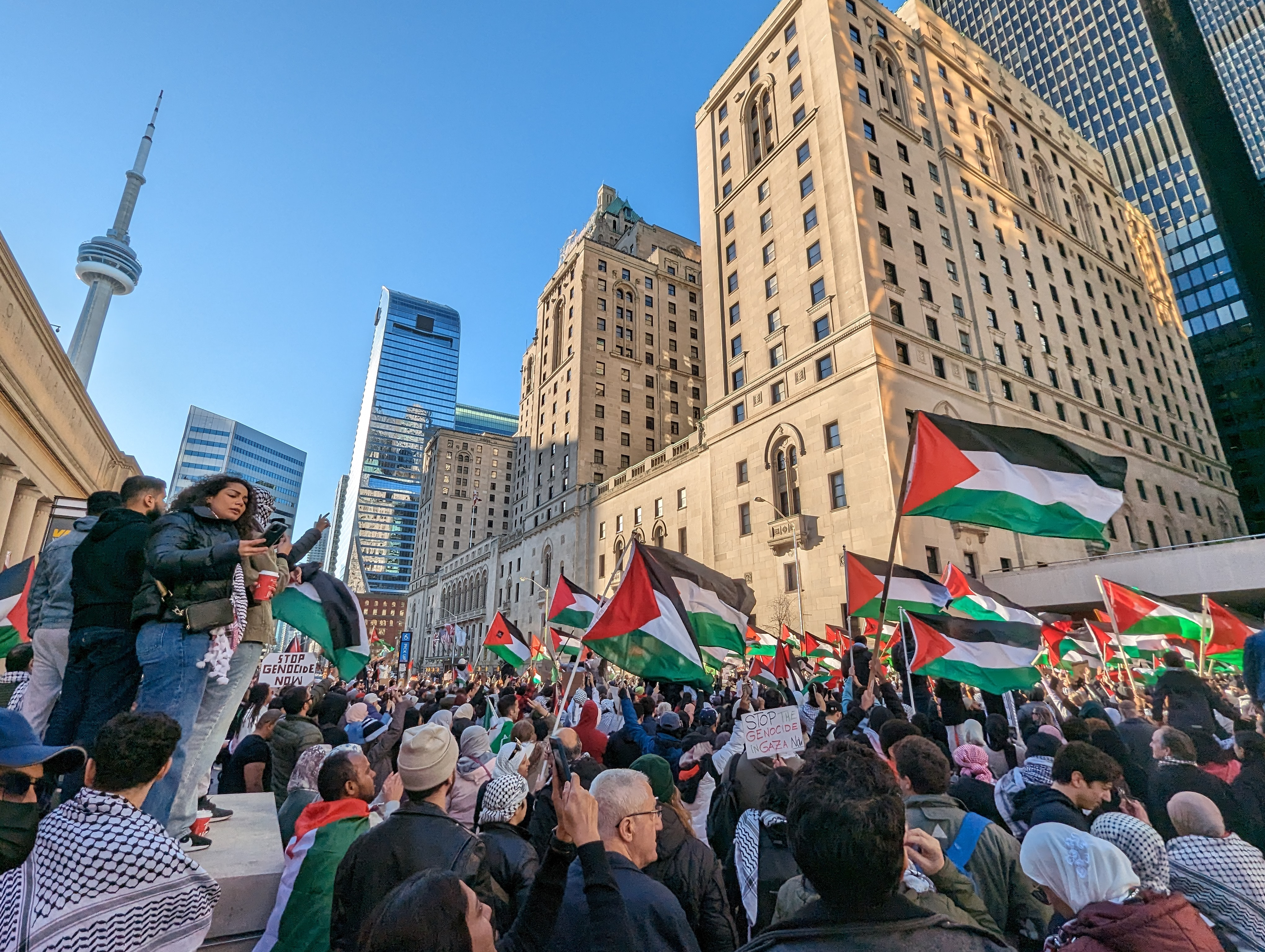
Pro-Palestine rally in Toronto on 28 October

Rallies in support of both Israel and Palestine were held across Canada, as well as the United States. On 9 October, German President Frank-Walter Steinmeier said that he would not tolerate public celebrations of the Hamas attacks. The German Green Party asked for restrictions on organizations which openly support Hamas. The liberal conservative Christian Democratic Union of Germany asked for those who supported Hamas to have their German citizenship revoked. The Central Council of Jews in Germany and the Israeli ambassador both asked for actions to be taken. Chancellor Olaf Scholz announced plans to ban the pro-Palestinian group Samidoun after it was pictured handing out sweets in Berlin to celebrate Hamas' attack on 7 October. Police subsequently banned pro-Palestine demonstrations in Berlin, while French police arrested ten people in rallies in Lille and in Paris' Place de la République after the government issued a similar ban. Amnesty International called on European countries to safeguard the right to protest, saying that many countries "are unlawfully restricting the right to protest".

In the United Kingdom, Foreign Secretary James Cleverly urged Palestine supporters to stay home, saying that their protests were causing concern in the Jewish community. Citing laws prohibiting explicit support for banned organisations, authorities arrested a woman in Brighton for making a speech in support of Hamas at a protest. One rally in London drew an estimated 100,000 protestors in support of the Palestinians. 60,000 people later marched in London to protest against a rise in antisemitism from the war. At an October rally in Dublin Ireland, former justice minister Alan Shatter voiced support for Israel and denounced "the third Reich on the streets of Dublin." Several landmarks, such as Taipei 101, the Sydney Opera House, the Brandenburg Gate, the White House, and the Eiffel Tower, were lit up in the colors of the Israeli flag.

== Boycott of Western companies ==
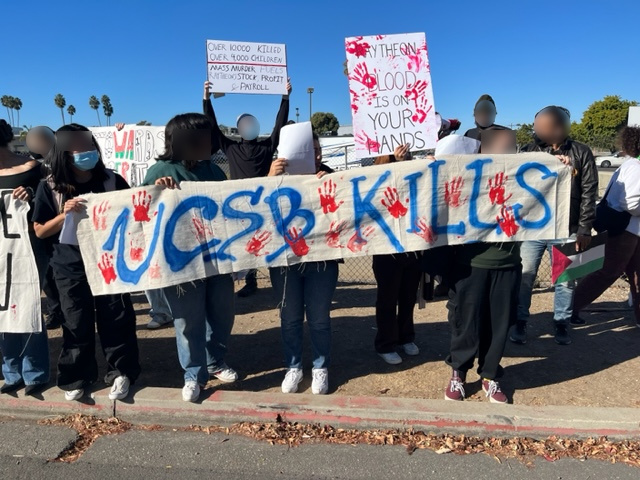
Protest outside Raytheon's office in Goleta, California, 9 November

People in some Muslim countries have boycotted Western businesses, especially American ones such as Starbucks, McDonald's and Coca-Cola, reflecting anger at Western governments' support for Israel. Campaigners in Derry, Northern Ireland persuaded O'Neills to remove Puma products because of the sports brand's sponsoring of the Israeli Football Association. Starbucks was targeted in Keighley, West Yorkshire, with protesters smashing the shop's windows, following the corporation's decision to sue the Starbuck Workers United union after the labour organisation posted on social media support for Palestine.

Direct action was taken at arms factories in the United States and the United Kingdom that supplied arms to Israel, such as Lockheed Martin, General Dynamics, Textron, Boeing, Raytheon Technologies and Northrop Grumman. For instance, on 10 November 2023, trade unionists in Rochester, Kent, blocked the entrances to a BAE Systems factory, stating the facility manufactured military aircraft components used to bomb Gaza; and on 16 November, Palestine Action occupied a Leonardo factory in Southampton, stopping production. ZIM was barred from entering ports in Malaysia.

Student protesters called on Columbia University to financially divest from any company with business ties to the Israeli government, including Microsoft, Google and Amazon. NYU Alumni for Palestine called on New York University to "terminate all vendor contracts with companies playing active roles in the military occupation in Palestine and ongoing genocide in Gaza, namely Cisco, Lockheed Martin, Caterpillar and General Electric".

== Weapons transfers ==
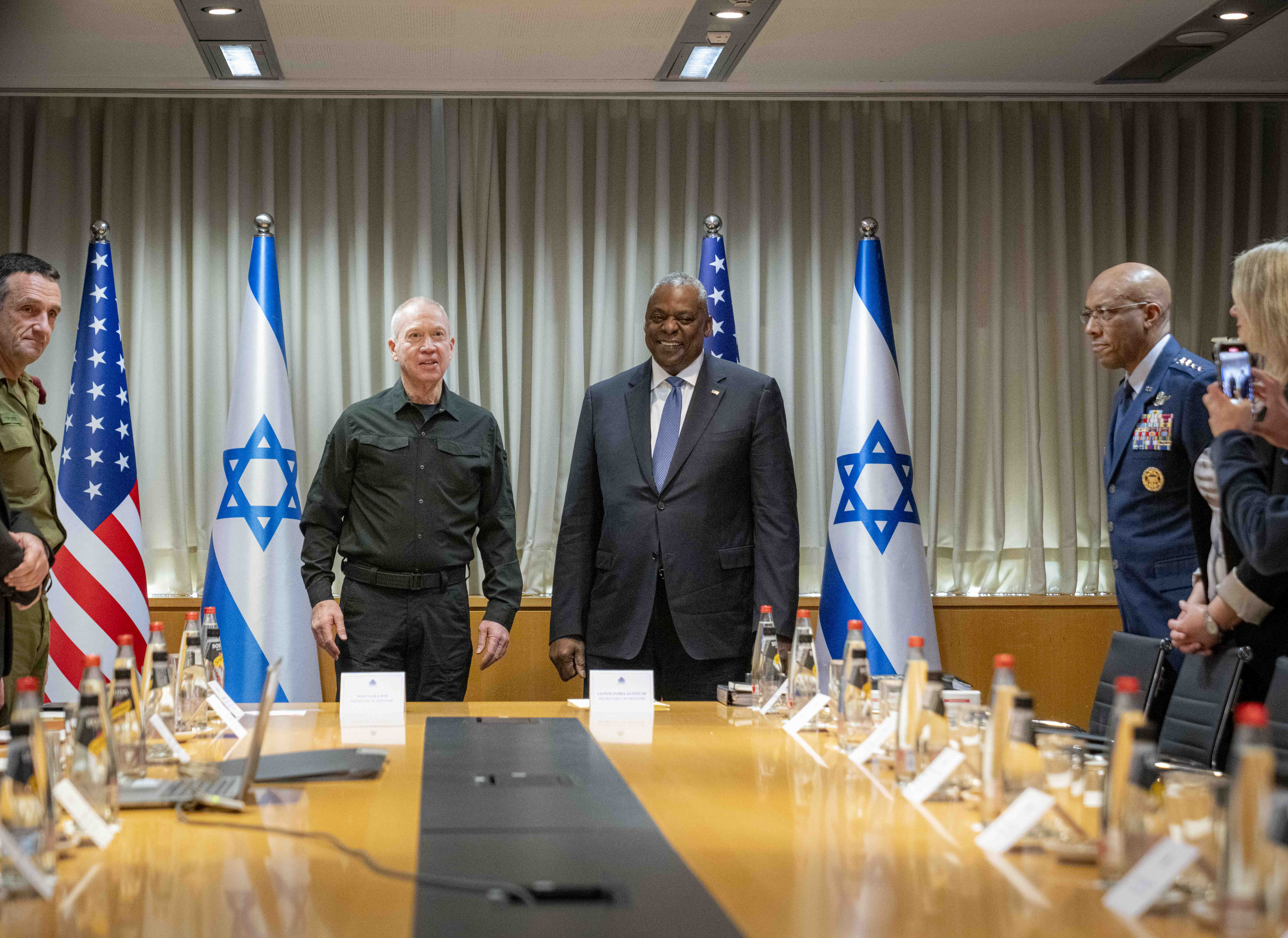
US Secretary of Defense Lloyd Austin, Israeli Defense Minister Yoav Gallant, US Joint Chiefs of Staff Chairman Charles Q. Brown Jr. and Israeli Chief of General Staff Herzi Halevi in Tel Aviv, Israel, 18 December 2023

President Biden called on Congress to pass $14.3 billion in emergency military aid to Israel. The Biden Administration caused controversy after bypassing Congress on multiple occasions to authorize arms sales to the Israeli military.

In December 2023, a Wall Street Journal report stated that US arms shipments to Israel since the start of the war included 15,000 bombs and 57,000 155mm artillery shells, mostly carried on C-17 military cargo planes. U.S. has also sent more than 5,000 unguided Mk82 bombs, more than 5,400 Mk84 bombs, about 1,000 small diameter GBU-39 bombs, and almost 3,000 JDAMs. It also said that some of the bloodiest Israeli attacks on the Gaza Strip involved the use of large US-made bombs, such as the one that destroyed an apartment complex in the Jabalia refugee camp and killed over a hundred people.

The United Kingdom, Germany, France, Canada, Australia, Spain, the Netherlands and Italy also supplied arms to Israel. On 29 February 2024, the European Parliament overwhelmingly rejected an arms embargo on Israel. In May 2024, a group of 300 Australian public servants called on the government to cease weapons transfers to Israel. Serbia's state-owned arms manufacturer, Yugoimport SDPR exported weapons worth around $17.1 million to Israel, using IDF planes and civilian aircraft.

== Evacuations of foreign nationals ==
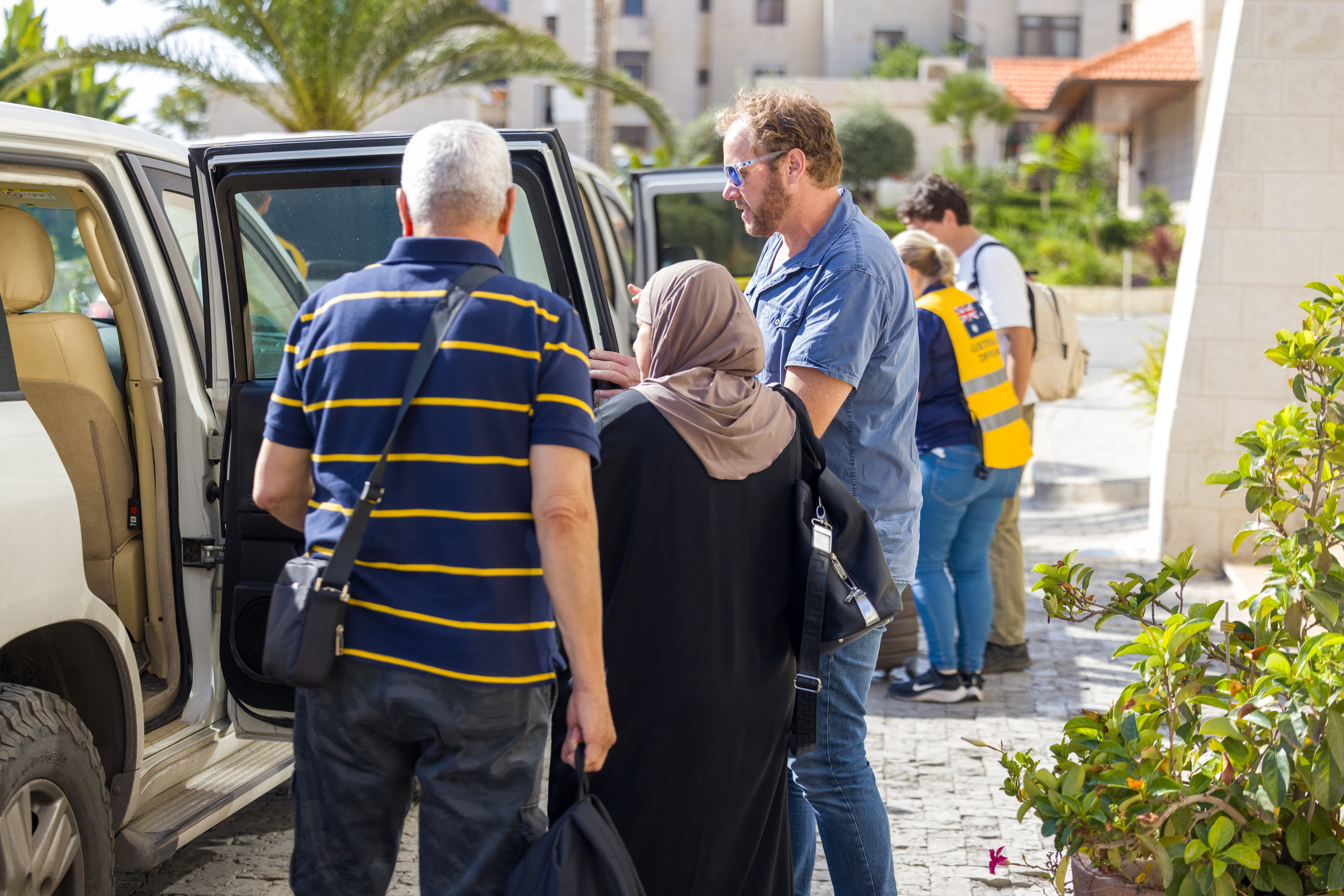
Australia-assisted departures from the West Bank in October 2023

On 8 October, the Brazilian government announced a rescue operation of Brazilian nationals using an Airbus A330 of the Brazilian Air Force, accompanied by doctors and psychologists. Thai Prime Minister Srettha Thavisin put the Royal Thai Air Force on standby to evacuate its citizens if needed. Polish Defence Minister Mariusz Błaszczak announced that two C-130 transport planes would be deployed to evacuate 200 of its nationals from Israel. Hungary evacuated 215 of its nationals from Israel using two aircraft on 9 October, while Romania evacuated 245 of its citizens, including two pilgrimage groups, on two TAROM planes and two private aircraft on the same day. Australia also announced repatriation flights. 300 Nigerian pilgrims in Israel fled to Jordan before being airlifted home.

On 12 October, the United Kingdom arranged flights for its citizens in Israel; the first plane departed Ben-Gurion Airport that day. The government had said before that it would not be evacuating its nationals due to available commercial flights. However, the flights were commercial. Nepal also arranged a Nepal Airlines flight to repatriate 253 of its citizens back home.

By 16 October, New Zealand had evacuated 55 of its citizens through mercy flights organised by the Ministry of Foreign Affairs and Trade and Etihad Airlines. Evacuees were flown to Abu Dhabi, where they were expected to make their own travel arrangements home. 70 New Zealanders remained behind, with 50 in Israel and 20 in the Palestinian Territories. The Foreign Ministry said that commercial options were available for them. India launched Operation Ajay to repatriate people, mostly Indian nationals in Israel. 1,192 people have been repatriated as of 17 October.

== Opinion polling ==
=== Europe ===
In Britain, a YouGov poll conducted on 19 October found that 76% of respondents supported a ceasefire in the Gaza war. An Ipsos poll carried out on 20–23 October, found that 37% of British respondents wanted the UK government to be a neutral mediator in the conflict, 16% wanted Britain to stay out of the conflict at all, 13% would support Israel and 12% would support Palestine. According to a YouGov poll conducted on 7–8 November 2023, older people and Conservatives are more likely to sympathize with the Israelis, while younger people and Labour Party voters are more likely to sympathize with the Palestinians.

According to a poll conducted by the Forsa Institute on behalf of newspaper Die Welt in December 2023, 45% of respondents in Germany agreed and 43% disagreed with the statement "Israel's military action in the Gaza Strip is all in all appropriate". In the immediate aftermath of the Hamas attack on Israel, 44% of Germans said Germany has "a special obligation towards Israel". In December 2023, that number dropped to 37%.

A survey commissioned by Baltic News Service in November found that 38.1% of respondents in Lithuania supported Israel's actions in Gaza, 30.4% did not support and 31.5% had no opinion. Voters of the Homeland Union-Lithuanian Christian Democrats (58.8%), Union of Democrats "For Lithuania", Liberals' Movement and Freedom Party were most in favor of Israel's actions, while voters of Lithuanian Regions Party and People and Justice Union were least in favor.

According to a survey commissioned by the Blick newspaper on 10–15 November, 72% of Swiss respondents believed Israel had a right to defend itself and reply militarily in Gaza while 67% felt Switzerland should temporarily suspend financial aid to the Palestinian occupied territories. At the same time, 58% said Switzerland's approval of the UN resolution for a ceasefire was "fair" or "quite fair".

A survey conducted by the Levada Center from 19 to 25 October 2023 found that 66% of Russian respondents expressed a neutral position on the conflict, 21% sympathized with the Palestinians, and 6% sympathized with Israel. 45% of respondents blamed the conflict's escalation on the United States and NATO (a view promoted by Russian state-controlled media and President Vladimir Putin), while 12% blamed Israel and 8% blamed Hamas.

A survey conducted by the Kyiv International Institute of Sociology from 29 November to 9 December 2023 had 69% of Ukrainian respondents sympathising with Israel compared to only 1% sympathising with Palestine.

=== Middle East ===
In Turkey, a MetroPoll survey released on 25 October found that 34.5% of respondents wanted the government to remain neutral, 26.4% wanted the government to mediate, 18% wanted it express solidarity with the Palestinians while distancing itself from Hamas, and 11.3% wanted it to stand with Hamas.

According to a poll conducted from 31 January to 7 February 2024 by the Group for Analyzing and Measuring Attitudes in Iran (GAMMAN), about 35% of Iranians blame Hamas for the war, 20% blame Israel, and 32% blame both sides.

According to the poll conducted by The Washington Institute for Near East Policy between 14 November and 6 December 2023, 96% of respondents in Saudi Arabia believed that Arab nations should sever relations with Israel, 95% of Saudis did not believe that Hamas killed civilians in its attacks on Israel, and 40% of Saudis expressed a positive view of Hamas.

=== East Asia ===
An 24 October survey in Taiwan from the Taiwanese Public Opinion Foundation had 35.1% of respondents sympathising with Israel, 14.8% sympathising with Palestine, 9.8% sympathising with neither, and 33.6% having no opinion.

=== North America ===
In November 2023, 59% of Canadians approved of the country's support for Israel in the Gaza war, while 18% disapproved.

The Marist Poll published on 15 November found that 38% of Americans believe Israel has gone "too far" in its response to Hamas' attack. It also found that American respondents were more likely to sympathize with Israelis (61%) than Palestinians (30%).

A Quinnipiac study done following war revealed that 76% of American voters believed supporting Israel is in the national interest of the United States, and 64% approved of sending weapons and military equipment to Israel. This support was more pronounced among older age groups, with 51% of those under 35 disapproving of this action. According to a combined NPR/PBS NewsHour/Marist poll, just 48% of millennials and members of Generation Z think that the US should openly support Israel, compared to 83% of the Baby boomers and 86% from the Silent and Greatest Generation (see also Generation Z and the Israel-Hamas war). Gallup polling of Democrats' opinion of President Biden's performance dropped by 11% during October 2023, which was attributed to Biden alienating some members of his party with his swift and decisive show of support for Israel. In November 2023, 31% of participants in a survey in the United States expressed their backing for providing weapons to Israel, whereas 43% expressed their opposition to this notion. The remaining respondents remained uncertain about their stance. Notably, Republicans exhibited the highest level of support for sending weapons to Israel, while approximately half of the Democrats were against it.

In November 2023, a Gallup poll found that 50% of respondents in the United States supported Israel's actions in Gaza, while 45% disapproved. 61% of white American respondents expressed support for Israel while only 30% of people of color did the same. In December 2023, a New York Times and Siena College poll found that 44% of Americans believe that Israel should "stop its military campaign", even at the expense of hostages, while 39% believed the opposite. 48% believed that Israel is "not taking enough precautions to avoid civilian casualties", while 30% believed Israel was doing enough. According to the poll conducted by the Harvard CAPS–Harris Poll on 17–18 January 2024, 80% of American respondents said they supported Israel more than Hamas in the war. 67% said that a ceasefire in Gaza should only happen after the release of all Israeli hostages and the removal of Hamas from power.

In a The Economist/YouGov poll released on 24 January 2024, 35% of U.S. adults agreed that Israel's military campaign against Palestinians amounts to genocide, 36% disagreed, and 29% were undecided. Among U.S. citizens aged 18–29, 49% of those surveyed agreed that Israel is committing genocide, with 24% disagreeing, and 27% uncertain. 74% of American respondents also believed that the initial Hamas attack was genocidal. In an Associated Press-NORC Center for Public Affairs Research poll released on 2 February 2024, 50% of U.S. adults said that the military response from Israel in the Gaza Strip had gone too far, whereas 31% said that it had "been about right", and 15% thought that it had "not gone far enough". In a Center for Economic and Policy Research poll released on 5 March 2024, 52% of U.S. citizens supported ending arms transfers to Israel. 62% of Americans who voted for Biden in 2020 supported halting arms sales, while 14% disagreed, whereas 30% of Trump voters supported the measure, and 55% opposed it. In a Gallup Poll released on 27 March 2024, 55% of the responders in the United States disapproved of Israel's military action in Gaza, 36% approved, and 9% had no opinion. A poll from Generation Lab of 1,250 US college students conducted from 3–6 May reported that 8% had participated in a protest for either side.

=== Opinions of Generation Z in the Western world ===
The views espoused by members of Generation Z in the Western world in response to the war gained the attention of researchers and political analysts, as there is a generational divide between Generation Z and older generations on topics such as the Israeli–Palestinian conflict, Hamas, and the American government's support for Israel. Notably, members of Generation Z were more likely to support Palestine and to oppose Israel than any other generation. According to an October 2023 NPR/PBS NewsHour/Marist National poll which surveyed 1,313 U.S. adults, 48% of Millennials and Generation Z said that the U.S. government should publicly voice support for Israel, compared to 63% of Generation X, 83% of Baby boomers, and 86% from the Silent and Greatest Generation.

Between 13 and 14 December 2023, an online survey was conducted by Harvard University and The Harris Poll among 2,034 Americans from all age groups. While the survey assessed a range of political issues, there were several questions about the Gaza war. While the Harvard-Harris poll found that 73% of those aged 18–24 believed that the 7 October attack was a terrorist attack and 66% of those aged 18–24 believed that the 7 October attack was genocidal in nature, 60% of those polled aged 18–24 believed that the 7 October 2023 attack was justified by Palestinian grievances, with smaller subsets of 50% stating that they sided with Hamas and 51% favoring a one-state solution where Israel would be ended and the land given completely to Hamas and the Palestinians. Furthermore, 67% of Generation Z respondents considered Jews to be oppressors, yet 69% of Generation Z respondents also stated that Israel has a right to exist. Another poll in December 2023 was conducted by More in Common which surveyed various age groups, including Generation Z When members of Generation Z were asked whether they considered Hamas to be a terrorist organisation, Generation Z respondents were the most likely to consider Hamas to be freedom fighters and the least likely to consider Hamas a terrorist organisation.

Some research has credited the stance of Western countries' members of Generation Z to TikTok and social media trends on the platform, with Axios noting that the platform has a large amount of Palestinian content on the website. The site found that 87% of TikTok users who view #StandwithPalestine posts are under the age of 35. In comparison, only 66% of TikTok users who view #StandwithIsrael posts are under the age of 35. A trend was observed of Generation Z TikTok users sharing their conversion to Islam following the Israel-Hamas war. Lorenzo Vidino, director of the Programme on Extremism at George Washington University has attributed this trend to a desire among Generation Z to rebel against Western values. Vidino stated: "At this point, what's more rebellious, what's more anti-Western and anti-capitalism and anti-establishment, than a conversion to Islam?"

== Analysis ==
Hugh Lovatt, a senior policy fellow with the Middle East and North Africa Programme at the European Council on Foreign Relations, analysed in January 2024, that the strong diplomatic and military support from much of the Western world (including US, UK, Germany) to Israel is "at odds with the attitudes of Western publics which continue to shift away from Israel". He said that during the Cold War, Israel sided with the West against the Arab countries supported by the Soviets, and Western leaders generally see Israel "as a fellow member of the liberal democratic club", which partially "explains the continued strong Western support for Israel – which has now largely become reflexive". According to Andrew Stroehlein, writing for Human Rights Watch in October 2024, most countries of the world have supported their own side of the conflict, without caring for human rights.

In an October 2026 opinion piece published in The Guardian, Shada Islam offered a critical assessment of the European Union's handling of the Gaza war. She contended that the EU's reluctance to impose collective sanctions on Israel, introduce bloc-wide trade restrictions, or halt arms sales stood in sharp contrast to its punitive measures against Russia following the invasion of Ukraine. According to Islam, this divergence has damaged the EU's international credibility and cast doubt on the consistency of its stated commitment to human rights.

== See also ==
- Impacts of the Gaza war
- Diplomatic impact of the Gaza war
- Arms embargoes on Israel since 2023
- List of U.S. officials who resigned over Biden's support for Israel in the Gaza war
- Violent incidents in reaction to the Gaza war
- Media coverage of the Gaza war
- Gaza war protests
- Israeli public diplomacy in the Gaza war
- Ninth Extraordinary Session of the Islamic Summit Conference
- Outline of the Gaza war
- Kidnapped from Israel
