= List of Oslo Freedom Forum participants =

The following is a list of persons who have attended the Oslo Freedom Forum (OFF) conferences since its start in 2009. The list is categorized first by country of origin, then by profession and year.

== Afghanistan ==
- Sima Samar (Chairperson of the AIHRC) (2010)
- Manizha Bakhtari (Afghan Ambassador to Norway) (2010)
- Roya Mahboob (Afghan tech entrepreneur and founder of Citadel Software) (2016)

== Argentina ==
- Uki Goñi (Argentinian journalist) (2011)
- Victoria Villarruel (Argentinian lawyer) (2011)

== Australia ==
- Julian Assange (Wikileaks Founder) (2010)

== Austria ==
- Michael Fleischhacker (editor, Austria's Die Presse) (2011)

== Azerbaijan ==
- Malahat Nasibova (Azeri journalist) (2011)
- Emin Milli (writer and activist) (2016)
- Leyla Yunus (Azerbaijani human rights activist) (2018)

== Bahrain ==
- Maryam al-Khawaja (Bahraini rights activist) (2011)

== Bangladesh ==
- Ahmedur Rashid Chowdhury (publisher, writer, and editor from Bangladesh) (2017)

== Belarus ==
- Svetlana Tikhanovskaya (Leader of the Belarusian democratic movement) (2020)
- Zhanna Litvina (Belarusian journalist) (2011)
- Aliaksandr Bialiatski (Belarusian democracy activist and opposition leader) (2009)

== Belgium ==
- Andrew Stroehlein (communications director, International Crisis Group) (2011)

== Brazil ==
- Fernão Lara Mesquita (Brazilian journalist) (2011)

== Britain ==
- Justine Hardy (British journalist and mental health expert) (2011)
- Nick Cohen (British journalist and author) (2012)
- Sarah, Duchess of York(2009)
- Benedict Rogers (author and East Asia team leader, Christian Solidarity Worldwide) (2011)
- Philippa Thomas (BBC anchor) (2011)
- Shiraz Maher (Expert on Islamic extremism) (2015)
- Saad Mohseni (British-born chairman and chief executive of MOBY GROUP) (2015)
- Chris Turner (award-winning stand-up comedian) (2017)
- Clare Rewcastle Brown (British activist) (2018)
- Tiff Stevenson (British stand-up comedian) (2018)

== Bolivia ==
- Victor Hugo Cardenas (former vice-president of Bolivia) (2009)

== Burma ==
- Zoya Phan (Burmese activist) (2011)
- Wai Hnin Pwint Thon (Burmese Activist) (2021)

== Burundi ==
- Gilbert Tuhabonye (Burundian genocide survivor, author, and athlete) (2010)
- Pierre Claver Mbonimpa (Burundian prison reformer) (2010)

== Cambodia ==
- Sophal Ear (scholar of the Cambodian genocide) (2010)
- Somaly Mam (Cambodian author and human rights activist) (2012)
- Mu Sochua (Cambodian politician and rights activist) (2018)

== Canada ==
- Irwin Cotler (former Canadian Minister of Justice and Attorney General) (2012)
- Maziar Bahari (Iranian Canadian journalist and human rights activist) (2018)
- Emmanuel Jal (Sudanese Canadian performer, writer and political activist) (2018)

== Chad ==
- Jacqueline Moudeina (head of the Chadian Human Rights Commission) (2009)

== Chechnya ==
- Lidia Yusupova (Chechen lawyer) (2010)
- Akhmed Zakayev (prime minister in exile, Chechnya) (2011)

== Chile ==
- Andrés Velasco (Chilean economist and former finance minister) (2015)

== China ==
- Jung Chang (author, Wild Swans) (2009)
- Rebiya Kadeer (President, World Uyghur Congress) (2010)
- Yang Jianli (Chinese dissident) (2011)
- Harry Wu (Chinese dissident) (2009)
- Wan Yanhai (Chinese HIV/AIDS activist) (2011)
- Hui Siu Fun (producer, Hong Kong's Pearl and Jade TV) (2011)
- Grace Gao (daughter of Gao Zhisheng, dissident Chinese human rights lawyer) (2017)
- Fang Zheng (Chinese dissident) (2018)
- Chung Ching Kwong (Hong Kong Political & Digital Rights Activist) (2021)

== Colombia ==
- Victor Diusaba (online director, Colombia's El Semana) (2011)
- Belisario Betancur (former president of Colombia) (2011)
- Clara Rojas (Colombian politician, formerly kidnapped by the FARC) (2010)

== Cuba ==
- Yoani Sanchez (Cuban blogger) (via video) (2010)
- Armando Valladares (former Cuban political prisoner) (2010)
- Guillermo Fariñas Hernández (Cuban psychologist, journalist, and political dissident) (2017)
- María Payá Acevedo (Political dissident) (2016)
- Tania Bruguera (Cuban Artist) (2021)

== Czech Republic ==
- Václav Havel (former Czech President) (via video) (2009)

== Denmark ==
- Jacob Mchangama (Danish scholar) (2011)
- Torstein Nybo (co-producer, Burma VJ) (2010)

== Ecuador ==
- Guadalupe Llori (Ecuadorian politician) (2010)
- Xavier Bonilla (Ecuadorean political cartoonist for leading newspaper El Universo) (2017)

== Egypt ==
- Mona Eltahawy (award-winning Egyptian journalist) (2010)
- Wael Ghonim (Egyptian internet activist) (2011)
- Bassem Youssef (Egyptian satirist and television host) (2014)
- Soraya Bahgat (Egyptian-Finnish women's rights advocate and founder of Tahrir Bodyguard) (2013)
- Omar Sharif Jr. (grandson of film star Omar Sharif, actor, model, and LGBT rights activist) (2016)
- Wael Ghonim (Egyptian internet activist and entrepreneur) (2018)

== Eritrea ==
- Filmon Debru (Eritrean Human Tracking Survivor) (2021)

== Estonia ==
- Mart Laar (former Prime Minister, Estonia) (2010)

== Finland ==
- Soraya Bahgat (Egyptian-Finnish women's rights advocate and founder of Tahrir Bodyguard) (2013)

== France ==
- Philippe Douste-Blazy (former foreign minister of France) (2011)

== Gabon ==
- Marc Ona Essangui (president and founder of two organizations in Gabon) (2015)

== Germany ==
- Peter Thiel (co-founder, PayPal) (2010)
- Daniel Domscheit-Berg (founder, Openleaks) (2011)
- Siegmar Faust (German author) (2010)

== Ghana ==
- George Ayittey (Ghanaian economist) (2011)
- Anas Aremeyaw Anas (undercover journalist) (2017)

== India ==
- Vincent Manoharan (Indian Dalit rights advocate) (2011)
- Kenan Malik (Indian-born English free expression advocate) (2015)

== Iran ==
- Kambiz Hosseini (Iranian satirist, actor, and television and radio host) (2015)
- Maryam Faghihimani (Iranian human rights scholar and activist) (2015)
- Marina Nemat (former political prisoner, Iran) (2010, 2011)
- Shirin Ebadi (Iranian Nobel Laureate) (2011)

== Iraq ==
- Vian Dakhil (Iraqi parliamentarian) (2017)
- Omar Mohammed (Iraqi Historian - Founder of Mosul Eye) (2018)
- Ahmed Albasheer (Iraqi Comedian) (2021)

== Israel ==
- Dana Weiss (anchor, Israel's Channel 2 News) (2011)
- Essam Daod (Israeli Psychiatrist) (2021)

== Latvia ==
- Vytautas Landsbergis (former Latvian President) (2009)

== Liberia ==
- Samuel Kofi Woods (Minister of Public Works, Liberia) (2010)
- Leymah Gbowee (Liberian activist) (2011)

== Libya ==
- Ghazi Gheblawi (Libyan writer) (2011)
- Alaa Murabit (Libyan human rights activist and founder of NGO) (2015)
- Asma Khalifa (Libyan women's rights and peace activist) (2018)

== Malawi ==
- Violet Banda (Malawian youth radio host) (2011)
- Memory Banda (Malawian girls' rights activist) (2017)

== Malaysia ==
- Anwar Ibrahim (Leader of the Opposition, Malaysia) (2010)
- Nurul Izzah Anwar (Malaysian politician) (2015)

== Maldives ==
- Mohamed Nasheed (human rights and environmental activist - the Maldives' first democratically elected president, serving from 2008 to 2012) (2017)

== Mauritania ==
- Abdel Nasser Ould Ethmane (founder, Mauritania's SOS Slaves) (2011)

== Mexico ==
- Sandra Rodriguez Nieto (Mexican journalist) (2015)

== Morocco ==
- Ahmed Benchemsi (Moroccan journalist) (2011,12)
- Zineb El Rhazoui (Moroccan born journalist) (2015)

== Nicaragua ==
- Berta Valle (Nicaraguan journalist and human rights activist) (2021)

== Nigeria ==
- Wole Soyinka (Nigerian playwright and poet) (2016)
- DJ Switch (Nigerian Artist) (2021)

== North Korea ==
- Kang Chol-hwan (author, Aquariums of Pyongyang) (2010)
- Park Sang Hak (North Korean democracy activist) (2009)
- Ji Seong-ho (North Korean refugee and president of a North Korean NGO) (2015)
- Grace Jo (North Korean defector, activist, and the vice president of North Korean Refugees in the USA (NKinUSA) (2017)
- Yeonmi Park (North Korean defector and expert on the country's black market economy) (2014)

== Norway ==
- Børge Brende (Foreign Minister of Norway and former managing director of the World Economic Forum) (2015)
- Åsne Seierstad (author, The Bookseller of Kabul) (2010)
- Knut Olav Amas (political editor, Norway's Aftenposten) (2011)
- Hanne Skartveit (political editor, Norway's Verdens Gang) (2011)
- Magne Ove Varsi (indigenous rights leader) (2009)
- Peder Lunde (Norwegian Olympic medallist) (2009)
- Kai Eide (U.N. Special Representative to Afghanistan and Head of UNAMA) (2010)
- Arne L. Lynngård (president of the Rafto Foundation) (2009)
- Jan Egeland (director, Human Rights Watch Europe) (2011)
- Jan Erik Helgesen (president, Venice Commission) (2010)
- John Peder Egenaes (secretary general, Amnesty International Norway) (2009)
- Therese Jebsen (executive director, Rafto Foundation) (2010)
- Fabian Stang (mayor, City of Oslo) (2011)
- Kjell Magne Bondevik (former Norwegian Prime Minister) (2009,10)
- Kristin Clemet (former education minister) (2009,10)
- Erna Solberg (current Norwegian Prime Minister of Norway) (2017)

== Pakistan ==
- Asma Jahangir (leading Pakistani lawyer) (2012)
- Mukhtar Mai (Pakistani women's rights advocate) (2010)
- Maria Toorpakai Wazir (professional Pakistani squash player and women's rights activist) (2017)

== Palestine ==
- Izzeldin Abuelaish (Palestinian doctor) (2011)
- Iyad El-Baghdadi (Palestinian writer from the Arab Spring) (2014)

== Peru ==
- Hernando de Soto (Peruvian economist) (via video) (2010)
- Alejandro Toledo (former president of Peru) (2011)

== Poland ==
- Lech Wałęsa (former Polish president; Nobel Laureate) (2010)

== Romania ==
- Elie Wiesel (author, Night) (via video) (2009)
- Emil Constantinescu (former president of Romania) (2009,10,11)

== Russia ==
- Elena Kostyuchenko (Russian journalist and LGBT rights advocate) (2015)
- Grigory Shvedov (Russian journalist) (2011)
- Mark Belinsky (Digital Democracy) (2010)
- Garry Kasparov (Russian chess grandmaster and democracy advocate) (2010, 2011)
- Vladimir Bukovsky (former Soviet political prisoner) (2009, 2010)
- Vladimir Kara-Murza (Russian opposition activist) (2016)
- Zhanna Nemtsova (Russian journalist, social activist) (2017)
- Mikhail Khodorkovsky (Russian entrepreneur) (2014)
- Alexei Navalny (Russian Activist) (2021)

== Saudi Arabia ==
- Manal al-Sharif (women's rights activist) (2012)

== Serbia ==
- Srdja Popovic (Serbian political activist and founder of Otpor!)

== Singapore ==
- Chee Soon Juan (Singapore Democratic Party leader) (2012)

== Somalia ==
- Leyla Hussein (psychotherapist, writer, specialist on female genital mutilation and gender rights) (2017)

== South Africa ==
- Andrew Feinstein (former South African politician) (2012)
- Busi Kheswa (South African LGBT activist) (2011)
- Lebogang Mashile (South African actress and poet) (2018)

== Spain ==
- Maria Antonia Sánchez-Vallejo (foreign editor, Spain's El Pais) (2011)

== Sudan ==
- Amir Ahmad Nasr (Sudanese blogger) (2011)
- Erik Hersman (co-founder, Ushahidi software) (2011)
- Lubna al-Hussein (Sudanese women's rights advocate) (2010)
- Mohamed Nagi Alassam (Sudanese trade unionist and pro democracy activist) (2020)

== Swaziland ==
- Thulani Maseko (human rights lawyer) (2016)

== Sweden ==
- Claes Arvidsson (foreign editor, Sweden's Svenska Dagbladet) (2011)
- Birgitta Ohlsson (Swedish Minister for European Union Affairs) (2010,11)
- Ludmila Christeseva (Belarus-born Sweden-based artist and art manager / Women Weave for Peace) (2023)

== Syria ==
- Raed Fares (pro-democracy activist) (2017)
- Abdulrahman al-Mawwas (co-founder of the Syrian Civil Defense) (2017)

== Thailand ==
- Pravit Rojanaphruk (Persecuted Thai journalist and dissident) (2015)
- Netiwit Chotiphatphaisal (Student Activist of Chulalongkorn University) (2018)
- Rap Against Dictatorship (rap artist group & political activists) (2019)
- Thanathorn Juangroongruangkit (Thai opposition leader) (2021)

== Tibet ==
- Palden Gyatso (former Buddhist prisoner of conscience) (2009)

== Tunisia ==
- Amira Yahyaoui (Founder of Al Bawsala, a Tunisian NGO) (2015)
- Lina Ben Mhenni (Tunisian activist) (2012)

== Turkey ==
- Leyla Zana (former Turkish political prisoner) (2009)
- Mustafa Akyol (Turkish author and journalist) (2015)
- Elif Shafak (Turkish novelist) (2017)
- Hatice Cengiz (Turkish Activist) (2021)

== Uganda ==
- Kasha Nabagesera (Ugandan rights activist) (2010)

== Uruguay ==
- Luis Almagro (lawyer, diplomat, and 10th Secretary General of the Organization of American States) (2017)

== United Arab Emirates ==
- Iyad El-Baghdadi (human rights activist, Palestinian Emirati internet commentator) (2014)

== United States ==
- Jack Dorsey (Twitter and Square CEO) (2020)
- Gulchehra Hoja (Uyghur Journalist) (2020)
- Larry Diamond (political science professor at Stanford University) (2015)
- Kimberley Motley (American human rights advocate and litigator practicing in Afghanistan) (2015)
- Barbara Demick (author, journalist, and North Korean expert) (2011)
- Benjamin Skinner (author, A Crime So Monstrous) (2010)
- Claudia Rosett (columnist, Forbes magazine) (2010)
- David Andelman (editor, World Policy Journal) (2011)
- Greg Mortenson (co-author, Three Cups of Tea) (2009)
- Jackson Diehl (deputy editorial page editor, Washington Post) (2011)
- Sara Bronfman (American Human Rights Activist in Libya) (2009)
- James Traub (contributing writer, The NYT Magazine) (2010)
- Jay Nordlinger (senior editor, National Review) (2011)
- Jamie Kirchick (writer-at-large, Radio Free Europe) (2011)
- Thomas Glave (American author, professor, Jamaica activist) (2011)
- John Fund (columnist, Wall Street Journal) (2011)
- Michael C. Moynihan (senior editor, Reason magazine) (2010)
- Paul Steiger (chairman, Committee to Protect Journalists) (2011)
- Reihan Salam (columnist, Daily Beast) (2011)
- L. Craig Johnstone (Deputy High Commissioner for Refugees, United Nations) (2009,11)
- Mona Eltahawy (Egyptian-American analyst) (2011)
- James Fallon (neuroscientist) (2011)
- Steven Levitsky (Harvard political scientist) (2011)
- Jack Healey (former executive director, Amnesty International) (2009)
- James O'Neill (Thiel Foundation, Clarium Capital) (2011)
- Jared Genser (president, Freedom Now; legal counsel for Liu Xiaobo) (2010, 2012)
- Kate Hughes (Women for Women International) (2010)
- Mauro de Lorenzo (VP for Freedom and Free Enterprise, John Templeton Foundation) (2010)
- Paula Schriefer (director of advocacy, Freedom House) (2010)
- Zuhdi Jasser (President and Founder, American Islamic Forum for Democracy) (2010)
- Jimmy Wales (founder, Wikipedia; via video) (2010,11)
- Ebele Okobi-Harris (director of business and human rights, Yahoo) (2011)
- Amber Lyon (CNN correspondent) (2011)
- Jody Williams (Nobel laureate) (2011)
- Colin Crowell (internet technology policy expert) (2015)
- Liza Donnelly (writer/ cartoonist, The New Yorker, CBS News) (2016, 2017)
- Joe Lonsdale (American tech entrepreneur, investor, and philanthropist) (2017)
- Carah Faye (American singer and songwriter) (2017)
- Galia Benartzi (American tech entrepreneur) (2018)
- Jason Silva (Venezuelan American television personality) (2018)
- Rick Doblin (American psychedelic drug advocate) (2018)

== Uzbekistan ==
- Mutabar Tadjibayeva (former Uzbeki political prisoner) (2009)

== Venezuela ==
- Marcel Granier (Venezuelan journalist) (2010)
- Diego Arria (former President of the U.N. Security Council) (2010)
- Leopoldo Lopez (opposition leader, Venezuela) (2010)
- Ramón José Velásquez (former Venezuelan president) (via video) (2009)
- Rayma Suprani (Venezuelan political cartoonist) (2015)
- Antonietta Ledezma (Venezuelan human rights activist) (2017)
- Wuilly Arteaga (Venezuelan violinist and activist) (2017)
- Antonio Ledezma (Venezuelan politician) (2018)
- Leopoldo Lopez (Venezuelan politician) (2021)

== Vietnam ==
- Thich Quang Do (Vietnamese religious leader) (via video) (2010)
- Vo Van Ai (Vietnamese human rights activist) (2009)

== Western Sahara ==
- Aminatou Haidar (human rights activist) (2016)

== Yemen ==
- Abdulkarim al-Khaiwani (Yemeni journalist) (2010)

== Zimbabwe ==
- Jestina Mukoko (Zimbabwean human rights activist) (2012)
- Evan Mawarire (Civil rights activist, founder of #ThisFlag movement) (2017)
