= Manohari =

Manohari may refer to:

- Manohari, Uttar Pradesh, a village in Uttar Pradesh
- Manohari, Katihar district, a village in Katihar district, Bihar
- Manohari, Aurangabad district, a village in Aurangabad district, Bihar
- "Manohari" (song), a Telugu-language song from the 2015 Indian film Baahubali: The Beginning

== See also ==
- Manohar (disambiguation)
