= BlueforSudan =

Sudanese social-media movement

#BlueforSudan was a social-media movement that began in Sudan in June 2019 after the death of Mohamed Mattar (Arabic: محمد مطر, romanized: Muḥammad Maṭar), who was shot dead during the Khartoum massacre, a government crackdown on peaceful protesters during the Sudanese Revolution. The movement aimed to raise awareness about the situation in Sudan and show solidarity with the protesters by turning social media platforms blue using the hashtag, resulting in widespread national and international condemnation, which led to an official investigation into the Khartoum massacre.

== Background and context ==
=== Sudanese Revolution ===
In December 2018, protests broke out in Sudan, triggered by a deepening economic crisis. The demonstrations began in the town of Atbara, located in the northeastern part of the country, and quickly spread throughout the country. The Sudanese people were suffering from inflation, rising prices of basic commodities, and a shortage of cash. Many people blamed the government for the economic crisis, which they believed was caused by corruption and economic mismanagement.

The protests were not only about the economy. Sudan's longtime president, Omar al-Bashir, had been in power since 1989 after a military coup, and his regime was known for its repressive tactics against opposition and civil society groups. Al-Bashir's government was accused of human rights abuses, including torture, extrajudicial killings, and restrictions on freedom of expression and the press. The protests, therefore, were also aimed at toppling the authoritarian regime.

The government's response to the protests was brutal. Security forces used tear gas, live ammunition, and other forms of violence to disperse protesters. The government also imposed a curfew and shut down the internet to suppress the spread of information about the protests. However, the protests continued and grew, with more and more people joining in.

The protests sparked a political crisis in Sudan, with calls for al-Bashir's ouster growing louder. In April 2019, after months of protests, the military finally ousted al-Bashir and took control of the government. However, many Sudanese, who continued to demand civilian rule, did not welcome the military's takeover. This led to a standoff between the army and the protesters, with negotiations taking place to determine the country's political future.

=== 2019 Khartoum massacre ===
The mass sit-in at the military headquarters in Khartoum played a significant role in the Sudanese revolution. The sit-in site was located in Khartoum, which started on 6 April near the headquarters of the army, navy, and air force. It became a symbol of the pro-democracy movement in Sudan. It was a place where protesters could gather to demand political change and call for the removal of Sudan's long-serving president, Omar al-Bashir, who had been in power since a military coup in 1989.

The sit-in site was peaceful and became a hub of activity, with protesters setting up a stage for speeches and music, and tents for people to sleep in. It was a place where Sudanese people from different regions, tribes, and religions came together to express their frustration with the government's corruption and poor economic conditions. During that period, Alaa Salah, a 22-year-old Sudanese student of engineering and architecture in Khartoum, became a symbol of the protest movement in Sudan when a photograph of her leading chants during the sit-in went viral in April 2019.

Before the 3 June massacre, the government had attempted to quell the protests with various measures. These included declaring a state of emergency, shutting down the internet, and using a mixture of force and negotiation to try and persuade protesters to disperse. However, the protesters continued, and the sit-in at the military headquarters in Khartoum grew in size and significance, eventually becoming the centre of the revolution in Sudan.

The Sudanese government responded to the protests with more violence. The government used tear gas, live ammunition, and beatings to disperse the protesters. In addition, Rapid Support Forces raided the sit-in site on 3 June 2019, killing 112 and injuring more than 700 protesters and destroying the peaceful atmosphere of the sit-in.

== Emergence and impact ==
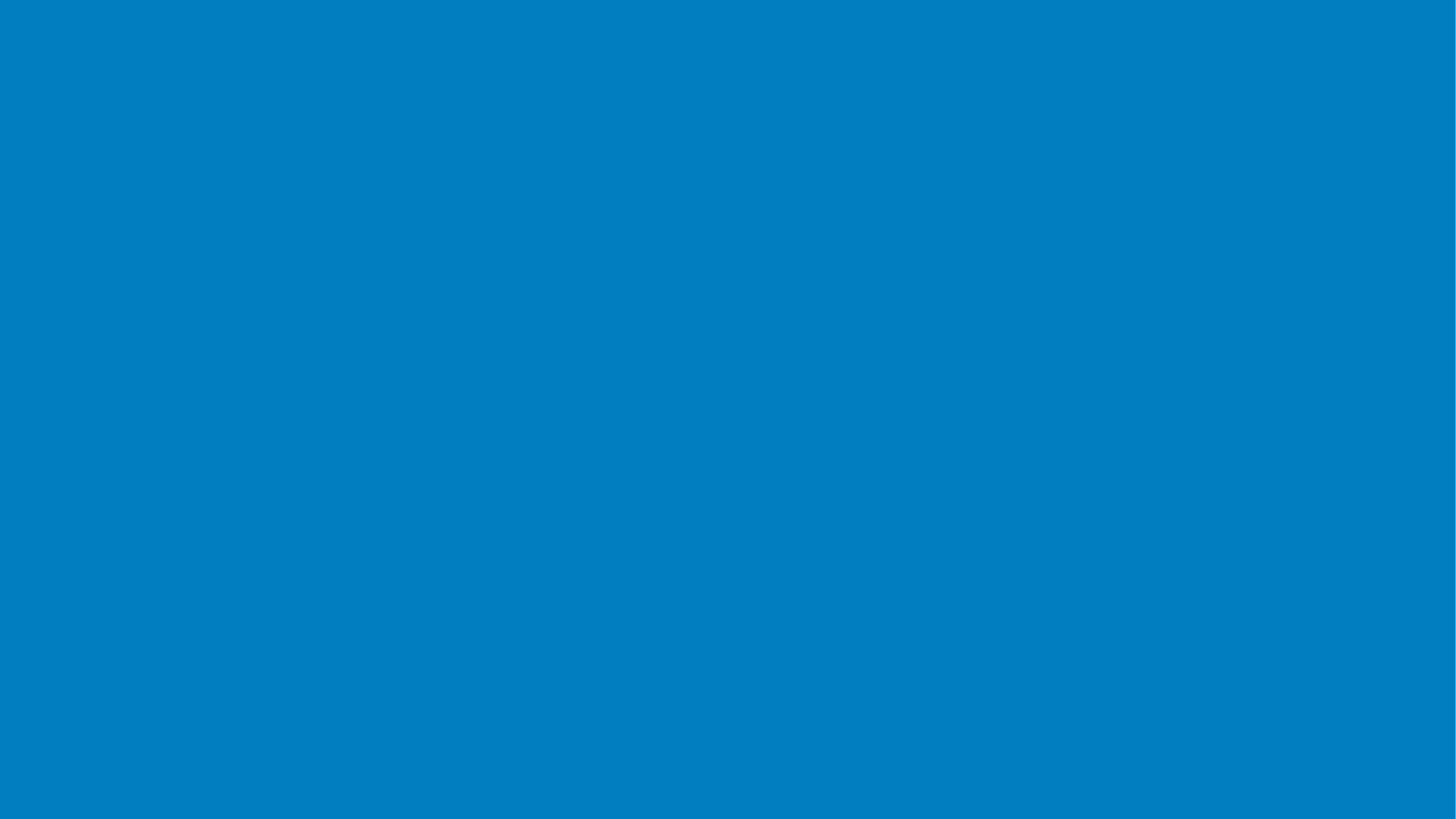
Shade of the blue used for the hashtag

The #BlueforSudan movement began in June 2019 as a social media campaign in response to this crackdown and to raise awareness of the situation in Sudan. The colour blue was chosen because it was the favourite colour of Mohamed Mattar (Arabic: محمد مطر), who was killed during a government crackdown on peaceful protesters. He was one of the 112 people who were massacred in a crackdown on protesters in Khartoum on 3 June 2019.

Mohamed Mattar was a 26-year-old Sudanese activist who was studying engineering at the London Brunel International College (LBIC) and came back to Sudan to participate in the protest. Mohamed Mattar's mother explained that Mattar's choice of blue as his favourite colour was not random but was due to his fondness for looking up at the sky ever since he was a small boy. His death was used by the Sudanese in diaspora to bring awareness about the revolution, Sudanese-American campaigner Remaz Mahgoub explained that "This is an effort to raise awareness as we, the Sudanese diaspora, are the only voice left," explained. His memorial service at LBIC was filled with tributes, poems, music, open letters, and prayer, highlighted how Mattar's death had brought people together in solidarity and sparked further protests across Sudan.

The #BlueforSudan movement inspired people worldwide to produce art, poetry, and music to raise awareness and show their solidarity with the cause. As more and more people shared this content on social media, the movement gained momentum, resulting in a vast array of creative expressions related to the revolution.

The movement quickly gained momentum, with social media users changing their profile pictures to blue as a symbol of solidarity with the protesters in Sudan, and using the hashtag #BlueforSudan. Celebrities and social media influencers have used their platforms to raise awareness about the violence in Sudan, providing information about the atrocities that have occurred and linking to relevant organizations and fundraising campaigns. Rihanna, Ariana Grande, John Boyega, Dua Lipa, Aweng Ade-Chuol, and Naomi Campbell brought attention to the crisis.

However, according to BBC and CNN reports, fake accounts exploited the #BlueForSudan movement by making fake claims about sending aid to Sudan in exchange for clicks. Some of these accounts were suspended.

== Aftermath ==
The Khartoum massacre resulted in widespread national and international condemnation due to the #BlueforSudan and calls for justice from the international community. The Sudanese government initially denied responsibility for the massacre but later admitted that the Transitional Military Council, headed by the Rapid Support Forces (RSF), was responsible. The government also announced that it had arrested several members of the security forces in connection with the killings. However, there were concerns about the fairness and transparency of the government's investigation into the incident.

Protests continued across Sudan following the massacre, with demonstrators demanding justice and a power transfer to a civilian government. Negotiations between the Transitional Military Council and civilian representatives eventually led to the signing of a power-sharing agreement in August 2019, which established a joint civilian-military Sovereign Council and a civilian-led government. The agreement also called for an independent investigation into the Khartoum massacre and other human rights violations committed during the protests.

== See also ==
- Blackout Tuesday
