= University of Kordofan =

Public university in El Obeid, Sudan

- Motto: The pride of the Sudanese Universities
- Type: Public
- Established: 1990; 36 years ago
- Location: El Obeid, North Kurdufan, Sudan; 13.2050°N 30.2379°E
- Vice Chancellor: Prof. Mohamed El Nour Taha
- Website: www.kordofan.edu.sd

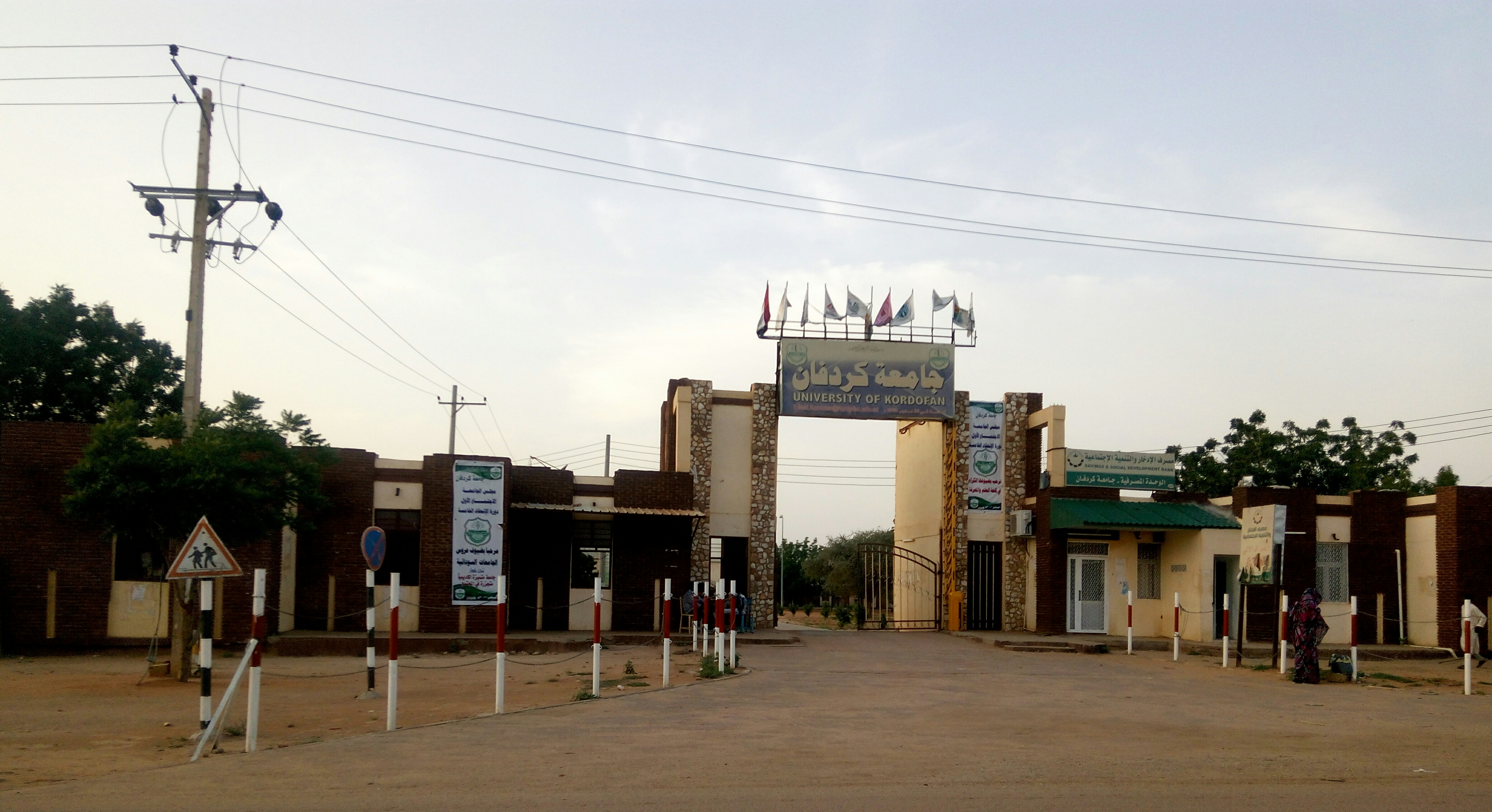
The main campus

The University of Kordofan (Arabic: جامعة كردفان; informally also called Kordofan University) is one of the largest universities in Sudan located in El Obeid 560 km (350 mi) to the southwest of Khartoum. It was founded in 1990 and is recognized as one of the top universities in Sudan. It features several institutes, academic units and research centres, including the Institute of Gum Arabic Research and Desertification Studies, the Centre for Intermediate Technology in Agriculture and a Deanship for Scientific Research and Postgraduate Studies. It is a member of the Federation of the Universities of the Islamic World.

== Admission ==
Undergraduate admission policy is governed by the national Board of Higher Education of Sudan, which sets the minimum admission requirement for secondary school students based on their national origin (Sudanese vs. non-Sudanese) and the secondary-school certificate board.

== Faculties ==
- Deanship for Research and Postgraduate Training
- Faculty of Natural Resources and Environmental Studies
- Faculty of Medicine and Health Sciences
- Faculty of Nursing
- Faculty of Commercial Studies and Business Administration
- Faculty of Computer Science & Statistic
- Faculty of Education
- Faculty of Engineering and Technical Studies
- Faculty of Science
- Faculty of Arts
- Faculty of Community
- Institute of Gum Arabic Research and Desertification Studies
- Center for Peace & Development
- Center for Information Unit

=== Faculty of Medicine and Health Sciences ===
The Faculty of Medicine grants the degree of Bachelor of Medicine, Bachelor of Surgery after finishing six years of studying. With its community-based system, it pays great interest to community medicine, as it starts in the first year and finishes by the end of the fifth year of study. The first batch of students was admitted in 1992; by 2010, 13 batches had graduated and in 2010 the junior batch has the number 20.

Clinical training takes part in hospitals in the city of El Obeid and other rural hospitals in the State of North Kordofan:

- El-Obeid Teaching Hospital
- Al-Kuwaiti Hospital for Children, El Obeid
- Police Hospital, El Obeid
- Army Forces Hospital, El Obeid

The department of Medical Laboratory grants its enrolled students the degree of Bachelor of Medical Laboratory Science after finishing four years of study. Those who qualify for the fifth year will graduate with an honours degree.

The Department of Public Health grants its graduates the degree of Bachelor of Public Health after finishing four years of study.

=== Faculty of Natural Resource and Environmental Studies ===
Faculty of Natural Resource and Environmental Studies grants bachelor's degree in a number of disciplines, such as

- Agricultural Economics and Rural Development
- Animal Science
- Forestry and Pasture
- Biochemistry
- Food Science
- Crop Production and Agricultural Extension

== Libraries ==
The University of Kordofan Library has four branches that are divided on the campus according to the faculties. The main library resides in the central campus and serves students from all other campuses, as it has a wide variety of sources and textbooks. Attached to each library is a computer lab that serves as an online source of knowledge.

== Notable alumni ==
- Sharif Sheikh Ahmed, a Somali politician who served as President of Somalia from 2009 to 2012.
- Mohamed Nagi Alassam, a Sudanese pro-democracy activist and physician who was the spokesman of the Sudanese Professionals Association.

== See also ==
- List of Islamic educational institutions
- List of universities in Sudan
