= Manoharam =

Manoharam may refer to:

- Manoharam (2000 film), a 2000 Indian Telugu-language film
- Manoharam (2019 film), a 2019 Indian Malayalam-language film by Anvar Sadik

== See also ==
- Manohar (disambiguation)
- Manoharan, Indian surname
- Manohara, Buddhist folklore
- Manohara (film), a 1954 Indian Tamil-language film by L. V. Prasad
