= Prayanam (1975 film) =

- Directed by: Bharathan
- Written by: Padmarajan
- Produced by: Bharathan
- Starring: Mohan Sharma; Kottarakkara; Master Raghu; Lakshmi; Kaviyoor Ponnamma; Nanditha Bose
- Cinematography: Balu Mahendra
- Edited by: N. P. Suresh
- Music by: M. B. Sreenivasan; Lyrics: Vayalar Ramavarma; Bichu Thirumala; Yatheendradas
- Production company: Ganga Movie Makers
- Release date: 20 June 1975
- Country: India
- Language: Malayalam

Prayanam (transl. The voyage) is a 1975 Indian Malayalam-language feature film written by Padmarajan and directed by Bharathan. It was the debut of both Padmarajan and Bharathan. The writer-director duo is often credited for revolutionising Malayalam cinema with their expressive and innovative works.

Prayanam stars Mohan Sharma, Kottarakkara Sreedharan Nair, Master Raghu, Lakshmi, Kaviyoor Ponnamma and Nanditha Bose. It probes into the realities that existed within the Brahmin community of the day. Kottarakkara Sreedharan Nair plays an elderly Brahmin priest married to a girl young enough to be his daughter.

Bharathan produced the film as well as did the art direction. Music is composed by M. B. Sreenivasan with lyrics by Vayalar, Yatheendra Das and Bichu Thirumala. Bharathan remade the film in Tamil as Savithiri in 1980, but could not repeat the success of the original. Before Prayanam, Bharathan had worked as an art director with directors, including PN Menon, A. Vincent, Kunchacko, Thoppil Bhasi, and Hariharan.

== Plot ==
Savithrikkutty, the eldest daughter of an aged poor Nambuthiri Brahmin is married off to an aged widower (a priest) of the same caste. The new family where she is received comprises two other members, Appu (the man's son who is just a boy) and Amminiyamma. Amminiyamma's son is working in a distant place. Until Savithri's arrival she was the sole helper of the widower. The age disparity between the man and Savithri causes their sexual life to be without colors. The man soon engages himself in temple matters and the woman, finding no better way to kill time plays with the man's kid and does her chores without charm. One day a young man named Aravindan comes to his ancestral house in the village. On his way he meets aged people who stare at him as if they have not seen a young man lately. His uncle, Kizhakkethil Raman Menon receives him cordially who reminisces his (Menon's) valiant efforts at a time when his elders would frown upon education, to send his sister, Aravindan's mother, to her studies in the city. However we come to know that city culture has destroyed her soft sides and that she now lives an unorganized life of an addict to intoxicants. Meanwhile, Appu, the boy-child of the priest, easily makes friends with his new wife Savithri. Strong child-mother affection develops between Appu and his stepmother Savithri. On some day, at a ritual performance, Aravindan and Savithri encounters each other for the first time. Aravindan, basically of a wandering nature does nothing significant after his arrival to the village. He then meets Savithri and their relationship develops sooner as the two can easily associate with one another's sorry lives. Aravindan, who was not cared well by his mother and as somebody who earlier had many unfulfilled and failed relationships with other women was looking for somebody who could actually understand and resonate his feelings. He then realizes Savithri to be exactly the kind of person he should have met. Gradually their romantic dreams develop without anyone suspecting them. The priest who is now completely engrossed in his temple rituals does not suspect her in any way until one day when he catches her with him in an amorous act. As a cheated husband he thinks it is his dharma (now that the girl Savithri sinned), as taught by his guru to send her back to her home. He sends her back. Savithri's father who was also the priest's understands her dilemma and is supportive of her and unhappy about the way his disciple whom he brought up in that very home, abandoned her. Meanwhile, Amminiyamma decides to reconcile the two and arrives at Savithri's house to request her father to ask the priest to receive Savithri back. The father makes his unhappiness clear and asserts how important his children are to him. However Savithri herself returns promising she will not make the mistake again. However the priest holds his ego higher and keeps distance from her. Thoughts of Aravindan's care and love start tormenting her one way or other. During the temple festival when every member of the family is off to the temple she decides to stay in the house, not wanting the people to gossip about her and the family. Holding the music box gifted by Aravindan, memories of the sweet days visit her. Unexpectedly Aravindan arrives there and the two embrace each other on the background of the sound and play of the temple fireworks. The two stare at the fireworks happy but confused and anxious about their future. The next day she leaves a note to Appu encouraging him to forge his own path than abide by external forces, along with the music box which he had wanted. It is unclear what was the step she and Aravindan took. A distraught Appu throws away the music box in the river and leaves..

== Cast ==
- Mohan Sharma as Aravindan
- Kottarakkara Sreedharan Nair as Brahmin priest
- Master Raghu as Appu
- Veeran
- M. S. Namboothiri
- Lakshmi as Savithri
- Kaviyoor Ponnamma as Amminiyamma
- Nanditha Bose as Aravindan's mother
- Treesa Rani K J as Savithri’s sister

== Soundtrack ==
The music was composed by M. B. Sreenivasan with lyrics by Vayalar Ramavarma and Bichu Thirumala.

No.	Song	Singers	Lyrics	music
1	"Brahma Muhoortham"	Manoharan,	Vayalar Ramavarma	M. B. Sreenivasan
2	"Chandrotsavathinu"	K. J. Yesudas,	Vayalar Ramavarma	M. B. Sreenivasan
3	"Maunangal Padukayayirunnu"	S. Janaki, K. J. Yesudas	M. B. Sreenivasan	
4	"Polallee"	Latha Raju,	Yatheendradas	M. B. Sreenivasan
5	"Sarvam Brahmamayam"	K. J. Yesudas, Chorus	Bichu Thirumala	M. B. Sreenivasan

== Awards ==
Kerala State Film Awards

- Best Child Artist - Master Raghu
- Best Cinematography (Black-and-white) - Balu Mahendra
- Best Art Direction - Bharathan
