= Khartoum massacre =

2019 mass-killing in Sudan

- Part of Sudanese Revolution
- Khartoum (Sudan)
- Location: Khartoum, Sudan
- Date: 3 June 2019
- Target: Sudanese protesters
- Attack type: Mass murder
- Deaths: 128+
- Injuries: 650+ injured and 70 raped
- Perpetrators: Sudanese Armed Forces (SAF), Rapid Support Forces (RSF), Janjaweed militias and TMC security forces
- Motive: Dispersing sit in camp

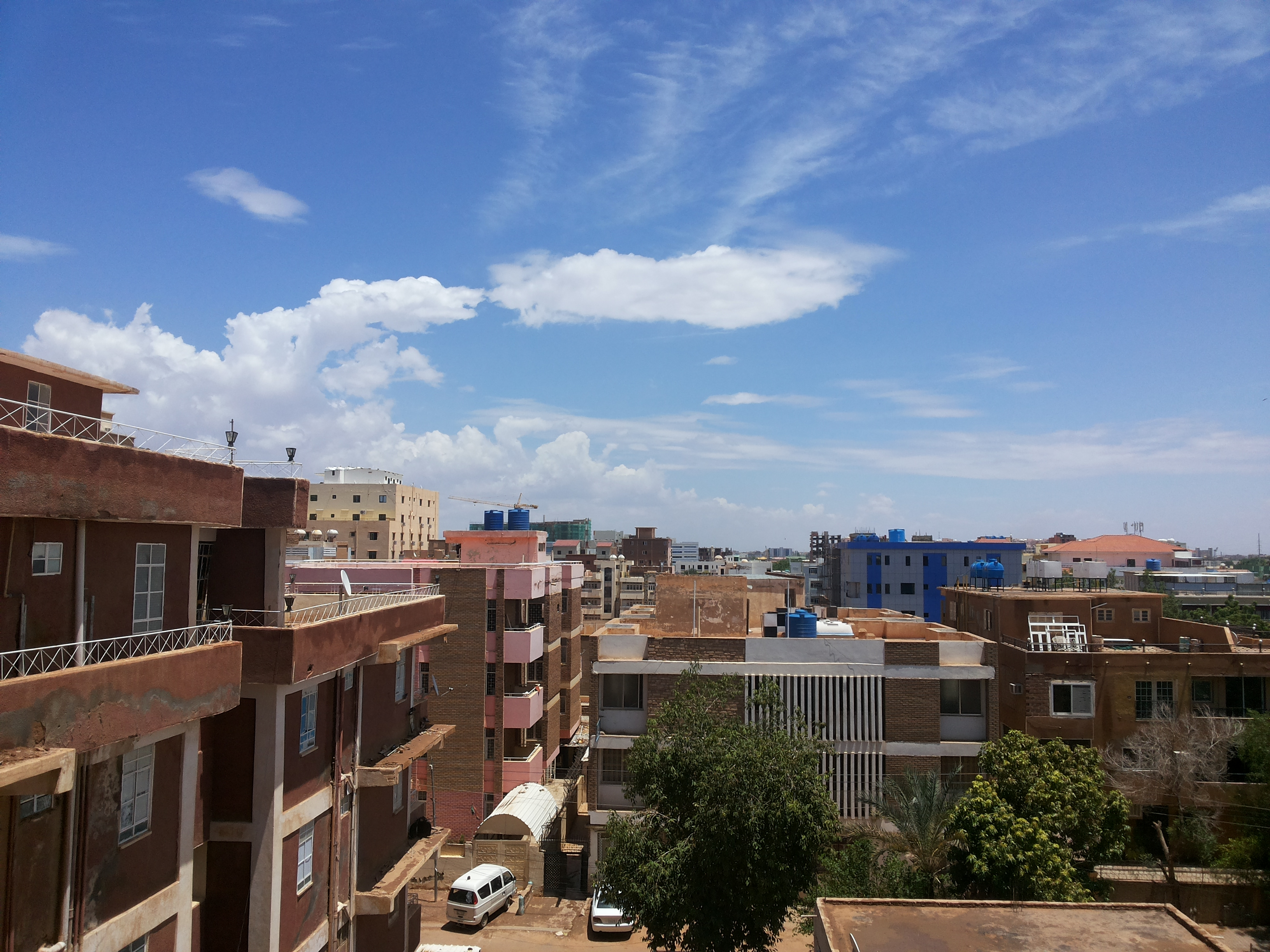
Khartoum City

The Khartoum massacre occurred on 3 June 2019, when the armed forces of the Sudanese Transitional Military Council, headed by the Lieutenant-General Abdel Fattah Abdelrahman Burhan of the Sudanese Armed Forces (SAF) and his deputy, Mohamed Hamdan Dagalo of the Rapid Support Forces (RSF), the immediate successor organisation to the Janjaweed militia, used heavy gunfire and tear gas to disperse a sit-in by protestors in Khartoum, killing over 100 people. It has been difficult to assess the actual number killed. At least forty bodies were thrown in the River Nile. Hundreds of unarmed civilians were injured, hundreds more were arrested, many families were terrorised in their home estates across Sudan, and the RSF raped more than 70 women and men. The Internet was almost completely blocked in Sudan in the days following the massacre, making it difficult to estimate the number of victims.

In October 2019, during the 39-month planned transition to democracy, an official Khartoum massacre investigation commission was created as required under Article 7. (16) of the Sudanese August 2019 Draft Constitutional Declaration, under the authority of transition period Prime Minister Abdalla Hamdok. The commission is led by human rights lawyer Nabil Adib Abdalla and with no female members, to the objection of the No to Oppression against Women Initiative.

== Background ==
Sudanese protests started in December 2018, leading to the removal of Omar al-Bashir by the military in a coup d'état, and the establishment of a Transitional Military Council (TMC) which is headed by the Lieutenant-General Abdel Fattah Abdelrahman Burhan.

Following intense protests, Awad Ibn Auf announced his resignation and said that he had chosen Lieutenant-General Abdel Fattah Abdelrahman Burhan to lead the TMC. Protesters supported by the Sudanese Professionals Association (SPA) and democratic opposition groups engaged in street demonstrations, calling on the ruling Transitional Military Council to "immediately and unconditionally" step aside in favour of a civilian-led transitional government, and urging other reforms in Sudan. For about two months the TMC engaged the SPA in dialogue and discussion on how to shift to a transitional government, disagreeing over whether the transitional government should be civilian-led or military-led. And during the official discussions, there were many attempts on the TMC’s part to disperse protesters and clear the sit-in in front of the Military HQ in Khartoum.

On 30 May, the SPA expressed concern that a lethal attack by the TMC was intended, stating that on 29 May, "two citizens including a pregnant lady were shot dead by the TMC forces." The SPA warned that military trucks of NISS, the RSF, and other state security forces were accumulating around the area of the sit-in. On 1 June, the SPA said that it had reason to believe that the TMC was "planning and working to end the peaceful sit-in at the headquarters with excessive force and violence" after three people were killed in incidents on the fringes of the demonstration during the previous week.

== Massacre ==
On 3 June 2019, the military armed forces of the TMC headed by the Sudan Armed Forces and the Rapid Support Forces, the succeeding front organization to the Janjaweed militia and NISS, together with other TMC forces used heavy gunfire and tear gas as well as sound bombs aiming at dispersing the sit-in killing more than 100 people with difficulties in estimating the actual number.

Estimating the number of victims was difficult in the days following the massacre because of Internet blockage and the deployment of brutal military forces across the capital. The Internet in Sudan was almost completely blocked during and following the massacre, a signature move of the TMC, on which the Janjaweed militias had a wide presence throughout Khartoum and prevented documenting the number of victims.

As of the evening of 4 June 2019, there were reports of a large number of victims in the field of the sit-in with difficulty evacuating them. There were several reports of bodies thrown into the Nile. Hundreds of unarmed civilians were injured, hundreds of unarmed citizens were arrested, and many families were terrorized in their home estates across Sudan. Seventy women and men were raped by the RSF according to doctors in Khartoum hospitals.

On 9 June, witnesses reported the smell of rotten corpses coming from drainage channels and suspected that soldiers had thrown victims there.

In total, more than 200 military vehicles were used in the attack, with more than 10,000 soldiers and other unidentified personnel in police uniforms.

=== Timeline ===
The following is a timeline of what took place in the Khartoum sit-in camp:

- 4:30 am: Janjaweed militias and NISS with other TMC forces started surveying the area of the sit-in camp in preparation for the attack.
- 4:55 am: Around 100 military vehicles belonging to Janjaweed militias, armed with heavy military firearms, including anti-aircraft weapons and carrying hundreds of armed soldiers. These soldiers were carrying weapons and sticks when they surrounded the Military HQ in Khartoum. The cars prevented the unarmed civilians from entering the Military HQ. Simultaneously, another 100 white pick-up trucks without number plates, full of soldiers in police uniforms, arrived. Other Janjaweed soldiers were also seen in huge numbers along Nile Street.
- 6:00 am – onward: The joint forces started the attack on the sit-in camp using live bullets, sound bombs and teargas, storming the civilians from all directions, leaving a narrow path for protesters to exit. The militia started burning the tents and shooting indiscriminately, leaving hundreds dead and injured and throwing many bodies into the Nile.

According to local resident and PhD student Mohammed Elnaiem, the first phase of the attack included discussion between RSF members and the regular army, and in the second phase, the army vehicles departed while RSF vehicles "drove through the barricades. Following the massacre, some bodies were recovered that wore uniforms belonging to the Sudanese Army. Activists concluded that there had been army soldiers who refused to attack the protestors or had attempted to protect them, whereupon they too had been murdered. Nahid Jabrallah attributed the murders to the RSF. After the main attack, the RSF shot wounded protestors in three Khartoum hospitals.

Sit-ins in Port Sudan, el-Gadarif and Sinja were also "raided and attacked by the RSF" on 3 June.

=== Mass rapes ===
France 24 documented evidence that the rapes of 70 women and men during the massacre were a deliberate campaign to "break the girls". Nahid Jabrallah, founder of the Sima Centre for Women and Children's Studies, and other activists and journalists, stated that there were extensive testimonies of gang rapes and other sexual violence by the RSF during the 3 June attacks. Huma, an activist, said that RSF soldiers humiliated women by asking them to remove their underwear. Online social network images showing women's underwear on a pole and a room full of women's clothing were considered "unverified" as of 20 June 2019. Jabrallah stated that "everyone was threatened with being raped if they resisted the RSF's orders."

International criminal lawyer Celine Bardet of We are not Weapons of War said that evidence gathering for the systematic use of sexual violence as a tool of war needed separate consideration to other evidence gathering, because of social stigma against women testifying about the events. Bardet said that, as of June 2019, evidence was being collected about "a fair amount of sexual violence" that might be used as evidence of an international crime, if the sexual violence were "systematic, targeted and [had] a specific objective". Activist Dalia El Roubi stated that "the symbolism behind the rape of women is very substantial, it's aimed at breaking society" and that the sexual violence of the 3 June massacre was a deliberate action by the RSF to "break" communities in a similar way to which communities were "broken" in Darfur.

Pramila Patten from the United Nations (UN) called for a UN human rights monitoring team to be sent to Sudan and for "rapes and gang rapes of protesters, women's rights defenders and women medical personnel working in hospitals near the sit-in" to stop.

Hala al-Karib, writing in Al Jazeera English, said that local activists provided systematic support for the rape victims, "[extending] their hands to the hundreds of male and female sexual violence survivors and the families of those who were killed" with "discipline and the commitment to support the survivors of violence". Al-Karib said that the activists "understood the root causes and politics behind sexual violence" and "approached sexual violence as a crime connected [to] power relations", while "not [undermining] how personal it is as a crime". Al-Karib criticised the lack of support from international "multimillion-dollar agencies and NGOs" with "fancy conference rooms to strategise in", stating that the "actors that are traditionally tasked with addressing sexual violence [remained] unable or unwilling to end Sudan's sexual violence epidemic and help its survivors achieve justice."

== Victims ==
On 12 June 2019, the Sudanese Doctors' Syndicate published a list of 104 people that were killed on or after 3 June, including 12 children. The majority of the victims were killed by gunfire, while others were stabbed to death, burned, or had their skulls crushed after being run over by Janjaweed pick-up trucks. The list below includes the name of the victim (some unidentified), the date of death, age, hospital and cause of death as indicated by the Sudanese Doctors' Syndicate:

No.	Name	Date of death	Age	Hospital	Cause of death
1	Abdel Salam Keisha Adel Salam	3 June	25	El Mualim Hospital	Gunshot
2	Mujtaba Salah Ahmed al-Hadi	3 June	No data	Sit-in Field Clinic	Gunshot
3	Ali Mohammed al-Noor	3 June	25	El Mualim Hospital	Gunshot
4	Said Mohammed Said	3 June	39	Ibrahim Malik Teaching Hospital	Gunshot
5	Mohammed Hashem Salah Matar (also: Mohamed Mattar)	3 June	26	No data	Gunshot
6	Salah Uddin Said al-Dawleh Abdurrahman Ali Taha	3 June	26	El Mualim Hospital	Gunshot
7	Al-Numan Ragab Kafi	3 June	29	Bashair Teaching Hospital	Gunshot
8	Ahmed Mohammed Al-Faki	3 June	29	El Mualim Hospital	Gunshot
9	Faiza Ahmed Othman	3 June	60	Al Jawda Hospital	Gunshot
10	Murad al-Tijani Mohammed Haj al-Khader	3 June	6	Alazhari	Gunshot
11	Huzaifa Mohammed Abdullah	3 June	15	El Mualim Hospital	Gunshot
12	Burai Mutasem Saifuddin	3 June	18	Royal Care International Hospital	Gunshot
13	Faisal Abdel Aziz Abdullah	3 June	38	Royal Care International Hospital	Gunshot
14	Abbas Farah Abbas	3 June	27	Royal Care International Hospital	Gunshot
15	Ismail Ali Abdel Hadi	3 June	42	Royal Care International Hospital	Gunshot
16	Adam al-Doma	3 June	40	El Mualim Hospital	Gunshot
17	Mahmoud Abdullah al-Amir	3 June	22	Al-Arbaeen Specialized Hospital	Gunshot
18	Daw al-Beit Ibrahim Mokhtar	3 June	28	Armed Forces Hospital (Al-Silah Al-Tibi Hospital – Khartoum)	Gunshot
19	Othman Abdeen Mahmoud	3 June	28	Armed Forces Hospital (Al-Silah Al-Tibi Hospital – Khartoum)	Gunshot
20	Hanafi Abdel Shakour Hanafi	3 June	22	Armed Forces Hospital (Al-Silah Al-Tibi Hospital – Khartoum)	Skull crushed after being run over by pickup truck
21	Khater Hussien Khater	3 June	21	Al-Arbaeen Specialized Hospital	Gunshot
22	Othman Mohammed Qasem al-Said	3 June	20	Armed Forces Hospital (Al-Silah Al-Tibi Hospital – Khartoum)	Gunshot
23	Munzer Yousef al-Amin	3 June	28	Armed Forces Hospital (Al-Silah Al-Tibi Hospital – Khartoum)	Gunshot and crushed skull
24	Abdelwahab al-Said	3 June	54	Mohamed bin Saleh Al Rajhi Charity Hospital	Gunshot
25	Saad Mansour Abdeen	3 June	20	Libya Omdurman	Gunshot
26	Amro Ibrahim	3 June	25	Asia Hospital	Stabbed to death
27	Oday Bashir Noori	3 June	14	Al-Arbaeen Specialized Hospital	Gun
28	Walid Bakheet al-Taib	3 June	35	Armed Forces Hospital (Al-Silah Al-Tibi Hospital – Khartoum)	Gunshot
29	Ibrahim Musa	3 June	51	Armed Forces Hospital (Al-Silah Al-Tibi Hospital – Khartoum)	Body crushed after being run over by pickup truck
30	Othman Ibrahim Hussein	3 June	No data	Bashair Teaching Hospital	No data
31	Mudther Idris Mohammed Zein	3 June	26	Bashair Teaching Hospital	Gunshot
32	Eid Farouq Ahmed	3 June	32	Al Tamayoz Hospital	No data
33	Othman Hasab-Allah Sadiq	3 June	16	Al Injaz Sudanese German Specialized Hospital	No data
34	Mohammed Fathi Ali Ibrahim	3 June	13	Armed Forces Hospital (Al-Silah Al-Tibi Hospital – Khartoum)	No data
35	Unidentified Person	3 June	No data	Omdurman Hospital	No data
36	Unidentified Person	3 June	No data	El Mualim Hospital	No data
37	Unidentified Person	3 June	No data	El Mualim Hospital	No data
38	Unidentified Person	3 June	No data	Omdurman Teaching Hospital Mortuary	Gunshot and body was pulled from the Nile
39	Unidentified Person	3 June	No data	Royal Care International Hospital	No data
40	Unidentified Person	3 June	No data	Royal Care International Hospital	No data
41	Unidentified Person	3 June	No data	Sit-in Field Clinic	No data
42	Ahmed Jaafar Mustafa Khogaly	3 June	No data	Sit-in Field Clinic	No post mortem was done
43	Awad Said Atayia	3 June	No data	Al Droshab	Gunshot and body was pulled from the Nile
44	Mahmoud Ahmed Abdelqayoum	3 June	No data	Sit-in Field Clinic	No post mortem was done
45	Yaser	3 June	No data	Sharg Alneel Hospital	Gunshot
46	Al-Wasileh Nader	3 June	No data	Sharg Alneel Hospital	Gunshot
47	Rana Joun (she was pregnant)	3 June	No data	Royal Care International Hospital	Gunshot
48	Mustafa al-Taj Mohammed Othman	4 June	19	Rabak – block 5	Gunshot
49	Burai Adam Yousef	4 June	19	Rabak – block 10	Gunshot
50	Al-Haj Suleiman	4 June	16	Rabak	Gunshot
51	Moaz Abdullah	4 June	20	Rabak – block 3	Gunshot
52	Ayoub Mohammed Abkar	4 June	20	Rabak – block 21	Gunshot
53	Naji Khandouqy Eissa	4 June	8	Rabak – block 5	Gunshot
54	Mohanad Mohammed Fuad	4 June	14	Hilt Koko	Gunshot
55	Haitham Anwar	4 June	15	Royal Care International Hospital	Gunshot
56	Musaab Said Shagheel	4 June	23	Bashair Teaching Hospital	Gunshot
57	Mohammed Abdel Mahmoud Fadel Al-Mawla Said	4 June	32	Best Care Hospital	Gunshot
58	Ezuddin Mohammed Bushra	4 June	41	Bashair Teaching Hospital	Stabbed to death
59	Sadiq al-Haj Ahmed Abkar	4 June	17	Bashair Teaching Hospital	Stabbed to death
60	Omar Mohammed Hussein Bahar	4 June	23	Al-Bagair	Stabbed to death
61	Al-Amin Ismail Al-Amin	4 June	27	Um bada Hospital	Gunshot
62	Hussam Said Al-Yazal	4 June	40	Best Care Hospital	Gunshot
63	Lawal William Pak	4 June	No data	No data	Gunshot
64	Jaddu Mohammed Barka Hamdan	5 June	22	Best Care Hospital	Stabbed to death
65	Mujahed Jumaa Ramadan	5 June	24	Sharg Alneel Hospital	Stabbed to death
66	Mohammed Al-Sir Khamees Ibrahim	5 June	22	Bashair Teaching Hospital	Stabbed to death
67	Amer Adam Yousef Abdelkarim	5 June	17	Bashair Teaching Hospital	Stabbed to death
68	Jumaa Ismail Ahmed Sharafuddin	5 June	35	Bashair Teaching Hospital	Stabbed to death
69	Mohammed Idris al-Fakki Jaddu	5 June	24	Armed Forces Hospital (Al-Silah Al-Tibi Hospital – Khartoum)	Gunshot
70	Baderuddin Rabei Mohammed Ali	5 June	No data	Omdurman Teaching Hospital	Gunshot and body was pulled from the Nile
71	Unidentified Person	5 June	No data	Omdurman Teaching Hospital	Gunshot
72	Unidentified Person	5 June	No data	Omdurman Teaching Hospital	Gunshot
73	Saber al-Tijani Abdurrahman	5 June	No data	No data	Gunshot
74	Al-Nazeer Abdurrahman	5 June	No data	No data	Gunshot
75	Unidentified Person	5 June	No data	Omdurman Teaching Hospital	Gunshot and body was pulled from the Nile (stone was tied to his leg)
76	Yaser Ali Mohammed Abdullah	5 June	No data	Omdurman Teaching Hospital	Gunshot and body was pulled from the Nile (stone was tied to his leg)
77	Unidentified Person	5 June	No data	No data	Gunshot
78	Mujahed Ezuddin Mohammed Naser	5 June	No data	Al-Shifa Hospital	Gunshot
79	Othman Said Ahmed	5 June	No data	No data	Gunshot
80	Mohammed Al-Mujtaba Abdurrahman Daweina	5 June	No data	No data	Gunshot and body was pulled from the Nile
81	Mustafa Suleiman Abdullah Raoumeh	5 June	No data	Omdurman Teaching Hospital Mortuary	Gunshot
82	Ali Fadel Al-Ati Ali	5 June	No data	Omdurman Teaching Hospital Mortuary	Gunshot
83	Ali Saboun Hassan	5 June	No data	Um bada Hospital	Gunshot
84	Sadiq Ibrahim Othman	5 June	No data	Armed Forces Hospital (Al-Silah Al-Tibi Hospital – Khartoum)	Gunshot
85	Unidentified Person	5 June	No data	Omdurman Teaching Hospital Mortuary	Gunshot and body was pulled from the Nile
86	Mohammed Taj al-Sir Mohammed	6 June	No data	Bashair Teaching Hospital	Stabbed to death
87	Abdel Aziz Said Amin	6 June	No data	Sharg Alneel Hospital	Stabbed to death
88	Ghaboush Mubarak Adam	6 June	No data	Um bada	Gunshot
89	Essam Mohammed Noor (Police officer)	7 June	No data	Um bada – killed inside his house	Stabbed to death
90	Amro Anas Mohammed Al-Safi (Child)	8 June	No data	Omdurman	Gunshot
91	Walid Abdurrahman Salem	8 June	37	Bahri	Gunshot
92	Ayman Ousama	9 June	17	Omdurman Teaching Hospital	Gunshot
93	Jaber-Allah Mohammed Muala	7 June	20	Omdurman Teaching Hospital Mortuary	Stabbed to death
94	Al-Maleeh Mohammed Muala	7 June	18	Omdurman Teaching Hospital Mortuary	Stabbed to death
95	Tajuddin al-Awal Darman	7 June	30	Omdurman Teaching Hospital Mortuary	Stabbed to death
96	Mohammed Suleiman Galfour	7 June	No data	Omdurman Teaching Hospital Mortuary	Gunshot
97	Mohammed Abdullah Mohammed	8 June	21	Omdurman Teaching Hospital Mortuary	Gunshot
98	Ibrahim Saleh Omar	8 June	No data	Omdurman Teaching Hospital Mortuary	Stabbed to death
99	Othman Ibrahim Ishaq al-Qouni	10 June	12	Omdurman Teaching Hospital Mortuary	Hit by Machete
100	Al-Hasan	10 June	No data	Royal Care International Hospital	90% burns – 3 June
101	Samuel Emanuel	10 June	No data	No data	No post mortem was done
102	Zamran Hasan Yousef	10 June	21	Omdurman Teaching Hospital Mortuary	Skull crushed
103	Magdy Adam Babaker	10 June	22	Bashair Teaching Hospital	Gunshot
104	Al-Moez Suleiman	10 June	No data	Royal Care International Hospital	Buttstroke with a rifle on the head

== Responsibility ==
=== Rapid Support Forces ===
The military armed forces of the Transitional Military Council (TMC), including the Rapid Support Forces (RSF) led by Mohamed Hamdan Dagalo ("Hemedti"), the immediate successor organisation to the Janjaweed militia, and others are widely attributed as being responsible for the attack. The Daily Beast attributed responsibility directly to RSF under Hemedti's command, based on videos, testimonies by witnesses and interviews with civilian activists. Three separate enquiries released statements to the media in late July 2019. On 27 July, an Attorney-General enquiry requested by the TMC attributed responsibility to "at least eight high-ranking officers" and stated a death toll of 87 and no rapes. On 30 July, enquiries by the Darfur Bar Association and the National Umma Party attributed responsibility directly to the TMC, confirmed the occurrences of rapes as part of the event, and stated a total death toll of 124 (from 3 to 20 June).

Attorney-General enquiry

On 27 July, Fathelrahman Saeed, the head of a committee appointed by the Attorney-General at the request of the TMC to investigate the massacre, stated that 87 people had been killed, 168 injured, no rapes had occurred and no tents had been burnt. Saeed stated that legal cases for crimes against humanity had been launched against eight unnamed high-ranking security officers. The Sudan Forensic Doctors Union described the result of the enquiry as "poor and defective", and the FFC, the Sudanese Women's Union, the Sudanese Professionals Association and the Democratic Lawyers' Alliance rejected the report. Street protests took place in Khartoum in response to the report.

Darfur Bar Association enquiry

The Darfur Bar Association (DBA) created a Truth and Fact-finding Committee to investigate the massacre, primarily the incidents of rape. On 30 July, the DBA committee stated that eight rape victims were receiving psychological therapy; one in Omdurman had committed suicide as a result of the rape; one rape victim had been forced by social stigma to search for another home for her and her family. The DBA claimed that it had "ample evidence" of responsibility of TMC for the massacre and that the "decision to disband the sit-in" took place at a meeting including all TMC members, the Attorney-General, police chiefs and security directors. The DBA committee argued that the Attorney-General enquiry was neither professional, independent nor impartial.

National Umma Party enquiry

The National Umma Party formed an enquiry committee led by Yousef El Amin. On 30 July, El Amin stated that the sit-in was disbanded by "a large military force wearing RSF uniforms and riot police" and that the massacre had been "premeditated and planned". He stated that 47 victims of the massacre died on 3 June, with a total of 124 dying from 3 to 20 June. He confirmed rapes, throwing of bodies into the Nile, and burning of tents.

=== International influences ===
Iyad el-Baghdadi, a human rights activist who became famous during the Arab Spring, argued that the governments of Saudi Arabia, the United Arab Emirates (UAE) and Egypt supported the carrying out of the massacre. Some of the military vehicles and equipment used in the massacre were manufactured in the UAE. The late May visits by TMC leader al-Burhan to the Egyptian president el-Sisi and to the de facto ruler of the UAE, Mohamed bin Zayed Al Nahyan, and of the TMC deputy leader Dagalo to Mohammad bin Salman, the de facto ruler of Saudi Arabia, were interpreted by el-Baghdadi as encouragements for the TMC to cancel negotiations with the opposition and to carry out a massacre. El-Baghdadi situates this in the general context of Saudi, UAE and Egyptian leaders being afraid of democratic movements. Mahmoud Elmutasim, a political activist and doctor who graduated from the University of Khartoum, stated that Saudi Arabia and the UAE are opposed to the existence of democracies in the Middle East, since if "the idea of democracy itself [should] ever take root, or become widespread in the Middle East," then it would constitute a threat to the governmental systems of Saudi Arabia and the UAE.

The New Arab and Middle East Eye similarly argued that "The blooded assault was launched shortly after top Sudanese generals visited Riyadh, Abu Dhabi and Egypt to secure support for their takeover, with observers arguing the transitional military council received a green light from the three powerful Arab states for their move".

After news of the massacre, Egypt called for restraint and the UAE called for dialogue and an investigation into the massacre. Emirati Minister of Foreign Affairs Anwar Gargash stated "We are concerned about the massacre we've seen. We support calls for proper investigation". Gargash also called for dialogue which he hoped would prevail in Sudan, stating "The regional experience has taught us that the orderly and conservative transition of the state and its institutions is the only way to avoid years of chaos and loss".

=== Transition period official investigation ===
The Political Agreement between the TMC and the Forces for Freedom and Change (FFC) alliance for a Sudanese transition to democracy, which was initially agreed on verbally on 5 July 2019 and signed on 17 July, includes a plan for an independent Sudanese investigation into the 3 June Khartoum massacre "and related incidents of human rights violations committed against civilians or militaries".

According to an anonymous military official present at negotiations for the initial verbal deal, quoted by The Christian Science Monitor, US negotiators led by Donald E. Booth proposed that TMC members be guaranteed immunity from prosecution in the investigation. The military official stated, "The Americans demanded a deal as soon as possible. Their message was clear: power-sharing in return for guarantees that nobody from the council will be tried." In late July, the FFC requested that the constitutional declaration, a document intended to add details complementary to the political agreement, should give no immunity against prosecution to any civilian or military leaders of the transition institutions.

The Draft Constitutional Declaration signed in August 2019 confirmed the creation of an independent investigation, and gave "procedural" immunity to all senior members of the transition institutions, which can be removed by a simple majority vote of the Transitional Legislative Council. On 21 September 2019, the transition period prime minister, Abdalla Hamdok, issued a decision to initiate the official Khartoum massacre investigation with a 7-member committee of lawyers, independent from all other state bodies, to be assigned to carry out the investigation. The members of the men-only commission, headed by human rights lawyer Nabil Adib, were nominated on 20 October. The No to Oppression against Women Initiative objected to the absence of women members on the commission.

=== Other investigations ===
On 5 March 2020, an investigation by Physicians for Human Rights (PHR) stated that Sudanese security forces had planned the attack against pro-democracy stagings in Khartoum. The report said that the 3 June massacre was carried out using techniques by the Sudanese authorities in which they "purposefully pre-positioned" their units and armed them with tear gas and assault rifles before the attack was initiated. PHR stated, "Security forces' horrific tactics – sexual violence, including rape, use of tear gas, whips, batons, and live ammunition – killed and critically injured hundreds of civilians."

== Aftermath ==
On 4 June, the Transitional Military Council (TMC) cancelled all agreements reached during talks with the main opposition alliance on setting up a transitional administration. The sides had agreed on forming a parliament and a government that would prepare for elections after three years. The leaders of the Declaration of Freedom and Change Forces (DFCF) opposition alliance, said an open-ended civil disobedience campaign would continue to try to force the council from power. The leaders also added that there is no room for negotiations," as military leaders attempted to do damage control in the face of international criticism of Monday's indiscriminate killings.

On 5 June, Khartoum was tense with many roads barricaded by protesters, shops shut and streets mostly empty. Rapid Support Forces (RSF) vehicles were patrolling the streets in Omdurman, on the other side of the River Nile from Khartoum and firing into the air.

On 5 June, the United Nations Security Council met on at the request of Britain and Germany to hear a briefing from UN envoy Nicholas Haysom, who has been working with the African Union (AU) on a solution to the crisis in Sudan. But China, backed by Russia, blocked a bid to condemn the killing of civilians and issue an urgent call from world powers for an immediate halt to the violence. The DFCF called on all countries and international organisations to stop dealing with Sudan's Transitional Military Council. They also called on the international community to start looking into "the ongoing violations and crimes committed by (TMC) in all cities and towns and to stop it immediately." As reported by the Central Committee of Sudan Doctors (CCSD), an organisation of medical volunteers, dozens of bodies were pulled from the Nile Wednesday and doctors said they had been weighed down with rocks in an attempt to hide the true death toll.

On 6 June, the African Union Peace and Security Department issued a statement suspending the participation of Sudan in all AU activities with immediate effect – "until the effective establishment of a civilian-led transitional authority," which it described as the only way to "exit from the current crisis".

On 9 June, normally a regular working day in Sudan, protesters launched a civil disobedience campaign aiming at removing the TMC. Four people were shot dead by the TMC forces in Khartoum. As roads were blocked, almost all formal and informal businesses were closed, including, banks, public transport and Khartoum International Airport, where several airlines cancelled their Sudan flights following the massacre and passengers were left waiting outside airport's departures terminal. The general strike was followed by about 60–100% of workers, varying between sectors, for a total of 3 days and was followed on 12 June by an agreement between the TMC and the opposition to free political prisoners, stop the strike, and resume negotiations.

An online social media trend with the hashtag #BlueForSudan started several days after the massacre, representing solidarity for the protest movement, with blue signifying the favorite color of Mohamed Mattar, one of the victims of the massacre.

Two were killed on the second anniversary of the massacre, the killing took place in front of the military headquarter, the Sudanese military issued a statement calling it an "unfortunate event". Sudanese prime minister Abdallah Hamdok said he was shocked by the killings, calling it a "crime to use live bullets against peaceful protesters".

== Reactions ==
The United Nations Secretary-General, António Guterres, condemned the use of excessive force by Sudan's security agents and said he was "alarmed" by reports that forces had opened fire inside a hospital.

On 4 June, Norway, the United Kingdom, and the United States issued a statement on developments in Sudan. "The Troika condemns the violent attacks in Sudan on 3rd June, which resulted in the killing and injuring of many peaceful civilian protesters. By ordering these attacks, the Transitional Military Council has put the transition process and peace in Sudan in jeopardy. We call for an agreed transfer of power to a civilian-led government as demanded by the people of Sudan. We welcome the statement of the Chairperson of the African Union (AU) and support the important role of the AU in solving the crisis in Sudan, including its demand for an immediate handover to a civilian-led government". "The Troika also expresses its serious concern over the TMC’s announcement that it will cease negotiations with the Forces for Freedom and Change, retract all previous agreements with them on formation of an interim government, and will hold elections within nine months. The people of Sudan deserve an orderly transition, led by civilians, that can establish the conditions for free and fair elections, rather than have rushed elections imposed by the TMC’s security forces".

On 3 June, the African Union issued the following statement "The Chairperson of the African Union Commission, Moussa Faki strongly condemns the violence that erupted today which led to reported deaths and several civilian injuries. In this regard, he calls for an immediate and transparent investigation in order to hold those all responsible accountable. The Chairperson calls on the Transitional Military Council to protect the civilians from further harm". "the Chairperson calls on all international partners to reinforce common efforts towards the immediate cessation of the violence and rapid resumption of negotiations for a political settlement.

=== Works by artists and photographers ===
Many Sudanese artists designed and created pieces of art that show the scale of the massacre. Khalid Kodi from Boston College, United States, made a painting that depicts a Sudanese woman in front of the military headquarters, with the woman symbolising the women who were raped by the RSF during the massacre.

In 2021, the French book "Soudan. Année Zero" presented a detailed historical and sociological analysis of the weeks during the Sudanese revolution, that preceded the deadly assault and destruction of the site that protestors had occupied in front of the headquarters of the Armed Forces in central Khartoum. Part of this analysis of the Khartoum massacre are numerous pictures by Sudanese photographers who had documented the uprising until that point in time.

== See also ==
- 2018–19 Sudanese protests
- 2019 Sudanese coup d'état
- Transitional Military Council
- August 2013 Rabaa massacre
