= Nabil Adib =

Sudanese human rights lawyer

Head of Khartoum Massacre Investigation Commission
- Incumbent
- Assumed office 20 October 2019
- Prime Minister: Abdalla Hamdok

Personal details
- Occupation: lawyer
- Known for: legal defence against human rights violations during al-Bashir era

Nabil Adib Abdalla (usually: Nabil Adib) is a Sudanese human rights lawyer who was nominated on 20 October 2019 as head of the investigation commission of the 3 June Khartoum massacre that took place during the Sudanese Revolution.

== Omar al-Bashir era ==
Adib provided legal defence to many people tortured and imprisoned during the 30 years of the Omar al-Bashir presidency of Sudan.

As of May 2016, Adib headed a human rights group called Sudan Human Rights Monitor.

On 5 May 2016, several weeks after students had held protests on the campus of the University of Khartoum to defend their right to create a students' union, National Intelligence and Security Service officers raided Adib's office without an arrest warrant. They assaulted two staff members, confiscated legal files and Adib's laptop, and arrested ten students, two lawyers, and two staff members.

== Sudanese Revolution ==
Around May 2019, Adib described the first four months of the Sudanese Revolution as "really amazing". He stated, "It took four months and, even though the regime confronted it with violence, the young people remained adamant to bring it down".

Adib expressed his confidence that the August 2019 Draft Constitutional Declaration was appropriate for the practical purposes of the planned 39-month transition period to democracy. He insisted that the document does not hold the status of a definitive constitution. He referred to constitutional changes that had been implemented in the October 1964 Revolution and the 1985 Sudanese Revolution.

=== Head of Khartoum investigation ===
On 20 October 2019, Adib was nominated as head of the investigation commission of the 3 June Khartoum massacre that took place during the Sudanese Revolution. The creation of the commission was mandated under Article 7.(16) of the August 2019 Draft Constitutional Declaration, to cover "violations committed on 3 June 2019, and events and incidents where violations of the rights and dignity of civilian and military citizens were committed."

== Points of view ==
Adib attributed discrimination against Christians in Sudan to the political belief, influenced by Arab nationalism, that a nation should have a single identity. He argued that legal discrimination in favour of Islam strengthened successively since the 1950s in Sudan, leading to the 2011 secession of South Sudan. Adib argued that Sudan has a high level of religious diversity and that "there is no other people more tolerant than Sudanese Muslims".
