= Khartoum massacre investigation =

Sudanese investigation into 2019 killings

Khartoum Massacre Investigation Commission
Independent investigation commission overview
- Formed: 21 September 2019
- Jurisdiction: Sudan
- Headquarters: Khartoum, Sudan
- Independent investigation commission executive: Nabil Adib, Head of Commission
- Parent department: Prime Minister's Office

The Khartoum massacre investigation is an official investigation of the 3 June, 2019 Khartoum massacre and other human rights violations of the Sudanese Revolution, mandated under Article 7.(16) of the Sudanese August 2019 Draft Constitutional Declaration, to cover "violations committed on 3 June, 2019, and events and incidents where violations of the rights and dignity of civilian and military citizens were committed." The men-only investigation committee of the massacre, rapes and other human rights violations is headed by human rights lawyer Nabil Adib. The No to Oppression against Women Initiative protested against the men-only composition of the commission.

== Background ==
The Khartoum massacre took place on 3 June, 2019 in the context of the Sudanese Revolution against a protestors' sit-in in Khartoum. The massacre of 118 civilians and the rape of 70 women and men is generally attributed to the Rapid Support Forces (RSF), under the leadership of Mohamed Hamdan Dagalo ("Hemetti"). The rapes were documented as a deliberate campaign to "break the girls" according to France 24.

The results of three different enquiries were released in late July 2019. On 27 July, Fathelrahman Saeed, the head of a committee appointed by the Attorney-General at the request of the Transitional Military Council (TMC) to investigate the massacre, stated that 87 people had been killed, 168 injured, no rapes had occurred and no tents had been burnt. Saeed stated that legal cases for crimes against humanity had been launched against eight unnamed high-ranking security officers. The report was considered "poor and defective" by citizens' groups.

The Darfur Bar Association (DBA) released its own report on 30 July, stating that eight rape victims were receiving psychological therapy; one in Omdurman had committed suicide as a result of the rape; one rape victim had been forced by social stigma to search for another home for her and her family. The DBA claimed that it had "ample evidence" of responsibility of the TMC for the massacre and that the "decision to disband the sit-in" took place at a meeting including all TMC members, the Attorney-General, police chiefs and security directors.

The third report was that of a committee created by the National Umma Party and led by Yousef El Amin. On 30 July, El Amin stated that the sit-in was disbanded by "a large military force wearing RSF uniforms and riot police" and that the massacre had been "premeditated and planned". He stated that 47 victims of the massacre died on 3 June, with a total of 124 dying from 3 to 20 June. He confirmed rapes, throwing of bodies into the Nile, and burning of tents.

== Legal constraints ==
The 4 August Draft Constitutional Declaration refers to the investigation in Article 7.(16) as an element of the "Mandate of the Transitional Period," defining the scope as "violations committed on 3 June, 2019, and events and incidents where violations of the rights and dignity of civilian and military citizens were committed." The investigation committee is to be created under an "order" that "guarantees that it will be independent and possess full powers to investigate and determine the timeframe for its activities".

Article 21 of the Draft Constitutional Declaration gives "procedural" immunity to members of the Sovereignty Council, the Cabinet, the Transitional Legislative Council, governors of provinces and heads of regions, with Article 21.(2) giving the Transitional Legislative Council the right to lift that immunity by a simple majority.

== Commission ==
On 21 September, 2019, Prime Minister Abdalla Hamdok issued a decision to create the primary investigation commission of seven lawyers, including a Supreme Court judge, representatives of the Ministries of Justice, Defence and Interior, a "national figure" and two independent lawyers. The decision guaranteed that the committee would operate independently of any other governmental, judicial or legal body. The commission will be required to release a report with its findings within three months and can extend its mandate for another three months.

Hamdok named the members of the commission on 20 October, with Nabil Adib as the head of the commission. The other commission members are Osman Mohamed Osman as rapporteur, Sohaib Abdullatif as deputy rapporteur, colonel Ismat Abdalla Mohamed Taha and Ahmed El Taher El Nur and two unnamed members.

=== Men-only commission ===
Ihsan Fagiri of the No to Oppression against Women Initiative protested on 22 October 2019 against the men-only nature of the commission. She stated that women should participate as commission members, since many women had been killed, raped or thrown dead into the Nile and three women rape victims had committed suicide after the massacre.

== Investigation ==
In December 2019, the commission started collecting documents, photographic and audiovisual evidence and invited witnesses to contact the commission via a secure website. By December 2020, the commission had received 150 video recordings of the event and had collected testimonies from 3000 witnesses. In December 2020, the commission started questioning military members of the Sovereignty Council. Yasser al-Atta, a military member of the Sovereignty Council, was questioned for two hours by the Commission on 21 December 2020. Shams al-Din Khabbashi, another Sovereignty Council military member, was expected to be questioned.

On 4 May 2021, Nabil Adib, the head of the commission, commented to Newlines Magazine that "the result could lead to a coup d'état or to mass unrest in the streets.

== Trials ==
Chief Justice Nemat Abdullah Khair stated in late December 2020 that trials for the killings of Ahmed el-Kheir, Hanafi Abdelshakour and Ashraf el-Tayeb, three protestors who were killed during events of the Sudanese Revolution other than the 3 June massacre itself, were ongoing by a "special court constellation". The case for Ahmed el-Kheir resulted in the sentencing to death of 29 National Intelligence and Security Service officers, with a final appeal step still pending in the Supreme Court as of December 2020.

== Missing persons committee ==
On 23 September 2019, the Attorney-General Abdallah Ahmed Abdallah created a committee of prosecutors and "representatives of the Bar Association, the police, the Human Rights Department of the Ministry of Justice, and the Unit to combat violence against women" to investigate the disappearances of the people who remained missing after the Khartoum massacre and provide a report within two months. On 14 September, the citizens' group "Missing" listed 21 people missing.
