= Blackout Tuesday =

June 2, 2020, protest against racism and police brutality

A solid black square, used by many to represent Blackout Tuesday

Blackout Tuesday was a collective action to protest racism and police brutality. The action, originally organized within the music industry in response to the murder of George Floyd, the murder of Ahmaud Arbery, and the killing of Breonna Taylor, took place on Tuesday, June 2, 2020. Businesses taking part were encouraged to abstain from releasing music and other business operations. Some outlets produced blacked out, silent, or minimal programming for 8 minutes and 46 seconds, the originally reported length of time that police officer Derek Chauvin compressed Floyd's neck.

== Background ==
Blackout Tuesday stemmed off of the original initiative created by music executives Brianna Agyemang and Jamila Thomas, Senior Director of Marketing at Atlantic Records. Agyemang and Thomas have since noted that "These injustices we are facing in America are not limited to just our community. This is a global initiative and our efforts will include members worldwide".

Businesses participated in different ways. Black Americans were asked to not buy or sell on this day to show economic strength and unity. Spotify announced it would be adding an 8-minute and 46-second moment of silence to certain podcasts and playlists for the day. In remembrance of George Floyd, media conglomerate Paramount Global similarly took all of its cable channels, which include MTV, Nickelodeon, and Comedy Central, off the air for 8 minutes and 46 seconds. Apple Music stripped down and took over the "Browse", "For You", and "Radio" tabs and replaced them with a single radio streaming station in celebration of Black music.

On Facebook and Instagram, users participated by posting a single photo of a black square alongside the hashtag #blackouttuesday.

== Actions promoted ==
Organizations supporting Blackout Tuesday suggested that the day could be an opportunity for reflection on racism and the effects of racism on society. Others suggested it could be an opportunity to take time from work to focus on helping others. According to the original statement released by Aygyemang and Thomas, "This is not just a 24-hour initiative. We are and will be in this fight for the long haul. A plan of action will be announced". This is only phase one of a multi-phase movement. It was also proposed that this day be used as “a day to disconnect from work and reconnect with our community” via “an urgent step of action to provoke accountability and change.” "Blackout Tuesday" was originally conceived as a music-industry protest, according to Rolling Stone, and Jamila Thomas and Brianna Agyemang of Atlantic Records meant it to be a call for the industry to "not conduct business as usual." In a statement, Thomas wrote, "Your black executives, artists, managers, staff, colleagues are drained, traumatized, hurt, scared, and angry," adding, "I don't want to sit on your Zoom calls talking about the black artists who are making you so much money, if you fail to address what's happening to black people right now." In a separate statement, the pair wrote that "the show can't just go on, as our people are being hunted and killed."

== Concerns and criticisms ==
Some users posted the black square image using the hashtag #blackouttuesday, #blacklivesmatter or #BLM (an abbreviation of the latter), which in turn led users who were searching for or tracking those hashtags to find nothing but solid black images. Some activists were concerned because the Black Lives Matter related hashtags were being used by activists and others to share information during the ongoing protests, and posting a black square with the incorrect hashtag risked drowning out critical information and updates. Other users pointed to those participating in the Blackout Tuesday event, but not involving themselves in other forms of activism, such as protesting or donating, as being performative in their activism. There was also a hoax spreading around claiming that the event was started by 4chan trolls, but research has shown that to be false.

Blackout Tuesday was criticized as a form of virtue signalling for the initiative's "lack of clarity and direction".

== See also ==
- BlueforSudan
