= Sara Ibrahim Abdelgalil =

Sudanese doctor and activist

- Citizenship: Sudanese
- Education: University of Khartoum
- Occupations: Physician and human rights activist

Sara Ibrahim Abdelgalil (Arabic: سارة إبراهيم عبد الجليل) is a Sudanese UK-based doctor and democracy advocate involved in Sudanese diaspora initiatives. A member of Sudan’s Doctors for Human Rights, she emphasises child protection, and actively contributed during the 2018–2019 Sudanese protests and against the 2021 military coup as a spokesperson for the Sudanese Professionals Association.

== Early life and education ==
Sara Ibrahim Abdelgalil was born to Ibrahim Hassan Abdelgalil, a professor of economy at the University of Khartoum and a member of the Democratic Unionist Party who died on 14 October 2018. She graduated with Bachelor of Medicine, Bachelor of Surgery from the University of Khartoum in 1998.

== Medical career ==
Sara (Note: Sara Ibrahim Abdelgalil is from a culture that does not use last names.) moved to the United Kingdom in 2001, and completed a Masters in Tropical Paediatrics and Child Health, Liverpool School of Tropical Medicine in 2002. She is a Fellow of the Royal College of Paediatrics and Child Health. She is an paediatric consultant at NHS England since 2003 at the Norfolk and Norwich University Hospital, associate professor at the St. George's University since 2015, and emergency humanitarian assistance expert, planning to leverage her experience for global positive impact on vulnerable populations and children. She is recognised as a diaspora engagement expert by the European Union Diaspora Forum.

== Activism ==
Sara is a member of Sudan’s Doctors for Human Rights, and focuses on child protection in the challenging Sudanese context. Sara was the president of the Sudan Doctors Union (UK branch) between 2017 and 2020, and the spokesperson for the Sudanese Professionals Association, trade union federation that took a prominent role in the 2018–2019 Sudanese protests against the government of Omar al-Bashir during 2019. During the protests, she emphasised to Al Jazeera that "people on the streets are protesting just because of fuel and bread. They are protesting because there is an overall failure of the whole system,"

Before the 2023 Sudan war, she played a role in mobilising support against the 25 October 2021 military coup and state violence on peaceful protesters. During the war, Sara stated that "Doctors won't take sides in any armed conflict; they are working hard to save lives."

She services as a consultant for the Shabaka social enterprise, and contributes to mapping the Sudanese diaspora for humanitarian aid and establishing a crisis coordination unit. Co-founder of Governance Programming Overseas, an NGO in Sudan, Sara educates youth on governance principles for democracy and human rights.
