= Sudanese Professionals Association =

Sudanese trade union federation

Sudanese Professionals' Association
- تجمع المهنيين السودانيين
- Founded: August 2016
- Type: Trade Union Association
- Purpose: living wage, improved working conditions
- Location: Sudan
- Origins: lecturers' union, doctors' union, teachers' committee
- Region served: Sudan
- Method: nonviolent resistance
- Key people: Mohamed Yousif; Ahmed al-Mustafa; Mohamed Nagi Alassam; Sara Abdelgalil
- Subsidiaries: Teachers' Committee; Central Committee of Sudanese Doctors; Democratic Lawyers Association (17 altogether as of 2018)
- Website: sudaneseprofessionals.org

The Sudanese Professionals' Association (SPA; Arabic: تجمع المهنيين السودانيين) is an umbrella association of 17 different Sudanese trade unions. The organisation started forming in October 2012, though was not officially registered due to government crackdowns on trade unions, and was created more formally in October 2016 by an alliance between unions of doctors, journalists and lawyers. In December 2018, the group called for the introduction of a minimum wage and participated in protests in Atbara against the rising cost of living. The SPA came to take an increasingly prominent role in the 2018–2019 Sudanese protests against the government of Omar al-Bashir during 2019. The organisation is also a member of the Progressive International.

== Origin ==
In 2012, a university lecturers' union in Sudan, in which Mohamed Yousif Ahmed al-Mustafa was active, judged that it was not strong enough to be effective. The lecturers' union joined with a doctors' union and a committee of teachers. In 2014, the groups had chosen the name Sudanese Professionals Association and started planning campaigns for a living wage and improved working conditions. In October 2016, a formal alliance between the Central Committee of Sudanese Doctors, the Sudanese Journalists Network, and the Democratic Lawyers Association was created on the basis of a written charter.

== 2018–19 Sudanese protests ==
After the 19 December 2018 Atbara protests started during the 2018–19 Sudanese protests, the SPA initially decided to coordinate with the protestors, by adding a call for an increased minimum wage. After discussing with the protestors, they decided to support the calls for "regime change".

Following the 3 June 2019 Khartoum massacre, the SPA called for "complete civil disobedience and open political strike" on the grounds that the Transitional Military Council (TMC) was responsible for two days of mass murder, pillage, rape and violent repression of workers' strikes. The SPA described the TMC members as "deep to their knees in the blood of the innocent in Darfur, Nuba Mountains and Blue Nile, in addition to Khartoum and other cities and towns." The SPA called for the Sudanese to follow the method of nonviolent resistance "in all [their] direct actions, towards change".

In August 2019, the SPA announced that it would not take part in the cabinet of the transitional government but would instead participate in the Legislative Council in order to oversee the transition to democracy.

SPA member Mohammed Hassan Osman al-Ta'ishi (or Mohamed El Taayshi) became one of the eleven members of the Sovereignty Council, the collective head of state of Sudan for a planned 39-month transitional period, on 20 August 2019.

On 3 July 2020 it was announced that five affiliated organisations, the Central Committee of Sudan Doctors (CCSD), the Sudanese Engineers Association (SEA), the Sudanese Human Resources Professionals Gathering (SHRPG), the Meteorological Professionals Gathering and the Sudanese Environmentalists Association, were suspended following internal conflict within the organisation.

== Members ==
The following groups are backers of or are officially under the umbrella of the SPA, as of June 2019:

- Teachers’ Committee
- Central Committee of Sudanese Doctors
- Democratic Lawyers Association
- Sudanese Journalists Network
- Association of Democratic Veterinarians
- University Professors Association
- Sudanese Doctors Syndicate
- Sudanese Engineers Syndicate
- Central Pharmacists Committee
- Sudanese Engineers Association
- Sudanese Plastic Artists Association
- Association of Animal Production Specialists
- Health Officers Association
- Central Committee of Medical Laboratories
- Professional Pharmacists Assembly
- Association of Professional Accountants
- Association of Agricultural Engineers
