= Darfur Bar Association =

Sudanese lawyers organisation

- هيئة محامي دارفور
- Founded: 1995
- Purpose: human rights, peace negotiations to end the War in Darfur
- Location: Sudan
- Region served: Sudan
- Method: legal assistance, advocacy, capacity building, mediation
- Members: 535 (Nov 2017)
- Website: darfurbarassociation.org

The Darfur Bar Association (DBA, Arabic: هيئة محامي دارفور, romanized: Hayʼat Muḥāmī Dārfūr) is a Sudanese lawyers' organisation created in 1995. In 2020, the group received the Democracy Award for supporting marginalized people in advocating for their rights and providing legal assistance to vulnerable activists before and during protests in Sudan.

== Origin ==
The Darfur Bar Association was created in 1995 and as of 2017, aims at providing legal support in relation to human rights violations in Darfur and the rest of Sudan. As of November 2017, it had a membership of 535 lawyers.

== 2013 Darfur student arrests ==
In August 2018, during the 30-year rule of Omar al-Bashir, the Darfur Bar Association stated the security services deliberately prosecuted students and held them under detention for long periods of time in order to discourage them from human rights related activities. According to the DBA, the security services arbitrarily detained students, and after students had been tortured while in detention and been found "not guilty" in court, again arbitrarily re-arrested them. The DBA gave the example of five students of Sudan University, Alnilin University and Omdurman Ahlia University who were tortured using electric batons, tapes, racist insults, and were blindfolded for two days, and underwent the re-arrest procedure in June and July 2013. The five students were again found not guilty on 18 August 2013 by a Central Khartoum criminal court judge, Osama Ahmed Abdalla. The DBA promised to take "appropriate and necessary measures" to obtain justice for the students.

== 2018–19 Sudanese protests ==
Following the 3 June 2019 Khartoum massacre that occurred during the 2018–19 Sudanese protests, the Darfur Bar Association created a Truth and Fact-finding Committee to investigate the massacre, primarily the incidents of rape. On 30 July, the DBA committee stated that eight rape victims were receiving psychological therapy; one in Omdurman had committed suicide as a result of the rape; one rape victim had been forced by social stigma to search for another home for her and her family. The DBA claimed that it had "ample evidence" of responsibility of the Transitional Military Council (TMC), the junta ruling Sudan at the time, for the massacre and that the "decision to disband the sit-in" took place at a meeting including all TMC members, the Attorney-General, police chiefs and security directors. The DBA committee argued that the Attorney-General enquiry was neither professional, independent nor impartial.

== 2019 Darfur peace negotiations ==
In early September 2019, the Darfur Bar Association started organising negotiations between Darfur armed movements, including the Sudan Liberation Movement/Army and the Justice and Equality Movement, and civilian citizens' associations, in the form of a Consultative Forum. The DBA requested that at least a quarter of the delegates to the Consultative Forum be women.
