= Maryam Faghihimani =

Iranian researcher and activist

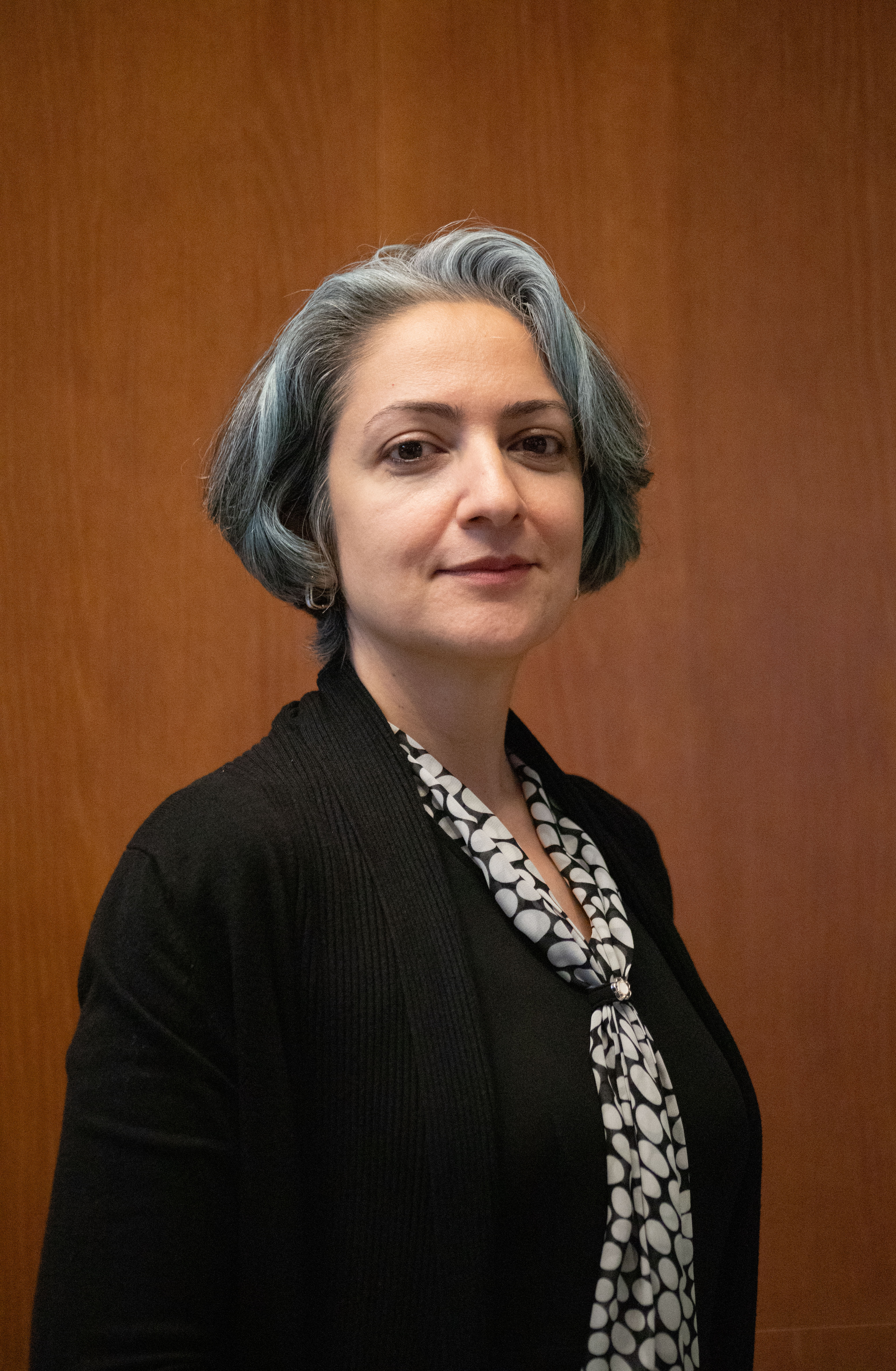
- Education: Azad University, University of Oslo, University of Tampere, Universidade de Aveiro, Leuphana Universität Lüneburg
- Occupations: Researcher, activist, writer
- Organization(s): Centre for Cultural Diplomacy and Development

Maryam Faghihimani (sometimes written as Faghih Imani) is an Iranian researcher and activist, living in Norway and is the founder and President of the Centre for Cultural Diplomacy & Development (CCDD). She believes economic cooperation is the best way to promote peace in the "seemingly insuperable" Arab-Israeli conflict. The daughter of Sayed Kamal Faghih Imani, a leading Iranian ayatollah who holds a strong anti-Israeli perspective, she has labored to promote understanding and acceptance between Muslims and Jews as well as building friendship dialogues between Iranians, Israelis and Arabs .

== Early years ==
She was born on July 7, 1977, in Isfahan. Her grandparents are people of Bakhtiari and Qajar descent. Her father, Sayed Kamal Faghih Imani, is a senior ayatollah in Iran and was a devoted follower of Ayatollah Khomeini, in whose house Maryam was brought up, playing as a child with the children of other ayatollahs. She was educated in a religious school that taught her to hate Israel and that erased the Holocaust from history books. She was the youngest daughter of nine children and was “a rebellious child” who read forbidden books and “asked questions that angered her father.” Although her right to higher education was not supported by her father due to her gender, she persisted in asking to continue her education and was eventually permitted to attend college unlike her other four sisters, in spite of not being married.

“On TV,” she later recalled, “we couldn't watch all sorts of movies but the series we were allowed to watch were censored. There was no mention of Jewish people. The state translated and edited stuff and so oftentimes we didn't know that a movie about the war in Europe was about Jewish people going through the Holocaust. And when it comes to case of Israel, everything was very hostile. All we learned was made up news and the main message was that Israel is the bad guy.”

By age 16, she had begun to be more skeptical and soon did not share her parents' or rulers' ideology. Some years later on a trip to Lebanon she met Hezbollah fighters who, despite a ceasefire, launched rockets at Shebaa farms, only to deny they had done so on Arab media. Noticing “that the Hezbollah fighters she met —Lebanese Arabs— were speaking Persian so fluently,” she realized they had likely received military training from the revolutionary guards in Tehran, even though when confronted with this conclusion they “would say that it wasn't true and that Israel had made all of this up.” She thereupon realized she had been lied to about Israel, and in 2003, she left Iran without her father's consent to work and study in Kuala Lumpur. Her family did not support this decision and she stopped communicating with them for some time. Her father's aim was to pressure her to return home. However Maryam decided to continue her higher education and built a career in Europe.

== Education ==
She studied at Isfahan Azad University from 1998 to 2001, earning a bachelor's degree in Educational Management and Planning. From 2004 to 2007, she studied at Universiti Putra Malaysia, in Instructional Technology and Design. From 2008 to 2012, she studied at the University of Oslo and obtained Sustainability and Higher Education European Masters degree.

Under a European Commission program, she has also studied at the University of Tampere, Universidade de Aveiro, and the Leuphana Universität Lüneburg. Meanwhile, she became interested in the Cultural diplomacy field and started taking courses at the Institute for Cultural Diplomacy in Berlin. Later on, she combined the two fields of Cultural diplomacy and Sustainable development and established her organization called CCDD in Norway.

While studying and researching in Malaysia, Norway, Finland, Portugal, Germany, and elsewhere, she befriended many Jewish people.

== Career ==
She was a Sustainability Adviser at the University of Oslo from 2010 to 2014, and, from 2010 to 2012, was a member of the working group of the RESCUE Foresight Research Project of the European Science Foundation in Brussels. She briefly worked in 2011 as Academic Coordinator at Directorate Office for the Ideas Festival for Climate Change at the University of Oslo. From 2011 to 2014, she was also a Core Group Member of the Institutional Network of the Universities from the Capitals of Europe, UNICA in Brussels for UGAF project, and from 2012 to 2014, a Core Group Member of the Nordic Sustainable Campus Network in Finland.

From August 2013 to August 2014, she was Head of Green UiO at the University of Oslo. She also worked at the University Educators for Sustainable Development at the University of Oslo and University of Gloucestershire. In 2013, she founded the Centre for Cultural Diplomacy & Development (CCDD), of which she is president and in 2014 officially registered the centre in Norway.

=== Centre for Cultural Diplomacy and Development (CCDD) ===
The CCDD was founded to provide a platform of Cultural diplomacy to exchange ideas, information, art and business among nations and their peoples to enhance and improve relations. The centre “promotes democracy and tolerance, and provides an entrepreneurship platform for youth and women in the Middle East.” Faghihimani told The Tablet that “We have to walk the talk....We have to work together, and that makes our peace movement grow in a sustainable way. Otherwise it will remain empty talk. We need to move ahead and build a future instead of looking into the black holes of pasts.”

In her keynote speech at the Economic Prosperity for Peace conference in April 2015 at Harvard Business School, she explained some of the motivations behind establishing CCDD. She explained that “ From those challenging years [in Iran], I have learned a few lessons which I consider them valuable and they have become the overarching principles in our center for cultural diplomacy and development. The first lesson is to stand for the values and not with the governments. I am not a pro Israeli, nor a pro Palestinian or pro Iranian regime but a pro democracy, a pro freedom and a pro peace. we stand with any country which appreciates, respects and practices these values. We also should stand with the people of countries in which their governments do not respect democracy and do not fulfill the rights of citizens. Because standing only with those who have democracy, does not help us to make a better world.” She described the Middle East as the land of opportunities if people would learn to be more tolerant and show willingness to have constructive dialogues. She addressed that “ If we in the Middle East, instead of dragging on the conflicts and intolerance, would learn to appreciate the differences, we would have the most creative and innovative region in the world. Middle East is the land of differences and we have to learn how to seize this opportunity and make the best out of it. It starts with building a purposeful dialogue, to understand the other sides' fear and concern, negotiate, compromise and land on a decision which provides a platform to build a future for all.” She explained that CCDD considers business among other tools, as a strong cultural diplomacy instrument that can initiate a meaningful dialogue among people, build a strong and beneficial bridge between nations which can increase prosperity to ease the tension of the long and destructive conflicts.

=== Other activities ===
She is also the CEO of Green Innovative Solutions. On a volunteer basis, she organizes networking events for the Oslo International Club, an expatriate organization. She joined the board of the Professional Women's Network in Norway in 2015.

In the summer of 2012, she attended the California Higher Education Sustainability Conference at the University of California, Davis. She discovered that “Sustainability teams in Californian universities – and maybe American universities in general – are doing a great job at branding their university as sustainable." Also, “they have built a good bridge between universities and communities for sustainability projects.” She professed to be “amazed...how universities on their own initiatives take responsibility for reducing their impacts and contribute to create a sustainable society. One contrast between these universities and some of the Nordic universities – which I have studied the sustainability affairs of – is that the universities in California have not waited for the government to come up with a set of criteria, law and regulation for sustainability in universities.” By contrast, at Nordic universities, “it is common to hear in some of [the] meetings, seminars and workshops that they long for government to request particular actions from them, introduce regulations and of course allocate specific budgets to work on sustainability.”

Faghihimani played a role at An Enemy of the People, a play by Norwegian playwright Henrik Ibsen. She performed at the opening of Ibsen International Festival in the National Theatre (Oslo) in August 2012. Faghihimani is passionate about classical music, art and literature. When She was in Iran, she used to spend most of after school time at her father's public library, reading literature, history and philosophical books.

In 2014, she was invited to the National Prayer Breakfast as a part of young leaders delegation in Washington DC.

In 2016, Faghihimani became one of the presenters on the show Samte No on Manoto TV, a Persian-language satellite channel. The show tackles controversial subjects usually off limits on Iranian television, which has resulted in her being criticised for “promoting women’s rights” by Iranian pro-government media.

=== Publications ===
One of her publications is “A systemic Approach for Measuring Environmental Sustainability at Higher Education Institutions, A case study of Oslo University”. She is co-author of “You say you want a revolution? Transforming education and capacity building in response to global change,” published in Environmental Science & Policy in April 2013. Based on her action research at the sustainability office of Oslo University she wrote “Translating the Global Script of the Sustainable University: The Case of the University of Oslo,” published by Springer/ Higher Education in A Sustainable Society in April 2015 together with 2 other co-authors.
