= Therese Jebsen =

Norwegian human-rights activist

Therese Jebsen is a Norwegian human-rights activist who is a senior advisor at the Rafto Foundation in Bergen, Norway. She was formerly the executive director of that organization.

== Early life and education ==
Jebsen was educated at the Norwegian School of Economics.

She was Executive Director of the Rafto Human Rights House from 1997 to 2007 and of the Rafto Foundation from 2008 to 2014. She has since been a senior advisor at the foundation.

== Arrest in Vietnam ==
In March 2007, Jebsen was arrested by Vietnamese police when she went to visit Buddhist monk Thich Quang Do in Ho Chi Minh City to present him with the Rafto Prize he had won the previous year. The monk, who was second in command of the Buddhist faith in Vietnam, who was under house arrest in the monastery where he resides, had been prohibited from traveling to Norway to accept the honor. Also arrested with Jebsen were Norwegian-Vietnamese human-rights activist Kieu Tran and two TV2 reporters. The police told Jebsen that it was a crime to visit someone who was involved in illegal activity.

Jebsen and her compatriots were released after two hours of interrogation. After her arrest, Thich Quang Do stated, “I call upon people from around the world, especially those who are investing or giving development aid to Vietnam, to draw lessons from today’s events. Instead of helping to strengthen the communist regime and prolong its survival, try to use your economic aid to save 80 million Vietnamese, and liberate them from the great prison in which they languish today.”

In an interview, the monk recounted that he had been informed shortly beforehand of Jebsen's visit, and upon her arrival at the monastery he had approached her with a bouquet of flowers. Before he could present them to her, however, “a group of Security Police burst in. One was wearing a police uniform, the others wore plain clothes. They intercepted us and ordered Therese Jebsen to go with them to the police station.” The monk tried to explain to the police that Jebsen was a foreign guest on a friendly visit and implored the police to show her some hospitality. “But the police were adamant,” he said. They said they would detain her for only 15 minutes and then allow her to return. “But deep down,” said the monk, “I didn’t believe a word. Communists never do what they say, they never keep their promises.”

Thich Quang Do added, “I am sad and ashamed for my country. There is not a modicum of humanity, courtesy, or civilization left under this regime. The Communists are a bunch of hooligans....That is why democracy and freedom are absolutely vital. They are the medicine that we need to save our lives.”

== Award to Kim Dae-jung ==
South Korean president Kim Dae-jung was chosen to win the 2000 Rafto Award for his work on behalf of North Korens, even though it was widely felt that Dae-jung was far less deserving than activist Benjamin Yoon. It has been claimed that the choice was the result of external pressure by individuals who also managed to persuade the Nobel Peace Prize committee to honor Dae-jung only weeks later. Jebsen has admitted that the Rafto Foundation's actions in this matter were “controversial.”

== Uighur cases ==
When it was reported in 2010 that Alim Abdiriyim, the son of Rafto Prize winner Rabiya Kadeer, was being tortured in a Chinese prison, Jebsen announced: “We have to tell the world that this is happening.... Thousands of Uighurs are sitting in prison, subjected to torture, or risking capital punishment.” In 2005, when Kadeer had been sent into exile in the U.S., she had been warned by Chinese authorities that revenge would be taken on her family if she continued to speak out about the mistreatment of Uighurs by the Beijing government.

In 2014 the Rafto Foundation called for the immediate release of Uighur scholar Ilham Tohti, who had been taken into custody by Beijing police. “The Rafto Foundation is condemning the detention of Professor Tohti and urge China to reveal his whereabouts, treat him humanely and ultimately release him from custody,” said Jebsen.

== Haakon and Azerbaijan ==
When it was announced that Norwegian Crown Prince Haakon planned to visit Azerbaijan in June 2011 to attend an oil conference, Jebsen joined counterparts at the Human Rights House Foundation and the Helsinki Committee in writing a letter to Haakon to urge that he cancel his trip, which they saw as “an unfortunate signal...to provide undeserved recognition to the regime of President Aliyev.”

== Dubai rape case ==
After Norwegian citizen Marte Deborah Dalelv was raped in Dubai in 2013, she reported the crime and ended up with a prison sentence of one year and four months. After being subjected to massive international media coverage and pressure from the Norwegian Foreign Ministry, Dubai flew her home. In advance of her return to Norway, Jebsen urged that Norway continue to pressure Dubai. “The fact that she was pardoned means that somebody has been generous and forgiven her, as if there is something to forgive. This is totally earth-shattering,” Jebsen told TV2 News. She also reacted to the fact that Norwegian prime minister Jens Stoltenberg had thanked the emir of Dubai, who is also prime minister of the United Arab Emirates, for releasing Dalelv. Jebsen called this “deeply problematic,” given that the emir “represents a regime that violates women's rights in a rough and brutal way.” She said that the problem with Dubai and similar regimes remained, and that this episode had been a “wake-up call,” a reminder of the need to fight for women's rights in areas governed under sharia law.

== Personal life ==
She is married to Arne Liljedahl Lynngård, who was also an official at the Rafto Foundation for several years.
