= Mohamed Nagi Alassam =

Sudanese activist and doctor (1991-)

- محمد ناجي الأصم
- Born: 1991 (age 34–35); Jeddah, Saudi Arabia
- Education: Kordofan University
- Occupation: Physician
- Organization(s): SPA; FFC
- Known for: Sudanese Revolution
- Political party: Democratic Unionist Party (Sudan)
- Movement: SPA

Mohamed Nagi Alassam (Arabic: محمد ناجي الأصم) is a Sudanese pro-democracy activist and physician who helped in organising the longest physicians' strike in history during the Sudanese revolution, which lasted until Omar Al-Bashir's government was overthrown. Alassam also took on the role of spokesperson and executive committee member for the Sudanese Professionals Association (SPA), which was crucial in organising and rallying the Sudanese people for a nonviolent revolution. He was the first SPA member to come out publicly, and he was arrested on January 4, 2019, days after start of the revolution.

After being held for 98 days by the General Intelligence Service (Sudan), he was freed after the overthrown of Omar al-Bashir. Following his release, he represented the SPA in the civilian-military negotiations that resulted in the interim constitution that established the foundation for a power-sharing arrangement, i.e., Forces of Freedom and Change. He has been a vocal critic of the Oct. 25 military takeover, and was again arrested after the coup for two weeks.

In 2020 he gave a speech at the virtual Oslo Freedom Forum, where he detailed the chronicles of the 2018 Sudan revolution, and asked the global audience to support the country democratic transition.

In 2021, Alassam co-founded Beam reports an independent Sudanese media platform that aimed to provide factual, reliable, trustworthy, explanatory news, to actively participate in their community and counter misinformation/disinformation and increase media literacy. By producing and disseminating explanatory reports that helps break down current political, economical and social Sudanese issues.

Since the beginning of 2022, Alassam has also been working as a non resident fellow with Arab Reform Initiative with focus on trade unions activity in the region and the democratic transition challenges in Sudan. He published two papers with the initiative, one on the experience of the Sudanese Professional Association, and the other on the April conflict in Sudan.
