= Manoharan =

Manoharan is a surname. Notable people with the surname include:

- K. Manoharan, Indian politician
- Kiru Manoharan, one time ASB Tennis Centre Court player
- M. Manoharan (born 1961), Malaysian lawyer
- Nanjil K. Manoharan (1929–2000), Indian politician
- R. Manoharan, Indian politician
- T. N. Manoharan (1956–2025), Indian accountant
- Vincent Manoharan, Indian activist
- Vinoop Manoharan (born 1992), Indian cricketer
