= Manohari, Aurangabad district =

Manohari
- village
- Country: India
- State: Bihar
- District: Aurangabad

Population (2011)
  - Total: 1,091

Languages
  - Official: Hindi
- Time zone: UTC+5:30 (IST)

Manohari is a village in Aurangabad district in the Indian state of Bihar.
