= Manohar =

Manohar is an Indian surname and given name. Notable people with the name include:

== Given name ==
- Manohar Ajgaonkar, Indian politician
- Manohar Das, 17th century Indian Hindu painter
- Manohar Joshi, politician
- Manohar Lal Chibber, soldier
- Manohar Lal Khattar, politician
- Manohar Malgonkar, author
- Manohar Parrikar, politician
- Manohar Shankar Oak, poet
- Murli Manohar Joshi, politician

== Surname ==
- Prathima Manohar, social entrepreneur
- Prem Manohar, politician
- Ram Manohar Lohia, Indian independence activist
- Sanjeev Manohar, American politician
- Shashank Manohar, Indian cricket administrator
- Sujata Manohar, judge
- Sunanda Murali Manohar, film producer
- V. Manohar, music director, lyricist, film director and actor

Film actors

- Ceylon Manohar
- Crane Manohar
- Lollu Sabha Manohar
- R. N. R. Manohar
- R. S. Manohar
- Suruli Manohar

== See also ==
- Manoharam (disambiguation)
- Manohara, Buddhist folklore
- Manohara Odelia Pinot, Indonesian model and socialite
