= Andrew Stroehlein =

Journalist and human-rights activist

Andrew Stroehlein M.Phil
- Education: Cornell University; Masaryk University; University of Glasgow
- Occupation: European Media Director Human Rights Watch
- Known for: Journalism, human rights activism

Andrew Stroehlein is an American/Belgian/British journalist, communications professional, and human-rights activist who currently serves as European media director of Human Rights Watch. Based in Brussels, he is responsible for the organization's media activity in Europe, Central Asia, and West Africa. He previously spent nine years as director of communications for the International Crisis Group.

== Early life and education ==
Stroehlein attended Cornell University from 1986 to 1989 and earned a BS in biology. He attended Masaryk University in Brno in the Czech Republic in 1995 and 1996, receiving a certificate in Czech. In 1996 and 1997 he attended the University of Glasgow, earning an M.Phil. in post-communist Central Europe.

== Career ==
He was founder of the Central Europe Review, serving as its editor-in-chief from April 1999 to July 2001.

From August 2001 to August 2003, he served as training co-ordinator at the Institute for War and Peace Reporting. He established IWPR's journalism training program, educating over 1500 journalists in 23 countries, hired and managed trainers for aspiring journalists in Europe and Asia, and coordinated with other NGOs.

He was director of communications for the International Crisis Group from September 2003 to February 2013. Based in Brussels, he directed a media operation active in over 60 countries.

Since March 2013, he has served as European media director for Human Rights Watch, based in Brussels.

=== Honors and awards ===
During his tenure at the Central Europe Review, he was selected in 2000 as a finalist for the Online News Association's award for General Excellence in Online Journalism, Original to the Web. Also, he won the NetMedia 2000 Award for Outstanding Contribution to Online Journalism in Europe.

While at the International Crisis Group, he was included on Foreign Policy magazine's 2011 "Twitterati 100" list, the "who's who of the foreign-policy Twitterverse."

In 2017, Spanish foreign policy magazine Esglobal named him one of the 20 most influential experts on Twitter. In the same year, he was named one of the "top 40 EU digital influencers" by Euractiv and ZN Consulting, and again in 2018. In 2019, in addition to being named a top-40 "EU Influencer", he was the top influencer in the "migration and human rights" category, and in 2020, he won that category once more and was the number one "EU Influencer" in the "EU Politics" category. He was the top "EU Influencer" overall in 2022.

On Twitter he is followed by former president of the United States, Barack Obama.

=== Publications ===
Stroehlein writes Human Rights Watch's "Daily Brief" newsletter every day. The newsletter was named an honoree in the Webby Awards in 2025.

Stroehlein's commentary articles have appeared in "most major newspapers in Europe and North America, and many in Asia and Africa as well." In 2019, he wrote a travelogue essay with Human Rights Watch colleague Steve Swerdlow for the Los Angeles Review of Books examining Uzbekistan's efforts at reform.

In a 2015 essay for Politico, he reported on the war crimes trial of former Chadian president Hissène Habré. In a 2014 article, "40,000 Reasons Why Sri Lanka Is No Model for Nigeria", he criticized the plan by Nigeria to use the "Sri Lankan method" to crush Boko Haram. A 2013 article for The Independent (UK) lamented "Liberia's post-civil war reality", and a 2012 article for the same newspaper entitled "On the Trail of Boko Haram", he reported from northern Nigeria. A 2011 piece for CNN addressed the question of "Why Uzbekistan matters". In another 2011 essay, "Lessons from a Decade of Conflict", for Al-Quds Al-Arabi, he wrote that ten years after 9/11, "it is tempting to wonder if the world has not learned anything at all about conflict and conflict resolution."

In the closing days of Sri Lanka's war against the Tamil Tigers, Stroehlein wrote in The Guardian about the government's military approach to civilians in the remaining conflict zones, calling them, "Sri Lanka's 50,000 hostages."

In the Financial Times in 2006, he called for "expanding freedom of information projects reporting to and about Uzbekistan." In 2003, he wrote for Time magazine about the influence of Russian media in Belarus. In a 2002 essay, "Censorship Wins Out", published in Online Journalism Review and reprinted in McGraw-Hill book called 75 Arguments, Stroehlein argued that the role of web-based information in authoritarian states was similar to samizdat in former communist Czechoslovakia.

Stroehlein has also authored tens of articles in the Czech daily Britské listy.

== Miscellaneous ==
He is proficient in Czech, German, and Russian.
