= Arne Liljedahl Lynngård =

Norwegian economist and businessman

Arne Liljedahl Lynngård is a Norwegian economist, businessman, and human-rights activist who is currently the Executive Director of the Church City Mission (Kirkens Bymisjon) in Bergen.

The former CEO of Skjoldnes Holding Inc., a property development company, he has worked in a wide range of business sectors.

Bergensavisen noted in 2015 that he "has been involved in social causes as long as he can remember and has spent much of his adult life in human-rights work." A former chairman of the Rafto Foundation for Human Rights and of the Rafto Prize Committee, he is currently a council member of the Norwegian Helsinki Committee.

== Education ==
Born and raised in Bergen, Lynngård studied at the Norwegian School of Economics (NHH) beginning in 1986, receiving a Master of Science (MSc) in Economics in 1990 and an Executive MBA in Management Control in 1996.

== Career ==
=== Rafto Foundation ===
His connection with the Bergen-based Rafto Human Rights Foundation, named for Thorolf Rafto, professor of economic history at the Norwegian School of Economics in Bergen, began in 1997. From that year until 2002, Lynngård was a board member of the foundation; from 2002 to 2007 he was chairman of the foundation's board; from 2002 to 2009 he was also chair of the foundation's Rafto Prize Committee, which selects the winners of the Rafto Prize for Human Rights.

In July 2005, Lynngård and four other human-rights activists were deported from the Western Sahara. They had traveled to the capital of the region, Laayoune, to gather information about human-rights violations, meet activist Latif Allal, and witness the trial of 16 young defendants. After they contacted Allal, Allal was arrested, beaten, and then set free. Also, before Lynngård and his colleagues could attend the trial, they were summoned to the local police department and ordered by the police chief to leave the Western Sahara. That night, after having failed to leave, they were physically thrown out of their hotel shortly after midnight by armed riot police. They were then placed in two cabs and driven to Agadir, Morocco, 10–12 hours away.

In March 2007, Lynngård was planning to visit Vietnamese dissident Thich Quang Do, deputy head of the Unified Buddhist Church of Vietnam, who had been under "pagoda arrest" since 1998, to present him with the Rafto Prize. In February, however, the Vietnamese embassy in Copenhagen sent a letter to the Rafto Foundation stating that it would not permit such a meeting on the grounds that the foundation had damaged relations between Norway and Vietnam. In reply to the letter, the Rafto Foundation issued a statement to the effect that the purpose of Lynngård's visit to Vietnam was not just to visit Thich Quang Do but also to meet with Vietnamese officials and learn about Vietnam's efforts to develop a democratic system. In March, Lynngård's wife, Therese Jebsen, who also worked for Rafto, went to Vietnam and was arrested by military police along with another activist and two reporters for Norway's TV2.

In 2009, Lynngård spoke at the Oslo Freedom Forum about the ongoing cultural genocide of the Uighur people by the government of China. In December 2014, he stated that the treatment of the Uighur people had gone "from bad to worse" and that the international community had a duty to remind Chinese leaders of their obligations under agreements with other countries. He also said that when top Western politicians refuse to meet with the Dalai Lama, they were sending the wrong signal.

=== SIU, Skjoldnes, and Econa ===
Lynngård was director of the Norwegian Center for International Cooperation in Education (SIU), based in Bergen, from September 2009 to September 2010. He was CEO of Skjoldnes Holding AS, also based in Bergen, from October 2010 to May 2015, and deputy member of Skjolnes Holding's board from May 2013 to June 2015.

From September 2014 to May 2015 he was vice chairman of the Board at Econa; since May 2015, he has been chairman of Econa's board. In April 2015, after being elected board chairman of Econa, he said that he was eager to defend the professional status of economists and to bring greater visibility to their role in society.

He was a deputy member of the board of the Bergen Academy of Art and Design from 2011 to December 2015.

== Church City Mission ==
Since June 2015, he has been executive director of the Church City Mission in Bergen. It has approximately 100 employees and 300 volunteers and is affiliated with the Church of Norway.

In May 2015, just before he began working for the Church City Mission, Lynngård said that when he had seen the advertisement for the position, he thought of something Eleanor Roosevelt had said: "Where, after all, do universal human rights begin? In small places...so small that they cannot be seen on any maps of the world...[in] the neighborhood...the school or college...the work[place]." Lynngård said that in many ways, the Church City Mission is "an answer to Eleanor Roosevelt's challenge."

When Lynngård took up this position, it was noted that the head of the Church City Mission traditionally remains in the job for 17 years, and that this meant Lynngård might hold it until he reached retirement age.

== Personal life ==
He is married to Therese Jebsen.
