= Amir Ahmad Nasr =

Sudanese blogger (born 1986)

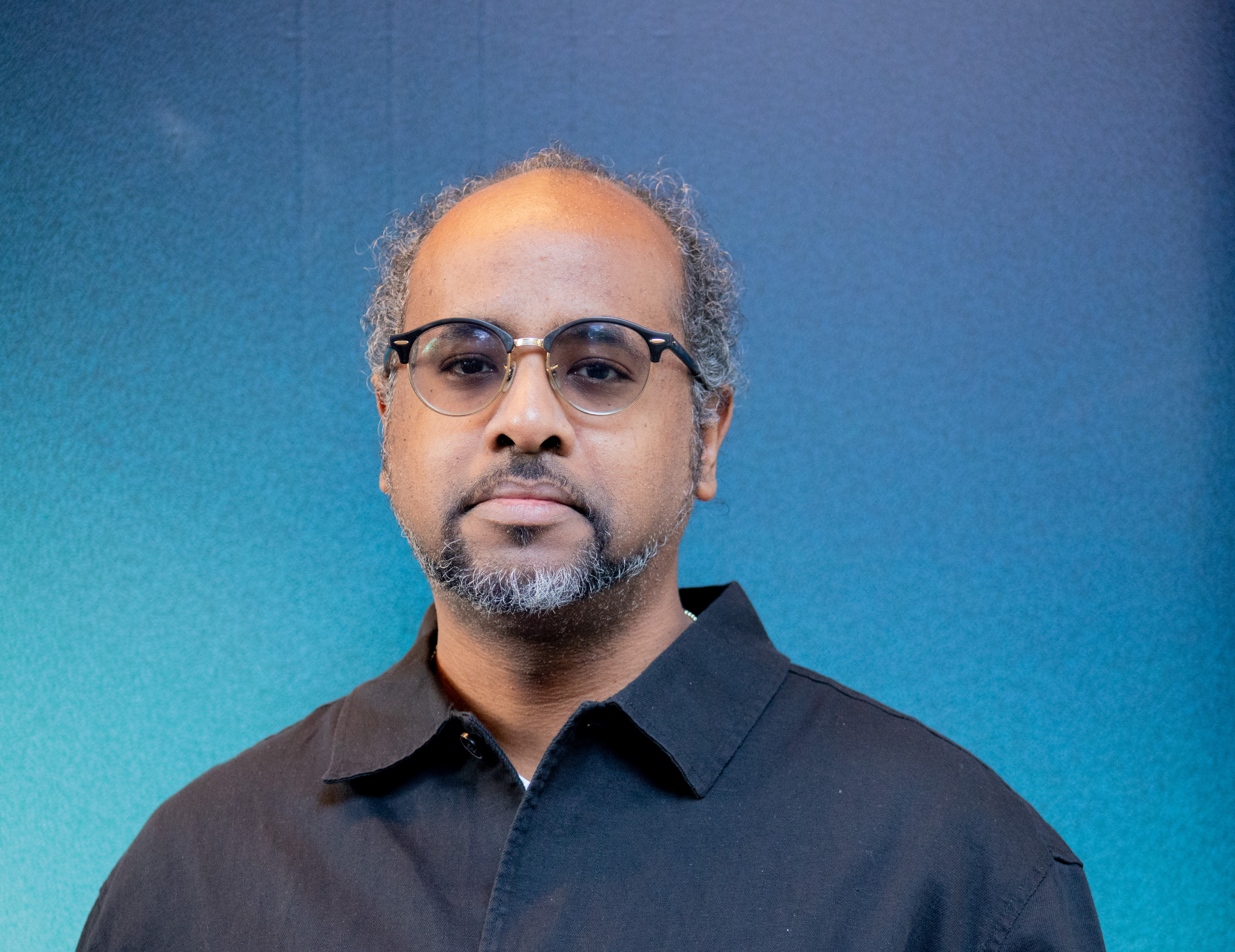
Amir Ahmad Nasr at Oslo Freedom Forum 2025

Amir Ahmad Nasr (Khartoum, 1986) is a Sudanese blogger and digital media and marketing consultant. He is the writer of an English-language blog, The Sudanese Thinker.

== Early life and education ==
Born in Khartoum, Nasr was raised in Qatar and Malaysia. Raised by parents who were particularly pious Muslims, he began his education at international schools in Qatar and Kuala Lumpur. Nasr became more and more devout, but later, as a teenager in Kuala Lumpur, he encountered young liberal-minded Muslims online and in person and began to question his faith. He started his own blog, on which he recorded his shifting religious views.

== Career ==
Nasr began writing his blog in 2006 because he felt that not enough Sudanese citizens were speaking out about Darfur. His blog helped encourage other people in Sudan to start English-language blogs. It also became a significance source of information for foreign journalists and audiences.

Originally, Nasr's blog was anonymous, but in 2011, during the Arab Spring, he revealed his identity. Since then he has become an author, activist, social entrepreneur, and human-rights advocate.

=== My Isl@m: How Fundamentalism Stole My Mind – And Doubt Freed My Soul ===
In 2013, he published his first book, My Isl@m: How Fundamentalism Stole My Mind—And Doubt Freed My Soul. In a starred review, Publishers Weekly praised the book for “seamlessly blend[ing] memoir with political thought and activism.” Author Clay Shirky has described the book as “a love letter to freedom of speech.” Another author, Ken Wilber, called it “an important and significant book.”

=== Other writings ===
In a June 2011 article for the Guardian, he wrote that the secession of what is now South Sudan would not end Sudan's “Afro-Arab identity crisis” or “magically turn the country into a genuinely Arab Islamic nation-state despite what Omar al-Bashir may want.” On the contrary, he wrote, “Sudan always has been and always will be a multi-ethnic, multi-religious melting pot.”

In January 2012, he wrote an article for Al Jazeera, titled "Reviving the "New Sudan vision. The article is about John Garang, the Southern Sudanese Christian rebel turned-statesmen.

In June 2012, he wrote an article for Foreign Policy entitled “Sudan Needs a Revolution.” He suggested that the tide was “shifting against Bashir,” and that “most Sudanese citizens aren’t yearning for more Islamism, but are instead focusing on and demanding better economic conditions, transparency, and accountability.” While “this battle will ultimately be fought and won by Sudanese, the international community also has an important role to play.”

=== Other professional activities ===
Nasr is a contributor to Global Voices Online. He organized The Future of Islam In the Age of New Media, an online audio seminar featuring 60 speakers.

== Honors and awards ==
My Islam was listed In Foreign Policy's "What to Read in 2013," Nasr's blog was a three-times finalist for the Weblog Awards.
