= Asma Khalifa =

Libyan women's rights and peace activist

Asma Khalifa is a Libyan women's rights and peace activist. Her work has spanned across numerous countries including Libya, Yemen and Syria. She won the Luxembourg Peace Prize in 2016 and was named as one of the 100 most influential young Africans of 2017 by the Africa Youth Awards.

== Career ==
Asma Khalifa was born in Zuwara and is of Amazigh (Berber) origins. She has worked on women's rights issues since before 2011 when she became involved in youth work. Growing up as a non-Arab, Amazigh Libyan under the rule of Colonel Muammar Qaddafi, Khalifa witnessed the negative impact of discrimination and violence against women. She has spent her career contributing to the building of Libya's civil society and has recently worked on peace-building and conflict transformation in the country. Since 2014 she has focused more on peacemaking in Libya, Syria and Yemen. Her work in Libya has included improving women's participation in local government and fighting against gender-based violence. Khalifa has also worked as a consultant for a Libyan non-governmental organisation on a project to combat child marriage and is a trainer for the Young Peace-builders project run by Tripoli Good. She has documented sexual violence in Syria and is interviewing female refugees for research for a book on the human side of the refugee crisis. In addition, Khalifa has worked to investigate and research air strikes in Yemen.

Khalifa co-founded the Tamazight Women Movement, a think tank and campaign group that advocates for greater gender equality for the indigenous women of North Africa. She was awarded the Luxembourg Peace Prize by the Schengen Peace Foundation on 25 May 2016 for work her work to promote peace and conflict resolution. Khalifa was named by the Africa Youth Awards as one of the 100 most influential young Africans of 2017. In 2016-17 she was a consultant at the Friedrich Ebert Foundation and was training peace building. As of 2019, Khalifa is currently seeking her PhD in political science and philosophy at the University of Hamburg.
