= Vincent Manoharan =

Vincent Manoharan is an Indian human rights activist, he is known mostly for creating the National Campaign on Dalit Human Rights (NCDHR), and organization that focuses on stemming the discrimination still present within India's caste system.

== Biography ==
Manoharan grew up in a Christian mission compound in India, being a member of the Dalit caste, he has witnessed the human rights discrimination first hand; " Being an Untouchable (Dalit) and a grass root activist for the last 30 years, I am familiar with the life experience – the pathos and sufferings, hopes and faith - of the discriminated and oppressed." Through this experience he became motivated to participate in the Indian Human Rights struggle, he founded the NCDHR in 1998 with the hope of increasing exposure to the discrimination still present in India.

== Human rights activism ==
Manoharan founded the NCDHR in 1998 with several other human rights activists, with the goal of raising visibility on the issue of caste discrimination. A total of 78 Dalit activists collaborated in forming NCDHR; they were upset that even after 50 years of independence of British rule, and a national constitution with statutes aimed at stopping caste discrimination, there was not a significant decrease in incidents relating to discrimination against Dalits across India and Asia.

To combat these issues, the group decided on a three phase strategy. The first phase is to raise the visibility of specific events taking place in the region where Dalits have been discriminated against, mostly at the local, state and national levels. Phase 2 is to bring awareness of these Human Rights issues to the international stage. The third phase is to hold the Judiciary system accountable for enforcing the laws stipulated in the constitution.

Recently the plight of the Dalit people has become more internationally known and confronted. In 2002, the United Nations Committee on the Elimination of Racial Discrimination condemned caste discrimination. In December 2006 Prime Minister Manmohan Singh stated that "‘untouchability’ is not just social discrimination. It is a blot on humanity.". In 2009, a deceleration was made that discrimination against a group of people (Dalits) is a human rights violation was a huge success for Manoharan and the NCDHR.

He also helped in the founding of the International Dalit Solidarity Network, a group that fights caste discrimination on a global level.

In 2007 the Manoharan and the NCDHR won the Thorolf Rafto Memorial Prize for their work in the field of Human Rights.
