= List of humanitarian and service awards =

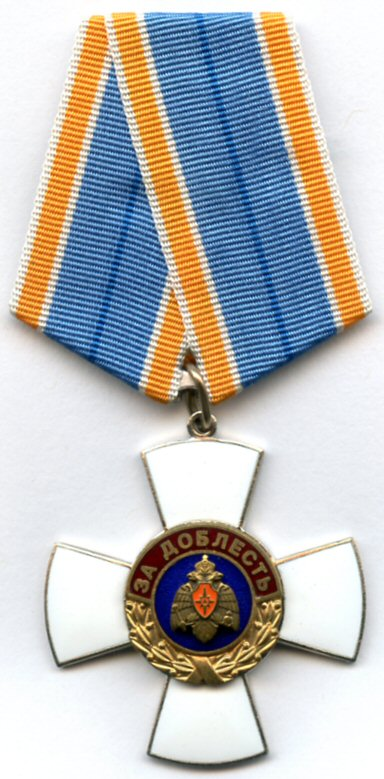
EMERCOM Cross for Valor

This list of humanitarian and service awards is an index to articles on notable awards given for humanitarianism and service in the sense of community service, public service or selfless service. The list is organized by region and country. Some of the awards are restricted to citizens or residents of one country or region, while others are not restricted.

== International. (nations) ==
| Award | Sponsor | Notes |
|---|---|---|
| Citizen of the World | United Nations Correspondents Association | |
| Florence Nightingale Medal | International Committee of the Red Cross | Those distinguished in the nursing field |
| Nansen Refugee Award | United Nations High Commissioner for Refugees | In recognition of outstanding service to the cause of refugees, displaced or stateless people |
| Henry Dunant Medal | International Red Cross and Red Crescent Movement | |
| Aurora Prize for Awakening Humanity | Aurora Humanitarian Initiative | $1 million international humanitarian award recognizing individuals for humanitarian work. It is awarded on behalf of the survivors of the Armenian Genocide and in gratitude to their saviors. |

== Africa ==
| Country | Award | Sponsor | Notes |
|---|---|---|---|
| Sudan | Ibrahim Prize | Mo Ibrahim Foundation | $5 million award for African heads of state for development achievement |
| Nigeria | APCN Humanitarian Awards | Aid People Change Nigeria Charity and Orphanage Organisation | Award plaques and certificates, signed with authentic orthographies of African music legends and icons to recognise people for their immense contributions to the growth of humanity, with their various acts. |
| Nigeria | Nigerian Humanitarian Awards and Magazine | | |
| South Africa | Achievers/Humanitarian Awards | Rain Queen Modjadji Awards | Founded by Princess Dr Tebogo Mokope Modjadji-kekana. Granddaughter to the late Queen. Founded since 2020 |
| Zimbabwe | Global Charity Awards|| | NGOs | It's an Awards ceremony for Non-profit Organizations around the Globe that aims to award the commitment, innovation and determination of the best Charity organizations. Being shortlisted for or winning this Award brings credibility to your organization, it's a way of showing the World at large that donating to your cause is putting money in safe hands, and generate trust in your brand. |

== Americas ==
=== Canada ===
| Award | Sponsor | Notes |
|---|---|---|
| Juno Humanitarian Award | Canadian Academy of Recording Arts and Sciences | To Canadian musicians who have made significant humanitarian efforts (since 2006) |
| CHL Humanitarian of the Year | Canadian Hockey League | To the Canadian Hockey League player judged to have made the most notable contribution to his community in a humanitarian sense |
| Charlie Conacher Humanitarian Award | National Hockey League | To a National Hockey League (NHL) player who made "outstanding contribution to humanitarian or community service projects" (since 1968) |
| Dan Snyder Memorial Trophy | Ontario Hockey League | Ontario Hockey League player who is a positive role model, and makes a notable humanitarian contribution within his community. |
| Doug Wickenheiser Memorial Trophy | Western Hockey League | Player who best shows a commitment to his community and to humanitarian values |
| QMJHL Humanitarian of the Year | Quebec Major Junior Hockey League | One Quebec Major Junior Hockey League player for humanitarianism and community involvement |
| The Wolf Award | The Wolf Project | For individuals, organizations, and communities in recognition of their efforts to serve humanity and to reduce racial intolerance and to improve peace and understanding |
| Terry Fox Humanitarian Award | Terry Fox Humanitarian Award Program | Canadian citizens or landed immigrants who have completed community humanitarian service and display "courage and determination by overcoming adversity" |

=== United States ===
| Award | Sponsor | Notes |
|---|---|---|
| Carnegie Medal | Carnegie Hero Fund | Persons who perform extraordinary acts of heroism in civilian life in the United States and Canada, and those disabled and the dependents of those killed saving or attempting to save others. |
| Conrad N. Hilton Humanitarian Prize | Conrad N. Hilton Foundation | Largest humanitarian award in the world. |
| AAAS Award for Science Diplomacy | American Association for the Advancement of Science | Outstanding contribution to furthering international cooperation in science and engineering |
| APA International Humanitarian Award | American Psychological Association | Extraordinary humanitarian service and activism by a psychologist or a team of psychologists, including professional and/or volunteer work conducted primarily in the field with underserved populations |
| ARRL International Humanitarian Award | American Radio Relay League | Amateurs who, through Amateur Radio, are devoted to promoting the Welfare of mankind. |
| Abraham Horwitz Award | PAHO Foundation | Leadership that has improved people's health and lives in the Americas. |
| Albert Schweitzer Prize for Humanitarianism | Albert Schweitzer Fellowship | Exemplary contributions to humanity and the environment. |
| Algernon Sydney Sullivan Award | Algernon Sydney Sullivan Foundation | Excellence of character and service to humanity |
| Bishop John T. Walker Distinguished Humanitarian Service Award | Africare | Those whose work has made a significant impact on raising the standard of living in Africa |
| Bob Hope Humanitarian Award | Academy of Television Arts & Sciences | Humanitarian efforts |
| Brandeis Award (privacy) | Patient Privacy Rights | Significant intellectual, cultural, legal, scholarly, and technical contributions to the field of health information privacy |
| Carnegie Medal of Philanthropy | Carnegie family of institutions | Individuals who have dedicated their private wealth to the public good |
| Cherokee Inspired Comfort Award | Cherokee Uniforms | For exceptional service by nurses and other health care professionals |
| Civil Courage Prize | Train Foundation | Recognizes "steadfast resistance to evil at great personal risk — rather than military valor." |
| Courage to Care Award | Anti-Defamation League | To honor rescuers of Jews during the Holocaust |
| David Angell Humanitarian Award | American Screenwriters Association | To individuals in the entertainment industry who contribute to global wellbeing through donations of time, expertise or other support to improve the human condition |
| Elizabeth Fleming Stier Award | Institute of Food Technologists | To a member of the Institute of Food Technologists (IFT) who has pursued humanitarian ideals and unselfish dedication to the well-being of the food industry, academia, students, or the general public |
| Eugene V. Debs Award | Eugene V. Debs Foundation | Honoring a person whose work has been consistent with the spirit, values, and legacy of Eugene V. Debs and who has contributed to the advancement of the causes of industrial unionism, social justice, or world peace (since 1965) |
| Harrison Tweed Award | American Bar Association / National Legal Aid & Defender Association | State and local bar associations that develop or significantly expand projects or programs to increase access to civil legal services for poor persons or criminal defense services for indigents |
| Henry R. Kravis Prize in Nonprofit Leadership | Claremont McKenna College | Those who have demonstrated 'bold leadership' in the nonprofit sector and have shared their best practices with others |
| Henry Viscardi Achievement Awards | Viscardi Center | Exemplary leaders in the disability sector around the globe who have had a profound impact on changing the lives of people with disabilities and champion their rights. |
| Hodson Award | American Bar Association | Extraordinary service by a government or public-sector legal office |
| IRI Freedom Award | International Republican Institute | Individuals who have worked to advance freedom and democracy in their countries and around the world |
| Ivan Allen Jr. Prize for Social Courage | Georgia Tech | Individuals who stand up for moral principles and render service to humanity without regard for personal or professional peril. Recipients positively affect public discourse in spite of the risk to their careers, their livelihoods, and even their lives. |
| Jean Hersholt Humanitarian Award | Academy of Motion Picture Arts and Sciences | Outstanding contributions to humanitarian causes |
| Jefferson Awards for Public Service | American Institute for Public Service | People who do extraordinary things without expectation of recognition |
| Lasker-Bloomberg Public Service Award | Lasker Foundation | Individual or organization whose public service has profoundly enlarged the possibilities for medical research and the health sciences and their impact on the health of the public. |
| Latin Recording Academy Person of the Year | Latin Recording Academy | Artistic achievement in the Latin music industry and dedication to philanthropy |
| Letelier-Moffitt Human Rights Award | Institute for Policy Studies | Those advancing the cause of human rights in the Americas. |
| Library of Congress Living Legend | Library of Congress | Creative contributions to American life. Those honored include artists, writers, activists, film makers, physicians, entertainers, sports figures, and public servants. |
| MLS Humanitarian of the Year Award | Major League Soccer | Major League Soccer player who exemplifies both skill on the field and service within the community. |
| MacArthur Fellows Program | MacArthur Foundation | Individuals, working in any field, who have shown "extraordinary originality and dedication in their creative pursuits and a marked capacity for self-direction" and are citizens or residents of the United States. |
| MusiCares Person of the Year | The Recording Academy | Artistic achievement in the music industry and dedication to philanthropy. |
| Marian Anderson Award | Marian Anderson Award | Established artist, not necessarily a singer, who exhibits leadership in a humanitarian area. A separate prize, the "Marian Anderson Prize for Emerging Classical Artists" is given to promising young classical singers. |
| Patronal Medal | Catholic University of America | Distinguished service in the advancement of Marian devotion, theology, or general appreciation of the place of Mary in the life of the Catholic Church." |
| Philip Loeb Humanitarian Award | Actors' Equity Association | Equity member who has performed a unique and outstanding service on behalf of his or her fellow members and whose quality of service, ideas and contribution has set him or her apart from others; someone who truly perpetuates the legacy inherited from Philip Loeb. |
| President's Call to Service Award | President of the United States | People who have completed more than 4,000 hours of community service. It is the highest level of the President's Volunteer Service Award. |
| President's Volunteer Service Award | President of the United States | Volunteers that give hundreds of hours per year helping others through the President's Council on Service and Civic Participation. The award can be granted to individuals, families and organizations located throughout the United States. |
| Profile in Courage Award | John F. Kennedy Library Foundation | Individuals (often elected officials) who, by acting in accord with their conscience, risked their careers or lives by pursuing a larger vision of the national, state or local interest in opposition to popular opinion or pressure from constituents or other local interests |
| Prudential Spirit of Community Award | National Association of Secondary School Principals | Middle level and high school students for outstanding service to others at the local, state, and national level. |
| Public Service Recognition Award | Town of Dedham, Massachusetts | Citizen or citizens of Dedham who by his/her actions best exemplifies the spirit of public service through their sharing of time, talent, and energy for the betterment of our Community." |
| Public Welfare Medal | National Academy of Sciences | Distinguished contributions in the application of science to the public welfare. |
| Raoul Wallenberg Award | Raoul Wallenberg Committee of the United States | Individuals, organizations, and communities whose courage, selflessness and success against great odds personified those of Raoul Wallenberg himself." |
| Salvatori Prize for American Citizenship | The Heritage Foundation | To an American citizen or organization who upholds and advances the principles of the American Founding |
| Sidney Hollander Award | Sidney Hollander Foundation | To a person who had worked diligently towards obtaining equal rights for African Americans in Maryland (1947 – around 1964) |
| Spingarn Medal | NAACP | For achievement by Black Americans (since 1915) |
| Spirit of Hope | Billboard | Awarded to a Latin artist for their philanthropic and humanitarian contributions beyond their musical work (since 1996) |
| Templeton Prize | John Templeton Foundation | To a living person who "has made an exceptional contribution to affirming life's spiritual dimension, whether through insight, discovery, or practical works" (since 1972) |
| The Nichols-Chancellor's Medal | Vanderbilt University | Persons who define the 21st century and exemplify the best qualities of the human spirit. |
| The Ridenhour Prizes | Type Media Center | Those who persevere in acts of truth-telling that protect the public interest, promote social justice or illuminate a more just vision of society |
| Thomas Jefferson Foundation Medal in Citizen Leadership | Thomas Jefferson Foundation | Distinguished contributions in citizen leadership |
| Man of the Year/Person of the Year | Time (magazine) | Person, group, idea or object that for better or for worse... has done the most to influence the events of the year. |
| Wallenberg Medal | University of Michigan | Outstanding humanitarians whose actions on behalf of the defenseless and oppressed reflect the heroic commitment and sacrifice of Raoul Wallenberg |
| William E. Harmon Foundation Award for Distinguished Achievement Among Negroes | William E. Harmon Foundation | Distinguished achievements in eight different fields: literature, music, fine arts, business and industry, science and innovation, education, religious service, and race relations |
| William J. Brennan Award | Association of the Federal Bar of the State of New Jersey | Outstanding jurist, attorney, or other individual whose contributions to the law deserve special recognition |
| Woodrow Wilson Award for Public Service | Woodrow Wilson International Center for Scholars | Participation in efforts to improve the global community through collaboration and open dialogue. |
| Yanick Dupre Memorial Award | American Hockey League | American Hockey League's man of the year for service to his local community |

== Asia ==
| Country | Award | Sponsor | Notes |
|---|---|---|---|
| Hong Kong | Hong Kong Humanity Award | Hong Kong Red Cross / RTHK | Those live up to and put into practice the spirit of humanity. |
| India | Santokbaa Humanitarian Award | SRK Knowledge Foundation | Honouring the spirit of the selfless humanitarians. |
| India | Indira Gandhi Prize | Indira Gandhi Memorial Trust | Promoting international peace, development and a new international economic order etc. |
| India | Mother Teresa Awards | Harmony Foundation | Promotion of peace, equality and social justice, and encouragement of justice and peaceful coexistence |
| India | Neerja Bhanot Award | Neerja Bhanot-Pan Am Trust | Indian woman subjected to social injustice, who faces the situation with grit and determination and extends help to other women in similar distress. |
| India | Real Heroes Award | CNN-News18 | Ordinary citizens who have devoted their lives towards shaping a better society |
| Pakistan | Tamgha-i-Khidmat | Government of Pakistan | It is the 5th highest honour given by the Government of Pakistan to both the military and Civil Armed Forces. |
| Pakistan | Tamgha-e-Quaid-e-Azam | Government of Pakistan | Tamgha-e-Quaid-e-Azam or Medal of the Great Leader is a civil award conferred by the Government of Pakistan on those who have attained distinction in the fields of science, art, literature, or distinction in the fields of sports and nursing; or for rendering dedicated services with selfless devotion in human rights and public service. |
| Pakistan | Hilal-e-Pakistan | President of Pakistan | It is the second-highest civil award and decoration of Pakistan. The award seeks to recognize those people who have made "meritorious contribution to the national interests of Pakistan, or cultural, social contribution, or other significant public or private endeavors". The award is not limited to Pakistani citizens and, while it is a civilian award, it can also be conferred upon foreign nationals. It is bestowed by the President of Pakistan once a year on the eve of Independence day. |
| Pakistan | Nishan-e-Pakistan | President of Pakistan | It is the highest civil award and decoration of Pakistan bestowed by the president on foreign nationals as well as for the highest degree of service to the country. |
| Pakistan | Nishan-e-Imtiaz | President of Pakistan | The Nishan-e-Imtiaz (Order of Excellence) is one of the state organized civil decorations of Pakistan. It is awarded for achievements towards world recognition for Pakistan or an outstanding service for the country. |
| Pakistan | Tamgha-i-Imtiaz | President of Pakistan | Tamgha-i-Imtiaz (Award of Excellence) is a state-organised honour of Pakistan. It is given to any civilian in Pakistan based on their achievements. It can also be awarded to foreign citizens who have performed great service to Pakistan. |
| Pakistan | Hilal-i-Imtiaz | Government of Pakistan | The Hilaal-e-Imtiyaaz (Crescent of Excellence) is the second highest civilian award and honour given to both civilians and military officers of the Pakistan Armed Forces by the Government of Pakistan. It recognises individuals who have made an "especially meritorious contribution to the security or national interests of Pakistan, world peace, cultural or other significant public endeavors". |
| Pakistan | Sitara-i-Imtiaz | Government of Pakistan | The Sitara-i-Imtiaz (Star of Excellence) is the third highest honour and civilian award of Pakistan. It recognizes individuals who have made an "especially meritorious contribution to the security or national interests of Pakistan, world peace, cultural or other significant public endeavours". |
| Pakistan | HBL PSL Hamaray Heroes Award | Pakistan Cricket Board | This award (along with a Cash Prize of PKR 240,000.00) was introduced by Pakistan Cricket Board during the tournament of Pakistan Super League in 2020. Individuals from different walks of life (including peace, human rights, sports, education, healthcare, art, culture, music, social work and technology) can be nominated. |
| Israel | Righteous Among the Nations | State of Israel | Non-Jews who risked their lives to save Jews during the Holocaust |
| Japan | Hideyo Noguchi Africa Prize | Japan International Cooperation Agency | Medical research and medical services to combat infectious and other diseases in Africa |
| Japan | Takeda Awards | Takeda Foundation | Social/economic well-being, individual/humanity well-being, and world environmental well-being |
| Philippines | Ramon Magsaysay Award | Ramon Magsaysay Award Foundation | For achievement by Asians |
| Philippines | Gusi Peace Prize | Gusi Peace Prize International | Global prize for peace, humanity, community service etc. |
| Saudi Arabia | King Faisal International Prize | King Faisal Foundation | For service to Islam |
| South Korea | Ho-Am Prize in Community Service | Samsung | Prizes for Science, Engineering, Medicine, Arts, and Community Service, plus a Special Prize |

== Europe ==
| Country | Award | Sponsor | Notes |
|---|---|---|---|
| Europe | European Charlemagne Youth Prize | European Parliament | Young people who have contributed towards the process of European integration |
| Europe | Solidar Silver Rose Award | Solidar Foundation | Individuals and organisations whose outstanding work is fuelled by vision and tireless commitment and whose achievements have contributed greatly to the struggle for a just and civil society |
| Austria | Austrian Holocaust Memorial Award | Austrian Service Abroad | Person or an institution, which has shown special endeavors for the memory of the Holocaust |
| Belgium | King Baudouin International Development Prize | King Baudouin Foundation | Outstanding contributions to development in Africa, initiated and led by Africans |
| Czech Republic | Via Bona Award | Via Foundation | Exemplary philanthropy of companies and individuals who have a history of strong support of the work of non-profit organizations in the Czech Republic. |
| France | Prix Blumenthal | Fondation Franco-américaine Florence Blumenthal | Discover young French artists, aid them financially, and in the process draw the United States and France closer together through the arts. |
| Germany | Charlemagne Prize | City of Aachen | Work done in the service of European unification |
| Germany | Hanns Martin Schleyer Prize | Hanns Martin Schleyer Foundation | Outstanding contributions to consolidating and strengthening the foundations of a community based on the principle of individual freedom. |
| Germany | Herder Prize | Alfred Toepfer Stiftung F.V.S. | Promotion of art and scientific relations in Central and Southeastern Europe |
| Germany | John Rabe Award | John Rabe Communication Centre | People who have worked in a special way on their own history, for international understanding and peace in the relationship with China |
| Germany | Steiger Award | Genesis | International award for accomplishment based in Bochum, Germany |
| Luxembourg | Vision for Europe Award | Edmond Israel Foundation | For outstanding achievements in taking Europe into the future |
| Norway | Thorolf Rafto Memorial Prize | Rafto Foundation for Human Rights | Independent voices that due to oppressive and corrupt regimes are not always heard |
| Russia | Awards of the Ministry for Emergency Situations of Russia | Ministry of Emergency Situations (Russia) | Various categories |
| Sweden | Edelstam Prize | Harald Edelstam Foundation | Outstanding contributions and exceptional courage in standing up for one's beliefs in the Defence of Human Rights |
| Sweden | Olof Palme Prize | Olof Palme Memorial Fund | Outstanding achievement in the spirit of Olof Palme |
| Sweden | Per Anger Prize | Swedish Government | For humanitarian work and initiatives in the name of democracy |
| Sweden | Right Livelihood Award | Right Livelihood Award Foundation | Those offering practical and exemplary answers to the most urgent challenges facing us today." |
| United Kingdom | 21st Century Leaders Awards | Trade plus Aid | Leaders of popular culture who have sought to use their celebrity to encourage social change |
| United Kingdom | Ahimsa Award | Institute of Jainology | Individuals who embody and promote the principles of Ahiṃsā Non-violence |
| United Kingdom | Albert Medal | Royal Society of Arts | For distinguished merit in promoting arts, manufactures, and commerce |
| United Kingdom | Benjamin Franklin Medal | Royal Society of Arts | For Anglo-American cooperation |
| United Kingdom | British Hero of the Holocaust | Government of the United Kingdom | British citizens who assisted in rescuing victims of the Holocaust |
| United Kingdom | Carnegie Hero Fund Trust | Carnegie Hero Fund Trust UK | Individuals who have been injured or financially disadvantaged as a result of undertaking an act of heroism or in fatal cases to provide for the family or other dependants. |
| United Kingdom | Diana Memorial Award | Diana Award | Work which young people make to society – especially those who are young ambassadors, young leaders, young humanitarians, fund raisers, environmental campaigners, peer mentors, sports leaders, and those who inspire others |
| United Kingdom | Grand Prior's Award | St John Ambulance | Self-motivated and capable young person's ongoing commitment, compassion, and support |
| United Kingdom | Grassroot Diplomat Initiative Award | Grassroot Diplomat | Outstanding diplomats and politicians who represent the people's interest at the highest level. |
| United Kingdom | Longford Prize | Prison Reform Trust | Organisation or individual working in the field of social or penal reform |
| United Kingdom | Nayef Al-Rodhan Prize | British Academy | Outstanding scholarly contributions to global cultural understanding |
| United Kingdom | Queen's Award for Voluntary Service | Department of Culture, Media and Sport | Volunteer work on service, meets a need, supported, recognised and respected for and by the local community. |
| United Kingdom | Robert Burns Humanitarian Award | Robert Burns World Federation | Group or individual who has saved, improved or enriched the lives of others or society as a whole, through self-sacrifice, selfless service, hands-on charitable or volunteer work, or other acts |
| United Kingdom | St Mungo Prize | St Mungo Prize | Person who has done most to improve and promote the city of Glasgow. |
| United Kingdom | Humanitarian Hero of the Year Award | AidEx Awards | The award recognize and celebrate stand-out individuals from the humanitarian aid and development community and showcases the courageous work and dedication that they put into their line of work. |
| United Kingdom | World Habitat Awards | Building and Social Housing Foundation | Projects from the Global South as well as the North that provide practical, innovative and sustainable solutions to current housing needs, which are capable of being transferred or adapted for use elsewhere. |

== Oceania ==
| Country | Award | Sponsor | Notes |
|---|---|---|---|
| Australia | Humanitarian Overseas Service Medal | Australian honours system | Presented to those who perform humanitarian service in a foreign country, in particular those working in dangerous environments or conditions or during a humanitarian crisis. |

== See also ==
- Lists of awards
- List of awards for contributions to society
