= Maria Kirbasova =

Russian human rights activist (1941–2011)

Maria Kirbassova
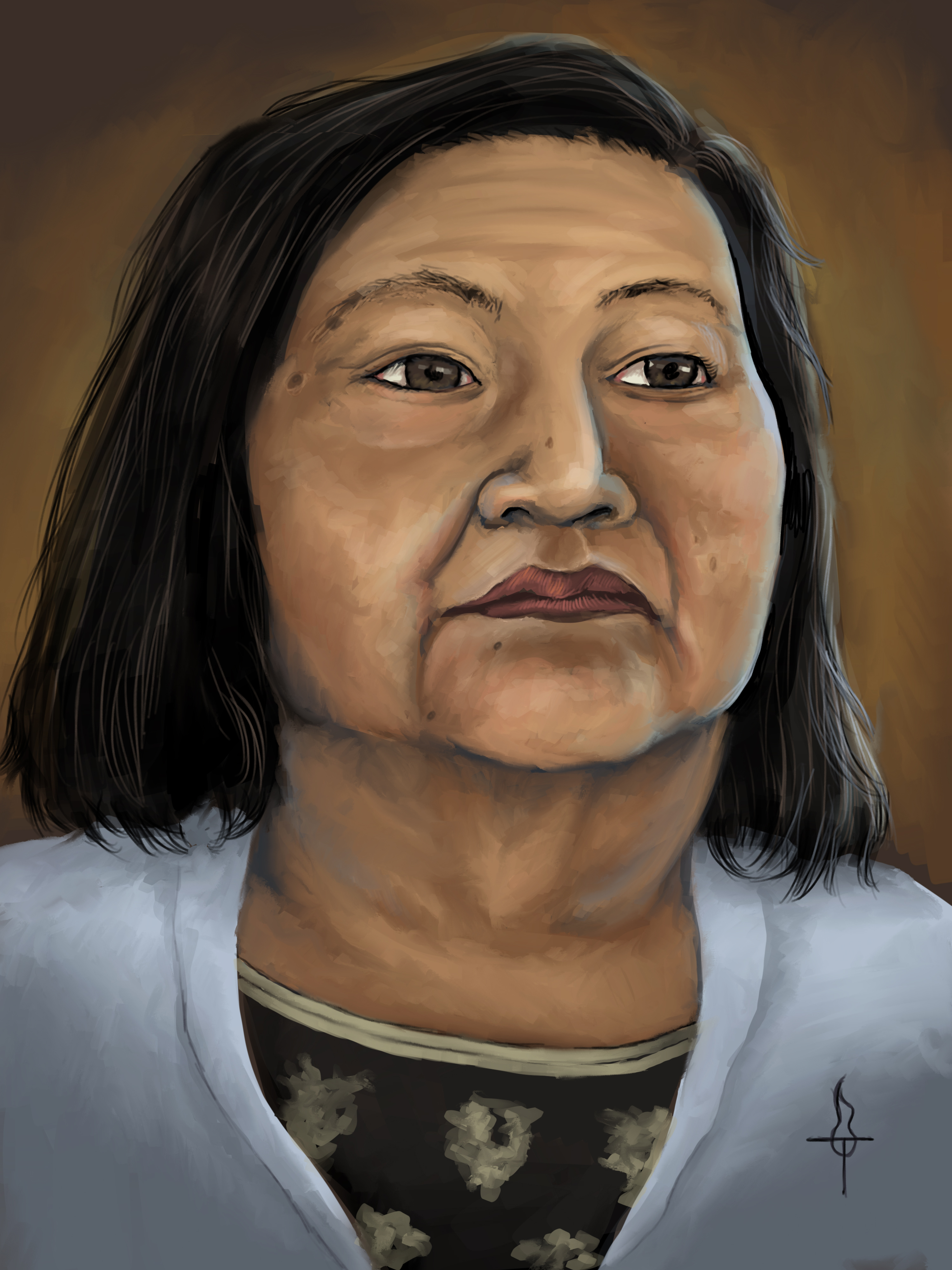
- Born: 1941; USSR
- Died: 2011 (aged 69–70); Sipoo, Finland

Maria Kirbasova (Russian: Мария Ивановна Кирбасова; 1941–2011), was a Kalmyk human rights activist who founded the Committee of Soldiers' Mothers of Russia. In 1995 she was awarded Thorolf Rafto Memorial Prize and the Seán MacBride Peace Prize and in 1996 she was given the Right Livelihood Award.

== Biography ==
Maria Kirbasova came from a Kalmyk family who were deported to Siberia during the Second World War. She was able to return in the 1950s when Khrushchev allowed it. She moved to Moscow where she was an engineer. She was a pacifist buddhist. Her son Petia was drafted to military service in 1988. Kirbassva had vehemently opposed his placement and was an organizer in the protests against the conditions for soldiers serving in the Soviet Army. She was elected chairman of the Committee of Soldiers' Mothers of Russia. during the conference in April 1991, held with the deputies of the Supreme Soviet of the USSR. Kirbasova also began protesting against Human rights violations during the Chechen war and by 1995 she was also working for the Rights of Young Russian Conscripts. She attended the Moscow-Grozny Maternal Compassion March.

Kirbassova moved to Finland with her daughter Kermen Soitu in 2008. She requested to be given residence. She was at that point unable to live alone having had a stroke and suffering from rheumatism. Her daughter was married and living in Finland. Initially her request was denied and Kirbassova was scheduled to be deported. A public outcry in part due to her work as a dissident and against the Chechen war, allowed her to get a review of her request and after an appeal, in 2009 she was allowed to remain in Finland. Kirbassova died there in 2011.
