= Conscription in the Soviet Union =

In the Soviet Union, conscription was used for the duration of its existence to bolster military function and operations. Conscription was introduced into what would become the Soviet Union in 1918, almost immediately after the October Revolution of 1917 to strengthen the forces of the Red Army. Following its introduction, conscription remained a constant presence in the Soviet state until its dissolution in 1991. Various policy amendments changed the volume of conscription intakes and the required length of service, with key changes to policy occurring in 1918, 1938 and 1967. Wartime conscription, specifically during World War II, saw a significant increase in conscription intake as well as a broadening of the pool of candidates available to be conscripted. Unlike in countries without a consistent history of conscription (such as the United States), there was relatively little resistance to conscription policy, as the concept was enshrined in the Soviet constitution as a mandatory requirement of citizenship, regardless of identity or status—though not regardless of gender—, and was seen as the national duty of all Soviet military-aged men.

== Historical periods ==
=== 1917–1939 ===
After the Bolshevik Revolution in Russia in 1917, the new communist government briefly experimented with a volunteer system of army recruitment but returned to the former system of conscription almost immediately in May 1918.

The policy saw few changes until September 1, 1939, when a new Law on Universal Military Service was enacted following the outbreak of WWII across Europe. This new law saw large increases in terms of service periods, ages of conscription and a restriction of potential exemptions. The general period of service was increased from 2 to 3 years, and conscription age was lowered from 19 to 17 for young men. Previous exemptions for those pursuing higher education were abolished, as well as exemptions on the grounds of family reasons (such as having several young children). The plan behind the increased conscription terms was to create two large groups of trained reserves, one for men up to 40 years of age, and the other for men up to 50 years of age.

=== World War II ===
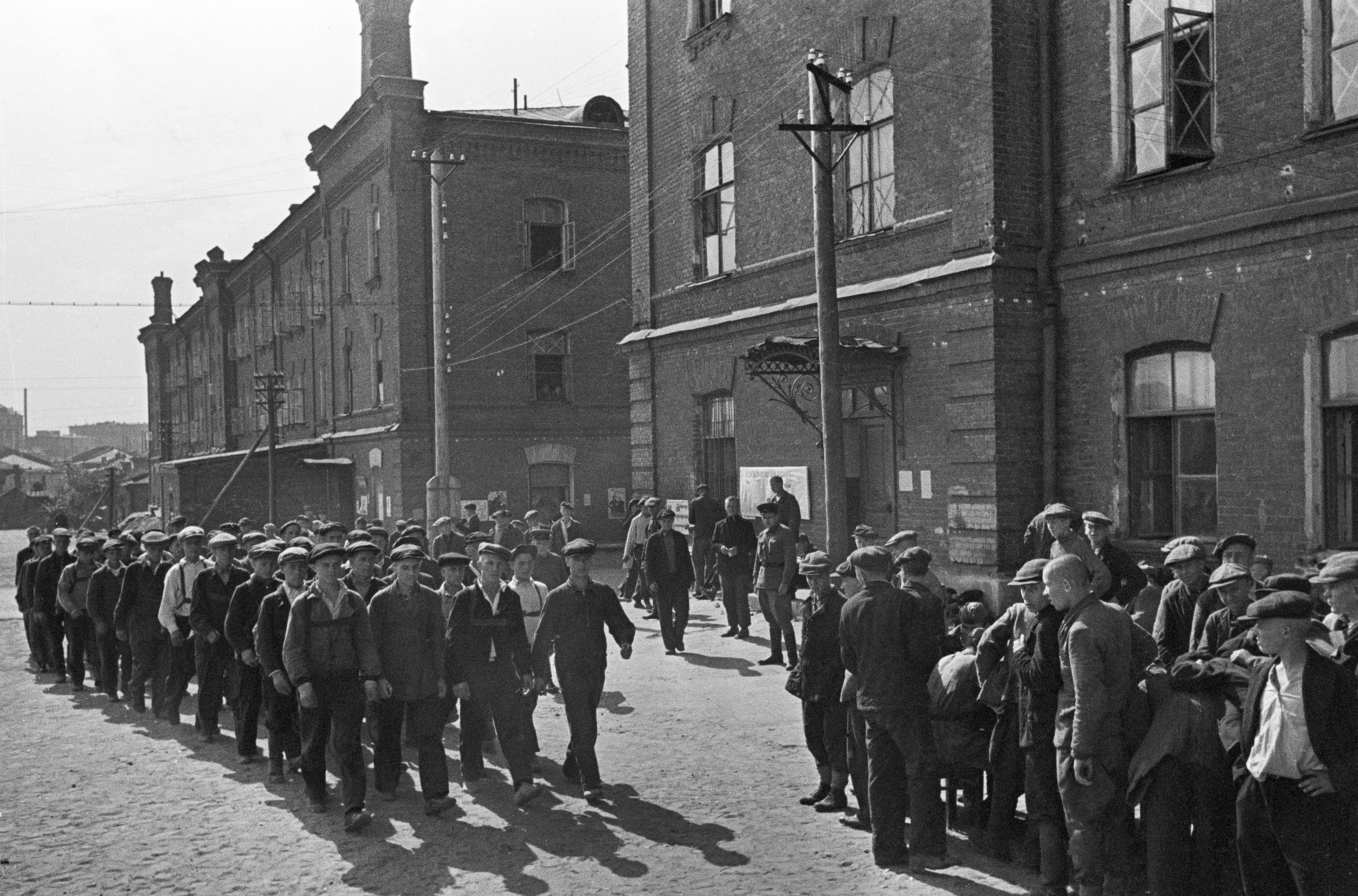
Conscripts in Moscow, 1941

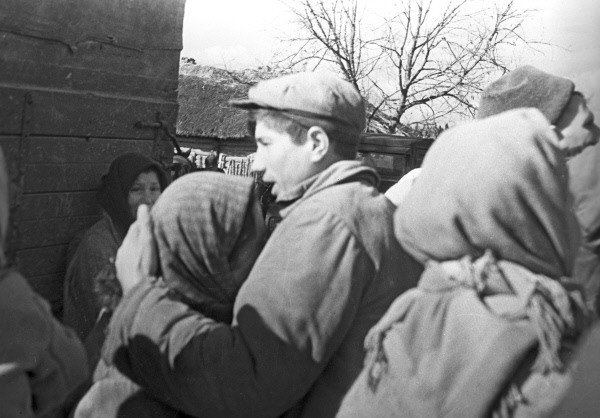
Conscript farewells in Nikolayev, Ukrainian SSR in 1941

On 22 June 1941, Germany launched a surprise attack against the USSR's western border. Soon after, in October 1941 the government passed a new military service law which states that all male citizens from the ages of 18 to 28 were liable for military service.

On 9 February 1942, Stalin issued an order which stated it would be expedient to “conscript into the ranks of the Red Army… citizens in the liberated territories between the ages of 17 to 30 who have not been conscripted into the Red Army during the previous months of the war” due to the fact they were “burning with hatred for the invader and a desire to participate in the subsequent liberation of their Soviet Motherland with weapons in their hands.” Following this order, non-Russian inhabitants of liberated territory began to be forcibly conscripted into the Red Army ranks as it moved westward toward Germany.

This broadening of the conscription pool created a diverse range of military personnel along the front lines, with soldiers of many different nationalities, ethnicities and languages being present.

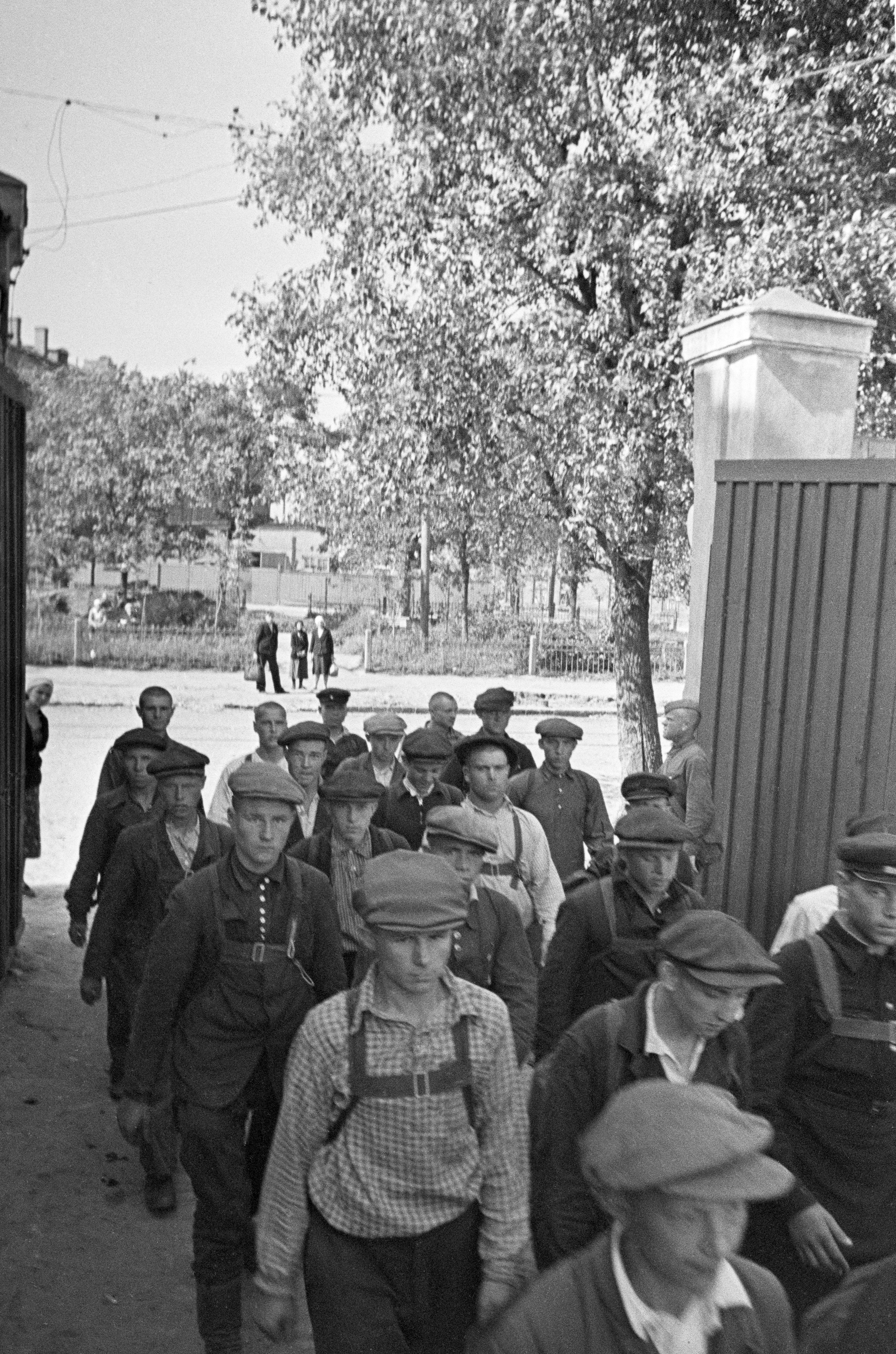
Soviet conscripts entering Voroshilov Barracks in Moscow, 1941

=== 1945–1991 ===
In 1955 the service term was reduced to three years from four in the air forces, coast-guard and coastal defence, and to four years from five in the Navy. This decision again was kept off official records, but was presumably part of the planned cut in manpower forces, announced in August 1955 and May 1956.

On 12 October 1967 a major amendment to the service law saw service periods shortened from 3 years to 2, and also saw the frequency of call-ups increase to twice per year. This amendment is said to have been caused by the large increase in young men reaching military age around this time. In order to adhere to the concept of ‘universal service’, while maintaining the size of the armed forces, conscript turnover was increased so that a large majority of young men reaching military age were still conscripted to serve, but not at the expense of increasing the size of the armed forces beyond the limits deemed necessary.

Following the 1967 amendment conditions for conscripts worsened considerably, with reports of abuse, hazing and even murder of conscripted soldiers becoming widespread. Conscripted soldiers, particularly those in their first year of service who had not yet earned either rank or respect to protect them, faced physical violence and sexual assault from superior officers, and regularly had their pay and food rations confiscated. Any resistance to such abuse was met with beatings, sometimes resulting in severe injuries, disability discharges and even death.

The official system of promoting some recently-recruited able soldiers to sergeant, so that they were placed in command positions shortly after enlistment, was undermined by an unofficial system structured around the years of service spent by each conscript. Junior conscripts became the subordinates to more experienced conscripts who had already served one or two years. This system was not officially recognised, but it became entrenched in conscript culture during the 1970s and 1980s.

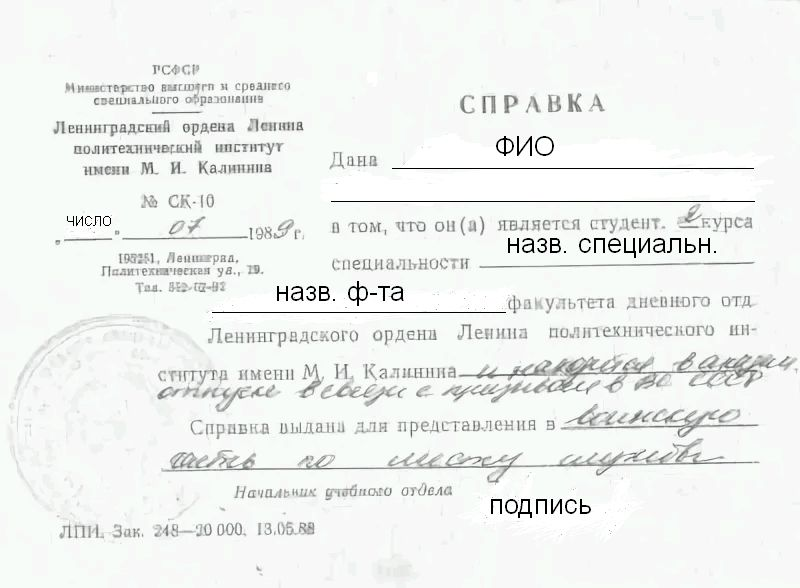
Confirmation sheet for the on-leave status of a student conscripted to the Soviet Military

Traditionally, all full-time Soviet students benefited from a draft postponement until graduation. If the college/university had a military chair (which provided training in a particular military specialty), its students became reserve officers and were exempt from service as private soldiers. Without a military chair the graduates were conscripted for a shortened term. For many people, an intention to avoid or at least to defer soldier service was a main reason for studying. However, between late autumn 1982 and 1988 the Soviet Union had a mandatory draft for students of most universities, with the peak conscription fraction in 1987. Students were drafted for two or, if for the navy, three years, of military service, typically after termination of the first or second academic year.

== Conscription of Women ==
The Soviet Union conscripted the most women for combat, comparative to other national military during wartime and especially during WWII. It is difficult to know the exact number of women conscripted during WWII and in what roles they served, as information about female soldiers was generally repressed in official reports and government documents from that period. However recently efforts have been made to uncover and rectify the records of female service personnel in the Soviet Union.

In the 1938 amendment to the service law, it was stated that any woman with relevant training and education, such as medical or mechanical would be liable for conscription service during times of war. Three all-female aviation unit were formed in late 1941 after an official decree from Stalin on the 8th of October 1941. This was only 4 months after the Soviet Union officially entered WWII, and by late March 1942 over 100,000 women had already been conscripted into air defence units. By the end of the war, the air defence force was more than 1/4 female, with 300,000 women, both volunteers and conscripts serving as communicators, machine gunners, pilots and medical personnel. Most female conscripts served behind the front lines in secondary positions and roles in an attempt to free up more men for front line duty. However it is believed that many women also served in combat positions, such as in tank regiments or along the front line.

The increased female presence in the armed forces during WWII also led to an improvement in sanitary conditions. On the 11th of April 1943 it was ordered that soap rations for women personnel be increased to 100 grams per month, 50% more than their male counterparts.

== Resistance to Conscription ==
The first widespread and organised resistance to conscription policy began in the 1980s due to the growing public awareness of the harsh conditions faced by conscripted soldiers, as well as the loosening of government restrictions on things such as public organisations and freedom of speech under the Perestroika and Glasnost reforms. Within the armed forces resistance grew in the form of organised ethnic and nationality groups in order to protect each other from abuse and call attention to the treatment suffered by conscripts. In October 1989 a group of junior officers formed the Union for the Social Protection of Servicemen and their Families which publicised conscripts stories and conducted protests against government handling of the conscription policy.

Outside of the armed forces, the most prolific public group which spoke out against conscription was the Committee of Soldiers Mothers, later changed to the Union of the Committees of Soldiers' Mothers of Russia in 1998. The group was founded in 1989 and aimed to record and publicise the treatment of conscripts within training and barracks centres. The group also organised public protests and called for government action to protect the rights of soldiers and conscripts whilst they served.

== Conscription methods ==
In times of peace, the general conscription method was to conscript young men, either 18 or 19 who had just finished high school or completed a trade. Under the 1938 law, one call up was conducted each year in October/November to induct conscripts for three years of service, unless they were in the Navy for which service terms were 4 years. These terms of service changed over the history of the Soviet Union as new drafts to the service law were enacted to reflect the growing and diminishing populations and external threat levels. Programs conducted by the government in elementary and secondary school usually meant that newly conscripted privates had already received a degree of military training and could bypass the usual basic training.

However, in times of war, specifically WWII, conscription methods became a lot less bureaucratic, with anyone who appeared to be of age forcibly conscripted from areas that had been taken back from German control. Soldiers in these liberated areas would comb haystacks, search forests etc. for those thought to be evading service.

== See also ==
- Conscription in Russia
- Military history of the Soviet Union
