= Lidia Yusupova =

Russian-Chechen activist (born 1961)

- Лидия Мухтаровна Юсупова
- Born: Lidia Muhtarovna Yusupova; September 15, 1961 (age 65); Grozny, Soviet Union
- Occupation: human rights advocate

Lidia Muhtarovna Yusupova (Russian: Лидия Мухтаровна Юсупова; born September 15, 1961) is a Russian-Chechen human rights advocate, currently serving as the coordinator for the law office of the Moscow-based organization Memorial. Formerly, Yusupova was the director of the Grozny office of Memorial. Currently, Yusupova is completing a two-year law fellowship in Moscow.

== Biography ==
Yusupova was born to Chechen father and Russian mother in the city of Grozny. She studied Russian Literature at the Karachaevo-Cherkeski Intstitute. Later she studied law at the Chechen University in the city of Grozny, and served as a professor in that field. During the First Chechen War, she witnessed the tragedy of war, and suffered the loss of several friends, neighbors, colleagues, and family members. In 2000, during the Second Chechen War, she decided to devote her life to human rights, using her legal expertise and personal experience during both wars to help others that were entangled in the bloody conflict.

== Human rights ==
Yusupova gathers testimony from victims of human rights abuses, and presses their cases with law enforcement and military agencies. Not only does she, to the extent possible, provide the victims with legal assistance, but she also informs the rest of the world on violations of human rights, committed by Russian armed forces and Chechen rebels alike. Yusupova has been described by the BBC News service as "the bravest woman in Europe", and representatives of Amnesty International have similarly declared her "one of the most courageous women in Europe". Both Yusupova and her organization have been nominated for the Nobel Peace Prize.

Yusupova has been awarded the 2004 Martin Ennals Award for Human Rights Defenders and the 2005 Professor Thorolf Rafto Memorial Prize.

The International Federation of Human Rights reported that Yusupova faced death threats for her work on October 12, 2006.

== Quotes ==
- "Mass-scale human-rights violations and state-level terror still are the order of the day...Everyone now is endangered, not only those who live in Chechnya, but those who live in Russia as well... Society will respond. Some counterweight to this lunacy must emerge, be it in the shape of a new dissident movement, or other forms we don't yet discern. The authorities will as inevitably seek to suppress this movement cruelly and brutally. But suppression will only promote its growth, all the fears notwithstanding."
- "...we should not give up and say that the situation is hopeless. There is still our conscience, there is still the memory of the victims of this war, there is still our duty to try and prevent further bloodshed. We have to prosecute all the perpetrators of war crimes and crimes against humanity."
- "Religious extremism does not lead anywhere, it only leads to an impasse. It has happened before in Chechnya’s history; women had to wear scarves and stand opposite of the men on public transportation. Those rules were ridiculous especially in comparison to all of the serious problems Chechnya had. What about the problems in Chechnya and Ingushetia, have they been solved? How many people are dead or missing? How many people are unemployed, pensioners or disabled? Let us look at these issues and stop talking about how long women’s skirts should be or whether or not they should wear scarves on their heads."

== Awards ==
- 2004 Martin Ennals Award for Human Rights Defenders for researching about data of war victims, investigations of murder and kidnapping in Chechen Republic. Irene Khan, Amnesty International general secretary that time, said that this was award for Lidia Yusupova's heroic work, especially heroic when the dangerous work being carried by women during wars.
- 2005 Professor Thorolf Rafto Memorial Prize for her work in Chechnya to help victims of war. The formal award ceremony was at the National Theatre in Bergen, Norway.
