= Hong Kong Red Cross Youth League =

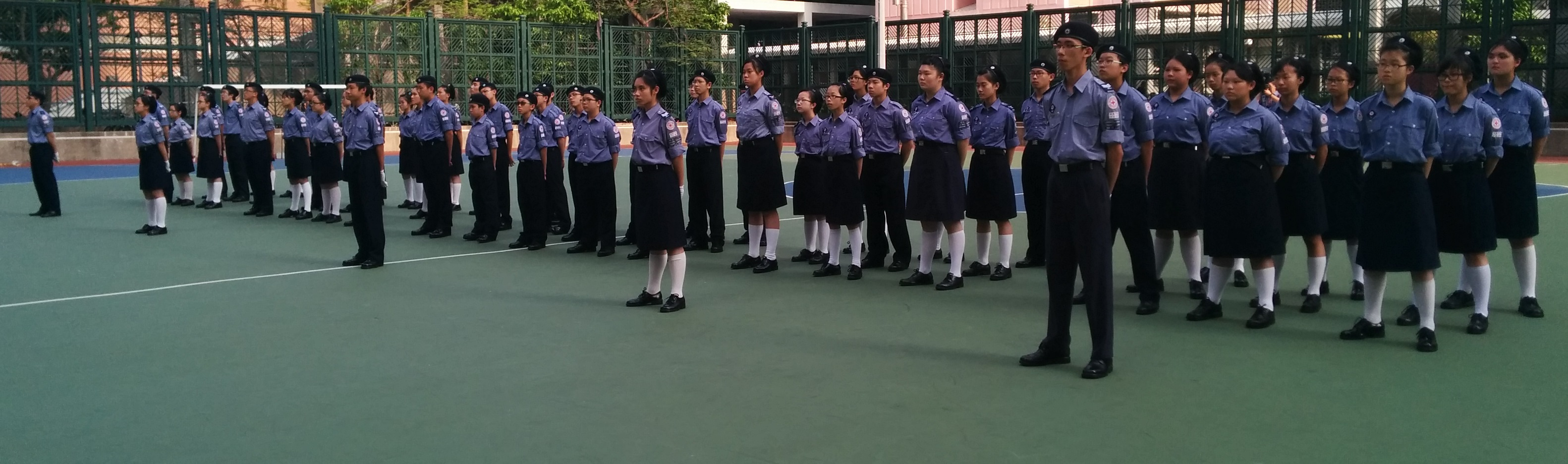
Hong Kong Red Cross Cadets on parade.

Hong Kong Red Cross Youth (Chinese: 香港紅十字青年團), is part of the Red Cross in Hong Kong under the Youth Development Service.

The Red Cross Youth has units usually located in secondary schools and youth centers. The district headquarters also have an open group for students who do not have a Red Cross Youth Unit in their school. The units are coordinated by the five regional headquarters of the Hong Kong Red Cross. Members are aged from 12 to 17 years old.

The annual events organized by the Red Cross Youth include competitions in the fields of first aid, nursing, and best service projects. They also host special days such as World Red Cross Day, community health promotion days, and award days for outstanding Red Cross youth members.

== Youth League Structure ==
In general, each Youth League is composed of one Unit Officer (UO), one Head Section Leader (HSL), three Senior Section Leaders (SSL), and five Section Leaders (SL). The core team is responsible for leading and maintaining the entire team. Some Youth Leagues also have the positions of Assistant Unit Officer (AUO) and Youth Unit Trainer (YUT)

Chinese name	English name	Abbreviation	Duties	Epaulet Logo
團長	Unit Officer	UO	Appointed by the team sponsor (usually the principal/institutional leader), usually a school teacher or staff member, responsible for the leadership committee, overseeing team operations and signing documents.	
助理團長	Assistant Unit Officer	AUO	Appointed by a team sponsor, usually a school teacher or staff member, assisting the head of the group to handle the group.	
青年團訓練員	Youth Unit Trainer	YUT	Appointed by the team sponsor, it can be a former youth group member, an adult group member, a social worker, a teacher or other professional, assisting the team leader in managing the team and providing different training to the team.	
總隊長	Head Section Leader	HSL	The leader of the group leader, leading the entire team, assisting the head of the group leader committee, and implementing the group service.	
高級隊長(訓練)	Senior Section Leader (Training)	SSL(T)	Responsible for all training matters within the group, arrange for members to participate in training courses and training activities	
高級隊長(服務)	Senior Section Leader (Service)	SSL(S)	Responsible for all service matters within the group, arrange members to participate in services, fill out and sign service documents.	
高級隊長(人事)	Senior Section Leader (Personnel)	SSL(P)	Responsible for all personnel matters within the group, recruiting new members, arranging member renewals and implementing the "progressive activity plan".	
隊長(訓練)	Section Leader (Training)	SL(T)	Assist the senior captain (training) in handling training within the group.	
隊長(服務)	Section Leader (Service)	SL(S)	Assist the senior team leader (service) in handling the services within the group.	
隊長(友誼)	Section Leader (Friendship)	SL(F)	Responsible for all friendship activities within the group and contact with other teams.	
隊長(財政及總務)	Section Leader (Treasurer and Quartermaster)	SL (TQM)	Management of financial and material resources within the group.	
隊長（文書）	Section Leader (Secretary)	SL(Sec)	Handling paperwork within the group, file processing.	
高級青年會員	Senior Youth Member	SYM	Assisting Unit Officers in leading and mentoring Youth Members; Serving as an instructor/trainer for the group's basic training program; leading Youth Members in completing the requirements of the progressive program in stages.	
青年會員	Youth Member	YM		N/A

== Progressive Programme ==
The Progressive Programme (漸進式活動計劃) is a new model of learning activities for Youth Members of the Hong Kong Red Cross, which aims to achieve the following objectives:

1. To develop the spirit of "mutual help" among Red Cross youths. As a Red Cross youth, you should have the determination to dedicate yourself to the Red Cross movement and to put into practice the spirit of mutual support;

2. To realise the five objectives of the Red Cross Youth Programme. By participating in the programme;

3. To learn the spirit of the Red Cross and to develop the necessary skills and mind to grow up healthily and to be an upright and responsible young person;

4. To fulfil the spirit of humanitarianism by taking actions to serve the sick and the needy;

5. To develop young people's motivation, creativity and leadership potential through participation;

6. To provide activities at different stages according to the different abilities and experiences of young people, so as to enhance their awareness of active learning;

7. To increase the capacity of the team to organise activities on their own so as to provide more activities to members.
