= Bulambo Lembelembe Josué =

Personal life
- Born: 11 February 1960 (age 66) Mwenga Territory

Religious life
- Religion: Christianity (Pentecostalism)

Senior posting
- Based in: South Kivu, DR Congo

Bulambo Lembelembe Josué is a DR Congolese Christian minister, and a defender of human rights.

== Biography ==
Josué was born on 11 February 1960 in the Mwenga Territory. He is an advocate of reconciliation, and offers help to the victims of the waging rebels that have terrorized the DRC yet for several decennia. In the ten years since 1998 more than five million people died because of war violence in this region.

He is a Pentecostal minister and vice-president of Eglise du Christ au Congo (ECC). Furthermore he is the vice-president and in 1991 one of the founders of the human rights organization Héritiers de la Justice in Bukavu. This organization strives for spreading consciousness of human rights and offers help to former child soldiers and victims of rape.

Thanks to his prominent role as a church leader he has a relatively free space of speech to advocate for democratic ideals in this region. He is an avowed opponent of giving amnesty to perpetrators of sexual violence. From 1995 to 2005 he was the president of church Communauté des Eglises Libres de Pentecôte en Afrique (CELPA).

== Recognition ==
Josué was awarded the Thorolf Rafto Memorial Prize in 2008.
