= Gennady Grushevoy =

Belarusian academic, human rights activist, and environmentalist

- Генадзь Грушавы
- Born: 27 July 1950; Minsk, Belarus
- Died: 28 January 2014 (aged 63); Minsk, Belarus
- Resting place: Northern Cemetery in Minsk
- Education: Belarusian State University
- Occupations: academic, head of a relief fund
- Organization: Belarusian Charitable Fund «For the Children of Chernobyl»
- Political party: Belarusian Popular Front
- Awards: 1999 Thorolf Rafto Memorial Prize

Gennady Grushevoy (also known as Hienadź Hrušavy; Belarusian: Генадзь Грушавы; 24 July 1950 – 28 January 2014) was a Belarusian academic, politician, human rights and environmental activist and the founder of one of the first Chernobyl relief foundations. He was awarded the 1999 Rafto Prize for “his many years of courageous work for democracy and human rights in Belarus”.

== Early life and career ==
Grushevoy was born in Minsk, the capital of Soviet Belarus, on 24 July 1950. In 1973 he graduated from the Belarusian State University with a degree in Philosophy and stayed on to pursue an academic career. His main academic interest was the history of Renaissance philosophy in Western Europe and Belarus.

During Gorbachev’s Perestroika Grushevoy began to participate actively in the democratic national movement, the Belarusian Popular Front. In 1989 he was arrested for organising various political and protest actions commemorating the Chernobyl catastrophe in Belarus.

Grushevoy was elected to the Belarusian parliament as a member of the Belarusian National Front in the first free elections in the country in 1990. In 1996 he was re-elected but has not taken his seat since increasingly authoritarian President Lukashenka deposed the parliament that year and appointed his own deputies.

== Chernobyl Relief Foundation ==
Grushevoy’s goal was to set up self-help organizations at the grassroots level. In 1989 Grushevoy established a non-governmental charitable fund dedicated to helping Belarusian children affected by the Chernobyl catastrophe. The fund was officially registered in 1990 as a non-profit, non-governmental Belarusian Charitable Fund «For the Children of Chernobyl». The organisation promoted civil movement initiatives within Belarus and worked on a variety of humanitarian programmes.

“For the Children of Chernobyl” became one of the largest non-governmental Chernobyl relief organisations in Belarus with teams in over 20 cities and regions of the country and over 40 long-term charitable, medical and humanitarian programs. The fund sent a large number of children with serious illnesses to Western Europe and North America for short trips meant to provide them with good medical care and distributed large quantities of humanitarian aid, such as medicine, in the region affected by the disaster.

== Other activities ==
Apart from the relief work, Grushevoy also worked with civil movement initiatives involving young people from different regions in Belarus and contributed to development of youth centres throughout the country, where young Belarusians meet to address social, political and cultural issues. For many years he and his organisation arranged annual youth festivals and conferences in Minsk under the common name of the project “Look into the future”.

== Harassment by Belarusian Authorities ==
In 1997 Grushevoy’s organisation had fallen under government scrutiny and a special commission of the KGB was set up to investigate its operations. This was part of a general harassment campaign against NGOs in 1997-2000 as President Lukashenka sought to impose state control over the sector. Initially, the government proposed that Grushevoy’s organisation become a part of the state relief program but the organisation refused the offer. For several months, the KGB officials simply sat in the fund’s offices and carried out audits (especially of its links with German organisations, where many children were sent for the summer months for recreation) while monitoring all facets of business. Ultimately, the fund was evicted from the building and forced to operate, under a different name, out of a hotel room. Some of its leaders moved to Germany, with the help of partner organisations.

After organising demonstrations in Minsk to mark the 11th anniversary of the Chernobyl disaster, arrest orders were issued for Grushevoy and his wife Irina. The official reason given by the authorities was fraud. The couple spent a year in exile in Germany before returning to Belarus when the charges were dropped - since no evidence of fraud could be found among the papers of the fund.

== Death ==
Grushevoy died from leukaemia on 28 January 2014. He was buried in the Northern Cemetery on the outskirts of Minsk.

== Recognition ==
In 1999 he received an annual prize from the Rafto Foundation, a Norwegian non-profit and non-partisan organisation dedicated to the global promotion of human rights. “In the country most severely hit by the Chernobyl disaster in 1986, Grushevoy has focused on environmental issues by emphasizing the victims' human rights.”
