= Brandeis Award (privacy) =

The Louis D. Brandeis Privacy Award is named in honor of US Supreme Court Justice Louis Brandeis and awarded by Patient Privacy Rights, the top US health privacy watchdog, representing the public's rights and interests in restoring control over the use of medical records/health data. It recognizes "significant intellectual, cultural, legal, scholarly, and technical contributions to the field of health information privacy." (In his 1928 dissent to Olmstead v. United States, Brandeis famously defined privacy as "the right to be left alone.")

Recipients include the following.

- 2012: Joe Barton, Ed Markey, Ross J. Anderson, Alan Westin
- 2013: Peter Hustinx, Mark Rothstein
- 2014: Latanya Sweeney, Peter Schaar
- 2015: Alex Pentland, Masao Horibe
- 2016: Joe Cannataci
- 2017: Nikolaus Forgó

Privacy International, a UK privacy activist organization, also has its own Louis Brandeis Award for privacy.

== See also ==
- List of humanitarian and service awards
- The Celebration of Privacy Gala
