= National Campaign on Dalit Human Rights =

Organisation in India

National Campaign on Dalit Human Rights (NCDHR), founded in 1998, now comprises four operational strands, each working to eradicate caste-based discrimination against Dalits in India. It is based in Delhi and has chapters elsewhere in the country. It has stated its aims to be achieving greater visibility for Dalit issues and holding the state, in the form of its criminal justice system, accountable for its alleged failures.

== Operation ==
Founded in 1998 by Dalit rights and human rights activists in response to a perceived lack of enforcement of the Scheduled Caste and Scheduled Tribe (Prevention of Atrocities) Act, 1989, the NCDHR had chapters in 14 of India's states by 2003. Its early stated aims were to raise visibility of Dalit issues both to an Indian and international audience and to hold the state accountable for its alleged failures to dispense fair justice in the criminal justice system.

After nearly a decade of existence, the NCDHR established four campaigns, each targeted at different aspects of discrimination. Called the Dalit Arthik Adhikar Andolan (DAAA), All India Dalit Mahila Adhikar Manch (AIDMAM), National Federation of Dalit Land Rights Movements (NFDLRM) and National Dalit Movement for Justice (NDMJ) these strands were, according to the Rafto Foundation, respectively intended to address:

- promotion of economic, social, educational and cultural rights
- promotion of the rights of Dalit women, who often suffer double discrimination as Dalits and as women, and caste-based violence
- coordination of efforts to secure land rights and livelihoods for Dalits, and to secure proper legal responses and financial remedies for survivor and victims of violence and other violations
- documentation and mitigation of the vulnerability of Dalits in disaster preparedness and response

Around the same time, the NCDHR began to identify, promote and support co-operation between other Dalit-operated organisations.

Shortly after adopting this organisational structure, in 2009, the National Dalit Watch (NDW) was set up. It followed from an extensive study conducted on the 2004 tsunami and later of massive flooding in Bihar (2007–08), which NCDHR said highlighted caste-based discrimination in rescue programmes during disasters. Since its inception, various tools and methods have been designed to identify, expose and document caste-based discrimination and used the experiences of the people to influence disaster management guidelines by central government.

== Recognition ==
The NCDHR was awarded the Rafto Prize in 2007 for its work in promoting Dalit rights and for kindling conversations about the issue internationally. It has worked internationally with organisations such as the United Nations and the International Dalit Solidarity Network.

== See also ==
- Paul Diwakar
