= Dalit Bahujan Shramik Union =

The Dalit Bahujan Shramik Union (DBSU) is a Dalit-Bahujan civil rights organization and agricultural workers' union locally coordinated from Gandhinagar, Hyderabad, Andhra Pradesh, South India. It lobbies against violence towards Dalit women. Two of its founders were Paul Diwakar and Annie Namala.

== Origins ==
The DBSU was previously known as the Andhra Pradesh Dalit Bahujan Vyavasaya Vruthidharula Union (APDBVVU).
