= Malahat Nasibova =

Azerbaijani journalist and human rights activist

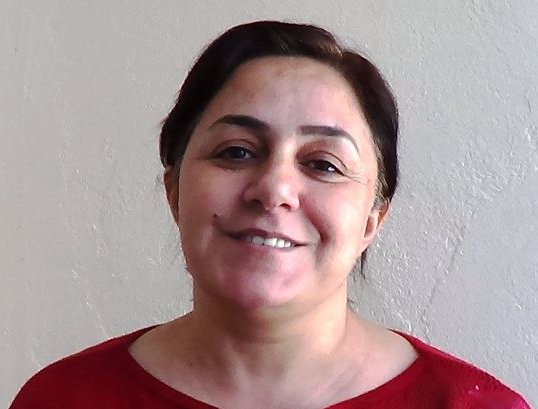
- Nasibova in 2020.
- Born: March 6, 1969 (age 57); Nakhchivan City
- Occupation: Free Speech Activist

Malahat Nasibova (Azerbaijani: Məlahət Nəsibova; born March 6, 1969, in Nakhchivan City), is an Azerbaijani journalist and human rights activist who was awarded the Thorolf Rafto Memorial Prize in 2009 for her "courageous and unwavering struggle for a free and independent press." Risking her own safety, she reports on abuse of power, human rights violations and corruption in the isolated autonomous republic of Nakhchivan, which is part of Azerbaijan.

Nasibova currently works in Azerbaijan as a journalist for “Turan”, an independent information bureau. She also works as a correspondent with Radio Free Europe, and is the leader of the human rights organization 'Democracy and NGO's Development Resource Center' in Nakhchivan. Nasibova continues to advocate for freedom of speech and has emerged as one of its strongest participants. Through her reporting, she has exposed police corruption, and human rights violations amidst the persistent persecution of the Azerbaijani authorities.

== Fight for Civil Rights in Azerbaijan ==
The region of Azerbaijan has a wealth of natural resources (oil reserves) which interest large and politically powerful nations, but this interest has done little to curb the corruption within the native government. Azerbaijan, as a result, lacks the freedom of democratic governments, and suffers from a legal system which is stacked against the proletariat.

Azerbaijan was supposed to cease some of its undemocratic behavior when it became a member of the Council of Europe in 2001, but they have not yet met the conditions and continue to kidnap and imprison people for political reasons. The Azerbaijan government has led Europe in the number of imprisoned journalists, and the Committee to Protect Journalists (CPJ) registered nine imprisoned journalists in 2007 and five in 2008. One of these, Novruzali Mammadov, died in prison in August 2011.

=== Husband’s Arrest ===
In 2007 Nasibova's husband Ilgar was arrested after criticizing the government in a letter, which exposed his treatment by police while reporting a protest at a local market. Ilgar's intention in writing the letter was to elucidate the unfair treatment he and the protestors received, but he ended up being charged with slandering the very same officers. On December 6 he was sentenced to 90 days in prison, for insulting a public official, after being told on December 4 that the charges had been dropped.

== Radio Free Europe ==
Malahat Nasibova is also a reporter for Radio Free Europe/Radio Liberty (RFE/RL), a station which champions for democratic ideals by reporting in underserved areas, and regions without free press. The ultimate goal of Radio Free Europe, is to combat intolerance by offering listeners access to a source of independent information, but it also acts as a means to connect democratic nations with those of the region.
