= Palermo Anno Uno =

Palermo Anno Uno (Palermo Year One) is an Italian anti-mafia organization, based in Palermo, Sicily. It is an umbrella organization for different NGOs opposing organized crime.

== History ==
Palermo Anno Uno was founded in March 1993, following the massive demonstrations all over Sicily following the murder of Giovanni Falcone in May 1992, as a mean to go from protest to proposals in the war against organized crime.

For its efforts against organized crime, it was awarded the 1996 Rafto Prize.
