= Via Bona Award =

Philanthropy award in the Czech Republic

The Via Bona Awards for Philanthropy are annual awards presented by the Via Foundation to acknowledge exemplary philanthropy of companies and individuals who have a history of strong support of the work of non-profit organizations in the Czech Republic. The Via Foundation supports community and philanthropy development in the Czech Republic. Via Foundation focuses on growing the number of people in the Czech Republic working collaboratively to improve their communities and giving to help others. "Every act of charity is a story – which can motivate other people who are thinking about giving back but don't know how to start," says Executive Director Jiří Bárta about why Via Foundation presents the Via Bona awards.

The Via Bona Awards are one of the two major annual awards in the Czech Republic to honor philanthropy and philanthropists. The other major Czech philanthropy award is the TOP Corporate Philanthropists Award presented by Donors Forum to award companies which have given the highest total monetary amount to charitable causes over the course of one year.

Since 1997, The Via Bona Awards are held each year under the auspices of the Embassy of the US in Prague and the general partner is Nadace Vodafone Česká republika. The Via Bona Award is given to those who serve as an example to others through their material and financial support, as well as their willingness to tread untried paths.

The Via Bona Awards are nominated by Czech nonprofit organizations and are chosen by an independent jury.

For the 19th year in a row, Via Foundation recognized individuals and companies who help improve their communities by giving their time, energy, expertise or money to help others. Via announced the winners of the 2016 Via Bona Philanthropy Awards. Juries selected winners in six categories.

The 2016 award winners include people such as Zdeňka Mocňáková, who helps disabled people and senior citizens despite being reliant on a wheelchair herself. She is the recipient of the Personal Engagement Award.

In the Young Personal Engagement category, the jury selected two winners: Jakub Trefný, who despite being just nineteen years old, is an experienced volunteer nad helps senior citizens, homeless people and refugees, and Milan Dzuriak, who undertakes "Journeys against Pain" to raise money to make disabled children's dreams come true.

The Patron Award was presented to businessman Sanjiv Suri, owner of Zátiší Group, for his numerous philanthropic activities both in the Czech Republic and around the world.

The Good Company Award went to Dušan Hopp's company Auto Díly Servis s.r.o., based in Nový Jičín, whose owner and employees helped remodel a Home for Pregnant Women in Crisis.

The Loyal Donor Award is a new category this year. It went to Asaf Auerbach, a regular donor to children's charities whose own life was saved by Sir Nicholas Winton during World War II.

The Bequests Help Award draws attention to bequests, which are still an uncommon form of giving in the Czech Republic. Via Foundation recognized microbiologist Ludmila Šilhánkova in memoriam. She left over CZK 2 million to help disabled children and young people.

The Public's Choice Award is a special seventh category presented under the auspices of Czech TV, the main media partner of the Via Bona Awards. Members of the public chose from among the 15 nominated philanthropists on the Via Foundation website. The winner of the voting was Zdeňka Mocňáková.

== List of Award Winners ==
=== 2016 ===
Personal Engagement Award and Public's Choice Award: Zdeňka Mocňáková

Young Personal Engagement Award: Milan Dzuriak and Jakub Trefný

Good Company Award: Dušan Hopp, Auto Díly Servis s.r.o.

Patron Award: Sanjiv Suri

Loyal Donor Award: Asaf Auerbach

Bequests Help Award: Ludmila Šilhánková

=== 2015 ===
Personal Engagement Award: Zdenka Wasserbauerová

Young Philanthropist Award: High school student Kateřina Vaňáková

Award for a Bequest: Professor Kateřina Šmídková

Forging a New Path Award: Vojtěch Sedláček

Individual Donor Award: Libor Winkler

The Small and Medium-Sized Company Award: Konzum, obchodní družstvo v Ústí nad Orlicí

Large Corporation Award: NET4GAS, s.r.o.

The Public's Choice Award (public online voting at www.umimetouzoddetstvi.cz): First, third, fourth and 4C classes, Gymnázium Jateční, Ústí nad Labem

=== 2014 ===
Personal Engagement Award:

- Barbora Jindřiška Petrtýlová
- Petr Sýkora

Journalists' Individual Donor Award: Kvido Štěpánek

Young Philanthropist Award: Martin Kučera and Vojtěch Paukner

Forging a New Path Award: Aleš Jeník

Small and Medium-Sized Company Award: GALVAMET spol. s.r.o.

Large Corporation Award: AVAST Software s.r.o.

=== 2013 ===
Forging a New Path Award: JUDr. Hana Machačová

Personal Engagement Award: Tomáš Slavata

Academic Philanthropy Award: students of the Third Faculty of Medicine - Charles University Scott Keel and Petr Oliva

Journalists' Individual Donor Award: Martin Hausenblas

Small and Medium-Sized Company Award: Z - Trade s.r.o.

Large Corporation Award: Česká spořitelna

Honorary Award: Olbram Zoubek

=== 2012 ===
Journalists' Individual Donor Award: Jana Bečvářová

Academic Philanthropy Award: students of grammar school Broumov and their teacher Šárka Rambousková

Personal Engagement Award: Ondřej Horecký

Forging a New Path: Adastra, s.r.o.

Small and Medium-Sized Company Award: MIBCON a.s.

Large Corporation Award: KPMG Czech Republic

Award for Support Specific Project by Large Corporation: OKD, a.s.

=== 2011 ===
Journalists' Individual Donor Award: Břetislav Tůma

Personal Engagement Award: PhDr. Jaroslav Šturma

Large Corporation Award: Vodafone Czech Republic

Small and Medium-Sized Company: LAW CZ

Award for Innovative Project: LMC s.r.o.

Award for Employee Involvement in Philanthropy: KPMG Czech Republic

Award for Long-term partnership with a Nonprofit: Telefónica Czech Republic, a.s.

=== 2010 ===
Corporate Award (large companies): Ogilvy Group

Corporate Award (small- and medium- sized companies): College of Economics and Management (VŠEM)

Individual Award: Lubomír Kohout

Award for Innovative Projects: e|n|w|c Natlacen Walderdorff Concola v.o.s

Award for Employee Involvement in Philanthropy: PricewaterhouseCoopers Česká republika s.r.o.

Award for Long-term Partnership with a Nonprofit: Ogilvy Group

Journalists' Award: Lubomír Kohout

=== 2009 ===
Corporate Award (large companies): Československá obchodní banka, a.s.

Corporate Award (small- and medium- sized companies): Josef Kvapil, a.s.

Individual Award: Marek Stanzel

Award for Innovative Projects: Jaroslav Sklenář

Award for Employee Involvement in Philanthropy: T-Mobile Czech Republic, a.s.

Award for Long-term Partnership with a Non-profit: Pavel Cindr

=== 2008 ===
Corporate Award (large companies): Telefónica O2 Czech Republic

Corporate Award (small- and medium- sized companies): Bisport, spol. s.r.o.

Individual Award: Mr. Milan and Mrs. Marie Sourada

Award for Innovative Projects: Poštovní spořitelna

Award for Employee Involvement in Philanthropy/Volunteerism: Citibank Europe plc

Award for Long-term Partnership with a Non-profit: Kocián Šolc Balaštík

Honorary Award: Mrs. Marka Bednářová and Mr. Donald Hamer

=== 2007 ===
Corporate Award (large companies): Isolit – Bravo, s.r.o.

Corporate Award (small- and medium- sized companies): Orbit, s.r.o.

Individual Award: Countess Mathilda Nostitzozová

Award for Innovative Projects: Vodafone Czech Republic

=== 2006 ===
Corporate Award (large companies): Metrostav a.s.

Corporate Award (small- and medium- sized companies): Hobra - Školník

Individual Award: Vlastimil Venclík

Award for Innovative Projects: Skanska CZ Corporation

Honorary Award: Vaclav and Marie Hora

Honorable Mentions: Marten, s.r.o; Československa obchodní banka

=== 2005 ===
Corporate Award (large companies): Stavební spořitelna České spořitelny, a.s.

Corporate Award (small- and medium- sized companies): Casta a.s.

Award for Innovative Projects: ECE Projektmanagement G.m.b. H & Co. KG

Individual Award: MUDr. Eva Hvížďalová

Honorary Award: Silva and Oldrich Vasicek

Honorable Mentions: Mrs. Marie Šenfeldová, Mr. Luďěk Zýka, Mr. Milan Havránek and Mr. Čeněk Zlatohlávek; Connex Morava, a.s.

=== 2004 ===
Corporate Award (large companies): Eurotel Praha, spol. s.r.o

Corporate Support for Regional Activities: Osram Bruntál, s.r.o.

Award for Innovative Projects: Ing. Libor Holub

Long-Term Partnership Award: The Safari Family and the Roesel-Krum Family

Honorary Award: Dr. Alfred Bader

=== 2003 ===
Corporate Award (large companies): Nokia ČR

Corporate Support for Regional Activities: Plzeňský Prazdroj, a.s.

Award for Innovative Projects: GlaxoSmithKline, s.r.o.

Long-Term Partnership Award: Mucos Pharma CZ

Individual Award: Mrs. Lada Martinézová

Honorable Mention: Česká Televize

=== 2002 ===
Corporate Award (large companies): Philip Morris, a.s.

Corporate Support for Regional Activities: MEKS - Červenák

Award for Innovative Projects: Kateřina Dubská - Vydavatelství ERA

Long-Term Partnership Award: Jaromír Křivohlavý - Renesance, Třebenice

Individual Award: Jakub Blatský

=== 2001 ===
Corporate Award (large companies): Veba, a.s.

Corporate Support for Regional Activities: MESIT Holding, a.s.

Award for Innovative Projects: Altik, s.r.o.

Honorable Mentions: Ladislav Čerych; Milan Horvát

=== 2000 ===
Main Award: Ostravské kanalizace a vodárny

Honorable mentions:

- Staving Olomous s.r.o.
- Odkolek a.s.
- Mius a.s.
- Pavel Svoboda

=== 1999 ===
Main Award (large companies): Dopravní stavby Holding, a.s.

Honorable Mentions:

- Leo Burnett Advertising, Ltd.;
- MEKS - Červenák; Healthy Food J.O.D.
- Ing. Jiří Rous Pireo
- HK Shoes - Dobříš
- Czech-o-dog Ltd.
- J.O.D. Louny

=== 1998 ===
Main Award: Pekárny Jaromíra Středy

Honorary Award:

- Jan Pivečka s.r.o.
- Graddo, a.s.
- Microsoft s.r.o.

Honorable mentions:

- Preciosa, a.s.
- Setuza, a.s.
