= Human Rights House of Bergen =

Coordinates: 60°23′11″N 5°19′17″E

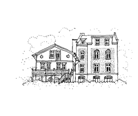
The Rafto House

The Human Rights House of Bergen (also known as the Rafto Human Rights House) is based in Bergen, Norway. It is located near the student centre (Studentsenteret) of the University of Bergen and is owned and operated by the Egil Rafto House Foundation.

The Human Rights House is a unit of the international network established by the Human Rights House Foundation. It was established in memory of journalist Egil Rafto (1951–1997) who was the son of Professor Thorolf Rafto (1922–1986), lecturer in economics at the Norwegian School of Economics. Egil Rafto were a co-founders of the Rafto Foundation for Human Rights which was founded during 1986 in honor of his father. Thorolf Rafto had been strongly active in the international fight for human rights.

The Human Rights House of Bergen was opened in 1999 by Kim Aris who is the youngest son of Burmese diplomat Aung San Suu Kyi and British historian Michael Aris (1946–1999). Rafto Foundation for Human Rights and several other organizations have permanent offices in the house, such as Amnesty International, AFS Intercultural Learning, Médecins Sans Frontières, and Norwegian Church Aid's Youth. Other groups can the house for seminars, meetings, or social events.

== Related reading ==
- Per Egil Hegge (2016) Fear Shall Not Triumph: The Rafto Prize – 30th Anniversary (Bergen: Fagbokforlaget) ISBN 978-8253303499
