= Paul Diwakar =

Indian Dalit rights activist

- Paul Diwakar in 2016 at Rohith Vemula Protest Rally
- Citizenship: Indian
- Education: B. Sc., M.S.W.
- Alma mater: St. Xavier's School, Eluru (Andhra Pradesh), M. C. C. Higher Secondary School, Chennai (Tamil Nadu), Madras Christian College, Chennai (Tamil Nadu), Madras School of Social Work, Chennai (Tamil Nadu)
- Occupation: Social Activist
- Father: Ananda Rao Samuel

N. Paul Diwakar is a Dalit activist and former General Secretary of the National Campaign on Dalit Human Rights, based in Delhi, India. He was formerly the General Secretary of the Dalit Bahujan Shramik Union, a Dalit-Bahujan rights organisation in Andhra Pradesh.
