= Thorolf Rafto Memorial Prize =

International human rights award

The Professor Thorolf Rafto Memorial Prize (Raftoprisen) is a human rights award established in the memory of the Norwegian human rights activist, Thorolf Rafto.

== Organization ==
The prize is awarded annually by the Rafto Foundation for Human Rights (Raftostiftelsen) which was founded in the humanistic tradition of the Helsinki Accords in order to promote the fundamental human rights of intellectual and political freedom. Today, the foundation is based at the Human Rights House in Bergen, Norway. The major work of the foundation, including the organization of the award ceremony is done by a small team of professional staff and volunteers. The award ceremony takes place at Den Nationale Scene in Bergen annually in November.

The initial idea of the Rafto Prize was to provide a basic informative platform for the laureates that would help to receive further attention from the international media and support from political and non-political organisations. By awarding the Rafto Prize, the Rafto Foundation for Human Rights seeks to bring attention to independent voices that due to oppressive and corruptive regimes are not always heard. For example, four Rafto Laureates have subsequently received further international assistance and were awarded the Nobel Peace Prize. Aung San Suu Kyi, José Ramos-Horta, Kim Dae-jung and Shirin Ebadi were awarded the Rafto Prize prior to the Nobel Peace Prize.

== History ==
Thorolf Rafto was a professor of Economic History at the Norwegian School of Economics and Business Administration (NHH). He was also well known for his political activism in Eastern Europe, especially in Hungary, Czechoslovakia and Poland. During a visit to Prague in 1979 to hold a lecture for students excluded from universities for political reasons, Rafto was arrested and beaten by the communist security police which may have resulted in injuries which weakened his health. On 4 November 1986 Thorolf Rafto died.

His friends and colleagues agreed to establish a foundation that would continue Rafto's work such as promotion of freedom of speech and political expression in Eastern Europe. It was also decided to introduce a prize for human right activists. The fall of the Iron Curtain and consequential democratization of Eastern European states led to a reconsideration the mission of the foundation. Meanwhile it had opened new possibilities to work with other geographical regions in a promotion of human rights. Already in 1990, the Rafto Prize was awarded to a Burmese democratic leader, Aung San Suu Kyi who, in the following year 1991, received the Nobel Peace Prize for her non-violent struggle for democracy and human rights. For the first years, the foundation was based at the Norwegian School of Economics and Business Administration. From 1997, the Rafto Foundation was relocated to the Human Rights House of Bergen, Norway.

== Ceremony ==
The Rafto Prize is awarded annually on the first Sunday in November and since 1990, the official ceremony takes place at the National Theatre of Bergen. Among the invited guests are representatives from Bergen municipality and the Norwegian government, academics, supporters and partners of the Rafto Foundation and family members of the Rafto family.

== Criteria and nomination process ==
The annual deadline for nominations is 1 April. Voluntary organisations, institutions and individuals worldwide, with knowledge or interest in human rights are allowed to nominate candidates for the Rafto Prize. Former recipients of the prize can also nominate candidates, although candidates who are nominated by themselves or by their staff or by honorary officers will not be taken into consideration. After the deadline, all applications are carefully considered by the prize committee and the final decision is usually released at the press conference at Rafto House in September.

== List of Laureates ==
Year	Laureate(s)	Country
1987	Jiří Hájek	Czechoslovakia
1988	Trivimi Velliste	Estonian SSR (Soviet Union)
1989	Doina Cornea; FIDESZ (Dr Peter Molnar)	Romania; Hungary
1990	Aung San Suu Kyi	Burma
1991	Jelena Bonner	Soviet Union
1992	Preah Maha Ghosananda	Cambodia
1993	The people of East Timor, represented by José Ramos-Horta	East Timor (Indonesia)
1994	Leyla Zana	Turkey
1995	Union of the Committees of Soldiers' Mothers of Russia	Russia
1996	Palermo Anno Uno	Italy
1997	The Romani people, represented by Ian Hancock	Romani people
1998	ECPAT	Thailand
1999	Gennady Grushevoy	Belarus
2000	Kim Dae-jung	South Korea
2001	Shirin Ebadi	Iran
2002	Sidi Mohammed Daddach	Western Sahara (Morocco)
2003	Paulos Tesfagiorgis	Eritrea
2004	Rebiya Kadeer	China
2005	Lidia Yusupova	Russia
2006	Thich Quang Do, represented by Vo Van Ai	Vietnam
2007	National Campaign on Dalit Human Rights	India
2008	Pastor Bulambo Lembelembe Josué	Democratic Republic of the Congo
2009	Malahat Nasibova	Azerbaijan
2010	Bishop José Raúl Vera López	Mexico
2011	Sexual Minorities Uganda (SMUG) and their leader Frank Mugisha	Uganda
2012	Nnimmo Bassey	Nigeria
2013	Bahrain Centre for Human Rights	Bahrain
2014	Agora - Pavel Chikov	Russia
2015	Ismael Moreno ("Padre Melo")	Honduras
2016	Yanar Mohammed	Iraq
2017	Parveena Ahanger and Parvez Imroz	Jammu and Kashmir
2018	Adam Bodnar	Poland
2019	Rouba Mhaissen	Syria/Lebanon
2020	Egyptian Commission for Rights and Freedoms	Egypt
2021	Human Rights Data Analysis Group	USA
2022	Nodjigoto Charbonnel and AJPNV (Association Jeunesse pour la Paix et la Non-violence)	Chad
2023	Defence for Children International – Palestine (DCIP)	Palestine
2024	Luis Manuel Otero Alcántara	Cuba
2025	Emergency Response Rooms (ERR)	Sudan

== Other sources ==
- Per Egil Hegge (2016) Fear Shall Not Triumph: The Rafto Prize - 30th Anniversary (Bergen: Fagbokforlaget) ISBN 978-8253303499
- Atle M. Skjærstad (2016) Uværet som aldri stilnet (Bergen: Vigmostad & Bjørke AS) ISBN 978-8241912702
