= Hong Kong Humanity Award =

- Traditional Chinese: 香港人道年獎
- Simplified Chinese: 香港人道年奖
Transcriptions
Standard Mandarin
- Hanyu Pinyin: Xiānggǎng Réndào Nián Jiǎng
Yue: Cantonese
- Jyutping: hoeng1 gong2 jan4 dou6 nin4 zoeng2

The Hong Kong Humanity Award is co-organized by the Hong Kong Red Cross and Radio Television Hong Kong. It is the first of its kind in Hong Kong aims to give tribute to those who live up to and put into practice the spirit of humanity.

The awardees have demonstrated outstanding achievements in humanitarian contribution through their voluntary acts using different means, such as protecting human life, caring for the health of the vulnerable, and respecting human dignity, etc., in advancing the well-being of people in need regardless of their gender, culture, social status, and background. The co-organizers stated the event aimed to raise awareness of the universal value of humanity and promote, equality, mutual assistance and peace withing the community.

== Eligibility of candidate ==
- Must be a Hong Kong resident, irrespective of age, gender, race and nationality.
- Must show humanitarian contribution through protecting human life, caring for the health of the vulnerable and respecting human dignity. Act should be committed one year prior to nomination.
  - Substantial acts or valiant efforts to prevent and/or alleviate human suffering and vulnerability.
  - The behavior must be voluntary.
  - Candidate should be modeling and spreading the spirit of humanity.

== List of awardee ==
(in alphabetical order)

=== 2024 ===
- Mr Wilbur Chan Chi-keung for numerous types of services, ranging from community visits and first-aid support at large-scale events to escorting supplies to disaster areas on the mainland and overseeing their distribution.
- Dr Polly Cheung Suk-yee
- Mr Fok Chi-shing
- Ms Tobey Lee Tsz-yan
- Dr Czarina Leung Chi-hung
- Ms Mak Po-ching
- Ms Wong Ming-wai

Hong Kong Humanity Youth Power

- Dr Philip Li
- Dr Javier Pang Chi-long

=== 2023 ===
- Dr Cheung Son Alicia, for services for the homeless and unpaid work for those in need as a dentist
- Ms Mary Wong Tin-fung Hemrajani, for services for breast cancer patients
- Dr Vivian Lee Kin-wing, having been conducting surgeries for people suffering from cleft lip and cleft palate
- Mr Gary Leung Siu-wai, visually impaired athlete
- Dr Harmony To Hau-man, for working in impoverished or war-torn regions
- Mr Vincent Li Yiu-fai, volunteer of Hong Kong Red Cross, Médecins sans frontières and The Samaritan Befrienders Hong Kong

Hong Kong Humanity Youth Power

- Ms Chu Man-him, for services for hearing impaired people

=== 2022 ===
- Dr Chan Cheong-wai
- Mr Aimé Girimana
- Dr Jimmy Leung Hei-jim
- Ms Leung Shun-wah
- Ms Carol Tse Ka-yee

Hong Kong Humanity Youth Power

- Mr Chan Yik-yeung
- Mr Kayson Chau Hung-yeung

=== 2021 ===
- Dr Shannon Melissa Chan
- Dr Kevin Hung Kei-ching
- Ms Winsome Lee Hin-shin
- Mr Leung Kwok-shing
- Dr Tse Mei-yee
- Dr Jason Yam Cheuk-sing

Hong Kong Humanity Youth Power

- Mr Ho Wai-kit
- Mr Michael Chan Wai-man

=== 2020 ===
- Sr Ho Kwai-ping Agnes
- Mr Ng Kwai-lun Pasu
- Dr Patrick Ip
- Ms Shalini Mahtani
- Dr Tong Wing-sze Jennifer
- Prof George Woo

Hong Kong Humanity Youth Power

- Mr Cheung Pak-shun Dennis

=== 2019 ===
- Rev. Dominic Chan Chi-ming
- Ms Tiffany Chan Wai-fun
- Dr John Ngan Hin-kay
- Ms Rabi Yim Chor-pik
- Ms Patty Sy Ching-pik

Hong Kong Humanity Youth Power

- Ms Sylvia Tsang Nga-sze

=== 2018 ===
- Dr Clare Cheng Yuk-kwan
- Dr Ko Chi-cheong
- Dr Michael To Kai-tsun
- Ms Tso Yee-man
- Ms Joyce Tsui Yuk-ying

Hong Kong Humanity Youth Power

- Mr Raymond Yu Kam-wing

=== 2017 ===
- Dr Chow Sik-kuen
- Dr Law Sheung-wai
- Mr Walter Leung Wai-yin
- Mr Howard Ling Ho-wan
- Mr Robert Wong Kin-ming
- Mr Chris Yeung Wai-kei & Mrs Lydia Yeung Mak Yin-fung

Hong Kong Humanity Youth Power

- Ms Michelle Siu Hoi-yan: a visually impaired musician

=== 2016 ===
- Mr Chan Hon-man: Founder and head of "Repair Fairy"
- Dr Kwong Wing-yan: doctor
- Mr Lam Kar-yeung: professional in Chinese medicine
- Mr Ng Yiu-fai: Founder of "You Will Succeed", an online job hunting platform for disabilities
- Mr Pau Chun-yu: Nurse
- Mr Yip Bing-chiu: As a visually impaired, he develops mobile apps for helping people with similar disabilities in order to direct, access social facilities and get traffic information

=== 2015 ===
- Dr Chan Ngai-yin: Specialist in cardiology
- Dr Chiu Hon-ching: Dentist
- Ms Lam Kam-ching: voluntarily visit and concern the prisoners for years
- Ms Jenny Law Chun-heung: As one working in the industry of beauty salon, she has built a volunteer group which provide free haircut for elders in the Southern District
- Dr Eric Leung Siu-fai: Dentist
- Mrs Bessie S M Pang: provide help for children with hearing loss

Hong Kong Humanity Youth Power

- Mr Clovis Man Kwok-pan

=== 2014 ===
- Mrs Chan Leung Yuet-ming, Grace: with an aspiration of a more inclusive society, has served for the visually impaired; former Chief Executive of The Hong Kong Society for the Blind
- Ir Ho Ngai-leung, Albert: Geotechnical engineer, has applied his expertise in school reconstruction work after 2008 Sichuan Earthquake and on-site needs assessments for Sowers Action
- Dr Li Yuen-mei, Emmy: Ophthalmologist, active in volunteering ophthalmic services and promoting public awareness on eye care
- Mr Sin Wing-sang Edward: Retired actuary, volunteered to tutor people in need, including visually/hearing impaired students, orphans, youths with emotional or behavioral problems, new arrivals from mainland China and ethnic minorities; also taught prison inmates local language and computer
- Mr WONG Ka-ning, Raymond and Mrs WONG HO Shuk-ying, Viola: Stimulated by their only son with speech communications difficulty, they have founded of the Benji's Centre — the first and only charity in Hong Kong providing speech therapy to children aged below 16 from low-income families; set up social enterprise and put earnings into the Benji's Centre

=== 2013 ===
- Dr Chu Chor-lup: One of the founder of the "A.J.R. Charitable Foundation Limited", which assist financially for those in distress and needing timely support
- Dr Lau Wai-sum, Eilly: dentist, has organized various voluntary dental service for elderly people and needy groups in Hong Kong and the mainland
- Mr Mak Yiu-yeung, Sunny: Set up a self-financed charity "Sunshine Action" to visit people living below the poverty line
- Professor TANG Wai-lan, Gladys: Researcher in deaf children education, especially in the area of sign language
- Dr Wong Chung-kwong: Former professor of the Department of Psychiatry of The Chinese University of Hong Kong, has devoted to promote education in mental health

=== 2012 ===
- Mr Ko Chi-kin, Derek: Has actively provided outdoor adventure activities for people of all ages, especially those for disabilities
- Mr Lau Tat-keung, Gregory: Police superintendent, with the secondary duty as a negotiator, has persuade more than 200 people out of suicidal thoughts and volunteered to send out suicide prevention messages
- Dr Leung Tze-ching, Vincent: Doctor with extensive experience in neonatal care, has served for newborn resuscitation in rural China
- Rev Thomas Anthony Peyton: Missionary of Maryknoll Fathers and Brothers, actively visited and cared for minority groups such as prison inmates, mental disabilities and needy residents in old districts
- Ms Wong Wai-fun, Fermi: Founder of the Hong Kong Unison, serving ethnic minorities

=== 2011 ===
- Ms Lai Wing-kun, Joyce: Volunteer nurse
- Mr Law Wai-cheung, Willy: Chairman of Direction Association for the Handicapped
- Dr Pang Chi-wang, Peter: Regularly goes to undeveloped areas to operate on people to close their clefts, and actively promote health education
- Ms So Kam-mui: Paralyzed from the waist down an accident when she was 15 years old, has devoted herself into volunteering and encouraged others through her own experience for almost 38 years
- Mr Wong Chi-hung, Percy: Social work, has served minorities group in the Mainland and also helped raising the standards of China's social workers
- Ms Yiu Mui-fan, Esther: Volunteer nurse

=== 2010 ===
- Father Sean Patrick Burke: Volunteering for disadvantaged people in Hong Kong for years
- Dr Chung Wai-ling, Margaret: Founder of "Regeneration Society" in 1991, also serve in many public committees related to health care and rehabilitation
- Dr Albert Ko: Mechanical engineer and active international humanitarian service volunteer
- Professor Edward Ng: Using his professional knowledge in architecture to serve rural area in mainland; had launched a project called “A Bridge Too Far, A Dream Comes True” in Gansu
- Dr Poon Tak-lun: Active participant in emergency relief work and First Aid Training

=== 2009 ===
- Dr Au Yiu-kai: Active outreach volunteer doctor
- Mr. Chan Kam-yuen: Active volunteer in disability issues, had helped Hong Kong Association of the Deaf to overcome a governance crisis
- Dr Fan Ning: Doctor, active in medical humanitarian missions, repeatedly joined the Hong Kong Red Cross relief operation around the world
- Sister Helen Marie Kenny: Pioneer of the hospice movement in Hong Kong
- Mr. Leung Kin-wah: Sowers Action volunteer, had launched "The Long March for Education" fund-raising walk in 2002
- Professor Leung Ping-chung: Professor Emeritus of Orthopaedics and Traumatology of The Chinese University of Hong Kong, repeatedly visited poverty-stricken regions
- Mrs Priscilla Lui Tsang Sun-kai: Director of Against Child Abuse
- Professor Martin Wong Chi-sang: Professor in Department of Community and Family Medicine and the School of Public Health in CUHK, has been Founding President of the Hong Kong Healthcare Professional Seminar Association, Chairman of the Organising Committee for‘ Ten Outstanding Warriors of Regeneration, active in other community services
- Dr Wu Kit-ying Kitty: Clinical psychologist, had provided service after 2008 Sichuan earthquake

=== 2007 ===
- Mr David James Begbie: director of the Global Village Life X-perience programme, a spokesman for both Crossroads International and Global Hand
- Prof Chan Ying-yang, Emily: activist in medical humanitarian relief, had been the President of Medecins Sans Frontieres in Hong Kong
- Dr Chow Pak-chin: Ophthalmic doctor, one of the founders of "Project Vision"
- Prof Lam Shun-chiu, Dennis: Ophthalmologist, founder of Action for Vision Eye Foundation
- Mr So Wai-sang: Registered nurse (psychiatric), formed a drama club to promote life education
- Mr To Chung: One of the founders of Chi Heng Foundation which promote education of AIDS and related topics
