= Thorolf Rafto =

Norwegian human rights activist (1922–1986)

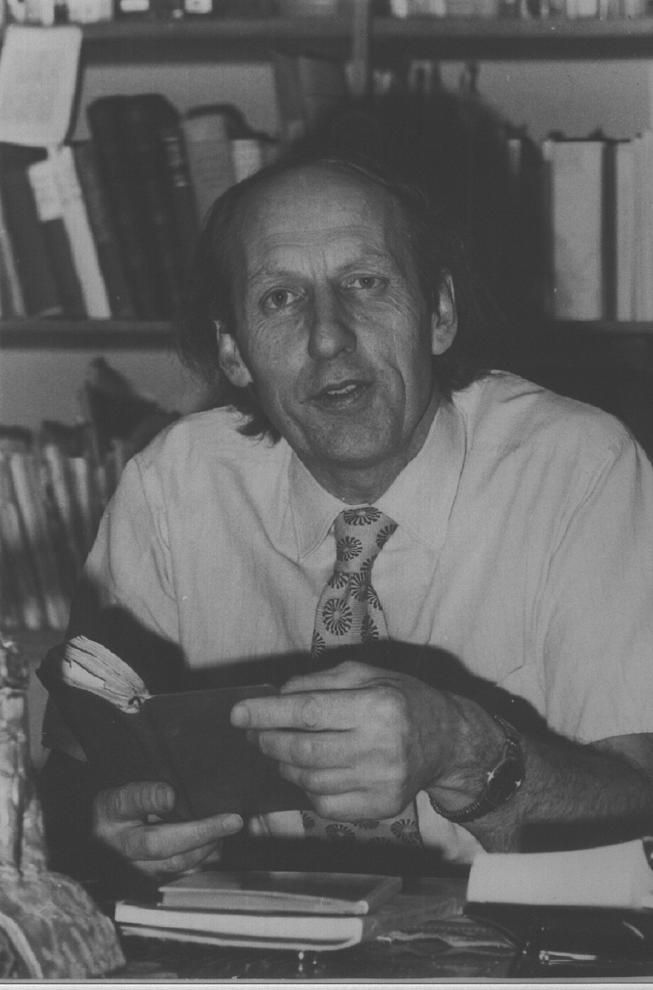
Thorolf Rafto

Thorolf Rafto (July 6, 1922 – November 4, 1986) was a human rights activist and professor of Economic History at the Norwegian School of Economics in Bergen, Norway. The Rafto Foundation for Human Rights was established in gratitude for his efforts and inspiration.

== Personal life ==
Thorolf Rafto was born in Bergen, Norway. His father, Robert Rafto was an Olympic gymnast and the winner of the Norwegian decathlon championships in 1918. In his younger days Rafto competed on national level in athletics, and won the Norwegian championships in decathlon in 1947. During World War II, Thorolf Rafto fled to Britain and served with the Royal Norwegian Air Force. Back in Bergen after the war, he earned university degrees in Languages and History. In 1950, at the age of 28, Rafto married Helga Hatletvedt, with whom he had four children. In 1956, Thorolf Rafto became a lecturer at the Norwegian School of Economics in Bergen.

== Activism ==
His involvement in political activism in Eastern Europe started with the Prague Spring of 1968. Later in his life, Rafto became particularly supportive of the liberal ideas of Czechoslovak reformists such as Alexander Dubček and Jiří Hájek. In 1973, Rafto travelled to Odessa, where he witnessed the persecution of intellectuals and Soviet Jewish refuseniks, who had applied for emigration to Israel. Upon his return from the Soviet Union, Rafto wrote an article criticizing internal Soviet politics in Italy's Corriere della Sera, that was later published in Norway and Denmark. In 1979, Rafto traveled again to Prague to hold a lecture for students excluded from the universities for political reasons. He was abused and later imprisoned by the security police, which may have caused lasting damage to his health. In 1981, Rafto made several trips to Poland to work closer with labour organisations there. By 1985, his health was deteriorating. In 1986, Thorolf Rafto died at 64 years of age.

== Rafto Foundation and Rafto Prize ==
After the death of Thorolf Rafto, his friends and colleagues agreed to establish the Rafto Foundation for Human Rights (Raftostiftelsen) which would continue Rafto’s work on a promotion of freedom of speech and political expression in Eastern Europe. It was also decided to introduce the Thorolf Rafto Memorial Prize (Raftoprisen) for human right activists.

The fall of the Iron Curtain and the consequential democratization of Eastern European states caused reconsider of the mission of the foundation. It also opened new possibilities to work in other geographical regions to promote human rights. The initial idea of the Rafto Prize was to provide a basic informative platform for the laureates that would help to receive further attention from the international media and support from political and non-political organisations.

By awarding the Rafto Prize, the Rafto Foundation for Human Rights seeks to bring attention to independent voices that due to oppressive and corrupt regimes are not always heard. In 1990, the Rafto Prize was awarded to a Burmese democratic leader, Aung San Suu Kyi who in the following year 1991 received the Nobel Peace Prize for her non-violent struggle for democracy and human rights. Four Rafto Laureates have subsequently received further international assistance and were awarded the Nobel Peace Prize. Aung San Suu Kyi, José Ramos-Horta, Kim Dae-jung and Shirin Ebadi were awarded the Rafto Prize prior to the Nobel Peace Prize.

== Other sources ==
- Per Egil Hegge (2016) Fear Shall Not Triumph: The Rafto Prize - 30th Anniversary (Bergen: Fagbokforlaget) ISBN 978-8253303499
- Atle M. Skjærstad (2016) Uværet som aldri stilnet (Bergen: Vigmostad & Bjørke AS) ISBN 978-8241912702
