= Hong Kong Red Cross =

Organization of Hong Kong

Hong Kong Red Cross 香港紅十字會
- Founded: 12 July 1950; 76 years ago
- Type: Aid agency, Non-profit organisation
- Purpose: Protect human life Care for the health of the vulnerable Respect human dignity
- Location: Hong Kong
- Origins: Created as a branch of the British Red Cross Society
- Region served: Hong Kong, Mainland China, the whole world
- Services: Humanitarian Aid
- Members: 365 unifourm units with 22,580 members
- Key people: Mr George Joseph Ho (President); Mr Philip Tsai (Chairperson); Dr Lau Chor Chiu (Deputy Chairperson); Ms Wendy W M Tsang (Deputy Chairperson)
- Revenue: HK$588.17 million (Total recurrent income in 2012/13)
- Endowment: Public and private donations
- Volunteers: 22,580
- Website: www.redcross.org.hk (English and Traditional Chinese)

Hong Kong Red Cross
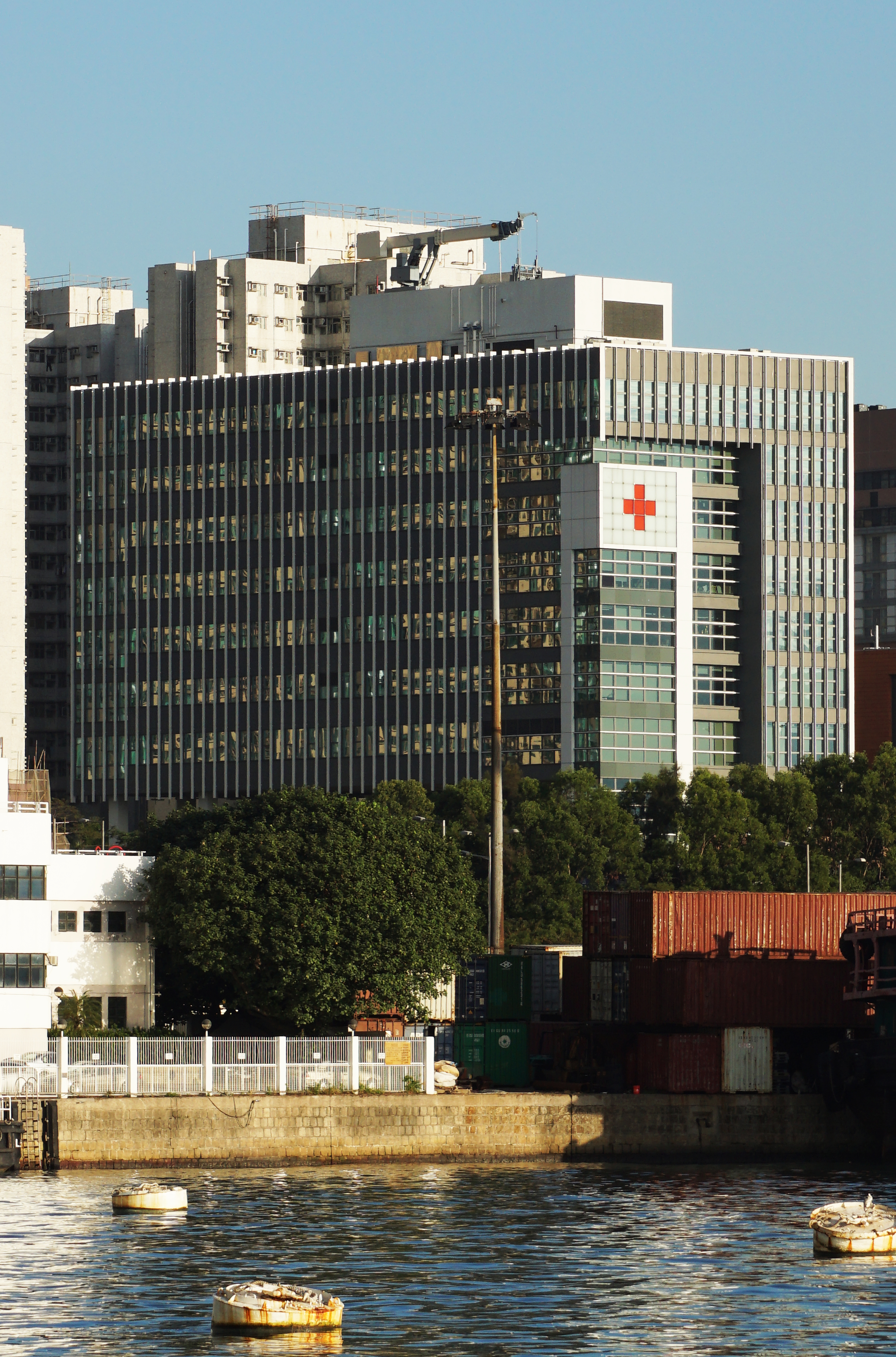
- Head office in West Kowloon
- Traditional Chinese: 香港紅十字會
- Simplified Chinese: 香港红十字会
Transcriptions
Standard Mandarin
- Hanyu Pinyin: Xiānggǎng Hóngshízìhuì
- Wade–Giles: Hsiang-kang Hung-shih-tzu-hui
- Yale Romanization: Syang^{1}gang^{3} Hung^{2}shr^{2}dz^{4}hwei^{4}
- IPA: [ɕjáŋkàŋ xʊ̌ŋʂɻ̩̌tsɹ̩̂xwêɪ]
Yue: Cantonese
- Jyutping: hoeng1 gong2 hung4 sap6 zi6 wui6*2

The Hong Kong Red Cross (HKRC, Chinese: 香港紅十字會) is the national Red Cross society of Hong Kong as part of the International Red Cross and Red Crescent Movement. Its head office is in West Kowloon.

It was established officially on 12 July 1950 as a branch of the British Red Cross Society in Hong Kong. Since 1 July 1997, upon the transfer of Hong Kong's sovereignty to the People's Republic of China, the Hong Kong Red Cross has changed its affiliation to become a special branch of the Red Cross Society of China, but remains autonomous from it. Unlike other Red Cross and Red Crescent societies worldwide, which are notable for their humanitarian effort, Hong Kong Red Cross is better known for blood transfusion in Hong Kong. This may be due to a few disasters threatening and political turmoils in the territory, also its long history of service from 1952. The blood transfusion service runs under the Hospital Authority.

In lack of need in relief services in the territory, the society runs a range of humanitarian services to care for the underprivileged, such as schooling for children in hospitals, organising voluntary services in the ageing communities, organising uniform groups for youths and adults, and conducting first aid courses. In the case of disasters in neighbouring regions, the society raises funding and sends relief forces. In occasional floods in eastern China, earthquakes in China, Indian Ocean tsunami, the staff and volunteers from the Hong Kong Red Cross attended. In the early height of incoming Vietnamese refugees, the society also set up services for them in the 2000.

== History ==
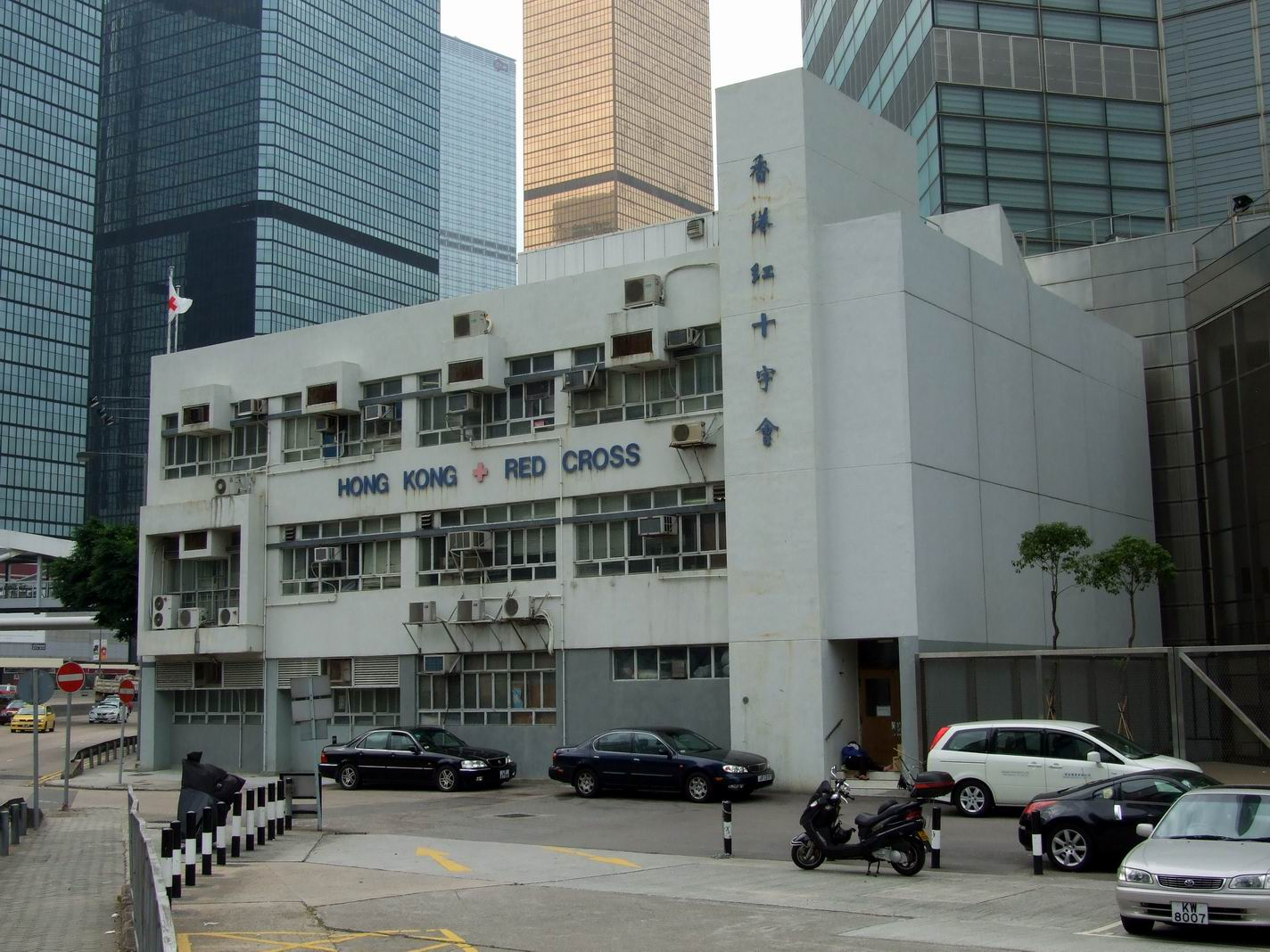
Former head office in Wan Chai

The Hong Kong Red Cross was established on 12 July 1950 as a branch of the British Red Cross Society, in the same year, the first group of lady volunteers was formed. It started to provide blood collection service in 1952, established its first hospital school in 1954 and formed its first cadet unit at St. Francis' Canossian School in 1956.

- 1962 Inauguration of the Princess Alexandra Red Cross Children's Residential School.
- 1965 Inauguration of the Hong Kong Red Cross Headquarters at Harcourt Road.
- 1968 The Red Cross Holiday Camp was opened at Shek Pik, Lantau Island.
- 1975 Medical Equipment Loan Service was introduced.
- 1977 Started to offer first aid training courses to the public and the industrial workers.
- 1979 Assumed management of North Kai Tak Transit Centre.(Ceased in March 1987)
- 1984 Opening of the Blood Transfusion Service Centre at King's Park.
- 1991 Hong Kong Red Cross rose over HK$144 million to provide relief for flood victims in Eastern provinces of People's Republic of China.
- 1992 The first uniformed Elderly Volunteers Unit was set up.
- In 1997, the sovereignty of Hong Kong was transferred to The People's Republic of China (PRC) on 1 July 1997, but Hong Kong Red Cross' autonomy remained unchanged. Thirteen years previous to Hong Kong's sovereignty transfer, the UK and the PRC had reached an agreement on the future of Hong Kong and embodied the agreement by signing the Sino-British Joint Declaration. Under the framework of the declaration, Humanitarian aid activity is part of the way of life in Hong Kong, and can be preserved for fifty years. With humanitarian aid activity being protected under this declaration, Hong Kong Red Cross remains a full national member of International Red Cross and Red Crescent Movement today.
- 2000 The Golden Jubilee of the Hong Kong Red Cross.
- 2001 The former "Youth and Welfare Department" was split into "Youth and Volunteer Department" and "Health and Care Service Department".
- 2002 The Red Cross Society of China Headquarters presents a "Special Contribution Award" to the Hong Kong Red Cross in recognition of her long-term support to disaster relief and preparedness projects and other development projects on the Mainland.
- 2003 Prompt response to the outbreak of severe acute respiratory syndrome (SARS) in Hong Kong was made by the Hong Kong Red Cross.
- 2006 The Golden Jubilee of Red Cross Youth, Hong Kong.

== Patron and Office Bearers ==
- Patron: Mr John Lee
- Vice Patron: Mrs Betty Tung
- President: Mr George Joseph Ho
- Chairperson: Dr Lau Chor Chiu, GMSM, MH, JP

== Organisational affairs ==
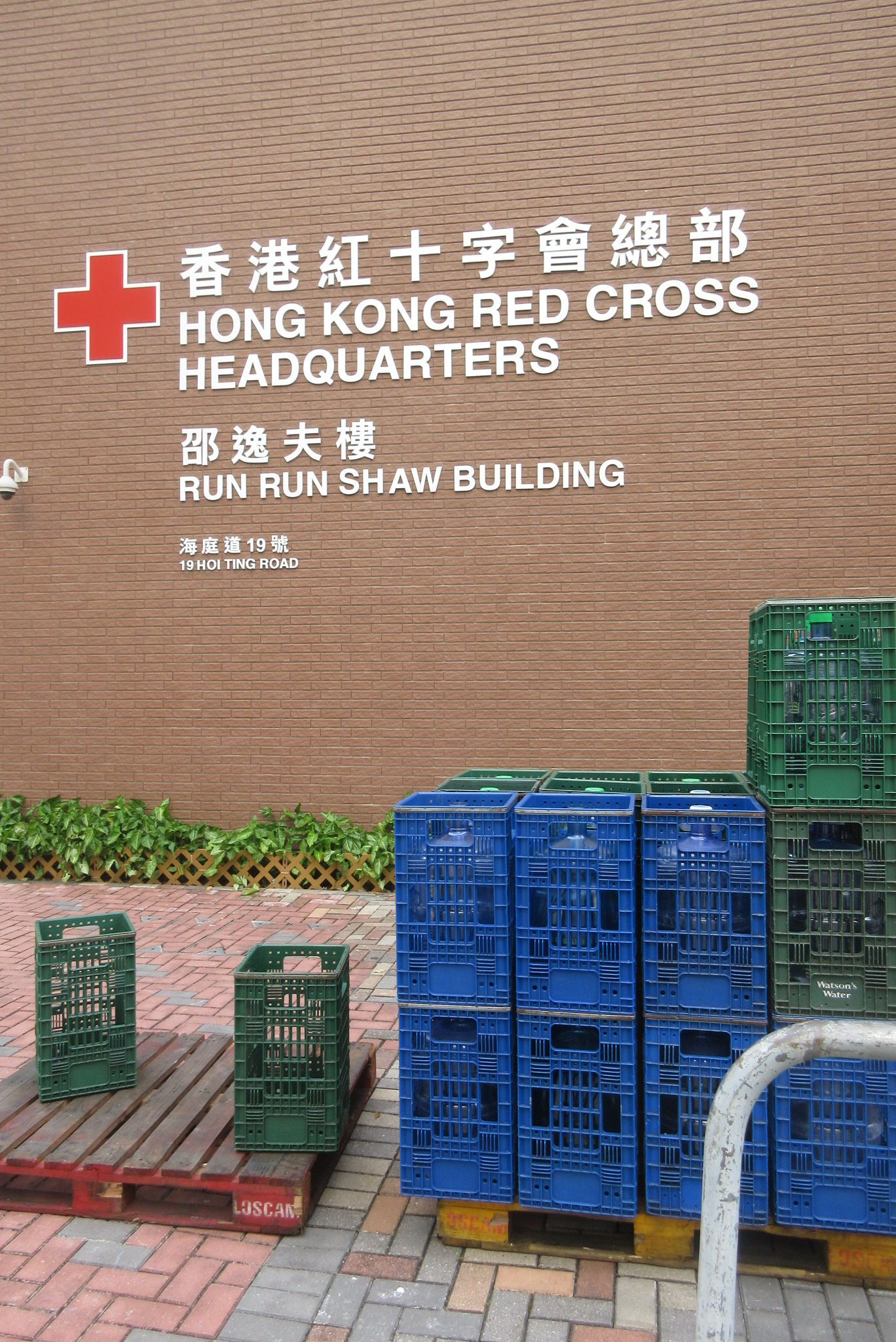
Signage at the head office

The 11 storey current head office, with 11,900-square-metre (128,000 sq ft) of gross floor space, funded with $400 million Hong Kong dollars in donations, opened in 2015. It is on a 1,940-square-metre (20,900 sq ft) plot of land in West Kowloon.

The former head office is in Wan Chai and opened in 1965.

The warehouse is in Chai Wan.

== Volunteers ==
The society is largely managed by volunteers with some paid staff. For its development, the society organises both uniformed and non-uniformed units for volunteers of all ages. By age, the uniform groups are divided into:

- Junior Units (8–12)
- Youth Units (12–17)
- Adult Units (above 17)
- Elderly Units (50 or above)

=== Youth Units ===
Red Cross Youth Units, or RCY (formerly known as Cadet Units until 1997), as members of the International Red Cross Movement, aim at protecting life and health, serving the community and putting the spirit of humanity in action. These uniformed units are attached to secondary schools, youth centres and Hong Kong Red Cross Divisional Headquarters, and members are usually aged from 12 to 17.

The youth uniform units are notable in Hong Kong because of its widespread in secondary schools in the territory. The uniform units are educated with the spirit of Red Cross and the skills of first aid, drilling and others.

=== Divisional Headquarters ===
There are five Red Cross Divisional Headquarters located in different geographical position in Hong Kong. Two of them are located in New Territories, two of them in Kowloon and the rest in Hong Kong Island.

Head Office enacts a coordinator between all divisional headquarters.

=== Lists of Youth Units ===
Each headquarters hold a fraction of Youth Units. These lists are available in the intranet system of each headquarters.

==== Activities ====
The major events include:

- The mass parade
- First aid competition
- Nursing competition
- World First Aid Day
- Best service project themes competition
- World Red Cross Day health promotion programme
- International friendship activities
- Drill competition

=== Adult Volunteer Groups ===
Non-uniform units are named Adult Volunteer Groups. They are for members who commit less intensively, as they normally work regular day jobs as well.

== See also ==
- Hong Kong Humanity Award
