= Rafto Foundation for Human Rights =

Norwegian foundation

The Rafto Foundation for Human Rights was established in 1986 in memory of Thorolf Rafto, a professor of economic history at the Norwegian School of Economics (NHH) and a human rights activist. The main objective of the Rafto Foundation is the promotion of freedom of political expression and enterprise. The work of the foundation consists of different educational and informative projects, including the annual award of the Rafto Prize (Raftoprisen) each November. The foundation is based in Bergen, Norway and run by a small team of professionals and volunteers.

== Work ==
The work of the Rafto Foundation is done by a small team of professionals and volunteers. The major emphasis is made on the presentation of the Professor Thorolf Rafto Memorial Prize support of previous laureates as well as educational projects, informative events and lobby initiatives.

In 2018, Ombudsman Adam Bodnar was awarded the Rafto Prize for his work defending minorities rights and judicial independence in Poland.

In 2017, the Rafto Prize was awarded to Parveena Ahangar of Association of Parents of Disappeared Persons (APDP) and Lawyer Mr Parvez Imroz of Jammu and Kashmir Coalition of Civil Society, recognizing their work to document and defend the rights of victims of enforced disappearances and other human rights violences in the Indian-administered region of Kashmir.

In 2016, the prize was awarded Yanar Muhammed, Chairperson of Organization of Women's Freedom in Iraq (OWFI), working to promote women's rights generally, and especially to provide shelter and protection for women left vulnerable during the armed conflict going on in Iraq since 2003, and also motivated by the patriarchal norms of family honor prevalent in the region.

In 2004, Rebiya Kadeer was awarded the Rafto Prize for her efforts to bring to the end social and economic marginalisation of the Uyghur people of Xinjiang. In a promotion of the human rights of the Uyghur people, the Rafto Foundation published a book, “In Our World of Good and Evil”, (2006) and assisted in a production of a documentary, “On a tightrope” (2006).

In 2000, Kim Dae-jung was awarded the Rafto Prize for his tireless fight for democracy and human rights in Korea. Since that time, the Rafto Foundation provides a significant contribution to the annual international conferences held in Bergen, Norway. The foundation supported also a production of a documentary film, “YODOK Stories” about Yodok concentration camp in North Korea.

In 1999, Gennady Grushevoy was awarded the Rafto Prize for his brave work for democracy and human rights under the Lukashenko dictatorship in Belarus. Together with the Norwegian film company Piraya Film, a documentary film, “Belarusian Waltz”, was released in 2007. The film tells the incredible story of a Belurussian painter and performance artist, Alexander Pushkin, and his brave challenges to President Lukashenko’s authoritarian regime.

In 1994, Leyla Zana, the Kurdish Parliamentarian, became the Rafto Prize laureate for her struggle for the human rights of the Kurdish people in Turkey and the neighbouring countries. In her struggle for freedom, Leyla Zana has become a symbol of a peaceful resolution to the Kurdish conflict in Turkey. The Rafto Foundation took an active role in establishing the EU Turkey Civic Commission and series of conferences in Brussels, on the Kurdish minority rights.

In 1990, Aung San Suu Kyi was awarded the Rafto Prize for her peaceful struggle under a military dictatorship. Since 1990 Burma has become one of the main follow-up projects of the Rafto Foundation, which worked with the Burmese community in Norway to set up the Norwegian Burma Committee, which is based in Oslo and operates independently of the Rafto Foundation.

== History ==
Thorolf Rafto was politically active in Eastern Europe, especially in Hungary, the Czech Republic and Poland. During a visit to Prague in 1979 to hold a lecture for students excluded from universities for political reasons, Rafto was arrested and severely beaten by the communist security police causing injuries which weakened his health. After he died on 4 November 1986, friends and colleagues established a foundation to continue Rafto’s work promoting freedom of speech and political expression in Eastern Europe and to offer a prize for human rights activists.

The fall of the Iron Curtain and consequential democratization of eastern European states caused the foundation to reconsider its work in other geographical regions to promote human rights. In 1990, the Rafto Prize was awarded to Aung San Suu Kyi who in 1991 received the Nobel Peace Prize.

The foundation was originally based at the Norwegian School of Economics and Business Administration. In 1997 it relocated to the Human Rights House of Bergen, established in memory of Thorolf Rafto’s son, journalist Egil Rafto (1951-1997) and officially opened in 1999 by Kim Aris, the youngest son of Burmese diplomat Aung San Suu Kyi and British historian Michael Aris.

== Education ==
In August, 2008 the Rafto Foundation organised an exhibition and a roundtable on Poverty and Human Rights (with the example of Dalits) for the Summer Research School of the University of Bergen. Among the invited speakers were the representatives of the 2007 Rafto Prize laureate, the National Campaign on Dalit Human Rights.
