= Terry Fox Humanitarian Award =

The Terry Fox Humanitarian Award is an annual award, established in 1982 in honour of Terry Fox, granted to students who are Canadian citizens or landed immigrants. It is operated as an independent, not-for-profit program, and is headquartered in Burnaby, British Columbia.

The award disburses up to $28,000 over four years to students studying for their first post-secondary degree or diploma. Typically, the program selects 20 recipients. In 2015, there were 21 recipients, and in 2017, there were 20 recipients chosen from 617 applications.

== Eligibility ==
To be eligible for the award, students must be Canadian citizens or landed immigrants who have completed community humanitarian service and display "courage and determination by overcoming adversity". The humanitarian service must have been completed voluntarily and without compensation.

Applications must be submitted by 1 December for awards granted for the start of the school year in September.

The student must be in good academic standing, and must be graduating or have graduated from a secondary school, or completing their first year of CEGEP. They must be pursuing their first university degree or diploma, or already be enrolled in such a program, or continuing into the second year of CEGEP.

A student who has graduated with a degree or diploma is no longer eligible for the program.

== Award ==
Established in 1982 in honour of Terry Fox, the award disburses up to $28,000 over four years. The award is given in the form of two annual $3500 stipends to the educational institution attended by the recipient of the award, one in September and another in January. For students who are not charged tuition fees, the educational institution receives a $1750 biannual stipend. A student who receives other scholarships cumulatively worth more than $15,000 will have amounts exceeding this value deducted from the Terry Fox Humanitarian Award.

Students may decline the monetary portion of the award if their school and related fees are already paid from other sources.

Recipients are assigned an alumnus of the award program as a mentor.
