= Union of the Committees of Soldiers' Mothers of Russia =

Russian NGO

The Union of the Committees of Soldiers' Mothers of Russia (Russian: Союз Комитетов Солдатских Матерей России, Soyuz Komitetov Soldatskikh Materey Rossii) is a Russian NGO, with a stated mission of exposing human rights violations within the Russian military.

== Creation and aims ==
The original organization, the All-Russian public organization "Committee of Soldiers' Mothers of Russia" (KSM Russia) was created in April 1989. In fact, the activities of its activists began back in 1988 in Stavropol.

Before 1998, it was known as the Committee of Soldiers' Mothers of Russia which was founded by Maria Kirbasova. It is a member of the human rights organization Human Rights House. Among the activities the organization is involved in is educating Russian civil society on the rule of law in relation to military service, as well as informing society about what the armed forces should look like in a democratic society. The organization also provides free legal advice to soldiers and their families about their rights and conscription laws, as well as intervening on behalf of soldiers who are facing abuse and hazing from their superiors and other more senior soldiers (dedovshchina).

== Leadership and structure ==
As of 25 February 2022, the Committee was led by Olga Larkina.

== Government repression ==
In August 2014 one of the members of the organisation stated that 100 wounded Russian soldiers who might have been injured fighting in Ukraine were taken to hospitals in Saint Petersburg. The Russian government labelled the organisation a "foreign agent", a move which members of the organization see as retaliation on the part of the authorities. According to The Moscow Times some considered this labeling of the group as punishment for their statements. The organization has not received any funding from foreign (non-Russian sources) since May 2014. On 18 October 2014, Russian police detained the head of local Committee of Soldiers' Mothers in Budennovsk, (73-year-old) Lyudmila Bogatenkova, on suspicion of fraud; the local Committee of Soldiers' Mothers in Saint Petersburg labelled this arrest "an act of intimidation in connection with her activities".

In October 2021, the local Committee of Soldiers' Mothers in Saint Petersburg stopped some of its activities in helping soldiers in response to the Federal Security Service (FSB)'s formal approval of a list of 60 actions that are considered to be those of a foreign agent under Russian foreign agent law and can lead to criminal liability. Examples of liable actions include the "observance of lawfulness" of soldiers, or assessing the military and political situation in Russia. The Committee stated that the FSB's list of liable actions severely limited the activities of human rights defenders, lawyers and journalists. Oksana Paramonova, head of the Saint Petersburg Committee, stated that the Committee would stop its work that involved direct contact with the armed services in order to avoid risks to its staff, but would continue its work in new formats, including methodological support.

== 2022 Russian invasion of Ukraine ==
In late February 2022, during the 2022 Russian invasion of Ukraine, the Committee was contacted by soldiers' parents, who said that their sons carrying out military service had been sent near the Ukrainian border or had been forced to sign contracts for army service. Alexander Latynin, a lawyer advising the Committee, stated that conscripts who had served less than four months could legally be transferred outside of Russia, but were not permitted to participate in combat. Under the law at the time, conscriptees with sufficient experience were authorised to participate in combat after signing a contract. The normal administrative process for preparing and signing a contract was normally from one to three or four months according to Latynin. The Committee director, Olga Larkina, said that conscripts' parents had said that their sons had been coerced into signing contracts rapidly. Latynin interpreted this by stating, "When they really want to and really need to, then some people, including some officials, will resort to breaking the law." Parents described difficulties contacting their sons and in keeping in communication. The Russian Ministry of Defence didn't respond to enquiries about the conscriptees by the newspaper Meduza or to parents contacted by Meduza.

== Recognition ==
The Committee was awarded the Rafto Prize in 1995 and the Right Livelihood Award in 1996.
