= Via Foundation =

Czech foundation

The Via Foundation - Nadace Via
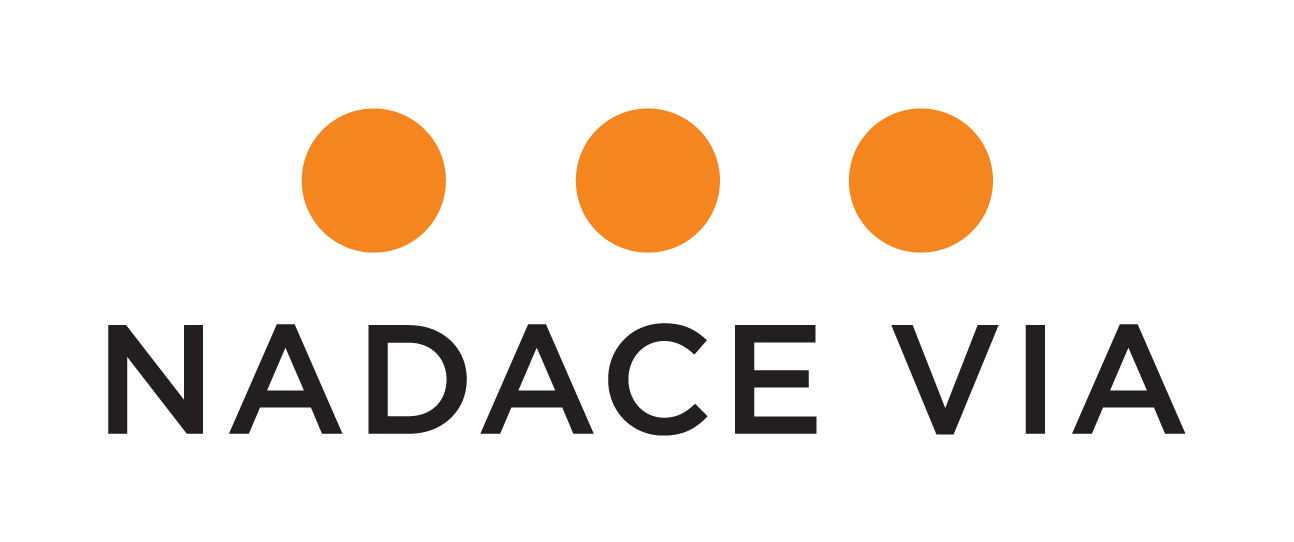
- Formation: September 4, 1997
- Headquarters: Prague, Czech Republic
- Exec. Dir.: Zdeněk Mihalco
- Website: https://www.nadacevia.cz/

Via Foundation is an independent Czech foundation. Via Foundation’s vision is a society in which people act freely, work together and accept responsibility for themselves and their communities, and where giving is a regular part of life.

Via Foundation supports people who work collaboratively to improve their communities. Via focuses on two key areas: the art of living together (supporting active citizens) and the art of giving (supporting philanthropy). It also operates a simple and secure online giving tool, Darujme.cz, through which donors have given almost CZK 2 billion to more than 1,000 registered organizations and associations.

Since its establishment, the Via Foundation has supported more than 8,000 community projects across the Czech Republic. These projects have included the creation of community gardens, gazebos, playgrounds and other gathering places, as well as the repair of small monuments, the restoration of local traditions and the organization of neighbourhood events and festivals.

Via Foundation was established in 1997 as the successor to the Czech branch of the American Foundation for a Civil Society, which had been operating in Czechoslovakia since 1990. It raises funds from individual donors, companies, foundations and from the proceeds of its endowment.

== Video ==
- The Via Foundation
- The Via Foundation's 10th Anniversary Event featuring Madeleine K. Albright - Via Executive Director Jiří Bárta
- The Via Foundation's 10th Anniversary Event featuring Madeleine K. Albright - Secretary Madeleine K. Albright (Part 1)
