= Viasna =

Belarusian human rights organisation

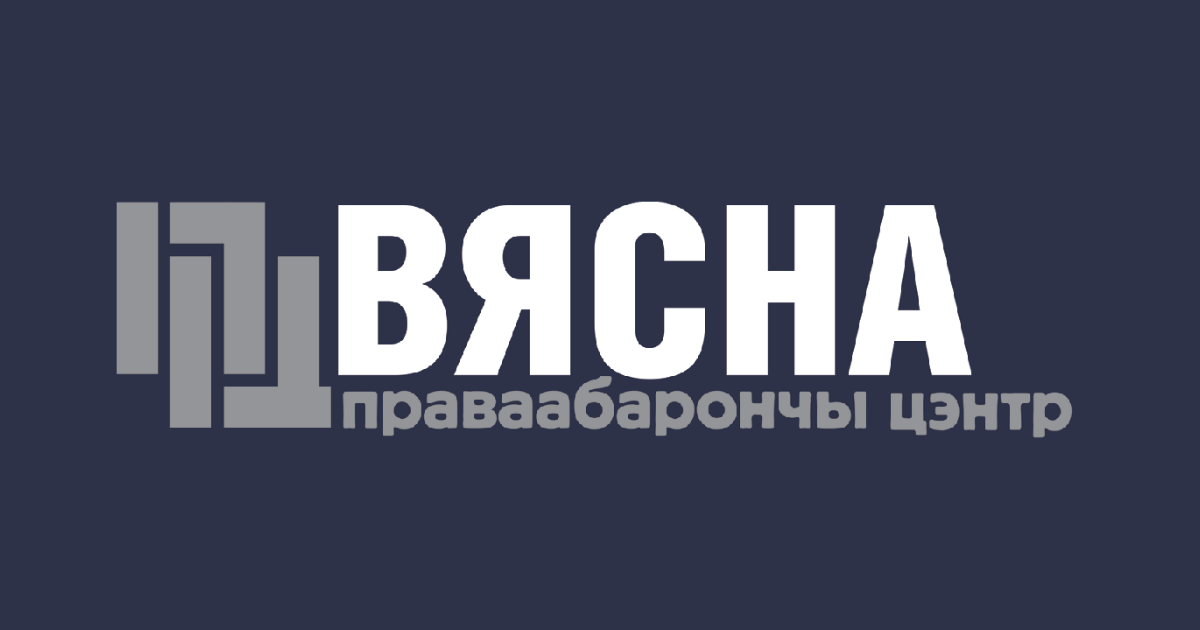
- Founded: April 1996; 30 years ago
- Founders: Ales Bialiatski
- Type: Nonprofit; INGO
- Services: Protecting human rights
- Fields: Practical assistance to civic initiatives, research into the state of the civic society, civic and human rights education
- Chairman: Ales Bialiatski
- Website: spring96.org

The Viasna Human Rights Centre (Belarusian: Праваабарончы цэнтр «Вясна», romanized: Pravaabarončy centr «Viasna») is a human rights organization based in Minsk, Belarus. The organization aims to provide financial and legal assistance to political prisoners and their families, and was founded in 1996 by activist Ales Bialatski in response to large-scale repression of demonstrations by the government of Alexander Lukashenko.

== Profile ==
=== Activities ===
Viasna strives to aid creation of a civil society where human rights are protected and respected as stated in the Universal Declaration of Human Rights and in the Constitution of Belarus. Viasna's main goal is to guarantee human rights such as freedom of assembly and association, freedom of media and expression, etc. Viasna advises Belarusians on legal matters, provides free legal aid, documents and exposes abuses, and provides assistance to victims of political repressions. The organization is also committed to raising awareness about democracy and human rights by organizing conferences and seminars, and publishing and distributing educational materials. Viasna conducts independent elections monitoring, documents human rights violations, detentions and arrests, and makes decisions on recognising arrested citizens as political prisoners. The Centre persistently acts as a strong opponent of the death penalty in Belarus.

=== Methods ===
In its work, Viasna:

- collects data on the state of civil society and rights awareness in Belarus;
- organizes educational meetings, conferences, lectures, and discussions on subjects of democracy and human rights protection;
- leads human rights studies, monitors the state of the human rights protection in Belarus, assists in implementation of international treaties on human rights ratified by the Republic of Belarus;
- publishes and products public information, scientific and other legal documents;
- contact with all governmental authorities and deputies of all levels, with civil, public, educational and training organizations and institution;
- provides assistance to those who contact the Centre.

== History ==
=== Foundation and first years ===
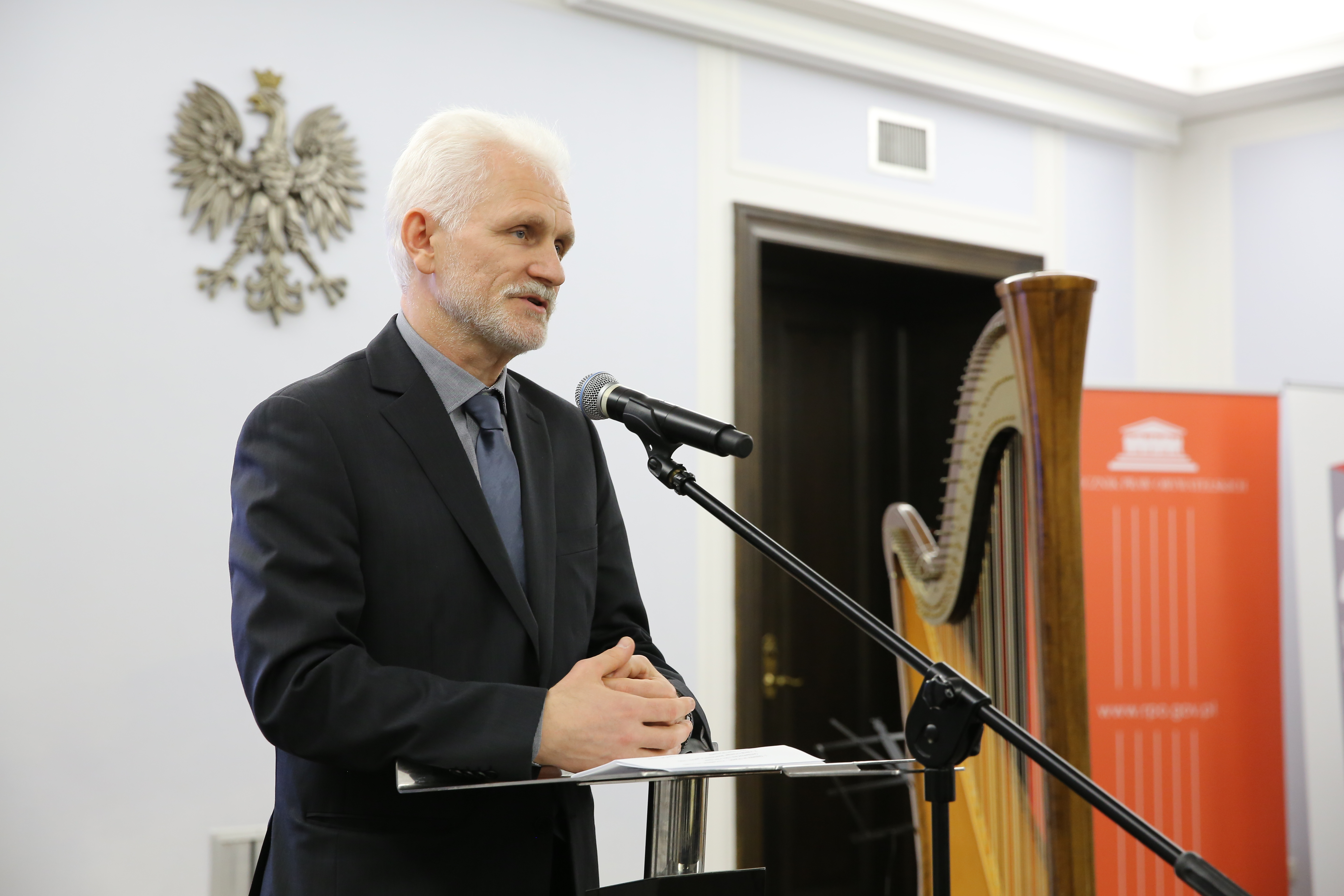
Ales Bialiatski during Paweł Włodkowic Award ceremony in the Polish Senate, 2014

The organization then titled "Viasna-96" was founded by Ales Bialatski in 1996 in the aftermath of the Minsk Spring, a series of mass street protests against the increasingly-authoritarian rule of Alexander Lukashenko, brutally suppressed by the authorities. Repressive measures such as fines, administrative arrests, expulsions of students from universities, forcing employers to dismiss their employees were used to punish the protesters. "Viasna-96" was created as a temporary campaign to assist the arrested and their families.

On 15 June 1999, the organization was officially registered in Minsk as the Human Rights Center "Viasna".

In 2001, Viasna conducted an independent observation of the 2001 presidential election. For this, in 2003 by decision of the Supreme Court of the Republic of Belarus the organization's license was revoked. In 2007 and 2009, Viasna made unsuccessful attempts to reacquire registration, both times refused by the Belarusian Ministry of Justice.

In 2002, the Centre was liquidated by the decision of the Supreme Court of the Republic of Belarus as a "punishment" for observation and monitoring the presidential election. A year later, in 2004, the Centre was accepted into the International Federation for Human Rights. In 2007 the UN Human Rights Committee recognized the liquidation of the Human Rights Centre by the Belarusian authorities as a violation of Article 22, paragraph 1 of the International Covenant on Civil and Political Rights, but the official Minsk ignored this decision.

=== 2010-2019 ===
The controversial 2010 presidential election were followed by a large-scale crackdown on political activists, both Viasna's offices and Bialatski's home have been repeatedly searched by state security forces.

On 14 February, 2011, Bialatski was summoned to the Public Prosecutor's office and warned that as Viasna was an unregistered organization, the government would seek criminal proceedings against it if the group continued to operate. Later in 2011, Bialatski was sentenced to four and a half years in prison on tax evasion charges. He served more than 3 years before an amnesty in 2014.

On 26 November 2012, in accordance with a court ruling against Bialatski, the Minsk office of Viasna was confiscated and sealed by the Belarusian government. Amnesty International described the closure as "a blatant violation of Belarus' international human rights obligations".

=== 2020-present ===
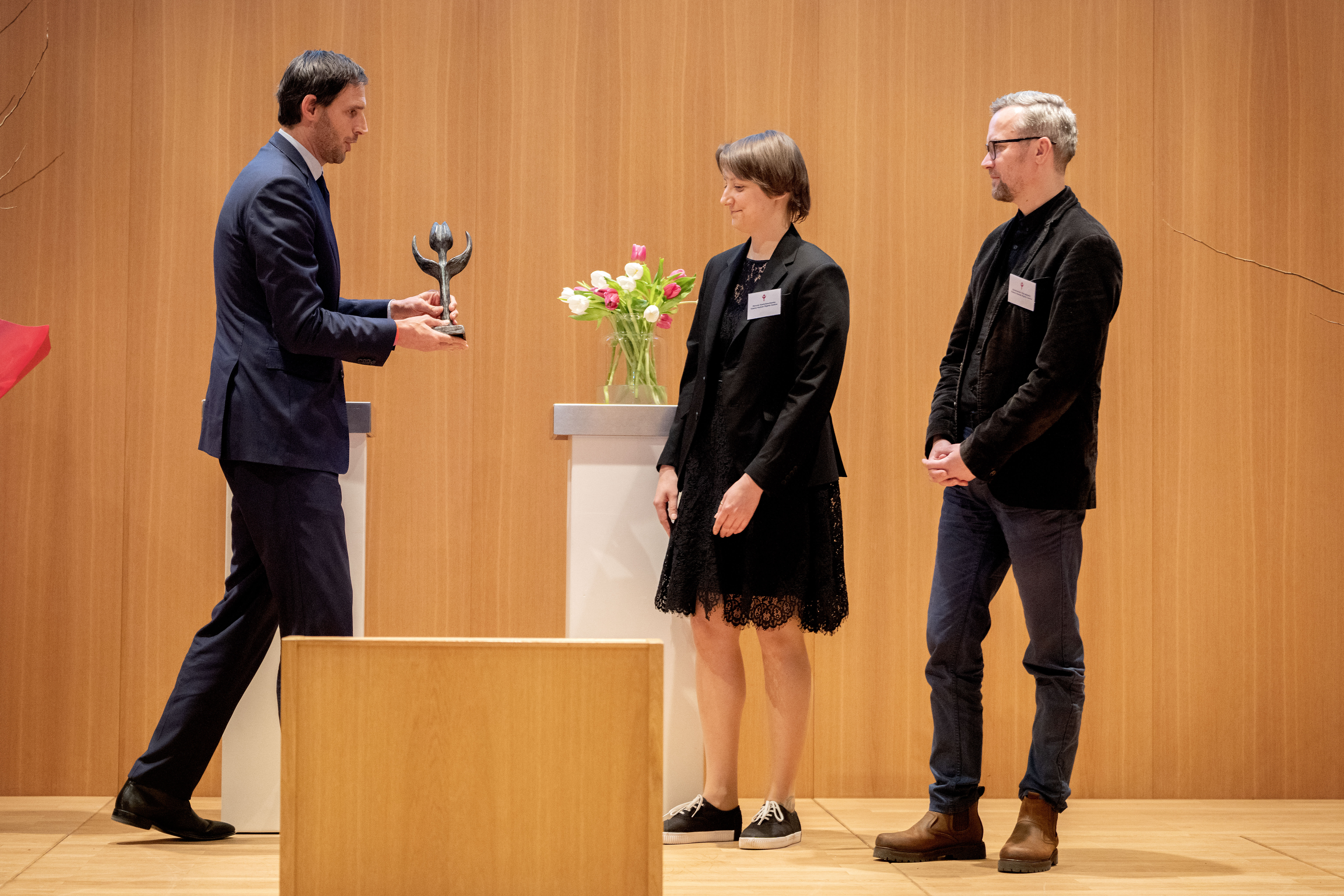
Wopke Hoekstra presents the Human Rights Tulip to Viasna Human Rights Centre in December 2022

During the 2020–2021 Belarusian protests, the Center Viasna documented the widespread use of torture by the authorities.

Following the 2020–2021 Belarusian protests, the Viasna Human Rights Centre together with the Rehabilitation and Research Centre for Torture Victims, REDRESS and the International Committee for Investigation of Torture in Belarus founded the International Accountability Platform for Belarus. In a joint declaration, 19 states expressed their full support for the establishment of such a platform.

In the ongoing crackdown on independent media and human rights defenders in Belarus, "Viasna" suffered from significant pressure. On 17 September, 2020, Viasna's coordinator of volunteers' network Maria Rabkova was arrested and charged with "training and other preparation of people for participation in mass riots" as well as "membership of a criminal organization". Leanid Sudalenka, lawyer of the Homieĺ (Gomel) branch of Viasna, volunteers Andrei Chepyuk and Maryia Tarasenka were arrested with criminal charges in the early 2021. Rabkova spent more than 6 months in pre-trial detention. On February 16, 2021, the Investigative Committee searched Viasna's headquarters in Minsk and regional offices, raided employees' homes – more than 40 addresses in any way connected to Viasna. A criminal case against the activists was opened under Article 342, meaning "organizing or preparing actions that grossly violate the public order or taking active part in such actions". Dzmitry Salauyou, board member of Viasna, was detained and beaten by the police. The persecution of Viasna members continues, politically motivated charges have been levelled on Valiantsin Stefanovich, Uladzimir Labkovich and Ales Bialiatski.

In the winter of 2021–2022, the Belarusian authorities recognized Viasna's Internet resources as extremist materials, and in August 2023, Viasna was declared an extremist group. Participation in the activities of an extremist group is a criminal offense under Belarusian law.

As of December 2022, more than 100 active members worked at Viasna, though many were forced into exile. Despite the ongoing crackdown, the organization is referred to as the biggest and most important human right defender in Belarus. As stated by Viasna's activist Alexander Burakov, the work in Belarusian regions is completely restored and the amount of volunteers has grown.

On August 14, 2023, the social media accounts and website of Viasna's Homiel branch were added to the country's List of Extremist Content. On August 23, 2023, the Ministry of Internal Affairs of Belarus declared Viasna an "extremist formation" and prohibited all of its activities". The organization was accused of "organizing activities aimed at preparing attacks on the sovereignty and public security of the Republic of Belarus, discrediting and insulting officials."

On 3 March, 2023, Bialiatski, Stefanovich, and Labkovich were sentenced to 10, 9, and 7 years in prison respectively. The sentence was widely condemned by international human right defenders, Amnesty International demanded an immediate release.

As of 2024, the pressure on Viasna continues. On March 3, 2024, the GUBOPiK raided houses of three activists and arrested them under charges of aiding and abetting an extremist organisation.

=== Nobel prize ===
On October 7, 2022, it was announced that the head of the Viasna Ales Bialiatski was awarded the Nobel Peace Prize together with the Center for Civil Liberties (Ukraine) and Memorial (Russia). On December 10, 2022, at the ceremony the Nobel Peace Prize on behalf of her husband was accepted by Natalia Pinchuk, Bialiatski's wife, along with Jan Rachinsky, chairman of the Memorial, and Oleksandra Matviichuk, head of the Center for Civil Liberties. Pinchuk read a lecture, written by Bialiatski.

== Awards ==
- 2005 – Bialatski and "Viasna" won the Homo Homini Award of the Czech NGO People in Need, which recognizes "an individual who is deserving of significant recognition due to their promotion of human rights, democracy and non-violent solutions to political conflicts".
- 2020 – "Viasna" received the 5th Democracy Defender Award.
- November 2021 – "Viasna" and Gerhart Baum won the German Marion Dönhoff Prize for "international understanding and reconciliation".
- May 2022 – "Viasna" received The Albie Award 2022 by the "Clooney Foundation for Justice", in the nomination "Justice for Democracy Defenders". The award ceremony took place in September in New York. Alina Stefanovich, the wife of political prisoner and human rights activist Valentin Stefanovich, received the award on behalf of "Viasna".
- In 2022, "Viasna" founder Bialiatski was awarded the Nobel Peace Prize, along with the organizations Memorial and Centre for Civil Liberties.
- On December 8, 2022, in Hague "Viasna" was awarded with "The Human Rights Tulip 2022" by the Government of the Netherlands.
- In December 2023, the Centre was awarded the United Nations Prize in the Field of Human Rights.

== Literature ==
- Ioffe, Grigory; Silitski, Vitali (2018). Historical Dictionary of Belarus (Historical Dictionaries of Europe) (Third ed.). Lanham: Rowman & Littlefield. p. 334. ISBN 978-1538117057.
- Kulakevich, Tatsiana; Kubik, Jan (2023). "Anti-Authoritarian Learning: Prospects for Democratization in Belarus Based on a Study of Polish Solidarity" (PDF). Nationalities Papers. 51 (4): 823–837. doi:10.1017/nps.2022.34.
