= Gollancz Prize =

Gollancz Prize may refer to:

- Sir Israel Gollancz Prize (established 1924), awarded to scholars of the English language by the British Academy
- Victor Gollancz Prize (established 2000), human rights award given by the Society for Threatened Peoples
