= Yan Rachinsky =

Russian human rights activist

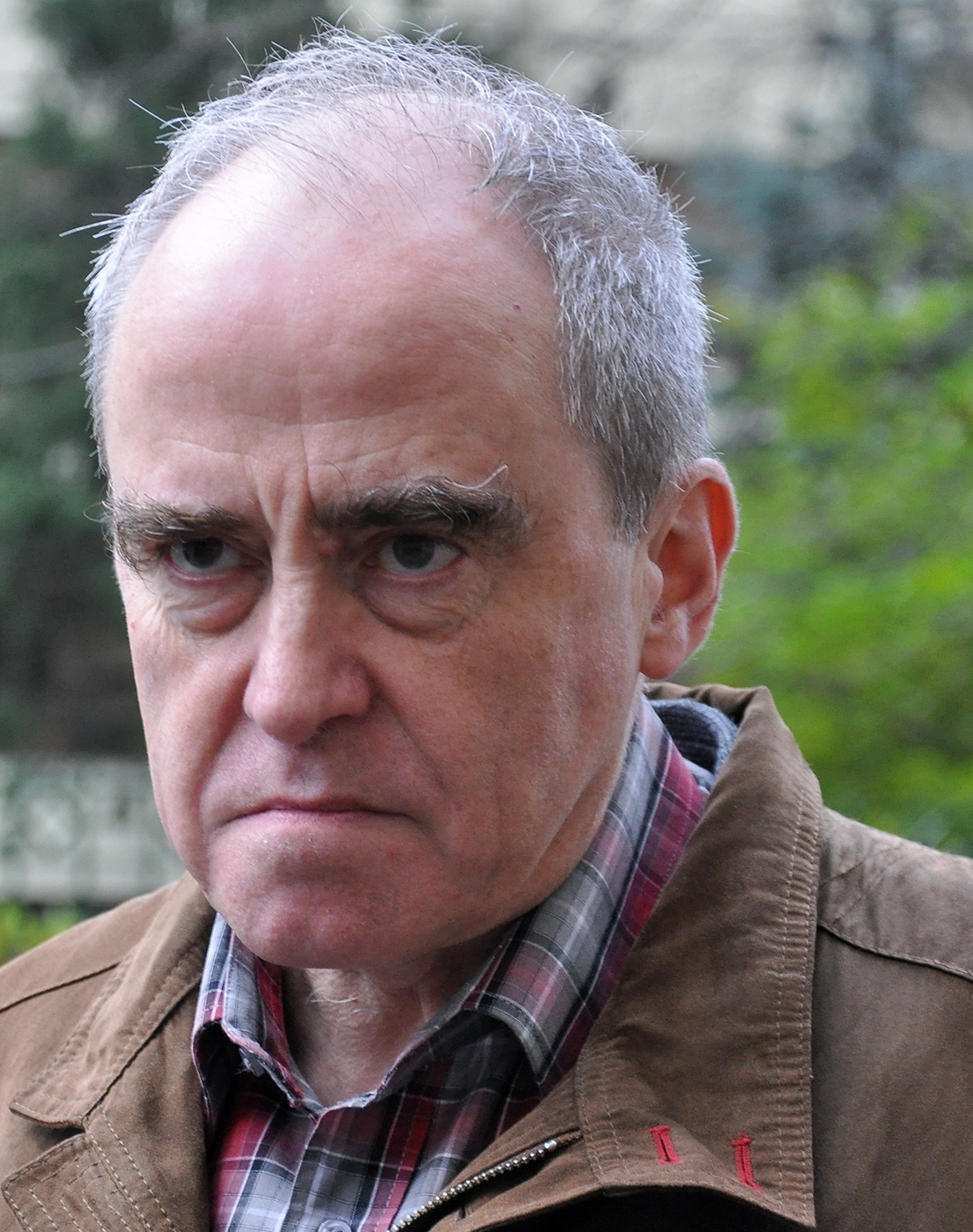
Yan Rachinsky

Yan Zbignevich Rachinsky (Russian: Ян Збигневич Рачинский, also spelt Jan Raczynski, born 6 December 1958 in Moscow, USSR) is a Russian human rights activist, programmer and mathematician.

He has been a human rights activist since the late 1980s when he first became involved in the work and activities of Memorial, a human rights organization examining the crimes of Stalin's regime. When the long-serving chairman of International Memorial, Arseny Roginsky, died in 2018, the board elected Rachinsky as his successor.

Memorial was awarded the Nobel Peace Prize in 2022, and Rachinsky received the prize on its behalf.

== Family ==
Rachinsky's grandfather Sigismund Raczyński was Polish; his grandmother Rebecca (Rivka) Fyalka (1888-1975) was a prominent member of the Socialist Revolutionary Party. She was sentenced to 13 years "hard labour" (katorga) by a field tribunal after the 1905 Revolution. She began her sentence in 1907 in Buryatia (east Siberia) and was sent into permanent exile in 1910. She escaped and after the February 1917 Revolution was elected to the Soviet of Workers and Soldiers Deputies in Svobodny (Amur Region).

== Work with Memorial HRC ==
In 1990-1995, Raczynski worked extensively with the Memorial Human Rights Centre (HRC), travelling to many hotspots in and around Russia: Karabakh in Azerbaijan; Transnistria in Moldova; and the Prigorodny district of North Ossetia. He was a member of the organisation's team of observers during the first Chechen conflict (1994-1996).

== International recognition ==
In April 2011, Raczynski was awarded the Order of Merit of the Republic of Poland for his research on the 1940 massacres in the Smolensk, Tver and Kharkov Regions of the USSR of POWs and others from the occupied territories of eastern Poland.

== "Victims of Political Terror" ==
Over the past 15 years, Raczynski has served as director of the project to assemble a single resource from the information scattered between the numerous Books of Remembrance compiled and published in Russia since the early 1990s. By 2016, its fifth edition, an online database entitled "Victims of Political Terror in the USSR", contained the names of about three million victims of the Soviet regime: those who were deported, imprisoned or executed from 1918 onwards. This impressive figure was estimated to represent only a quarter of those who would qualify for rehabilitation under the terms of the October 1991 Law.

A controversy arose in August 2021 when Israeli historian Aron Schneer publicly announced that Nazi collaborators guilty of war crimes had been included in the database as "victims of political terror". In December 2021, Raczynski responded on behalf of Memorial to Vladimir Putin: on 10 December the Russian president publicly named three Latvian polizei, who had already been excluded from the database in September 2021. Raczynski and Memorial suggested that the Russian authorities should express some appreciation for Memorial's work in compiling such an extensive database.

In 2015, formulating the State program for the Commemoration of the Victims of Political Repression, President Putin had talked of creating a unified database of victims. In January 2021 he instructed the FSB, Ministry of Internal Affairs and other relevant bodies to report back on this proposal in early October 2021. By the end of that year, however, nothing more was known of their activities. Memorial, meanwhile, was hampered as before by a lack of access to the archival materials at the disposal of the police and security services.

== Closure of Memorial ==
In mid-November 2021 lawsuits were brought against International Memorial and Memorial HRC in the RF Supreme Court and the Moscow City Court, respectively.

After a number of hearings, the Moscow courts ruled on two consecutive days, 28 and 29 December 2021, that both organisations should dissolve. "We never counted on love from the State," commented Raczynski.

There were international protests, and a petition in many languages attracted tens of thousands of signatures worldwide.

As board chairman of International Memorial, Raczynski said that the organisation would appeal against the decision, but it was forced to close.

Memorial was awarded the Nobel Peace Prize in 2022. Raczynski told the BBC that he was ordered to turn down the prize by the Russian authorities. He received the prize on behalf of Memorial and gave the Nobel Lecture.

== See also ==
- Chechnya
- Katyn massacre (1940) in the USSR.
- Memorial (society)
- Arseny Roginsky

== Bibliography ==
- Alexander Cherkasov and Oleg Orlov, Russia and Chechnya: a trail of crimes and errors, 1998 Zvenya publishers: Moscow, 9785787000214, 398 pp (in Russian).
- Marsella, Anthony J.; Johnson, Jeanette L.; Watson, Patricia; Gryczynski, Jan, eds. (2013). Ethnocultural Perspectives on Disaster and Trauma: Foundations, Issues, and Applications. USA: Springer.
