= Oleksandra Matviichuk =

Ukrainian human rights activist (born 1983)

- Олександра Матвійчук
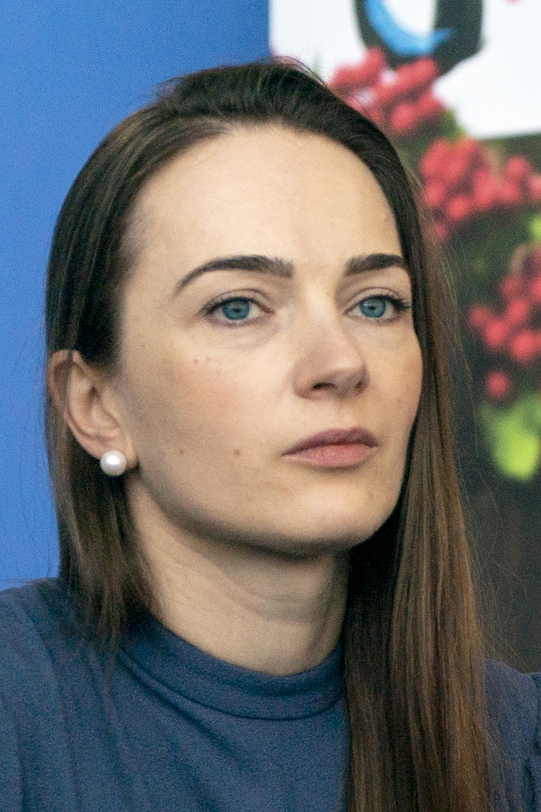
- Matviychuk in 2022
- Born: 8 October 1983 (age 43); Boyarka, Ukrainian SSR, Soviet Union (now Boiarka, Kyiv Oblast, Ukraine)
- Education: Kyiv University (LLM)
- Occupations: Lawyer and human rights activist

Oleksandra Viacheslavivna Matviichuk (Ukrainian: Олександра В’ячеславівна Матвійчук; born 8 October 1983) is a Ukrainian human rights lawyer and civil society leader based in Kyiv. She heads the non-profit organization Centre for Civil Liberties (Nobel Peace Prize receiver in 2022) and is a campaigner for democratic reforms in her country and the OSCE region. From October 2022 to October 2025, she has been Vice-President of the International Federation for Human Rights (FIDH). Matviichuk is a member of the Steering Committee of the World Movement for Democracy, a project of the National Endowment for Democracy (NED).

== Early life and education ==
Matviichuk attended Taras Shevchenko National University of Kyiv, graduating in 2007 when she was conferred a LL.M. In 2017, she became the first woman to participate in the Ukrainian Emerging Leaders Program of Stanford University.

== Career ==
Matviichuk started working for the non-profit organization Centre for Civil Liberties in 2007, when it was established.

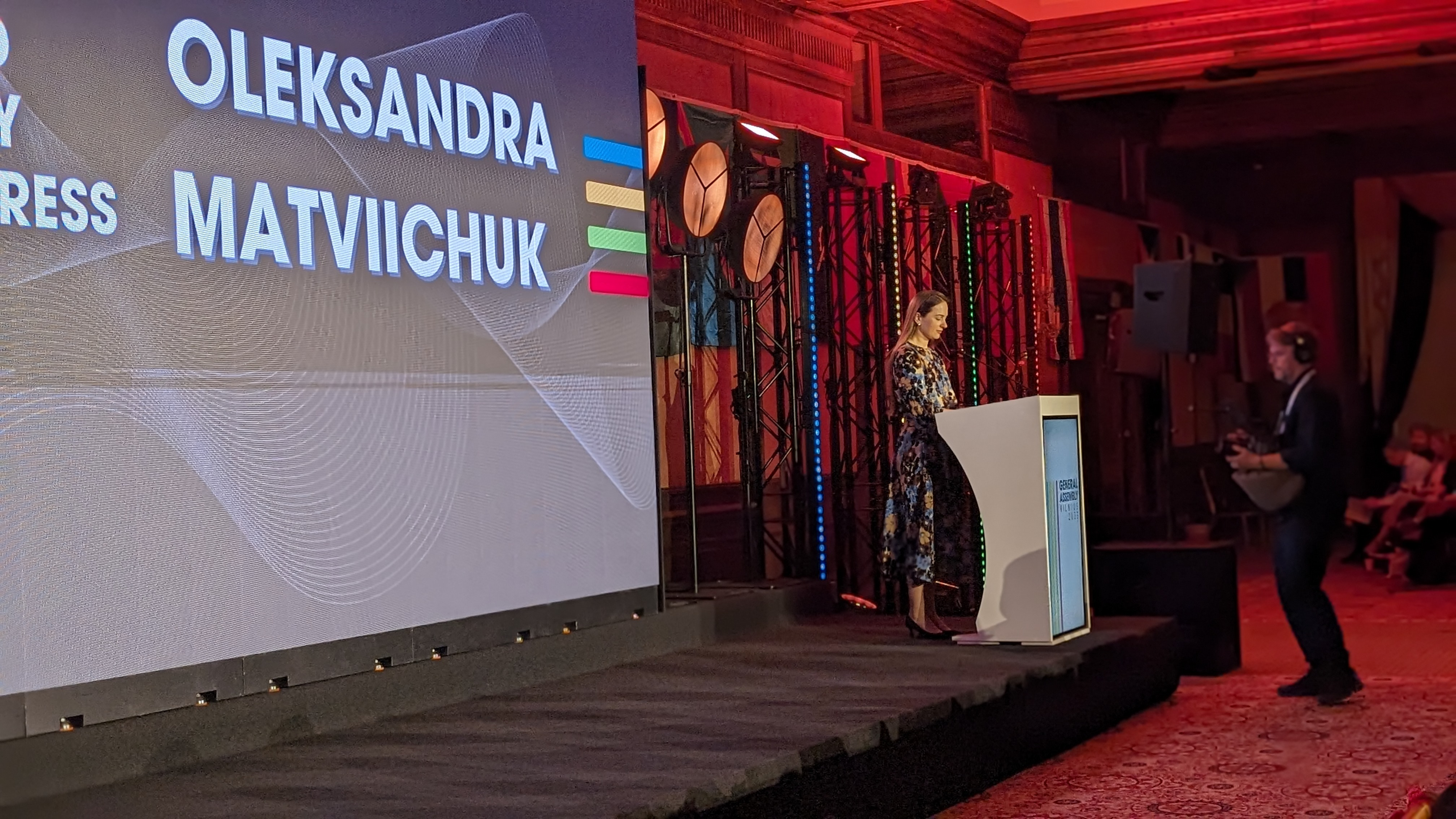
Oleksandra Matviichuk talking

In 2012 Matviichuk became a member of the Advisory Council under the Commissioner for Human Rights of Ukraine's national parliament (the Verkhovna Rada).

After the violent crackdown of peaceful demonstrations on Independence Square in Kyiv on 30 November 2013, she coordinated the Euromaidan SOS civic initiative. The purpose of Euromaidan SOS was to provide legal assistance to the victims of Euromaidan in Kyiv and other Ukrainian cities, as well as to collect and analyze information to protect protesters and provide interim assessments of the situation. Matviichuk has since then run multiple international mobilization campaigns for the release of prisoners of conscience such as the #letmypeoplego campaign and the #SaveOlegSentsov global action for the release of illegally imprisoned people in Russia and the occupied Crimea and Donbas. She is the author of a number of reports to various UN bodies, Council of Europe, European Union, OSCE and several submissions to the International Criminal Court in The Hague.

On 4 June 2021, Matviichuk was nominated to the United Nations Committee against Torture and made history as Ukraine's first female candidate to the UN treaty body. She ran on a platform to limit violence against women in conflict.

Between the Revolution of Dignity and 2022, she focused on documentation of war crimes during the war in Donbas. Meeting then Vice President of the United States Joe Biden in 2014, she advocated for more weapons support to help end the war.

After the 2022 Russian invasion of Ukraine, Matviichuk has appeared on a number of international media to represent Ukrainian civil society, particularly in relation to issues that relate to internal displaced people and on the issue of war crimes, as well as other human rights issues. According to Foreign Policy, she advocated the creation of a special 'hybrid court' to investigate war crime issues and human rights violations due to the large number of issues. Matviichuk called for Vladimir Putin and Russian soldiers to be tried in a special tribunal for the Russian invasion of Ukraine, stating that it could have a cooling effect on the "brutality of human rights violations that Russian troops are committing".

== Awards and honours ==
In 2007, Oleksandra Matviichuk was awarded the Vasyl Stus Prize for 'outstanding achievements in this field, clear civic position, and active presence in the Ukrainian cultural space'. She is the youngest winner in the history of the award.

In 2015, Matviichuk became a laureate of the Norwegian 'Lindebrække prize for democracy and human rights'. Chairman of the jury and former Minister of Foreign Affairs in Norway, Jan Petersen motivated their selection: 'It is important to support and honour those who took part in Ukraine's democracy movement. Those who worked day and night, speaking up for a democratic development in Ukraine – and later investigating the crimes that took place at Maidan. This year's recipient of Sjur Lindebrække Prize for Human Rights of Democracy is such a voice.' On 24 February 2016, 16 delegations to the OSCE recognized Matviychuk with their first Democracy Defender Award for 'Exclusive contribution to promoting democracy and human rights'. The U.S. Embassy to Ukraine then recognized Matviichuk as Ukraine's Woman of Courage 2017 for 'her constant and courageous dedication in defending rights of Ukrainian people'. In September 2022, Matviichuk and the Centre for Civil Liberties (the organisation headed by Matviichuk) were among the laureates of the Right Livelihood Award for their work with Ukrainian democratic institutions and pursuing accountability for war crimes. She was honored as one of the BBC 100 Women in December 2022.

The Centre for Civil Liberties was awarded the 2022 Nobel Peace Prize, jointly with Ales Bialiatski and Russian organization Memorial. This was the first Nobel Prize awarded to a Ukrainian citizen or organization.

She was awarded a doctor honoris causa from Université catholique de Louvain on 16 February 2023.

Summary

- 2022 – Hillary Rodham Clinton Award
- 2022 – Right Livelihood Award
- 2021 – Ukraine's candidate to the UN Committee against Torture
- 2017 – "Ukrainian Women of Courage" Award from the U.S. Embassy.
- 2016 – Democracy Defender Award, OSCE Parliamentary Assembly
- 2015 – "Sjur Lindebrække Prize for Democracy and Human Rights", Awarded by the Norwegian centre-right political party Høyre
- 2007 – The Vasyl Stus Prize, Ukrainian Center of PEN International

== Major publications in English ==
"The Fear Peninsula: Chronicles of Occupation and Violation of Human Rights in Crimea"

"The Price of Freedom" - Summary of the public report of human rights organizations on crimes against humanity committed during the period of Euromaidan

"28 Kremlin Hostages" - Main violations and prospects for release
