= Tilman Zülch =

German human rights activist (1939–2023)

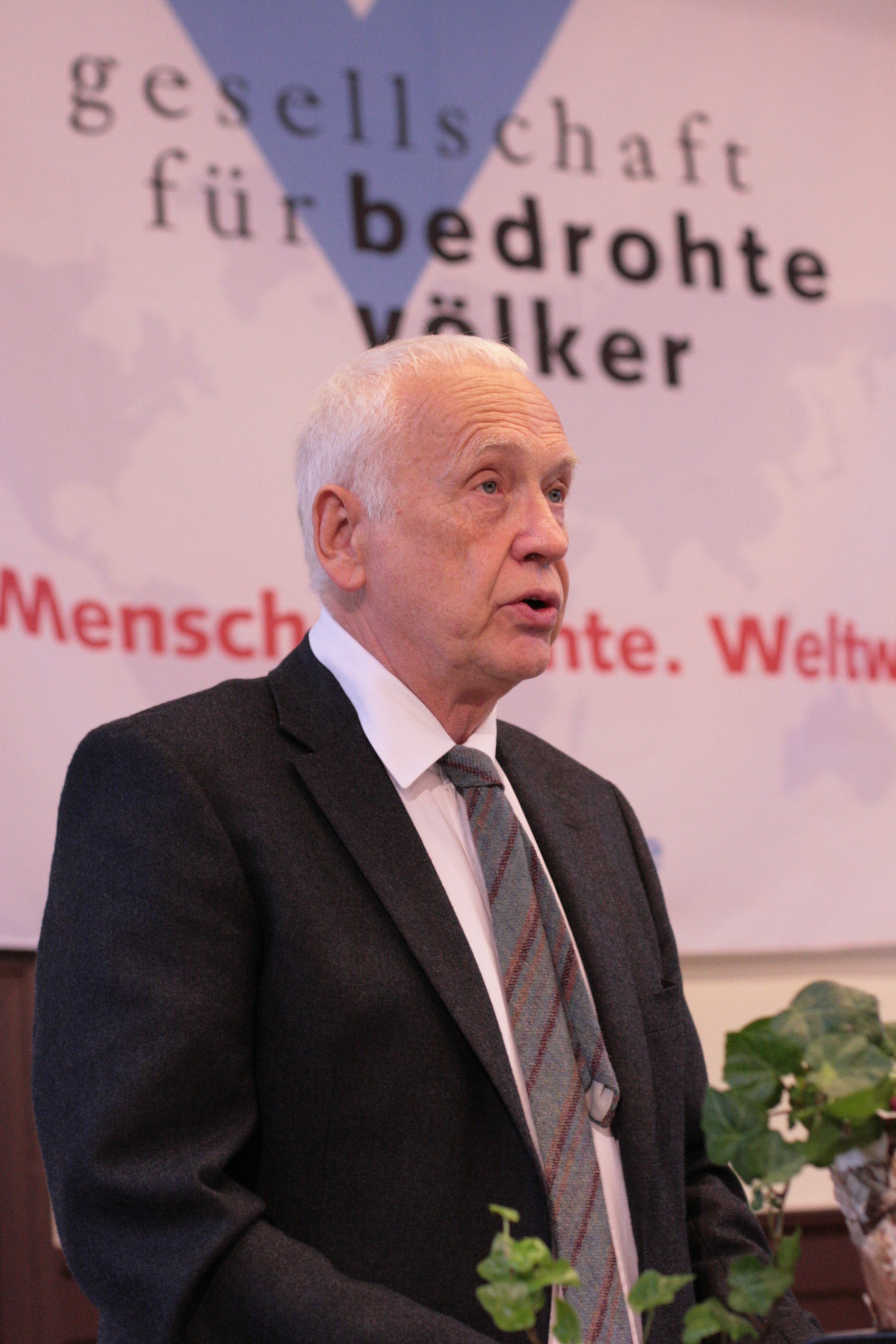
- Zülch in 2010
- Born: 2 September 1939; Liebau, Reichsgau Sudetenland, Germany (present-day Czech Republic)
- Died: 17 March 2023 (aged 83); Göttingen, Lower Saxony, Germany
- Occupations: General secretary of the Society for Threatened Peoples and Society for Threatened Peoples International
- Known for: Human rights activist

Tilman Zülch (German pronunciation: [ˈtɪlman ˈt͜sʏlç]; 2 September 1939 – 17 March 2023) was a German human rights activist. He was the founder and general secretary of the Society for Threatened Peoples (STP).

== Biography ==
Zülch was born in Liebau, in the Sudetenland, now Libina, Czech Republic. His family left the Sudetenland in 1945, during the postwar expulsion of Germans. As a boy he belonged to the Bündische Jugend, part of the German Youth Movement, in Hamburg. He completed his Abitur at the Louisenlund Gymnasium in Rendsburg-Eckernförde. He studied politics and economics in Hamburg, Graz, and Heidelberg. He was active in college political groups and the Außerparlamentarische Opposition.

In June 1968, with Klaus Guerke, he founded Aktion: Biafra Hilfe to draw the attention of the world to the genocide happening in Biafra, in present-day Nigeria.

The Society for Threatened Peoples (German: Gesellschaft für bedrohte Völker) grew out of this organization in 1970. Its main office has been located in Göttingen since 1979. As of 2006, its German branch, GfbV-Deutschland, is one of the largest human rights organizations in Germany.

Zülch felt that it is an obligation to campaign for religiously and ethnically persecuted people, especially for Germany and Austria given the crimes of Nazi Germany. He felt that the way for Germans to deal with the past is not to stay silent in face of other crimes such as those of the Stalin era, the mass expulsions of Germans after 1945, or the genocides of today. For example, in the early 1990s he was fined for breaking into a Messerschmitt-Bölkow-Blohm warehouse in Munich to secure evidence of the company's covertly supplying the Iraqi air force; he repeatedly protested Russia's military actions in Chechnya, comparing the bombing of Grozny to Dresden in 1945; in 2005 in advance of the official visit of German Chancellor Gerhard Schröder to Kaliningrad (formerly Königsberg, East Prussia) to celebrate the city's 750th anniversary, he demanded in an open letter that Schröder note the mass expulsions and deaths of Germans there and elsewhere in the former eastern territories of Germany under Stalin; he protested the 2008 Summer Olympics in China on behalf of Tibet, comparing it to the 1936 Olympics in Berlin under the Nazis; and he has been credited as one of those most responsible for the Sinti and Roma being recognized as a minority people in Germany. He was also the editor of the journal bedrohte völker (previously pogrom).

Zülch died on 17 March 2023, at the age of 83.

== Awards and honors ==
- GeoEnvironment Prize 1982
- Niedersachsenpreis for Journalism 1996
- Silver Order of the Arms of the Presidency of the Republic of Bosnia and Herzegovina 1996
- Annual Award of the Federation of Expulsees 2001
- Federal Cross of Merit am Bande 2002
- Human Rights Prize of the Sudeten Germans Welfare and Culture Association 2003
- Göttingen Peace Prize in recognition of his lifetime work 2003
- Medal of the Iraqi-Kurdish National Assembly 2005
- Srebrenica Award against Genocide of the three women's and mothers' associations 2006
- Sarajevo Anti-War Centre's Freedom Prize for Human Rights 2006
- Human Rights Prize of the Sinti and Roma 2014
- Honorary citizenship, City of Sarajevo
- Honorary Member of the Saxony-Anhalt Federation of the Victims of Stalinist Persecution
- Honorary Member of the Union of Women camp Detainees of Bosnia Herzegovina
- Member of the Jury for the Weimar Human Rights Prize
- Member of the Jury of the "Centre Against Expulsions" Supporters Association

== Publications ==
(All available only in German)

- Guerke, Klaus and Tilman Zülch. 1968. Biafra, Todesurteil für ein Volk? Berlin: Luttner-Verlang.

Biafra, Death sentence for a People

- Zülch, Tilman. 1979a. Von denen keiner spricht. Verfolgte Minderheiten. Reinbek: Rowohlt.

The People That No-one Talks About: Persecuted Minorities

- Zülch, Tilman. 1979b. In Auschwitz vergast, bis heute verfolgt – zur Situation der Sinti und Roma in Europa. Reinbek: Rowohlt.

Gassed in Auschwitz, still persecuted today – on the situation of the Sinti and Roma in Europe

- Zülch, Tilman. 1991. Völkermord an den Kurden. Hamburg: Luchtehand.

Genocide of the Kurds

- Zülch, Tilman. 1993. "Ethnische Säuberungen" – Völkermord für Großserbien. Hamburg: Luchterhand. Sarajevo 1996.

Ethnic Cleansing – Genocide in the cause of Greater Serbia

- Vollmer, Johannes and Tilman Zülch. 1996. Aufstand der Opfer – Verratene Völker zwischen Hitler und Stalin. Göttingen: pogrom Taschenbücher.

Resistance of the Victims – Betrayed peoples between Hitler and Stalin
