= Society for Threatened Peoples =

Society for Threatened Peoples International (STPI)
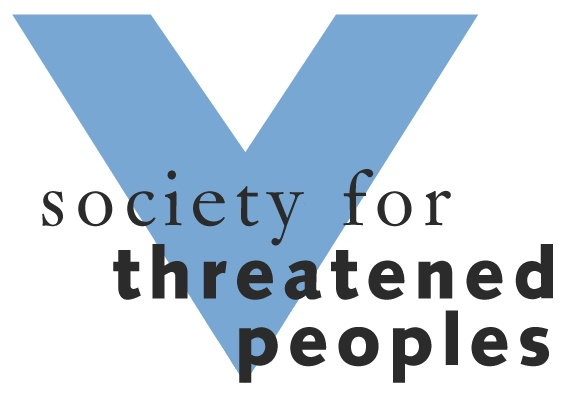
- Logo de la Sociedad por los Pueblos Amenazados
- Founded: 1970
- Founder: Tilman Zülch
- Type: Non-governmental organization
- Purpose: Religious and ethnic minorities and indigenous peoples
- Location: Göttingen, Germany
- Region served: Germany, Bosnia, Italy, Austria, Switzerland, Iraq
- Website: https://www.gfbv.de/en/

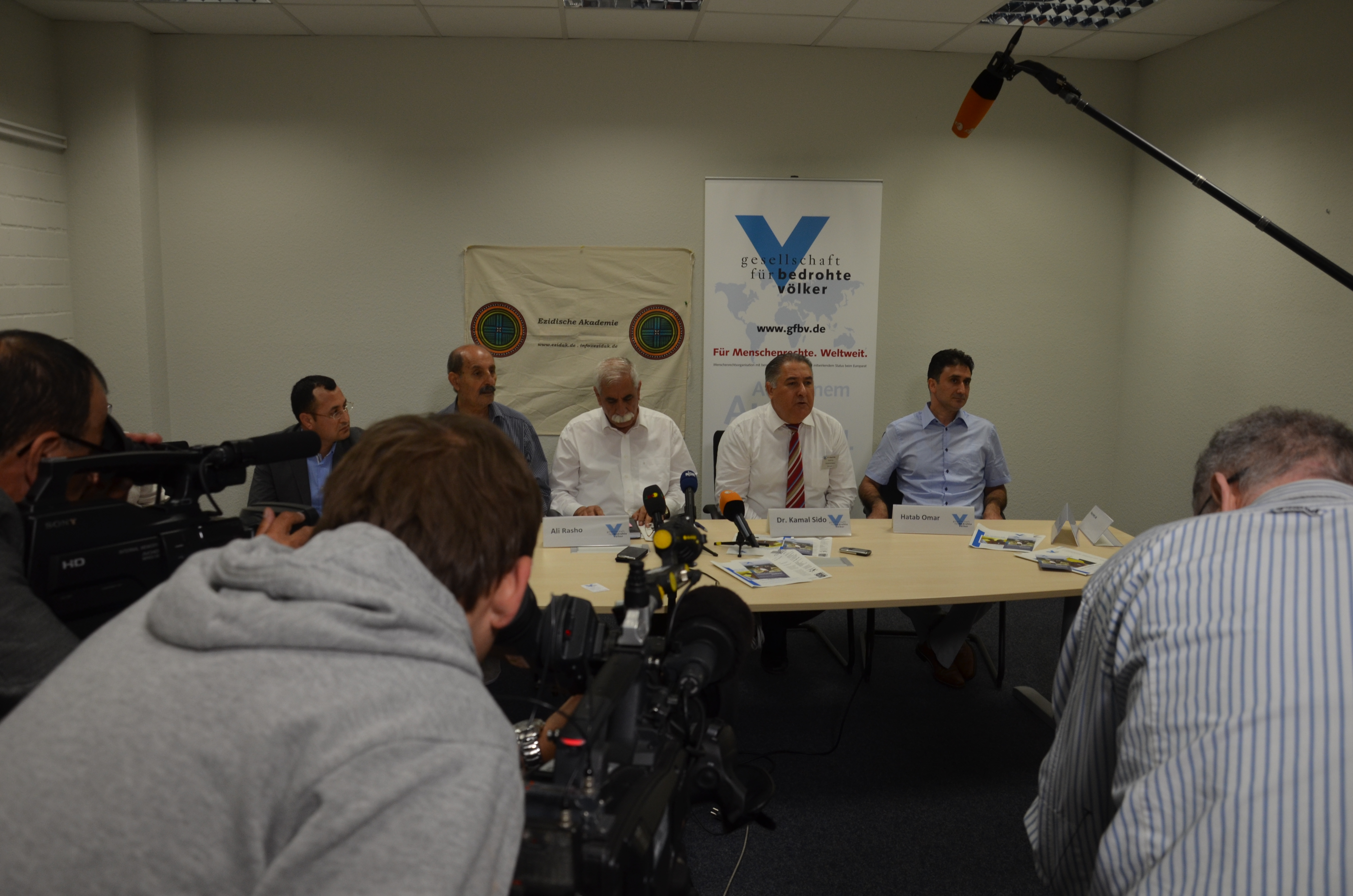
News conference with the Yezidian Academy in August 2014 concerning the terror of the Islamic State of Iraq and Syria (ISIS) in Iraq.

The Society for Threatened Peoples International STPI (German: Gesellschaft für bedrohte Völker-International, GfbV-International) is an international NGO and human rights organization with its headquarters in Göttingen, Germany. Its aim is to create awareness of and protect minority peoples around the world who are threatened by oppressive governments. The society states that it "campaigns against all forms of genocide and ethnocide." It has consultative status with the United Nations, participatory status with the Council of Europe, and has branches in Germany, Austria, Switzerland, Italy, Bosnia and Herzegovina, and Iraqi Kurdistan.

The Secretary General of the Society for Threatened Peoples International (STPI) and Society for Threatened Peoples-Germany (STP) is Tilman Zülch. The society awards the Victor Gollancz Prize. The Society for Threatened Peoples has a strong focus on Eastern Europe and other parts of Eurasia, including Russia and the Balkans, but it also works with countries in Africa and the Middle East.

== History ==
The Society for Threatened Peoples Germany emerged in 1970 from the Hamburg-based "Aktion Biafra-Hilfe." Aktion Biafra-Hilfe was founded in June 1968 by Tilman Zülch and Klaus Guerke during the Biafra War to draw attention of the world to the occurrences within Biafra in present-day Nigeria and to stop the hunger and genocide going on there. Zülch went to the area to witness the atrocities and eventually wrote a book together with Klaus Guerke. The experience campaigning for the protection of the victims and refugees encouraged campaigns for other minorities transforming Aktion Biafra-Hilfe into the Society for Threatened Peoples-Germany.

In 1978 the headquarters of the Society for Threatened Peoples Germany moved from Hamburg to Göttingen.

Since 1993 the STP has consultative status with the United Nations Economic and Social Council. The STPI is also a Member organization of Committee for a Democratic UN. Since January 2005 the STPI also has participatory status at the Council of Europe.

== Organization and areas of work ==
The STPI is one of several European minority rights organizations. In December 2011, the organization had 5774 members and 675 sponsors, most of whom are based in Germany. The organization's activities are coordinated in Göttingen. Regional groups support the work of the STP-Germany in a few German cities, including Berlin, Hamburg, Munich, Münster and Nuremberg. The STPI publishes press releases, organizes public demonstrations, arranges post card fund raising campaigns, prepares reports for court hearings, produces educational materials for teachers, and publishes the journal "Pogrom", which is a source of information about the situation of ethnic and religious minorities.

Since its founding, a main focus of the human rights work of the STP, has been the African continent; though the STPI is not represented by a section. Since the Yugoslav wars the STPI has been disproportionately active in Bosnia and Herzegovina as well as Kosovo. In Kosovo the STP-Germany paid for a team that, under the direction of the human rights worker Paul Polansky, worked for the interests of the Roma. In Bosnia and Herzegovina the support of the survivors of the Srebrenica Massacre is particularly important for the German chapter of the STPI. Another focus of the STPI is indigenous peoples. Renate Domnick, a volunteer for the STP-Germany, organized the first large European trip of an Indian delegation from 16 American countries. In the Middle East the Kurds play an important role for the STP: This pushed the STP-Germany to open a STPI office in the Kurdish area of northern Iraq.

Prominent supporters of STP-Germany include: the writer and futurologist Robert Jungk,, the author Günter Grass, former German chancellor Willy Brandt, current President of East Timor José Ramos-Horta, and Marek Edelman a leader in the Warsaw Ghetto Uprising.

== Political goals and strategies ==
The Society for Threatened Peoples places the fight against genocide, forced migration, racism, all forms of minority oppression, and deportation of refugees in their country of origin as the center of their work. Their themes include the cultural and religious groupings like the Falun Gong in China, the Christian minorities in Iran, or ethnic groups like the Roma or Chechen. The Society for Threatened Peoples lobbies politicians and uses letter writing campaigns to apply pressure for its causes.

The Society for Threatened Peoples has always maintained that forced migration, today often known as ethnic cleansing, of people is wrong and constitutes a crime. The Society for Threatened Peoples has advocated for a Centre against Expulsions.

The Society for Threatened Peoples has in special situations supported military interventions. The society supported the NATO intervention in the Kosovo War in 1999. In 2006 the Society for Threatened Peoples supported the protection of elections in the Congo by the German military.
