= 2022 Nobel Peace Prize =

Award

- Ales Bialiatski, Memorial and the Center for Civil Liberties
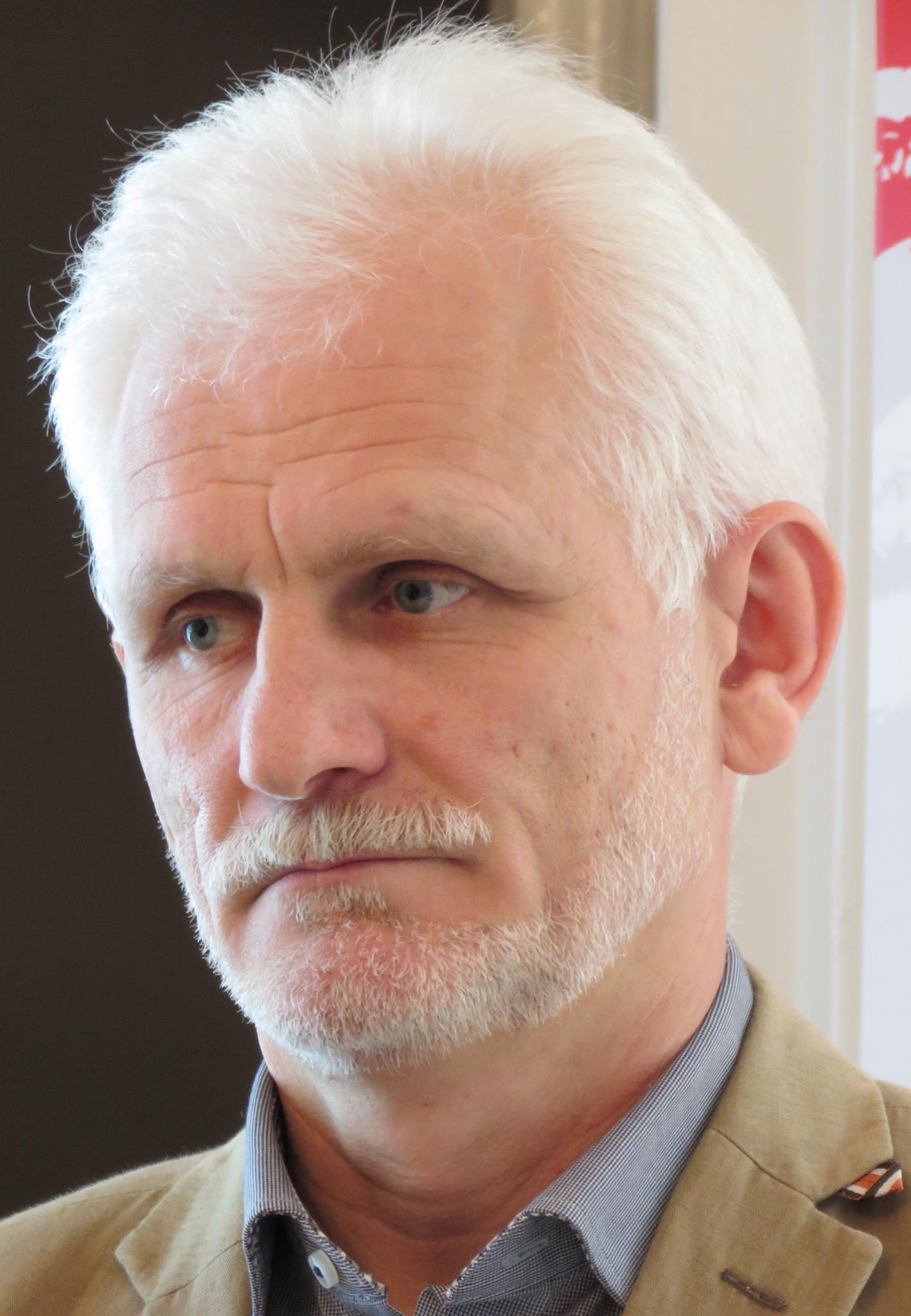
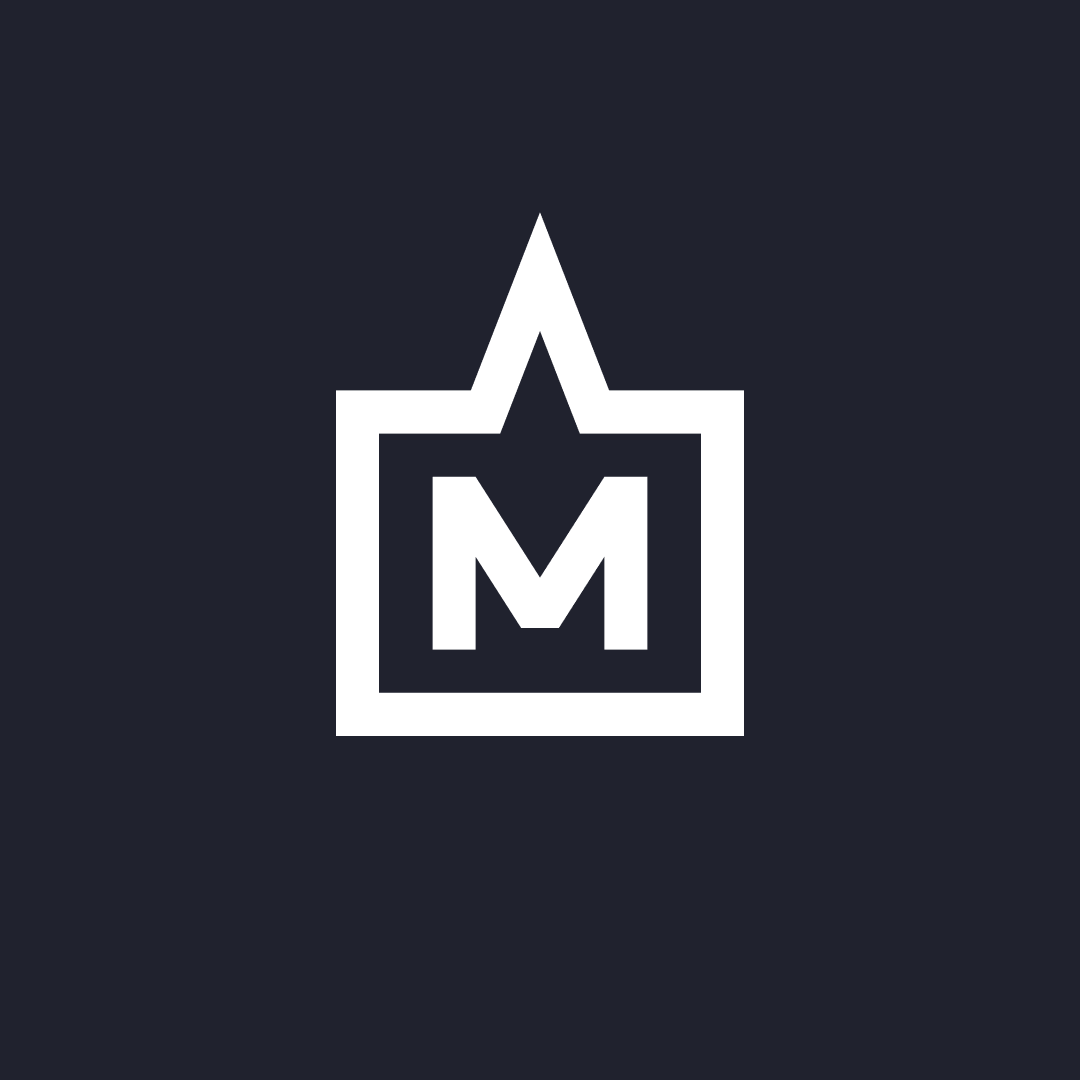
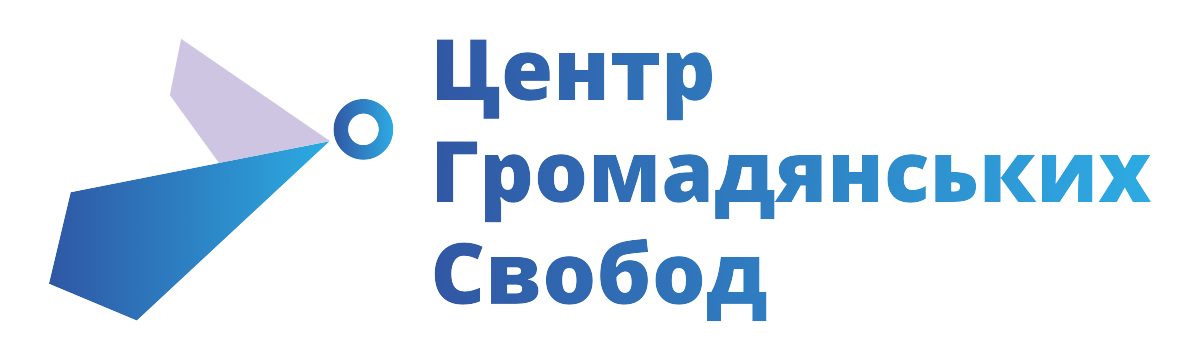
- Bialiatski (top left), Memorial (top right), and Center for Civil Liberties (bottom) "for their efforts in documenting war crimes, human rights abuses, and the abuse of power in their respective home countries."
- Date: 7 October 2022 (announcement by Berit Reiss-Andersen); 10 December 2022 (ceremony)
- Location: Oslo, Norway
- Presented by: Norwegian Nobel Committee
- Reward: 10.0 million SEK
- First award: 1901
- Website: Official website

The 2022 Nobel Peace Prize was awarded jointly to one individual and two organisations which advocate human rights and civil liberty. The recipients were the Belarusian activist Ales Bialiatski (born 1962), the Russian human rights organisation Memorial (founded in 1989) and the Ukrainian human rights organisation Center for Civil Liberties (founded in 2007). The citation given by the Norwegian Nobel Committee were the following:

The Peace Prize laureates represent civil society in their home countries. They have for many years promoted the right to criticise power and protect the fundamental rights of citizens. They have made an outstanding effort to document war crimes, human right abuses and the abuse of power. Together they demonstrate the significance of civil society for peace and democracy.

== Reactions ==
In Ukraine the joint awarding to organisations from Ukraine, Russia and Belarus was criticised by journalists for allegedly upholding the Russian nationalist stereotype of the "three brotherly people". The choice of the committee to award the prize while Russia and Ukraine were at war (with Belarus giving logistical support to the Russian army) was also criticised. According to the Center for Civil Liberties (in a press conference on 8 October 2022) "In no way should this award sound like an old narrative about fraternal nations" but "this story is about resistance to common evil." At the time of the press conference neither Ukrainian President Volodymyr Zelenskyy nor any other (Ukrainian) government official had congratulated the Center for Civil Liberties on winning the Nobel Prize.

== Candidates ==
Prior to his 2022 Ales Bialiatski's Nobel Peace Prize, he was nominated five times unsuccessfully. According to the Nobel Committee, there were 343 candidates for the 2022 Nobel Peace Prize, out of which 251 are individuals and 92 are organisations, becoming the second highest number recorded in history.

Nominations confirmed by the various News Agencies
Nominee	Country	Motivations	Nominator(s)	Source
Individuals
Masih Alinejad (b. 1976)	Iran	"for her advocacy for women's rights in Iran"	Erlend Wiborg (b. 1984)	
Julian Assange (b. 1971)	Australia	"in honor of his unparalleled contributions to the pursuit of peace, and his immense personal sacrifices to promote peace for all"	Martin Sonneborn (b. 1965); Sevim Dağdelen (b. 1975)	
David Attenborough (b. 1926)	United Kingdom	"[with IPBES] for their efforts to inform about, and protect, Earths natural diversity, a prerequisite for sustainable and peaceful societies"	Une Bastholm (b. 1986)	
Csaba Böjte, O.F.M. (b. 1959)	Hungary	"for his heroic efforts to rescue homeless orphans in Transylvania, providing them food, housing, and education through the Saint Francis Foundation's homes and shelters"	Miklós Kásler (b. 1950)	
Maria Elena Bottazzi (b. 1966)	United States	"[with Hotez] for their efforts to develop and distribute the COVID-19 vaccine, and their contributions to global vaccine equality."	Lizzie Fletcher (b. 1975)	
Dee Dawkins-Haigler (born 1970)	United States	"for her fight for social justice and human rights issues that promote peace and economic stability."	Roysdale A. Ford (?)	
Mustafa Dzhemilev (b. 1943)	Ukraine	"in recognition of his merits and of his long-standing attempts by the Crimean Tatars to solve problems peacefully."	Małgorzata Gosiewska (b. 1966)	
Pope Francis (1936–2025)	Vatican City	"for his efforts to help solve the climate crisis as well as his work towards peace and reconciliation"	Dag Inge Ulstein (b. 1980)	
Enes Kanter Freedom (b. 1992)	United States	"for his work defending human rights, including his criticism of Chinese atrocities against the Uyghur and Tibetan peoples"		
Simon Kofe (b. 1984)	Tuvalu	"for his work in highlighting climate change issues"	Guri Melby (b. 1981)	
Peter Hotez (b. 1958)	United States	"[with Bottazzi] for their efforts to develop and distribute the COVID-19 vaccine, and their contributions to global vaccine equality."	Lizzie Fletcher (b. 1975)	
Keith J. Krach (b. 1957)	United States	"for developing the 'Trust Principle' doctrine as a peaceful alternative to authoritarian's 'power principle'"	Miles Yu (b. 1962); Hugh Hewitt (b. 1956); Steven J. Buri (?)	
Opal Lee (b. 1926)	United States	"in recognition of her work to establish Juneteenth as a national holiday and bring awareness to the contributions and struggles of African Americans in the United States, as well as her mission to create a more equitable society for humanity"	34 members of the United States Congress	
Alexei Navalny (1976–2024)	Russia	"for his campaign against the Kremlin"	Peter Christian Frølich (b. 1987); Mathilde Tybring-Gjedde (b. 1992); Lech Wałęsa (b. 1943)	
Amjad Saqib (b. 1957)	Pakistan	"for his transformative work on poverty alleviation by providing interest-free microfinance services and free education"	Evarist Bartolo (b. 1952)	
Greta Thunberg (b. 2003)	Sweden	"for her tireless work to make politicians open their eyes to global climate crisis"		
Sviatlana Tsikhanouskaya (b. 1982)	Belarus	"for her brave, tireless and peaceful work for democracy and freedom in her home country"	Hårek Elvenes (b. 1959); Olaug Bollestad (b. 1961)	
Dhondup Wangchen (b. 1974)	Tibet	"for his courageous documentation to show the glimpse of Tibetans suffering inside Tibet."	Rasmus Hansson (b. 1954)	
Miriam Were (b. 1940)	Kenya	"for her tireless work since the 1970s in promoting trust between governments, health authorities, and the citizenry through culturally sensitive programs"	American Friends Service Committee	
Volodymyr Zelenskyy (b. 1978)	Ukraine	"for counteracting Russia's armed aggression against Ukraine"	Guy Verhofstadt (b. 1953); Andrus Ansip (b. 1956); 33 members of the European Parliament	
Organizations
Arctic Council (founded in 1996)	Norway	"for its exceptional cooperation in international politics and for demonstrating the need for cooperation and trust between countries in a time where peace is threatened around Ukraine and other regions."	Bård Ludvig Thorheim (b. 1976); Willfred Nordlund (b. 1988); Øystein Mathisen (b. 1991)	
Black Lives Matter (founded in 2013)	United States	"for their struggle against racism and racially motivated violence"	Petter Eide (b. 1959)	
Campaign for Uyghurs (CFU) (founded in 2017)	United States	"for their significant contributions to building fraternity between nations and promoting peace by defending the human rights of the Uyghur, Kazakh and other predominately Muslim ethnic minorities that the Chinese Communist Party (CCP) has targeted with genocide and other crimes against humanity"	Thomas Suozzi (b. 1962); Chris Smith (b. 1953)	
Uyghur Human Rights Project (UHRP) (founded in 2004) and	United States	"for their significant contributions to building fraternity between nations and promoting peace by defending the human rights of the Uyghur, Kazakh and other predominately Muslim ethnic minorities that the Chinese Communist Party (CCP) has targeted with genocide and other crimes against humanity"	Thomas Suozzi (b. 1962); Chris Smith (b. 1953)	
Intergovernmental Science-Policy Platform on Biodiversity and Ecosystem Services (IPBES) (founded in 2012)	United Nations	"[with Attenborough] for their efforts to inform about, and protect, Earths natural diversity, a prerequisite for sustainable and peaceful societies"	Une Bastholm (b. 1986)	
JA Worldwide (founded in 1919)	United States	"for helping millions of youth develop the skillset and mindset to create businesses, find meaningful employment, and build thriving communities"		
National Unity Government of Myanmar (formed in 2021)	Myanmar	"for its non-violent struggle for democracy and strong opposition to military oppression"	Ola Elvestuen (b. 1967)	
North Atlantic Treaty Organization (NATO) (founded in 1949)	Belgium	"for its actions to prevent further tensions from flaring between the West and Russia over Ukraine"	Erlend Wiborg (b. 1984)	
United World Colleges (founded in 1962)	United Kingdom	"in recognition of its mission to unite people, nations and cultures for peace and a sustainable future"	Alfred Bjørlo (b. 1972)	
Relief Riders (found in 2020)	India	"for delivering essentials to the vulnerable during the Covid-19 lockdowns in many cities of India"	Leszek Sibilski	

== Prize committee ==
The members of the Norwegian Nobel Committee that are responsible for selecting the laureate in accordance with the will of Alfred Nobel are the same as last year:

- Berit Reiss-Andersen (chair, born 1954), advocate (barrister) and former President of the Norwegian Bar Association, former state secretary for the Minister of Justice and the Police (representing the Labour Party). Member of the Norwegian Nobel Committee since 2012, reappointed for the period 2018–2023.
- Asle Toje (vice chair, born 1974), foreign policy scholar. Appointed for the period 2018–2023.
- Anne Enger (born 1949), former Leader of the Centre Party and Minister of Culture. Member since 2018, reappointed for the period 2021–2026.
- Kristin Clemet (born 1957), former Minister of Government Administration and Labour and Minister of Education and Research. Appointed for the period 2021–2026.
- Jørgen Watne Frydnes (born 1984), former board member of Médecins Sans Frontières Norway, board member of the Norwegian Helsinki Committee. Appointed for the period 2021–2026.
