= Victor Gollancz Prize =

Human Rights Award

The Victor Gollancz Prize is an international human rights prize awarded by the Society for Threatened Peoples. It is named for British humanitarian Sir Victor Gollancz.

The prize is awarded in Göttingen.

== Laureates ==
- 2000: The society Mothers of Srebrenica and Zepa, Bosnia-Hercegovina, for their work to identify the victims of the Srebrenica Genocide
- 2001: Zainap Gaschajewa and Lipkan Basajewa, Chechnya, for their humanitarian work and documenting of crimes in Chechnya
- 2003: The Society of Former Female Bosnian Concentration Camp Prisoners, Bosnia-Hercegovina, for their humanitarian work for the survivors of the Serb concentration camps and organized war rape campaigns, and the Widows of Barzan-Tal, Iraq, for their work for the families of the victims of the Barzan-Tal massacre
- 2004: Libkan Basaeva, Chechnya
- 2005: Sergei Kovalev, Russia, for his documenting of Russian crimes in Chechnya and his work within the Memorial organization, and Mustafa Dzhemilev, for his work for the Crimean Tatars
- 2008: Halima Bashir, West Sudan/Darfur, for her work for the people of Darfur, and Jovan Divjak, for humanitarian work for children in Sarajevo
- 2009: Memorial, Russia
- 2014: Bernard Kouchner, former French foreign minister and co-founder of Doctors without Borders, in recognition of his "lifelong, unwavering commitment to fight crimes against humanity"
