= Center for Civil Liberties (human rights organization) =

Ukrainian human rights organization

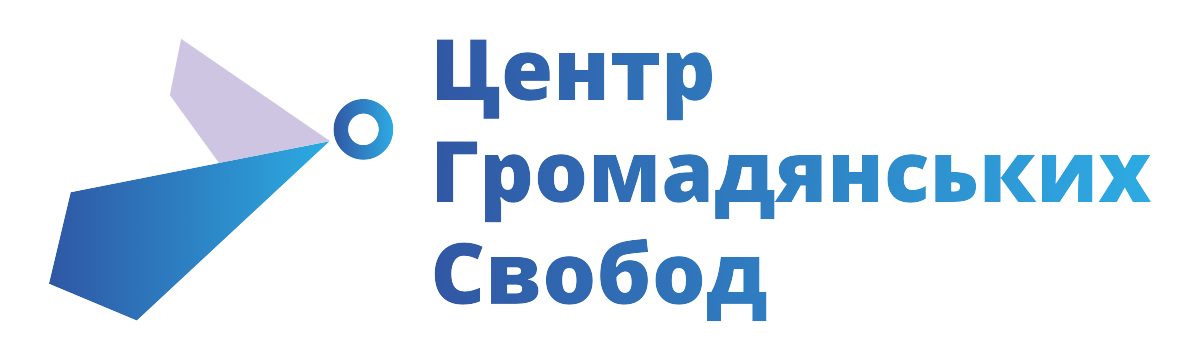
- Founded: 30 May 2007; 19 years ago
- Type: Human rights organization
- Purpose: Human rights group
- Headquarters: Kyiv, Ukraine
- Chairwoman: Oleksandra Matviichuk
- Award: Nobel Peace Prize (2022)
- Website: ccl.org.ua/en/

The Center for Civil Liberties (Ukrainian: Центр Громадянських Свобод, romanized: Tsentr Hromadyansʹkykh Svobod) is a Ukrainian human rights organization led by the Ukrainian lawyer Oleksandra Matviichuk. It was founded in 2007, with the purpose of pressuring Ukraine's government to make the country more democratic. The organization was awarded the 2022 Nobel Peace Prize, jointly with Ales Bialiatski and Russian organization Memorial.

== History ==
Center for Civil Liberties was founded in Kyiv, Ukraine on 30 May 2007. The organization is engaged in introducing legislative amendments in an attempt to make Ukraine more democratic and to improve the public control of law enforcement agencies and the judiciary. One of the organisation's focuses is the updating of the Criminal Code of Ukraine.

At the time of the 2013—2014 Euromaidan protests, the group started the Euromaidan SOS project to provide legal support to protesters who took part in the Euromaidan protests and to monitor abuses done by then-president Viktor Yanukovych's security forces.

After the 2014 Russian annexation of Crimea and the start of the war in Donbas (also in 2014), the organization started documenting political persecution in Crimea and crimes in the territory controlled by the Russian-backed separatist Luhansk People's Republic and Donetsk People's Republic. The organization also started international campaigns for the release of illegally imprisoned people in Russia, Russian-annexed Crimea and Donbas.

Following the 2022 Russian invasion of Ukraine, the Center for Civil Liberties also started to document Russian war crimes committed during the war. The Norwegian Nobel Committee said in 2022 that the organization was "playing a pioneering role in holding guilty parties accountable for their crimes".

On 7 October 2022, the Center for Civil Liberties was awarded the 2022 Nobel Peace Prize, jointly with Ales Bialiatski and Russian organization Memorial. This was the first ever Nobel Prize awarded to a Ukrainian citizen or organization. At the time of a 8 October 2022 press conference Center for Civil Liberties head Oleksandra Matviichuk admitted that neither Ukrainian President Volodymyr Zelenskyy nor any other (Ukrainian) government official had congratulated Center for Civil Liberties on winning the Nobel Prize. Matviichuk said that they might have tried but could have been unsuccessful because she and her colleague "were just returning from a business trip."

In November 2022 Oleksandra Matviichuk called for countries to provide Ukraine with weapons to liberate the occupied territories in Ukraine as the best way to stop the long-lasting crimes being committed by the Russian Federation.

In the spring of 2024, the Center for Civil Liberties was labeled as an "undesirable organization" in Russia.

== Name ==
According to the organization's statute, the organization's full name is Centre for Civil Liberties Civil Society Organisation and the abbreviated denomination is Centre for Civil Liberties. On its web site, the organization mostly calls itself Center for Civil Liberties.
