= Arseny Roginsky =

Soviet dissident and Russian historian

Arseny Borisovich Roginsky
- Арсений Борисович Рогинский
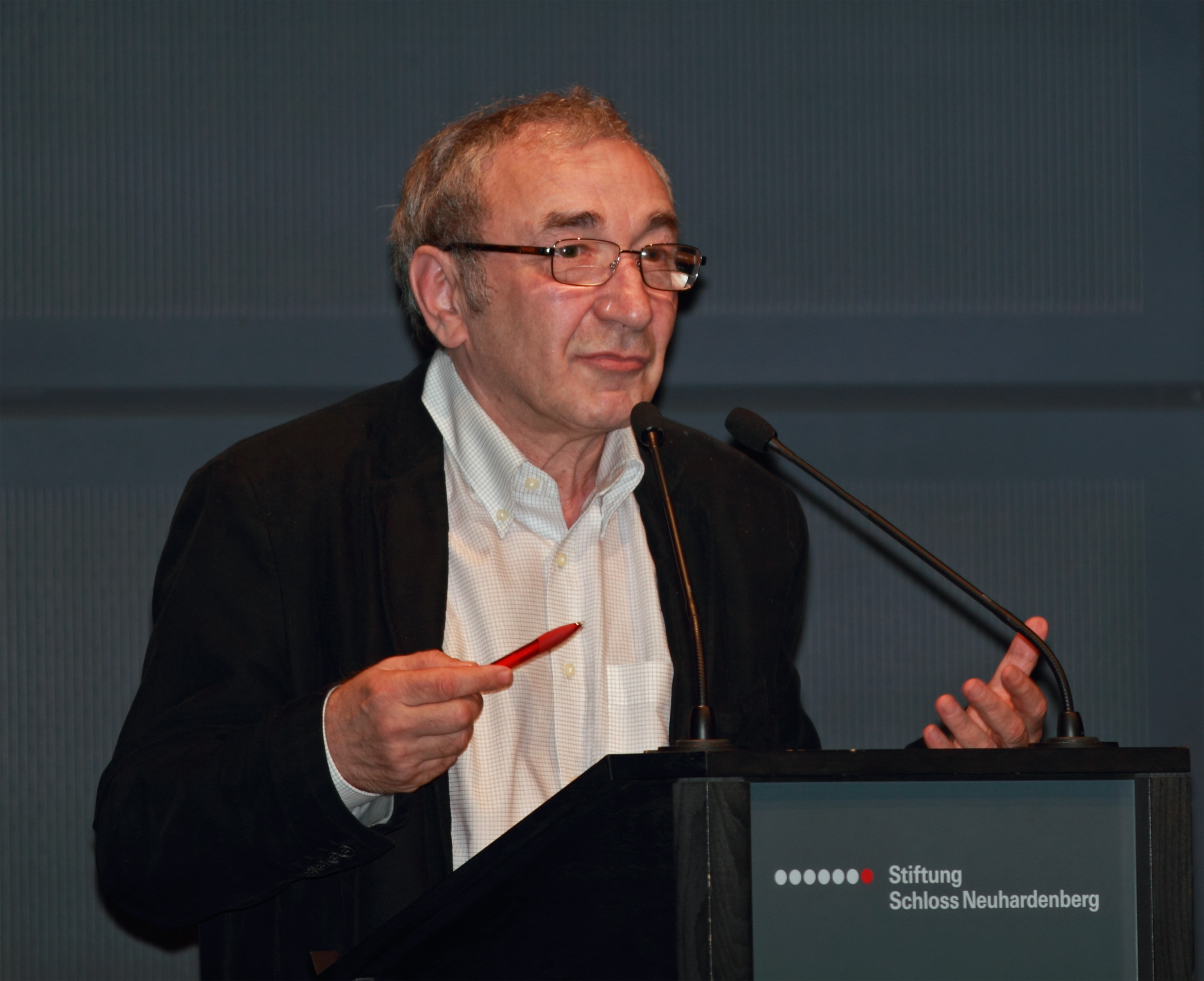
- Arseny Roginsky at the Memorial society 29 April 2012
- Born: 30 March 1946; Velsk, Arkhangelsk Oblast, RSFSR, USSR
- Died: 18 December 2017 (aged 71); Tel Aviv, Israel
- Citizenship: Soviet Union (1946–1991) → Russia (1991–2017)
- Education: University of Tartu, Estonia
- Spouse: Natalya Frumkina
- Awards: Officer's Cross of the Order of Merit of the Poland Knight's Cross of the Order of Merit of the Poland Officer's Cross of the Order of Merit of the Federal Republic of Germany Order of the Cross of Terra Mariana, Second Class
- Scientific career
- Fields: History
- Workplaces: Saltykov-Shchedrin Public Library; Memorial
- Website: www.memo.ru/en-us/

Arseny Borisovich Roginsky (Russian: Арсе́ний Бори́сович Роги́нский; 30 March 1946 – 18 December 2017) was a Soviet dissident and Russian historian. He was one of the founders of the International Historical and Civil Rights Society Memorial, and its head since 1998.

== Biography ==
Arseny Roginsky was born into a Jewish family in the town of Velsk (Arkhangelsk Region, Northwest Russia) to which, under Stalin, his father Boris had been exiled from Leningrad (today Saint Petersburg).

In 1968, he graduated from the History and Philology Faculty of the University of Tartu in Estonia, where he studied under the cultural historian Juri Lotman. (Roginsky's first publication was co-edited with the future dissident Gabriel Superfin.)

From 1968 to 1981, Roginsky lived in Leningrad and worked as a bibliographer at the Saltykov-Shchedrin Public Library, then as a teacher of Russian language and literature in evening schools. Meanwhile he studied the twentieth-century history of Russia, particularly the 1920s and the history of the destruction of the Socialist Revolutionary Party, and subsequent political repression in the Soviet Union.

=== А dissident historian ===
From 1975 to 1981, Roginsky was editor of a samizdat series of historical documents and studies called Pamyat (Memory). After 1978, it was also issued abroad. (In the early 1980s, by chance or deliberate choice, the name "Pamyat" was adopted by a far-right anti-Semitic grouping, openly active under Gorbachev. This forced Roginsky and others to adopt the title "Memorial" for the organisation to which he would devote the last 27 years of his life.)

On 4 February 1977, a search was conducted in Roginsky’s apartment. On 16 June 1977, he was warned to give up his "politically harmful" activities (in accordance with the unpublished 25 December 1972 decree of the Presidium of the Supreme Soviet). After another search on 6 March 1979, he was fired from the school where he worked at the request of the KGB. To avoid charges of "parasitism", Arseny Roginsky was registered from 1979 to 1981 as a literary secretary to the writer Natalia Dolinina and Professor Jacob Lurie.

On 12 August 1981, Roginsky was arrested under Article 196 ("the forgery and the production and sale of forged documents") of the Russian Soviet Criminal Code, and accused of transferring materials abroad to "anti-Soviet publications" such as Pamyat. At the time, historians required a letter of request from 'authorised institution' before they could gain access to a Soviet archive. As Roginsky was not employed by such an institution, he was forced to forge his own letters. As his final statement in the court, he gave a speech about "The situation of a historian in the Soviet Union", in which he essentially admitted the forgery, justifying it by explaining the extreme restrictions under which Soviet historians had to work. This speech was subsequently published by the émigré newspaper Russkaya Mysl in Paris and the samizdat periodical A Chronicle of Current Events in Moscow, and in 1983 by the Journal of the Historical Association in the United Kingdom, with an introduction by British historian Geoffrey Hosking. Roginsky was found guilty on all counts and sentenced to four years imprisonment in a forced labour camp.

=== After release ===
Roginsky served his sentence in full and was released in 1985. He was fully rehabilitated in 1992.

In 1988–1989, Roginsky was one of the founders of Memorial, the "Historical and Educational, Human Rights and Humanitarian Society" (to give its full title), which became a national movement during the perestroika years and spread across Russia and into parts of the former Soviet Union.

In 1998 Roginsky was made board chairman of Memorial and was a major influence on its development. (After his death he was succeeded by another Memorial veteran Jan Raczyinski.)

As well as his organisational and administrative activities as a board member, Roginsky continued his work as a historical researcher. He was compiler of the 1989 book, Memories of Peasant Tolstoyans, the 1910–1930s translated into English in 1993.

His skills as a historian were applied in the research that lay behind the Books of Remembrance (see below) issued by Memorial between 1995 and 2005 for places in and around Moscow where victims of political repression were buried and, latterly, executed as well: Donskoi Monastery, the Butovo firing range and Kommunarka. He also wrote about the targeting of Poles during the Great Terror and the citizens of other nations (Germans and Austrians) during Stalin's last years.

=== Assessing the Soviet past ===
In 2012, addressing a round-table discussion in Dnipropetrovsk (Ukraine), Arseny Roginsky touched on the diplomatic aspect of his work as a historian and leading figure in the Memorial Society. While the historian should work independently, in accordance with universally established methods and principles, problems might arise when presenting the results of that research to the public.

By 1994, as he told participants at the discussion of "The Historian between Reality and Memory" in Dnipropetrovsk, Roginsky had assembled and studied a vast number of reports from all over the country, about political terror in the USSR and arrests by the Soviet security services (Cheka, OGPU, NKVD and KGB). When he looked at his figures, he was concerned about their impact on people whose opinion he respected – members of the traditional intelligentsia and former prisoners of the Gulag who then still survived in large numbers. “They estimated the victims of political terror throughout Soviet history in tens of millions, quite unthinkable numbers," said Roginsky. "My calculations from surviving documents indicated that the security services across the country arrested a total of 7,100,000 people between 1918 and 1987”. The detainees were not only accused of "political" crimes, moreover, but of belonging to criminal gangs, smuggling, counterfeiting the currency and many other offences under the Criminal Code. “I put my calculations to one side. For many years. Later it would be possible to publish them. But not yet.”

The names of those arrested and shot or imprisoned by the Soviet security services would form the basis of numerous regional Books of Remembrance published in the 1990s and 2000s and, ultimately, of Memorial's own online database of "The Victims of Political Terror in the USSR" of which Roginsky was director of research. With the addition of dekulakized peasant families and other deportees the total numbers of identified and listed individuals exceeded three million.

=== Last years ===
A first attempt was made by the authorities to shut down Memorial in 2014. If Memorial was closed, commented Roginsky at the time, then the organisation's many branches would have to re-register and thereafter restore contacts across the country. Over the next two years five branches of Memorial were designated "foreign agents". On 4 October 2016 the label was applied to International Memorial headed by Roginsky. A year later on 18 December 2017 Roginsky died in Tel Aviv, Israel aged 71.

== See also ==
- Chronicle of Current Events
- Dissident
- Donskoy Monastery - the Soviet period and beyond
- Memorial (society)

== Bibliography ==
- Roginsky, Arseny; Superfin, Gabriel (1967). Русская и славянская филология. Сборник материалов XXII научной студенческой конференции [Russian and Slavic philology. A collection of materials of the 17th student research conference] (in Russian). Tartu.
- Roginskij, Arsenij; Feigelson, Kristian (January–March 1982). "Ma dernière déclaration" [My final declaration]. Cahiers du Monde Russe et Soviétique (in French). 23 (1): 123–134. JSTOR 20169949.
- Roginsky, Arseny; Gromova, Tamara, eds. (1989). Воспоминания крестьян-толстовцев, 1910–1930-е годы [Memories of peasant Tolstoyans, the 1910–1930s] (in Russian). Moscow: Kniga.
- Roginsky, Arseny; Edgerton, William, eds. (1993). Memoirs of peasant Tolstoyans in Soviet Russia. Indiana University Press. ISBN 978-0253319111.
- Borisov, Vadim; Roginsky, Arseny, eds. (1990). О Достоевском. Творчество Достоевского в русской мысли 1881–1931 годов [On Dostoevsky. Dostoyevsky's writings in Russian thought 1881–1931] (in Russian). Moscow: Kniga. ISBN 978-5212004091.
- Roginsky, Arseniy & Daniel, Alexander (2001). Нужна сеть, а не иерархия [A network, not a hierarchy, is needed]. Правозащитник (in Russian) (30): 105–109.

The Great Terror (1937-1938)

- Petrov, Nikita & Roginsky, Arseny (1997). "Польская операция НКВД 1937–1938 гг." [The Polish operation of the NKVD, 1937–1938]. In Guryanov, Alexander [Александр Гурьянов] (ed.). Репрессии против поляков и польских граждан [Repression against the Poles and Polish citizens] (in Russian). Moscow: Звенья. p. 22. ISBN 9785787000122.
- Petrov, Nikita; Roginskii, Arsenii (2003). "The "Polish operation" of the NKVD, 1937–8". In McLoughlin, Barry; McDermott, Kevin (eds.). Stalin's terror. High politics and mass repression in the Soviet Union. New York: Palgrave Macmillan. pp. 153–172. doi:10.1057/9780230523937_7. ISBN 978-1403901194.
- Eremina, Larisa & Roginsky, Arseny (2002). Расстрельные списки: Москва, 1937–1941: "Коммунарка", Бутово: книга памяти жертв политических репрессий [Lists of those shot in Moscow, 1937–1941: Kommunarka, Butovo: a Book in Remembrance of the Victims of Political Repression] (in Russian). Moscow: Memorial. ISBN 978-5787000597.
- Eremina, Larisa & Roginsky, Arseny (2005). Расстрельные списки: Москва, 1935–1953: Донское кладбище (Донской крематорий): книга памяти жертв политических репрессий [Lists of those shot in Moscow, 1935–1953: the Donskoye cemetery (the Donskoy crematorium): a Book in Remembrance of the Victims of Political Repression] (in Russian). Moscow: Memorial. ISBN 978-5787000818.

Last victims, 1950-1953

- Roginskij, Arsenij; Rudolph, Jörg; Drauschke, Frank; Kaminsky, Anne (2008). Erschossen in Moskau...: Die deutschen Opfer des Stalinismus auf dem Moskauer Friedhof Donskoje 1950–1953 [Shot in Moscow...: German victims of Stalinism at the Donskoje Moscow cemetery 1950–1953] (in German). Berlin: Metropol-Verlag; Auflage. ISBN 978-3938690147.
- Roginskij, Arsenij (2009). "Nach der Verurteilung" [After conviction]. In Karner, Stefan (ed.). Stalins letzte Opfer: verschleppte und erschossene Österreicher in Moskau, 1950–1953 [Stalin's last victims: Austrians abducted and shot in Moscow, 1950–1953] (in German). Wien: Böhlau Verlag. pp. 97–140. ISBN 978-3205782810.

Stalinism

- Roginsky, Arseny (2008). "Чем Сталин жив?" [Why is Stalin still alive?]. Kontinent (in Russian) (138).
- Roginskij, Arsenij (2009). "Fragmentierte Erinnerung : Stalin und der Stalinismus im heutigen Russland" [Fragmented memories: Stalin and Stalinism in present-day Russia] (PDF). Osteuropa (in German). 59 (1): 37–44. Archived (PDF) from the original on 3 April 2016.
- Roginskij, Arsenij (2011). "Erinnerung und Freiheit : Die Stalinismus-Diskussion in der UdSSR und Russland" [Remembrance and freedom: discussion about Stalinism in the USSR and Russia]. Osteuropa (in German). 61 (4): 55–70.

== Awards ==
- 2002: Class II Order of the Cross of Terra Mariana, Estonia, for investigating crimes against humanity
- 2005: Knight's Cross of the Order of Merit of the Republic of Poland for his efforts in uncovering truth about repressions against Polish people
- 2010: Officer's Cross of the Order of Merit of the Republic of Poland for his exceptional efforts in research in and the uncovering of the truth about the Katyn massacre
- 2010: Officer's Cross of the Order of Merit of the Federal Republic of Germany for his lengthy struggle for the truth, unprejudiced information and memory, courageous commitment to freedom and human rights as well as his strong commitment to concerns of civil society

== Videos ==
- The Right to Memory (Право на Память), 2018, in Russian; English, German, Polish and Ukrainian subtitles available, 96 min., Arseny Roginsky's account of his life.
- Arseny Roginsky's appearance on Soviet terror in Khimki, October 2014, in English, 92 min on YouTube
