= Memorial (society) =

International human rights organisation

- Мемориал
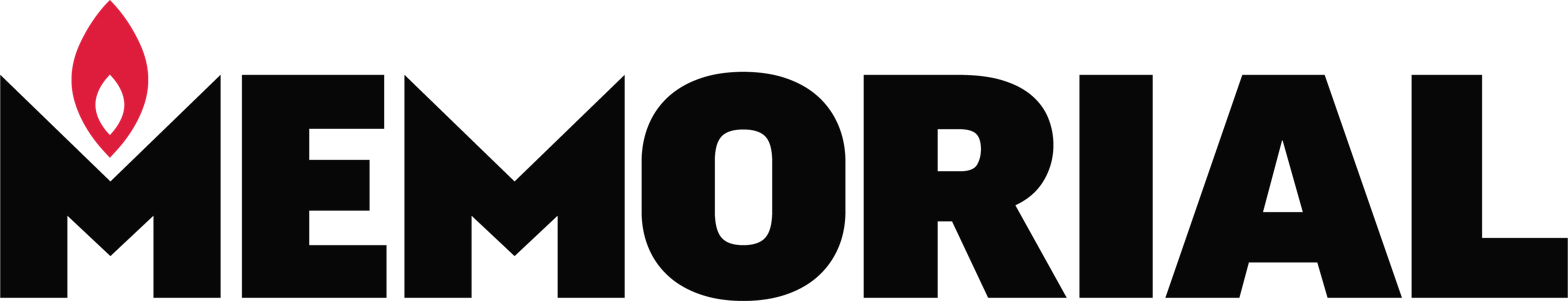
- Founded: 28 January 1989
- Dissolved: 29 December 2021 (in Russia only)
- Type: Non-profit; NGO
- Headquarters: Moscow, Russia
- Services: History of totalitarianism Protecting human rights
- Board: Štěpán Černoušek (chair), Anna Gavina, Sergey Krivenko, Irina Scherbakova, Oleg Orlov, Evgeny Zakharov
- Chairman of the HRC Council: Alexander Cherkasov
- Key people: List: Andrei Sakharov (1921–1989); Arseny Roginsky (1946–2017); Sergei Kovalev (1930–2021)
- Awards: List: Right Livelihood Award (2004); Nansen Refugee Award (2004); Hermann Kesten Prize (2008); Sakharov Prize (2009); Victor Gollancz Prize (2009); "Freedom of Expression Prize" Index on Censorship (2012); "The Guardian of National Memory" Award from Polish Institute of National Memory (2012); Pax Christi International Peace Award (2013); Nobel Peace Prize (2022)
- Website: International Memorial Association (in English); Human Rights Defence Centre (in English)

Memorial (Russian: Мемориал, IPA: [mʲɪmərʲɪˈaɫ]) is an international human rights organisation founded in Russia during the fall of the Soviet Union to study and examine the human rights violations and other crimes committed under Joseph Stalin's reign. Subsequently, it expanded the scope of its research to cover the entire Soviet period. Memorial is the recipient of numerous awards, among others the Nobel Peace Prize in 2022.

Prior to its dissolution in Russia in early 2022, it consisted of two separate legal entities, Memorial International, whose purpose was the recording of the crimes against humanity committed in the Soviet Union, particularly during the Stalinist era, and the Memorial Human Rights Centre, which focused on the protection of human rights, especially in conflict zones in and around modern Russia. A movement rather than a unitary system, as of December 2021 Memorial encompassed over 50 organizations in Russia and 11 in other countries, including Kazakhstan, Ukraine, Germany, Italy, Belgium and France. Although the focus of affiliated groups differs from region to region, they share similar concerns about human rights, documenting the past, educating young people and marking remembrance days for the victims of political repression.

Memorial emerged during the perestroika years of the late 1980s, to document the crimes against humanity committed in the USSR during the 20th century and help surviving victims of the Great Terror and the Gulag and their families. Between 1987 and 1990, while the USSR was still in existence, 23 branches of the society were established. When the Soviet Union collapsed, branches of Memorial in Ukraine remained affiliated to the Russian network. Some of the oldest branches of Memorial in northwest and central Russia; the Urals and Siberia later developed websites documenting independent local research and published the crimes of the Soviet regime in their region.

After the Russian foreign agent law was passed in July 2012, Memorial came under increasing government pressure. On 21 July 2014, the Memorial Human Rights Centre was declared a "foreign agent" by the Ministry of Justice. The label was extended in November 2015 to the Research & Information Centre at St. Petersburg Memorial, and on 4 October 2016 to Memorial International itself. On 28 December 2021, the Supreme Court of Russia ordered Memorial International to close for violations of the foreign agent law. A lawyer for Memorial said it would appeal. The Memorial Human Rights Centre (HRC) was ordered shut by the Moscow City Court on 29 December 2021; state prosecutors accused it of breaching the foreign agent law and supporting terrorism and extremism. On the same day, the European Court of Human Rights applied an interim measure instructing Russia to halt the forced dissolution of Memorial, pending the outcome of litigation.

On 29 December 2021, Memorial HRC as a legal entity in Russia was closed and liquidated by the Moscow City Court for violating the foreign agent law. On 5 April 2022, the Russian Court of Appeal confirmed the dissolution. Some of Memorial's human rights activities continued in Russia. Memorial continues to operate in other countries, notably in Germany, where its oldest and largest non-Russian chapter is based. In October 2022, Memorial was one of the three laureates of that year's Nobel Peace Prize, alongside Ukrainian human rights organisation Centre for Civil Liberties and Belarusian activist Ales Bialiatski, for their efforts in "document[ing] war crimes, human rights abuses, and the abuse of power".

== Early history and predecessors ==
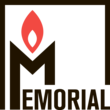
An older logo of Memorial

Memorial's creation was a response to growing public awareness of historic abuses within the Soviet Union (USSR) during the 1980s, as well as concern about contemporary human rights, especially in certain hotspots around the USSR. This took place within the context of perestroika (reconstruction) and glasnost (openness), policies pursued by president Mikhail Gorbachev which led to increased government transparency and tolerance of civil society. An earlier statement of the goals later pursued by the Memorial Society was made by Brezhnev era dissidents in February 1974, following the deportation of dissident writer Aleksandr Solzhenitsyn from the USSR. They called for publication in the USSR of Solzhenitsyn's The Gulag Archipelago, the opening of all secret police archives relating to the past, and the organization of an international tribunal to examine the crimes of the Soviet secret police.

Some of these goals became feasible in the late 1980s when several activists such as Lev Ponomaryov, Yuri Samodurov, Vyacheslav Igrunov, Dmitry Leonov, and Arseny Roginsky proposed a complex to commemorate the victims of Stalinism. Their concept included a monument, a museum, an archive, and a library. An "all-Union informal movement" organized and submitted a petition to the 19th All-Union Conference of the Communist Party of the Soviet Union (CPSU) in 1988, and that body supported Politburo proposals for the creation of a monument to the victims of political repression during the cult of personality under Stalin. A similar decision by the 22nd Congress of the CPSU in 1961 had been ignored for many years.

A significant juncture in Memorial's development was its Moscow conference on 29–30 October 1988. After the failure of officialdom to force the postponement of the conference, it gathered 338 delegates from 57 cities and towns. In a report to the Politburo dated 16 November the new KGB head, Vladimir Kryuchkov, observed that 66% of the delegates came from Moscow and the Moscow Region. Kryuchkov decried "provocative statements" made by dissidents and young activists during the two-day event.

Secretaries of several creative unions (architects, designers, artists and filmmakers) were present as potential trustees of the proposed organization. More radical voices were also heard, including those of the Moscow Popular Front, the newly founded Democratic Union, and uncensored periodicals such as Glasnost and Express Chronicle. Members of the Moscow Action Group of Memorial were among the radicals. The conference was addressed by dissidents Larisa Bogoraz and Elena Bonner (wife of dissident scientist Andrei Sakharov), and by the octogenarian writer Oleg Volkov, an early inmate of the Gulag's Solovki camp. In a report to the Politburo, KGB head Kryuchkov singled out Arseny Roginsky, future chairman (1998–2017) of International Memorial, as particularly outspoken. Memorial should become an heir to the Helsinki Groups of the late Soviet period, said Roginsky, and he named the Chronicle of Current Events (1968–1982) and its compilers as a model to be emulated.

Memorial was founded on 26–28 January 1989 as a "historical and educational" society at a conference held in the Moscow Aviation Institute. Two years later a distinct Memorial Civil Rights Defense Center was also set up. In a random poll conducted on the streets of Moscow, respondents named many whom they thought suitable candidates for the Memorial Society's board of trustees. The second most popular was Andrei Sakharov, who had won a Nobel Peace Prize in 1975 for his efforts to promote civil liberties within the Soviet Union; Sakharov became the first Memorial chairman. The exiled Solzhenitsyn was also named but he declined the invitation, saying he could do little to help from abroad; in private, he told Sakharov that the scope of the project should not be restricted to the Stalin era because repressive measures had begun with the October Revolution under Vladimir Lenin.

On 6 July 1989, Memorial organized its first public event by picketing the Chinese Embassy in Moscow in protest over the Tiananmen Square Massacre. Memorial was not formally recognized until 1990 when the organization acquired official status. On 19 April 1992, after the dissolution of the Soviet Union, Memorial was reconstituted as an International NGO, a "historical, educational, human rights and charitable society", with organizations in several post-Soviet states (Russia, Ukraine, Kazakhstan, Latvia, and Georgia), as well as in Germany, the Czech Republic, Italy, and France.

== Mission and activities ==
According to its post-Soviet 1992 charter, Memorial pursued the following aims:

- To promote mature civil society and democracy based on the rule of law and thus prevent a return to totalitarianism;
- To assist the formation of public awareness based on the values of democracy and law, to extirpate totalitarian patterns [of thought and behaviour], and to firmly establish human rights in everyday politics and public life;
- To promote the truth about the historical past and perpetuate the memory of the victims of political repression carried out by totalitarian regimes.

Its online database contains details of the victims of political repression in the USSR; the fifth version contains over three million names, although Memorial estimated that 75% of victims had not yet been identified and recorded.

Memorial organized assistance, both legal and financial, for the victims of the Gulag. It conducts research into the history of political repression and shares the findings in books, articles, exhibitions, museums, and the websites of its member organizations.

=== Day of Remembrance ===
Moscow Memorial was among the organisations that persuaded the Russian authorities to follow the long-standing dissident tradition of marking 30 October each year, transforming it into an official Day of Remembrance of the Victims of Political Repressions. Over the next thirty years this date was adopted across Russia: by 2016 annual events were held on 30 October at 103 of the 411 burial grounds and commemorative sites included on the "Russia's Necropolis" website.

Memorial worked on the law "On Rehabilitation of Victims of Political Repression".

=== Research and education ===
Throughout its existence, but particularly since 2012, the International Memorial Society has widened its range of activities. Today these include the Last Address project and, following the example of Berlin and its Topography of Terror excursions and exhibitions, the society has organised similar educational ventures about the Soviet era in Moscow and other Russian cities.

==== Archives and online database ====
In 2005, Memorial's database contained records of more than 1,300,000 victims of political repression in the Soviet Union. First issued as a CD, by 2020 the fifth edition of the database was available online and held over three million entries of those shot, imprisoned or deported during the Soviet period.

Another project is the "Open List" database, created in several languages of the former Soviet Union (Russian, Ukrainian, Georgian and Belarusian) to encourage relatives and descendants of those shot, imprisoned and deported to contribute information about the victims and their families. This expanded sources of information beyond the case files kept on individuals by the Soviet security services or the police.

Memorial's archives have been used by historians such as Briton Orlando Figes.

==== School programmes ====
Since 1999, Memorial has organised an annual competition for secondary school students around the theme of "The Individual and History: Russia in the 20th century". It received between 1,500 and 2,000 entries each year. Authors of the 40 best contributions are invited to Moscow to attend a special school academy and the awards ceremony. The jury has been headed in the past by Otto Sigurd, Svetlana Aleksiyevich and Ludmila Ulitskaya. To date, 26 collections of winning entries have been published: the majority of these can be found on the "Lessons of History" website.

==== The Katyn Massacres ====
Memorial had a special Polish programme headed by Aleksandr Gurianov. Together with the Polish KARTA Center, the Memorial Polish programme researched the mass executions of nearly 22,000 Polish military officers and soldiers, policemen, officials, intelligentsia and others conducted at Stalin's order by the NKVD in Katyn, Kalinin, Kharkiv, Kyiv and probably near Minsk in April and May 1940. The result of this research are four publications on the murders, all edited by Gurianov: one volume on Katyn, where NKVD officers murdered at least 4,400 regular army officers and reserve officers; and three volumes on Kalinin, were 6,300 policemen and prison guards and border guards were shot dead. Both titles contain an introduction on the crime and the exhumations, and a roll-call of the respective victims with biogram and picture, where available. They are based on analogous Polish publications, but include additional information on the Katyn Massacre and expanded biograms.

The four publications are:

Gurianov Aleksandr, ed. Those Killed in Katyn. The Memorial Book of Polish Prisoners of War – Prisoners of the Kozelsk NKVD Camp, Shot Dead at the Order of the Politburo of the Bolshevic Communist Party from 5 March 1940 Onwards (Moscow 2015), with 4 415 biograms of the victims.

Gurianov Aleksandr, ed. Those Killed in Kalinin, buried in Mednoye. The Memorial Book of Polish Prisoners of War – Prisoners of the Ostashkov Soviet NKVD Camp, Shot Dead at the Order of the Politburo of the Bolshevic Communist Party from 5 March 1940 Onwards (Moscow 2019)

- Vol. 1, "The Biograms of Polish POWs. A-L"
- Vol. 2, "The Biograms of Polish POWs. M-Ya"
- Vol. 3, "What do we Know about Mednoye"

Both titles were launched on 17 September, to the date on the anniversary of the Soviet invasion of Poland: the book on Katyn in 2015, on the 75th anniversary; and the three volumes on Mednoye on the 80th anniversary, in 2019.

Memorial was planning to continue the project and publish a volume on the Katyn Massacre committed at the Kharkov Regional Directorate of the NKVD, however the events after 2019 (the COVID-19 pandemic and the policy pursued by the Russian Federation after its invasion of Ukraine, including the closure of Memorial) made this impossible as of 2024.

==== "Virtual Gulag" museum and Russia's Necropolis website ====
In the early 21st century, Memorial in St. Petersburg worked to create the "Virtual Gulag" Museum in order to bring together research and archives from all over the former Soviet Union and to commemorate and record the existence of the Gulag and the lives of its inmates.

Disrupted by the 2008 seizure in St. Petersburg of much of the materials on which the project was based (see § Persecution for further information), and faced with a need to update the information (and the technology), it was decided to create a map of the burial grounds, graveyards and commemorative sites across Russia. Launched in Russian in 2016, an English-language version, "Russia's Necropolis of Terror and the Gulag" followed in August 2021. This resource documents over 400 sites, some dating back to the Russian Civil War, noting their state of preservation, monuments and ceremonies, and whether they have protected status. It includes the killing fields of the Great Purge such as Krasny Bor, the abandoned burial grounds of the Gulag, and also 138 graveyards of the "special" settlements to which "dekulakized" peasant families and then Poles, Lithuanians and others were deported in their tens of thousands.

At the Kovalevsky Woods near St. Petersburg, Memorial attempted to construct a National Memorial Museum Complex to commemorate the 4,500 victims who were killed and buried there during the Red Terror. Memorial workers discovered the bodies in 2002. A memorial complex already exists at the Sandarmokh killing field (1937–1938) in Karelia, thanks to the efforts of Yury A. Dmitriev.

In July 1997, a joint expedition of the St. Petersburg and Karelian Memorial Societies led by Dmitriev, Irina Flige, and Veniamin Joffe found 236 common graves containing the bodies of at least 6,000 victims of Stalin–era purges, executed in 1937 and 1938. In 2016, the Russian government attempted to revise this account, claiming that among the dead were Soviet POWs shot by invading Finns in 1941–1944. Memorial representatives challenged both the motivation behind this claim and the purported new evidence intended to support it.

==== A Chronicle of Current Events (1968–1982) ====
In 2008, Memorial HRC launched an online version of the noted samizdat publication A Chronicle of Current Events, which had been distributed in the Soviet Union. Appearing at irregular intervals during the year, it was circulated in typescript form (samizdat) in the USSR from 1968 to 1983. All of its 63 issues were also translated into English and published abroad. Western observers and scholars considered it to be a key source of trustworthy information about human rights in the post-Stalin Soviet Union.

The launch of the online version was held at Memorial's office in Karetny. Many former editors of the underground publication attended, including Sergei Kovalev and Alexander Lavut.

=== Media ===
Memorial has funded or helped to produce various publications and films related to human rights. This included the documentary The Crying Sun (2007), which focused on the village of Zumsoy in Chechnya, and the struggle of its citizens to preserve their cultural identity in the face of military raids and enforced disappearances by the Russian army and 'guerilla' fighters. The 25-minute film was produced in collaboration with WITNESS.

== International Memorial outside Russia ==
International Memorial has branches in several European countries.

Memorial Germany was founded in 1993 in Berlin to support the organization in Russia. Over time it has become an independent human rights organization based in Germany. Memorial Italia has been operating since 2004. Memorial Belgium was founded in 2007.

Later, branches of the International Memorial were also set up in the Czech Republic (2016) and most recently a French branch came into existence in April 2020.

In eastern and southern Ukraine, as noted earlier (§), Memorial organisations set up during the late Soviet period have remained affiliated with the Russian network. A noted centre for work both on historical materials and current human rights concerns is the Kharkiv Human Rights Protection Group, an affiliate organisation since February 1989, which today runs the "Human Rights in Ukraine" portal.

During the Russian invasion of Ukraine, Memorial, in addition to the fate of victims of political repression in modern Russia, also studies the fates of Ukrainian prisoners of war.

== Awards and nominations ==
In 2004, the Memorial Human Rights Centre (HRC) was among the four recipients of the Right Livelihood Award, for its work in documenting violations of human rights in Russia and other former states in the USSR. Quoting the RLA jury: "for showing, under very difficult conditions, and with great personal courage, that history must be recorded and understood, and human rights respected everywhere if sustainable solutions to the legacy of the past are to be achieved."

In the same year, the United Nations High Commissioner for Refugees (UNHCR) named Memorial HRC as the winner of the annual Nansen Refugee Award for its wide range of services on behalf of forced migrants and internally displaced people in the Russian Federation, as well as refugees from Africa, Asia and the Middle East.

In 2008, Memorial won the Hermann Kesten Prize. In 2009, Memorial won the Sakharov Prize of the European Union, in memory of murdered Memorial activist Natalya Estemirova. Announcing the award, President of the European Parliament Jerzy Buzek said that the assembly hoped "to contribute to ending the circle of fear and violence surrounding human rights defenders in the Russian Federation". Oleg Orlov, a board member of Memorial, commented that the prize represents "much-needed moral support at a difficult time for rights activists in Russia". A cash reward, which comes with the prize, of €50,000 was awarded to Memorial in December 2009.

The writer and historian Irina Scherbakowa, a founder and staff member of Memorial, was given the Ossietzky Award and the Goethe Medal for her work relating to Memorial's activities.

In 2009, Memorial HRC was awarded the Victor Gollancz Prize by the Society for Threatened Peoples.

In 2012, Memorial was awarded the Custodian of National Memory prize by the Institute of National Remembrance.

On 4 February 2015, Lech Wałęsa nominated Memorial International for the 2014 Nobel Peace Prize.

Memorial was awarded the 2022 Nobel Peace Prize along with Belarusian human rights activist Ales Bialiatski and the Ukrainian human rights organisation Centre for Civil Liberties. Berit Reiss-Andersen, the head of the Norwegian Nobel Committee, stated that the recipients "have made an outstanding effort to document war crimes, human rights abuses and the abuse of power", however the committee stated that the choice was not made against Putin, who launched an invasion of Ukraine in February of that year.

Memorial also received the 2022 Organization for Security and Co-operation in Europe Democracy Defender Award, jointly with Ukrainian Human Rights Centre ZMINA, for courageous and important efforts to promote human rights and democracy.

== Recent operations ==
=== International Memorial ===
In April 2021, Memorial researchers Sergei Krivenko and Sergei Prudovsky published a study of the "national" operations conducted by the NKVD during the Great Terror, 1937–1938. Examining the available documents, they noted that the FSB, successor to the NKVD and KGB, had not fulfilled the terms of a June 1992 edict issued by President Boris Yeltsin. This demanded that all legislative acts and other documentation that "served as the basis for mass repressive measures and violations of human rights" should be declassified and made publicly available within three months. The Great Terror involved "crimes against humanity" and was therefore subject to no statute of limitation. In 1968, the USSR acceded to the UN Convention on the Non-Applicability of Statutory Limitations to War Crimes and Crimes Against Humanity. Decades later, and thirty years after the 1992 presidential edict, the researchers were filing cases in the courts to pressure regional branches of the FSB to release documents about the Great Terror over 80 years earlier. Krivenko was an academic and a founding member of Memorial, while Prudovsky began by researching the fate of his grandfather and has spent the last ten years on a wide-ranging study of political repression in the 1930s.

=== Memorial Human Rights Centre ===
The growing list of prisoners of conscience and political prisoners in Russia (the Memorial Human Rights Centre issued a list of 377 names on 9 November 2021) reflected the link always drawn by Memorial between past atrocities and present-day violations of human rights. This referred, on the one hand, to hotspots around the Soviet Union and Russia, the two wars in Chechnya, conflicts with neighbouring countries, especially Georgia and Ukraine, and, on the other hand, to the regime within Russia under Vladimir Putin and his administration.

== Persecution ==
In the 1990s, Memorial researchers gained access to central FSB archives and many significant documents about collectivisation, the Gulag and the Great Terror were found and published. Outside the capital, the situation across the country varied considerably. After the third-term re-election of Vladimir Putin in 2012, civil society as a whole and Memorial, in particular, were increasingly out of favour. Memorial's chronicling of historic purges frequently conflicted with Putin's attempts to venerate Soviet history.

=== Confiscation of the digital archive, 2008 ===
On 4 December 2008, Memorial's St. Petersburg office was raided by the authorities. Officers confiscated 11 computer hard disks containing 20 years of research. The information was being used to develop "a universally accessible database with hundreds of thousands of names." Director Irina Flige thought Memorial was being targeted because it was on the wrong side of Putinism, specifically the idea "that Stalin and the Soviet regime were successful in creating a great country".

The raid was supposedly related to a xenophobic article in a June 2007 issue of the Novy Peterburg newspaper. Memorial denied any link to the publication. Some human rights lawyers in Russia speculated that the raid was a retaliation for the St. Petersburg Memorial screening of the banned film Rebellion: the Litvinenko Case (2007), which is about the murder of Russian ex-spy Alexander Litvinenko in Great Britain in 2006.

Allison Gill, director of Human Rights Watch in Moscow, said, "This outrageous police raid shows the poisonous climate for non-governmental organisations in Russia [...] This is an overt attempt by the Russian government [...] to silence critical voices". Academics from all over the world signed an open letter to then-President Dmitry Medvedev that condemned the seizure of disks and material. The United States declared itself "deeply concerned" about the raid: State Department spokesman Sean McCormack said, "Unfortunately, this action against Memorial is not an isolated instance of pressure against freedom of association and expression in Russia".

On 20 March 2009, the city's Dzerzhinsky district court ruled that the December 2008 search and confiscation of 12 HDDs were carried out with procedural violations; the actions of law enforcement bodies were illegal. Eventually, the 12 hard drives, plus optical discs and some papers, were returned to Memorial in 2009.

=== Chechnya and the North Caucasus, 1994–2018 ===
Activists linked to Memorial played a key role during the first Chechen conflict (1994–1996) when Russia's human rights ombudsman Sergei Kovalyov spent days in Grozny under bombardment by federal aviation. They moved between the two sides of the conflict, searching for the missing and arranging exchanges of those killed during the fighting.

It became much harder for human rights activists to act impartially during the second Chechen conflict (1999–2005). Memorial's office in Grozny was frequently raided by the authorities. Memorial activist Natalia Estemirova, a close colleague of the murdered journalist Anna Politkovskaya (1958–2006), investigated murders and abductions in Chechnya until she herself was kidnapped in Grozny and shot dead in neighbouring Ingushetia on 15 July 2009. BBC reporters suggested her death was connected to her investigations of government-backed militias in the country. Three days later, Memorial suspended its activities in Chechnya, stating "We cannot risk the lives of our colleagues even if they are ready to carry on their work."

Oleg Orlov, a Memorial board member with experience in the North Caucasus, accused Chechen president Ramzan Kadyrov of being behind the murder, and claimed that Kadyrov had openly threatened her. Kadyrov denied his involvement and sued Memorial for defamation, naming Orlov specifically in his complaint. Several years later the case was yet to be resolved.

On 17 January 2018, masked arsonists set fire to Memorial's North Caucasus office in Nazran, Ingushetia.

=== "Foreign agent" status, 2014–2020 ===
According to the 2012 foreign agent law, "groups must register with the Justice Ministry as "foreign agents" if they receive even a minimal amount of funding from any foreign sources, governmental or private, and engage in 'political activity'". The first part of Memorial to be declared a "foreign agent" was its Moscow-based Human Rights Centre in July 2014. The following year, the Ministry of Justice designated the Research & Information Centre at St. Petersburg Memorial, two Memorial organisations in Yekaterinburg and another one in Ryazan "foreign agents". On 4 October 2016, the law requiring organizations that accepted funds from abroad and engaged in "political activities" to register and declare themselves as a "foreign agent" was applied to Memorial International.

Memorial HRC and International Memorial disputed this designation of their status in the courts and, having exhausted such legal recourse with the Russian judicial system, applied to the European Court of Human Rights (ECHR) in Strasbourg. The Research & Information Centre at Petersburg Memorial declared that it would continue its work and projects but "did not intend to mark all its publications with such a stamp", designating it a foreign agent. It informed, "all interested persons that RIC Memorial's public activities would be continued by the Joffe Foundation".

In its 2015 annual "foreign agent" audit, Russia's Ministry of Justice accused the Memorial Human Rights Centre of "undermining the foundations of the constitutional order of the Russian Federation" and of calling for "a change of political regime" in the country.

Memorial International's designation as a "foreign agent" was part of the State's ongoing battle with NGOs and civil society. By autumn 2019, Memorial and its new chairman, Yan Rachinsky, faced fines of 3,700,000 roubles for infringing the terms of the foreign agent law: a sum that was raised through crowdfunding. In 2020, Memorial submitted a complaint to the ECHR about excessive fines and harassment.

=== Intimidation and order to close, 2021 ===
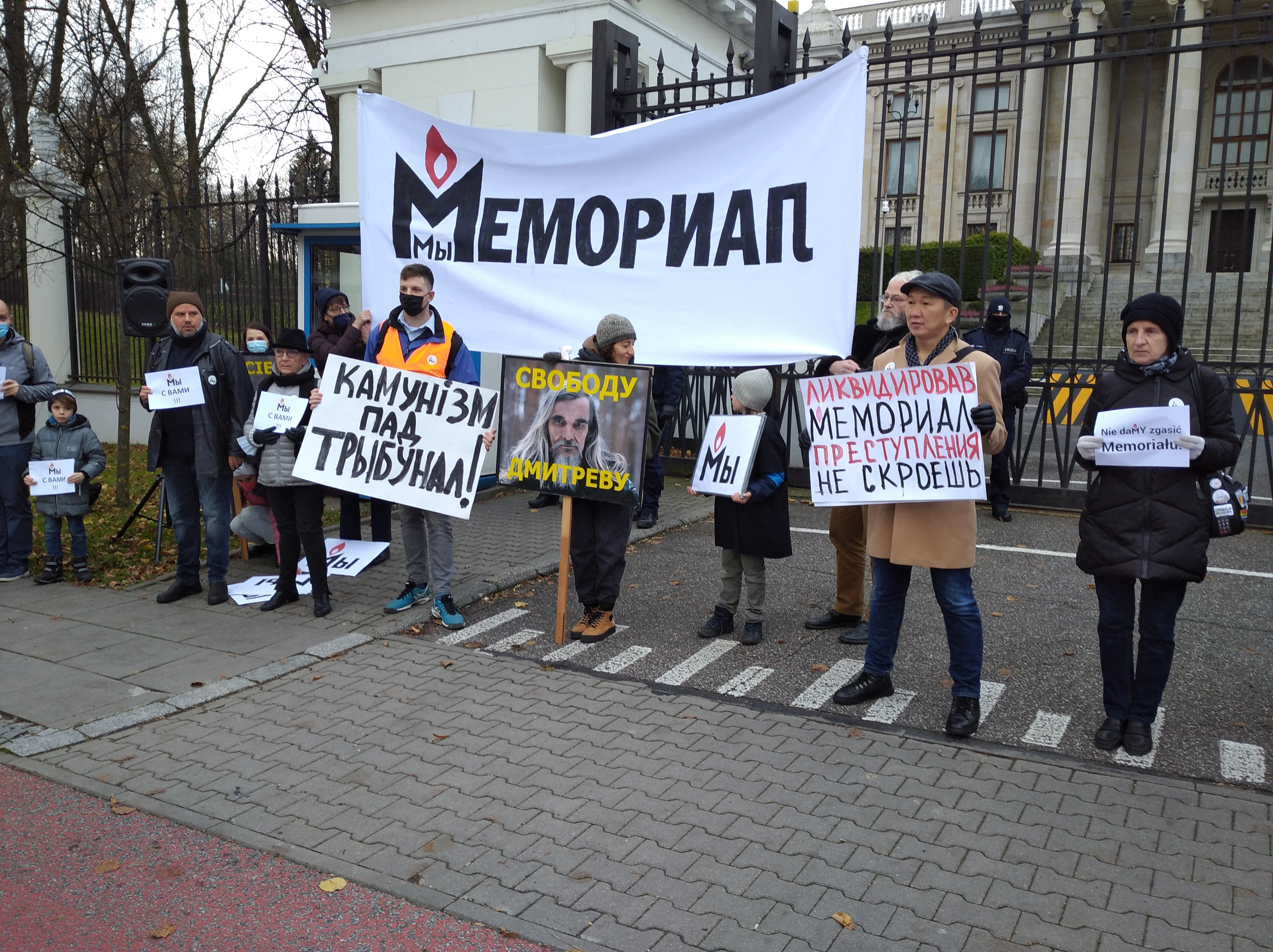
Protest in defense of the Memorial in Warsaw, Poland, 21 November 2021

On 14 October 2021, around 20 men broke into the Moscow offices of Memorial and interrupted a public film screening of Mr Jones with hostile chants. Memorial staff called the police, but by the time the officers arrived most of the intruders had dispersed, and police led away the three who remained. Then, without explanation, the police shut the people who had been watching the film in the Memorial building and held them there for hours, late into the night. Everyone was forced to provide full personal details from their passports, their residential address and phone number, as well as information about their education, workplace, and work title.

The first calls for the closure of Memorial were made in 2014 by Minister of Justice Aleksandr Konovalov in an application to the Supreme Court. If Memorial was closed, commented its chairman Arseny Roginsky, then the organisation's many branches would have to re-register and thereafter restore contacts with one another across the country. In January 2015, the Court announced that it would not uphold the Ministry's request.

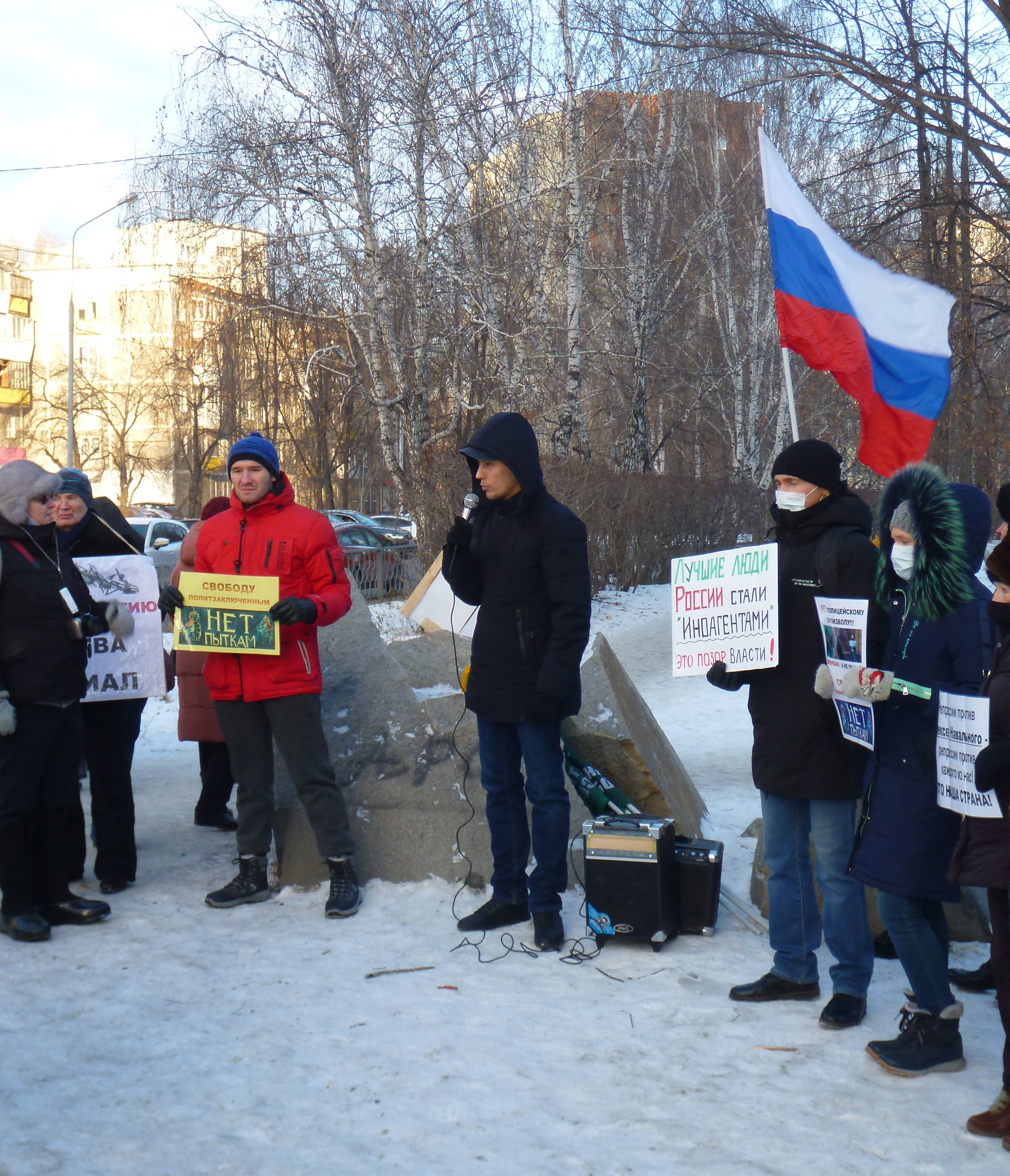
Protest in defense of the Memorial in Yekaterinburg, Russia, 12 December 2021

On 11 November 2021, the Russian Prosecutor General's Office announced that it had submitted a lawsuit to the Supreme Court, seeking to close Memorial International over violations of the Russian foreign agent law. The following day, it became known that the Moscow City Prosecutor's Office filed a lawsuit with the Moscow City Court requesting the closure of the Memorial Human Rights Centre. The lawsuits would be heard on 26 and 23 November, respectively. More than 120,000 people signed a petition to save the group.

On 28 December 2021, the Supreme Court of Russia ordered the International Memorial Society and its regional branches to close because it had violated the 2012 foreign agent law. During the court hearing, state prosecutor Zhafyarov accused Memorial of "creating a false image of the Soviet Union as a terrorist state" and "making us repent for the Soviet past, instead of remembering glorious history [...] probably because someone is paying for it". A lawyer for Memorial said it would appeal against the decision in both Russian courts and the European Court of Human Rights (ECHR) in Strasbourg, which has jurisdiction over Russia. The following day, the Moscow City Court announced its decision to shut down the Memorial Human Rights Centre. Video clips covering the harassment, trial, and closure of Memorial are shown in a 2024 documentary, Of Caravan and the Dogs.

Like most independent Russian media and rights bodies, Memorial is now "forced to operate outside the country, and some of memorial's activists have been jailed. But the body continues to campaign vocally on social media, and the Nobel Prize committee hailed its efforts to document war crimes and other abuses of power."

In February 2024, Memorial's co-chair, Oleg Orlov, was sentenced to two years in prison having been convicted of "repeatedly discrediting" the Russian military.

In February 2026, the Russian authorities declared the German and Swiss legal entities of Memorial "undesirable organizations". On 9 April, the Supreme Court of Russia designated Memorial as an extremist organization. The court hearing was held behind closed doors, with no lawyer representing Memorial permitted to participate in the proceedings. In response to the ruling, Memorial announced that it was ceasing all operations in Russia, but would continue to work outside the country.

== International response to the threat of closure ==
On 29 December, the UN Human Rights Office in Geneva described the Russian courts' rulings as "further weaken[ing] the country's dwindling human rights community". This was followed by the application of an emergency interim measure by the European Court of Human Rights (ECHR), ordering the Russian government to halt the abolition of the two organisations. As of December 2021, both organisations were party to a pre-existing ECHR complaint concerning the Russian foreign agent law.

On 31 December 2021, a joint statement was released by the European Union, the United States, Australia, Canada, and the United Kingdom criticising the Russian courts' decisions to shut Memorial and calling on Russia "to uphold its international human rights obligations and commitments".

== See also ==
- Day of Remembrance, 30 October each year
- Kommunarka "firing range"
- Last Address project
- Arseny Roginsky
- Sandarmokh forest and memorial
- Solovki "special" prison
- Solovetsky Stone, Moscow
- Topography of Terror excursions
