= Persecution of Buddhists =

Many adherents of Buddhism have experienced religious persecution because of their adherence to the Buddhist practice, including unwarranted arrests, imprisonment, beating, torture, and/or execution. The term also may be used in reference to the confiscation or destruction of property, temples, monasteries, centers of learning, meditation centers, historical sites, or the incitement of hatred towards Buddhists.

== Pre-modern persecutions of Buddhism ==
=== Sasanian Empire ===
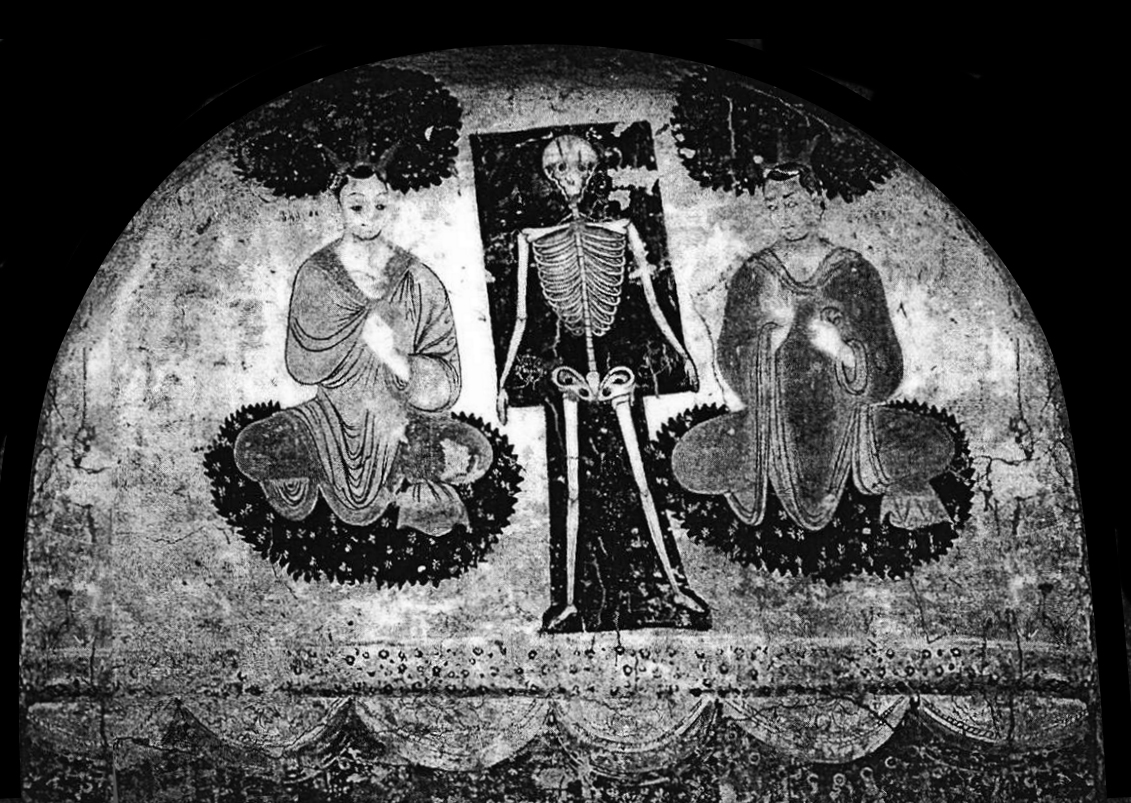
Painting of an underground meditation chamber's lunette. The Sarvāstivādin vihāra of Tapa Shotor, period VI (350–450).

In the 3rd century, the Sasanian Empire overran Bactria, overthrowing the Kushan Empire. Although strong supporters of Zoroastrianism, the Sasanians tolerated Buddhism and allowed the construction of more vihāras. It was during their rule that Lokottaravādins erected the two Buddhas of Bamiyan.

During the second half of the third century, Kartir, the Zoroastrian mowbadān-mowbad of the Empire, dominated the state's official religious policy. He ordered the destruction of several Buddhist monasteries in Afghanistan, since the amalgam of Buddhism and Zoroastrianism manifested in the form of Buddha-Mazda appeared to him as heresy. Buddhism quickly recovered after his death.

=== Hepthalites ===
Central Asian and Northwestern Indian Buddhism weakened following the Hephthalites invasion, who followed traditional religious practices as well as Manichaeism. Around 440, they conquered Sogdia then conquered Gandhara and pushed on into the Indo-Gangetic Plain.

=== Hun invasions (6th century) ===
Chinese scholars traveling through the region between the 5th and 8th centuries, such as Faxian, Xuanzang, Yijing, Hui-sheng, and Sung-Yun, began to speak of a decline of the Buddhist Sangha in the Northwestern parts of the Indian subcontinent, especially in the wake of the Hun invasion from central Asia in the 6th century CE. Xuanzang wrote that numerous monasteries in north-western India had been reduced to ruins by the Huns.

The Alchon Hun ruler Mihirakula, who ruled from 515 CE in the north-western region (modern Afghanistan, Pakistan and north India), suppressed Buddhism as well. He did this by destroying monasteries as far away as modern-day Prayagraj.

== Persecution under Hindus ==
=== In India ===
D N Jha claims, based on the Rajatarangini exclusively, that persecution of Buddhists took place in the time of King Gonandiya-Ashoka (different from King Ashoka of the Mauryan Empire). Jha writes that according to a book Rajatarangini, dated to the 12th century, Jalauka was a Shaivite and was responsible for the destruction of many Buddhist monasteries. The story of Jalauka is essentially legendary and no independent corroboration of the Kashmir tradition has ever been discovered. Moreover, the Rajatarangini itself places Gonandiya-Ashoka in the second millennium BCE and Romila Thapar equates him with Kunala, who also lived in the 3rd Century BCE, while the Rajatarangini is a 12th-Century text.

King Pushyamitra Shunga allegedly persecuted Buddhists in North India, a claim that has been continuously refuted by many historians for several reasons, and on various grounds. A non-contemporary Buddhist text states that Pushyamitra cruelly persecuted Buddhists (The text belongs to centuries after Pushyamitra Shunga's period). While some scholars believe he did persecute Buddhists based on the Buddhist accounts most consider them biased because of him not patronising them. Many scholars have expressed skepticism about the Buddhist claims on the whole. Étienne Lamotte points out that the Buddhist legends are not consistent about the location of Pushyamitra's anti-Buddhist campaign and his death: "To judge from the documents, Pushyamitra must be acquitted through lack of proof." Agreeing with him, D. Devahuti states that Pushyamitra's sudden destruction after offering rewards for Buddhist heads is "manifestly false". R. C. Mitra states that "The tales of persecution by Pushyamitra as recorded in Divyavadana and by Taranatha bear marks of evident absurdity."

The Asokavadana legend has been likened to a Buddhist version of Pushyamitra's attack on the Mauryas, reflecting the declining influence of Buddhism in the Shunga Imperial court. The decline of Buddhism in India did not set in until the Gupta dynasty. According to other scholars, the Shunga kings were seen as more amenable to Buddhism, and as having contributed to the building of the stupa at Bharhut and an inscription at Bodh Gaya at the Mahabodhi Temple records the construction of the temple as follows, "The gift of Nagadevi the wife of King Brahmamitra". Another inscription reads: "The gift of Kurangi, the mother of living sons and the wife of King Indragnimitra, son of Kosiki. The gift also of Srima of the royal palace shrine."

Patanjali, a famous grammarian stated in his Mahabhashya, that Brahmins and Śramaṇa, which included Buddhists, were eternal enemies.

With the emergence of Hindu rulers of the Gupta Empire, Hinduism saw a major revivalism in the Indian subcontinent which challenged Buddhism which was at that time at its zenith. Even though the Gupta Empire was tolerant towards Buddhism and patronized Buddhist arts and religious institutions, Hindu revivalism generally became a major threat to Buddhism which led to its decline.

A Buddhist illustrated palm leaf manuscript from the Pala period (one of the earliest Indian illustrated manuscripts to survive in modern times) is preserved in the University of Cambridge library. Composed in the year 1015, the manuscript contains a note from the year 1138 by a Buddhist believer called Karunavajra which indicates that without his efforts, the manuscript would have been destroyed during a political struggle for power. The note states that 'he rescued the Perfection of Wisdom, incomparable Mother of the Omniscient' from falling into the hands of unbelievers (who according to Camillo Formigatti were most probably people of Brahmanical affiliation).

The existence of religious violence between Hinduism and Buddhism in ancient India has been highly disputed. The fictional tales of Divyavadana are considered by scholars as being of doubtful value as a historical record. Moriz Winternitz, for example, stated, "these legends [in the Divyāvadāna] scarcely contain anything of much historical value". Similarly, Paul Williams states that the persecution claims with alleged dates of Buddha's nirvana (400 BCE) and the subsequent Pusyamitra reign, as depicted in the Mahasanghika school of early Buddhism are the "most far fetched of all the arguments and hardly worth of any further discussion".

=== In Bangladesh ===
The Hindu and Buddhist communities between 6th to 12th centuries living in eastern India had engaged in intense conflicts. Buddhist monasteries and Viharas had been converted into Hindu temples. In 2015, an archeological team by Jahangirnagar University discovered Hindu temples on 13 demolished stupas in Dinajpur. The construction may date back to between 8th to the 11th century, during Pala period. The excavation found the temples after digging 3,600 square feet at ‘Itakura Dhibi’ at Setabganj’s Ranagaon Union. Professor Swadhin Sen states the conversation of Buddhist religious structures to Hindu temples. Evidences suggests Gokul Medh's conversion to Hindu site. The Siddheshwar Shiva temple at West Bengal’s Bakurar Bahulraris is also noted to be built on a Votive Stupa.

== Persecution under other Kingdoms ==
=== Emperor Wuzong of Tang ===
Emperor Wuzong of Tang (814–846) indulged in indiscriminate religious persecution, solving a financial crisis by seizing the property of Buddhist monasteries. Buddhism had developed into a major religious force in Tang empire during the Tang period, and its monasteries had tax-exempt status. Wuzong closed many Buddhist shrines, confiscated their property, and sent the monks and nuns home to lay life. Apart from economic reasons, Wuzong's motivation was also philosophical or ideological. As a zealous Taoist, he considered Buddhism a foreign religion that was harmful to Chinese society. He went after other foreign religions as well, all but eradicating Zoroastrianism and Manichaeism in China, and his persecution of the growing Nestorian Christian churches sent Chinese Christianity into a decline from which it never recovered.

=== King Langdarma of Tibet ===
Langdarma was a Tibetan King, who reigned from 838 to 841 CE. He is believed to have been anti-Buddhist and a follower of the Bön religion.

=== Oirat Mongols ===
The Oirats (Western Mongols) converted to Tibetan Buddhism around 1615. The Dzungars were a confederation of several Oirat tribes that emerged suddenly in the early 17th century. The Dzungar Khanate was the last great nomadic empire in Asia. In the 18th century, the Dzungars were annihilated by Qianlong Emperor in several campaigns. About 80% of the Dzungar population, or around 500,000 to 800,000 people, were killed during or after the Zunghar Genocide by Manchu Bannermen and Khalkha Mongols during the Manchu conquest in 1755–1757.

The Kalmyk Khanate was founded in the 17th century with Tibetan Buddhism as its main religion, following the earlier migration of the Oirats from Dzungaria through Central Asia to the steppe around the mouth of the Volga River. During the course of the 18th century, they were absorbed by the Russian Empire, which was then expanding to the south and east. The Russian Orthodox church pressured many Kalmyks to adopt Orthodoxy. In the winter of 1770–1771, about 300,000 Kalmyks set out to return to China. Their goal was to retake control of Dzungaria from the Qing dynasty of China. Along the way many were attacked and killed by Kazakhs and Kyrgyz, their historical enemies based on intertribal competition for land, and many more died of starvation and disease. After several months of travel, only one-third of the original group reached Dzungaria and had no choice but to surrender to the Qing upon arrival.

== Persecution by Muslim Empires ==
=== Arab invasions ===
Qutaybah ibn Muslim, the Arab general of Khorasan conquered a number of territories in Central Asia including Samarkand where he broke a number of images. Several instances of Buddhist shrines being destroyed by the advancing Muslims are recorded though the religion continued to survive in some places for a considerable period of time. Bertolf Spuler cites the writings of Narshakhi while stating that the residents of Bukhara had reconverted from Islam to Buddhism four times until it was conquered by Qutayba in 712–13. A mosque was built in the city in place of a Buddhist monastery. Buddhists continued to live there until the tenth century. Similarly, Buddhism continued to exist in other places like Old Bukhara, Simingan in southern Tukharistan, Bamiyan and Kabul with suburbs inhabited by "Indians" which were also home to Buddhists. However, the religion could no longer develop as a power or distribute propaganda and its adherents also had to abandon the conversion of peoples in these regions. Scholars like Richard Nelson Frye have doubted the story of Marshaki, pointing out that unlike its statement, Qutayba ibn Muslim did not live during the time of Umayyad Caliph Mu'awiya, as this story suggests, but rather much later. In addition to discrimination, emigration, and the conversion of the laity, Buddhism and its monasteries also declined with the Muslims taking over the trade along the Silk Road as well as in Sindh.

During their conquest of Sindh, the Arabs brought the non-Muslims into the category of ahl al-kitab, considering them ahl al-dhimmah (protected subjects) and thus practicing a certain amount of non-interference in their religious lives under the condition that they fulfil a number of obligations that came with this status. Since both Buddhism and Hinduism are literate religions with scriptures, the precedent of assimilating Zoroastrians into the category of ahl al-kitab was extended to them as well. The dhimmis were obligated to pay the jizya for following their ancestral religion. The historian Al-Baladhuri notes a decision by Muhammad bin Qasim in relation to a Buddhist vihara and Aror that after conquering the city through a treaty (sulh) he agreed not to kill the people and enter their temple, in addition to imposing kharaj on them. The Buddhists had petitioned the Arabs for the right to restore one of their temples and it was granted by Al-Hajjaj ibn Yusuf. However, this decision was later violated by the Pact of Umar and subsequent Muslim law codes which prohibited the restoration of existing non-Muslim religious structures as well as the building of new ones. Despite this fact, Buddhist inscriptions were still being recorded in the eleventh century. Some Buddhists also fled and emigrated from Muslim-ruled areas into other regions. Unlike Brahmanical worship, Buddhism rapidly declined in Sindh after the eighth century and it virtually disappeared by the eleventh century.

The Arabs conquered Balkh which was a centre of Buddhism. Many people in Balkh were sympathetic to Buddhism after the conquest and they were harshly denounced by adherents of Islamic orthodoxy. The Buddhist monastery of Nava Vihara which had become a symbol of national resistance was damaged under Muawiyah I in 663. The Arabs allowed the non-Muslims to practice their religion as long as they paid the poll-tax called jizya. In addition to the destruction of Buddhist temples, part of the old city was also destroyed during the Arab conquest. Nava Vihara continued to remain open according to historical accounts. Along with it, many other viharas evidently continued to function in Central Asia for at least a century after the Arab conquests. Al-Biruni records the existence of the religion and its monasteries in the early eleventh century. The eighth-century Korean traveller Hui'Chao records Hinayanists in Balkh under Arab rule. The city was reduced to ruins by 705 as a result of frequent revolts.

It is visible from some copper-plate inscriptions that some Buddhists had moved to other domains. Al-Ma'mun (r. 813-833 A.D.) while visiting Khorasan, launched an attack on Kabul, whose ruler submitted to taxation. The king of Kabul was captured and he then converted to Islam. Per sources, when the Shah submitted to al-Ma'mun, he sent his crown and bejeweled throne, later seen by the Meccan historian al-Azraqi to the Caliph who praised Fadl for "curbing polytheists, breaking idols, killing the refractory" and refers to his successes against Kabul's king and ispahabad. Other near-contemporary sources however refer to the artifacts as a golden jewel-encrusted idol sitting on a silver throne by the Hindu Shahi ruler or by an unnamed ruler of "Tibet" as a sign of his conversion to Islam.

=== India ===
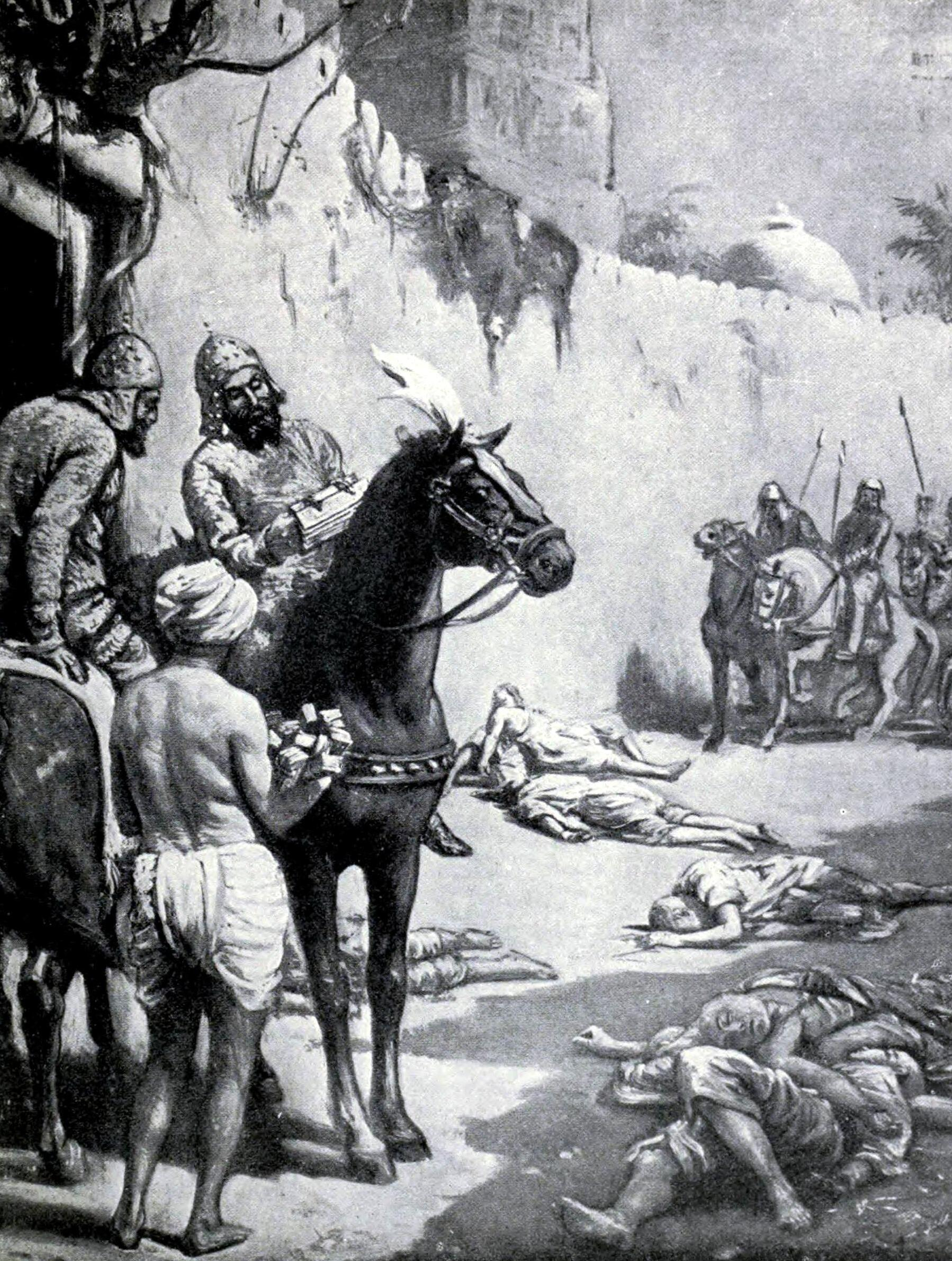
The image, in the chapter on India in Hutchison's Story of the Nations edited by James Meston, depicts the Muslim Turkic general Muhammad Bakhtiyar Khilji's massacre of Buddhist monks in Bihar. Khaliji destroyed the Nalanda and Vikramshila universities during his raids across North Indian plains, massacring many Buddhist and Brahmin scholars.

According to Lars Fogelin, the Decline of Buddhism in the Indian subcontinent is "not a singular event, with a singular cause; it was a centuries-long process."

Various personages involved in the revival of Buddhism in India such as Anagarika Dharmapala and The Mahabodhi Movement of the 1890s as well as Dr. B. R. Ambedkar hold the Muslim Rule and Brahmanism in India responsible for the decay of Buddhism in India.

In 1193, Qutb-ud-din Aybak, the founder of the Delhi Sultanate and first Muslim ruler in India, left defenseless the northeastern territories that were the heart of Buddhist India. The Mahabodhi Temple was almost completely destroyed by the invading Muslim forces.

One of Qutb-ud-Din's generals, Ikhtiar Uddin Muhammad Bin Bakhtiyar Khilji, who later becomes the first Muslim ruler of Bengal and Bihar, invaded Magadha and destroyed the Buddhist shrines and institutions at Nalanda, Vikramasila and Odantapuri, which declined the practice of Buddhism in East India. Many monuments of ancient Indian civilization were destroyed by the invading armies, including Buddhist sanctuaries near Benares. Buddhist monks who escaped the massacre fled to Nepal, Tibet and South India.

Tamerlane destroyed Buddhist establishments and raided areas in which Buddhism had flourished.

Mughal rule also contributed to the decline of Buddhism. They are reported to have destroyed many Hindu temples and Buddhist shrines alike or converted many sacred Hindu places into Muslim shrines and mosques. Mughal rulers like Aurangzeb destroyed Buddhist temples and monasteries and replaced them with mosques.

=== Others ===
The Saffarids had sent looted Buddhist and Hindu icons to the Abbasids as gifts. The Mongol ruler Ghazan called on Buddhists to convert to Islam or leave the Ilkhanate and ordered their temples to be destroyed, but he later adopted a slightly less severe position. Though he had earlier supported their persecution as well as the persecution of other non-Muslims, his religious policies changed after the death of Nowruz with punishments imposed on perpetrators of religious intolerance and attempts to restore relations with non-Muslims. Although the religion survived there, it never recovered from the assault by Ghazan.

=== Xinjiang ===
The historical area of what is modern day Xinjiang consisted of the distinct areas of the Tarim Basin and Dzungaria, and it was originally populated by Indo-European Tocharian and Iranic Saka peoples who practiced the Buddhist religion. The area was subjected to Turkification and Islamification at the hands of invading Turkic Muslims.

==== Conquest of Buddhist Khotan ====
The Islamic attacks and conquest of the Buddhist cities east of Kashgar was started by the Turkic Karakhanid Satok Bughra Khan who in 966 converted to Islam and many tales emerged about the Karakhanid ruling family's war against the Buddhists, Satok Bughra Khan's nephew or grandson Ali Arslan was slain by the Buddhists during the war. Buddhism lost territory to Islam during the Karakhanid reign around the Kashgar area. A long war ensued between Islamic Kashgar and Buddhist Khotan which eventually ended in the conquest of Khotan by Kashgar.

Iranic Saka peoples originally inhabited Yarkand and Kashgar in ancient times. The Buddhist Iranic Saka Kingdom of Khotan was the only city-state that was not conquered yet by the Turkic Uyghur (Buddhist) and the Turkic Qarakhanid (Muslim) states and its ruling family used Indian names and the population were devout Buddhists. The Buddhist entitites of Dunhuang and Khotan had a tight-knit partnership, with intermarriage between Dunhuang and Khotan's rulers and Dunhuang's Mogao grottos and Buddhist temples being funded and sponsored by the Khotan royals, whose likenesses were drawn in the Mogao grottoes. The rulers of Khotan were aware of the menace they faced since they arranged for the Mogao grottoes to paint a growing number of divine figures along with themselves. Halfway in the 10th century Khotan came under attack by the Qarakhanid ruler Musa, and in what proved to be a pivotal moment in the Turkification and Islamification of the Tarim Basin, the Karakhanid leader Yusuf Qadir Khan conquered Khotan around 1006.

The Taẕkirah is a genre of literature written about Sufi Muslim saints in Altishahr. Written sometime in the period from 1700 to 1849, the Eastern Turkic language (modern Uyghur) Taẕkirah of the Four Sacrificed Imams provides an account of the Muslim Karakhanid war against the Khotanese Buddhists, containing a story about Imams, from Mada'in city (possibly in modern-day Iraq) came four Imams who traveled to help the Islamic conquest of Khotan, Yarkand, and Kashgar by Yusuf Qadir Khan, the Qarakhanid leader. Accounts of the battles waged by the invading Muslims upon the indigenous Buddhists takes up most of the Taẕkirah with descriptions such as "blood flows like the Oxus", "heads litter the battlefield like stones" being used to describe the murderous battles over the years until the "infidels" were defeated and driven towards Khotan by Yusuf Qadir Khan and the four Imams, but the Imams were assassinated by the Buddhists prior to the last Muslim victory so Yusuf Qadir Khan assigned Khizr Baba, who was born in Khotan but whose mother originated from western Turkestan's Mawarannahr, to take care of the shrine of the four Imams at their tomb and after Yusuf Qadir Khan's conquest of new land in Altishahr towards the east, he adopted the title "King of the East and China". Due to the Imams deaths in battle and burial in Khotan, Altishahr, despite their foreign origins, they are viewed as local saints by the current Muslim population in the region.

Muslim works such as Ḥudūd al-ʿĀlam contained anti-Buddhist rhetoric and polemic against Buddhist Khotan, aimed at "dehumanizing" the Khotanese Buddhists, and the Muslims Kara-Khanids conquered Khotan just 26 years following the completion of Ḥudūd al-ʿĀlam.

Muslims gouged the eyes of Buddhist murals along Silk Road caves and Kashgari recorded in his Turkic dictionary an anti-Buddhist poem/folk song.

The Karakhanid leader Satuq Bughra Khan and his son proselytized Islam among the Turks and ordered the destruction of Buddhist temples. The Islamic conquest of Khotan led to alarm in the east. Dunhuang's Cave 17, which contained Khotanese literary works, may have been sealed, possibly after its caretakers heard that Khotan's Buddhist buildings were razed by the Muslims, and Khotan had suddenly ceased to be Buddhist.

In 1006, the Muslim Kara-Khanid ruler Yusuf Kadir (Qadir) Khan of Kashgar conquered Khotan, ending Khotan's existence as an independent state. The war was described as a Muslim Jihad (holy war) by the Japanese Professor Takao Moriyasu. The Karakhanid Turkic Muslim writer Mahmud al-Kashgari wrote a poem on the conquest:

We came down on them like a flood,
We went out among their cities,
We tore down the idol-temples,
We shat on the Buddha's head!
(Note: Uyghur: kälginläyü aqtïmïz; kändlär üzä čïqtïmïz; furxan ävin yïqtïmïz; burxan üzä sïčtïmïz)

Idols of "infidels" were subjected to desecration by being defecated upon by Muslims when the "infidel" country was conquered by the Muslims, according to Muslim tradition.

==== Islamic conquest of the Buddhist Uighurs ====
The Buddhist Uyghurs of the Kingdom of Qocho and Turfan were converted to Islam by conquest during a ghazat (holy war) at the hands of the Muslim Chagatai Khizr Khwaja.

Kara Del was a Mongolian who ruled an Uighur-populated Buddhist Kingdom. The Muslim Chagatai Khan Mansur invaded and used the sword to make the population convert to Islam.

After being converted to Islam, the descendants of the previously Buddhist Uyghurs in Turfan failed to retain memory of their ancestral legacy and falsely believed that the "infidel Kalmuks" (Dzungars) were the ones who built Buddhist monuments in their area.

== Persecution by militaristic regimes ==
=== Imperial Japan ===
The Meiji reformers sought to suppress Buddhism and its social network of temple parishes, replacing people's religious allegiance to local Buddhist groups with integration into the hierarchical state religion of Shinto. Some Buddhist monks were forced to return to the laity, Buddhist property was confiscated, Buddhist institutions were closed, and Buddhist schools were reorganized under state control in order to separate Shinto from Buddhism. However, this persecution was short lived. The state-control of Buddhism was part of Imperial Japanese policy both at home and abroad in Korea and other conquered territories.

=== South Korea ===
On October 27, 1980, the Chun Doo-hwan government arrested and investigated 153 people related to the Jogye Order to "purify the Buddhist community". The real motive is thought to be that the headquarter of the Jogye Order had visited Gwangju to support the victims of the Gwangju Uprising. The incident is considered an abuse of state power under martial law and violation of religious freedom.

=== Persecution in Burma ===
The Burmese military government has attempted to control Buddhist institutions through coercive means, including the intimidation, torture, and murder of monks. After monks played an active role in the protest movements against the then-ruling socialist military dictatorship and later the then-ruling military dictatorship in 1988 during the Fall of Socialism and 2007, the state cracked down on Buddhist monks and monasteries.

== Persecution by nationalist political parties ==
=== Persecution in the Republic of China under the Kuomintang ===
During the Northern Expedition, in 1926 in Guangxi, Kuomintang Muslim General Bai Chongxi led his troops in destroying Buddhist temples and smashing statues, forcefully turning the temples into schools and Kuomintang party headquarters. It was reported that almost all Buddhist monasteries in Guangxi were destroyed by Bai in this manner. The monks were removed. Bai led a wave of anti-foreignism in Guangxi, attacking Americans, Europeans, and other foreigners and missionaries, and generally making the province unsafe for foreigners. Westerners fled from the province, and some Chinese Christians were also attacked as imperialist agents. The three goals of his movement were anti-foreignism, anti-imperialism, and anti-religion. Bai led the anti-religious movement, against superstition. Muslims have hostile attitude toward idol-worship and his personal faith may have influenced Bai to take action against the statues of deities in the temples and the superstitious practices rampant in China. Huang Shaoxiong, also a Kuomintang member of the New Guangxi Clique, supported Bai's campaign, and Huang was not a Muslim; the anti-religious campaign was agreed upon by all Guangxi Kuomintang members.

During the Kuomintang Pacification of Qinghai the Muslim General Ma Bufang destroyed Tibetan Buddhist monasteries with support from the Kuomintang government. Ma served as a general in the National Revolutionary Army, and sought to expand the Republic of China's control over all of Qinghai, as well as the possibility of bringing Tibet back into the Republic by force. When Ma Bufang launched seven expeditions into Golog, killing thousands of Tibetans, the Republic of China government, known as the Kuomintang, supported Ma Bufang. Ma was highly anti-communist, and he and his army wiped out many Tibetans in the northeast and eastern Qinghai, and destroyed Tibetan Buddhist temples.

== Persecution by Muslims ==
=== Afghanistan ===
The Muslim Mughal emperor, Aurangzeb, tried to use heavy artillery to destroy the Buddha statues but failed. Another failed attempt to destroy the Bamiyan statues was made by the 18th-century Persian king Nader Afshar, who directed cannon fire at them.

The enormous statues, the male Salsal ("light shines through the universe") and the (smaller) female Shamama ("Queen Mother"), as they were called by the ignorant locals, did not fail to fire the imagination of Islamic writers in centuries past. The larger statue reappears as the malevolent giant Salsal in medieval Turkish tales.

Afghan Muslim King Abdur Rahman Khan destroyed its face during a military campaign against the Shia Hazara rebellion. An explorer named Alexander Burnes made a sensationalized drawing of the statues in the 1830s.

The Bamiyan Buddhas were eventually destroyed by the fundamentalist Islamist Taliban regime in 2001 after not able to get monetary funding, in defiance of worldwide condemnation. The statues were blown up and fired upon by rockets and gunfire.

Excavators at the Buddhist site of Mes Aynak have been denounced as "promoting Buddhism" and threatened by the Taliban and many of the Afghan excavators who are working for purely financial reasons do not feel any connection to the Buddhist artifacts.

=== Pakistan ===
Swat Valley in Pakistan has many Buddhist carvings, stupas and Jehanabad contains a Seated Buddha statue. Kushan era Buddhist stupas and statues in the Swat valley were demolished by the Taliban and after two attempts by the Taliban, the Jehanabad Buddha's face was dynamited. Only the Bamiyan Buddhas were larger than the carved giant Buddha statues in Swat near Manglawar which the Taliban attacked. The government did nothing to safeguard the statue after the initial attempt at destroying the Buddha, which did not cause permanent harm, and when the second attack took place on the statue, the feet, shoulders, and face were demolished. Islamists such as the Taliban and looters destroyed much of Pakistan's Buddhist artifacts left over from the Buddhist Gandhara civilization, especially in the Swat Valley. The Taliban deliberately targeted Gandhara Buddhist relics for destruction. The Christian Archbishop of Lahore Lawrence John Saldanha wrote a letter to Pakistan's government denouncing the Taliban activities in the Swat Valley, including their destruction of Buddha statues and their attacks on Christians, Sikhs, and Hindus. Gandhara Buddhist artifacts were illegally looted by smugglers. A rehabilitation attempt on the Buddha was made by Luca Olivieri from Italy. A group of Italians helped repair the Buddha.

=== Bangladesh ===
In Bangladesh, the persecution of the indigenous tribes of the Chittagong Hill Tracts such as the Chakma, Marma, Tripura and others who are mainly Buddhists, Hindus, Christians, and Animists, has been described as genocidal. The Chittagong Hill Tracts are located bordering India, Myanmar and the Bay of Bengal, and is the home to 500,000 indigenous people. The perpetrators of are the Bangladeshi military and the Bengali Muslim settlers, who together have burned down Buddhist and Hindu temples, killed many Chakmas, and carried out a policy of gang-rape against the indigenous people. There are also accusations of Chakmas being forced to convert to Islam, many of them children who have been abducted for this purpose. The conflict started soon after Bangladeshi independence in 1972 when the Constitution imposed Bengali as the sole official language – with no cultural or linguistic rights to minority populations. Subsequently, the government encouraged and sponsored massive settlement by Bangladeshis in region, which changed the demographics from 98 percent indigenous in 1971 to fifty percent by 2000. The government allocated a full third of the Bangladeshi military to the region to support the settlers, sparking a protracted guerilla war between Hill tribes and the military. During this conflict which officially ended in 1997, and in the subsequent period, a large number of human rights violations against the indigenous peoples have been reported, with violence against indigenous women being particularly extreme. Bengali settlers and soldiers have raped native Jumma (Chakma) women "with impunity" with the Bangladeshi security forces doing little to protect the Jummas and instead assisting the rapists and settlers. The Karuna Bihar Buddhist temple was attacked by Bengali settlers.

Chittagong Hill Tracts had 98.5% Buddhist and Hindu population in 1947 during the partition of India. The British gave the Buddhist dominated land to East Pakistan against the principles of partition and against wishes of indigenous people. Chittagong Hill Tracts is the traditional home of the Chakma, Marma, Tripura, Mro, Khumi and other indigenous tribes who mainly practice Buddhism. Successive Pakistan and Bangladeshi governments had been encouraging Muslim migration into the Chittagong Hill Tracts to dilute the indigenous Buddhist population. Indigenous Buddhist people of Chittagong Hill Tracts resisted the colonization of their land by demographic engineering. In response Bangladesh government sent tens of thousands of military personnel to the Chittagong Hill Tracts to protect the Muslim settlers and fight the indigenous resistance movement named Shanti Bahini.

Bangladesh Army in league with the Muslim settlers committed 13 major massacres in the span of 15 years between 1980 and 1995 slaughtering hundreds of indigenous Buddhist people in each massacre. They committed numerous other massacres killing 10 to 20 people since birth of Bangladesh in 1971. Apart from mass killing Bangladesh and Muslim settlers are involved in extrajudicial execution of the indigenous people. Indigenous people are victims of arbitrary arrest and detention. Bangladesh Army and Muslim settlers often subject them to severe torture and beating. Indigenous Buddhist women and even minor girls are vulnerable to rape by Muslim settlers and Bangladesh army. Bangladesh army and Muslim settlers had raped thousands of indigenous Buddhist women and girls. Indigenous Buddhist people are subjected to systematic proselytization by the Bangladesh government and many Saudi funded Islamic missionary organizations. Bangladesh army also resort to forcible conversion. Bangladesh Army and Muslim settlers destroyed and desecrated hundreds of Buddhist temples in Chittagong Hill Tracts.

==== Massacres ====
Between 1980 and 1995, Bangladesh Army and Muslim settlers committed at least 13 major massacres against the indigenous Buddhist people in the Chittagong Hill Tracts. No military personnel or settler was ever tried for these massacres. The massacres are usually carried out to evict indigenous people from their villages or in retaliation to Shanti Bahini attacks.

Kaukhali Massacre 25 March 1980

The commander of the Bangladesh army at Kaukhali ordered the indigenous Buddhist people to gather at Kaukhali Bazar in the morning of 25 March 1980 to discuss the repair of the Poapara Buddhist Vihara. On 25 March 1980, when indigenous Buddhist people gathered at Kaukhali Bazar, Bangladesh Army and Muslim settlers suddenly attacked and massacred an estimated 300 Chakma and Marma Buddhists at Kaukhali in Rangamati district.

Barkal Massacre 31 May 1984

Bangladesh Army and Muslim settlers attacked several Buddhist villages of Bhusanchara, Bhusanbagh, Het Baria, Suguri Para, Goranstan, Tarengya Ghat in Barkal and massacred more than 400 Chakma Buddhists. Amnesty International collected 67 names killed in the massacre.

Panchari Massacre 1–2 May 1986

Bangladesh Army and Muslim settlers attacked indigenous Buddhist villages of Golakpatimachara, Kalanal, Soto Karmapara, Shantipur, Mirjibil, Hetarachara, Pujgang, Logang, Hathimuktipara, Sarveshwarpara, Napidpara and Dewan Bazar. Bangladesh Army and Muslim settlers randomly opened fire on indigenous people massacred hundreds of Chakma Buddhists. Amnesty International collected more than 50 names killed in the massacre.

Matiranga Massacre 1–7 May 1986

Between 1 and 7 May 1986, widespread military operation and persecution forced a group of Tripuri people to take refuge in the jungle between Sarveswarpara and Manudaspara in Matiranga. While they were trying to reach India, Bangladesh Army detected and ambushed them. Bangladesh army massacred at least 60 indigenous Tripuri people.

Matiranga Massacre 18–19 May 1986

To escape systematic persecution, a large group of indigenous Tripuri people were trying to reach India by following jungle trails. However Bangladesh army discovered and surrounded them. Bangladesh army took them to a narrow valley between Comillatila and Taidong in Matiranga. Bangladesh army suddenly opened fire in the restricted space and killed at least 200 indigenous Tripuri people.

Baghaichari Massacre 3–10 August 1988

Bangladesh Army and Muslim settlers launched a week long campaign of terror in retaliation for Shanti Bahini attacks on Bangladeshi armed forces and Muslim settlements. Bangladesh Army and Muslim settlers attacked Durchari, Khedamara, Battuli, Sarwatuli villages in Baghaichari and murdered more than 500 indigenous Chakma Buddhists.

Langadu Massacre 4 May 1989

Un-identified gunmen murdered a Muslim community leader Abdur Rashid of Langadu. Bangladesh military and civil administration suspected Buddhist resistance movement Shanti Bahini murdered the Muslim leader. Bangladesh Army agitated the Muslim settlers. Muslim settlers attacked the indigenous Buddhist people of Langadu with the encouragement of the Bangladesh military ad civil authorities. More than 50 indigenous Buddhist people were massacred with swords and lances.

Malya Massacre 2 Feb 1992

A commuter ferry loaded with people was sailing from Marishya to Rangamati. A bomb exploded at Malya in Langadu Upazila. According to eyewitnesses, two Bangladesh military personnel planted the bomb. Bangladesh government had settled many Muslim settlers at Malya by displacing indigenous Buddhist people. The survivors of the explosion swam to the shore. But Muslim settlers were waiting for them with weapons and attacked them when reached the shore. More than 30 indigenous Buddhist people were massacred.

Logang Massacre 10 April 1992

2 Muslim settlers armed with swords attempted to rape indigenous Buddhist girls who were grazing cows at Logang in Panchari. An indigenous man defended the girls and was killed in the brawl. The Muslim settler ran to the Bangladesh Army camp and spread the rumor that indigenous people attacked them. In reprisal Bangladesh Army and Muslim settlers attacked indigenous people at Logang and massacred more than 500 indigenous people.

Naniachar Massacre 17 November 1993

Indigenous Buddhist people demanded the Bangladesh Army check post at Naniachar in Rangamati be removed. Bangladesh Army often harassed indigenous Buddhist people from the check post at Naniachar Ferry Stoppage. Indigenous Buddhist people gathered at Naniachar Bazar to protest harassment. Muslim settlers with the direct help from the Bangladesh Army attacked the peaceful demonstration of the indigenous people and murdered at least 66 indigenous people.

==== Unlawful killing ====
Besides mass killing, indigenous Buddhist people are also killed in small numbers by Bangladesh Army and Muslim settlers. Most common form of killing occurs when indigenous people are detained and beaten in numerous Bangladeshi military, intelligence and police installations in the CHT. Killings also occur when Bangladesh Army randomly open fire at villagers. Bangladesh Government provides weapons to Muslim settlers and they are also responsible for killing of indigenous people. The Muslim settlers often join the armed forces in raid of indigenous villages and involved in killing indigenous people by firearms or crude sharp weapons. The settlers also take part in communal riots instigated by the Bangladesh Army and kill indigenous Buddhist people.

==== Detention and torture ====
Indigenous people are detained without warrant and often tortured in the custody of Bangladeshi armed forces. Bangladeshi armed forces detain and torture indigenous Buddhist people on mere suspicion of being members of the Shanti Bahini or helping the Shanti Bahini. There were numerous check posts on highways and ferries in the Chittagong Hill Tracts. Bangladeshi armed forces interrogate and detain indigenous travelers from these check posts. Bangladeshi armed forces raid indigenous Buddhist villages and torture indigenous people on suspicion of sheltering and feeding the Shanti Bahini.

Indigenous people who are detained in military camps and cantonments are subjected to severe beating, electrocution, water boarding, hanging upside down, shoving burning cigarettes on bodies etc. Prisoners are detained in pits and trenches. Bangladeshi soldiers sprinkle hot water on indigenous prisoners. Indigenous captives are then taken out for interrogation one at a time. Indigenous people are often tortured during interrogation.

==== Rape and abduction ====
Bangladesh Government tacitly encourages Bangladesh Army and Muslim settlers to rape indigenous girls and women as tool to expel them from their traditional land. As a result, thousands of indigenous girls and women were raped by the armed forces and settlers since independence of Bangladesh in 1971.

==== Land Grab ====
Since vast majority of the indigenous people are farmers and cultivators, land is very important and only means of survival. The government's sponsored settlement in the CHT dispossessed many indigenous people of their lands.

During the 2012 Ramu violence a 25,000-strong mob set fire to at least five temples and dozens of homes throughout the town and surrounding villages after seeing a picture of an allegedly desecrated Quran, which they claimed had been posted on Facebook by Uttam Barua, a local Buddhist man.

=== India ===
The Ladakh Buddhist Association has said: "There is a deliberate and organised design to convert Kargil's Buddhists to Islam. In the last four years, about 50 girls and married women with children were taken and converted from village Wakha alone. If this continues unchecked, we fear that Buddhists will be wiped out from Kargil in the next two decades or so. Anyone objecting to such allurement and conversions is harassed."

The Mahabodhi Temple, a UNESCO World Heritage Site, is one of the most sacred Buddhist temple in Bodh Gaya, marking the location where Gautama Buddha is said to have attained Enlightenment. On 7 July 2013, a series of ten bombs exploded in and around the Mahabodhi Temple complex. Five people, including two Buddhist monks, were injured by the blasts. Three other devices were defused by bomb-disposal squads at a number of locations in Gaya. On 4 November 2013, the National Investigation Agency announced that the Islamic terrorist group Indian Mujahideen was responsible for the bombings.

=== Maldives ===
The destruction of the Buddhist artifacts by Islamists took place on the day in which Mohamed Nasheed was toppled as president in a coup. Buddhist antiquities were obliterated by Islamist radicals in the National Museum. The Museum was stormed by Islamists who destroyed the Buddhist artifacts. The non Muslim artifacts of Buddhist provenance were specifically singled out by the attackers. The destruction was caught on camera. Most of Maldive's Buddhist physical history was obliterated. Hindu artifacts were also targeted for obliteration and the actions have been compared to the attacks on the Buddhas of Bamiyan by the Taliban. 7 February 2012 was the date of the anti-Buddhist attack by the Islamists.

=== Myanmar ===
The violence and long lasting tension was reignited on 28 May 2012. It was reported that the 27 years old daughter of U Hla Tin, of Thabyechaung village named Ma Thida Htwe was violently raped and murdered by three Muslims. These men were later arrested.

Tensions between Buddhist and Muslim ethnic groups flared into violent clashes in Meiktila, Mandalay Division in 2013. The violence started on 20 March after a Muslim gold shop owner, his wife, and two Muslim employees assaulted a Buddhist customer and her husband in an argument over a gold hairpin. A large Buddhist mob formed and began to destroy the shop. The heavily outnumbered police reportedly told the mob to disperse after they had destroyed the shop.

On the same day, a local Buddhist monk on a motorbike was attacked by four Muslims. According to witnesses, the driver was attacked with a sword, causing him to crash, while the monk was also hit in the head with the sword. Per a witness, one of the men doused the monk with fuel and burnt him alive. The monk died in the hospital. The killing of the monk caused the relatively contained situation to explode, greatly increasing in intensity and violence.

=== Thailand ===
Primarily Thai central government has been involved in a civil war with Muslim insurgents in Thailand's three southernmost Muslim-majority provinces of Yala, Narathiwat and Pattani. There are quite a number of cases of Buddhist civilians in these regions that have been beheaded by Muslim insurgents, Buddhist monks and Buddhist school teachers are frequently threatened with death and murdered. Shootings of Buddhists are quite frequent in the South, as are bombings, and attacks on Buddhist temples.

=== Xinjiang ===
During the Kumul Rebellion in Xinjiang in the 1930s, Buddhist murals were deliberately vandalized by Muslims.

Buddhist murals at the Bezeklik Thousand Buddha Caves were damaged by local Muslim population whose religion proscribed figurative images of sentient beings, the eyes and mouths in particular were often gouged out. Pieces of murals were also broken off for use as fertilizer by the locals.

Uyghur Muslim opposition to a Buddhist Aspara statue in Ürümqi in Xinjiang was cited as a possible reason for its destruction in 2012. A Muslim Kazakh viewed a giant Buddha statue near Ürümqi as "alien cultural symbols".

=== Indonesia ===
Nine bombs were detonated at the Borobudur Buddhist temple located in Central Java on 21 January 1985, causing nine stupas to be badly damaged. There were no human casualties in this attack. A Buddhist monastery in Jakarta was attacked by suspected local Islamic militants on 4 August 2013 at 6:53 p.m. Three people were injured in this attack.

In the village of Kebon Baru (Banten), an Islamic group forced a Buddhist monk, Mulyanto Nurhalim to sign an agreement to force him to abandon his home and wrongfully accused him of religious proselytism.

On 29 July 2016, several Buddhist vihara were plundered and burnt down by Muslim mobs in Tanjung Balai of North Sumatra. On 26 November 2016, a homemade bomb was discovered in front of Vihara Buddha Tirta, a Buddhist temple in Lhok Seumawe of Aceh.

== Persecution by Christians ==
=== India ===
The National Socialist Council of Nagaland has been accused of demanding money and food from Buddhists living along the Assam-Arunachal border. It has also been accused by Buddhists of forcing locals to convert to Christianity. The NSCN is also suspected of burning down the Rangphra temple in Arunachal Pradesh.

The National Liberation Front of Tripura has shut down and attacked Hindu and Buddhist orphanages, hospitals, temples and schools in Tripura. They have also been falsely accused of force converting Buddhists to Christianity.

A mass scale ethnic riot was initiated by the Baptist Church in Tripura in 1980 by which both Hindu and Buddhist tribes faced systematic ethnic cleansing. Thousands of women were kidnapped and then raped and even forced to convert to Christianity. Reports state that the terrorists received aid from international Christian groups. The Christian tribals also received aid from the NLFT. This was the state's worst ethnic riot.

=== Japan ===
In Sengoku period Japan, as several daimyo and their subjects converted to Christianity via the efforts of Jesuit missionaries, the destruction of Buddhist and Shinto temples and shrines would often accompany it, with some Jesuits encouraging the destruction and persecutions, and others (notably Francisco Cabral and Alessandro Valignano) condemning anti-Buddhist violence. Buddhist monks could face persecution by being forcefully evicted out of the temples which would then be reused as churches. Christian daimyo could also force Buddhist monks to marry. Some Christian converts believed that Shinto and Buddhist deities were evil spirits whose influence could be eliminated via the destruction of their religious sites.

Efforts to convert the Japanese populace from pluralistic religion and replace it with a different creed altogether were a phenomenon never experienced before in Japan, and the notion was seen as foreign. The destruction of religious sites by Christians even in peacetime and as a purely religious act was also seen as unparalleled by the Japanese authorities. A 1587 edict by Toyotomi Hideyoshi states that "Japan is the land of the Gods and so it is undesirable that evil doctrines from Christian lands be propagated. To approach the inhabitants of our lands, make them into followers and destroy shrines and temples is unprecedented behavior."

=== South Korea ===
There was also a series of Buddhist temple burnings in the 1980s and 1990s, and attacks on Buddhist artwork have continued. In one instance, a Protestant minister used a microphone on a cord as a bolo weapon and smashed temple paintings and a statue. In other instances, red crosses have been painted on temple walls, murals, and statues. Buddha statues have also been decapitated. Furthermore, students at Buddhist universities report aggressive attempts by Christians to convert them on campus, especially near campus temples.

Some South Korean Buddhists have denounced what they view as discriminatory measures against them and their religion by the administration of President Lee Myung-bak, which they attribute to Lee's membership in the Somang Presbyterian Church in Seoul. Of particular note was after Lee Myung-bak's ascendence to the Presidency when the high proportion of Christians in relation to Buddhists in the public sector became known–particularly the president's cabinet, where there were twelve Christians to only one Buddhist.

The Buddhist Jogye Order has accused the Lee government of discriminating against Buddhism and favoring Christianity by ignoring certain Buddhist temples but including Christian churches in certain public documents. In 2006, according to the Asia Times, "Lee also sent a video prayer message to a Christian rally held in the southern city of Busan in which the worship leader prayed feverishly: 'Lord, let the Buddhist temples in this country crumble down!'" Further, according to an article in Buddhist-Christian Studies: "Over the course of the last decade [1990s] a fairly large number of Buddhist temples in South Korea have been destroyed or damaged by fire by misguided Christian fundamentalists. More recently, Buddhist statues have been identified as idols, and attacked and decapitated in the name of Jesus. Arrests are hard to effect, as the arsonists and vandals work by stealth of night." A 2008 incident in which police investigated protesters who had been given sanctuary in the Jogye temple in Seoul and searched a car driven by Jigwan, executive chief of the Jogye order, led to protests by Buddhists who claimed that police had treated Jigwan as a criminal.

In March 2009, in an effort to reach out to Buddhists affected by recent events, the President and First Lady participated in a Korean Buddhist conference where he and his wife were seen joining palms in prayer during chanting along with participants. The discomfort among the Buddhists has gradually decreased since then.

=== Sri Lanka ===
In 1815, the British Army captured the Kingdom of Kandy and deposed the Sinhalese monarch, ending a line of Sinhalese Buddhist kings which lasted for over 2300 years. The British would rule over the island of Sri Lanka until 1948. Like the Dutch, the British refused to register unbaptized infants or accept non-Christian marriages. Christians were openly favored for jobs and promotions. The British also supported various Christian missionary groups to established Christian schools on the island. Education in these Christian schools (which disparaged Buddhism) was a requirement to serve in a government office. Missionaries also wrote tracts in Sinhalese attacking Buddhism and promoting Christianity. Robert Inglis, a 19th-century British Conservative, likened Buddhism to "idolatry" during a parliamentary debate in 1852 over the relationship of "Buddhist priests" to the British colonial government. In the 19th century, a national Buddhist revival movement began as a response to Christian proselytization and suppression, and was empowered by the results of a Panadura debate between Christian priests and Buddhist monks such as Migettuwatte Gunananda Thera and Hikkaduwe Sri Sumangala Thera, which was widely seen as a victory for the Buddhists.

=== United States ===
In February 1942, President Franklin D. Roosevelt signed into law Executive Order 9066. This gave the military discretion to do whatever it deemed necessary to secure the safety and security of the United States. The wartime incarceration, which the religion played in the evaluation of whether or not they could be considered fully American because the vast majority of them were Buddhists.

In 2020, Christian fundamentalists vandalized six Buddhist temples amid growing anti-Asian violence. The following year, a Buddhist temple in Los Angeles was burned and suffered other damages, including a broken glass door and a knocked down lantern.

=== Vietnam ===
As early as 1953, complaints surfaced alleging raids against Buddhists by French-armed Catholic militiamen in Vietnam. By 1961, the shelling of pagodas in Vietnam was being reported in the Australian and American media.

After the Catholic Ngô Đình Diệm came to power in South Vietnam, backed by the United States, he allegedly favoured his relatives and fellow Catholics over Buddhists and dedicated the country to the Virgin Mary in 1959. Buddhists also required special government permits to hold large meetings, a stipulation generally made for meetings of trade unions. In May 1963, the government forbade the flying of Buddhist flags on Vesak. After Buddhist protesters clashed with government troops, nine people were killed. In protest, the Buddhist monk Thích Quảng Đức burned himself to death in Saigon. On 21 August, the Xá Lợi Pagoda raids led to a death toll estimated in the hundreds.

Portrayals by Western media at the time were distorted. In reality, South Vietnam saw Buddhism flourish under Diệm's First Republic; a United Nations independent fact-finding team later found that the South Vietnamese government had not engaged in the systematic oppression of Buddhists. With the aim of harnessing religious nationalism and promoting spiritual values against communism's atheism, Diệm's Personalist Revolution amplified religious consciousness that ultimately challenged the state's authority.

== Persecution in Sri Lanka ==
=== Transitional period ===
Magha, the Hindu invader from Kalinga who seized power in Polonnaruwa in the 13th century CE with the help of his soldiers and mercenaries from the modern Kerala and Damila (Tamil Nadu) regions in India, in the Culavamsa was the spreading of false faith. The Pujavaliya composed in the aftermath of Magha's invasion declares that the unbelievers will never have permanent residence on the island reserved for Buddhism and that it is only suitable for Buddhist rulers. But Māgha's rule of 21 years and its aftermath are a watershed in the history of the island, creating a new political order.

A second poilitical center emerged in the north of the island where Tamil settlers from previous Indian incursions occupied the Jaffna Peninsula and the Vanni. (Note: The land between Anuradhapura and Jaffna) Many Tamil members of invading armies, mercenaries, joined them rather than returning to India with their compatriots. By the 13th century the Tamils too withdrew from the Vanni almost entirely into the Jaffna peninsula where an independent Tamil kingdom had been established. Māgha, a bigoted Hindu, persecuted Sinhalese Buddhists, despoiling the temples and giving away lands of the Sinhalese to his followers. His priorities in ruling were to extract as much as possible from the land and overturn as many of the traditions of Rajarata as possible. His reign saw the Killing of many Sinhalese by his army and massive migration of the Sinhalese people to the south and west of Sri Lanka, and into the mountainous interior, in a bid to escape his power. The increasing influence of Hinduism on the island starting from the 13th century CE was resisted by the Sangha who decried the worship of Hindu gods and ridiculed Hindu customs such as wearing the sacred ash. However, the Sinhalese kingdoms continued to decline, under the attacks by South Indian states. The last Sinhala king to rule from Polonnaruva was Parākramabāhu III (1302–1310), who was actually a client king of the Pandyas and later had to retreat to Dambadeniya. After this, Sinhala kings were forced to retreat further to the south (to cities like Kurunagala and Gampola), mainly in search of security from South Indian states and from the expansive Tamil kingdom of Jaffna (a Hindu realm which now controlled the north-west of the island).

=== Kandyan period ===
In the Sri Lankan Sinhalese society, king Rajasinha I of Sitawaka reverted to Saiva Siddhantism after a prolonged domination of Theravada Buddhism following the conversion of king Devanampiya Tissa.

King Rajasinha arranged the marriage of his Tamil minister Mannamperuma Mohottala to a sister of a junior queen known as the "iron daughter" He converted to Shaiva Siddhanta He was reported to have settled Brahmans Adi Shaivas and Tamil Shaivite Velalars at significant Buddhist sites such as Sri Pada, etc. The Velala Gurukkals acted as religious mentors of the King and strengthened Shaiva Siddhantism at these centres. Under the advice of Mannamperuma Mohottala, he razed many Buddhist religious sites to the ground. Buddhism remained in decline thereafter until the formation of the Siam Nikaya and Amarapura Nikaya with the support of the Portuguese and Dutch East India Company respectively.

=== Post-independence ===
During the 1958 riots, Tamil rioters attacked the Sri Naga Vihara in Jaffna and the Nagadeepa Purana Vihara, completely destroying the latter. Two decades later, several Sinhalese witnesses testified to the Sansoni commission that there had been damage done to ancient Buddhist monuments and buildings in the Trincomalee District in the early 1970s. Justice Miliani Sansoni opined that the damage to ancient Buddhist sites in the Northern and Eastern Provinces was a cause of the 1977 riots. During the riots, a Buddhist temple in Kilinochchi was burned by a Tamil mob as part of anti-Sinhalese rioting.

During the Sri Lankan civil war, there had been a number of attacks by the Liberation Tigers of Tamil Eelam and other Tamil militant groups at Buddhist sites such as the Dalada Maligawa, often involving the massacre of Sinhalese Buddhist civilians. Sociologist Sasanka Perera remarked that, while the militants sought to destroy Buddhist sites to erase signs of Sinhalese heritage in their claimed territories, they were actually destroying their own heritage.

== Persecution in Nepal ==
The banishment of Buddhist monks from Nepal was part of a Rana government campaign to suppress the resurgence of Theravada Buddhism in Nepal in the early decades of the 20th century. There were two deportations of monks from Kathmandu, in 1926 and 1944.

The exiled monks were the first group of monks to be seen in Nepal since the 14th century. They were at the forefront of a movement to revive Theravada Buddhism which had disappeared from the country more than five hundred years ago. The Rana regime disapproved of Buddhism and Nepal Bhasa, the mother tongue of the Newar people. It saw the activities of the monks and their growing following as a threat. When police harassment and imprisonment failed to deter the monks, all of whom were Newars, they were deported.

Among the charges made against them were preaching a new faith, converting Hindus, encouraging women to renounce and thereby undermining family life and writing books in Nepal Bhasa.

== Persecution under Communism ==
=== Cambodia under the Khmer Rouge ===
The Khmer Rouge, under its policy of state atheism, actively imposed an atheistic agrarian revolution, resulting in the persecution of ethnic minorities and Buddhist monks during their reign from 1975 to 1979. Buddhist institutions and temples were destroyed, and Buddhist monks and teachers were killed in large numbers. A third of the nation's monasteries were destroyed along with numerous holy texts and items of high artistic quality. 25,000 Buddhist monks were massacred by the regime. Pol Pot believed that Buddhism was a decadent affectation, and he sought to eliminate its 1,500-year-old mark on Cambodia, while still maintaining the structures of the traditional Buddhist base.

=== China ===
Since the Chinese Communist Revolution, Buddhism has been severely restricted and brought under state control at times. In addition, "Marxist–Leninist atheism has been widely publicized, resulting in steadily decreasing religious communities", especially in areas with developed economies. In 1989, less than 12% of the population held religious beliefs. During the Cultural Revolution, Chinese Buddhists were actively persecuted and sent for re-education, while Buddhist temples, statues, and sutras were vandalized and destroyed by the Red Guards for many years due to antireligious campaigns of the Chinese Communist Party. In recent years, Buddhism in China has been undergoing a revival, but most Buddhist institutions are within the confines of the state.

==== Tibet ====
Although many Buddhist temples and monasteries have been rebuilt after the Cultural Revolution, Tibetan Buddhists have largely been confined by the Government of the People's Republic of China. According to reports, Tibetan Buddhist monks and nuns have been incarcerated, tortured, and killed by the People's Liberation Army, according to all human rights organizations. There were over 6,000 Buddhist monasteries in Tibet, and nearly all of them were ransacked and destroyed by the Chinese communists, mainly during the Cultural Revolution. Witness statements document that many Tibetan Buddhist monasteries were destroyed by the Chinese communists before the Cultural Revolution. Moreover, the "Chinese Communist Party has launched a three-year drive to promote atheism in the Buddhist region of Tibet", with Xiao Huaiyuan, a leader in the Chinese Communist Party Propaganda Department in Tibet, stating that it would "help peasants and herdsmen free themselves from the negative influence of religion. Intensifying propaganda on atheism is especially important for Tibet because atheism plays an extremely important role in promoting economic construction, social advancement and socialist spiritual civilization in the region." He further said it would push "people of all ethnic groups in the region to raise their ideological and ethical quality, to learn a civilized and healthy life style and to strive to build a united, prosperous and civilized new Tibet."

=== Mongolia ===
Buddhist monks were persecuted in Mongolia during communist rule up until revolutionary democratization in 1990. Khorloogiin Choibalsan declared 17,000 of the monks to be enemies of the state and deported them to Siberian labor camps, where many perished. Almost all of Mongolia's over 700 Buddhist monasteries were looted or destroyed.

=== North Korea ===
The Oxford Handbook of Atheism states that "North Korea maintains a state-sanctioned and enforced atheism". During the 1960s and 1970s, "North Korea effectively exterminated all signs of Buddhism" in the country.

=== Soviet Union ===
Buddhism was persecuted and looked down upon by the Soviet authorities under the government policy of state atheism. Adherents were attacked by the authorities. In 1929, the government of the USSR closed many monasteries and arrested monks, sending them into exile. As government efforts brought Sovietization to Buryatia and Kalmykia, the clergy were reduced.

=== Vietnam ===
During the First Indochina War, Buddhists living under the communist-led Viet Minh faced greater repression than those under the nationalist State of Vietnam. They came into conflict with the attitudes and actions of militant atheist Viet Minh; many believers, both monastic and lay, became victims of repression. Numerous Buddhist leaders in Viet Minh areas were isolated and placed under restrictions. Particularly since 1975, Buddhism has faced hostility from the communist regime in Vietnam. According to Human Rights News, "Vietnam continues to systematically imprison and persecute independent Buddhists as well as followers of other religions." The leaders of the Unified Buddhist Church of Vietnam, Thích Huyền Quang and Thích Quảng Độ, were imprisoned for decades. Thích Nhất Hạnh has spoken out about the wiping out of his spiritual tradition in Vietnam.

== See also ==
- History of Buddhism

== Bibliography ==
- Chakma, Kabita; Hill, Glen (2013). "Indigenous Women and Culture in the Colonized Chittagong Hills Tracts of Bangladesh". In Kamala Visweswaran (ed.). Everyday Occupations: Experiencing Militarism in South Asia and the Middle East. University of Pennsylvania Press. pp. 132–157. ISBN 978-0812244878.
- Codrington, H. W. (1926). A Short History Of Ceylon. London: Macmillan & Co.
- de Silva, K. M. (1981). A History of Sri Lanka. University of California Press. ISBN 9780520043206.
- de Silva, K. M. (2005). A History of Sri Lanka. Colombo: Vijitha Yapa Publications. ISBN 9789558095928.
- Gray, Richard A. (1994). "Genocide in the Chittagong Hill tracts of Bangladesh". Reference Services Review. 22 (4): 59–79. doi:10.1108/eb049231.
- Indrapala, K. (1969). "Early Tamil Settlements in Ceylon". The Journal of the Ceylon Branch of the Royal Asiatic Society of Great Britain & Ireland. 13. JSTOR: 43–63. JSTOR 43483465.
- O'Brien, Sharon (2004). "The Chittagong Hill Tracts". In Dinah Shelton (ed.). Encyclopedia of Genocide and Crimes against Humanity. Macmillan Library Reference. pp. 176–177.
- Mey, Wolfgang, ed. (1984). Genocide in the Chittagong Hill Tracts, Bangladesh. Copenhagen: International Work Group for Indigenous Affairs (IWGIA).
- Mohsin, A. (2003). The Chittagong Hill Tracts, Bangladesh: On the Difficult Road to Peace. Boulder, Col.: Lynne Rienner Publishers.
- Roy, Rajkumari (2000). Land Rights of the Indigenous Peoples of the Chittagong Hill Tracts, Bangladesh. Copenhagen: International Work Group for Indigenous Affairs.
