= 1955 State of Vietnam referendum =

Referendum that abolished the monarchy

- 23 October 1955
- Should the State of Vietnam become a Republic or remain a Monarchy?

Results
Choice	Votes	%
Republic	5,721,735	98.91%
Monarchy	63,017	1.09%
Valid votes	5,784,752	100.00%
Invalid or blank votes	0	0.00%
Total votes	5,784,752	100.00%
Registered voters/turnout	5,335,668	108.42%

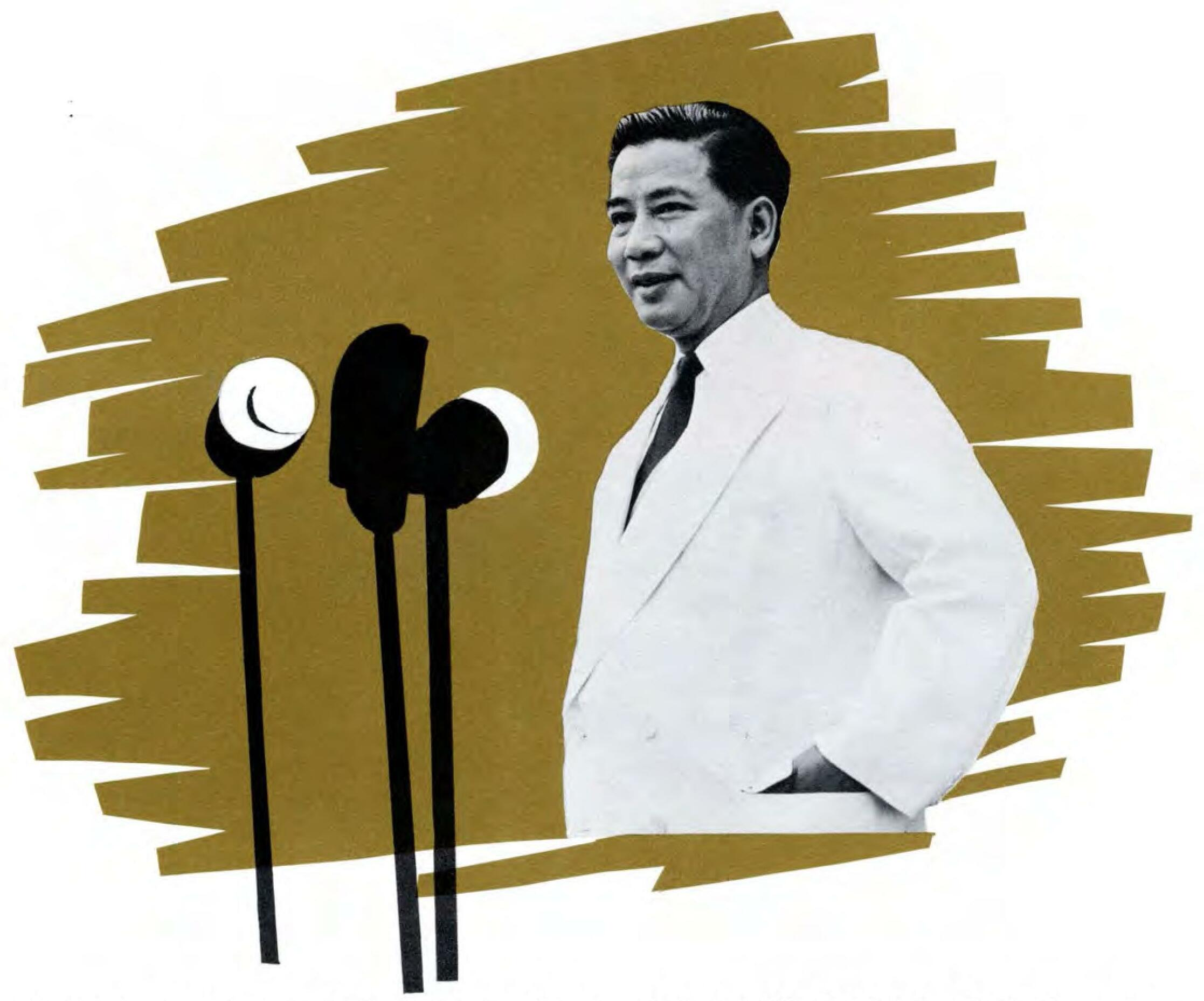
Ngô Đình Diệm declared himself president of the newly proclaimed Republic of Vietnam after referendum vote.

A referendum was held in the State of Vietnam (South Vietnam) to determine whether the country was a republic or monarchy. It was primarily a contest between Prime Minister Ngô Đình Diệm, who proposed a republic, and former emperor Bảo Đại, who had abdicated in 1945 and at the time of the referendum held the title of chief of state.

The referendum was the last phase in the power struggle between Bảo Đại and his prime minister. In June 1954, Bảo Đại had appointed Diệm in recognition of his staunch anticommunist and anticolonialist stance, as well as his potential to secure American aid. The country was then going through a period of insecurity, as Vietnam had been partitioned as a result of the 1954 Geneva Accords that ended the First Indochina War. The State of Vietnam controlled the southern half of the country, pending national elections that were intended to reunify the country under a single government. Still, the Vietnamese National Army was not in full control of southern Vietnam; the Cao Đài and Hòa Hảo religious sects ran their own administrations in the countryside supported by private armies, while the Bình Xuyên organised crime syndicate controlled the streets of Saigon. Despite interference from these groups, Bảo Đại, and French officials, Diệm managed to subdue the private armies and consolidate government control over the country by mid-1955.

Emboldened by his success, Diệm began to plot Bảo Đại's downfall. He scheduled a referendum for 23 October 1955 and pushed Bảo Đại out of the political scene, hindering the former emperor's attempts to derail the poll. In the period leading up to the vote, campaigning for Bảo Đại was banned, while Diệm's election campaign focused on personal attacks against Bảo Đại. These included pornographic cartoons of the head of state and unverified rumours claiming he was illegitimate and linking him to various mistresses. The government-controlled media launched polemical attacks on Bảo Đại, and police went door-to-door, warning people of the consequences of failing to vote. After his brother Ngô Đình Nhu had rigged the referendum, Diệm proclaimed himself president of the newly created Republic of Vietnam on 26 October 1955. A year later, the republic promulgated a constitution and established its own parliament.

== Background ==
The defeat of the French Union forces at Điện Biên Phủ in 1954, followed by the Geneva Accords, led to a divided Vietnam. The French-backed State of Vietnam, led by former Emperor Bảo Đại, provisionally held control south of the 17th parallel. Hồ Chí Minh's Viet Minh held the north under the Democratic Republic of Vietnam, which Hồ Chí Minh had proclaimed in 1945. The agreements stated that nationwide elections were to be held in 1956 to unify the country under a common government. In July 1954, during the transition period, Bảo Đại appointed Diệm as Prime Minister of the State of Vietnam. However the State of Vietnam as an independent government did not sign the agreement.

On 11 October 1954, the border was closed by the International Control Commission, after a period of 300 days during which free passage between both halves of Vietnam had been allowed. Under the Geneva Accords, anti-communist military personnel were obliged to evacuate to the south, while communist forces were to be moved north. Civilians were free to move to whichever zone they preferred. The issue was a topic of concern for either side throughout the course of the 300 days: Operation Freedom Passage followed with transportation options for civilians to move to the south, and Diệm authorizing U.S. CIA adviser Colonel Edward Lansdale to stage campaign intended to convince more people to move to South Vietnam. As the majority of evacuees were Catholics, communist propaganda claimed that American propaganda had deceived them into believing that the Virgin Mary had gone to the South. The CIA's efforts played a minimal role, as Catholic migrants were driven primarily by their own convictions and circumstances rather than external psyops. Northern émigrés played a significant role in shaping anticommunist discourse in South Vietnam, and many of the most leading voices were not Catholic. The Viet Minh attempted to prevent the transport in rural areas, and spread rumours of its own considering the threats of moving south, and Task Force 90 in particular. In the end, between eight hundred thousand and one million people migrated to the South. In early 1955, French forces began withdrawing, leaving Diệm temporarily in control of the South.

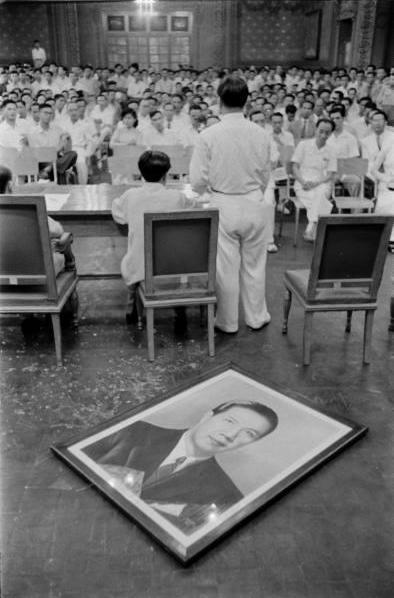
Anti-Bảo Đại revolutionists at Saigon City Hall, May 1955

At the time, Diệm had little authority beyond the gates of his own palace. Bảo Đại had little confidence in him and gave him meagre support—the pair had clashed in the past, with Diệm resigning as Bảo Đại's Interior Minister two decades earlier, believing the head of state to be weak and ineffective. Many historians believe that Bảo Đại may have selected Diệm for the latter's ability to attract U.S. support and funding. During the transition period, the French Expeditionary Corps maintained a presence in South Vietnam. This led to tension between France and the State of Vietnam. Diệm, a passionate nationalist, detested the French, who reciprocated, hoping he would fail, even calling for his removal on occasions.

Diệm faced challenges to his authority from four more groups. The Hòa Hảo and Cao Đài religious sects had private armies that controlled the Mekong Delta and the areas west of Saigon, respectively. The Bình Xuyên was an armed, organised crime empire that controlled much of Saigon with a 40,000 strong private army, while the Vietminh still controlled several rural areas. Diệm's Vietnamese National Army (VNA) was led by General Nguyễn Văn Hinh, a French citizen who loathed and frequently disobeyed him. Bảo Đại sold the operating license of the national police to the Bình Xuyên, effectively putting administrative control of the police in the hands of a crime syndicate.

Amid growing French and US skepticism of his ability to provide stable rule, Diệm forced the matter to a head in April 1955. He ordered the Bình Xuyên to relinquish control of the National Police and submit to his command by integrating into the VNA or disbanding, threatening to crush them if they refused. He bribed Hòa Hảo and Cao Đài commanders into joining the VNA, gradually resulting in the defection of some commanders and their units, while others continued to lead their forces against Saigon. The Bình Xuyên defied Diệm's ultimatum. On 27 April, the VNA initiated the Battle for Saigon. After a brief but violent battle that left between 500 and 1,000 people dead and about 20,000 homeless, the Bình Xuyên were crushed. Diệm had regained both U.S. confidence and control of the police. Jubilant crowds lauded Diệm and denounced Bảo Đại, who had tried to dismiss him in the middle of the battle to prevent him from quelling the Bình Xuyên. In addition, General Paul Ely, the head of the French presence in Vietnam, tried to impede Diệm; his troops put road blocks against the VNA and gave intelligence to the Bình Xuyên.

Buoyed by his successes, and fueled by increased hatred of both the French and Bảo Đại after their attempts to prevent him from dismantling the Bình Xuyên, Diệm became more confident as he went about consolidating his hold on power. On 15 May, Diệm abolished Bảo Đại's Imperial Guard; its 5,000 men became the 11th and 42nd Infantry Regiments of the VNA. Diệm then stripped Bảo Đại of his extensive crown lands. On 15 June, Diệm had the Council of the Royal Family at Huế declare that Bảo Đại be stripped of his powers, and that he, Diệm, be made president. Bảo Đại's relatives condemned him for abdicating as head of state, and for his links with France and the Bình Xuyên. Historians have speculated that the royals agreed to turn on Bảo Đại so Diệm would not seize their assets.

== Organization of the referendum ==
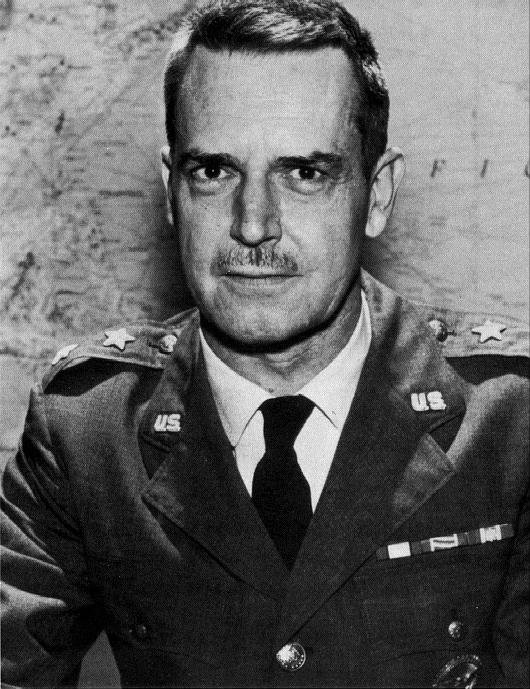
Colonel Edward Lansdale, who helped Diệm in his campaign

On 7 July 1955, the first anniversary of his installation as prime minister, Diệm announced that a national referendum would be held to determine the future of the country. On 16 July, Diệm publicly announced his intention to not take part in the reunification elections: "We will not be tied down by the [Geneva] treaty that was signed against the wishes of the Vietnamese people."

Diệm contended that the Communists would never allow free elections in the north, so therefore South Vietnam must strike out on its own and establish a separate, non-Communist state. This was echoed by the Saigon press, which ran articles assailing communist elections as shambolic, rigged, and meaningless; at the time, the northern half of Vietnam had a greater population than the south. A month earlier, North Vietnamese Prime Minister Phạm Văn Đồng wrote to Saigon asking to begin negotiations over the specific details of the elections. While the Americans were happy to avoid elections because of fears of a communist victory, they hoped that Diệm would enter the dialogue over planning matters and wait for North Vietnam to object to a proposal, and thus use it to blame the communists for violating the Geneva Accords. The Americans had earlier advised Diệm, who had been acting in defiance of Bảo Đại, that continued aid was contingent on Diệm establishing a legal basis for usurping the head of state's power.

On 6 October 1955, Diệm announced the referendum would be held on 23 October. The election was open to men and women aged 18 or over, and the government arranged to have a polling station set up for every 1,000 registered voters. The poll was contested by Bảo Đại, who had spent much of his time in France and advocated a monarchy, and Diệm, who ran on a republican platform. According to historian Jessica Chapman, it was a choice between "the country's obsolete emperor and its far-from-popular prime minister, Ngô Đình Diệm". In announcing the referendum, Diệm portrayed his decision as being motivated by a love of democracy and popular discontent with the rule of Bảo Đại. The prime minister cited a plethora of petitions from various social, religious, and political groups calling on him to stage a plebiscite to remove Bảo Đại, claiming he was motivated by these "legitimate and democratic" sentiments. U.S. officials advised Diệm to claim 60% and 70% of the vote to make the election look plausible.

Under the Elysee Accords and the subsequent legislation that created the State of Vietnam in 1949, Bảo Đại's position as head of state was neither permanent nor indefinite. Sovereignty was presumed to rest solely upon the people, with Bảo Đại being a mere conduit. As a result, the referendum itself was within the law. Diệm had not been elected to his post, so he saw the referendum as an opportunity to rebuff opponents, who claimed that he was undemocratic and autocratic. The event also gave Diệm an opportunity to boost his prestige by defeating Bảo Đại in a head-to-head contest. It was previously agreed that a National Assembly would be elected first, but Diệm went ahead with the plebiscite, which meant that he would have total power if he deposed Bảo Đại before a legislature was formed.

U.S. diplomats were concerned that the move would be seen as a power grab, as Diệm was organising and driving an electoral process in which he was a candidate. The Americans felt that a legislature should be formed first and that the body should oversee the referendum, but Diệm ignored their advice. Ambassador G. Frederick Reinhardt informed Washington that Diệm had no intention of allowing a level playing field for the opposition, and that the foreign press had already made much of Diệm's democratic pronouncements being a facade. The Department of State agreed and opted to avoid trumpeting the referendum as an exercise in democracy for fear of attracting negative reactions to their foreign policy. Nevertheless, U.S. officials in Vietnam were pleased with the referendum, as they saw it as an opportunity to strengthen South Vietnam and avoid defeat to the communists, as they saw a republican model as being more robust.

Having declared his disdain for the 1956 reunification elections, Diệm saw the referendum as the first step in creating a long-term state to rule over South Vietnam. He repeatedly said that the creation of a legislature and a constitution for his new state would follow the referendum.

Diệm reportedly saw the poll as an opportunity to legitimise him as a symbol of Vietnamese democracy, so that he could frame and justify his refusal to participate in national elections as a struggle between freedom and communist authoritarianism. Diệm asserted that South Vietnam would eventually reunify the nation under a democratic administration and liberate their northern compatriots from communist oppression, and championed the referendum as a first step in nurturing democracy. His support base was to use this as a means of justifying the deposal of Bảo Đại, citing past decisions that according to them, were pro-communist.

One of Diệm's main themes was that the referendum would usher in a new era of unprecedented democracy: "This shall be but the first step made by our people in the free use of our political rights." The day before the poll, Diệm said: "This 23 October, for the first time in our country's history, our men and women will exercise one of many basic civil rights of a democracy, the right to vote." A government proclamation four days before the poll said: "Dear compatriots, proclaim your will forcefully! Go forward firmly in the path of Freedom, Independence and Democracy!"

== Campaign ==
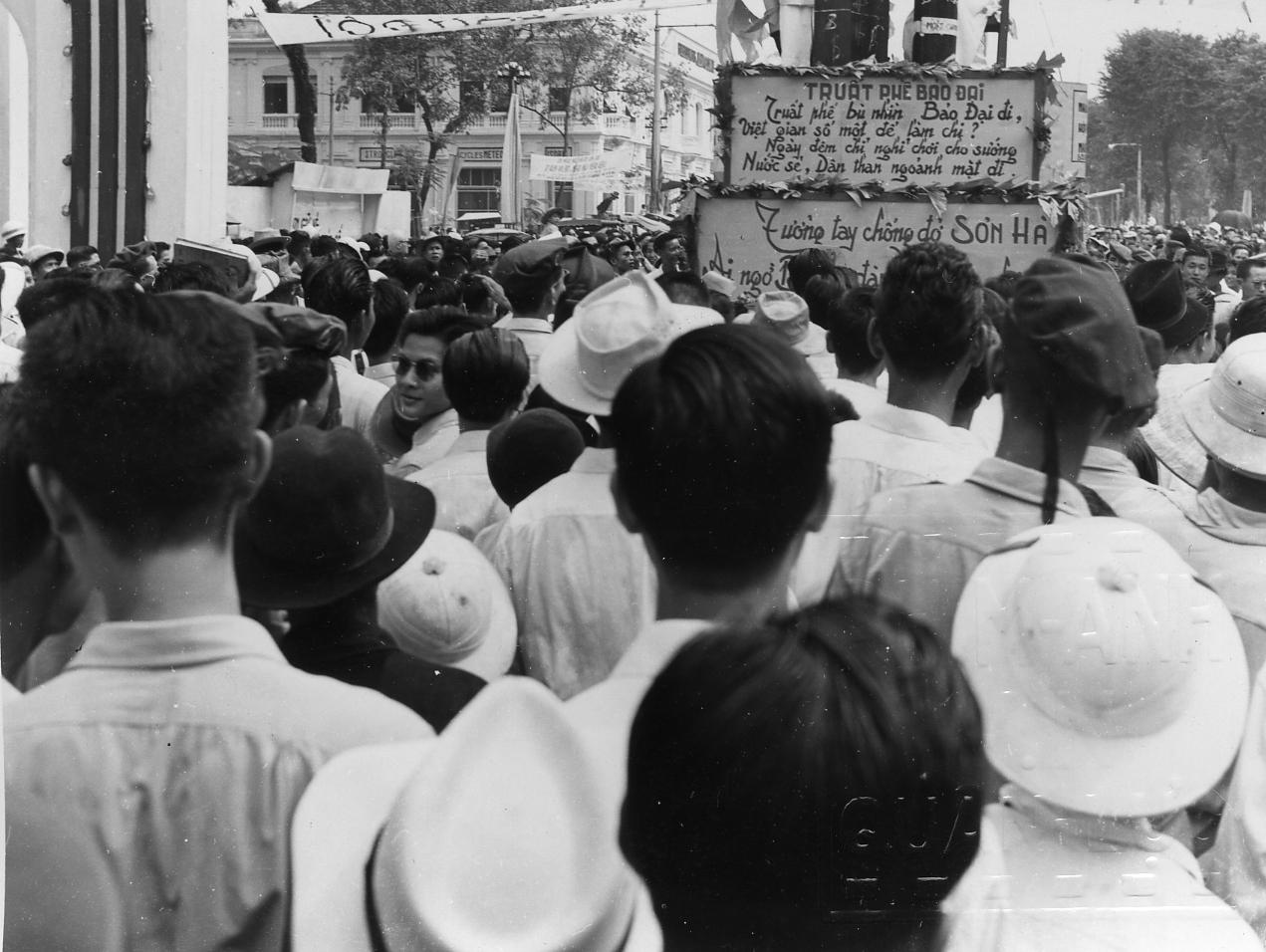
Banner calling for the deposition of Bảo Đại

Diệm ran a personal attack campaign against the head of state, for whom campaigning was prohibited. The army and national police went about enforcing the ban on pro-Bảo Đại and anti-Diệm activities. Police went from door to door, explaining the consequences of failing to vote. They organized conferences in rural villages and addressed the populace with loudspeakers. In general, Diệm's line of attack was to portray Bảo Đại as a drunken womanizer who was preoccupied with immoral pleasures and unconcerned with the problems of the populace. Vietnam's monarchic tradition was built on Confucianism and the emperor's Mandate of Heaven, and Diệm's campaign claimed Bảo Đại had lost this mandate through his debauched lifestyle. According to Joseph Buttinger, who was based in Vietnam as the second in command at the International Rescue Committee, the methods used to influence the poll were "outrageous". Donald Lancaster, a journalist who covered the poll, said "Whereas Bảo Đại was given no opportunity to defend himself, the government-controlled press proceeded to overwhelm him with scurrilous abuse." Diệm later banned Bảo Đại from entering the State of Vietnam.

Diệm's advertising included the parading of giant pageant-style floats of Bảo Đại through the streets of Saigon, depicted with bags of money on his shoulders, a deck of cards in his hands, and with naked blonde women and a bottle of cognac in his arms. This was a reference to the head of state's reputation for opulence, gambling and womanising. In particular, the blonde hair referred to Bảo Đại's purported penchant for European mistresses with whom he liaised on the French Riviera. Bảo Đại's dummy was accompanied by that of a Frenchman putting gold into his pockets, thereby questioning his nationalist credentials. Posters and effigies with Bảo Đại having a pig's head were disseminated, while a prominent newspaper composed and encouraged the people to sing songs insulting Bảo Đại.

Walls and public transport were plastered with slogans, including "Beware of the evil king Bảo Đại's preference for gambling, women, wine, milk, and butter. Whoever votes for him is a traitor." Aside from referring to his opulent lifestyle, other slogans such as "Bảo Đại, the traitorous puppet king", and "Bảo Đại, warden of gambling dens and brothels", referred to his alleged softness towards the communists. The radio was used to verbally abuse Bảo Đại, accusing him of treason and corruption.

On the other hand, Diệm was described as a "hero of the people" and "father of the nation". Some slogans exhorted the populace to vote for Diệm: "To vote for Ngô Đình Diệm's revolutionary cause is to build a society of welfare and justice", portraying him as a patriotic man tough on communism, proclaiming to "kill communists, depose the king, [and] struggle against colonialists is a citizen's duty in a free Vietnam."

Diệm's government-controlled press overwhelmed Bảo Đại with endless personal propaganda attacks, with special editions of newspapers being devoted to polemical biographical accounts of the former emperor. This allowed Diệm's campaign to condemn Bảo Đại with much more salacious detail than was possible through mere slogans. This started in August when the daily newspaper Thoi Dai started a three-week series that disseminated unsubstantiated and scandalous details about Bảo Đại's life. These were written by editorialist Hong Van, who called Bảo Đại a "cockroach who sold his country for personal glory". Van claimed Bảo Đại was the illegitimate son of Emperor Khải Định, alleging Khải Định had been infertile and married a maid, before claiming the maid's son, by another man, as his own. The paper claimed Bảo Đại was "big yet foolish, had many children, and was very fond of women" while Khải Định was uncomfortable with females, hinting that the different personalities were inconsistent with a common biological lineage.

Capitalising on anti-French sentiment, the paper went on to discuss Bảo Đại's upbringing in France, claiming that he was already womanising as a teenager because of his European upbringing. Bảo Đại later married an ethnic Vietnamese French citizen, who became Empress Nam Phương, who had been raised Catholic. The editorials accused her of being a French agent and claimed she had treated the queen mother badly, a serious character flaw as Confucianism strongly emphasized respect for elders. Hong Van went on to claim that Bảo Đại's sequence of Gallic lovers was an indication that colonial officials were successfully using sex to turn the head of state into a puppet of France.

The culmination of the newspaper campaign was a satirical pornographic cartoon, entitled "The Story of Bảo Đại". It summarized the scandalous depictions of the head of state made by Thoi Dai in the preceding weeks and was published on 19 October, four days before the referendum. The pictures featured full frontal nude depictions of Bảo Đại and his mistresses, their genitalia prominently exposed, including a frame showing a naked blonde performing an erotic dance for the head of state.

Aside from painting Bảo Đại as a sexually insatiable glutton, Diệm's campaign also attacked the head of state's nationalist credentials. They criticised him as being too soft in his dealings with French colonial authorities, and for serving as the head of state of the Empire of Vietnam, a regime set up by Imperial Japan after they invaded during World War II. They also accused him of ceding half the country to the communists. The communists had already captured more than half the country on the battlefield, and Bảo Đại claimed he had no choice, but Diệm's campaign portrayed him as incompetent and unwilling to take the blame.

Diệm used the Ministry of Information's electoral education campaign as a partisan political tool. Instead of using it purely to explain the democratic process, the campaign was used to extol Diệm and his allies. After explaining what democracy was, a pamphlet outlined why Deposing a chief-of-state is a vital act. After elaborating on the powers of the head of state, the pamphlet went on to champion Diệm as an anti-communist who could defend people's freedom, while explaining why Bảo Đại was unfit to lead, saying that he did not have respect among the international community.

On 15 October, Bảo Đại issued a statement protesting against the referendum. He urged the governments of France, the United Kingdom, the United States, India and even the Soviet Union not to recognise Diệm, asserting that he was an obstacle to the reunification of Vietnam under the Geneva Accords. He accused Diệm's poll of being "a governmental activity which conforms neither to the profound sentiment of the Vietnamese people nor to the common cause of peace".

On 18 October, he made the token gesture of formally dismissing Diệm. The following day, he denounced "the police methods" of Diệm's "dictatorship" and warned the Vietnamese populace "against a regime that was bound to lead them to ruin, famine, and war". Bảo Đại accused Diệm of trying to foment conflict between the French and the Americans. On the eve of the poll, Bảo Đại stated "I can even tell you that I know the percentage of favourable votes that Mr. Diệm has decided to obtain."

== Other opposition ==
The staging of the election was subsidised by foreign funding. The United States government and a combination of American Roman Catholic charities contributed US$2 million each. Ba Cụt, a leader of an anti-government Hòa Hảo religious sect, distributed a pamphlet condemning Diệm as an American puppet, citing the funding as proof and further asserting that Diệm was going to "Catholicize" the country. The Vietnamese Socialist Party, which was affiliated to the Hòa Hảo, claimed Diệm had "bribed the world of laborers and young students to petition in support of Diệm's rise to chief-of-state and to petition in favor of deposing Bao Dai", using the American election funding. Another Hòa Hảo rebel leader, General Trần Văn Soái, assailed Diệm's undemocratic regime and declared the referendum illegal. He invited "friendly countries and the people of Vietnam to distrust this political maneuver". Diệm had earlier told a cabinet minister that there was only one political party and went about eradicating opposition by force. Opponents claimed Diệm's declarations about the value of democracy were hollow.

== Logistics and voting ==
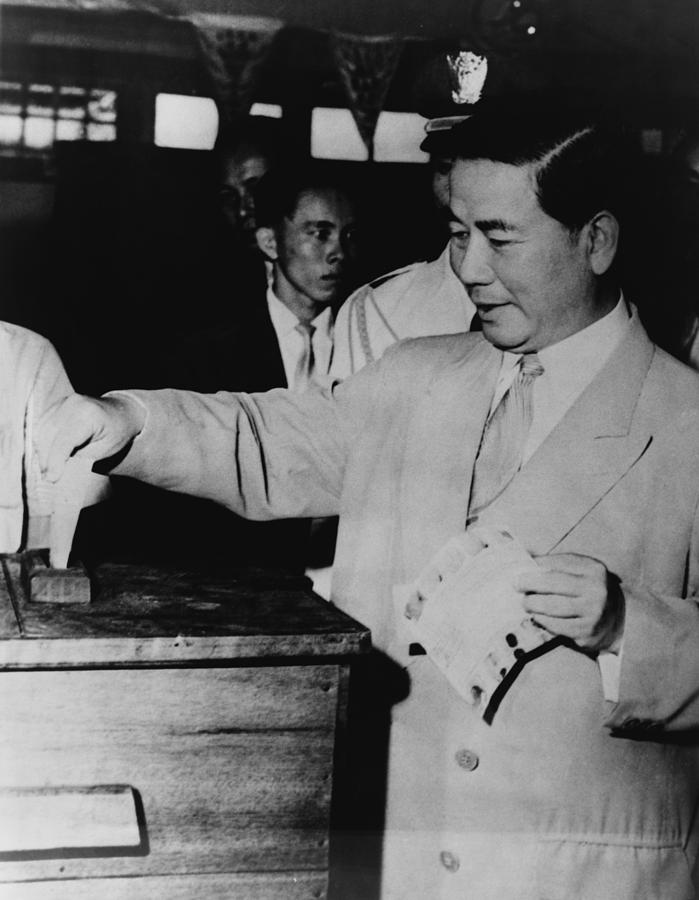
Ngô Đình Diệm during the voting.

Lansdale advised Diệm to print his ballots in red, while those of Bảo Đại were printed in green. In Vietnam, red is associated with good luck and prosperity, whereas green is often associated with a cuckold and bad luck. Diệm's red ballots pictured him with youthful and modern-looking people, while Bảo Đại was placed in the old-fashioned robes he never wore. In addition, Bảo Đại's portrait showed him to appear dazed and bloated, while Diệm and those surrounding him were smiling and appeared to be energetic. The ballot claimed that a vote for Diệm would be a vote for democracy, stating "I depose Bảo Đại and recognise Ngô Đình Diệm as Head of State, charged with the commission of setting up a democratic regime." Bảo Đại's ballot read "I do not depose Bảo Đại and do not regard Ngô Đình Diệm as the Head of State charged with the commission of setting up a democratic regime." The voters would place the red or green ballot into the box, according to their preference, while discarding the other, which meant the voting was actually not secret.

The logistics of the referendum were organised and supervised by Diệm's brother and confidant, Ngô Đình Nhu, who was the leader of the family's secret Personalist Labor Revolutionary Party, which supplied the Ngôs' electoral base. Reports of violence and intimidation were widespread. During the referendum, Nhu's staff told voters to throw away the green ballots. Those who disobeyed were often chased down and beaten, with pepper sauce and water sometimes being forced into their nostrils. The violations were particularly flagrant in central Vietnam, a region over which another of Diệm's younger brothers, Ngô Đình Cẩn, ruled. Cẩn was based in the former imperial capital city of Huế, home of the Nguyễn dynasty and a source of support for Bảo Đại. He stifled this support by ordering the police to arrest 1,200 people for political reasons in the week leading up to the vote. In the city of Hội An, several people were killed in election violence on the day of the poll. Voting started at 07:00 and ended at 17:00.

== Counting and results ==
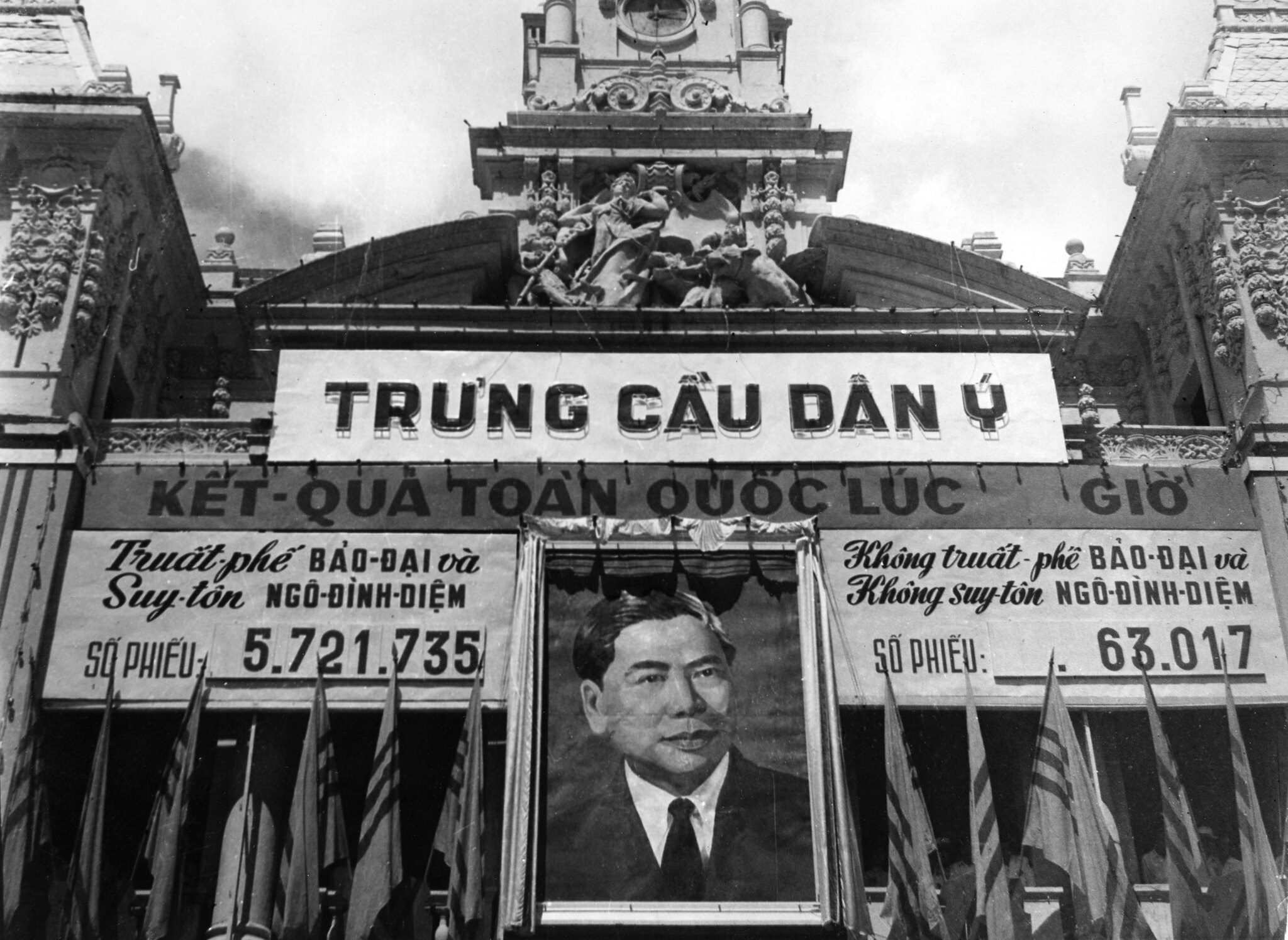
The results on display at the Saigon City Hall.

Diệm's government formulated procedural regulations ostensibly designed to ensure results and ballots were correctly accounted for and to prevent election fraud. In reality however, the votes were counted without independent supervision, which resulted in Diệm being credited with 98.9% of the vote. The prime minister tallied 605,025 votes in Saigon, although only 450,000 voters were registered in the capital. Diệm's tally also exceeded the registration numbers in other districts. French newspapers claimed that only half of the registered voters in Saigon had actually voted, and that the rest had boycotted the election, implying that more than 60% of the votes in the capital were not authentic. Defenders of Diệm claim this was due to recently arrived, mostly Catholic, refugees from North Vietnam who voted without being enrolled, rather than large-scale ballot stuffing.

Diệm's regime had announced that 5,335,668 people were eligible to vote, but when the results were declared, there were 5,784,752 ballots. Diệm's government claimed his candidacy had been endorsed by the mother of Bảo Đại, although Diệm had ordered the military to confiscate her family's property and evict her from the land. The near unanimous voter turnout and support for Diệm was replicated in Central Highlands and Mekong Delta swamp areas, which were not even under the control of the government and its Vietnamese National Army. In some districts of the Mekong Delta, overwhelming tallies for Diệm in excess of 90% of the registered voters were recorded, even though the Hòa Hảo warlord Ba Cụt and his army had prevented voting.

The referendum was widely condemned for being fraudulent. Historian and writer Jessica Chapman said "Even Diệm apologists like Anthony Trawick Bouscaren and American CIA officer Edward Lansdale concur with the prime minister's harshest critics on the conclusion that the South Vietnamese government was either incapable of or unwilling to hold a truly free, representative plebiscite". A CIA report written in 1966 adjudged the poll to be the most heavily manipulated in the first 11 years of South Vietnam's history. The U.S. government privately concluded that the monopoly Diệm had on the media and the election campaign was a greater factor in the victory than intimidation and the fact that the voting was effectively public. Reinhardt cabled Washington, saying that the "referendum proved [a] resounding success for [the] Diệm government". He indicated that the poll results were not necessarily a reflection of reality by adding that the result did not show that Diệm had majority support but that he was able to control the country, effectively unchallenged. The U.S. government was heartened by Diệm's apparent ability to negate communist and other opposition.

The scholar Bernard B. Fall stated that "there is not the slightest doubt that this plebiscite was only a shade more fraudulent than most electoral tests under a dictatorship". The American journalist Stanley Karnow cited the dubious plebiscite as evidence of Diệm's "mandarin mentality". Chapman wrote that "... no amount of unilateral campaigning, anti-Bảo Đại sentiment, or Confucian political restraint could explain Diệm's 98 percent margin of victory in a politically heterogeneous South Vietnam. Corruption and intimidation must have played a significant role." Buttinger said that while the monarchy was "another rotten relic of Vietnam's past" and Bảo Đại "its last, unworthy representative", fraud and intimidation were unnecessary as Diệm would have won easily in any event. Historian David Anderson said the victory "was not a true representation of Diệm's power or popularity. The emperor's weakness, the disarray of the political opposition, and other such factors explain his triumph".

Choice	Votes	%
Monarchy	63,017	1.09
Republic	5,721,735	98.91
Total	5,784,752	100.00
Registered voters/turnout	5,335,668	–
Source: Direct Democracy

== Reaction and aftermath ==
Three days after the vote, Diệm proclaimed the creation of the Republic of Vietnam, naming himself as its president. He said "The October 23rd plebiscite in which [the people of South Vietnam] took such an enthusiastic part, constitutes an approval of the policies pursued thus far and at the same time augurs a whole new era for the future of our country." Diệm reiterated that he would not partake in national reunification elections, saying that they would be futile unless "true liberty" came about in the communist North Vietnam, which impressed American observers, who feared a total communist takeover.

Having claimed the election was entirely without irregularities, the United States government hailed Diệm as a new hero of the "free world". Senator Mike Mansfield (D-Mont.) claimed the referendum "was a reflection of their [the Vietnamese people's] search for a leader who would respond to their needs ... they sensed that Diệm could provide that kind of leadership." Mansfield had been a professor of Asian history before entering politics; as a result his opinions about Vietnam were more influential and held in high regard by his fellow senators. Archives of policy discussions show that the Americans were concerned more about the negative image created by Diệm's autocratic and antidemocratic style among the international community, rather than its possible effects on national cohesion. The US State Department spokesman said "the people of Viet-Nam have spoken, and we, of course, recognise their decision". An official congratulatory statement from the department said "The Department of State is gratified that according to reports the referendum was conducted in such an orderly and efficient manner and that the people of Viet-Nam have made their choice unmistakably clear ... we look forward to a continuation of the friendly relations between the Government of Viet-Nam and the United States."

Reaction to Diệm's victory among the American press varied with geographic location. Newspapers in the Midwest hailed Diệm's win as a triumph for democracy and extolled the new president as a champion of democracy. However, The New York Times said that the extreme margin of victory made "Diệm's administrative control look more pervasive than is thought to be the case by a number of observers here." However, the paper also obligingly claimed the poll a "sound democratic procedure" and a "public tribute to a strong-willed leader". Reader's Digest called it an "overwhelming endorsement" and dubbed Diệm a "beacon of light, showing the way to free people".

Diệm's victory was seen as a blow to French stature in Vietnam, as the former colonial power had helped to set up Bảo Đại's State of Vietnam in 1949. They consistently opposed Diệm and his policies, and unsuccessfully tried to impede him. The U.S. media regarded Diệm's victory as a signal that the United States would be the only Western power in South Vietnam. Some felt that this would enable Diệm to rule effectively without French hindrance, while others felt that this would leave too much of a burden on the American government. The French media and diplomatic corps viewed the result as a humiliation. Before the poll, French officials had privately predicted Diệm would dissolve the French High Command and use any victory as justification for scrapping the national reunification elections. The French media viewed the poll as undemocratic and a plot by the Americans to sabotage any prospect of national reunification, but France recognised the Republic of Vietnam soon after.

Diệm severed economic relations with France on 9 December 1955, and withdrew from the French Union shortly afterwards. Neither the Soviet Union nor the People's Republic of China overtly objected to Diệm's actions in creating a new state in the southern half of Vietnam. Nevertheless, by the time of Diệm's deposal and assassination in 1963, France bought 46.3% of South Vietnam's exports and accounted for most of the foreign investment in the country. French cultural influences and the language remained prevalent.

In January 1956, with no legislature and constitution in place, Diệm used his absolute power to dissolve the Revolutionary Council by launching police raids on the members, forcing those from the Cao Đài and Hòa Hảo who had rallied to his side to go on the run. As a result, they turned against him.

== Sources ==
- Brownell, William (1963). The American Mandarin: a study of the life of Diem and of the origins of the American involvements. Ithaca, New York: Cornell University.
- Buttinger, Joseph (1967). Vietnam: A Dragon Embattled. Praeger Publishers.
- Chapman, Jessica (September 2006). "Staging Democracy: South Vietnam's 1955 Referendum to Depose Bao Dai". Diplomatic History. 30 (4): 671–703. doi:10.1111/j.1467-7709.2006.00573.x.
- Fall, Bernard B. (1963). The Two Viet-Nams. Praeger Publishers. ISBN 0-8133-0092-4.
- Jacobs, Seth (2006). Cold War Mandarin: Ngo Dinh Diem and the Origins of America's War in Vietnam. Lanham, Maryland: Rowman & Littlefield. ISBN 0-7425-4447-8.
- Karnow, Stanley (1997). Vietnam: A history. New York City: Penguin Books. ISBN 0-670-84218-4.
- Langguth, A. J. (2000). Our Vietnam. Simon & Schuster. ISBN 0-684-81202-9.
- Maclear, Michael (1981). Vietnam: The ten thousand day war. Methuen. ISBN 0-423-00580-4.
- Miller, Edward (2004). Grand Designs, Vision, Power and Nation Building in America's Alliance with Ngo Dinh Diem, 1954–1960. UMI.
- Moyar, Mark (2006). Triumph Forsaken: The Vietnam War, 1954–1965. New York City: Cambridge University Press. ISBN 0-521-86911-0.
- Roberts, Priscilla, ed. (2006). Behind the bamboo curtain: China, Vietnam, and the world beyond Asia. Stanford University Press. ISBN 0-8047-5502-7.
- Tucker, Spencer C. (2000). Encyclopedia of the Vietnam War. ABC-CLIO. ISBN 1-57607-040-9.
