= Langadu =

Langadu may refer to:

- Langadu Upazila, an upazila of Rangamati District
- Langadu Union, a union of Langadu Upazila under Rangamati District
