= Kalapakujya Union =

Union of Rangamati District, Chittagong, Bangladesh

Kalapakujya কালাপাকুজ্যা
- Union
- Interactive map of Kalapakujya
- Country: Bangladesh
- Division: Chittagong Division
- District: Rangamati District
- Upazila: Langadu Upazila

Area
  - Total: 15.5 km^{2} (6.0 sq mi)

Population (2022)
  - Total: 8,625
  - Density: 556/km^{2} (1,440/sq mi)
- Time zone: UTC+6 (BST)
- Postal code: 4580
- Website: kalapakujjaup.rangamati.gov.bd

Kalapakujya Union is a union of Langadu Upazila under Rangamati District.

== Demography ==
According to 2022 census, the total population of the Union is 8,625, all of whom are Muslims, except two Hindus.

Religion-2022
1. Islam (100.0%)
2. Hinduism (0.02%)
3. Others (0.00%)
