= Bagachatar Union =

Union of Rangamati District, Chittagong, Bangladesh

Bagachatar বগাচতর
- Union
- Interactive map of Bagachatar
- Country: Bangladesh
- Division: Chittagong Division
- District: Rangamati District
- Upazila: Langadu Upazila

Area
  - Total: 62.16 km^{2} (24.00 sq mi)

Population (2022)
  - Total: 14,643
  - Density: 235.6/km^{2} (610.1/sq mi)
- Time zone: UTC+6 (BST)
- Postal code: 4580
- Website: bogachattarup.rangamati.gov.bd

Bagachatar Union is a union of Langadu Upazila under Rangamati District.

== Demography ==
According to 2022 census, total population of the Union are 14,643. Among them, 12,833 are Muslim, 1,610 are Buddhist, 156 are Hindu and 44 are Christian.

Religion-2022
1. Islam (87.6%)
2. Buddhism (11.0%)
3. Hinduism (1.06%)
4. Christianity (0.30%)
5. Others (0.00%)

== Ethnicity ==
This Union is home to a variety of different ethnic groups. Among them, 13,248 are Bengali, 1,347 are Chakma and 48 are of others ethnic groups.

Ethnicity-2022
1. Bengali (90.5%)
2. Chakma (9.20%)
3. Others (0.33%)
