= Mainimukh Union =

Union of Rangamati District, Chittagong, Bangladesh

Mainimukh মাইনীমুখ
- Union
- Interactive map of Mainimukh
- Country: Bangladesh
- Division: Chittagong Division
- District: Rangamati District
- Upazila: Langadu Upazila

Area
  - Total: 143.45 km^{2} (55.39 sq mi)

Population (2022)
  - Total: 19,013
  - Density: 132.54/km^{2} (343.28/sq mi)
- Time zone: UTC+6 (BST)
- Postal code: 4580
- Website: maeinimukhup.rangamati.gov.bd

Mainimukh Union is a union of Langadu Upazila under Rangamati District.

== Demography ==
According to 2022 census, total population of the Union are 19,013. Among them, 17,435 are Muslim, 972 are Buddhist, 605 are Hindu and 1 are Christian.

Religion-2022
1. Islam (91.7%)
2. Buddhism (5.11%)
3. Hinduism (3.18%)
4. Christianity (0.01%)
5. Others (0.00%)

== Ethnicity ==
This Union is home to a variety of different ethnic groups. Among them, 18,100 are Bengali, 904 are Chakma and 9 are of others ethnic groups.

Ethnicity-2022
1. Bengali (95.2%)
2. Chakma (4.75%)
3. Others (0.05%)
