= Atarakchhara Union =

Union of Rangamati District, Chittagong, Bangladesh

Atarakchhara আটারকছড়া
- Union
- Interactive map of Atarakchhara
- Country: Bangladesh
- Division: Chittagong Division
- District: Rangamati District
- Upazila: Langadu Upazila

Area
  - Total: 77.7 km^{2} (30.0 sq mi)

Population (2022)
  - Total: 13,171
  - Density: 170/km^{2} (439/sq mi)
- Time zone: UTC+6 (BST)
- Postal code: 4580
- Website: atarakcharaup.rangamati.gov.bd

Atarakchhara Union is a union of Langadu Upazila under Rangamati District.

== Demography ==
According to 2022 census, total population of the Union are 13,171. Among them, 5,936 are Muslim, 7,147 are Buddhist, 40 are Christian, 48 are Hindu and 7 follow others religion.

Religion-2022
1. Buddhism (54.3%)
2. Islam (45.1%)
3. Christianity (0.37%)
4. Hinduism (0.30%)
5. Others (0.00%)

== Ethnicity ==
This Union is home to a variety of different ethnic groups. Among them, 5,995 are Bengali, 7,148 are Chakma and 28 are of others ethnic groups.

Ethnicity-2022
1. Chakma (54.3%)
2. Bengali (45.5%)
3. Others (0.21%)
