= Unified Buddhist Church of Vietnam =

Buddhist organization in Vietnam

- Giáo Hội Phật Giáo Việt Nam Thống Nhất
- Flag
- Formation: January 4, 1964; 62 years ago
- Founded at: Huế, Vietnam
- Purpose: Buddhist sangha
- Headquarters: Phật Ân Temple, Long Thành District, Đồng Nai; Từ Hiếu Temple, Sài Gòn North America: Phật Đà Temple, San Diego, California; Liên Hoa Temple, Houston, Texas; Quang Thiện Temple, Ontario, Canada Europe: Viên Giác Temple, Hannover, Germany; Khánh Anh Temple, Évry-Courcouronnes, France Australia and New Zealand: Quảng Đức Monastery, Fawkner, Australia
- Sangharaja: Vacant
- Subsidiaries: Vietnamese Buddhist Youth Association; Vietnamese American Unified Buddhist Congregation; Vietnamese Australian and New Zealander Unified Buddhist Congregation; United Vietnamese Buddhist Congregation in Europe
- Remarks: Slogan: Phụng sự chúng sanh tức cúng dường chư Phật (Serving all sentient beings is offering to the Buddhas); Anthem: Phật Giáo Việt Nam (Buddhism in Vietnam)

The Unified Buddhist Sangha of Vietnam (Vietnamese: Giáo hội Phật giáo Việt Nam Thống nhất) was founded in 1964 as a nationwide Buddhist organization in South Vietnam. It was banned by the communist Vietnamese government in 1981, which favored the state-sponsored Buddhist Sangha of Vietnam. The Unified Buddhist Sangha continues to operate in exile outside Vietnam.

== History ==
Before the 1954 partition of Vietnam, the first national Buddhist organization was the General Buddhist Association of Vietnam, established in 1951. The Unified Buddhist Sangha of Vietnam was founded in 1964 to unify 11 of the 14 different sects of Vietnamese Buddhism which were present in South Vietnam at the time. The unification also came in response to the Diệm government's mishandling of the Buddhist crisis in 1963. During the Second Republic, the Sangha was divided into two factions: the moderate, Northern-dominated Quốc Tự, led by Thích Tâm Châu, and the larger, Central-dominated Ấn Quang, led by Thích Trí Quang and notably more hostile to the government.

The UBSV's patriarchs Thích Huyền Quang, and Thích Quảng Độ were under house arrest due to their opposition to strict government control of religion, which was established after the communists won the war in 1975.

In 1981, six years after the communist victory, the new government consolidated all Buddhist organizations under the umbrella group Buddhist Sangha of Vietnam and placed it under government control. The Unified Buddhist Church of Vietnam and all other non-sanctioned organizations were banned within Vietnam. The UBSV continues to operate in exile outside Vietnam.

== See also ==
- Thích Quảng Độ

== Bibliography ==
- Queen, Christopher S.; King, Sallie B. (1996). Thich Nhat Hanh and the Unified Church of Vietnam. In: Engaged Buddhism: Buddhist Liberation Movements in Asia. SUNY Press. pp. 321–. ISBN 978-0-7914-2844-3.
