= Bhasanyadam Union =

Union of Rangamati District, Chittagong, Bangladesh

Bhasanyadam ভাসান্যাদম
- Union
- Interactive map of Bhasanyadam
- Country: Bangladesh
- Division: Chittagong Division
- District: Rangamati District
- Upazila: Langadu Upazila

Area
  - Total: 72.52 km^{2} (28.00 sq mi)

Population (2022)
  - Total: 7,492
  - Density: 103.3/km^{2} (267.6/sq mi)
- Time zone: UTC+6 (BST)
- Postal code: 4580
- Website: vasannadamup.rangamati.gov.bd

Bhasanyadam Union is a union of Langadu Upazila under Rangamati District.

== Demography ==
According to 2022 census, total population of the Union are 7,492. Among them, 6,364 are Muslim, 1,063 are Buddhist, 64 are Hindu, 1 are Christian and 1 follow others religion.

Religion-2022
1. Islam (85.0%)
2. Buddhism (14.2%)
3. Hinduism (0.85%)
4. Christianity (0.00%)
5. Others (0.01%)

== Ethnicity ==
This Union is home to a variety of different ethnic groups. Among them, 6,582 are Bengali, 908 are Chakma and 2 are of others ethnic groups.

Ethnicity-2022
1. Bengali (87.8%)
2. Chakma (12.1%)
3. Others (0.03%)
