= Thích Huyền Quang =

- Title: Tăng thống (Patriarch)

Personal life
- Born: Lê Đình Nhàn; 19 September 1919 Bình Định Province, Vietnam, French Indochina
- Died: 5 July 2008 (aged 88) Hồ Chí Minh City, Socialist Republic of Vietnam

Religious life
- Religion: Buddhism
- Denomination: Thiền
- School: Lâm Tế (Linji Chan School)

Thích Huyền Quang (19 September 1919 – 5 July 2008) was a Vietnamese Buddhist monk, dissident and activist. At the time, he was the Patriarch of the Unified Buddhist Church of Vietnam, a currently banned organisation in his homeland. He was notable for his activism for human and religious rights in Vietnam.

In 1977, Quang wrote a letter to then-Prime Minister Phạm Văn Đồng detailing counts of oppression by the communist regime. For this, he and five other senior monks were arrested and detained. In 1982, he was arrested and put on permanent house arrest for opposition to governmental policy after publicly denouncing the establishment of the state-controlled Vietnam Buddhist Sangha.

In 2002, he was awarded the Homo Homini Award for his human rights activism by the Czech group People in Need, which he shared with Thích Quảng Độ and Father Nguyễn Văn Lý.

== Death ==
Quang died peacefully on Saturday, 5 July 2008, aged 88, at his monastery. His funeral was held on Friday, 11 July 2008, without incident.

Buddhist titles
Preceded by Thích Ðôn Hậu	Patriarch of the UBCV; 1992–2008	Succeeded by Thich Quảng Độ
