= Sauce poivrade =

Cooking sauce

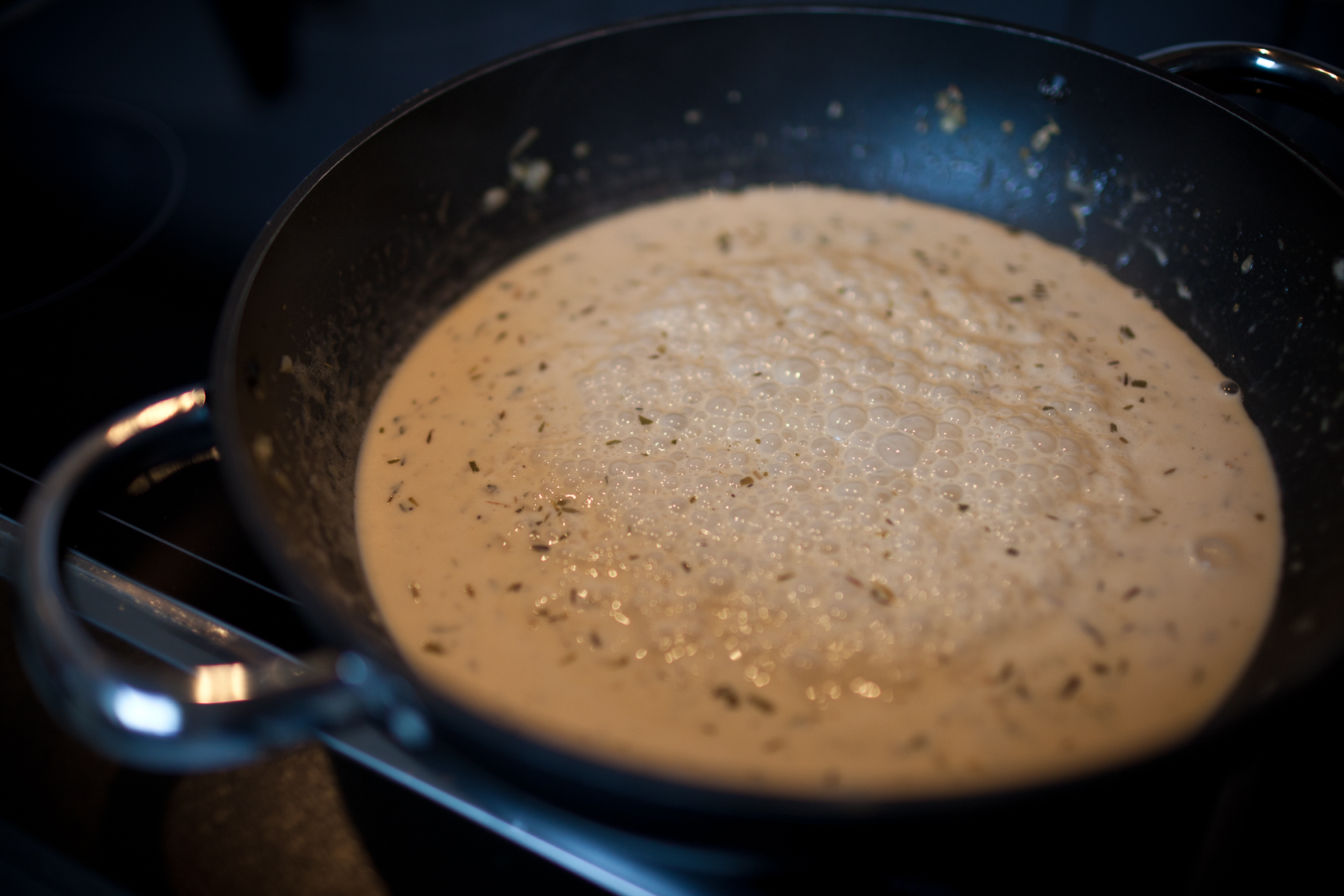
- Sauce poivrade being prepared
- Type: Sauce
- Place of origin: France
- Main ingredients: mirepoix; black pepper; Espagnole sauce or wine and vinegar

Sauce poivrade (French pronunciation: [sos pwavʁad]), sometimes called sauce au poivre, is a peppery sauce in French cuisine.

It is made of a cooked mirepoix thickened with flour and moistened with wine and a little vinegar, then heavily seasoned with black pepper. More traditional versions in French haute cuisine use sauce espagnole, one of the French mother sauces, as a thickener.

== See also ==
- List of sauces
- Peppercorn sauce
- Wine sauce
