= Thích Quảng Độ =

Vietnamese Buddhist monk and scholar (1928–2020)

- Title: Tăng Thống (Patriarch)

Personal life
- Born: Đặng Phúc Tuệ; 27 November 1928 Thành Châu, Thái Bình Province, French Indochina
- Died: 22 February 2020 (aged 91) Ho Chi Minh City, Vietnam

Religious life
- Religion: Buddhism
- School: Thiền
- Dharma name: Quảng Độ (廣度)

Senior posting
- Predecessor: Thích Huyền Quang

Thích Quảng Độ (chữ Hán: 釋廣度) ([Thích Quảng Độ]; 27 November 1928 – 22 February 2020) was a Vietnamese Buddhist monk and scholar who was the patriarch of the Unified Buddhist Church of Vietnam (UBCV) from 2008 until his death. Since the execution of his master at the hands of the communist Việt Minh in his teenage years, Thích Quảng Độ had been involved in political activism, firstly against the anti-Buddhist policies of the Catholic President of South Vietnam Ngô Đình Diệm.

After the fall of Saigon, the UBCV was banned by the communist government, and as one of the senior monks in the organisation, Thích Quảng Độ was at the forefront of the UBCV's defiance of the government, refusing to join the government-endorsed Vietnamese Buddhist Church. He was detained repeatedly by the communist authorities in the last 45 years of his life for his resistance and criticism of their policies, particularly his calls for multi-party democracy. During the Vietnam War period, he also served as a university academic in Buddhism, translated sutras and wrote books, notably a nine-volume Buddhist encyclopedia, and two-volume dictionary between Vietnamese and Sino-Vietnamese.

In 2002, Thích Quảng Độ was awarded the Homo Homini Award for human rights activism by the Czech group People In Need, which he shared with his predecessor as patriarch Thích Huyền Quang and Thadeus Nguyễn Văn Lý. He was also awarded the Thorolf Rafto Memorial Prize and was nominated for the Nobel Peace Prize.

== Life ==
Thích Quảng Độ was born Đặng Phúc Tuệ in Thanh Chau village in Thái Bình Province in northern Vietnam, and became a monk at age 14. During the Vietnamese famine of 1945, he walked for two days from Thanh Sam Temple, where he was training to his home village, where he carried his gravely-malnourished oldest brother from the home to the local temple and nursed him back to health. At age 17 he witnessed his religious master Thích Đức Hải executed by the revolutionary People's Tribunal. He quoted in open letter to Communist Party Secretary-General Đỗ Mười in 1994 that "Then and there I vowed to do all that I could to combat fanaticism and intolerance and devote my life to the pursuit of justice through the Buddhist teachings of non-violence."

In the 1950s, Thích Quảng Độ travelled to India, Sri Lanka and other parts of Asia to further his Buddhist training and serve as an academic at various universities, spending seven years abroad before returning to Saigon in South Vietnam to teach Buddhism. He was a professor at the Van Hanh Buddhist University and Saigon University among other institutions in the 1960s and 1970s. He translated various Buddhist texts into Vietnamese and wrote Buddhist textbooks, notably a two-volume Buddhist dictionary between Vietnamese and Sino-Vietnamese, and oversaw a nine-volume Vietnamese language Buddhist encyclopedia.

=== Political opposition ===
While a member of the leadership of the UBCV, Thích Quảng Độ became an activist, fighting against the anti-Buddhist policies of the Catholic President of South Vietnam Ngô Đình Diệm. After a military raid of Buddhist monasteries in Hue and Saigon, Thích Quảng Độ was arrested on 20 August 1963. He and thousands of other Buddhists endured torture and persecution while imprisoned by the Diem government. He was released after Diem regime was toppled in military coup in November 1963. As a result of imprisonment, Thích Quảng Độ struggled with tuberculosis before having a lung operation in Japan in 1966.

In 1965, Thích Quảng Độ was appointed as the Secretary-General of the Viện Hóa Đạo (Institute for the Dissemination of Dharma) of the UBCV.

In 1975 Vietnam was under communist control, and the UBCV was once again unwelcome in Vietnam. As a result, the UBCV facilities were seized, and documents burned. Thích Quảng Độ was active in protesting the government's actions, and after attempting to gather Buddhists from other regions in non-violent opposition, he was arrested on charges of 'anti-revolutionary activities' and 'undermining national solidarity'. He spent 20 months at the Phan Dang Luu Prison in solitary confinement in a cell approximately 2m^{2} in size with a hand-sized window, before he was tried and released in December 1978. Later that year he was nominated by Betty Williams and Mairead Maguire to receive the Nobel Peace Prize.

In 1982 the Vietnamese Government created a Buddhist alternative, called the Vietnam Buddhist Church, which was state sponsored and controlled by the Vietnam Fatherland Front. Because of Quảng Độ's opposition to the new church, he was again jailed. At one meeting of the Viện Hóa Đạo, he stated to the attendees that 'If you want to pursue glory, then go ahead, but this boat, regardless of whether it is disintegrating, broken or unsteady, let us look after it'. He rejected an approach from the Minister of Public Security Mai Chí Thọ to take up a leadership role in the government-backed Buddhist organisation. Quảng Độ would spend the next 10 years in exile in the village of Vu Doai in Thai Binh Province. His 84-year-old mother was expelled with him, who died in 1985 due to inadequate medical care and malnutrition. In 1992, he returned to the Thanh Minh Pagoda in Saigon.

Yet again in 1995, while attempting to send a fax to overseas Buddhists to expose government abuse by obstructing flood relief efforts, he was arrested and sentenced to five years in prison and a further five years of probation on the grounds of 'undermining the policy of unity and exploiting the rights of freedom to impede the interests of the state'. This led to condemnation by the likes of Nobel laureates the 14th Dalai Lama, José Ramos-Horta, Mairead Maguire and Francois Jacob, and the US Secretary of State Madeleine Albright. He was released in September 1998 in response to international pressure on the communist government, and returned to Thanh Minh Monastery. In October 2000, he led a delegation of monks to provide relief in An Giang Province in the Mekong Delta but they were detained by police, before being forced to return to Saigon after being accused of threatening national security.

Thích Quảng Độ became the President of the UBCV's Institute for the Dissemination of the Dharma in 1999, meaning that he was the second-ranking UBCV dignitary after patriarch Thich Huyen Quang.

In February 2001, just before the 9th Congress of the Vietnamese Communist Party, Thích Quảng Độ started a pro-democracy campaign as part of an eight-point program, including free elections as part of a multi-party democracy, trade union membership and 'the abolition of all degrading forms of imported culture and ideologies that pervert Vietnamese spiritual and moral values'. The communist government responded by detaining him, before releasing him in June 2003. In February, he published an open letter advocating multi-party democracy and civil rights. He further stated that they were “more important than economic development” and without them “we cannot make any progress in the real sense.” In a 2003 interview, he stated "People are very afraid of the government ... Only I dare to say what I want to say. That is why they are afraid of me". However, he was again detained in October 2003 after an unauthorised UBCV meeting. He was officially released in 2005, but a UN Working Group on Arbitrary Detention reported that he was still effectively under detention.

In 2008, as one of his last wishes, Patriarch Thich Huyen Quang named Thích Quảng Độ as the new patriarch of the Unified Buddhist Church of Vietnam, a position he would occupy until his death. Upon succeeding Thich Huyen Quang, Thích Quảng Độ stated that 'The best way to honour our late Patriarch is by putting his words into practice in our daily lives. The Supreme Bicameral Council pledges to do its utmost to re-establish the legal status of the UBCV and maintain its historic tradition of independence'.

After 20 years at Thanh Minh, where he remained under continuous surveillance, he returned north to Thai Binh, before returning to Saigon to stay at Tu Hieu Temple in November 2018. Saigon authorities continued to send police to the temple to harass Thích Quảng Độ and abbot Thích Nguyên Lý about the residency status of the former, and tried to restrict access by his disciples.

== Death ==
Thích Quảng Độ died on 22 February 2020 at age 91 at Từ Hiếu Temple in District 8, Ho Chi Minh City. In his later years, he had been afflicted by diabetes, high blood pressure and a heart condition, the last of which required an operation in 2003. Thích Quảng Độ asked for his ashes to be scattered at sea. The exiled Vietnamese dissident blogger Điếu Cày stated that his death was 'a great loss for the UBCV as well as the movement for freedom and democracy in Vietnam. The Most Venerable Thích Quảng Độ dedicated his entire life to struggling for religious freedom for Vietnam'. Điếu Cày described him as 'one of the main pillars of the UBCV, withstanding many oppressions and persecutions from the communist authorities but nevertheless remaining steadfast in maintaining the independence of the UBCV and not accepting the administration of the communist regime'. Thích Quảng Ba, the Vice Chairman of the UBCV in Australia and New Zealand, stated that Thích Quảng Độ's contributions extended beyond his work as a scholar and translator, and that his greatest legacy was his 'indomitable spirit', which made him the 'conscience' of the Vietnam people and 'shown the path to our generation'. The United States Commission on International Religious Freedom called his death 'an incredible loss for the people of Vietnam' and said that 'With his quiet strength and grace, he fought for decades to preserve and promote religious freedom in Vietnam'.

== Awards ==
In 2001, Thích Quảng Độ received the Hellman-Hammet Award from Human Rights Watch for persecuted writers.

In 2003, Thích Quảng Độ was honored with the Homo Homini Award for human rights activism by the Czech group People in Need, which he shared with Thích Huyền Quang and Father Nguyễn Văn Lý.

In 2006, Thích Quảng Độ was awarded the Thorolf Rafto Memorial Prize, in recognition of "personal courage and perseverance through three decades of peaceful opposition against the communist regime in Vietnam, and as a symbol for the growing democracy movement". Thích Quảng Độ was unable to the receive the award, as the government prevented him from attending the ceremony.

In 2006, Thích Quảng Độ was also awarded the Democracy Courage Tribute by the World Movement for Democracy.
