= Langadu Union =

Union of Rangamati District, Chittagong, Bangladesh

Langadu লংগদু
- Union
- Interactive map of Langadu
- Country: Bangladesh
- Division: Chittagong Division
- District: Rangamati District
- Upazila: Langadu Upazila

Area
  - Total: 145.04 km^{2} (56.00 sq mi)

Population (2022)
  - Total: 15,834
  - Density: 109.17/km^{2} (282.75/sq mi)
- Time zone: UTC+6 (BST)
- Postal code: 4580
- Website: langaduup.rangamati.gov.bd

Langadu Union is a union of Langadu Upazila under Rangamati District.

== Demography ==
According to 2022 census, total population of the Union are 15,834. Among them, 5,925 are Muslim, 9,682 are Buddhist, 214 are Hindu, 6 are Christian and 7 follow others religion.

Religion-2022
1. Buddhism (61.1%)
2. Islam (37.4%)
3. Hinduism (1.35%)
4. Christianity (0.04%)
5. Others (0.04%)

== Ethnicity ==
This Union is home to a variety of different ethnic groups. Among them, 6,226 are Bengali, 9,595 are Chakma and 13 are of others ethnic groups.

Ethnicity-2022
1. Chakma (60.6%)
2. Bengali (39.3%)
3. Others (0.08%)
