= Langadu Upazila =

Langadu লংগদু
- Upazila
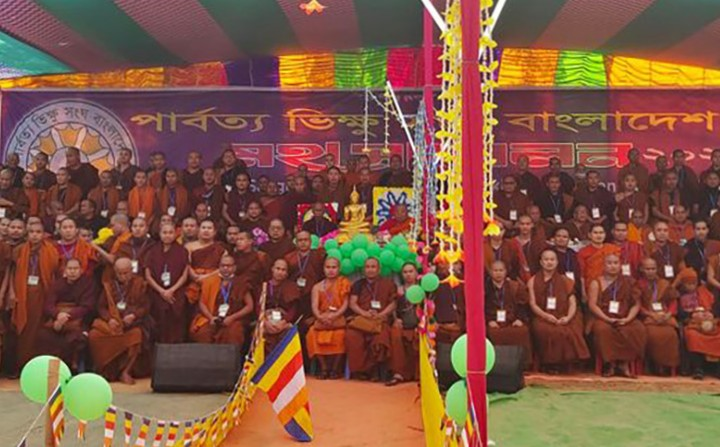
- Hill Tract Monks' Association of Bangladesh Council 2021 at RS High School Complex, Langadu Upazila

- Coordinates: 22°57′N 92°9′E
- Country: Bangladesh
- Division: Chittagong
- District: Rangamati

Area
  - Total: 388.49 km^{2} (150.00 sq mi)

Population (2022)
  - Total: 90,408
  - Density: 232.72/km^{2} (602.73/sq mi)
- Time zone: UTC+6 (BST)
- Postal code: 4580
- Website: Official Map of Langadu

Langadu Upazila mauza geocode map

Langadu (Bengali: লংগদু) is an upazila of Rangamati District in the Division of Chittagong, Bangladesh.

== Geography ==
Langadu is located at 22.9500°N 92.1500°E. It has a total area of 388.49 km^{2}.

== Demographics ==
According to the 2022 Bangladeshi census, Langadu Upazila had 20,823 households and a population of 90,408. 12.20% of the population were under 5 years of age. Langadu had a literacy rate (age 7 and over) of 70.63%: 74.71% for males and 66.43% for females, and a sex ratio of 103.03 males for every 100 females. 20,656 (22.85%) lived in urban areas.

=== Ethnicity and religion ===
Religions in Langadu Upazila (2022)
| Religion | Percent |
| Islam | 74.62% |
| Buddhism | 23.74% |
| Hinduism | 1.23% |
| Christianity | 0.40% |
| Other or not stated | 0.01% |

Population by religion in Union
| Union | Muslim | Buddhist | Others |
|---|---|---|---|
| Atarakchhara | 5,936 | 7,147 | 88 |
| Bagachatar | 12,833 | 1,610 | 200 |
| Bhasanyadam | 6,364 | 1,063 | 65 |
| Gulshakhali | 10,349 | 985 | 294 |
| Kalapakujya | 8,623 | 0 | 2 |
| Langadu | 5,925 | 9,682 | 237 |
| Mainimukh | 17,435 | 972 | 606 |

🟩 Muslim majority 🟨 Buddhist majority

As of the 2022 Bangladeshi census, Langadu upazila had a population of 90,408. The ethnic population was 21,248 (23.50%), of which Chakma were 20,888.

Ethnicity in the Langadu Upazila (2022)
1. Bengali (76.5%)
2. Chakma (23.1%)
3. Others (0.40%)

Population by ethnicity in Union
| Union | Bengali | Chakma | Others |
|---|---|---|---|
| Atarakchharaé | 5,995 | 7,148 | 28 |
| Bagachatar | 13,248 | 1,347 | 48 |
| Bhasanyadam | 6,582 | 908 | 2 |
| Gulshakhali | 10382 | 986 | 260 |
| Kalapakujya | 8625 | 0 | 0 |
| Langadu | 6,226 | 9,595 | 13 |
| Mainimukh | 18,100 | 904 | 9 |

🟩 Bengali majority 🟨 Chakma majority

== Administration ==
UNO: Mohammad Saiful Islam.

Langadu Upazila is divided into seven union parishads: Atarakchhara, Bagachatar, Gulshakhali, Kalapakujya, Langadu, Mainimukh, and Bhasanyadam. The union parishads are subdivided into 25 mauzas and 138 villages.

== Education ==
There are two colleges in the upazila: Langadu Government Model College and Gulshkhali Border Guard Model College.

According to Banglapedia, Gulshakhali Adarsha High School, Kattali High School, Langadu Girls' High School, Langadu Government High School, and Rabita Model High School are notable secondary schools.

== See also ==
- Upazilas of Bangladesh
- Districts of Bangladesh
- Divisions of Bangladesh
