= Bắc 54 =

Northern Vietnamese emigrants to southern Vietnam in 1954–55

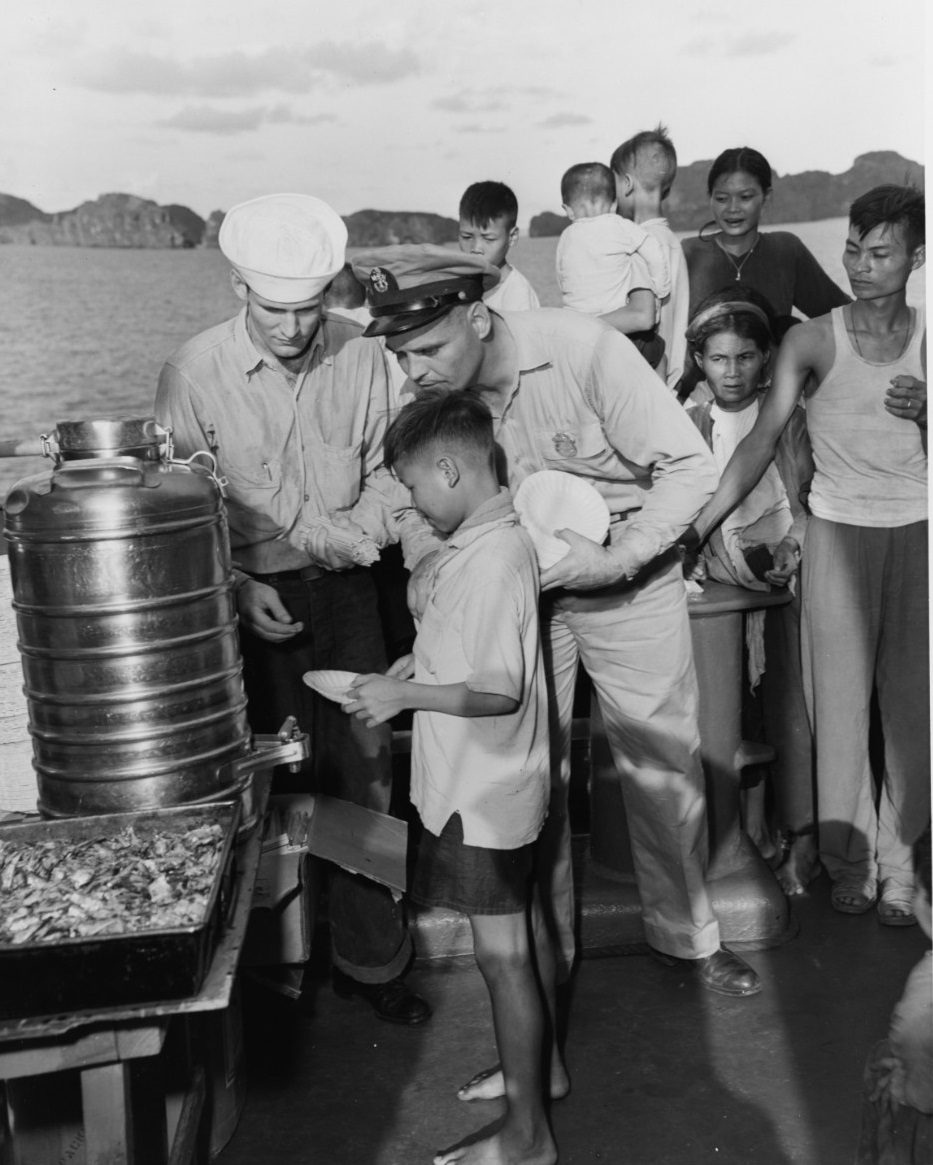
Refugees aboard the USS Montrose are shown the way of the U.S. Navy chow line while en route from Haiphong to Saigon,18 August 1954.

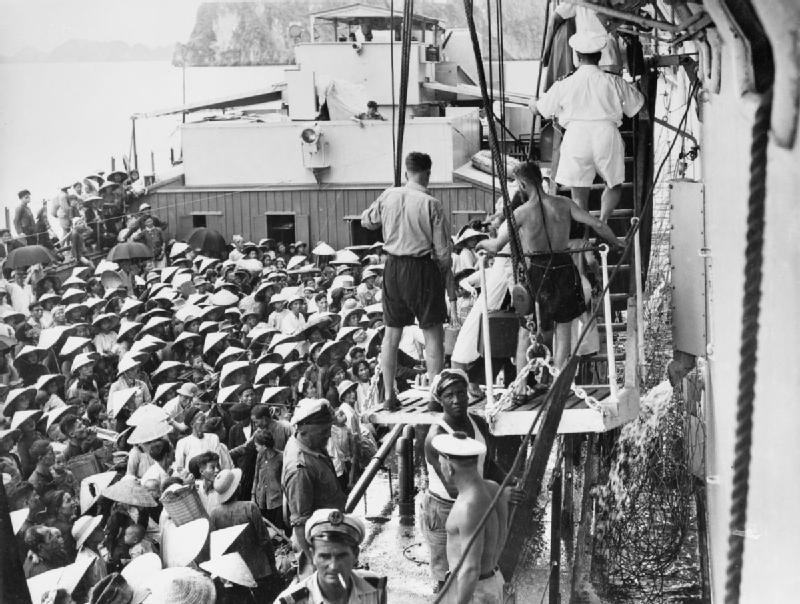
The HMS Warrior evacuates 1,455 refugees, 4 September 1954

Bắc 54, or Bắc Kỳ 54 (both meaning "Northerners of '54"), refers to people living in South Vietnam who migrated from North Vietnam in 1954 and early 1955, mostly through Operation Passage to Freedom.

== Operation Passage to Freedom ==
Operation Passage to Freedom was an initiative by the U.S. Navy and French military to transport Vietnamese civilians who wished to relocate to the Southern half of Vietnam from the North, mostly by ship or aircraft, as provided under the 1954 Geneva Accords, which created a 300-day period where people could migrate freely between communist North Vietnam and anti-communist South Vietnam before the border was sealed on May 18, 1955. Bắc 54 who fled South through Passage to Freedom number varied from 810,000 to almost 1 million (in 1955). An additional 109,000 fled south by their own means, some arriving outside the 300-day period (e.g. after the Quỳnh Lưu uprising). The people who fled on their own did so by trekking through Laos, boarding local fishing vessels after payment on spot, or journey overland if they were in Quảng Bình. The migrants were mainly political refugees who were escaping the impending rule of the North Vietnamese communist government, headed by Ho Chi Minh, that was to officially rule the entire Northern half in 1955, and to escape potential persecution by the new regime. However, there were also other reasons for why they left. Many Northern Catholics were among the migrants, forming around three-quarters of the refugees. More than 200,000 Buddhists migrated to the South along with their main leaders. An entire Buddhist intellectual movement relocated to the South.

The vast majority originated from the Red River Delta region, particularly Hanoi, Hải Phòng, Ninh Bình, and Nam Định; few of the emigres came from the provinces of the rural North-Central provinces of Thanh Hoá, Nghệ An, Hà Tĩnh and Quảng Bình. Tens of thousands of people from ethnic minority communities also moved to the South. The Viet Minh sought to detain or prevent refugees from leaving, by trying to stop people through a military presence in the rural side and inland areas or terminating ferries in the Red River Delta, interdicting the flow of would-be refugees, many of whom were aiming to reach ships and ferries in Hải Phòng or Hà Nội, as the American and French military personnel engaged in the refugee operation were only present in the major cities, air bases and on the waterfront. The communists were most effective in Nghệ An and Thanh Hóa Provinces, which they had long controlled.

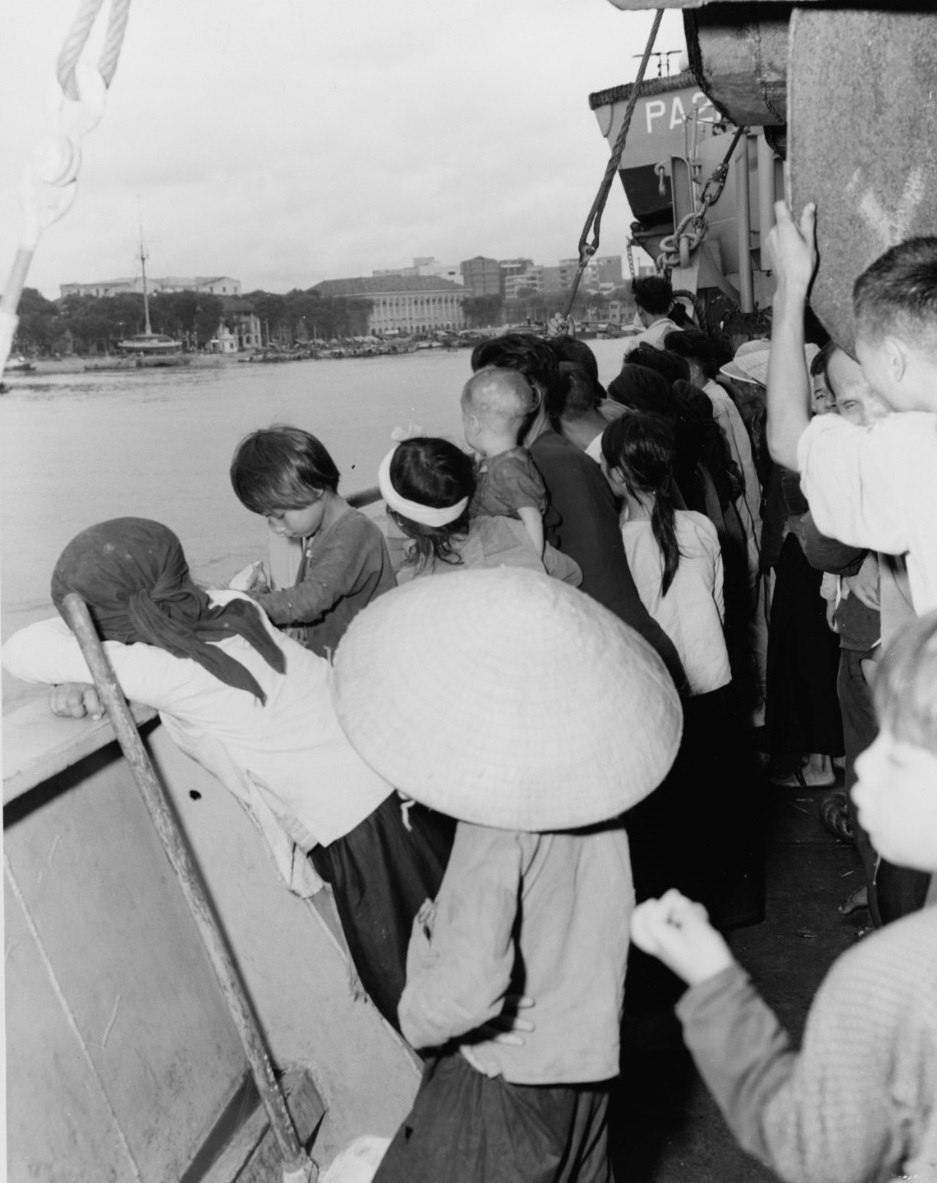
Vietnamese refugees on board USS Mountrail as they arrive at Saigon, South Vietnam, after a 2 1/2-day trip from Haiphong, September 1954

== Locations ==
Many of the Bắc 54 later settled in the coastal provinces of Bà Rịa–Vũng Tàu and Bình Thuận (where many continued fishing as they did in the North), Đồng Nai Province (where many continued in agriculture), or in the cities of Saigon and Biên Hòa. Biên Hòa would later be the site of a small-scale resistance to the new Communist government in the months immediately following the fall of South Vietnam in 1975, because of its high concentration of anti-communist former refugees and their descendants who had fled the Communist government of North Vietnam in 1954-1955.
