= One World Film Festival =

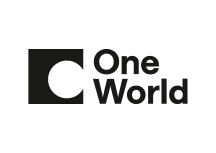
- Location: Prague and other cities in the Czech Republic
- Founded: 1999
- Founded by: People in Need
- Awards: Best Film Award
- Website: http://www.oneworld.cz/

One World (Czech: Jeden svět) is a human rights film festival (125,947 spectators in 2018), held annually in Prague and other 36 cities of the Czech Republic, with a selection later shown in Brussels and other countries. The festival highlights quality documentary films on social, political, environmental, media and human rights issues. One World presents over 100 documentary films from all around the globe and organizes numerous Q&As with filmmakers and experts.

== History ==
Established in 1999 by Igor Blaževič and the Czech NGO People in Need, the One World Festival presents over a100 documentary films during nine days in Spring from around the world. It is a founding member of the Human Rights Film Network, which brings together 33 festivals around the world.

In 2006, the festival received a Special Mention from UNESCO for its contribution to human rights and peace education. Three years later, in 2009, One World published a handbook entitled Setting Up a Human Rights Film Festival, which offers practical advice as well as case studies of prominent human rights events.

In 2018, the One World Festival was in its 20th year and took place from 5–14 March, presenting 128 documentaries and 9 virtual reality projects from more than 40 countries around the world. In the same year, the festival and the NGO, People In Need, published the handbook, Explore Impact: How To Reach New Audiences And Boost impact, that should serve as an important guideline for the festival (or other cultural events) organizers who care about the social dimension and impact of their work.

One World was held under the auspices of Václav Havel, the Minister of Foreign Affairs Karel Schwarzenberg, the Minister of Culture Jiří Besser, and the Mayor of Prague Bohuslav Svoboda.

The 2020 edition of the festival was postponed due to rising concerns over COVID-19 coronavirus outbreak.

== Competitions and awards ==
One World's program consists of three competitive categories, a variety of non-competitive thematic categories as well as Docs for Kids section. Films are judged by One World's selection committee that concentrates equally on both human rights content and artistic quality. Six main awards are given to the winning films:

- International Competition Award
- Award for the Best Director in the International Competition
- The Václav Havel Jury Award for a film that makes an exceptional contribution to the defense of human rights
- Czech Competition Award
- Audience Award
- Student Jury Award

== Homo Homini Award ==
During the festival, People in Need grants the annual Homo Homini Award to individuals in recognition of their dedication to promoting human rights, democracy and nonviolent solutions to political conflicts. The 2011 award went to the underground network of Syrian doctors, Doctors Coordinate of Damascus, for their work in aiding victims of violence in Syria.

Winners of the Homo Homini Award

- 1994: Sergei Kovalev
- 1997: Szeto Wah
- 1998: Ibrahim Rugova
- 1999: Oswaldo Payá Sardiñas
- 2000: Min Ko Naing
- 2001: Zackie Achmat
- 2002: Thích Huyền Quang, Thích Quảng Độ and Nguyễn Văn Lý
- 2003: Nataša Kandić
- 2004: Gheorghe Briceag
- 2005: Ales Bialatski and the Belarusian organisation Viasna
- 2006: Svetlana Gannushkina
- 2007: Su Su Nway, Phyu Phyu Thin, and Nilar Thein
- 2008: Liu Xiaobo
- 2009: Majid Tavakoli and Abdollah Momeni
- 2010: Azimjan Askarov
- 2011: Doctors Coordinate of Damascus
- 2012: Intigam Aliyev
- 2013: Sapiyat Magomedova
- 2014: Souad Nawfal
- 2015: Black Spring (Cuba): Martha Beatriz Roque Cabello, Jorge Olivera Castillo, Ángel Juan Moya Acosta, José Daniel Ferrer García, Félix Navarro Rodríguez, Iván Hernández Carrillo, Héctor Maseda Gutiérrez, Óscar Elías Biscet González, Eduardo Díaz Fleitas, Librado Ricardo Linares García, Arnaldo Ramos Lauzurique
- 2016: Committee for the Prevention of Torture (Russia)
- 2017: Pham Doan Trang
- 2018: Francisca Ramirez
- 2019: Buzurgmehr Yorov
- 2020: Marfa Rabkova, Andrei Chapiuk, Leanid Sudalenka, and Tatsiana Lasitsa
- 2021: Mahienour El-Massry

== See also ==
- Designblok
- List of film festivals in the Czech Republic
