= People in Need =

Czech humanitarian charity

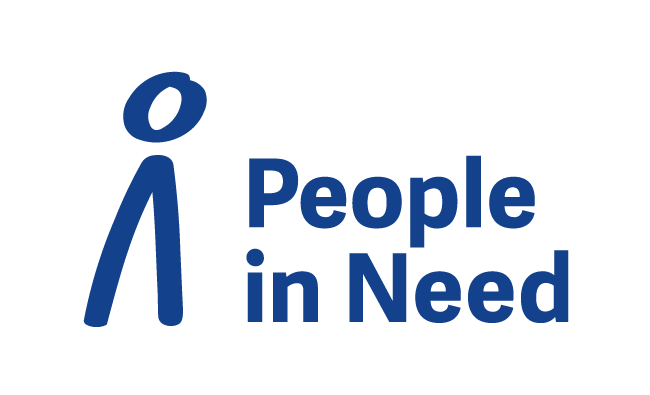
- Formation: 1992
- Type: Non-profit; NGO
- Headquarters: Prague, Czech Republic
- CEO: Šimon Pánek
- Board of directors: Jan Pergler (Chairperson)
- Website: peopleinneed.net

People in Need (PIN; Czech: Člověk v tísni) is a Czech nonprofit, non-governmental organisation based in Prague, Czech Republic. PIN implements humanitarian relief and long term development projects, educational programmes, and human rights programmes in crisis affected regions internationally. Its director is Šimon Pánek. As of 2022, PIN operates in 33+ countries.

In the Czech Republic, PIN runs social integration programmes and provides informative and educational activities. The organisation aims to promote democratic freedom and principles of human solidarity. Since its foundation in 1992, PIN has had a presence in almost 50 countries. Currently, PIN is one of the largest NGOs in Central and Eastern Europe.

People in Need is a member of Alliance 2015, Czech Forum for Development Cooperation (FoRS), EU Monitoring Centre (EUMC), Eurostep, CONCORD and VOICE. The vast majority of revenue comes from individual projects. Among its donors are the Czech government, the Humanitarian Aid department of the European Commission, EuropeAid, the United States Agency for International Development, UN agencies, and the people of the Czech Republic.

== History ==
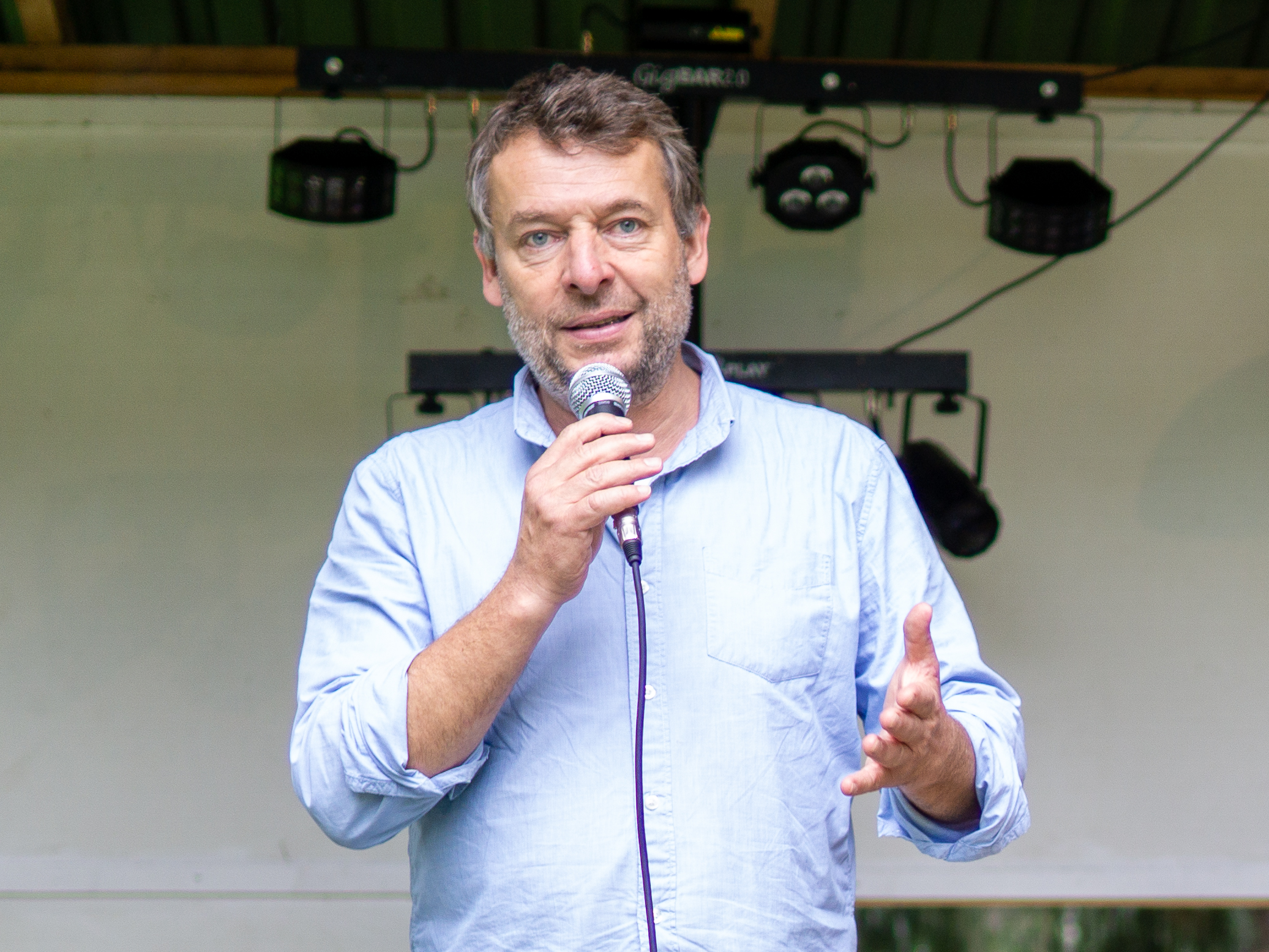
Šimon Pánek in 2022

People in Need was founded in 1992 by Šimon Pánek, a leading student activist during the Velvet Revolution, and by Jaromír Štětina, a war correspondent who focussed on conflict in the former Soviet Union. PIN began its work as Nadace Lidových novin (The Lidové noviny Foundation, in English Popular Newspapers) and changed its name two years later to Nadace Člověk v tísni při České televizi (The People in Need Foundation under the auspices of Czech Television). In 1999 PIN was given its current name, People in Need. Šimon Pánek has been the director of PIN since 2009. In order to deliver relief aid and development assistance, PIN works to create a tolerant, open society and mobilises public support. PIN's work is most visible during large humanitarian crisis such as the floods in the Czech Republic in 2002, the 2004 Indian Ocean earthquake (Czech people and companies donated more than 130 million CZK) or the 2010 Haiti earthquake.

In Africa and Asia, PIN implements development projects that provide basic human needs and education. In several countries like Belarus, Cuba, Moldova, and Ukraine, PIN has supported individuals and groups who advocate for democratic liberty. In the Czech Republic PIN concentrates on issues such as the assistance of local Romani living on the peripheries of society, the organisation of cultural activities (the most prominent is the One World Film Festival founded by Igor Blaževič), the distribution of information projects and involvement in political activism.

PIN has established major projects in Afghanistan (irrigation, local schools), Sri Lanka (since the 2004 earthquake), Pakistan (reconstruction after the 2005 earthquake in Pakistani part of Kashmir), Angola and Ethiopia (construction of schools), Namibia (help for people suffering HIV/AIDS), Romania and Serbia (endorse groups of ethnic Czechs settled there for generations) and several other countries.

In 2008, missions were implemented by PIN in Myanmar (relief and recovery operations after Cyclone Nargis) and the DR Congo (support for victims of rape and sexual violence). In 2009 the PIN provided assistance to people in Czech Republic after a series of devastating floods.

People in Need has operated in Venezuela since 2014 and has been trying to motivate people active in society to remain in the country and continue in their work despite the difficult conditions. PIN provides small grants to a number of other NGOs and individuals to support their activities. The focus of the projects varies from support of activists operating in deprived areas to support of lawyers defending imprisoned activists.

== Programmes and projects ==
=== Humanitarian and development aid ===
People in Need provides humanitarian aid to people affected by war or natural disasters. In recent years PIN has been providing aid to civilians caught up in the armed conflict in the East of Ukraine and the civil war in Syria. PIN provides food, shelter, water, and crisis psychosocial help the vulnerable people in these countries, whilst also helping to repair damaged homes and provide material and equipment for the winter. They also focus on food distribution, restoration of livelihoods, housing provision: ensuring that at least one warm room in a house, home repair, rent grants, and distribution of fuel and water. In Syria, People in Need also provides local farmers with seeds and tools to support their farming activity or, in safer places, provide food vouchers instead of food packages.

PIN has provided assistance to people in more than 50 countries across Europe, Asia and Africa, including DR Congo, Ethiopia, Angola, Mongolia, Cambodia and Romania. PIN works to address long-term problems such as the lack of quality education, health care and environmental degradation. Focusing on securing basic living needs (water, health, education, nutrition) and promoting social programmes, local business development, and supporting civil society and good governance. In Afghanistan, PIN began operating in 2001 after the fall of the Taliban, focusing on addressing long-term problems of livelihood, education and local community development.

=== Ukraine war ===
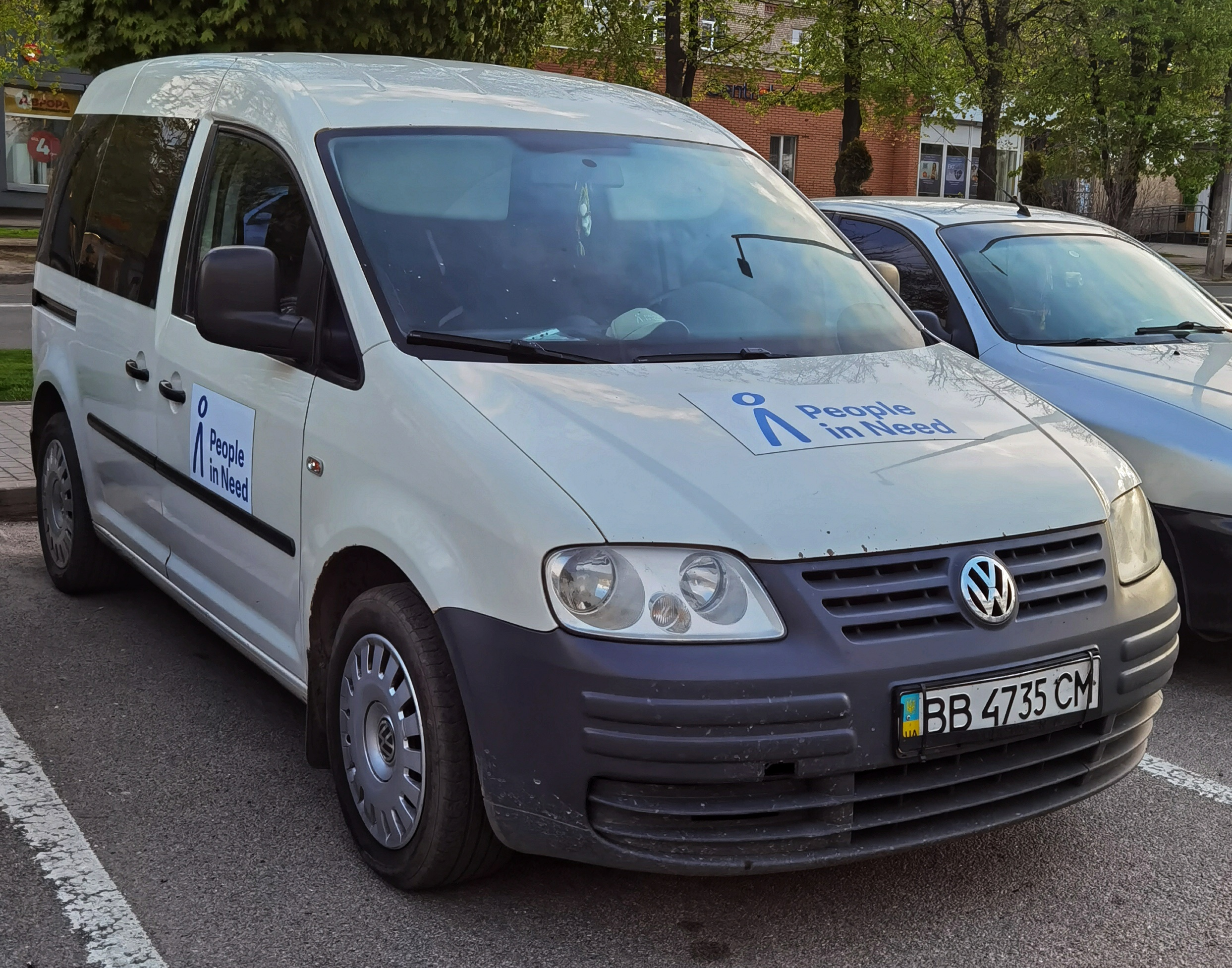
People in Need car in Dnipro, Ukraine, during war.

The Russian invasion of Ukraine in February 2022 has plunged millions of Ukrainians into a humanitarian crisis. The cities of Kyiv, Kharkiv, Kherson and Mariupol have been hit by intense fighting. Fighting has also taken place in the Donetsk and Luhansk Oblasts. People in Need — which has been working in Ukraine since 2003 — immediately organised humanitarian aid for the areas affected by the attacks on the first day of the armed conflict. The SOS Ukraine Emergency Appeal was set up and quickly became the most successful fundraising effort in the organisation's history. In cooperation with various partners, a train bridge between Ukraine and Prague was set up to help with the logistics and coordination of humanitarian aid. In the very first days of the war, PIN trucks loaded with humanitarian aid were dispatched to the war-affected areas of Ukraine.

The war in Ukraine affected millions of people. Residents of Ukraine were forced to move from their homes, and many residential areas of Ukrainian cities were destroyed. As a result of the fighting, critical infrastructure was damaged and hundreds of thousands of people found themselves without water and electricity. As a result, People in Need secured water supplies in eastern Ukraine. PIN has also financially supported local NGO partners to facilitate better distribute of food, drinking water and hygiene products.

Millions of people fled Ukraine to the neighboring countries. Most of those who fled were women and children. To improve their plight People in Need operated on the border of Ukraine and Poland, where people were waiting for days to get to safety. Help was offered to refugees in Czech Republic, and also in Moldova, Romania and Slovakia. People in Need also ensured shelter for refugees on the Ukrainian border. PIN built heated tents and offered important information to Ukrainians in flight.

In response to the unfolding humanitarian crisis People in Need launched a website Pomáhej Ukrajině (Help Ukraine) with the intention of pairing offer with demand in cooperation with non-government organisations working with migrants.

=== Social integration Programme ===
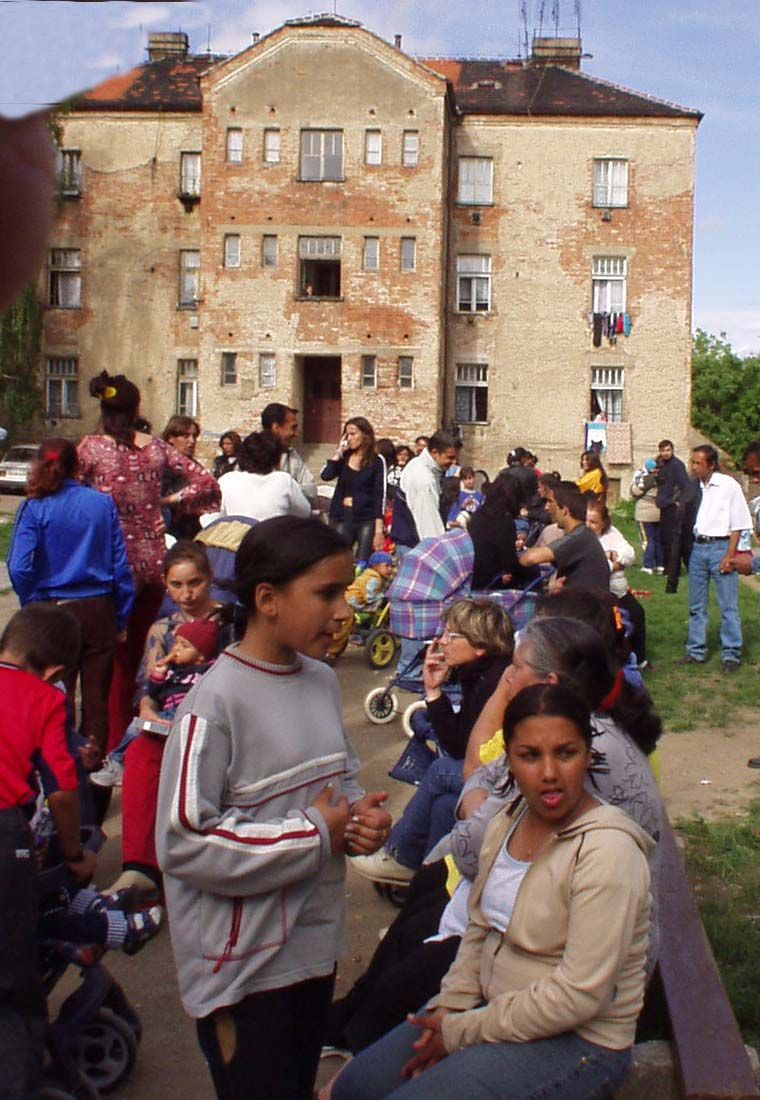
Social integration Programme in the Czech Republic

Since 1999, PIN has regularly worked to reduce poverty and social exclusion in the Czech Republic. It helps in poorer areas by providing social outreach projects, namely housing advice, advisory service for debtors, and limiting unemployment. In the past years, PIN has offered jobs, legal counseling, tutoring, social service assistance, police apparatus, and encouraged meaningful leisurely activities for children.

In summer 2006 PIN established a separate social integration department (in Czech: Programů sociální integrace, PSI). This department provides a comprehensive range of services for socially excluded individuals and families. Additionally, PIN advises town councils and municipalities with the highest numbers of socially excluded people. Their approach attempts to address the issues on both individual and community levels.

The programme employs over 200 people, including 130 social workers, job counselors, lawyers, and educators who are further supported by over 300 volunteers. It operates in more than 60 cities and municipalities throughout the Czech Republic and Slovakia.

Social exclusion is closely linked to problems with debt and the debt trap, which is associated with illegal loan-sharks and so-called quick loans offered by non-banking companies and even legitimate banking establishments. Hence, People in Need began negotiations with the Czech Banking Association in 2010, and reached an agreement regarding the elimination of unfair terms for credit agreements at all Czech banks. In 2011, PIN completed a nearly three-year campaign of indexing predatory lending to the Roma in Slovakia. Thanks to this campaign, the vast majority of companies modified the provision of loans.

=== Promotion of human rights ===
The Center for Human Rights and Democracy (HRD), a department within PIN, works abroad and mainly supports people and groups who face persecution, bullying, or imprisonment for their views or activities, usually independent of state power, in countries with repressive regimes.

PIN has been working in the field of human rights since the late 1990s. Their primary focus is the support of political prisoners (and their families) and civil society initiatives. Families of political prisoners, from harshly repressive regimes such as Myanmar and Cuba, are provided with financial and humanitarian assistance as well as moral support. The assistance covers a number of countries and areas where the situation is constantly poor or deteriorating. It provides direct financial, humanitarian and moral support to the families of political prisoners in harshly repressive regimes, which is largely funded by the Friends of People in Need Club. The organization is involved in various activities aimed at raising awareness of human rights violations around the world and finding broader public and political support for their protection.

Thus, HRD works in several dictatorships and many countries globally. A major part of PIN's work is advocacy for dissidents, opposition activists, and the development of a civil society in countries controlled by authoritarian regimes. In regards to its experience with communist and former communist regimes, HRD has programs in Eastern Europe (Armenia, Azerbaijan, Belarus, Moldova-Transnistria, and Ukraine), Latin America (Cuba, Venezuela, Ecuador, Honduras, and Nicaragua), Egypt, Libya, and Vietnam. PIN also have involvement in other parts of Asia. For example, Myanmar continues to be a country of concern and PIN has supported groups advocating for a civil society there since 1997.

In November 2019, the Russian Ministry of Justice included People in Need on the list of organizations that are undesirable in Russia. The Minister of Foreign Affairs of the Czech Republic Tomáš Petříček commented on this step, saying that he considered it absurd and demanded an explanation. He also said that the ban on human rights in Russia was a sign of the country's poor human rights record.

=== Education and outreach ===
Educational programmes focus on students and teachers in Czech primary and secondary schools, universities, and other professional groups (such as employees at employment centers or the police). Educational programmes are implemented via presentation of documentary films accompanied by topical discussions (e.g. One World at schools), an information service about intercultural education and global development (variations programme) for teachers, as well as the promotion of ties between institutions and NGOs working in the field of social exclusion (Social Integration Programme).

People in Need focuses on providing appropriate information to the Czech public, the government and the media. Long and short-term campaigns are implemented in film screenings, discursive evenings, creative competitions, and trips for journalists who address specific issues such as development cooperation (Rozvojovka, Stop child labor). Campaigns include public actions and projects involving the gathering of information and materials on migration and foreigners living in the Czech Republic.

PIN publishes what calls the 'Predator Index', a ranking of companies that provide unguaranteed loans, with inappropriate terms and conditions for the debtor. The index is compiled on the basis of the clarity of contract and conditions, the presence of default interest in excess of statutory regulations, the cost of a delayed payment in the form of penalties, the cost of the loan in the case of timely payment and the proper use of the arbitration clause.

One World Film Festival

Every year, People in Need organizes the largest human rights film festival in Europe, held in Prague, Czech Republic, called One World (Czech: Jeden Svět), which received honorable reference for its work on education of human rights by UNESCO in 2007. It is the largest documentary film festival on human rights in the world - over one hundred films from around the world are featured. The festival works with a broad definition of human rights, so the program includes films not only on political and developmental issues, but also on environmental and social issues. The films are featured in Prague in March, followed by more than thirty cities throughout the country and in Brussels. The most successful documentaries are featured on the website Promítej i ty! where they can be viewed for free.

The festival also hosts discussions every evening with directors, human rights activists, and other experts at the Municipal Library in Prague. People in Need further presents the Homo Homini Award to a person who conduced a significant contribution towards the protection of human rights and non-violent promotion of democracy. The Homo Homini Award was initially awarded as a once-off award in 1994, however, since 1997 it has been awarded annually.

The One World festival was disrupted by the COVID-19 pandemic in 2020. Almost 200 screenings had to be canceled and were moved to the DAFilms.cz online cinema.

==== Winners of the Homo Homini Award ====
Past winners of the award include the following:

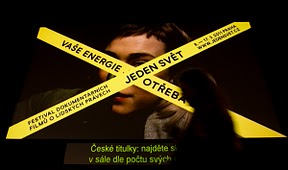
One World Festival/Jeden Svět 2011

- 1994: Sergei Kovalev
- 1997: Szeto Wah
- 1998: Ibrahim Rugova
- 1999: Oswaldo Payá Sardiñas
- 2000: Min Ko Naing
- 2001: Zackie Achmat
- 2002: Thích Huyền Quang, Thích Quảng Độ and Nguyen Van Ly
- 2003: Nataša Kandić
- 2004: Gheorghe Briceag
- 2005: Ales Bialatski and the Belarusian organisation Viasna
- 2006: Svetlana Gannushkina
- 2007: Su Su Nway, Phyu Phyu Thin, and Nilar Thein
- 2008: Liu Xiaobo
- 2009: Majid Tavakoli and Abdollah Momeni
- 2010: Azimzhan Askarov
- 2011: Doctors Coordinate of Damascus
- 2012: Intiqam Aliyev
- 2013: Sapiyat Magomedova
- 2014: Su’ad Nawfal
- 2015: Black Spring (Cuba): Martha Beatriz Roque Cabello, Jorge Olivera Castillo, Ángel Juan Moya Acosta, José Daniel Ferrer García, Félix Navarro Rodríguez, Iván Hernández Carrillo, Héctor Maseda Gutiérrez, Óscar Elías Biscet González, Eduardo Díaz Fleitas, Librado Ricardo Linares García, Arnaldo Ramos Lauzurique
- 2016: Committee for the Prevention of Torture (Russia)
- 2017: Pham Doan Trang
- 2018: Francisca Ramírez
- 2019: Buzurgmehr Yorov
- 2020: Marfa Rabkova, Andrei Chapiuk, Leanid Sudalenka, and Tatsiana Lasitsa
- 2021: Mahienour El-Massry An Egyptian humanitarian lawyer who, amongst other things, has supported and defended political prisoners in Egypt, even when she was imprisoned herself.
- 2024: Abzas Media

== Criticism ==
Russian criticism, Chechnya and Ingushetia Since the end of the 1990s, People in Need maintained several projects in Chechnya and Ingushetia. In 2005, the Russian Weekly Argumenty i Fakty named PIN – and other NGOs and the UN – supporters of Chechen separatists and terrorists. PIN denied any involvement. In the same year Russia banned PIN from working in the region. Two years later, in 2007, People in Need was allowed to come back and keep working in Chechnya and Ingushetia.

Cuban criticism, ECOSOC During a meeting of ECOSOC in 2006, the Cuban ambassador accused PIN of being financed by the US and conspiring against the government of Cuba and keeping in contact with Cuban emigrants who have a so-called terrorist past. After the vote, PIN was not recommended for consultative status with the ECOSOC.

Kosovo, South Ossetia PIN was moreover criticised by some Czech journalists for expressing too much political concern: after the Kosovo war, for a perception that PIN supported Kosovar Albanians, but not the local Serbs. Similarly, after the South Ossetia war in 2008, PIN was criticised as relief was delivered only to Georgian civilians.

Donetsk In November 2016 the breakaway region of Ukraine the Donetsk People's Republic expelled PIN from the territory it claimed, with DPR officials claiming that PIN was "carrying out provocative activity, corruption schemes and sneering attitude to the people of the DPR". PIN denied any wrongdoing.

== See also ==
- One World Film Festival
