= Homo Homini Award =

The Homo Homini Award (Latin: "A human to another human") is given annually by the Czech human rights organization People in Need to "an individual in recognition of a dedication to the promotion of human rights, democracy and non-violent solutions to political conflicts". The award is presented at the One World Film Festival, the world's largest human rights film festival.

== Winners of the Homo Homini Award ==
Past winners of the Homo Homini Award include the following:

- 1994: Sergei Kovalev
- 1997: Szeto Wah
- 1998: Ibrahim Rugova
- 1999: Oswaldo Payá Sardiñas
- 2000: Min Ko Naing
- 2001: Zackie Achmat
- 2002: Thích Huyền Quang, Thích Quảng Độ and Thadeus Nguyễn Văn Lý
- 2003: Nataša Kandić
- 2004: Gheorghe Briceag
- 2005: Ales Bialatski and the Belarusian organisation Viasna
- 2006: Svetlana Gannushkina
- 2007: Su Su Nway, Phyu Phyu Thin, and Nilar Thein
- 2008: Liu Xiaobo, and symbolically to all of the signatories of Charter 08
- 2009: Majid Tavakoli and Abdollah Momeni
- 2010: Azimzhan Askarov
- 2011: Doctors Coordinate of Damascus
- 2012: Intiqam Aliyev
- 2013: Sapijat Magomedova
- 2014: Souad Nawfal
- 2015: Eleven dissidents from the formerly imprisoned 75 Cuban dissidents, who refused to leave the country to fight for democracy
- 2016: Committee for the Prevention of Torture (Russia)
- 2017: Phạm Đoan Trang
- 2018: Francisca Ramírez
- 2019: Buzurgmehr Yorov
- 2020: Marfa Rabkova, Andrei Chapiuk, Leanid Sudalenka, Tatsiana Lasitsa of the Viasna Human Rights Centre
- 2021: Mahienour El-Massry
- 2022: Javier Tarazona, venezuelan activist
- 2023: Abzas Media
- 2024: Philip Obaji, and Victoria Roshchyna
- 2025: Mikola Statkevich
