= Igor Blaževič =

Bosnian humanitarian

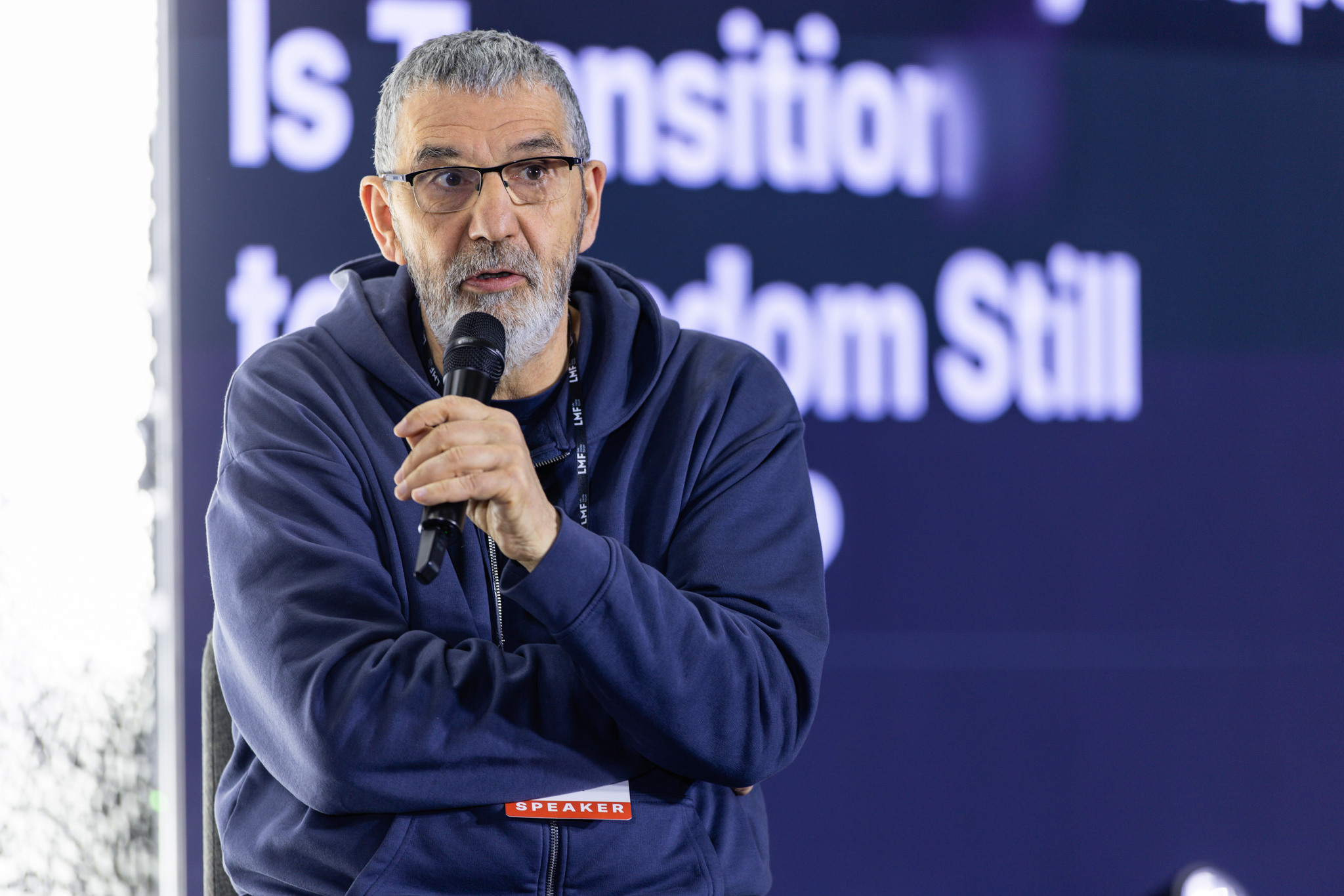
Igor Blaževič in 2026

Igor Blaževič (born 1963 in Trebinje, Herzegovina region of SFR Yugoslavia) is a European human rights campaigner of Bosnian origin living in the Czech Republic as the founder and longtime director of One World, the Europe's biggest human rights documentary International Film Festival and the director of the People in Need foundation. He is also the member of the steering committee of World Movement for Democracy. Currently he is a Programme Director at the Prague Civil Society Centre. Among other activities he is the director of the Educational Initiatives, training program for the Burma activists based in Thailand.

== Life ==
He studied philosophy and comparative literature at the University of Zagreb. Since 1992, he worked in the International Secretariat of the Helsinki Citizens Assembly and since 1994 worked in the organization People in Need.

Since 1999 he was the director of the film festival One World and one of the persons nominating the Homo Homini International Award given by People in Need to personalities promoting human rights.

Igor Blaževič is married to Jasmina Blažević, a filmmaker.

== Humanitarian Missions - from Chechnya to East Timor ==
He participated in many humanitarian missions such as Sarajevo, Chechnya, Cambodia or Burma and East Timor. He also took part in filming a wide range of documentaries, such as Issues from Asia (1998), City of Shadows (1999), The Refugees of Twenty Years War (2000), Small Dreams of the Street, Only 500 Deaths (2002, from East Timor), Burmese Prisoners (2002) (translated names).

== Awards ==
For his activities in favour of human rights he received the Alice Garrigue Masaryk Award, František Kriegel Price and Prix Irene.
