= Briceag =

Briceag is a Romanian and Moldovan surname. Notable people with the surname include:

- Gheorghe Briceag (1928–2008), Moldovan human rights activist
- Marius Briceag (born 1992), Romanian footballer
