= Souad Nawfal =

Syrian activist

Souad Nawfal (also Suad Nofal; Arabic: سعاد نوفل) is a Syrian Muslim schoolteacher and activist who became known for her protests against Bashar al-Assad and the Islamic State (ISIS) in Syria. She received the Homo Homini Award, a human rights award, in 2014.

She studied education and earned a degree in 2006. She participated in the uprising against the regime of Bashar Al-Assad in March 2011 or March 2012, the latter date shortly after the death of Ali Babinsky, who was the first to be killed by the regime in the eastern provinces.

When ISIS kidnapped one of her friends, Jesuit priest Father Paolo Dall'Oglio, who had been in Syria since the 1970s and had recently been working to get those kidnapped by ISIS released, Nawfal went to ISIS headquarters in Raqqa, beginning a practice of daily protest. Other sources state that her protest began as a more general anti-ISIS protest, or because she wanted to wear pants. She made and held signs she had written specifically to shame the organization, including statements such as “Our revolution was begun by honorable people and is being stolen by thieves!” and “Muslims spilling the blood of Muslims are sinners!” She disagrees with the Islamic teachings of ISIS, and uses her own identity as a Muslim woman to challenge them in these specifically Islamic terms. Her protests also supported Christians in Syria. She has been harassed, beaten, and shot at while protesting. While protesting, she often wore outfits that included trousers and hijab, while ISIS mandated niqāb for women. She also made a series of videos, though it was illegal for citizens to film or take photographs on the streets. One of her most famous videos is titled "The Woman in Pants."

Nawfal also worked in relief efforts, including selling handicrafts to raise money for displaced persons. She started the Jana Foundation, a small non-governmental organization, to support women and families with income and food after and during the ISIS occupation of Raqqa.

She was protesting on September 25, 2013, when she was again shot at and sentenced to death on the orders of the emir. She escaped from Raqqa to Urfa, Turkey in October or December 2013. She later was able to emigrate to Europe.

In 2014, Nawfal received the Homo Homini Award from the Czech nongovernmental organization People in Need for her efforts in fighting for human rights. She received the award during the 2015 One World documentary film festival in Prague. In her acceptance speech, she stressed that Syrian President Bashar al-Assad bears responsibility for the terrorism throughout Syria.
