= Šimon Pánek =

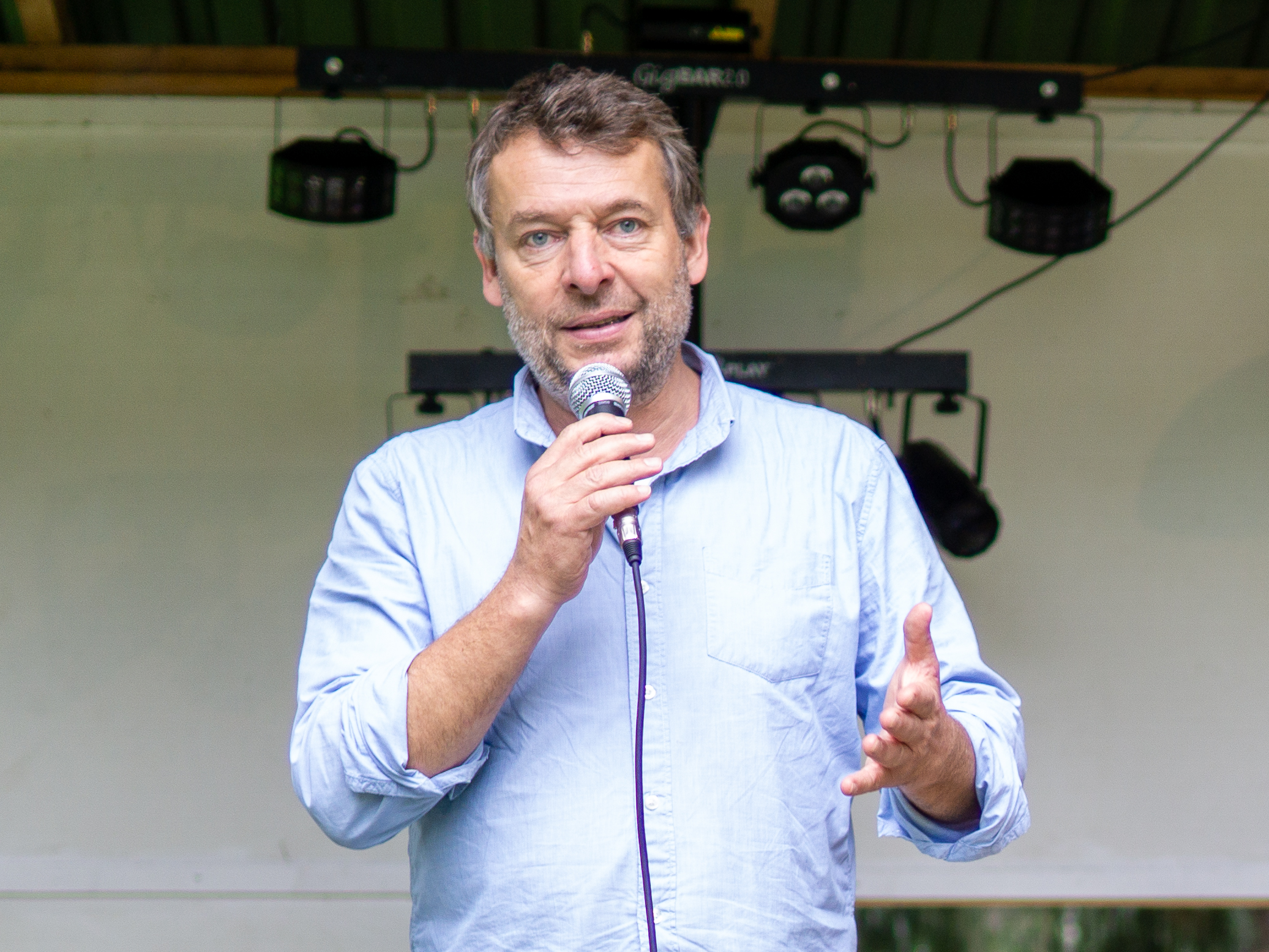
- Born: 27 December 1967 (age 58)
- Occupation: Executive director of People in Need

Šimon Pánek (born 27 December 1967) is a Czech NGO director and former student activist. He is the executive director of the humanitarian organisation People in Need (Člověk v tísni), which he co-founded in 1992. He also became known for his activities as a student leader in 1989, during the Velvet Revolution in Czechoslovakia. Pánek was a co-chair of the Central Students Strike Committee, organising strikes against the regime which precipitated the end of Communist rule.

== Life ==
In 1988, Šimon Pánek and Jaromír Štětina organised humanitarian assistance for Armenia, collecting materials to help people affected by a large earthquake. One year later, in 1989, Pánek became one of the student leaders of the Velvet Revolution in Czechoslovakia, where he was involved in organising anti-regime strikes and became a co-chair of the Central Students Strike Committee.

In 1992, he founded the news agency Epicentrum, which specialises in global conflict reporting. In 1992, Šimon Pánek co-founded Nadace Lidových novin (The Lidové noviny Foundation), now known as People in Need (PIN). Since that time, People in Need (PIN) has become the largest non-governmental organisation in Central and Eastern Europe, and works internationally to provide humanitarian aid in crisis zones.

Pánek was also a foreign policy adviser in the presidential administration of Václav Havel, specialising in the Balkan region and international human rights issues.

Since 2004, Pánek has chaired the Czech NGO development platform FoRS. He also chaired the board of the Open Society Foundation in Prague, and is a member of the boards of the European Partnership for Democracy and Eurostep. He is also a member of the European Council on Foreign Relations.

== Publication ==
- Studenti psali revoluci (students wrote a revolution), Praha. Univerzum. 1990, ISBN 80-85207-02-8 - With Marek Benda and Monika Pajerová.

== Honours ==
- European of the Year (2002)
- Medal of Merit III. class (2002)
- European of the Year Award (2003)
- Order of Tomáš Garrigue Masaryk III. class (2025)
