= Civic Assistance Committee =

Russian NGO

The Civic Assistance Committee (Komitet Grazhdanskoe Sodeistvie) is a Russian NGO which campaigns for human rights, particularly with regard to immigrants and refugees in Russian society.

== History ==
Svetlana Gannushkina cofounded the Civic Assistance Committee in 1990. The first refugees needing the Committee's help were some of the almost 40,000 Armenians who had fled from the Baku pogroms to Moscow. Gannushkina recalled that "No one wanted to deal with them and Gorbachev could only say they would all go back at some point. But in the meantime, the refugees had nowhere to go."

Later waves of post-Soviet immigration to Russia included refugees escaping Georgia and Abkhazia in 1993-1994 after the Georgian Civil War, Ukrainians arriving in 2014 after the Maidan Revolution, and Syrians fleeing the Syrian civil war. In 2015 2,276 people, amongst them 1,546 refugees, applied to the Civic Assistance Committee for assistance.

After an ambiguous stipulation by the Ministry of Education and Science in January 2014, requiring proof of registration for foreign children in school, the Civic Assistance Committee succeeded in challenging 76 cases where schools had denied access to immigrant children.

In April 2015, Russia's Ministry of Justice added the Committee to the so-called list of "foreign agent".
