= Nasta Loika =

Belarusian human rights activist (born 1989)

- Наста Лойка
- Born: 6 January 1989 (age 37); Belarus
- Occupation: Human rights activist

Anastasiya Yurewna "Nasta" Loika (Belarusian: Анастасія Юр'еўна "Наста" Лойка; born 6 January 1989) is a Belarusian human rights activist. She was imprisoned between 2023 and 2026 on charges of inciting hatred and disrupting public order, during which time she was considered to be a prisoner of conscience by Amnesty International.

== Activism ==
Loika was known primarily for her work in human rights education, including analysing anti-extremism laws passed by the Belarusian government. She worked for various human rights organisations in Belarus, including Viasna and Human Constanta, the latter of which was liquidated by authorities during the government's crackdown on civil society groups between July and October 2021.

Loika was also known for her advocacy for the rights of migrants and stateless people living within Belarus. She was also a proponent of the non-governmental organisation Civil Rights Defenders' Natalia Project, which aimed to provide human rights activists with personal security alarms; Loika promoted the use of alarms amongst Belarusian activists.

== Arrests and detention ==
=== August 2021 arrest ===
In August 2021, during the Belarusian government's crackdown on human rights groups, Loika was arrested after activating her personal security alarm in Minsk. She was subsequently charged with "assisting tax evasion", and placed under a travel ban in addition to having her bank accounts frozen.

=== September 2022 arrest ===
On 6 September 2022, Loika was arrested and detained as she left Minsk City Court, where she had been attending the trial of ten of her fellow activists, including Marfa Rabkova and Andrei Chapyuk. The following day, Loika was charged with "petty hooliganism" and detained for 30 days before being released on 6 October.

=== October 2022 arrest, trial and imprisonment ===
On 28 October 2022, Loika was arrested and detained by Belarusian authorities. Shortly afterwards, she appeared in a video posted online, in which she stated that she had "received funding from foreign organisations". Loika was detained for 15 days, following which she was rearrested and detained for a further 15 days; this happened four times in total between 28 October and 14 December.

During her detention, Loika stated that she had been tortured, including being hit with an electric shocker while being interviewed by officers from GUBOPiK; being forced to stand outside for eight hours in her underclothes; and being prevented from accessing warm clothing, medication and personal hygiene products. On 17 December, Loika filed a complaint with the United Nations Human Rights Committee, which subsequently requested that Belarusian authorities provide her with care to treat Loika's physical and mental health.

In late December, following her fourth arrest, Loika was formally charged under articles 130 ("incitement to hatred") and 342 ("organisation and preparation of actions grossly disrupting public order, or active participation in them") of the Criminal Code of Belarus. The international coalition World Organisation Against Torture condemned the charges against Loika, and urged Belarusian authorities to immediately release her, as did the Ireland-based human rights organisation Front Line Defenders.

Loika's legal team faced harassment from state authorities; in November 2022, Loika's lawyer, Tatsiana Lishankova, was arrested and subsequently lost her licence to practice law, while in March 2023, Inessa Olenskaya's law examination qualification was rejected by the Ministry of Justice.

Loika's trial began on 13 June 2023 at Minsk City Court. It was held behind closed doors, but the evidence used against Loika allegedly included her contributing to the report "Persecution of the Anarchists, Antifascists, Leftists and Social Activists in Belarus (2017–August 2018)", which had been critical of the police. On 20 June, judge Alena Shylko found Loika guilty, and sentenced her to seven years in prison at a penal colony in Gomel.

Loika appealed the result. On 3 October, the Supreme Court of Belarus upheld the verdict. In October 2023, the State Security Committee of the Republic of Belarus added Loika to its "terrorist" list; the following month, the Ministry of Internal Affairs named Loika on its "list of extremists".

Between August 2025 and January 2026, Loika was held in solitary confinement.

During Loika's detention, she was symbolically adopted by Ben Chikha, a member of the Belgian Senate, as part of Libereco's #WeStandByYou campaign, in which members of the Belgian, German and European parliaments became "godparents" of Belarusian political prisoners. Dunja Mijatović, the Commissioner for Human Rights for the Council of Europe, described Loika's sentence as "another illustration of the systematic repression against civil society and critical voices". A joint statement by 15 human rights organisations, including Redress and Human Rights Watch, called for Loika's immediate release.

== Release and exile ==
In March 2026, Amnesty International called for Loika to be released from prison, stating she had been tortured and was suffering from ill health. It described the charges against her as being "trumped up". It recognised her as a prisoner of conscience.

On 19 March 2026, Loika was released, among 250 political prisoners pardoned in an amnesty, including Marfa Rabkova. Loika was subsequently deported to Lithuania. Her release was praised by Civil RIghts Defenders and Amnesty International.

== Recognition ==
Loika was the 2022 laureate of the Belarusian Human Rights Defenders Awards' Human Rights Defender of the Year at the Barys Zvozskau Belarusian Human Rights House in Vilnius, Lithuania in January 2023.
