= Su Su Nway =

Burmese democracy activist

Su Su Nway စုစုနွေး
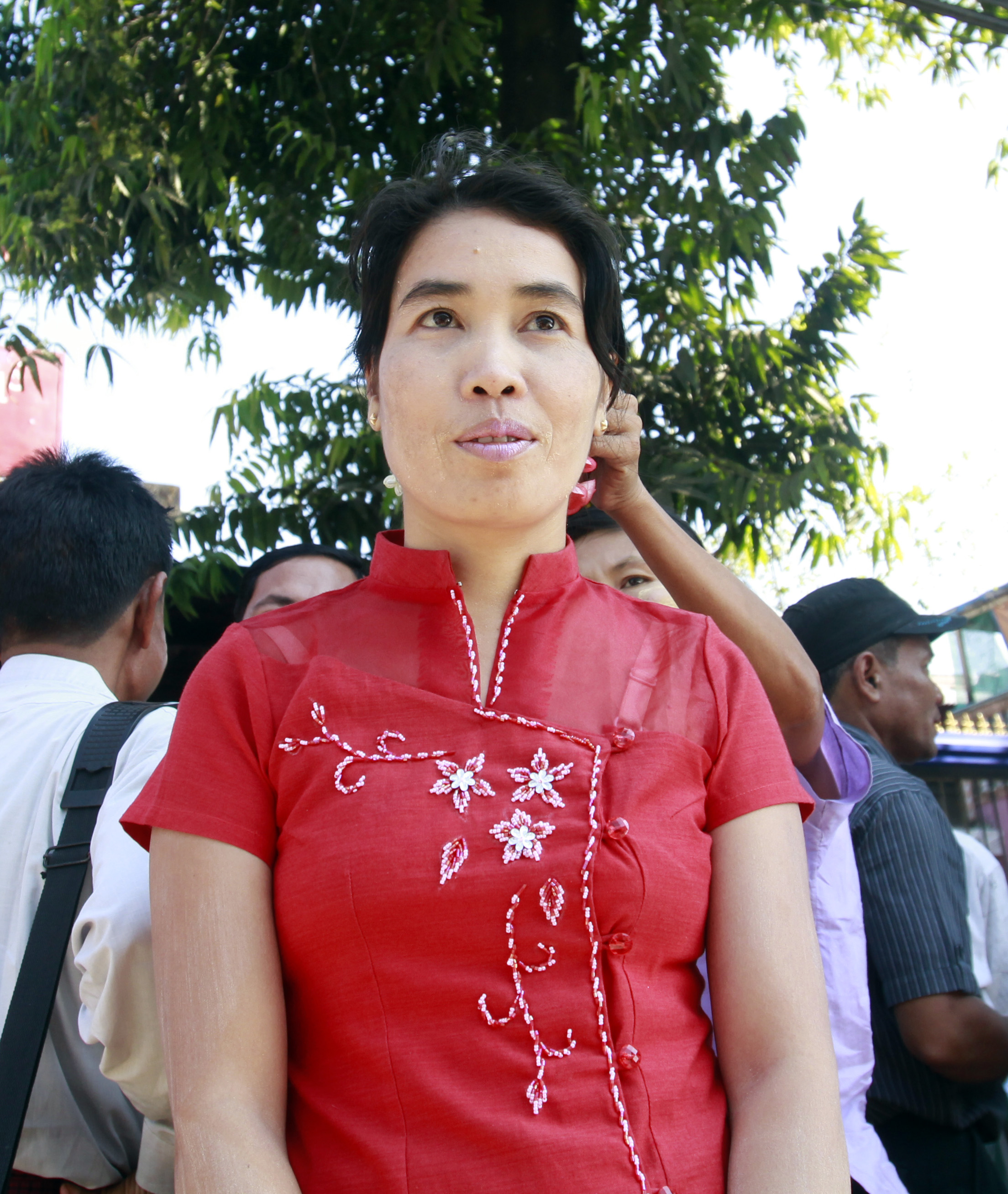
- Su Su Nway in 2011

Chairman of Myanmar Farmer Union
- Incumbent
- Assumed office 2012

Personal details
- Born: 1971 (age 54–55)
- Party: National League for Democracy
- Occupation: politician, activist
- Awards: Homo Homini Award (2007)

Awards	human rights award from National League for Democracy; John Humphrey Freedom Award; Homo Homini Award

Su Su Nway (Burmese: စုစုနွေး, MLCTS: cu. cu. nwe:, IPA: [sṵ sṵ nwé]; born 1971; also known as Su Su Nwe) is a Burmese democracy activist and political prisoner. In 2005, she became the first Burmese national to successfully sue local government officials under a 1999 law on forced labour.

== Forced labor case and subsequent imprisonment ==
Su Su Nway is from Htan Manaing village, Kawhmu Township (located 50 mi from Yangon), in Yangon region. She filed a complaint after she, along with other villagers, were forced into working on a road construction project by the local Village Tract Peace and Development Council. The case was then pursued by NLD lawyers. As a result of the case, on 3 September 2004, Sein Paw, Chairman of the Htanmanaing Village Tract Peace and Development Council, was sentenced to 16 months in prison, while Council members Kyaw Thin, Myint Thein, and Aung Khin were sentenced to eight months each. Following the court case, Su Su Nway stated that Sein Paw passed her on the road with a companion and told her she should be "beaten to death".

In 2005, the new town chairman charged her with harassment and defamation, a tactic that the Asian Human Rights Commission noted to be a common reprisal against Burmese activists. Su Su Nway was then sentenced to an 18-month term in Insein Prison. Before her sentencing, she told reporters, "I have no responsibility, no power and no position. They plot against a common girl, a disease sufferer, and sue her because they are afraid. If they are afraid like that, our side is winning."

In February 2006, Nway attempted to appeal to the Supreme Court, but her case was rejected, after having appealed to district courts that rejected her cases. She was released on 6 June 2006, as a result of international pressure from the United States government, the International Labour Organization (ILO), the United Nations (UN), and NGOs.

Now (2018) Su Su Nway established the Myanmar Farmer Union in 2012 and she became the Chairperson. Su Su Nway teach her members of Myanmar Farmer Union Land Law.

== Second imprisonment ==
Su Su Nway was in hiding for much of 2007, but took part in the August protests against high fuel prices, narrowly escaping a second arrest. On 13 November 2007, she was arrested for hanging a banner near the hotel where UN Human Rights Envoy Paulo Pinheiro was staying while visiting the country.

On 11 November 2008, Su Su Nway was sentenced to 12 years and six months in prison. This was reduced by four years in February 2009. Su Su Nway is currently in Hkamti Prison in Sagaing Region. She suffers from a congenital heart condition and high blood pressure, and was initially denied her heart medication by prison officials. She was hospitalized on 20 May 2009, and though she recovered, Amnesty International reports that prison officials have continued to deny her family visits, sufficient food, clean clothes, and adequate medical care.

== Release ==
On 10 October 2011, she was released along with comedian Zarganar and 88 Generation Student Group activist Zaw Htet Ko Ko as part of a series of amnesties for political prisoners.

== Recognition ==
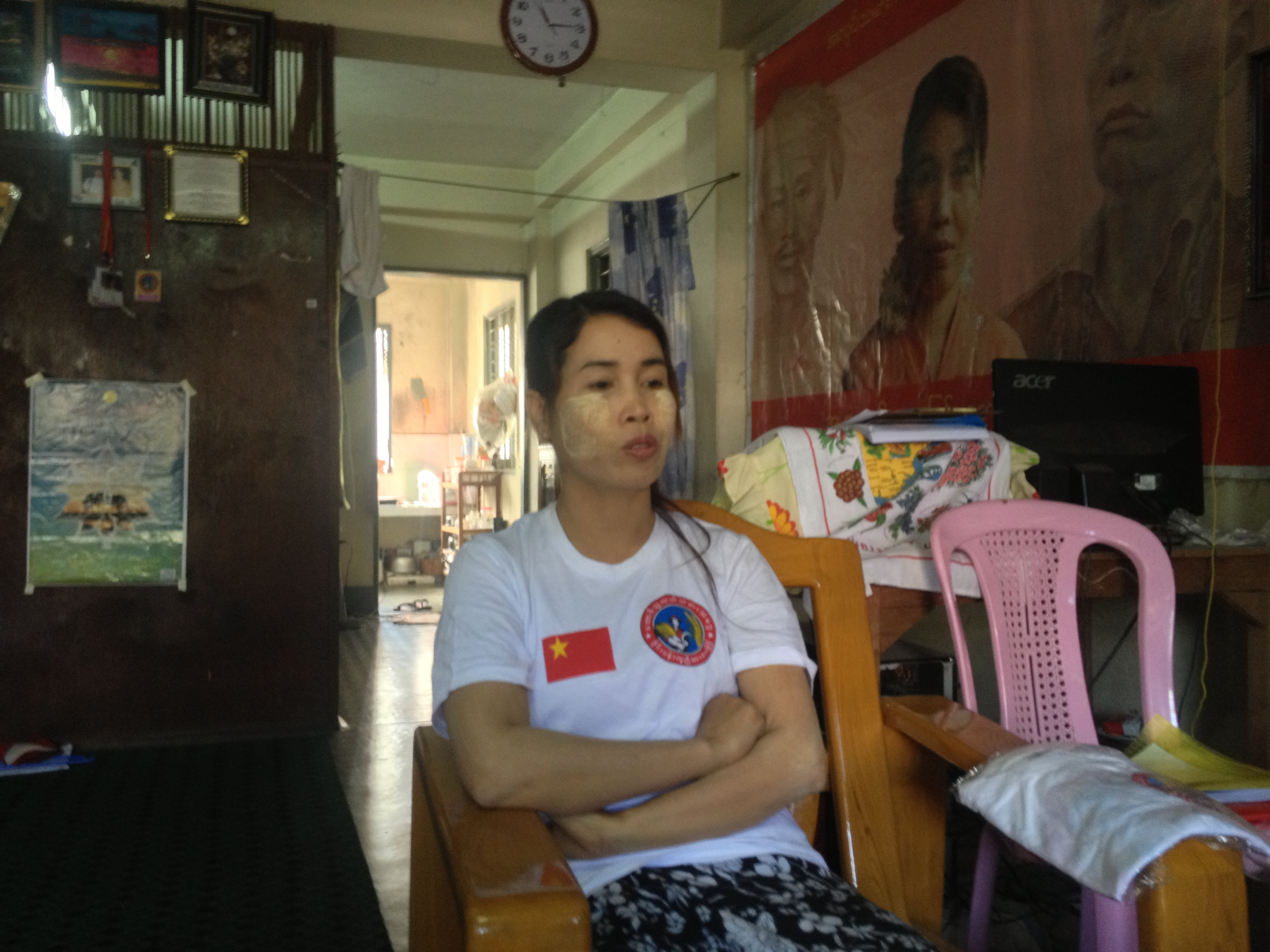
Su Su Nway in her apartment in Yangon, Myanmar on 26 January 2013

In 2005, Su Su Nway received a human rights award from the NLD. The following year, she was awarded the John Humphrey Freedom Award by the Canadian human rights group Rights & Democracy. In 2007, People in Need awarded Su Su Nway, Phyu Phyu Thin, and Nilar Thein their Homo Homini Award. Amnesty International considers her a prisoner of conscience and a "priority case". UNISON, the UK's second-largest trade union, issued a statement on her behalf on 23 September 2010, and general secretary Dave Prentis was photographed with her name on his hand for an Amnesty International campaign. Liverpool MP Luciana Berger was also photographed for the campaign.
