= Majid Tavakoli =

Iranian student leader, human rights activist and political prisoner

- Persian: مجید توکلی
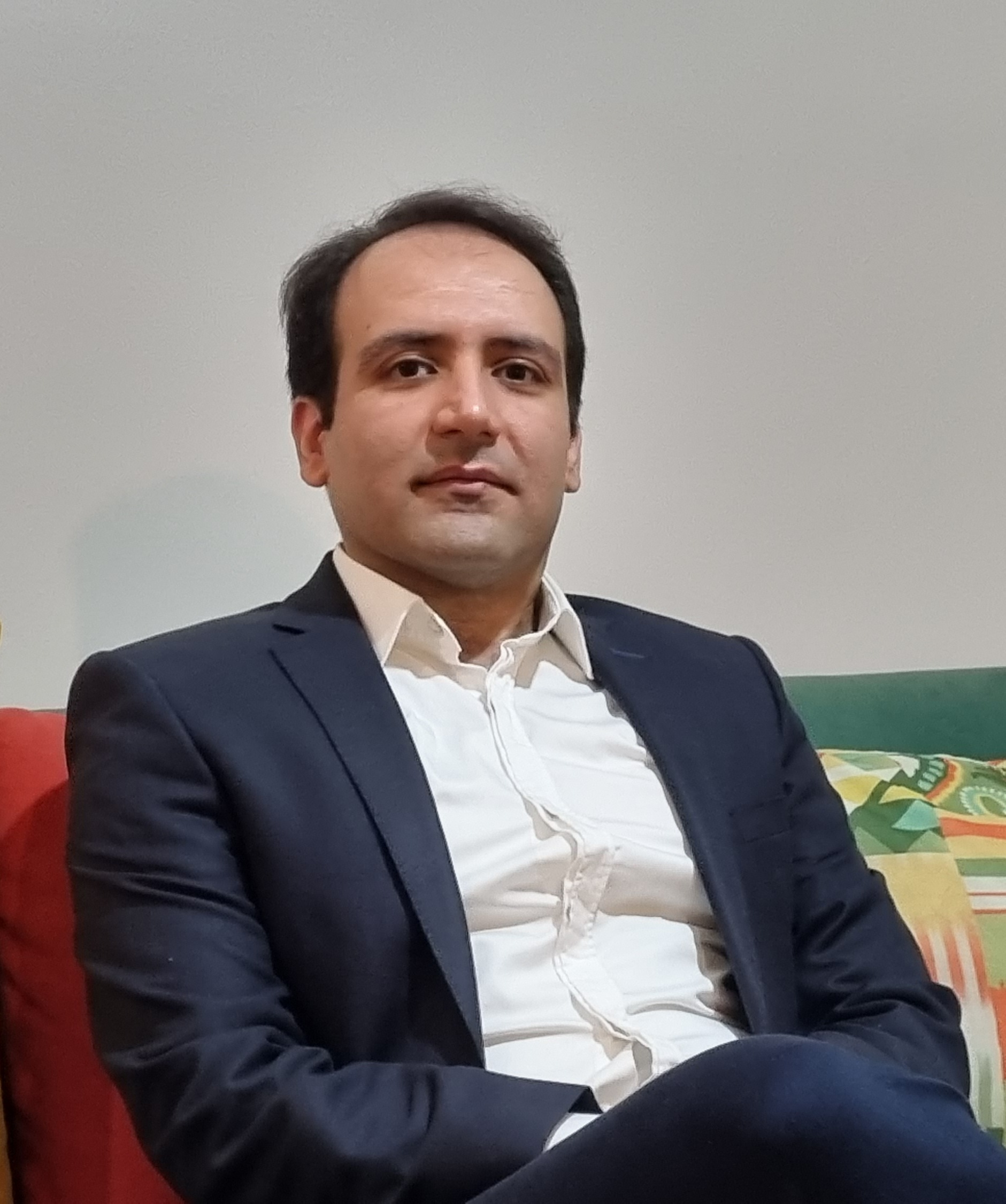
- Born: 1986 (age 39–40); Shiraz, Iran
- Occupation: Student movement activist

Majid Tavakoli (Persian: مجید توکلی; born 1986) is an Iranian student leader, human rights activist and political prisoner. He used to be a member of the Islamic Students' Association at Tehran's Amirkabir University of Technology, where he studied shipbuilding. He was arrested at least three times by the Iranian Ministry of Intelligence, during the student protests over the disputed Presidential Election of 2009. In response to allegations that he cross-dressed as a disguise to avoid arrest, a campaign protesting his imprisonment featured men posting photos of themselves wearing hijab.

He was arrested again during the Iranian protests following the death of Mahsa Amini in September 2022.

== Arrests, imprisonment ==
=== 2006 arrest ===
In 2006, he was imprisoned for 15 months for insulting religion and the country's leadership in student publications, an accusation he denies.

=== February 2009 Arrest ===
Majid Tavakoli was detained on 5 February 2009, at Mehdi Bazargan's memorial. He was released on bail after spending 115 days in solitary confinement in Evin Prison.

=== December 2009 arrest ===
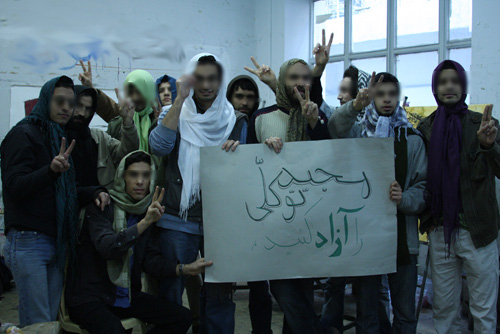
Tavakoli supporters in Iran

Tavakoli was arrested on 7 December 2009 after addressing a crowd at Amir Kabir University of Technology on National Student Day (one of many protests over the disputed June 2009 presidential election). After his arrest, semi-official new websites including Fars News and Raja News published pictures of Tavakoli dressed in women's clothing or "hijab," taken while he was in custody, claiming Tavakoli attempted to avoid arrest by dressing in "women's clothing".

According to human rights activists however, eyewitnesses present at the time of his arrest "have denied all the news published by pro-Ahmadinejad media", and stated that he was forced to put on the hijab by security forces to discredit and ridicule him. In their report, Fars News Agency had compared Tavakkoli to Iranian ex-President Abolhassan Banisadr, who according to "an old allegation", dressed as a woman while escaping Iran.

In solidarity with Tavakoli, hundreds of Iranian men posted pictures of themselves in Islamic hijab, on various websites, under the slogan, "Be a man". The campaign called for an end to mistreatment of Iranian prisoners including Tavakoli. Some of the website's readers also call the campaign a gesture of solidarity with Iranian women, who are compelled by law in Iran to wear the hijab.

=== Trial and imprisonment ===
Following a trial which he was reportedly not allowed to attend, Tavakoli was convicted of offenses which included "participating in an illegal gathering", "propaganda against the system", and "insulting officials" and sentenced to eight and a half years in prison. From January to May 2010, he was held primarily in solitary confinement in Evin prison.

On 17 May 2010, he began a hunger strike. On 26 May, his mother joined his hunger strike in an attempt to raise awareness of his imprisonment. While on hunger strike, his health deteriorated quickly, and on the fourth day, he suffered from stomach hemorrhage and was unable to speak due to weakness and dehydration. In August 2010, he was moved to Raja'i Shahr prison to be housed with violent offenders.

Tavakoli has a respiratory ailment, which reportedly has worsened due to his continued imprisonment.

Tavakoli was released from prison on bail for four days in October 2013, and again in April 2015, but his prison term was reportedly over as of 10 May 2015, except that he still had to serve a 5-year restriction on political activities and a 5-year ban from leaving Iran.

=== 2022 arrest ===
Tavakoli was arrested again during the September 2022 Iranian protests following the death of Mahsa Amini. His brother Mohsen Tavakoli announced his arrest on 23 September on Twitter and reported that the security forces came into the house at night by creating panic and took his brother away. On 5 October, Tavakoli's wife reported in a tweet, that he has called and informed her about catching COVID-19 inside prison. Tavakoli has been kept in solitary confinement since 22 September.

== International recognition ==
In 2009, Tavakoli was awarded Homo Homini Award, annually bestowed by People In Need on people who have contributed significantly to the cause of human rights. Tavakoli was awarded beside Abdollah Momeni, one of the student leaders from 1999 protests, which became the biggest rising since the Islamic revolution.

Amnesty International considers Tavakoli to be a prisoner of conscience, and named him a 2011 "priority case." Human Rights Watch also protested Tavakoli's imprisonment.

Tavakoli was awarded the Student Peace Prize in 2013 for September 2012.

== See also ==
- Human rights in Iran
- Compulsory Hijab Laws in Iran
- ‌Mahsa Amini protests
- Detainees of the Mahsa Amini protests
