= Svetlana Gannushkina =

Russian human rights activist

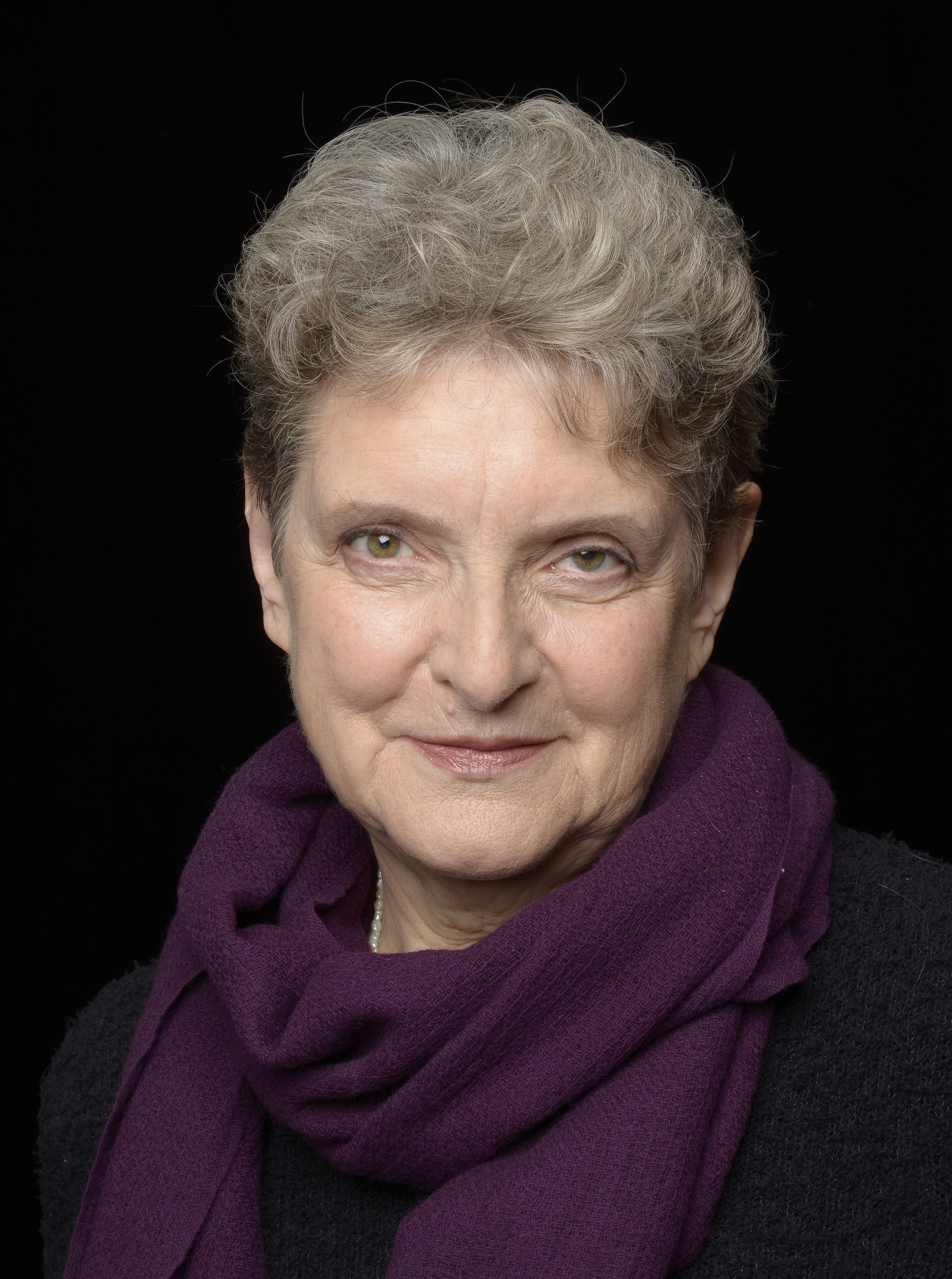
Svetlana Gannushkina

Svetlana Alekseevna Gannushkina (Russian: Светла́на Алексе́евна Га́ннушкина, born 6 March 1942) is a mathematician and human rights activist in Russia who was reported to have been a serious contender for the 2010 Nobel Peace Prize.

Gannushkina became well-known in Russia as a human rights defender in 1990s when many conflicts broke in the countries of the former Soviet Union. Her human rights work dedicated especially to help refugees, internally displaced persons, victims of war.

== Early life and education ==
Gannushkina was born in Moscow on March 6, 1942. She graduated from the Moscow State University's Faculty of Mechanics and Mathematics.

== Work ==
Gannushkina worked for many years as a professor of mathematics at the Russian State University for the Humanities. In 1990, she helped to found the Civic Assistance Committee (Komitet Grazhdanskoe Sodeistvie), an NGO which campaigns for human rights, particularly with regard to immigrants and refugees in Russian society. Since 2015, the organization is labelled a "foreign agent" by the Russian government.

Gannushkina was a member of Presidential Council for Civil Society and Human Rights until 2011. She is also on the council of Memorial, a society dedicated to the remembrance of victims of Soviet repression.

Gannushkina is a member of the Yabloko Federal Political Committee.

== Awards ==
- 1997 Open Society Foundations prize for trailblazing work in Russia.
- 2006 Homo Homini Award for human rights activism by the Czech group People in Need.
- 2016 Right Livelihood Award, often referred to as "Alternative Nobel Prize", in Stockholm, Sweden, "for her decades-long commitment to promoting human rights and justice for refugees and forced migrants, and tolerance among different ethnic groups".

== See also ==
- Human rights in Russia
