= Doctors Coordinate of Damascus =

Doctors Coordinate of Damascus (sometimes called Damascus Doctors) is a network of health care workers that provides clandestine medical aid to injured civilians of the Syrian Civil War. The group treats bystanders cut off from regular medical care by the ongoing violence as well as injured protesters who would be at risk during the regular security sweeps of local hospitals. According to Amnesty International, injured protesters face arrest and torture if found in Syrian hospitals, and in some cases medical staff has even participated in the torture of the patients. In other cases, injured opposition members have been forcibly disconnected from medical equipment, including respirators. In the summer of 2011, the Doctors Coordinate constructed a clandestine field hospital to treat the growing number of wounded.

One of the organization's founders, Dr. Ibrahim Othman, became one of the Syrian government's most wanted men for his work with the group. On 11 December 2011, opposition forces announced that he had been killed by Syrian security forces while attempting to flee to Turkey.

In 2011, the Czech NGO People in Need awarded the group its Homo Homini Award, recognizing "the outstanding courage and effort they demonstrate when they put their own lives at risk to help civilians who have been injured as a result of brutal repression by the current Syrian regime."
