= Marfa Rabkova =

Belarusian human rights activist

- Марфа Рабкова
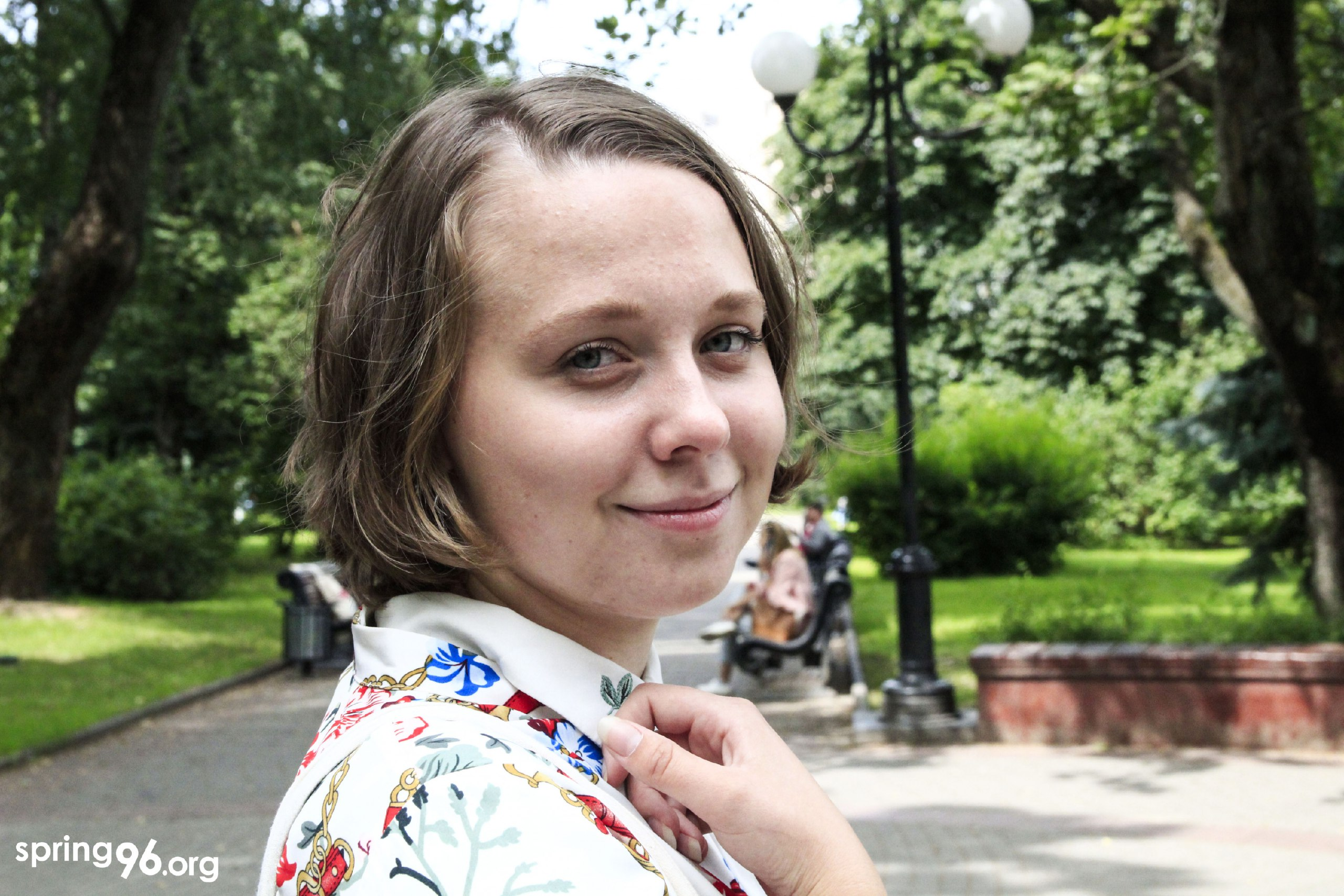
- Born: 6 January 1995 (age 31)
- Citizenship: Belarusian
- Organization: Viasna Human Rights Centre
- Known for: 2021 imprisonments

Marfa Alyaksandraŭna Rabkova (Belarusian: Марыя Аляксандраўна Рабкова; born 6 January 1995) is a Belarusian human rights activist who works for the Viasna Human Rights Centre. In 2020 she was arrested by the Belarusian authorities for her activism and sent to the pre-trial prison SIZO No. 1. She was released on March 19, 2026 following the lifting of some sanctions on Belarus by the United States.

== Biography ==
Marfa (Maria) Rabkova was born in 1995. She attended the Belarusian State Pedagogical University but was forced to withdraw after being detained during a march near a university building. She then enrolled at the A. Kuleshov Mogilev State University but claimed that she was unable to complete her studies and find a job due to pressure from the authorities. In 2017, she entered the European Humanities University in Vilnius, Lithuania. In 2019, she became a manager of the volunteers' network of Viasna Human Rights Centre in Belarus.

In 2020, Rabkova volunteered with the Viasna Human Rights Centre as a coordinator over the course of the 2020 Belarusian presidential election. During this election, Alyaksandr Lukashenka falsified the election results in order to gain a sixth term. This fraud prompted a pro-democracy movement across Belarus. At the start of the mass protests, she began to document evidence of torture and abuse by the Belarusian authorities. Rabkova's role in this movement included gathering testimonies from protesters who were subjected to violence by security forces. She worked tirelessly to collect visual evidence, including photographs and videos, that would later be used in international advocacy for human rights in Belarus. Her work was critical in drawing attention to the government's brutality during this period, and she played a key role in coordinating with international organizations to ensure these abuses were widely known.

She was detained on September 17, 2020, by members of the Belarusian Ministry of Internal Affairs, specifically from the Main Department for Combating Organized Crime and Corruption unit. Rabkova is one of five Human Rights Centre Viasna members that are currently imprisoned. In 2021, three other members of the Human Rights Centre Viasna were detained on charges similar to Rabkova's: Ales Bialiatski, Valiantsin Stefanovic, and Uldazimir Labkovich. These detainees show an ongoing problem in Belarus where activists who speak out are severely punished by the government. On September 19, 2021, Rabkova was transferred to SIZO No. 1 in Minsk.

Several Belarusian human rights groups recognized her as a political prisoner. International human rights organizations Amnesty International, Front Line Defenders, and the Observatory for the Protection of Human Rights Defenders demanded her immediate release. In the pre-trial prison, she was not provided with proper living conditions. Her health declined, and she complained of abdominal pain, tooth pain, and inflammation of the lymph nodes, but did not get adequate medical treatment. In June and July 2021, she fainted due to her weakness. In March 2022, she finally received medical attention where it was discovered she had fluid in her pelvis. She may need surgury in the future. Her teeth would continue to cause her pain and deteriorate. According to her husband, she lost 20 kg in prison, contracted COVID-19, and started to experience fainting and low blood pressure. She also wasn't allowed to attend her father's funeral. In prison, she often reads the writings of a Russian novelist, Ivan Turgenev. She also writes letters to her husband.

In response to her criminal charges, Rabkova's last recorded words in court were “You are labeling me as ‘extremist’, stating that I was a destructive element, I was hateful, and I had lost my roots. But I am just as much a part of society as the rest of you. The only difference about me is that I call things for what they are and I cannot ignore them. Violence is violence, repressions are repressions, and war is war. There is no other way."

== Timeline of arrest and charges ==
On September 17, 2020, Rabkova and her husband were detained in Minsk. Their home was searched and their personal items were seized. Initially, Rabkova was charged under article 293 of the Criminal Code (Part 3, "Training or other preparation of persons for participation in mass riots, or financing of this activity"). This charge was part of a broader crackdown on pro-democracy activists and was widely viewed as politically motivated. This initial charge carriers a maximum sentence of three years.

On September 19, 2021, she was transferred to SIZO No. 1 in Minsk.

On February 11, 2021, Rabkova was charged for "inciting social hostility to the government by a group of unidentified individuals." Her charges were Part 3 of Art. 130 ("Incitement to hatred") and Part 2 of Art. 285 ("Participation in a criminal organization"). Based on these charges, she faced the possibility of being imprisoned for up to 12 years. These charges allude to corruptive measures as her initial period of investigation was supposed to expire in five days.

In late November 2021, Rabkova was given eleven charges and faced 20 years of incarceration. This marked a severe escalation in the Belarusian government's campaign to silence dissent. The charges were widely criticized as being fabricated to prevent Rabkova from continuing her human rights work.

On January 11, 2022, her case was sent to a prosecutor's office. This was the time when concerns about Rabkova's health condition in prison began to circulate, as reports emerged about the poor conditions she was being held under.

On April 25, 2022, Rabkova’s closed trial in Minsk Municipal began. Her trial was closed off, because of the "extremist" topics that would be discussed in trial, raising concerns about the fairness of the legal proceedings. Observers noted that the trial was being held in a climate of increasing suppression of political speech in Belarus.

On September 6, 2022, there was finally a verdict after a four month long private trial. Rabkova was sentenced to 15 years in a general-security penal colony and a fine of 22,400 Belarusian rubles (more than $8,800). This sentence was condemned by human rights organizations, with many stating that the trial had been unjust and based on political reasons.

On January 6, 2023, Rabkova's husband, Vadim Zheromsky, was arrested by authorities. Belarusian authorities have been documented as retaliating against family members advocating for their imprisoned loved ones, further worsening the situation for Rabkova’s supporters.

On February 28, 2023, the Supreme Court changed the final sentence for Rabkova into 14 years and 9 months of imprisonment in a general-security penal colony. This reduction in sentence was seen as a partial victory, but concerns about her health and ongoing harsh conditions in prison continued.

In March 2023, Belarusian authorities put Rabkova on a terrorist list. She is unable to receive monetary transfers.

In March 2026, Rabkova was released along with 249 political prisoners following the lifting of some sanctions on Belarus by the United States, including Nasta Loika, who herself had been arrested after attending Rabkova's trial in September 2022. She was de facto exiled to Lithuania

== International support ==
On Rabkova's 29th birthday, January 6, Agnieszka Brugger, who is known as "godmother" of the Viasna Human Rights campaign and deputy of German Bundestag, wrote Rabkova a birthday letter and connected it to the #WeStandByYou campaign. The #WeStandByYou campaign appoints members of European Parliament to advocate for the release of Belarusian political prisoners. The #WeStandByYou campaign currently supports more than 20 political prisoners arrested in Belarus for demonstrating in support of free and fair elections and democracy in their country.

Brugger's letter expresses deep respect for Rabkova's strength and commitment to democracy and human rights. She also condemns her harsh punishment and expresses concern for her health. In addition, Brugger writes about her efforts and another 100 deputies of the German Bundestag that have signed a letter, to be sent to the Belarusian authorities, demanding for Rabkova's urgent medical care along with the demand for the prompt and absolute release of Rabkova and all other political prisoners. Furthermore, Brugger mentions a speech by the Belarusian Opposition leader, Sviatlana Tsikhounouskaya, that highlights international concern. The letter ends with wishing Rabkova well-being, and states hope that one day they will be able to celebrate her birthday after her release.

The Amnesty International operates a campaign encouraging the public to advocate to Belarusian authorities for Rabkova's release. Numerous other groups have also advocated for the release of political prisoners in Belarus. Some of them are The Observatory for the Protection of Human Rights Defenders, The Norwegian Helsinki Committee, the Human Rights House Foundation, Right Livelihood, Östgruppen, Civil Rights Defenders, Human Rights Watch, The Barys Zvozskau Belarusian Human Rights House, Front Line Defenders, and the Helsinki Foundation for Human Rights.

== Awards ==
In 2020, Rabkova, along with three other detained Viasna members (Andrei Chapiuk, Leanid Sudalenka and Tatsiana Lasitsa), was awarded the Homo Homini prize. This award recognizes activists who have significantly advanced the causes of democracy, nonviolent activism, and human rights within their countries.

== Media ==
A book titled, Wenn du durch die Hölle gehst, dann geh weiter (If you Go through Hell, Don't Stop), was published in Germany on November 23, 2023. This book focuses on female political prisoners in Belarus. The novel was developed with support from the Viasna Human Rights Centre and the Politzek.me initiative. This book includes material collected over 15 months, featuring interviews, testimonies, and court statements from many female political prisoners, including Rabkova. Rabkova's letters from prison are featured and demonstrate her continued dedication to human rights work. In one of the letters, she wrote: "I will do my best to educate, bring knowledge, and protect human rights regardless of borders, time, and place."

Rabkova has also received attention via social media. #FreeViasna shared of Rabkova and her detainment on the site BlueSky. The Human Rights House Foundation shared a post on facebook on Rabkova's 30th birthday, calling for her release. They shared a similar post on X.
