= Philip Obaji =

- Born: 8 August 1985 (age 40)
- Occupations: Television presenter, Activist

Philip Obaji Jr. (born 8 August 1985) is a Nigerian journalist, activist, and founder of 1 GAME: Football without Violence initiative. He was elected into the Executive Committee of the Cross River State Football Association in January 2011 and later appointed Chairman of the Association’s Media and Marketing Committee.

On March 30, 2011, he received a letter from the President of the Nigeria Football Federation commending his efforts to combat violence in football through his 1 GAME initiative. It is believed that the 1 GAME initiative which he founded has recorded more than 100,000 sign-ups on its website including endorsements from celebrities such as Jamaica’s reggae musician Shaggy, Hip-hop duo P-Square, former Nigeria senior national football team coach Samson Siasia, and former Nigeria Football Federation (NFF) President Aminu Maigari.

In April 2011, Obaji denied a report by an online portal that he was involved in a major disagreement with NFF President Aminu Maigari over media publications made by 1 GAME by saying: “There has never been a time I have had to disagree with him or anyone from the NFF.” Obaji told the Nigerian media in August 2011 that he would quit the board of the Cross River State Football Association if it continues to fail in its promises to the people that elected it.

In 2015, he won the Future Awards Africa Prize for Young Person of the Year.

As of mid-2024, he is an African correspondent for The Daily Beast.
