= Sapiyat Magomedova =

Russian human rights lawyer (1979-)

- Сапият Магомедова
- Born: February 11, 1979 (age 47); Artlukh, Dagestan ASSR
- Occupation: Lawyer
- Known for: Human rights activism
- Awards: Per Anger Prize (2012); Homo Homini Award (2013)

Sapiyat Akhmedovna Magomedova (Russian: Сапият Ахмедовна Магомедова; born 11 February 1979), sometimes spelled Sapijat Magomedova, is a Russian human rights activist and lawyer from Dagestan. A noted local lawyer in human rights abuses cases, she has presented cases before local courts and national courts, as well as at the European Court of Human Rights. She has experienced harassment, intimidation and threats due to her activism, and in recognition of her work was awarded the Homo Homini in 2013.

== Early life and education ==
Magomedova was born in the village of Artlukh, Kazbekovsky District, in what was then the Dagestan Autonomous Soviet Socialist Republic. She grew up in Khasavyurt, a city close to the border with Chechnya, and reported regularly seeing violence against civilians perpetrated by security forces. In 2001, she graduated with a degree in law from Dagestan State University in Makhachkala.

== Legal career ==
Magomedova works for Omarov A.S. and Sons, a law firm in Khasavyurt known for taking on cases of human rights abuses, including enforced disappearances, extrajudicial killings and torture contrary to the Russian constitution and international law. Magomedova also has taken on cases pertaining to sexual violence, which has been described as remaining "taboo" in Dagestan, where bride kidnappings and child marriages still occur.

=== 2010 assault ===
On 17 June 2010, Magomedova was physically assaulted by four police officers inside a police station in Khasavyurt, where she was representing a client who had been violently detained earlier that day. Magomedova reported falling unconscious as a result of the assault and requiring medical treatment in Makhachkala, where a forensic medical expert declined to examine her. Magomedova was critical of the police's investigation of the assault, citing that no arrests had been made despite her publicly naming the officers involved. One named officer subsequently filed a criminal case against Magomedova, claiming she had publicly insulted him, as well as alleging that she had assaulted the officers. Magomedova was subsequently placed under a travel restriction order. In October 2010, Magomedova filed a counter case questioning the legality of the restriction order, which was subsequently lifted.

The criminal case against Magomedova and the officers was closed on 28 December 2011, although Magomedova was not informed until 14 March 2012. She subsequently launched an appeal against the prosecutor's decision not to charge the officers. The International Federation of Human Rights, while agreeing with the charges against Magomedova being dropped, urged the Russian and Dagestani governments to charge reverse the decision not to charge the police officers with assault.

=== 2021 assault ===
In April 2021, following a court hearing for a client who was alleged to have been tortured by security forces, Magomedova locked herself and her client in a car to prevent him being questioned by officers outside of the court. Magomedova reported that security forces hit her when she left the vehicle and deleted footage of the incident from her phone.

== Recognition ==
In 2012, Magomedova was awarded the Per Anger Prize for human rights defenders for "her brave and risky work as a lawyer and fearless human rights defender in a violent and hostile environment". That same year, Caucasian Knot named her as "hero of the Caucuses" following a public vote on their website.

In 2013, Magomedova was awarded the Homo Homini Prize for "her courage in the defence of victims of human rights violations".
