= Politzek.me =

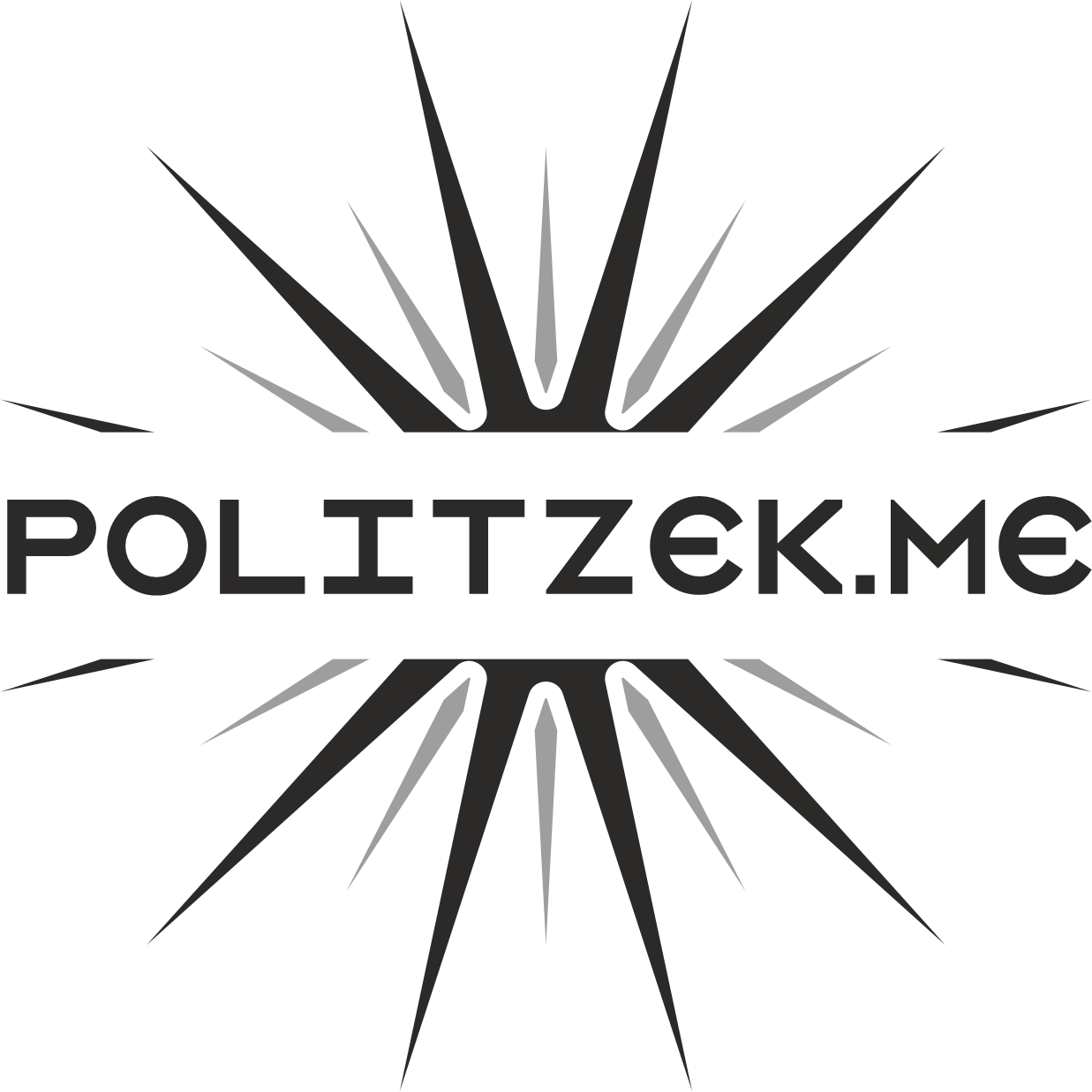
- Founder: Campaign team of Viktar Babaryka
- Type: Non-profit organization
- Purpose: Human rights in Belarus
- Location: Belarus, Poland, Lithuania
- Members: at november 2024 года it is 7 people who work for Politzek.Me працуе, and a number of volunteers.
- Key people: co-founder and leader - Ina Kavalionak

Politzek.me — is an advocacy platform designed to assist political prisoners in Belarus, featuring an up-to-date database of political prisoners in the country. It was established in November 2020 following the protests triggered by public rejection of the presidential election results by the campaign team of presidential candidate Viktar Babaryka with informational support from the Human Rights Center Viasna. The organization is led by its co-founder Inna Kavalionak.

== Organization Description ==
The platform was created to make the issue of political prisoners more accessible and to destigmatize them through innovative approaches. The project started as a website containing a database of Belarusian political prisoners and their stories. Visitors to the site can find current information about political prisoners, write letters to them, send postcards, make donations, or send parcels to detention centers. Users can also anonymously indicate that they are assisting a particular political prisoner by adding them as a friend on the site. Friendship involves performing specific supportive actions for the chosen political prisoner without direct contact. The number of friends each political prisoner has is displayed on Politzek.Me.

Politzek.Me believes that letters can be a source of encouragement and support for political prisoners, and donations to their families can alleviate financial difficulties faced after their relatives' detention, providing necessary resources to support the imprisoned.

The overall idea of the site is to enable people to act and support those fighting for democracy and human rights in Belarus, as well as to raise international awareness of the situation.

In February 2023, the Politzek.me team launched their online magazine "Politzek Times". The magazine covers the experiences of Belarusian political prisoners both during their imprisonment and after their release.

In November 2023, the project's web pages were recognized as "extremist materials" in Belarus, and in April 2024, the Ministry of Internal Affairs of the Republic of Belarus declared Politzek.Me an extremist group.

Politzek.Me continually updates its list of political prisoners as their number changes daily. As of November 2021, Politzek.Me identified 1074 political prisoners in Belarus; in December 2021 – 1104 prisoners; in May 2022 – 1457 prisoners. The number of political prisoners increased rapidly throughout 2021 and 2022, reaching 1651 by October 2022.

As of July 2024, Politzek.Me identifies 1,570 political prisoners in Belarus.

== Politzek.me Partners ==
- Human Rights Center Viasna
- Pismo.bel
- Dissident.by

== Links ==
- politzek.me. "Истории из мира политзаключенных, без которых мы уже не мы". Politzek times - Время политзеков (in Russian). Archived from the original on 29 March 2023.
