= Artlukh =

Artlukh Артлух ГӀаркьукъ
- Selo
- Location within Republic of Dagestan Location within Russia
- Coordinates: 42°51′N 46°40′E
- Country: Russia
- Region: Republic of Dagestan
- District: Kazbekovsky District
- Time zone: UTC+3:00

Artlukh (Russian: Артлух; Avar: ГӀаркьукъ) is a rural locality (a selo) and the administrative centre of Artlukhsky Selsoviet, Kazbekovsky District, Republic of Dagestan, Russia. The population was 365 as of 2010. There are 8 streets.

== Nationalities ==
Avars live there.

== Geography ==
Artlukh is located 38 km south of Dylym (the district's administrative centre) by road. Danukh and Gadari are the nearest rural localities.
