= Phyu Phyu Thin =

Burmese politician and activist

- ဖြူဖြူသင်း
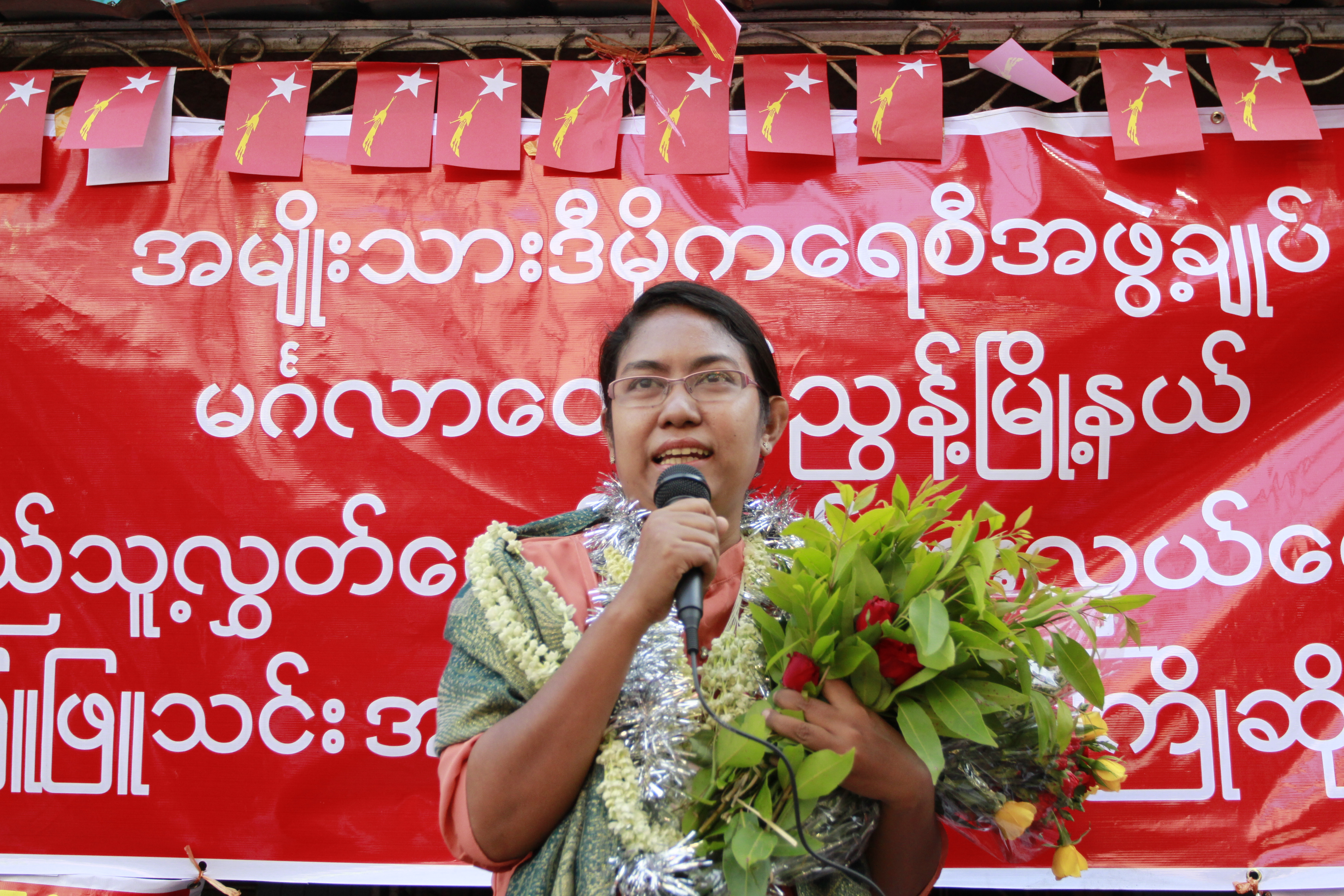
- Phyu Phyu Thin makes a campaign speech in Yangon's Mingala Taungnyunt Township in 2012

Member of the Pyithu Hluttaw from Mingalataungnyunt Township
- In office 2 May 2012 – 1 February 2021
- Preceded by: Aung Kyi

Personal details
- Born: 23 December 1972 (age 53)
- Party: National League for Democracy
- Awards: Homo Homini Award (2007)

Phyu Phyu Thin (Burmese: ဖြူဖြူသင်း, IPA: [pʰjù pʰjù θɪ́ɰ̃]; born 23 December 1971) is a Burmese politician and HIV/AIDS activist who served as a House of Representatives MP for Mingala Taungnyunt Township from 2012 until her removal from office in the 2021 Myanmar coup d'état.

== Political imprisonment ==
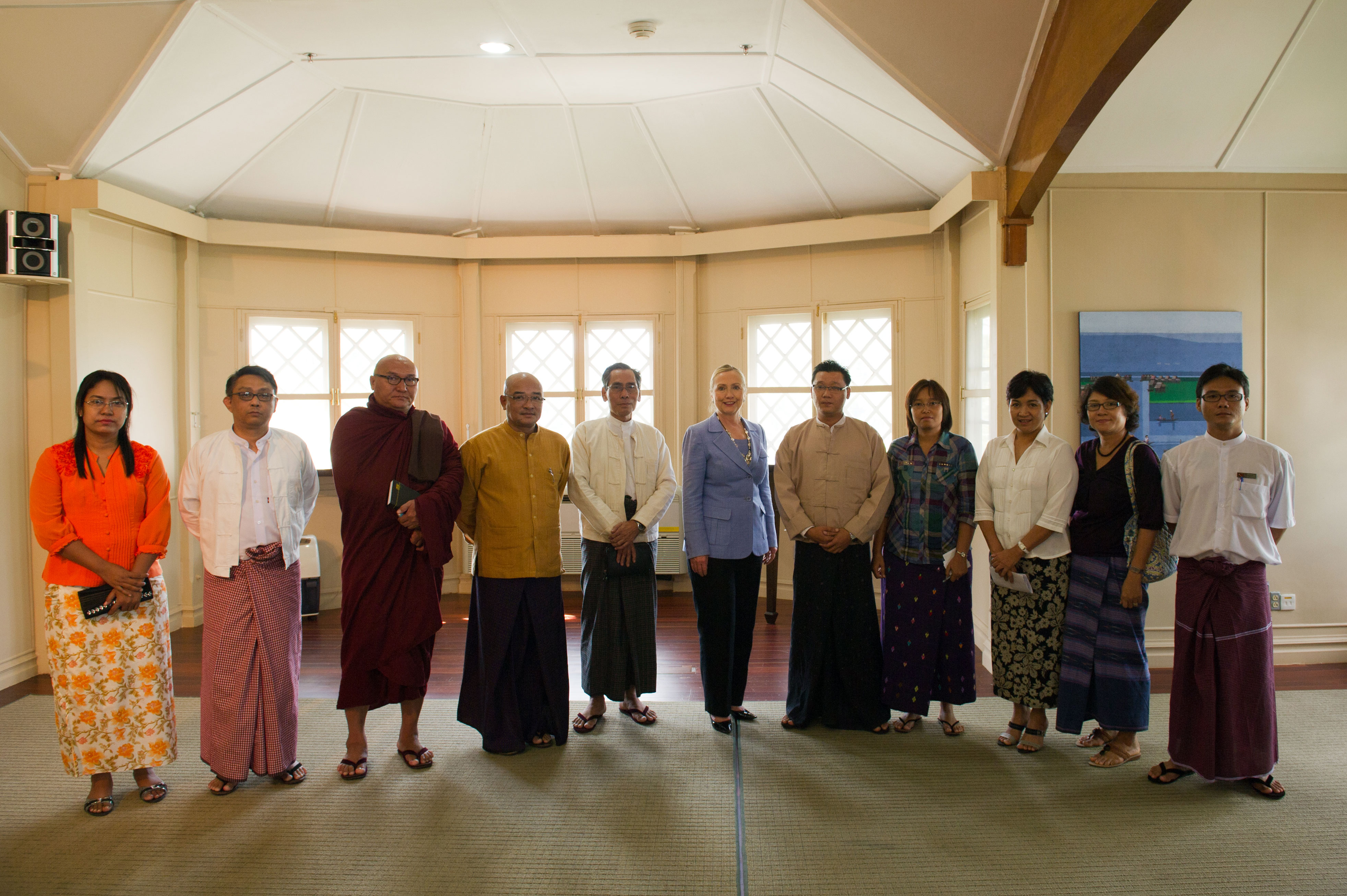
In December 2011, US Secretary of State Hillary Clinton met with Phyu Phyu Thin, along with other civil society representatives. (Clicking on a person's face will take you to an article about the person.)

On May 21, 2007, Phyu Phyu Thin was arrested by police in Yangon for organizing a prayer rally to call for the release of detained National League for Democracy leader Aung San Suu Kyi. Never told what crime she had committed, she was held for more than a month, and was released on July 2, 2007.

As an activist, Phyu Phyu Thin has been an outspoken critic of the State Peace and Development Council, which she says is understating the number of HIV and AIDS cases in Myanmar. She operates a clinic in Yangon that provides treatment, medicine and counseling to HIV and AIDS patients. The United States Department of State also called for Phyu Phyu Thin's release.

While in detention, Phyu Phyu Thin staged a hunger strike, taking only liquids for about one week. Her family, which had not been told where she was being held, said it would file a missing person's case with police.

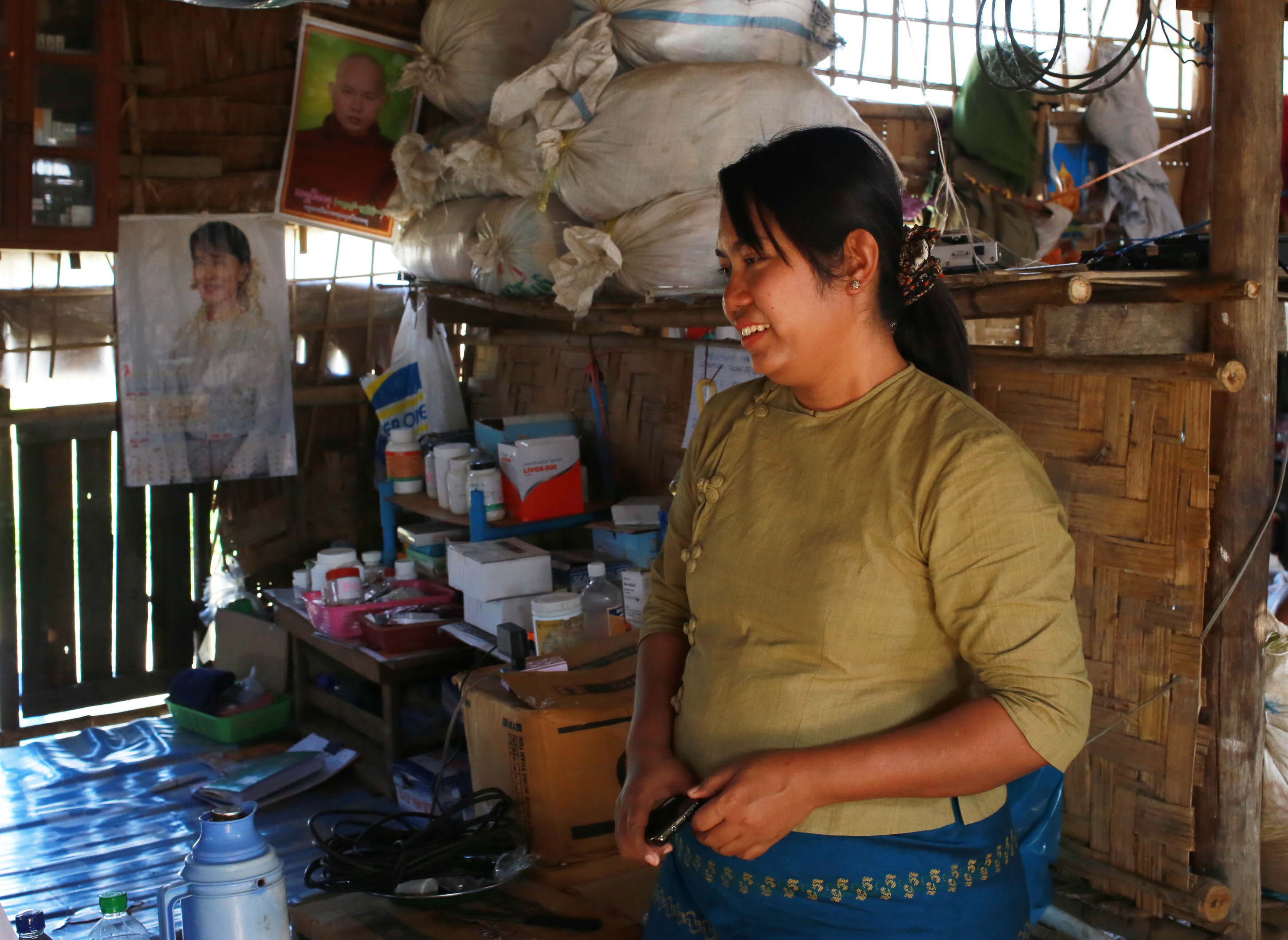
Phyu Phyu Thin visiting an HIV hospice.

Phyu Phyu Thin has previously been detained in 2000, after she and other Suu Kyi supporters were bundled away by police from a rally for Suu Kyi. She was held for a time in Insein prison.

== International recognition ==
In 2007, People in Need awarded Phyu Phyu Thin, along with fellow prisoners Su Su Nway and Nilar Thein, their Homo Homini Award.

== Political career ==
Phyu Phyu Thin was elected for a parliamentary seat in the lower house (Pyithu Hluttaw)'s Mingala Taungnyunt constituency, in 2012 by-elections. In the 2015 Myanmar general election, re-elect Pyithu Hluttaw MP for Mingala Taungnyunt Township.
