= Eurostep =

Eurostep (European Solidarity Towards Equal Participation of People) was a network of autonomous European non-governmental development organisations working towards peace, justice and equality in a world free of poverty. Its membership, rooted in their own societies, worked together to influence Europe's role in the world, particularly in pursuing the eradication of injustice and poverty.

The organization advocated changes in Europe's development policies and practice based on the perspectives drawn from direct experiences of an active involvement of its members and their partners in development in over 100 countries across the world.

Members of the network included NGOs such as Alliance Sud (Switzerland), ACSUR Las Segovias (Spain), CFSI (France), Concern (Ireland), Deutsche Welthungerhilfe (Germany), FDSC (Romania), KEPA (Finland), Hivos (The Netherlands), Mani Tese (Italy), Marie Stopes International (United Kingdom), Mellemfolkeligt Samvirke (Denmark), Network of East West Women (Poland), OIKOS (Portugal), Oxfam Novib (the Netherlands), People in Need (Czech Republic), Sloga (Slovenia), SNV (the Netherlands), Terre des hommes (Germany) and 11.11.11 (Belgium). Eurostep was a member of CONCORD, the European NGO Confederation for Relief and Development.

Founded in 1990 and based in Brussels, the organization was no longer in operation by August 2017, with a message on its website stating "Eurostep is no longer active under that name. The association has been transformed to being the European External Programme with Africa."

== See also ==
- ACP-EU Development Cooperation
- European Development Fund
