= Gheorghe Briceag =

- Born: April 15, 1928; Botoșani County, Kingdom of Romania
- Died: 16 August 2008 (aged 80); Bălți, Moldova
- Known for: Soviet dissident, human rights activist
- Awards: Homo Homini Award (2004)

Gheorghe Briceag (15 April 1928 – 16 August 2008) was a Moldovan human rights activist notable for his opposition to Soviet rule. In the 1940s, Briceag was given a ten-year sentence in the gulag for distributing anti-communist flyers; he was forced to work in coal mines for the length of his sentence. His prisoner number was "P169". After his release, he was sentenced to seven more years of exile. He later became a symbol of resistance to Soviet occupation of Moldova.

In 2004, Briceag won the Homo Homini Award of the Czech NGO People in Need, which recognizes "an individual who is deserving of significant recognition due to their promotion of human rights, democracy and non-violent solutions to political conflicts". The award citation described him as "a life-long activist for the defense of human rights and the defense of other former Gulag prisoners in Moldova". The following year, he served on the Rudolf Vrba Jury for People in Need's One World International Human Rights Documentary Film Festival, serving with fellow Homo Homini-winner Ales Bialacki.

The same year, Briceag created controversy by opposing the re-installation of a statue of Vladimir Lenin in his hometown of Bălți. Briceag threatened to burn the statue down personally if it were completed. The Supreme Court of Moldova ultimately overruled the Bălți City Council's decision to allow the statue.

Briceag also worked with Amnesty International and served as the Bălți coordinator of the Helsinki Committee for Human Rights.

Briceag was noted for his large "Solzhenitsyn-style" beard. A few months before his death, he pledged to shave it if Moldova united with Romania, a move Moldova's communist party opposed. He publicly requested that his body be donated to Chișinău's Nicolae Testemițanu State University of Medicine and Pharmacy following his death.
