= Leanid Sudalenka =

Belarusian human rights lawyer (1966-)

- Леанід Судаленка
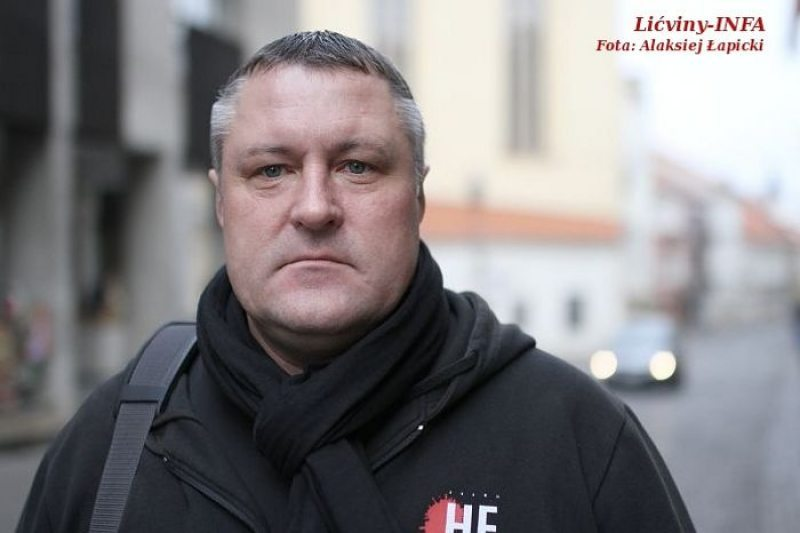
- Born: September 23, 1966 (age 59); Brahin District, Gomel Region, Byelorussian SSR
- Education: Francisk Skorina Gomel State University
- Occupation: Lawyer
- Known for: Human rights activism
- Awards: Homo Homini Award (2020)

Leanid Sudalenka (Belarusian: Леанід Леанідавіч Судаленка, romanized: Lieanid Lieanidavič Sudalienka; Russian: Леонид Леонидович Судаленко, romanized: Leonid Leonidovich Sudalenko; born 23 September 1966) is a Belarusian human rights activist and chairman of the Gomel branch of the human rights organisation Viasna. In January 2021, he was arrested for allegedly organising protests held in Gomel following the 2020 Belarusian presidential election; on 3 November 2021 he was sentenced to serve three years in a penal colony. A number of Belarusian and international human rights organisations have declared Sudalenka as being a prisoner of conscience, and in 2021 he was one of four Belarusian human rights activists to be jointly awarded the Homo Homini Award.

== Personal life ==
Sudalenka was born in the Brahin District of the Gomel Region of what was then the Byelorussian Soviet Socialist Republic. He graduated with a degree in law from Francisk Skorina Gomel State University. He is married with four children.

== Career ==
=== Legal career ===
Sudalenka worked for the natural gas infrastructure and transportation company Gazprom Transgaz Belarus until 2006, when his contract was not renewed after he publicly supported opposition presidential candidate Alyaksandr Milinkevich. Following this, he worked as a union leader in the independent Belarusian Radio-Electrical Manufacturing Workers' Trade Union. He also associated with Viasna and Belarusian Human Rights House and took on more human rights cases. Notably, in 2016 Sudalenka took part in a highly publicised case of a 13-year-old girl who was killed while harvesting potatoes at Vostok-Agro, a collective farm. While the court ruled in favour of the farm, it was also the first time a Belarusian court ordered large monetary compensation to a victim's family following a workplace incident, which was largely credited to Sudalenka. In 2018, in recognition of his human rights work, Sudalenka was awarded the Human Rights Prize of the French Republic.

=== 2020 presidential election and aftermath ===
In 2020 and 2021, Sudalenka took part in protests in Gomel following the 2020 presidential election, which was won by Alexander Lukashenko. In addition to attending, he also provided legal aid for protesters who were charged with attending unauthorised gatherings. On 18 January 2021 Sudalenka, alongside Maryia Tarasenka and Tatsiana Lasitsa, were arrested from Viasna's Gomel branch for breaching article 342 of Belarus' criminal code, "organisation and preparation of actions that grossly violate public order"; their offices were also searched. Later that month, Sudalenka was publicly described as a political prisoner in a joint statement issued by Viasna, the Belarusian Association of Journalists, the Belarusian Helsinki Committee and the Belarusian PEN Centre, alongside international organisations like Human Rights Watch, Amnesty International, the International Federation for Human Rights and the Law Society of England and Wales. On 17 September 2021, a social media campaign was launched using the hashtag "#FreeViasna' calling on the release of political prisoners including Sudalenka. German politician Konstantin von Notz took symbolic custody of Sudalenka, as part of Viasna's campaign in which European politicians acted as "godparents" for imprisoned Belarusian activists. Sudalenka and Lasitsa's trial started on 3 September 2021 in Tsentralny District Court in Gomel behind closed doors at the request of the judge, Sergei Solovki. Evidence cited by the prosecution included a Facebook posts where Sudalenka donated firewood to a protester's family; him taking part in a seminar on digital security for human rights activists; urging people to gather near a jail where an activist was imprisoned; and assisting with the payment of fines and legal fees, as well as providing legal advice, to protesters. On 3 November 2021, the court found Sudalenka guilty of organising and financing protests, and sentenced him to three years' imprisonment at penal colony no. 3 in Vitebsk Region. Sudalenka was released on 21 July 2023. Following his release, he went into self-imposed exile outside of Belarus.

In 2021, Sudalenka was awarded the Homo Homini Award alongside other imprisoned Viasna activists.

=== Subsequent charges ===
On 1 November 2023, the Investigative Committee of Gomel Region opened a new criminal case against Sudalenka, charging him with "facilitating extremist activity". On June 17, 2024, Sudalenko was sentenced in absentia to five years of prison and a fine for two parts of the criminal code article of "facilitating extremist activity".

== Personal life ==
Sudalenka is married with four children.
