= Mahienour El-Massry =

Egyptian human rights lawyer and political activist

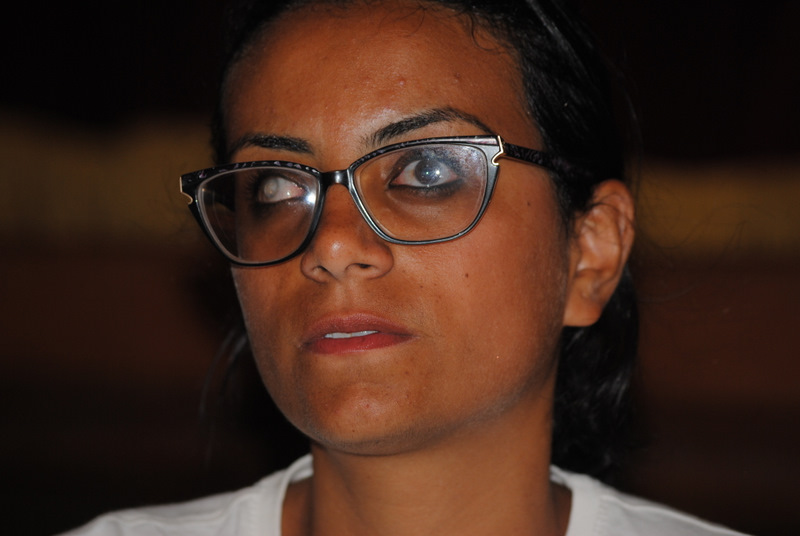
Mahienour El Masry, 2011

Mahienour El-Masry (Arabic: ماهينور المصري, born 7 January 1986 in Alexandria) is an Egyptian human rights lawyer and political activist from Alexandria, who has been engaged on the activist scene in the coastal city since the mid-2000s, and was arrested on 22 September 2019. El-Masry was released in July 2021.

== Human rights activism ==
El-Masry has been organizing peaceful protests and supports activities for political prisoners, using social media to denounce human rights violations. Often dubbed as a voice of the revolution and a champion of women's rights, her activism covers a wide range of activities, as an Alexandrian scholar and friend notes:

"There was not a single struggle that was off limits for Mahienour: human rights, student rights, women’s rights, labor strikes, legal aid, anti-police brutality, housing for the poor, corruption, anti-military trials, heritage preservation, right to the public space, state-led land reclamation from the poor, climate change, street children’s rights, Syrian refugees; the list goes on...Mahienour was always there, sleeping next to Syrian refugees in police stations to ensure they did not get tortured or deported, advocating for the twenty-one female supporters of the Brotherhood who were sentenced (and later acquitted) to eleven years in jail, and locating missing persons through the security labyrinth. Mahienour would rush to defend the victim's rights—regardless of affiliation—and attend the funeral of people she had never met. Her very presence sent a message that this issue really mattered and raised protestors’ morale."

El-Masry in January 2014 was sentenced to two years in prison for violating Egypt's controversial protest law before having her sentence reduced to six months. The young activist had participated in a protest on 3 December 2013 to call for justice and retribution for Khaled Saeed, the man who was tortured to death in June 2010 and later became one of the symbols of the Egyptian Revolution of 2011. She was released in September 2014, only to be sentenced on a different charge, in May 2015, when under the Morsi presidency, El-Masry and a group of lawyers started a sit-in in front of El-Raml police station in Alexandria, demanding an official apology from the Ministry of Interior regarding the injury of their fellow lawyer at the hands of police personnel. The lawyers were then arrested and accused of attempting to break into the police station. An acquittal hearing for El-Masry and her colleagues was made in December 2015 but was unsuccessful. She has been declared a prisoner of conscience by Amnesty International. On 22 September 2019, El-Masry was detained in Alexandria, she was faced with the charges of terrorism, releasing and spreading false rumours, and misuse of social media. El-Masry was held in pretrial detention at Al Qanater women's prison in the Menoufia governorate until she was eventually released on 18 July 2021. In 2016, El-Masry recounted her experience in Damanhour prison and Qanater prison. She narrated that:

"The prison cell was small, ranging between 4 to 6 meters [13 to 20 ft], accommodating 18 female prisoners. Our number reached 30 prisoners sometimes. We had one bathroom, and our stuffs were hung to a nail inside the room. There were no beds in Damanhour prison, unlike the Qanater prison. The design of the political prisoners’ cell, which I entered along with others the second time, was very similar to al-Aqrab prison’s cells. They have no ventilation and water cuts were ongoing."

== Awards ==
In June 2014, El-Masry was awarded the Ludovic Trarieux International Human Rights Prize, an international honour given annually to a lawyer for contributions to the defence of human rights. She was the second person to be awarded the international award while in prison since Nelson Mandela in 1985.

She was also named a finalist for the Aurora Humanitarians Prize 2022, which she could not attend because the Egyptian authorities banned her from travelling.
