= Buzurgmehr Yorov =

Tajik human rights lawyer

Buzurgmehr Yorov (Russian: Бузургмехр Ёров, Tajik: Бузургмеҳр Ёров; 9 July 1971) is a Tajik human rights lawyer and member of the opposition Social Democratic Party of Tajikistan. Throughout the 2000s, serving as the head of the legal firm Sipar, Yorov was involved in a number of high-profile legal cases, representing individuals prosecuted by the government of Tajikistan on charges deemed politically motivated. In 2011, he represented prominent religious figure and former senator Hoji Akbar Turajonzoda when the latter sued the head of the state-backed Council of Ulems (Islamic scholars) for defamation. The case occurred amidst a government-led crackdown against the Turajonzoda brothers who frequently criticized the state religion policy. In 2013, Yorov represented Muhiddin Kabiri, the leader of the Islamic Revival Party and member of the country's parliament who had been sued by the Dushanbe Mayor's Office for criticizing the practice of massive cutting of trees in the capital. In 2014, Yorov represented Fakhriddin Zokirov, another Tajik lawyer who had been arrested on forgery charges, apparently as a retaliation for representing Zayd Saidov, a businessman and politician. He also offered to represent Alexander Sodiqov, a Canada-based PhD student who had been detained by the authorities and charged with spying and treason while conducting research in Tajikistan in June 2014. Sodiqov's family declined the offer, fearing that the outspoken lawyer's affiliation with an opposition party might politicize the case.

== Arrest and International Reaction ==
Following the ban on the Islamic Revival Party (IRPT) in Tajikistan, its designation as a terrorist organization, and the detention of some 200 of its members in September 2015, Buzurgmehr Yorov took on representing several high-ranking members of the party who were arrested on a number of charges, including terrorism, arousing religious hostility sabotage, etc. On September 28, 2015, gave an interview to a local news agency, alleging that one of the arrested IPRT members he represented had been tortured in pretrial detention. He also alleged that the authorities had been planting weapons and IEDs on lower level IRPT members detained throughout the country. Finally, he announced that he had set up a committee for the defense of the arrested IRPT members. Later that day, officers from the Police Unit for Combating Organized Crime (UBOP) arrived in the office of the legal firm Sipar, seized documents related to Yorov's representation of the arrested IRPT members, and took the lawyer away for questioning. On September 29, 2015, Tajikistan's Ministry of Internal Affairs (MIA) announced that Yorov was detained on charges of swindling and fraud allegedly dating back to 2010.

On October 2, 2015, the spokesperson for the UN High Commissioner for Human Rights expressed concern about an "increasing risk of human rights violations" in Tajikistan connected to the legal prosecution of IRPT members and the lawyers who represented them. The committee for the defense of the arrested IRPT members that Yorov had set up disbanded soon after his detention. Sipar, the legal firm that Yorov had headed, also disbanded. On October 7, six human rights groups (including Amnesty International, the Paris Bar, Association for Human Rights in Central Asia, Human Rights Watch, the International Partnership for Human Rights (IPHR), and the Norwegian Helsinki Committee) issued a statement demanding that the authorities in Tajikistan release Yorov or present "internationally recognizable charges" against him. The statement also alleged that the lawyer had been detained on "trumped-up" charges and as a punishment for providing legal counsel to the arrested IRPT members. Facing a wave of international condemnation and media interest in the case, the authorities classified Yorov's case as "top secret" on October 14.

A number of other human rights groups and bar associations around the world condemned the detention of Buzurgmehr Yorov, including the International Commission of Jurists (ICJ), Law Society of Upper Canada (LSUC), UK-based Law Society, and the Netherlands-based Lawyers for Lawyers (L4L).

In December 2015, authorities added three new charges against Buzurgmehr Yorov, including creating an extremist group, public propagation of extremist ideas, and inciting national, racial, or religious hostility. Each of these charges carries a sentence of three to eight years in prison. The lawyer's relatives who were allowed to visit him in detention said he had denied all charges brought against him.

== Trial ==
On May 3, 2016, the trial against Yorov and another lawyer, Nuriddin Makhkamov, opened in Dushanbe's Ferdowsi District Court. The trial was closed to the public, and journalists as well as representatives of diplomatic missions and the Organization for Security and Co-operation in Europe (OSCE) were not allowed to attend. According to a local news agency which spoke to several individuals who had attended the trial, Yorov refused the services of his state-appointed lawyer, suggesting that the latter had not been given sufficient time to prepare for trial. Yorov also reportedly requested that the presiding judge be disqualified and a new judge be appointed. Finally, he announced that several key testimonies that he and supporting witnesses had made during the course of the investigation were missing from court materials.

Local journalists and representatives from the US Embassy in Dushanbe and OSCE were allowed to attend the second session of the trial against Yorov and Makhkamov on May 10. During the session, Yorov requested that the trial be held in a local theater or aired live on national television, alluding apparently to what he believed was a farcical nature of the trial. During the third session of the trial, on May 13, Yorov requested that all the 18 persons who testified against him appeared on trial.
