= Francisca Ramírez =

Nicaraguan farmer and activist

Francisca Ramírez Tórrez
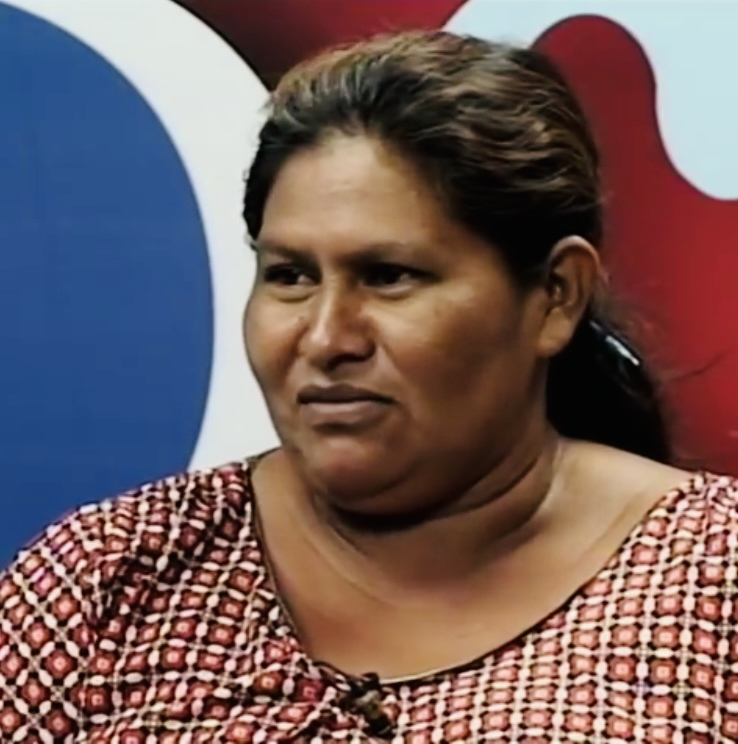
- Ramírez in 2016
- Born: 1977 (age 48–49)
- Citizenship: Nicaragua
- Occupations: Farmer, activist
- Organization(s): National Council for the Defense of the Land, Lake and Sovereignty
- Movement: Peasants rights

Francisca Ramírez Tórrez (also known as Doña Francisca or Doña Chica, born 1977) is a Nicaraguan farmer and peasants (campesinos) rights activist. She has been a leader of protests that began in 2014 against the proposed development of an inter-oceanic canal through Nicaragua and for the repeal of the 2013 legislation (Law 840) granting Chinese company HKND the concession for the canal and other infrastructure projects.

== Early life ==
Francisca Ramírez Tórrez was born in 1977 in a small rural community then known as Somoza in Nueva Guinea on the Caribbean coast of Nicaragua (following the revolution, Somoza was renamed La Fonseca in 1979 in honor of Sandinista leader Carlos Fonseca.) Ramírez's family was originally from the Pacific coast of Nicaragua but had been displaced in the 1950s in a Somozas regime program of relocating farmers with small orchards in the region to make way for burgeoning cotton crops. These farmers, including Ramírez's family, were moved to so-called "colonies" on the Caribbean coast, at the time virgin forest.

Ramírez's parents had five children, but her father left during the war when she was seven years old, after which she was charged with helping her mother raise her siblings. She left school after the third grade and at 12 she began traveling to Managua to sell crops for local farmers.

== Activism ==
Ramírez now owns her own land in La Fonseca, as well as a small fleet of trucks with which she and her husband and children transport crops. Like her neighbors in the rural community, Ramírez's family is economically dependent on the land they farm and became alarmed when Chinese surveyors arrived without notice to begin measuring their land for canal development. Ramírez began organizing a response when she learned they were at risk of being displaced by the land expropriation Law 840 authorized in granting Chinese company HKND the concession for the proposed inter-oceanic canal and other infrastructure projects.

As part of this organizing, Ramírez served as head of the environmental and peasants rights organization, the National Council for the Defense of the Land, Lake and Sovereignty (Consejo Nacional para la Defensa de la Tierra, Lago y Soberanía). Per its bylaws, the Council for the Defense of the Land functions as a non-partisan and self-mobilized grassroots movement, independent of political party or NGO affiliation, and Ramírez personally does not belong to a political party; she has refused offers of office in exchange for joining a party. She has also declined to participate in closed-door meetings with President Daniel Ortega, and turned down high-priced buyouts for her land offered in exchange for ceasing her activism.

On December 1, 2016, Nicaraguan National Police seized two of Ramírez's work vehicles and released them on December 10, 2016. While the police held her vehicles, the windows of them were broken.

In the April 2018 protests in Nicaragua, Ramírez with other leaders of the peasants movement issued a statement of support for the youth and self-organized grassroots protesters and called for a general strike.

== Recognition ==
In 2016, Forbes Mexico named Ramírez one of the 50 most powerful women in Central America.

In 2017, Ramírez was a runner up for the Front Line Defenders award for human rights defenders.

== See also ==
- Berta Cáceres - Honduran environmental activist
