= Khadija Ismayilova =

Azerbaijani investigative journalist and radio host (born 1976)

- Xədicə İsmayılova
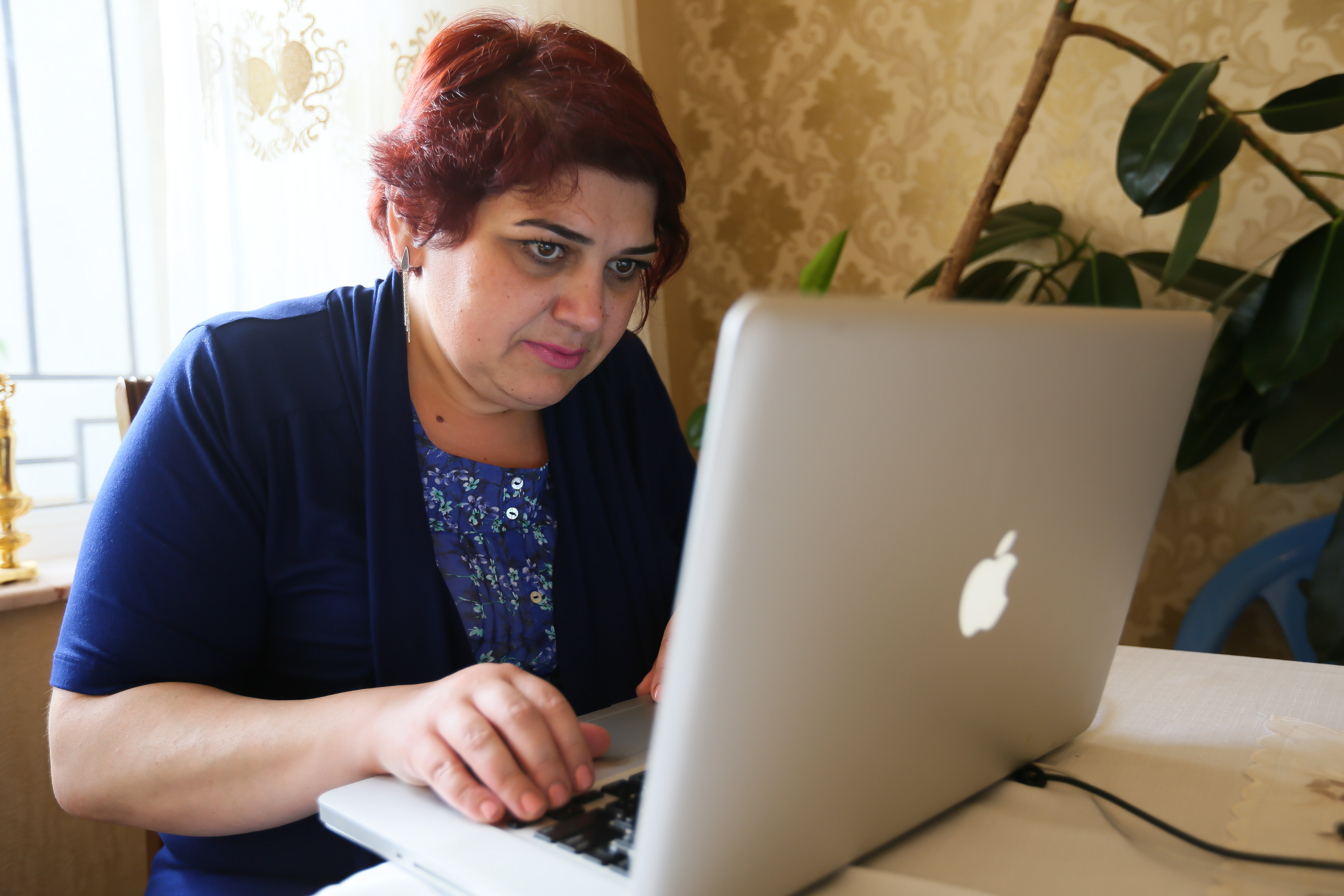
- Ismayilova in 2016
- Born: 27 May 1976 (age 50); Baku, Azerbaijan SSR, Soviet Union
- Awards: Right Livelihood Award

Khadija Rovshan gizi Ismayilova (Azerbaijani: Xədicə Rövşən qızı İsmayılova, pronounced [xædiːˈdʒæ ismɑˈjɯlovɑ]; born 27 May 1976), alternatively spelled Ismailova, is an Azerbaijani investigative journalist and radio host who is currently working for the Azerbaijani service of Radio Free Europe/Radio Liberty, until recently as the host of the daily debate show İşdən Sonra. She is a member of the Organized Crime and Corruption Reporting Project.

Ismayilova has been targeted by Ilham Aliyev's authoritarian regime in Azerbaijan for her reporting on financial corruption among Azerbaijan's ruling elite. In December 2014, Ismayilova was arrested on charges of incitement to suicide, a charge widely criticized by human rights organizations as ludicrous. On 1 September 2015, Ismayilova was sentenced to seven and a half years in prison under charges of embezzlement and tax evasion. On 25 May 2016, the Azerbaijani supreme court ordered Ismayilova released on probation. In December 2017, Ismayilova received the Right Livelihood Award, often referred to as "Alternative Nobel Prize", "for her courage and tenacity in exposing corruption at the highest levels of government through outstanding investigative journalism in the name of transparency and accountability." Ismayilova was not allowed to travel from Azerbaijan to Sweden to receive the award.

== Early life and education ==
Khadija Ismayilova was born in Baku. She has stated that she experienced a happy childhood, learning to swim in the Caspian Sea. She grew up during the Cold War and experienced the national liberation during her youth, culminating in war. She attended Baku School #135 and graduated in 1992, when Azerbaijan became independent of the Soviet Union. She graduated from the Baku State University with a degree in philology in 1997.

== Career ==
From 1997 to 2007, she worked as a journalist for a number of local and foreign media outlets, including the newspaper Zerkalo, Caspian Business News and the Azerbaijani edition of the Voice of America. She has stated that the murder of Elmar Huseynov, an engineer turned journalist who "was the first to report on state corruption" was a turning point in her life.

=== Investigative reporting ===
From 2008 to 2010, Ismayilova was the head of the Azerbaijani service of Radio Free Europe/Radio Liberty, after which she continued working there as a regular staff reporter. Beginning in 2010, a series of her articles dealing with state-level corruption in Azerbaijan caused great controversy as they explicitly named Azerbaijan's current President Ilham Aliyev, his wife Mehriban Aliyeva and their children as engaging in corruption. The government never issued a comment regarding any of these reports. Two of these articles were named the best investigative reports of 2010 and 2011 by Radio Free Europe/Radio Liberty.

Azerbaijan's media is strictly controlled by the government. Thus, this sort of investigative reporting is highly unusual.

Following the March 2010 publication of a Washington Post article, which used Ismayilova's work as background information, that the eleven-year-old son of Azerbaijan's President Ilham Aliyev owned real estate in the United Arab Emirates worth 44 million USD, Ismayilova co-published an article based on her investigation which shed light on the business activity of other members of the President's family and the family's close circle of friends. The article specifically described Ilham Aliyev's younger daughter Arzu Aliyeva's activities, as she reportedly owned a bank that had never been privatised since its establishment. Arzu Aliyeva was also reported a co-owner of a holding which had been winning unannounced tenders and seized control of all profitable services of Azerbaijan Airlines, such as airport taxi, duty-free, on-board catering, and airplane technical support, without any transparent financial reporting.

In June 2011, Ismayilova's next controversial publication revealed the names of offshore companies which had been registered in the names of Aliyev's daughters. This report also alleged that the Aliyev daughters owned one of the mobile operators and the 3G monopolist of Azerbaijan. It also claimed that the mobile operator had been falsely naming Siemens as its legal owner in order to be able to participate in state tenders to evade the Azerbaijani law not allowing newly registered companies to do so.

In May 2012, an investigative report co-authored by Ismayilova, alleged that the AIMROC consortium in charge of extracting gold and silver worth US$2.5 billion from the Chovdar mine was owned by three Panamanian companies (different from the ones mentioned in the previous report), with the wife and daughters of the president as their senior managers. The president's office refused to comment on the matter.

On 12 June 2012, the National Assembly of Azerbaijan adopted amendments to three laws, stipulating that from then on, information on the ownership of companies, including names and share of the owners, could only be released either on court orders or as part of a police investigation, on the orders of a financial monitoring agency, or by consent of the company owner only. According to Azerireport, this was the government's response to Khadija Ismayilova's journalist investigations, which brought the corruption of the Azerbaijani government to public attention. Opposition member Ilgar Mammadov also linked the adoption of the amendments to the corruption scandal caused by the reports and said it would turn Azerbaijan itself into a corruption-friendly offshore zone. It is noteworthy that almost simultaneously, on 13 June 2012, the National Assembly passed a law granting all ex-Presidents and ex-First Ladies lifelong legal immunity.

In October 2012, Ismayilova and two Czech journalists authored another investigative report, part of the Organized Crime and Corruption Reporting Project, writing that high-ranking officials of Azerbaijan and their family members had companies registered in their names in the Czech Republic and through those companies owned luxury real estate in Karlovy Vary. Arzu Aliyeva (who reportedly owns a one-million-dollar villa), Ilham Aliyev's father-in-law Arif Pashayev, Sheikh ul-Islam of the Caucasus Allahshukur Pashazadeh, his brother Member of Parliament Javanshir Pashazadeh, Member of Parliament Adil Aliyev and the latter's brother Allahverdi Aliyev were mentioned among Azerbaijani company owners in the Czech Republic who in turn owned property there. According to a Freedom House report, Azerbaijani law prohibits government officials, including the president, from owning businesses, but there are no such restrictions on family members. In the report, Ismayilova quoted Vasif Movsumov, executive director of the Baku-based Anti-Corruption Foundation, as saying the ownership of the said companies by Parliament Members is a violation of law.

=== Opinions and views ===
In a 2011 interview to Gunaz TV, Khadija Ismayilova said she believed that Islamists affiliated with Iran's intelligence were directly responsible for the assassination of publicist Rafiq Tağı.

Ismayilova condemned the murder of Gurgen Margaryan by Azerbaijani officer Ramil Safarov by calling it an "awful act" and said, unlike some, she did not consider him a hero. In August 2012, she mentioned on her Facebook account that the warm welcome Safarov had received in Azerbaijan after being extradited and pardoned stemmed from the fact that "the people of Azerbaijan lost the war, lost the territory to occupants, became refugees, lost their siblings including civilians, and they were stopped and banned from restoring justice on the battlefield". She also criticised President Aliyev for not exercising his right to pardon a convicted criminal in the proper manner, which made Azerbaijan an easy target of criticism by the international community.

In August 2013, while commenting on the release of the list of people declared personae non gratae in Azerbaijan for visiting the region of Nagorno-Karabakh, Ismailyova noted that some of the people whose names appear on the list, especially those for whom no reason for the ban has been listed, are in fact journalists and human rights activists who apparently were barred from entering Azerbaijan for criticising the Azerbaijani government in their articles, as it is not evident if they have ever visited Nagorno-Karabakh.

When talking about her position on the Nagorno-Karabakh conflict, Ismayilova said a 2022 interview to the German magazine zenith that despite her criticism of Ilham Aliyev's rule and her collecting signatures for a petition to solve crimes committed by the Azerbaijani army during the Second Karabakh War, she held Armenia responsible for keeping Azerbaijani territory under occupation in violation of international law. She stressed that the conflict started "long before Aliyev came to power" and that the voices of the 600,000 Azerbaijanis turned into refugees during the First Karabakh War needed to be heard as well. According to Ismayilova, the Nagorno-Karabakh conflict is not about democracy or corruption, but about Russia fueling it so it can maintain its influence on its periphery. She regretted having lost the support of some of her friends in the West for her stance but maintained that her freedom of speech should not be limited to her criticism of Aliyev and his government.

=== 2012 sex tape and blackmail ===
On 7 March 2012, Ismayilova received what appeared to be snapshots of a footage from a camera hidden in her bedroom, capturing her engaged in sexual intercourse with her boyfriend. Attached was a letter containing threats of "public humiliation", if Ismayilova did not "behave". Similar snapshots were received by her boyfriend, some relatives and a number of opposition media outlets.

Ismayilova publicly refused to give in to the blackmailers. On 14 March, the original footage of the intercourse scene was posted on a website posing as the website of the opposition party Musavat. The party officials stated the website did not represent them and condemned the act. Ismayilova blamed the government, primarily the Presidential Administration, for ordering her sex-taped and launching a smear campaign to retaliate for her investigative activity. Ismayilova submitted a report to the Attorney General's Office on the day after receiving the snapshots, but the office did not start an investigation until after the video was publicised.

Numerous local and international organizations showed their support for Ismayilova and condemned attempts to blackmail her, among them the Institute for Media Rights (Azerbaijan), Institute for Reporters' Freedom and Safety (Azerbaijan), Amnesty International, Committee to Protect Journalists, Association of Women Journalists (Azerbaijan), the local Helsinki Committee for Human Rights and others. In her letter to President Ilham Aliyev, OSCE Representative on Freedom of the Media Dunja Mijatović insisted that those responsible for the blackmail be identified and prosecuted.

In April 2012, British pop singer Sandie Shaw joined an Amnesty International campaign to end human rights abuses in Azerbaijan. Shaw stated on behalf of Ismayilova's case: "That anyone would stoop so low in an attempt to silence an independent journalist is sickening. The people behind this appalling blackmail and smear campaign must be brought to justice. And the persecution of independent journalists in Azerbaijan must stop."

On 26 April 2012, the Attorney General's office released the names of all those who lived or visited the apartment where the sex-taping took place. Ismayilova criticised this act, saying that instead of carrying out an investigation, the Attorney General's office is echoing the blackmailers in intervening in her personal life by doing this.

Meanwhile, Ismayilova carried out her own personal investigation. She claimed that the stamp shown on the letter containing the snapshots and supposedly sent from Moscow was fake. In addition, according to her, a neighbourhood maintenance worker said that an additional telephone line had been installed in her apartment in July 2011 by technicians from the telephone exchange. The telephone exchange, in turn, said the technicians acted on the orders of the Ministry of National Security which owns an office there that the exchange has no control of. Ismayilova added that in July 2011, she had been abroad and that according to the maintenance worker, an unidentified man had met him at the door claiming to be the owner of the apartment.

While the official investigation is currently in progress, similar footage of Ismayilova, recorded at a different time, was published on a different website on 26 July 2013, accompanied by a comment attributed to blogger Emin Milli in which he allegedly said that "the videos featuring Khadija Ismayilova have done serious damage to the general democratic movement". Emin Milli denied making that statement and referred to it as "blatant provocation". On 2 August 2013, a group of journalists initiated a silent walking protest supporting Ismayilova. Thirty of them were detained and later released.

A number of international human rights organisations signed a collective letter addressed to President Ilham Aliyev and Attorney General Zakir Garalov, calling on them to ensure proper investigation to put an end to the ongoing smear campaign against Khadija Ismayilova and have its perpetrators punished. The letter was signed by ARTICLE 19, Civil Rights Defenders, Human Rights House Foundation, Human Rights Watch, International Media Support, Media Diversity Institute, Norwegian Helsinki Committee, Open Society Foundations, PEN International, People in Need Organisation, Reporters Without Borders.

=== 2013 arrest and community service ===
On 26 January 2013, Khadija Ismayilova was among dozens of peaceful protesters who were detained for participating in an unsanctioned protest action in Baku in support of the Ismayilli rioters. She refused to pay the 500 AZN fine, claiming she had not violated the law. Instead, in June 2013, the Binagadi District Court sentenced her to 220 hours of community service, namely sweeping the streets. Ismayilova said she was pleased with the verdict, as "clearing this country of rubbish" is something she is used to. However, soon afterwards, many of Ismayilova's supporters expressed their wish to join her in sweeping the streets. Immediately, the executive power of the district ceased the service, saying they would replace the sweeping option with indoor service. On 15 August 2013, the Binagadi Court of Appeal upheld the previous decision, after which Ismayilova stated she would only perform community service in public, out of fear for her safety.

=== 2014 harassment ===
An article published on 13 February 2014 on a pro-government website accused Ismayilova of passing along information discrediting members of Azerbaijan's political opposition to two U.S. congressional staffers who were in Baku, allegedly to gather intelligence.

On 14 February 2014, Ismayilova posted a scan to her Facebook page that appears to be a contract used by the Ministry of National Security to hire an informer. On 18 February and 19 February and 20 February 2014, the prosecutor's office called her in for disseminating secret documents.

In September 2014, a campaign began claiming that Ismayilova worked with Armenians to organize a protest at the Warsaw OSCE Summit. Ismayilova was notified that the authorities would be waiting for her to return to Baku on October 3, and while she was detained for five hours, with a focus on a camera SD card possibly containing documents against the state, later found empty, she was not arrested. Soon after, a lawsuit was filed against Ismayilova, charging her with criminal defamation and insult, based on the 14 February document noted above.

=== 2014 arrest and trial ===
In February 2014, Ismayilova posted a list of requests to her supporters in case of her arrest and made a video in October 2014 discussing why she believed that she would be arrested.

On 5 December 2014, Ismayilova was arrested. She was summoned to appear in the Sabayil District court in Baku on 5 December, accused of provoking a man to attempt suicide. She was sentenced to two months of pre-trial detention on the charge of Article 125 of the Criminal Code, accused of inciting her former colleague Tural Mustafayev to suicide, facing a prison sentence of three to seven years if convicted. Some note that her arrest came one day after the head of the Presidential Administration of Azerbaijan Republic, Ramiz Mehdiyev published a manifesto in which Ismayilova was named "the best example" of journalists working against the government. "She puts on anti-Azerbaijani shows, makes absurd statements, openly demonstrates a destructive attitude towards well-known members of the Azerbaijani community, and spreads insulting lies" and accused Ismayilova of treason.

In February 2015, Ismayilova was additionally charged with tax evasion and abuse of power. According to Reporters Without Borders, Ismayilova's lawyer, Fariz Namazly, said the authorities were trying to compensate for the flimsiness of the initial charges brought against her. The new charges are the boilerplate in nature, inasmuch as human rights defenders such as Intigam Aliyev, Rasul Jafarov and Anar Mammadli are being held on similar ones.

In April 2015, Tural Mustafayev, who had been allegedly incited to suicide by Ismayilova, revealed in an interview that he no longer wished to pursue a case against Ismayilova. He stated that beginning in December 2014, he had contacted the Office of the Attorney General asking to withdraw his original complaint, which he had filed while "going through psychologically difficult times". He denied being pressured by a third party into filing it, but did briefly mention that he was "detained" back in December soon after leaving a message on his Facebook page in which he expressed his intent to withdraw the complaint. Mustafayev's request was ignored, and he refused to comment on the reasons for this refusal.

In September 2015, Khadija Ismayilova was found guilty on the counts of tax evasion and abuse of power, but acquitted on the count of inciting to suicide. She was sentenced to 7.5 years in prison. She had previously filed a case with the European Court of Human Rights stating that she had been held in prison beyond the pre-trial detention of two months following her December 2014 arrest. In January 2016, Amal Clooney announced that she would like to represent Ismayilova at the European Court of Human Rights. Ismayilova accepted the proposal.

Ismayilova's arrest was condemned by the OSCE Representative on Freedom of the Media Dunja Mijatović, Reporters Without Borders, the Parliamentary Assembly of the Council of Europe President Anne Brasseur, the Broadcasting Board of Governors, the U.S. Department of State, Amnesty International, the Organized Crime and Corruption Reporting Project, Human Rights Watch, Freedom House, the Human Rights House Foundation, Index on Censorship, The Committee to Protect Journalists, the Civil Rights Defenders, the International Women's Media Foundation, the Civic Solidarity Platform, the International Press Institute, the European Union, the Global Investigative Journalism Network, and the Council of Europe Commissioner for Human Rights.

=== 2015 sentence and travel ban ===
In December 2014, Ismayilova was detained and in September 2015, she was sentenced to seven and a half years in prison on trumped-up charges. She was conditionally released in May 2016, but as of January 2020, she remained subject to a travel ban, unable to leave the country despite numerous applications to do so. Lawyers sought permission for her to travel to the UK to give evidence in the trial of Paul Radu, a Romanian journalist, co-founder and executive director of the investigative reporting group Organized Crime and Corruption Reporting Project (OCCRP). Radu was sued for defamation in London by an Azerbaijani MP, Javanshir Feyziyev, over two articles in OCCRP's award-winning Azerbaijan Laundromat series about money-laundering out of Azerbaijan. Ismayilova, OCCRP's lead reporter in Azerbaijan, is a key witness in the case.

=== Toplum TV ===
Ismayilova became the editor-in-chief of Toplum TV, an independent online news platform. On 6 March 2024, Azerbaijani authorities searched Toplum's offices in Baku and detained six members of staff on charges of smuggling; Toplum's YouTube and Instagram accounts were also wiped. Ismayilova said in a statement that the charges were false, a sentiment echoed by international human rights organisations including Human Rights Watch.

== 2020 Nagorno-Karabakh War ==
According to peer-reviewed journal Caucasus Survey, due to the 2020 Nagorno-Karabakh War, the authoritarian Azerbaijani leadership has garnered high degrees of social solidarity for the first time since the dissolution of the Soviet Union in 1991—including from its "most vicious critics". Ismayilova, within this context, appealed to the civil society actors of Azerbaijan through her personal Facebook page and wrote: "Any attempt to sanction the Azerbaijani government or Turkey in relation to the war in Karabakh should be strongly condemned by Azerbaijani civil society".

== Personal life ==
Ismayilova is an outspoken atheist.

Her mother became ill with cancer, went to Ankara for treatment and died there; Ismayilova could not visit due to the travel ban.

== Awards ==
- 2012 (24 May) - Gerd Bucerius Free Press of Eastern Europe Award by Zeit-Stiftung in Hamburg, Germany. For her dedication to independent media and freedom of speech.
- 2012 (24 October) - Courage in Journalism Award by the Washington-based International Women's Media Foundation. Presented in New York City and in Los Angeles.
- 2013 (14 October) - Global Shining Light Award, Rio de Janeiro, Brazil to Khadija and her Azerbaijani and Czech colleagues for report exposing "questionable business dealings" involving the family of Azerbaijani President Ilham Aliyev.
- 2015 (May) - PEN/Barbara Goldsmith Freedom to Write Award, New York City. Awarded while Khadija was in prison.
- 2015 - Anna Politkovskaya Award. For her reporting on corruption.
- 2015 (August) - Alison Des Forges Award for Extraordinary Activism from Human Rights Watch.
- 2016 (April) - UNESCO/Guillermo Cano World Press Freedom Prize.
- 2016 (November) - BBC's 100 Women.
- 2017 (26 September) - Right Livelihood Award, often referred to as "Alternative Nobel Prize", Stockholm, Sweden. Khadija was not allowed to travel from Azerbaijan to Sweden to receive the award on 23 November 2017.
- 2017 (28 September) - Allard Prize for International Integrity, Peter A. Allard School of Law at the University of British Columbia, Canada. Keynote speaker at Awards Ceremony: Glenn Greenwald.
- 2020 (8 October) - Preis für die Freiheit und Zukunft der Medien of Media Foundation of Sparkasse Leipzig. Khadija Ismayilova was not allowed to travel from Azerbaijan to Germany to receive her award.

== See also ==
- Caviar diplomacy
- Ilgar Mammadov
- Emin Milli
- Leyla Yunus
