= Andrei Sakharov Freedom Award =

Award established in 1980 by the Norwegian Helsinki Committee

- Presented by: Norwegian Helsinki Committee
- First award: 1980
- Website: nhc.no/en

The Andrei Sakharov Freedom Award, officially known as the Sakharov Freedom Award and named after Soviet scientist and dissident Andrei Sakharov, was established in 1980 by the Norwegian Helsinki Committee with the support and consent of Andrei Sakharov himself, to help people who, because of their opinions, beliefs, and conscience are persecuted or imprisoned. The fund's assets are to be used for direct support to those persecuted in their home country, mainly by granting the Sakharov Freedom Award.

== Laureates ==
Year	Recipient	Nationality	Notes	Reference
1984	Charta 77	ČSSR		
1996	Sergei Kovalev of the Memorial Human Rights Center	Russian	human rights defender	
2002	Eliza Musaeva of the Memorial Human Rights Center	Russian	human rights defender	
2002	Amor Mašović of the Commission on Missing Persons	Bosnian		
2006	Ales Bialiatski of the Human Rights Center "Viasna"	Belarusian	human rights defender	
2007	Svetlana Gannushkina of the Memorial Human Rights Center	Russian	human rights defender	
2010	Evgeniy Zhovtis of the Kazakhstan International Bureau for Human Rights and Rule of Law	Kazakhstani	human rights defender	
2012	Lilia Shibanova of the Golos	Russian	election monitoring organization	
2014	Rasul Jafarov, Leyla Yunus, Anar Mammadli and Intiqam Aliyev	Azerbaijani	human rights activists, political prisoners	
2017	the newspaper Novaya Gazeta and the organization Committee for the Prevention of Torture	Russian	anti-torture fighters	
2019	Hungarian Helsinki Committee	Hungary	human rights organization	
2021	Yury A. Dmitriev	Russian	historian and dissident	
2023	Truth Hounds	Ukraine	Human rights organisation	

== See also ==
- Sakharov Prize
