= Michael McFaul =

American political scientist, author, and diplomat (born 1963)

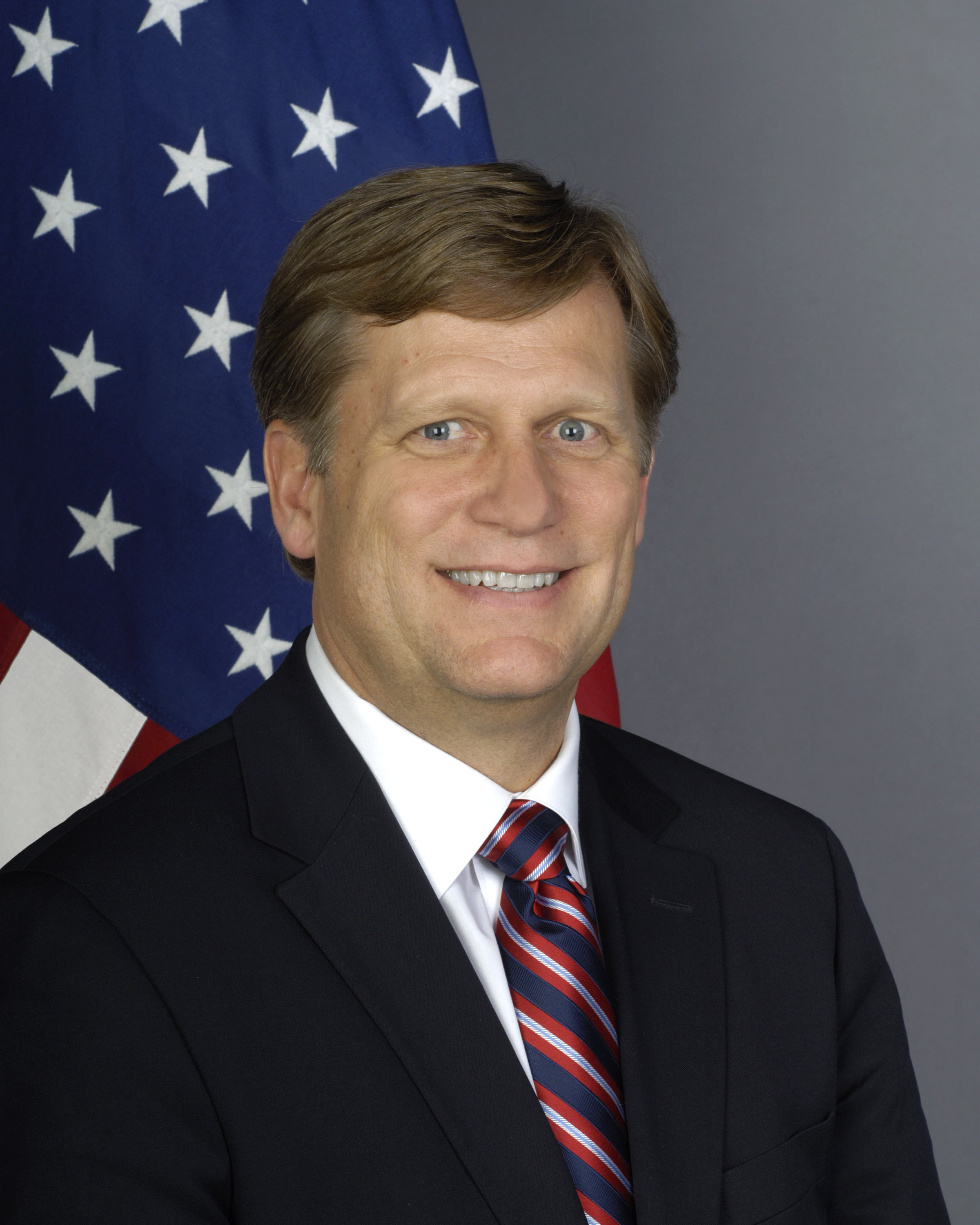
- Official portrait, 2011

7th United States Ambassador to Russia
- In office January 10, 2012 – February 26, 2014
- President: Barack Obama
- Preceded by: John Beyrle
- Succeeded by: John F. Tefft

Personal details
- Born: Michael Anthony McFaul; October 1, 1963 (age 63) Glasgow, Montana, U.S.
- Party: Democratic
- Spouse: Donna Norton (m. 1993)
- Children: 2
- Education: Stanford University (BA, MA); St John's College, Oxford (DPhil)

Michael Anthony McFaul (born October 1, 1963) is an American academic and diplomat who served as the United States ambassador to Russia from 2012 to 2014. McFaul became the Ken Olivier and Angela Nomellini Professor in International Studies in the Department of Political Science at Stanford University in 1995, where he is the Director of the Freeman Spogli Institute for International Studies. He is also a Peter and Helen Bing Senior Fellow at the Hoover Institution. He is also a contributing columnist at The Washington Post. Prior to his nomination to the ambassadorial position, McFaul worked for the U.S. National Security Council as Special Assistant to the President and senior director of Russian and Eurasian affairs, where he was the architect of U.S. President Barack Obama's Russian reset policy.

== Early life and education ==
Born in Glasgow, Montana, McFaul was raised in Butte and Bozeman, where his father worked as a musician and music teacher. While attending Bozeman High School, McFaul participated in policy debate; his partner was future U.S. Senator Steve Daines.

While an undergraduate at Stanford University he spent time in the Soviet Union, first in the summer of 1983 studying Russian at the Leningrad State University (now Saint Petersburg State University), and then a semester in 1985 at Pushkin Institute in Moscow. He earned a B.A. in international relations and Slavic languages and an M.A. in Russian and East European Studies from Stanford in 1986. As a Rhodes Scholar, he earned a DPhil in international relations from St John's College, Oxford, in 1991. He wrote his dissertation on U.S. and Soviet intervention in revolutionary movements in southern Africa.

McFaul received an honorary doctorate from Montana State University during the university's fall commencement in 2015.

== Career ==
In 1994, McFaul and one-time close friend and colleague Sergey Markov helped found the Moscow Carnegie Center.

McFaul's past engagement with Russian political figures included a denunciation of him in 1994 by Vladimir Zhirinovsky, leader of the Liberal Democratic Party and a member of the State Duma (the Russian parliament), and a subsequent shooting incident in which a shot was fired into McFaul's office window in Moscow. Two years later, Alexander Korzhakov, a confidante of Russian president Boris Yeltsin, invited McFaul to the Kremlin during the 1996 Russian presidential election, because of McFaul's research on electoral politics.

=== Professor of political science ===
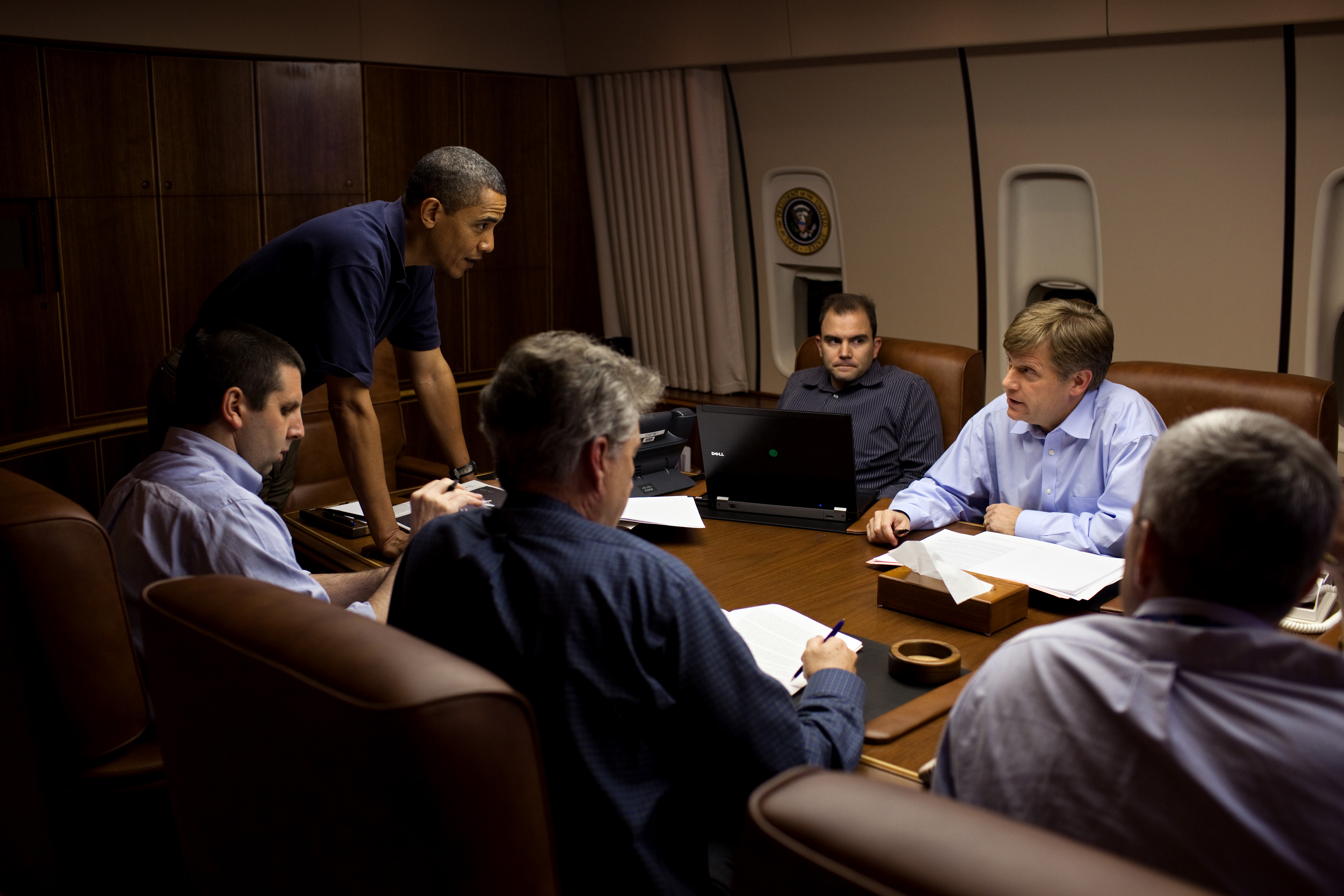
President Barack Obama is briefed during a flight to Moscow, 2009

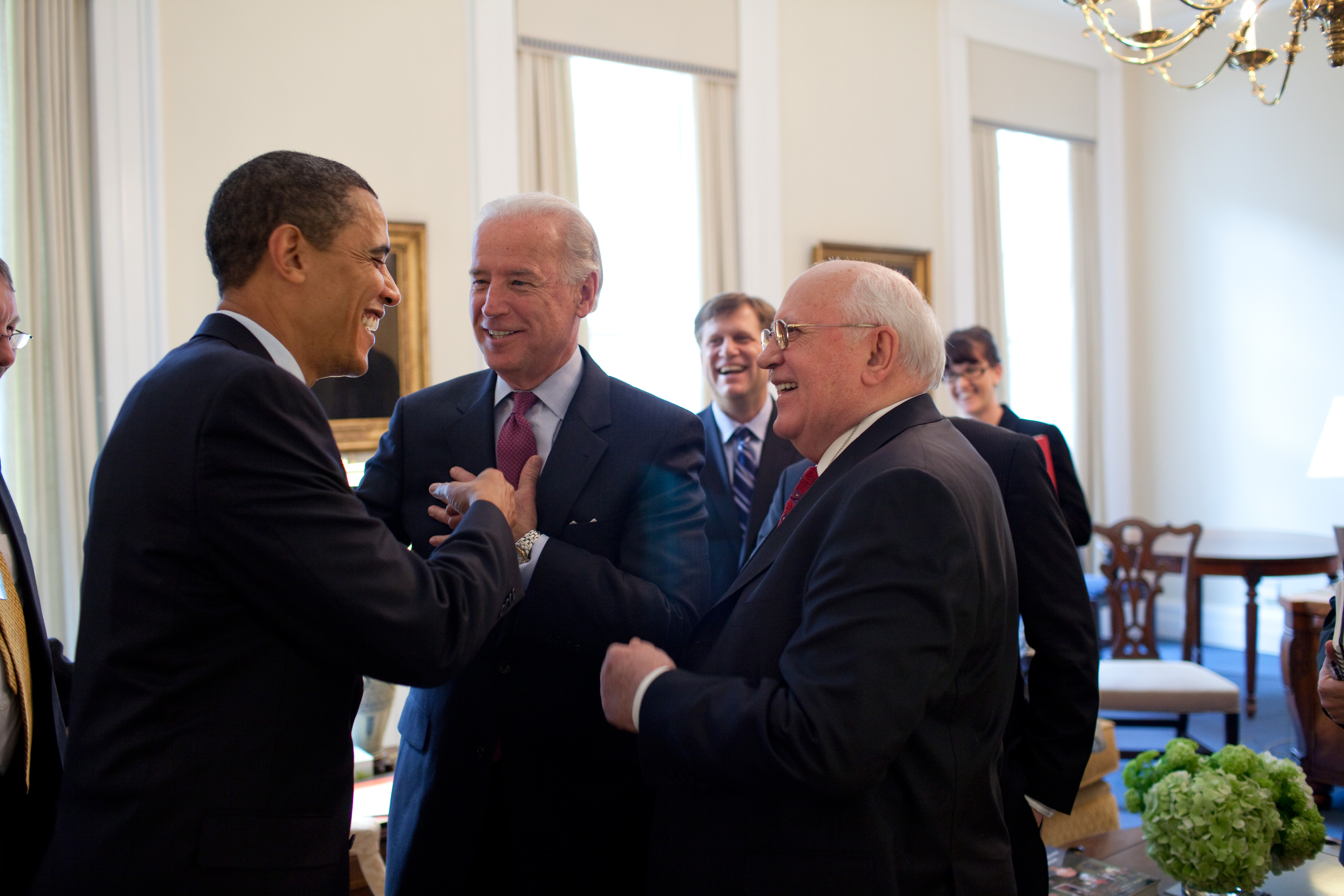
Barack Obama, Joe Biden and McFaul with former Soviet Union President Mikhail Gorbachev, March 20, 2009

In his capacity as a professor of political science at Stanford University, McFaul was the director of the university's Center on Democracy, Development, and the Rule of Law. A Hoover Institution Peter and Helen Bing Senior Fellow, McFaul is a Democrat who was the architect of U.S. President Barack Obama's policy on Russia.

=== Russia advisor to Obama (2009–2011) ===
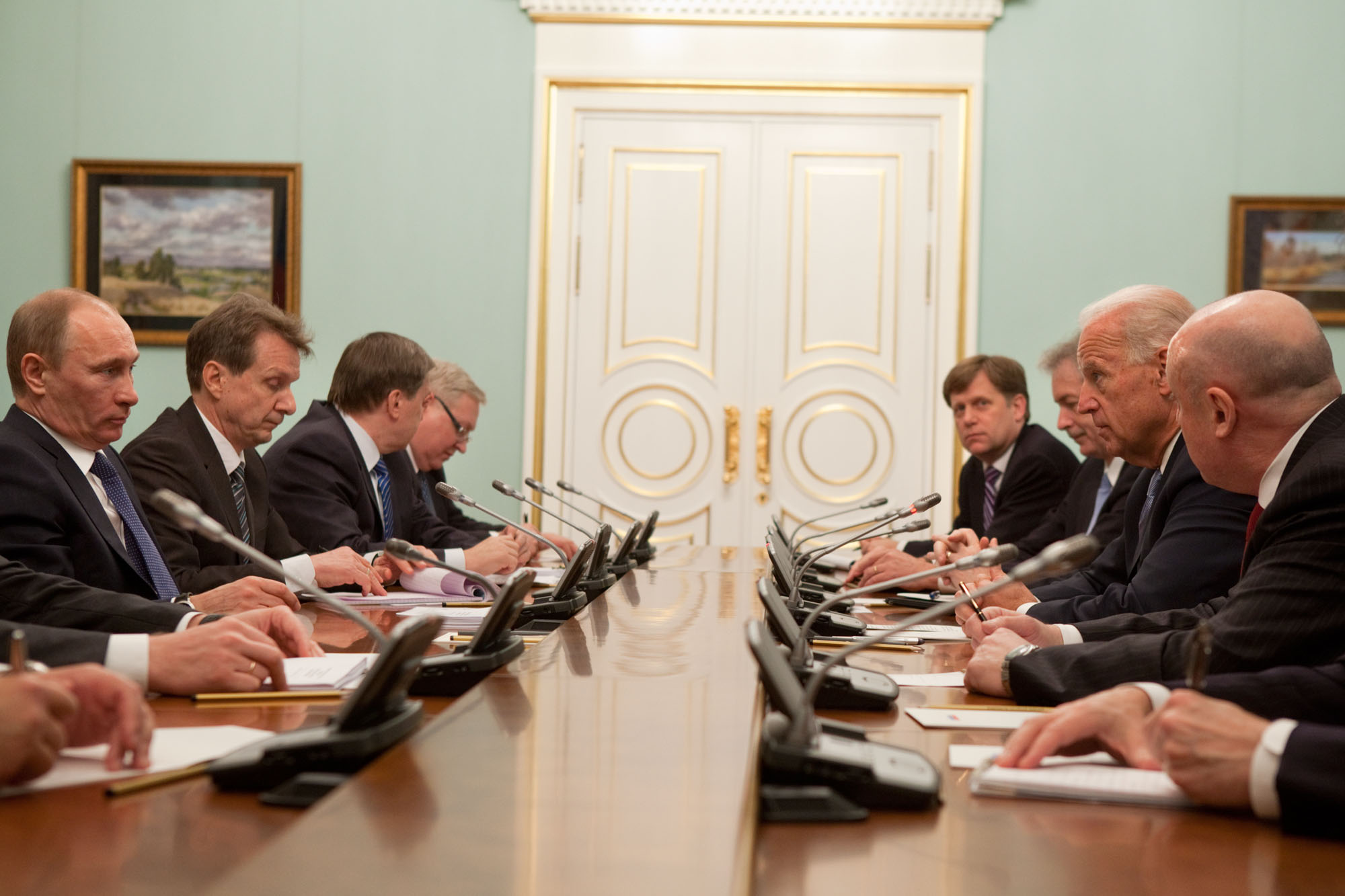
McFaul (end on right) at meeting between U.S. vice president Joe Biden and Russian prime minister Vladimir Putin in Moscow, Russia in March 2011

In 2009, McFaul joined the Barack Obama administration as a senior adviser in Washington, D.C., where he was the architect of the so-called "Russian reset" policy.

In March 2011, McFaul attended, in his official White House capacity, the meeting between Joe Biden and Vladimir Putin, which Biden characterized in his memoir as "argumentative." The two met again in a 2021 summit.

=== Ambassador to Russia (2011–2014) ===
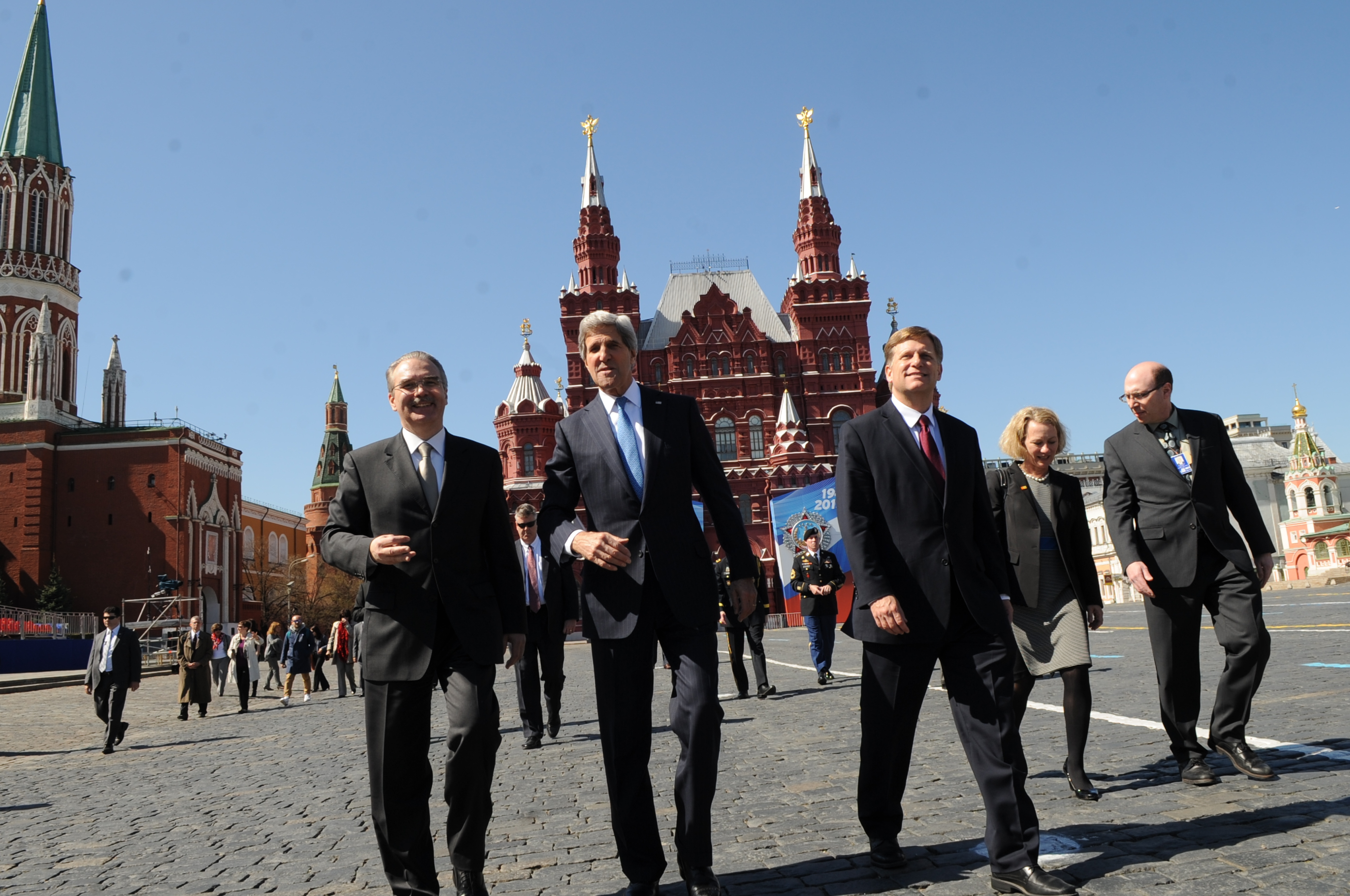
Secretary of State John Kerry and McFaul tour Red Square in Moscow on May 7, 2013

In November 2011, Obama nominated McFaul to be the 7th post-Soviet United States Ambassador to the Russian Federation. On December 17, 2011, the United States Senate confirmed McFaul by unanimous consent. McFaul became the first non-career diplomat to be the U.S. ambassador to Russia. He arrived in Russia just as huge protests were erupting over Vladimir Putin's resumption of the presidency. As ambassador he was accused of "fomenting revolution" by the Russian state media, meeting with Russian pro-democracy activists and commenting frequently on Twitter in English and Russian. In his Washington Post article though he argued that these meetings were in line with Obama's policy.

In a 2012 interview for the news portal Slon.ru, McFaul described himself as "specialist on democracy, anti-dictator movements, revolutions".

On January 17, 2012, soon after McFaul was appointed the new United States Ambassador to Russia and arrived in Moscow to assume his post, opposition politicians and civil activists visited the Embassy of the United States in Moscow. At the entrance to the embassy, they were encountered by pro-Kremlin activists. The visitors to McFaul included Yevgeniya Chirikova (environment activist), Boris Nemtsov (leader of the People's Freedom Party at the time; assassinated in 2015), Lev Ponomarev (human rights activist), Sergey Mitrokhin (leader of Yabloko party), Oksana Dmitriyeva (deputy head of A Just Russia), Lilia Shibanova (head of the GOLOS Association elections monitor group). Leonid Kalashnikov from the Communist Party of the Russian Federation also attended.

Reaction to the visit was mixed: then president Dmitry Medvedev, in his public comments at Moscow State University, largely exonerated McFaul by saying that meeting with opposition figures was a routine occurrence, although he warned the new U.S. ambassador that he was on Russian soil and should respect Russian political sensibilities. The incident sparked a highly negative reaction in the state-controlled Russian media, which accused him of conspiring with the opposition, but was appreciated by activists and social media users.

McFaul announced his resignation as ambassador to Russia on February 4, 2014, effective after the Sochi Olympics. John F. Tefft was confirmed as the next ambassador to Russia.

=== Return to academe (2014–present) ===
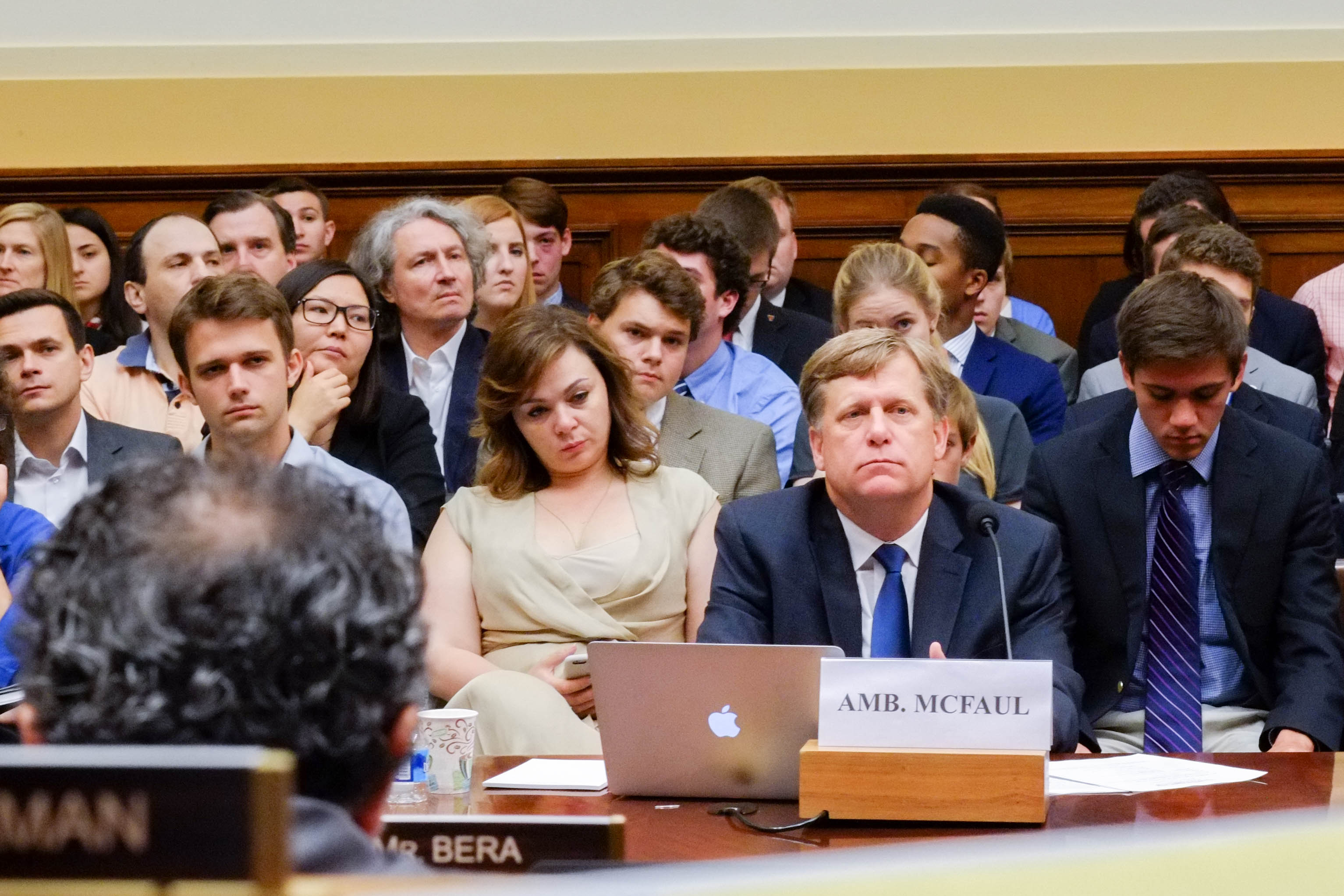
A House Foreign Affairs Committee hearing on U.S. policy toward Putin's Russia on June 14, 2016. McFaul testified as Russian lawyer Natalia Veselnitskaya, center left, sat behind him.

McFaul returned to Stanford as a professor of political science. He also became a senior fellow at the Hoover Institution. He continued to be involved in geopolitics. In October 2014, he stated that he believed the Russians continued to bug his and his wife's cell phones in the United States. In 2014 he was placed on the Kremlin's sanction list of people who are not allowed to enter Russia.

==== Russian request for an interrogation ====
On July 17, 2018, the Prosecutor General of Russia announced that it was seeking to question McFaul, amongst other Americans, in relation to its investigation of allegations made against Bill Browder. This followed a request Vladimir Putin made to President Donald Trump during the summit in Helsinki. In a White House news conference two days later, Press Secretary Sarah Huckabee Sanders said Trump described Putin's suggestion as an "interesting idea" and Trump "wants to work with his team and determine if there is any validity that would be helpful to the process".

On July 19, shortly before the Senate was to vote on a resolution opposing the idea, Sanders stated that Trump "disagreed" with the Putin proposal. The Senate approved the non-binding "sense of the Senate" resolution on a 98–0 vote; it stated that no current or former diplomat or other government employee should be made available to the Russians for interrogation.

==== 2022 Russian invasion of Ukraine ====
Following the 2022 Russian invasion of Ukraine, McFaul and head of the office of the president of Ukraine Andrii Yermak headed an expert group called the Yermak-McFaul Expert Group on Russian Sanctions, which developed an individual sanctions roadmap with plans to tighten sanctions against Russia.

McFaul debated the Russian invasion with John Mearsheimer in a Munk Debate of May 2022. McFaul has taken a position on the Russian invasion of Ukraine identifying Putin as a culprit in conducting the invasion of Ukraine against the position of Mearsheimer that Putin is pursuing a realist geopolitical plan to secure Russian national interests in the presence of perceived threats from an expanding NATO.

In an interview with Lex Fridman, Mearsheimer states that McFaul, as ambassador, told Putin "that [he] didn't have to worry about NATO expansion because the United States was a benign hegemon. And I asked Mike what Putin's response was to that. Mike said that Putin didn't believe" in the benignity of US hegemony. Mearsheimer goes on to relate that "what Mike thinks or any American thinks doesn't matter. What matters is what Putin thinks."

=== Books ===
McFaul was the author of over twenty books, among which are:

- Southern African Liberation and Great Power Intervention (1991, dissertation)
- Post-Communist Politics: Democratic Prospects In Russia And Eastern Europe (1993)
- The Troubled Birth of Russian Democracy: Political Parties, Programs, and Profiles (1993)
- Privatization, Conversion, and Enterprise Reform in Russia (1995) (co-editor)
- Previewing Russia's 1995 Parliamentary Elections (1995) (co-editor)
- Understanding Russia's 1993 Parliamentary Elections: Implications for U.S. Foreign Policy (1995)
- Russia's 1996 Presidential Election: The End of Polarized Politics (1997)
- Primer on Russia's 1999 Duma Elections (1999) (co-editor)
- Russia's Unfinished Revolution: Political Change from Gorbachev to Putin (2001)
- Popular Choice and Managed Democracy: The Russian Elections of 1999 and 2000 (2003) (co-author)
- Power and Purpose: U.S. Policy toward Russia After the Cold War (2004) (co-author)
- Between Dictatorship and Democracy: Russian Post-Communist Political Reform (2004) (co-author)
- Revolution in Orange: The Origins of Ukraine's Democratic Breakthrough (2006) (co-editor)
- Democracy and Authoritarianism in the Postcommunist World (2009) (co-editor)
- Advancing Democracy Abroad: Why We Should and How We Can (Hoover Studies in Politics, Economics, and Society) (2009)
- After the Collapse of Communism: Comparative Lessons of Transitions (2010) (co-editor)
- Promoting Democracy and the Rule of Law: American and European Strategies (2013) (co-editor)
- Transitions to Democracy: A Comparative Perspective (2013) (co-editor)
- Russia's Unfinished Revolution: Political Change from Gorbachev to Putin (2015)
- From Cold War to Hot Peace: An American Ambassador in Putin's Russia (2018)
- Privatization, Conversion, and Enterprise Reform in Russia (2019)
- Autocrats vs. Democrats: China, Russia, America, and the New Global Disorder (2025)

== Political positions ==
In 2003, McFaul supported peaceful, nonmilitary regime change in Iraq. Similarly to the UN Security Council and NATO allies, he did not support the military invasion. He supported promotion of democracy in Iraq, as elsewhere, by peaceful, nonmilitary means. After the 2016 presidential election, he became a regular commentator on MSNBC and social media and was frequently critical of the policies and actions of President Donald Trump with regard to Russia.

McFaul supported the Iran nuclear deal.

In July 2019, McFaul wrote that Chinese Communist Party's officials "champion the advantages of their system—an ability to undertake massive infrastructure projects, the capacity to manage income inequalities and a commitment to harmony in government and society. In contrast, polarized U.S. politics in the Trump era seem to impede any major initiative, be it infrastructure development or addressing income inequality."

McFaul voiced support for Israel during the Gaza war. In November 2023, he described Hamas and Russia as part of an "Illiberal International" that "has come together again to attack democratic Israel".

== Recognition ==
Coit D. Blacker called McFaul "the leading scholar of his generation, maybe the leading scholar, on post-Communist Russia" and a Stanford news release said his knowledge of Russia "was an important resource to politicians. He advised President George W. Bush on his dealings with Russian president Vladimir Putin."

== Personal life ==
McFaul and his wife, Donna Norton, married in 1993 and have two children.

== See also ==
- Russia under Vladimir Putin

== Footnotes ==
Diplomatic posts
| Preceded by John Beyrle | United States Ambassador to Russia; 2011–2014 | Succeeded by John F. Tefft |
