= Leyla Yunus =

Azerbaijani activist (born 1955)

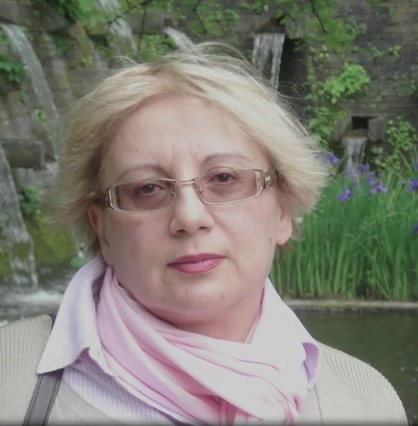
- Born: December 21, 1955 (age 70); Baku, Azerbaijan SSR, USSR
- Other name: Leyla Yunusova
- Occupation: human rights activist
- Organization(s): Institute of Peace and Democracy
- Known for: civil society engagement, helping citizens affected by forced evictions in Baku

Leyla Islam qizi Yunusova (née Vəliyeva; Azerbaijani: Leyla İslam qızı Yunusova; born 21 December 1955), better known as Leyla Yunus, is an Azerbaijani human rights activist and the director of Institute of Peace and Democracy, a human rights organisation. She is particularly known for her work helping citizens affected by forced evictions in Baku, on whose behalf she has organized several small protests.

She was one of the founders of the modern Popular Front party.

In July 2014, the Azerbaijani authorities jailed Yunus on fraud and tax evasion charges, which are widely regarded as dubious. After being sentenced to 8.5 years in jail on 13 August 2015, Leyla Yunus was released on grounds of her deteriorating health on 9 December 2015, with a court converting her sentence into a suspended one.

== Public career ==
Yunus is a historian by training and wrote her dissertation on "English-Russian Rivalry on the Caspian Sea and Azerbaijan in the First Part of the 18th Century".

In the last years of the Soviet Union, Yunus was active in pro-reform circles. In 1988, she founded the "Popular Front of Azerbaijan in Support of Perestroika", together with a small group of moderate intellectuals. Early on, this Popular Front of Azerbaijan was deliberately modeled on the example of the Popular Front of Estonia.

By January 1990, Yunus together with Zardusht Alizadeh formed the Social Democratic Party, with the aim of establishing a moderate political voice. In April 1990, Yunus published an essay "The Responsibilities of a Politician", arguing for a democratic middle course and rejecting both extreme nationalism and the violent repressions of the Soviet regime.

During the hostilities in the Nagorno-Karabakh conflict in 1992-1993, Yunus served as the Vice-Minister of Defence and Chief of the Information Analytical Centre of Ministry of Defence.

Subsequently, Yunus has worked with civil society activists in both Azerbaijan and Armenia to call for peace. She and her husband Arif, a historian, are known for actively pursuing reconciliation with Armenia. In 1998, she participated in the European Consultation of the International Fellowship of Reconciliation's Women Peacemakers Program (WPP), together with an Armenian counterpart, on active nonviolence.

In 1995, she became the Director of the Institute of Peace and Democracy.

In 2009, Yunus was tried for libel after she stated that there was police misconduct in a recent kidnapping trial, alleging that police had been involved in further trafficking the two young girls involved. Interior Minister Ramil Usubov filed a suit against her, stating that she had "caused danger to police power". He demanded 100,000 manat in damages. Human Rights Watch protested the trial, stating that "a judgment against Yunus would set a terrible precedent for freedom of expression in Azerbaijan", while other international groups described the case as "one more example of the Azerbaijani government cracking down on free expression".

In 2011, after a number of failed appeals to authorities regarding police behavior during evictions, Yunus stated her intention to appeal the evictions to the European Court of Human Rights. Authorities bulldozed Yunus' Baku office with only a few minutes' warning on 11 August 2011, the same day an article appeared in The New York Times in which she criticized forced evictions. She was in Norway on the day of the demolition. European Union representatives "deplored" the demolition, calling her organization "a regular partner of the international community". Azerbaijani Member of Parliament Khadi Musa Redzhabli denied that the bulldozing had been connected with Yunus' human rights work. Fifty-two human rights organisations from 14 countries, including Index on Censorship and the Rafto Foundation, sent a joint letter of concern to the Azerbaijani authorities condemning the demolition.

In 2014, together with Rasul Jafarov, Leyla Yunus has led a Working Group, which worked on compiling a list of political prisoners in Azerbaijan. In early August 2014 both of them have been arrested, and their names are the last ones on the list - final outcome of their work - which has been published by the Norwegian Helsinki Committee.

== Prosecution and international outcry ==
On 28 April 2014, Yunus and her husband Arif were detained at the Heydar Aliyev International Airport on their way to Doha, Qatar and charged with fraud and tax evasion. She and her husband Arif were jailed. As Yunus is diabetic, her situation in jail has been described as precarious amid reports that Azerbaijani authorities have refused to provide medical assistance to her. Prohibited from communicating with her husband directly, she has written an open letter which has been translated and published on various websites, and in which she has stated that "We [...] never would have predicted that the 21st century would bring [back] the repression of the 1930s."

The detention of Leyla and Arif Yunus, as well as Rasul Jafarov, has largely been regarded as another step in the state crackdown on civil society in Azerbaijan. These actions of the authorities have been harshly condemned by many prominent international human rights organizations, among them Amnesty International (which calls the Yunus "prisoners of conscience" and has called on the authorities to release them immediately), Parliamentary Assembly of the Council of Europe, United States Mission to the OSCE, Observatory for the Protection of Human Rights Defenders, Nobel Women's Initiative, Reporters Without Borders, Human Rights Watch and others.

Human Rights Watch called for the suspension of Azerbaijan's membership from an Extractive Industries Transparency Initiative (EITI) because of "Azerbaijan government’s offensive against human rights defenders and non-governmental organizations".

On 13 August 2015 Leyla Yunus was sentenced to 8.5 years in jail, her husband, Arif, was sentenced to 7 years in jail on charges of fraud and tax evasion. The couple also faced treason charges (for allegedly spying for Armenia) in a separate case, which was never heard. Western governments and human rights groups expressed concern over their prosecution. Human Rights Watch denounced their case as a show trial, and Amnesty International described the couple as prisoners of conscience.

Leyla Yunus was released on health grounds on 9 December 2015, after her husband Arif Yunus had previously been released, also on health grounds, in November 2015. Her sentence was converted into a suspended one. She thus has not been cleared of the charges.

Leyla and Arif Yunus were allowed by Azerbaijani government to travel to the Netherlands for health treatment in April 2016, where they remained to reside in.

== Awards ==
=== Nominations ===
In October 2014, Leyla Yunus was among the three finalists for the Sakharov Prize. The nomination had been supported by a number of prominent activists, including the last generation of Soviet dissidents and friends of late Andrei Sakharov. In announcing the Sakharov award, the European Parliament also stated that it had "decided to send a delegation with representatives from all political groups to Azerbaijan to meet and support Leyla Yunus in her fight for democracy and freedom in her country."

Leyla Yunus has also been nominated for the Human Rights Tulip award.

=== Awarded ===
In October 2014, The Norwegian Helsinki Committee awarded Leyla Yunus - together with Rasul Jafarov, Anar Mammadli and Intiqam Aliyev - The Andrei Sakharov Freedom Award.

Leyla Yunus received the Polish Prize of Sérgio Vieira de Mello in October 2014, for her personal achievement in the fight for human rights.

== See also ==
- Khadija Ismayilova
