= IDOC =

IDOC may refer to:

- Idaho Department of Correction
- Illinois Department of Corrections
- Indiana Department of Correction
- Institutional Documentation Service, part of the College Board's CSS Profile
- Iowa Department of Corrections
- IDoc, a data exchange format
