= Truth Hounds =

Ukrainian human rights organization

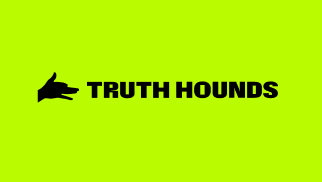
- Type: Non-profit; NGO
- Services: Protecting human rights
- Website: truth-hounds.org

Truth Hounds is a human rights organization that documents and investigates war crimes in Ukraine and eastern Europe. It was awarded the Andrei Sakharov Freedom Award in 2023.

Since its founding, Truth Hounds has conducted over 260 field missions, identified more than 200 suspects in international crimes, and carried out 55 in-depth investigations. The organization aims to pursue truth, hold perpetrators accountable, and provide expert evidence to support justice.

In 2025, Truth Hounds was designated as an 'undesirable organization' in Russia.

== Activities ==
Truth Hounds collects eyewitness testimonies and evidence to support criminal prosecutions. It has recorded over 5,000 testimonies.

The organisation identifies perpetrators through field investigations, OSINT analysis, and collaboration with police and judicial authorities. Notable cases include the Kramatorsk rocket strike, the destruction of Mariupol, and the killing of the writer Volodymyr Vakulenko. Research is conducted by means of analysis of the impact of the conflict on human rights, the environment, and economic security. Examples include studies on the destruction of the Kakhovka Dam and the Zaporizhzhia Nuclear Power Plant.

Truth Hounds tracks incidents with potential war crimes, archiving social media, satellite imagery, and media reports for verification. Its IDoc database is maintained to systematize evidence and support large-scale criminal cases. It also provides workshops and training sessions for investigators, lawyers, and human rights defenders on international humanitarian law and investigative methodology.

== International work ==
Truth Hounds collaborates with foreign investigators, prosecutors, and archives, contributing to universal jurisdiction cases. It has submitted nine reports to the International Criminal Court, including cases on the persecution of Crimean Tatars and attacks on civilians since the Russian invasion of Ukraine on 24 February 2022.
