= Fuad Gahramanli =

Azerbaijani politician

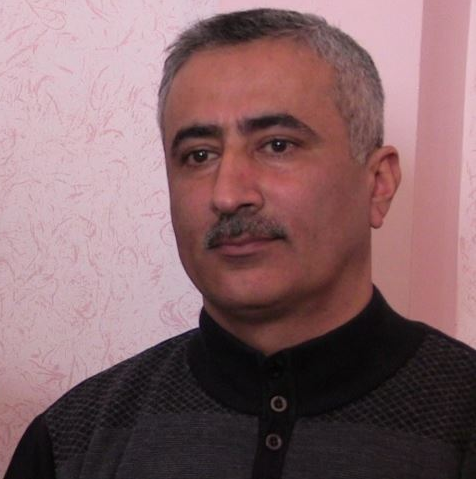
Gahramanli in 2020

Fuad Gahramanli was the Deputy Chairman of the Whole Azerbaijan Popular Front Party, an opposition political party in Azerbaijan.

== Career ==
In 2010, he was sued by five other candidates for political office for allegedly slandering them. In April 2011, Gahramanli participated in an anti-government political protest. Police arrested him and several other leading protesters. In October he received a suspended four-year sentence, which was reduced to a two-year house arrest. He was arrested again and was charged with inciting racial hatred in December 2015. His arrest came upon the release of another political prisoner, Leyla Yunus. He previously served time in jail in 1998 for an article that criticized the government of President Heydar Aliyev. The document was uncovered in a police raid on the headquarters for the newspaper Chag. He was convicted of violating Article 63–1 on 27 November 1998 and was sentenced to 18 months in prison but he was released following pressure from the US government.

In 2019 Fuad Gahramanli resigned from his seat as the deputy chairman after the domestic violence allegations made by his daughter Seljan Yaghmur. Allegations were followed by a scandalous divorce.
