= Arif Yunusov =

Azerbaijani human rights activist

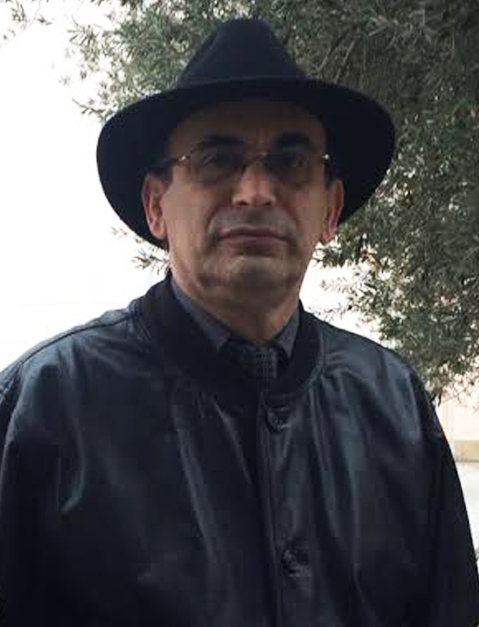
- Born: 12 January 1955 (age 71); Baku, Azerbaijan
- Other name: Arif Yunusov
- Occupations: author, historian, and human rights activist
- Organization(s): Institute of Peace and Democracy
- Known for: civil society engagement

Arif Seyfulla oghlu Yunusov, (Azerbaijani: Arif Seyfulla oğlu Yunusov; born 12 January 1955), also known as Arif Yunus, is an Azerbaijani author, historian, and human rights activist. He is the head of the Department of Conflict and Migration of the Institute of Peace and Democracy, a human rights non-governmental organization (NGO). Arif Yunusov along with his wife Leyla are supporters of a peaceful resolution to the Nagorno-Karabakh conflict between Armenia and Azerbaijan. On 28 April 2014, Arif Yunusov and his wife Leyla were jailed on charges of extortion and treason for allegedly spying for Armenia. After being detained, Arif Yunusov was sentenced to 7 years in jail; his wife, Leyla Yunus, was sentenced to 8.5 years in jail. Their sentences were suspended 15 months later, and the couple was allowed to leave for the Netherlands.

== Life and work ==
Arif Yunusov was born in Baku, Azerbaijan, on 12 January 1955, to an Azerbaijani father and an Armenian mother. He began his studies at Baku State University and graduated from there in 1981. During his time as a student in Baku State, Arif Yunusov met his future wife Leyla Yunus. Arif Yunusov eventually attained his doctorate in history in 1986. In 1992, working for the Presidential Office of Azerbaijan, he became the Head of Information and Analytical Department and served in this position for a year. He became the executive director of the Azeri Independent Information and Analytical Center. Having served his position at Azeri until September 1994, Yunusov eventually became the Chief of Department of Conflictology and Migration Studies of Institute of Peace and Democracy (IPD). The IPD promotes dialogue among intellectuals in both Armenia and Azerbaijan.

Arif Yunusov defends those who suffer from torture and condemns the imprisonment of people for political reasons.

Yunusov has published over 30 books and 190 articles related to Azerbaijani history and Armenian-Azerbaijani relations.

Arif Yunusov along with his wife Leyla are supporters of a peaceful resolution to the Nagorno-Karabakh conflict between Armenia and Azerbaijan. He has taken part in various conferences and seminars for such a solution to the conflict.

== Arrest, imprisonment, and release ==
On 28 April 2014, Arif Yunusov and his wife Leyla were detained at the Heydar Aliyev International Airport on their way to Doha, Qatar amid a crackdown on human rights activists and journalists. He and Leyla were then jailed. At times, during various trials, Arif Yunusov lost consciousness due to his health conditions. He was released due to poor health and was placed under guard and prohibited from leaving Baku.

On 13 August 2015, Arif Yunusov was sentenced to 7 years in jail, and his wife, Leyla, was sentenced to 8.5 years in jail on charges that include fraud and tax evasion. The couple also faced treason charges (allegedly for spying for Armenia) in a separate case, which was later suspended. Western governments and human rights groups expressed concern over their prosecution. Human Rights Watch denounced their case as a show trial, and Amnesty International declared the couple prisoners of conscience.

The detention of Arif and Leyla Yunus, as well as Rasul Jafarov, has largely been regarded as another step in the state crackdown on civil society in Azerbaijan. The actions of the authorities were harshly condemned by many prominent international human rights organizations, among them Amnesty International (which calls the Yunus "prisoners of conscience" and has called on the authorities to release them immediately), Parliamentary Assembly of the Council of Europe, United States Mission to the OSCE, Observatory for the Protection of Human Rights Defenders, Nobel Women's Initiative, Reporters Without Borders, Human Rights Watch and others.

Human Rights Watch called for the suspension of Azerbaijan's membership from an Extractive Industries Transparency Initiative (EITI) because of "Azerbaijan government’s offensive against human rights defenders and non-governmental organizations".

Leyla and Arif Yunus were allowed by the Azerbaijani government to travel to the Netherlands for health treatment in April 2016, where they remained to reside in.

== Personal life ==
Arif Yunusov is married to Leyla Yunus. They have one daughter.
