= Intiqam Aliyev =

Azerbaijani lawyer

- Azerbaijani: İntiqam Əliyev
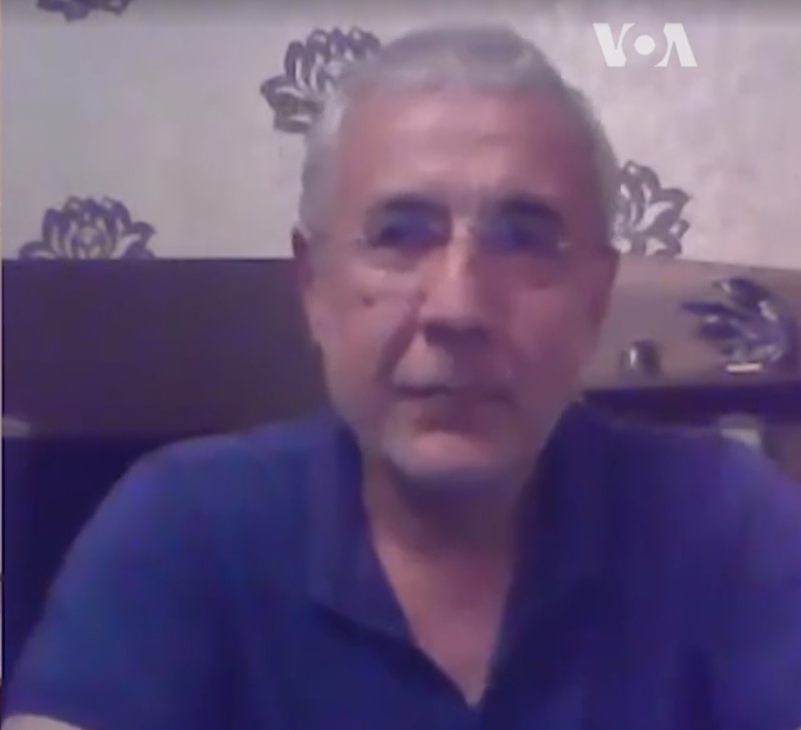
- Born: November 30, 1962 (age 63); Bilasuvar District, Azerbaijan SSR, USSR
- Education: Baku State University
- Occupations: human rights activist and lawyer
- Awards: Homo Homini Award (2012)

Intiqam Kamil oglu Aliyev (Azerbaijani: İntiqam Kamil oğlu Əliyev; sometimes also spelled Intigam; born 30 November 1962, Pushkin (now Bilasuvar), Azerbaijan SSR) is an Azerbaijani lawyer and human rights activist.

Along with other human rights activists, Aliyev was jailed in mid-2014 as part of a countrywide crackdown. In April 2015, the court sentenced him to 7.5 years in jail. Aliyev's arrest is widely considered to have been politically motivated. Aliyev had previously brought a number of cases against Azerbaijani authorities to the European Court of Human Rights.

Prior to his arrest, Aliyev ran the Legal Education Society (LES). On 22 April 2015, he was sentenced to seven and a half years’ imprisonment. He was found guilty of large-scale embezzlement and fraud, illegal business and tax evasion. He was considered a prisoner of conscience by Amnesty International. On 28 March 2016, the Supreme Court ordered his release and he was freed the same day. On 28 March 2016, the Supreme Court of Azerbaijan changed his prison sentence from seven years and six months to a five-year suspended sentence.

== Awards ==
- 2012: the Homo Homini Award for his work on human rights;He was chosen as the best human rights defender of 2012.
- 2014 (October): the Andrei Sakharov Freedom Award of the Norwegian Helsinki Committee, together with Leyla Yunus, Rasul Jafarov and other political prisoners in Azerbaijan. Since he was in jail, the award was received by his children.
- 2015 (October): Human Rights Award, of the International Bar Association, for outstanding contribution to human rights. Since he was in jail, the award was received by his children.
- 2016 (February): Human Rights Award, of the Council of Bars and Law Societies of Europe (CCBE), for devoting "his life to protecting the rights of individuals against the repressive system of the Azerbaijani government" and providing for decades a "legal assistance and representation to the politically persecuted". Since he was in jail, the award was received by his children.
- 2016: Civil Rights Defender of the Year Award, Civil Rights Defenders
