= Rasul Jafarov =

Azerbaijani lawyer and activist

- Rəsul Cəfərov
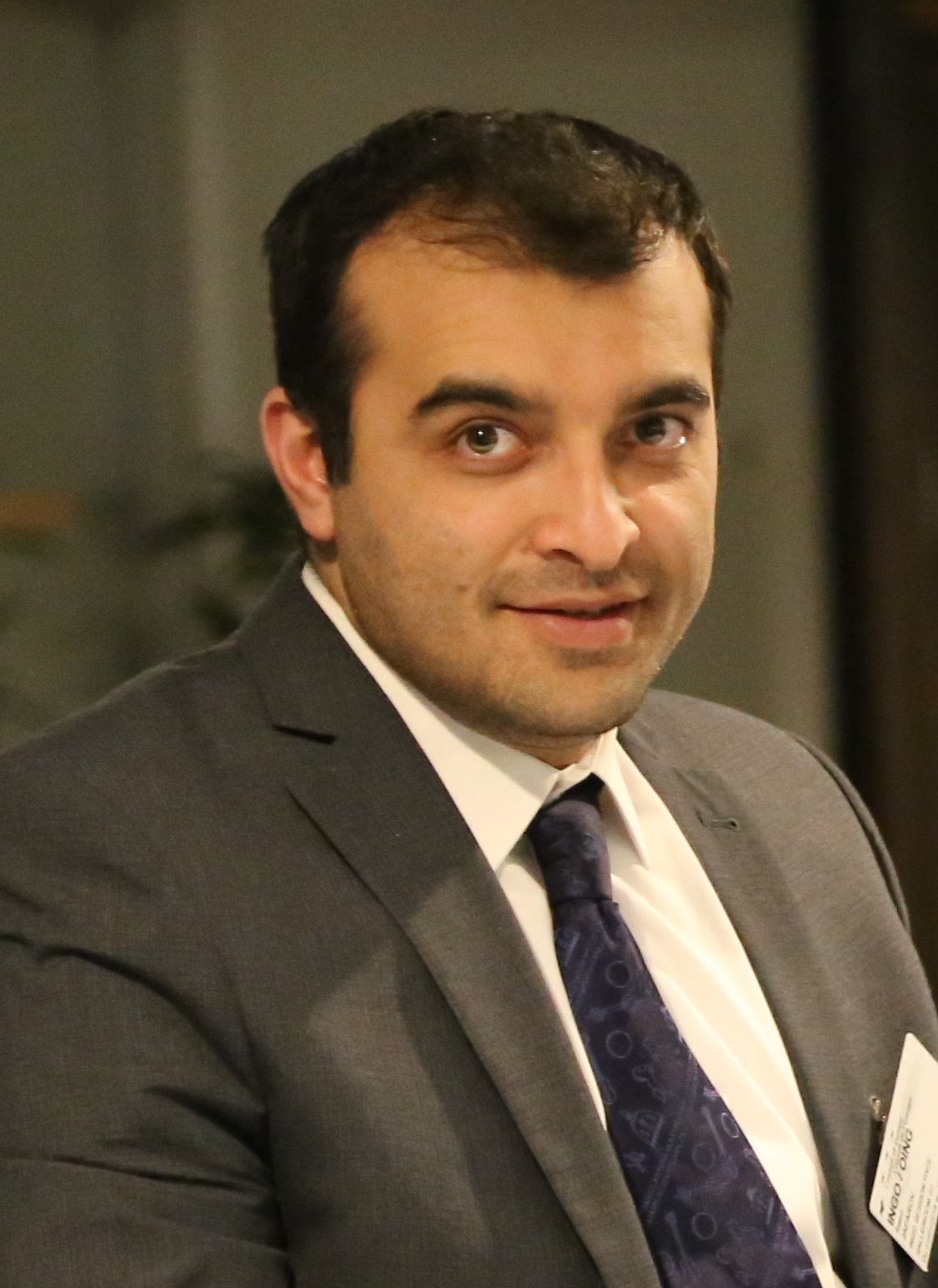
- Rasul Jafarov
- Born: 17 August 1984 (age 41); Azerbaijan
- Occupations: lawyer, human rights activist
- Known for: human rights activism
- Awards: The Andrei Sakharov Freedom Award by Norwegian Helsinki Committee (2014)

Rasul Aghahasan oghlu Jafarov (Azerbaijani: Rəsul Ağahəsən oğlu Cəfərov; born August 17, 1984) is a lawyer and prominent human rights defender in Azerbaijan.

In April 2015, he was sentenced to six and a half years' imprisonment. He was considered a prisoner of conscience by Amnesty International. He received a pardon in March 2016.

== Education ==
Jafarov is a lawyer by training, and holds a bachelor's and a master's degree in international and European law. He is an alumnus of Central European University.

== Activities ==
Rasul Jafarov has worked as reporter for the Institute for Reporters' Freedom and Safety (IRFS), where he investigated (as reporter) numerous criminal cases against journalists, prepared reports about the cases, and monitored the trials and legal correspondences.

He is also a founder and chairman of the Human Rights Club (HRC), non-formal group, which has been denied legal registration by the Azerbaijani court since the group establishment in 2010. Within the HRC Jafarov has coordinated in 2012 the "Sing for Democracy" campaign. Using the occasion of Azerbaijan hosting the Eurovision Song Contest, this campaign demanded that citizens' rights be respected, and highlighted that two journalists critical of the authorities in Azerbaijan had been murdered. The "Sing for Democracy" campaign received wide international coverage. In December 2012, “Sing for Democracy” was expanded and rebranded as “Art for Democracy,” which Rasul Jafarov continues to lead.

Also in 2012 Rasul Jafarov has organized "Expression Online Initiative" that coincided with Internet Governance Forum, which took place in Baku, Azerbaijan. "The campaign continues to expand Internet freedoms by protecting online activists, streamlining and initiating new Internet freedom legislation, as well as engaging in practical solutions to protect Internet rights."

Jafarov has been involved in a number of other efforts to educate citizens of Azerbaijan about their rights, to ensure legal representation of political prisoners, and to highlight human rights abuses.

He was also an active participant of the Eastern Partnership Civil Society Forum.

In June 2014, Rasul Jafarov has been included to the Natalia Project - alarm and positioning system for human rights defenders at risk.

In 2014, together with Leyla Yunus, Rasul Jafarov has led a Working Group, which worked on compiling a list of political prisoners in Azerbaijan. In early August 2014 both of them have been arrested, and their names are the last ones on the list - final outcome of their work - which has been published by the Norwegian Helsinki Committee.

== Political prisoner ==
On August 2, 2014 Jafarov was imprisoned on charges that are widely considered to be fabricated.

During detention, Rasul Jafarov turned 30 years old. On the occasion of his 30th birthday his friends and supporters organized an action "Books for Rasul - birthday in prison".

Numerous international organizations, including Human Rights Watch, Amnesty International, the Open Society Institute and the International Bar Association have highlighted his arrest in a public letter. Also inter-governmental institutions, such as European Union, United Nations, has expressed their deep concern regarding Rasul Jafarov's detention.

In April 2015, he was sentenced to six and a half years' imprisonment.

In March 2016 Jafarov was among 148 prisoners who received a presidential pardon.

== Awards ==
=== Nominations ===
In 2014, a number of organizations have also put Jafarov forward for the Sakharov Prize, together with Leyla Yunus and Intiqam Aliyev.

Rasul Jafarov has been also nominated for the Human Rights Tulip award.

=== Awarded ===
In October 2014, The Norwegian Helsinki Committee awarded Rasul Jafarov - together with Leyla Yunus, Anar Mammadli and Intiqam Aliyev - The Andrei Sakharov Freedom Award.
