= Russian reset =

2009–2013 attempt to improve relations between the US and Russia

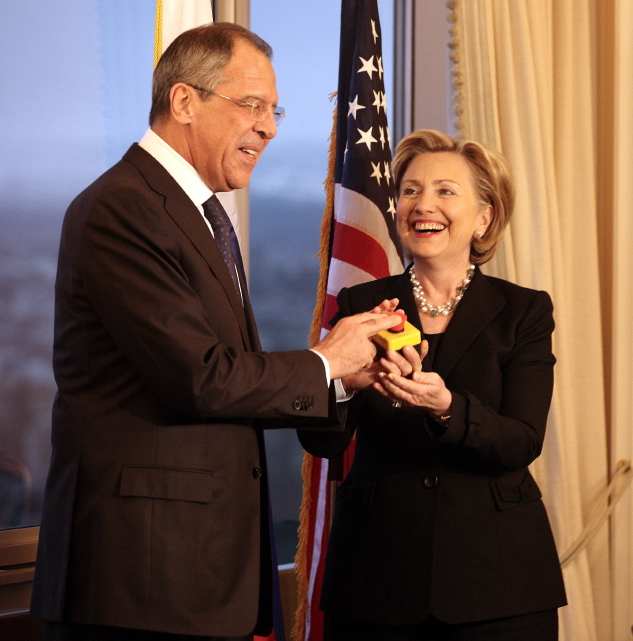
Hillary Clinton and Sergey Lavrov with the "reset" button Clinton presented to Lavrov in March 2009

The Russian reset was an attempt by the Obama administration to improve relations between the United States and Russia in 2009–2013.

== Symbolic reset ==
On March 6, 2009 in Geneva, U.S. Secretary of State Hillary Clinton presented Russian Foreign Minister Sergey Lavrov with a red button with the English word "reset" and the Latin transliteration of the Russian Cyrillic alphabet word перегрузка (peregruzka). It was intended that this would be the Russian word for "reset" but actually was the word for "overload" (The correct translation would be перезагрузка, perezagruzka.) Additionally, the button switch was the type commonly used as an emergency stop on industrial equipment. Hillary Clinton was later praised by the Russian diplomats for resolving the issue politely, stating her team's good intentions. Lavrov and Clinton pushed the button simultaneously.

== Substantive reset ==
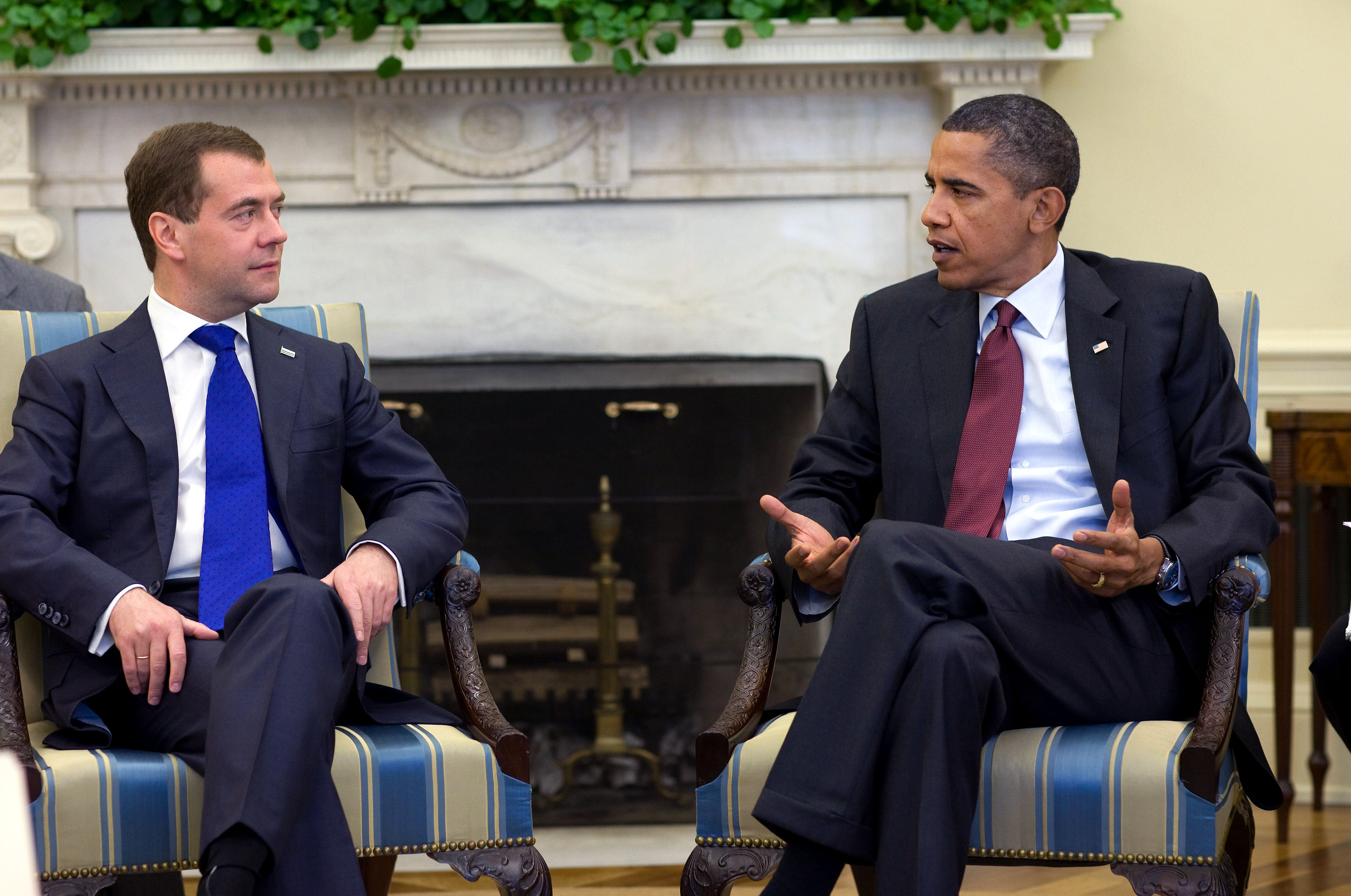
Russian President Medvedev and U.S. President Obama in the Oval Office, June 2010

Prior to the reset, U.S.–Russia relations had been hurt by the 2008 Russo-Georgian diplomatic crisis in Ossetia, leading to Immediate Response 2008 by the Bush administration and later the Russo-Georgian War.

In July 2009, Russian president Dmitry Medvedev announced that U.S. forces and supplies could pass through Russian airspace on their way to Afghanistan. On September 17, 2009, U.S. President Barack Obama announced that the U.S. was dropping the Bush administration's plan to build a missile defense shield in Eastern Europe. Russia had viewed the planned missile shield as a military threat. Vladimir Putin said the decision was "correct and brave". In March, 2010, the U.S. and Russia agreed to reduce their nuclear arsenals.

In May 2010, major powers including the U.S., China, and Russia agreed on sanctions against Iran. Three days later, the Obama administration cancelled sanctions against the Russian state arms export agency, which had been sanctioned for exporting arms to Iran.

In response to the adoption of the Magnitsky Act in 2012, the Russian government passed the Dima Yakovlev Law, which prohibited Americans from adopting Russian children, and issued a list of U.S. officials barred from entering Russia.

At the 2015 Munich Security Conference, then-Vice President Joe Biden specified the substantive progress, and setbacks:

[...] once we pressed that reset button in 2009, between then and 2012, we achieved a great deal in cooperation with Russia to advance our mutual interests and I would argue the interests of Europe—the New START Treaty that reduced our strategic nuclear arsenal by one-third; a vital supply route for coalition troops in and out of Afghanistan; at the United Nations Security Council, resolutions that pressured North Korea and Iran and made possible serious nuclear discussions in Tehran, which continue as I speak.

All of us, we all invested in a type of Russia we hoped—and still hope—will emerge one day: a Russia integrated into the world economy; more prosperous, more invested in the international order.

It was in that same spirit that we supported the establishment of the NATO-Russia Council and Russian membership in countless other institutions, from the Council of Europe to the WTO. Unfortunately, and I mean it when I say unfortunately, as the Chancellor pointed out this morning, President Putin has chosen a different path.

— Munich, February 7, 2015

== Subsequent deterioration of relations ==
As early as the March 2014 censure of Russia by the United Nations over the Russian annexation of Crimea, the reset was described in the press as "failed". Stated reasons included the annexation, the pro-Russian unrest in Ukraine, and lack of Russian cooperation with the U.S. on Syria. Former Polish Minister of Foreign Affairs Adam Rotfeld stated that the reset showed "weakness". Jeb Bush also called the reset a failure, stating that Russia had "invaded Ukraine", which Russia had not done prior to the reset. He added that Putin was a "bully" and that "nuanced" behavior by the U.S. towards Putin tended to "enable bad behavior." Lithuanian President Dalia Grybauskaitė in 2010 refused to go to Prague to meet with President Obama in protest of the reset.

However, Hillary Clinton defended the reset as a "brilliant stroke", pointing to the Russian agreement to sanctions against Iran and permission to fly over its territory to supply joint NATO troops in Afghanistan.

In October 2014, Medvedev said that a reset of relations with the U.S. was "impossible" and that relations had been damaged by "destructive" and "stupid" international sanctions against Russia. The sanctions had been imposed because of the Russo-Ukrainian war and the shooting down of Malaysia Airlines Flight 17, which Western powers said was the result of a missile fired from Russian-controlled territory.

In April 2015, CNN reported that "Russian hackers had penetrated sensitive parts of the White House computers in recent months." It was said that the FBI, the Secret Service, and other U.S. intelligence agencies categorized the attacks as "among the most sophisticated attacks ever launched against U.S. government systems."

In April 2016, two Russian jets flew over the U.S. destroyer USS Donald Cook almost a dozen times, American officials said. At one point the jets were so close – about 9 m (30 ft) – that they created wakes in the water around the ship. The jets had no visible weaponry and the ship took no action.

This sharp decline in relations has been termed Cold War II by some.

== See also ==
- Michael McFaul
