= Forced evictions in Baku =

Government program in Baku, Azerbaijan

Since 2008, the government of Azerbaijan has been implementing a program of forced evictions in the capital city of Baku, confiscating and subsequently demolishing privately owned properties to make room for the development of modernized infrastructure. The evictions were first ordered by the city's municipal government as part of a massive reconstruction effort aimed at increasing the appeal of the downtown metropolis. From 2011 onward, the number of housing complexes being forcibly vacated has increased substantially.

Numerous development projects have begun in the aftermath of the housing demolitions, including new parking lots, several boutique stores, boulevards, skyscrapers, a shopping center, luxury housing, and a Formula One race track. There are also plans to build a 1,050 m (3,444 ft) housing complex, which would make it the world's tallest man-made structure upon completion.

Baku city officials have stated that the compensation being offered to residents is fair, while human rights groups argue that residents have been pressured to leave without adequate compensation to buy similar dwellings elsewhere. Independent observers estimate that several thousand people have been displaced as a result of the forced evictions.

== Background ==
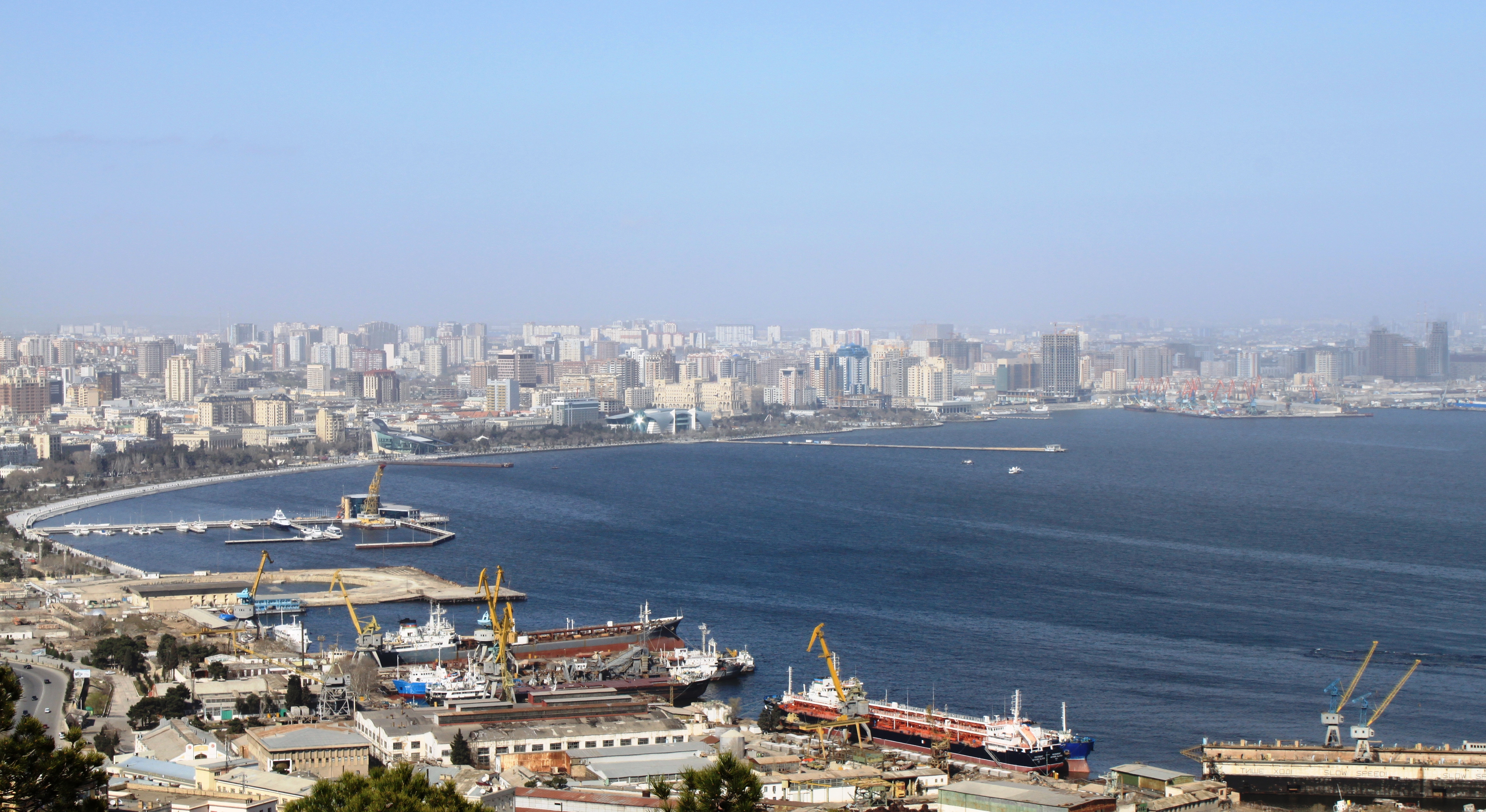
Skyline of Baku, the capital of Azerbaijan in 2010.

Azerbaijan gained independence from the Soviet Union following its dissolution in 1991. Despite severe infrastructural damage resulting from the first Nagorno-Karabakh War and the post-Soviet transition phase, the country has managed to develop a robust and stable economy through revenues from petroleum exports. The State Oil Company of Azerbaijan Republic (abbreviated as "SOCAR") is the 68th largest organization in the world, valued at roughly $20 billion USD. Azerbaijan ranks 7th in the world on an aggregate list of countries by proven natural gas reserves, as well as 19th on a similarly compiled list of nations by proven petroleum reserves. In the past, Azerbaijan has made efforts to focus on greater cultural and economic integration with the West, notably through hosting the 57th annual Eurovision contest in 2012. Though the Eurovision contest also motivated the authorities to evict baku residents and demolish edifices for development purposes.

== Demolitions ==
According to a Human Rights Watch (HRW) report, authorities used various methods to expel people from their homes, including arbitrary arrests and detentions, deprivation of basic necessities for occupants in targeted households, intimidation, and beginning the demolition process prior to the evacuation of inhabitants. The report stated that authorities sometimes acted without any prior notice.

Construction of new public facilities and attractions generally commenced shortly after demolition, with a new 25,000 square metre park nearing completion as of 1 August 2012. The government offered to compensate the former residents of expropriated properties. HRW criticized the reimbursements as being inadequate for purchasing any new property in Baku. Those who refused compensation were evicted and often became homeless.

In the run-up to the 2012 Eurovision Song Contest, authorities evicted more residents to make room for the Baku Crystal Hall arena, where the event would subsequently be held. Zohrab Ismayil, who authored a report on forced evictions in Baku, said that 281 families were evicted to make room for construction, and that the government paid them compensation below the market rate on several occasions. The government stated that the evictions had no relevance to the contest, but were part of a larger seven-year reconstruction plan aimed at developing the downtown area of the city.

== Reactions ==
The evictions were condemned by several international human rights organizations, including Freedom House, Human Rights Watch, and Amnesty International. As part of a resolution passed by the European Parliament on 24 May 2012, which condemned Azerbaijan's human rights abuses, the elected body also expressed alarm over the mass expulsion of civilians from their households for future development projects, including the Crystal Palace. The evictions became a point of contention in Azerbaijan's successful bid to host the 2012 Eurovision Song Contest.

On two occasions, authorities were accused of retaliating against activists and journalists who publicized the evictions. On 11 August 2011, the office of Azerbaijani human rights activist Leyla Yunus was bulldozed without warning, giving the occupants no time to salvage furniture or other personal belongings. All documents inside the building at the time of its demolition were destroyed. An Azeri MP denied that the demolition was connected with Yunus's activism. The European Union delegation to Baku stated that it "deplored" the destruction of her organization's office, describing her as "a regular partner of the international community". The demolition came hours after The New York Times published an article detailing Yunus's advocacy against the forced evictions. Later, on 18 April 2012, several Azeri journalists were severely beaten by SOCAR security forces, allegedly for covering the demolitions while they were in process. This includes Idrak Abbasov, who was subsequently hospitalized in critical condition.

== See also ==
- Human rights in Azerbaijan
