= Azerbaijan International Mineral Resources Operating Company =

Azerbaijan International Mineral Resources Operating Company, Ltd. (AIMROC) is an Azerbaijani holding company and is the second largest gold producer in Azerbaijan.

Ownership interests in the company are held by the President and First Lady of Azerbaijan, Ilham Aliyev and Mehriban Aliyeva. The company is located at 49/s, Tbilisi Ave, Chiraq Plaza, 5th Floor, Baku AZ1065.

== Chovdar mine ==
According to Asia Times Online, the Azerbaijani government gave AIMROC the rights to develop the Chovdar gold field and five other sites in Azerbaijan. The government gave AIMROC a 70 percent stake in a gold field near Chovdar. The government itself owns the other 30 percent.

AIMROC sold the first bar of gold from the Chovdar mine at the end of 2012. AIMROC is predicted to be in full production in 2013. Trend News Agency quoted Mustafa Mammadov, AIMROC’s Director for Sustainable Development and Strategic Planning, as saying that the company plans to mine in Chovdar for 8 to 10 years.

== Ownership ==
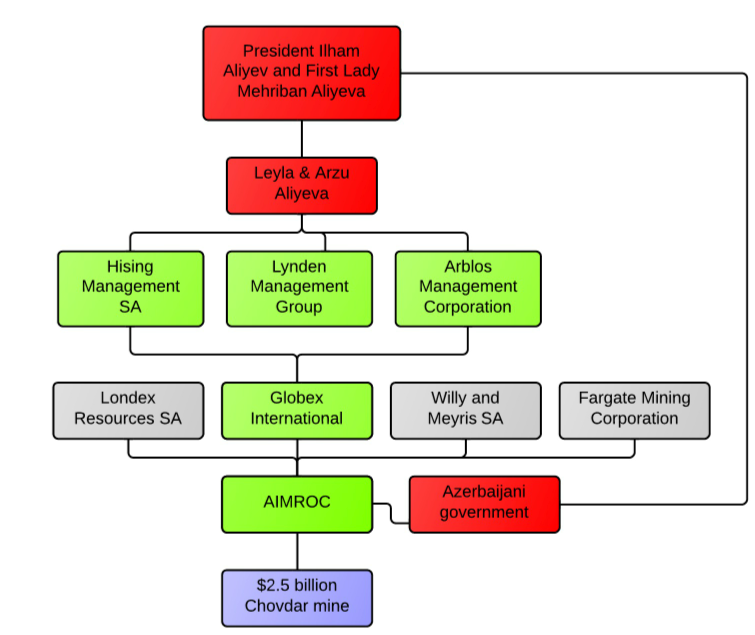
This is an organizational chart of the ownership of the Azerbaijani company "Azerbaijan International Mineral Resources Operating Company."

AIMROC owns seventy-percent of the Chovdar mine. Four companies own AIMROC, Londex Resources SA, Globex International, Willy and Meyris, Fargate Mining Corporation .One of those companies is called Globex International. Globex’s stake in AIMROC is worth areound $200 million U.S. dollars. According to Radio Free Europe/Radio Liberty (RFE/RL), “A fifth company -- Mitsui Mineral Development Engineering Co Ltd (MINDECO), a mining-engineering company owned by Japan's Mitsui Mining and Smelting Company -- is listed as the official project supervisor, but has no ownership.”

According to Asia Times Online, Globex International is owned by three holding companies in Panama. Those three holding companies all list President Aliyev and First Lady Aliyeva’s two daughters Leyla Aliyeva and Arzu Aliyeva as senior managers. Asia Times Online also reported that President Aliyev’s office “refused to answer questions about his family’s business interests in the gold fields” and that the president’s spokesman did not return emails and calls for comment.

According to a report published by Freedom House, Azerbaijani law prohibits government officials, including the president, from owning businesses, but there are no such restrictions on family members.

The Azerbaijani Environment Ministry has estimated that the Chovdar mine contains around $2.5 billion worth of gold and silver.
