= Lilia Shibanova =

Russian activist

Lilia Vasilevna Shibanova (Russian: Лилия Васильевна Шибанова) is a Russian activist and is the head of the independent election monitoring group Golos. She was awarded the Andrei Sakharov Freedom Award.

On 12 May 2016 Lilia was arrested by Belarusian border guards, while she was on her way to Moscow.

In June 2013 Golos' activities was banned for six months.

The Russian news agency Itar- Tass reported that On 14 June 2013, Golos would file a complain to the European Court of Human Rights against branding it as a foreign agent. Earlier on 2 December 2011 Russian prosecutor in Moscow accused Golos of violating election regulations.

On 8 September 2014, Moscow City Court rejected a decision made by the government to consider Golos as a “foreign agent”.
