= Anar Mammadli =

Azerbaijani human rights activist (born 1978)

- Anar Məmmədli
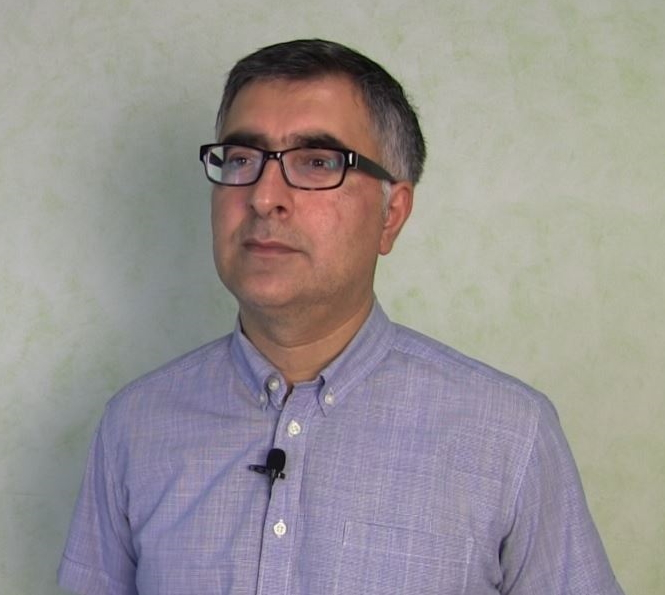
- Born: 1978 (age 47–48); Yevlakh, Azerbaijan SSR, USSR
- Education: Syracuse University
- Occupation: Human Rights Activist
- Awards: Václav Havel Human Rights Prize (2014)

Anar Asaf oglu Mammadli (Azerbaijani: Məmmədli Anar Asaf oğlu; born 1978) is a prominent human rights activist in Azerbaijan. He is active in observing and monitoring elections, and he has repeatedly criticized the conduct of elections by Azerbaijani authorities. On 16 December 2013, Mammadli was arrested and jailed, following outspoken criticism of presidential elections in October 2013. In spite of international protests, Mammadli was sentenced to more than 5 years in jail in May 2014. On 29 September 2014, while still in detention, Mammadli was awarded the Václav Havel Human Rights Prize by the Parliamentary Assembly of the Council of Europe, which honours "outstanding" action in defence of human rights.

== Early life ==
Anar Mammadli was born in 1978 in Yevlax, an industrial city in the Azerbaijani Soviet Socialist Republic. He was raised in a typical Soviet family; his father was a civil servant who worked in a factory and was active in the labour union, while his mother was employed as a social worker. His early years were shaped by the period of perestroika, marked by both material hardship and an emerging openness in Soviet society. This era brought increased access to independent media, samizdat literature, and public discourse on topics such as Soviet repression, national identity, and the push for independence.

Mammadli's childhood also coincided with the outbreak of the Nagorno-Karabakh conflict in the late 1980s. At the age of ten, he and his family participated in local demonstrations supporting Azerbaijan’s independence and territorial integrity. The events of Black January in 1990, when Soviet troops violently suppressed protests in Baku, and the subsequent First Nagorno-Karabakh War left a profound impact on him. The conflict displaced many people, some of whom found refuge in Mammadli’s school, where he assisted in their accommodation and support.

== Activism ==
Mammadli began his activism in the late 1990s. In 1997, he established the Secular Progress Youth Organization together with Bashir Suleymanli and other young co-founders. In 2001, Anar Mammadli participated in setting up the Election Monitoring Center. Five months before the Azerbaijani Presidential Elections in 2008, the registration of this organization was cancelled by the Khatai District Court on 14 May 2008 based on a technicality in official filings. In response, Anar Mammadli and Bashir Suleymanli established the Election Monitoring and Democracy Studies Center (EMDS) in December 2008.

Mammadli's organization is a member of the European Network of Election Monitoring Organizations (ENEMO), European Platform for Democratic Elections (EPDE), Network of Parliament Monitoring Organizations and the Civil Society Forum of the Eastern Partnership Program of the European Union, and Mammadli participated in numerous election observations internationally.

In addition to his activism, Mammadli has worked as a journalist, holding a variety of positions as newspaper reporter, commentator, editor and assistant to the editor in chief at “Merkez”("Center"), “Hurriyet” ("Freedom"), and “Bugün” ("Today"), from 1998 to 2002.

Mammadli is a graduate from the Syracuse University.

== Arrest ==
After vocal criticism of the presidential elections held on 9 October 2013, the EMDS found itself under increasing pressure. In its report on the elections, the EMDS had highlighted a series of irregularities, saying that conditions for a free and democratic vote had not been met.

Shortly after EMDS published its report, the General Prosecutor's Office of the Republic of Azerbaijan opened a criminal case against Mammadli and he was arrested on 16 December 2013. On 26 May 2014, Mammadli was sentenced to 5 years and 6 months by the decision of Baku Grave Crimes Court. Mammadli was charged with illegal entrepreneurship, tax evasion, abuse of official authority to influence on the results of election, charges rejected by Mammadli and his lawyers. The trial and sentence was criticized by many international organizations and human rights groups. Amnesty International considers Anar Mammadli a prisoner of conscience, and a number of countries have called for his release.

In September 2014, Mammadli was awarded the Václav Havel Human Rights Prize by the Parliamentary Assembly of the Council of Europe (PACE). With this award, the Council of Europe wants to honour "outstanding civil society action in defence of human rights".

On 17 March 2016, after almost 2.5 years in prison, Anar Mammadli was pardoned by the president of Azerbaijan, along with a number of high profile political prisoners.

== Second arrest and imprisonment ==
On 7 September 2026, Mammadli was sentenced to 13 years in prison on charges including currency smuggling, illegal entrepreneurship, tax evasion, money laundering, and document forgery. He had been in pre-trial detention for the previous two years. The human rights group Human Rights Watch described Mammadli's trial as "unfair" and representing a "crackdown on independent voices".
