= Norwegian Helsinki Committee =

Norwegian human rights organization

- Den norske Helsingforskomité
- Nickname: NHC
- Established: 1977
- Headquarters: Oslo
- Location: Norway
- Secretary-general: Berit Lindeman
- Website: nhc.no

The Norwegian Helsinki Committee (Den norske Helsingforskomité) is a Norwegian human rights non-governmental organization based in Oslo. It was founded in 1977 following the adoption of the Helsinki Accords. It works to ensure that human rights are respected in practice. It was affiliated with the now defunct International Helsinki Federation for Human Rights.

In 2025, the committee was designated as an undesirable organization in Russia.

== Objective ==
The Norwegian Helsinki Committee was founded following the adoption of the Helsinki Accords. Its activities are founded on the principle that the documentation of human rights violations and the presence of a strong civil society is of vital importance in order for states to protect human rights within their borders, as well as abroad. The goal is to contribute to the documentation of human rights violations in the OSCE area, give assistance to individuals and influence governments and international organizations to give priority to human rights. The NHC places particular emphasis on freedom of speech, freedom of association, the right to self-determination, minority rights, the right to freedom of thought and religion, and personal security.

== Activities ==
The work of the Norwegian Helsinki Committee is particularly concerned with states in Europe, Central Asia and North America. In the later years the international work has focused particularly on former Soviet states and the Western Balkans, i.e. the countries of the former Yugoslavia and Albania. Central parts of its activity include monitoring and reporting of human rights violations, human rights education and democracy support in the form of transfer of knowledge and financial support to projects directed by local human rights organizations. The Norwegian Helsinki Committee has also been monitoring and reporting from elections in a wide range of countries, as well as arranged for international election monitoring in Norway.

In addition, the Committee aims at influencing the opinion and authorities concerning current issues, through media statements and participation in the public debate, and putting human rights issues on the public agenda through its own webpage, annual reports and newsletters. The Norwegian Helsinki Committee participates in meetings in the Organization for Security and Cooperation in Europe (OSCE), the Council of Europe and the United Nations. In the recent years, it has also been occupied with promoting the use of international judicial institutions like the European Court of Human Rights and the International Criminal Court in individual cases of principal importance.

The Norwegian Helsinki Committee was affiliated with the International Helsinki Federation for Human Rights (IHF), a self-governing group of 44 national Helsinki Committees and associated organizations in Europe, Central Asia and North America, until the IHF was closed in 2008.
