= Operation Uttaran =

Military operation in Bangladesh

- অপারেশন উত্তরণ; Part of Chittagong Hill Tracts conflict
- Type: Counterinsurgency
- Location: Chittagong Hill Tracts, Bangladesh
- Planned by: 2001 caretaker government
- Commanded by: Government of Bangladesh; Chittagong Hill Tracts Development Board
- Target: Parbatya Chattagram Jana Samhati Samiti; Parbatya Chattagram Jana Samhati Samiti (MN Larma); United People's Democratic Front; United People's Democratic Front (Democratic); Kuki-Chin National Front
- Date: September 2001 – present
- Executed by: Bangladesh Armed Forces; Bangladesh Army; Directorate General of Forces Intelligence; 24th Infantry Division; Border Guard Bangladesh; Bangladesh Ansar; Bangladesh Police; Rapid Action Battalion; Special Branch; National Security Intelligence
- Outcome: Bangladesh Armed Forces' victory: Operation continues; Bangladeshi Forces gains control over key strongholds and de facto military rule is established over the Chittagong Hill Tracts
- Casualties: : 170–200 killed or injured : 96 killed or injured : 64 killed : 10 killed : 2,000 casualties (killed, wounded or captured) : 358 killed (initial phase) : Several killed 50–70 captured or arrested (2022–2024) 3,500–25,000 civilians killed (initial phase); 70,000 externally displaced (initial phase); 100,000 internally displaced

Operation Uttaran (Bengali: অপারেশন উত্তরণ, lit. 'Operation Upliftment') is a counterinsurgency military operation in the Chittagong Hill Tracts, Bangladesh, the operation has been ongoing since September 2001. It replaced Operation Dabanal.

== Background ==
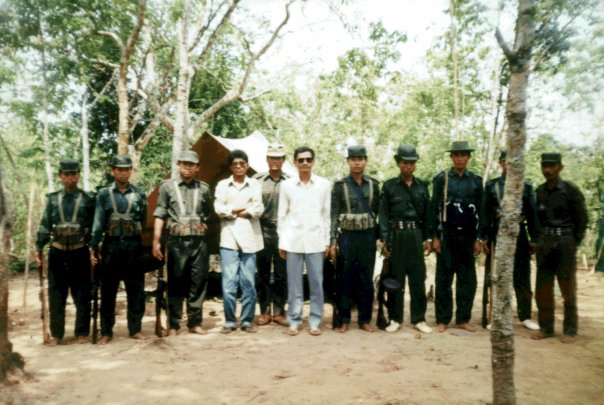
Shanti Bahini militants in Khagrachhari in 1994

Between 1976 and 1978, the Chittagong Hill Tracts Development Board was established with several programmes and deployments and a conflict occurred in the Chittagong Hill Tracts between Bangladeshi security forces and insurgent groups from 1977 to 1997, which resulted in thousands of deaths, arrests and displacements until the Chittagong Hill Tracts Peace Accord in 1997, leading to the end of Operation Dabanal which was launched by the Bangladesh Armed Forces, however the accord was not fully implemented leading to tensions between insurgents and Bangladeshi governments.

== History ==
Operation Uttaran was launched by the caretaker government of Bangladesh in September 2001, After BNP came to power in October 2001 after a victory in the 2001 Bangladeshi general election, Bangladeshi security forces expanded their military operation and raids under its jurisdiction against insurgents in the Chittagong Hill Tracts and Operation Uttaran came into effect. At least one-third of total personnel of the Bangladesh Army were deployed for Operation Uttaran. Operation Uttaran replaced Operation Dabanal and the Bangladeshi administration established de facto military rule in the Chittagong Hill Tracts via Operation Uttaran.

== Administration ==
Under the jurisdiction of Operation Uttaran, Bangladesh Army received 10,000 tons of rice which was used to develop villages for Bengali Muslims in the Chittagong Hill Tracts. After the operation was launched, the military maintained control over local resources, education, judiciary and civil administration. Operation Uttaran allowed the Bangladeshi military and paramilitary to intervene in civil society and political matters in the Chittagong Hill Tracts.

=== Governance ===
After the establishment of CHTDB, the local administration and military have carried out educational and welfare campaigns in the Chittagong Hill Tracts, the Government of Bangladesh was praised for its pro-development programmes. Bangladesh Army was also praised for development programmes in the area.

=== Jurisdiction ===
Development programmes and raids in the Chittagong Hill Tracts are often under the jurisdiction of Operation Uttaran.

== Deployment ==
The Bangladesh Armed Forces was deployed to Operation Uttaran and operations and raids under the jurisdiction of Operation Uttaran began and members of law enforcement and paramilitary organizations were also deployed, the 24th Infantry Division of the Bangladesh Army, the Bangladesh Police and 16 battalions of the Bangladesh Ansar are particularly important in the operation but other security organizations and branches especially RAB, NSI, DGFI, SB were also deployed to the Chittagong Hill Tracts.

== Events ==
- 2001 – Operation Uttaran is launched by the government of Bangladesh
  - September 2001 – the then caretaker government of Bangladesh launched Operation Uttaran
  - October 2001 – The Bangladesh Nationalist Party after a victory in the 2001 Bangladeshi general election, forms a government, and supports Operation Uttaran and as a result, Operation Uttaran comes into effect resulting in massive deployment of troops to the Chittagong Hill Tracts
  - November 2001 – Clashes occurred between Bengali Muslims and Jummas in the Chittagong Hill Tracts and several villages are burnt down and attacked
- 2002 – Bangladesh Army and security forces cracked down on militants in the Chittagong Hill Tracts, hundreds of militants are killed or injured in conflict from 1998 to 2002
  - September 2002 – Bangladesh Army arrests militants in Baghmara Union, Roangchari Thana, Baghicharapara, Amtoli, Saopara
  - November 2002 – Bangladesh Army cracked down on alleged militant hideouts in Khagrachhari
- 2003 – Conflict continues in the Chittagong Hill Tracts and many are killed and raped
  - August 2003 – More than 350 houses in dozens of villages in the Chittagong Hill Tracts housing Jummas were burnt down and attacked and several individuals are killed and 10 women are also raped in those attacks
- 2004–November 2005 – Bangladesh Army and security forces seized 58,000 rounds of ammunition and hundreds of weapons in Bandarban as conflict escalated in the Chittagong Hill Tracts
  - 2004 – Foreign militants from Arakan, Myanmar, abducted a retired Bangladesh Army member and farmer and Bangladesh Police and Bangladesh Army eventually cracked down on militants
    - May 2004 – 50 individuals including activists and militants are arrested in Khagrachhari District by Bangladesh Police
  - 2005 – Tensions in the Chittagong Hill Tracts continue with attacks by militants and crackdowns by Bangladeshi security forces on militant groups
    - April 2005 – Militants abducted Bengali workers in Roangchari, Chittagong Hill Tracts
    - May 2005 – Bangladesh Army launches raids in Bandarban
- 2006 – Clashes occurred in Naniarchar between the Bangladesh Army and Shanti Bahini in which Bangladesh Army soldiers are killed
- 1997–2007 – More than 500 individuals including militants and civilians were killed in the Chittagong Hill Tracts
  - 2008–2013 – Bangladeshi security forces captured hundreds of firearms and more than 2,000 rounds of ammunition in the Chittagong Hill Tracts, and clashes also occur in the Chittagong Hill Tracts
  - February 2010 – Clashes occurred between Bengalis and tribals in the Chittagong Hill Tracts and many individuals were killed
  - May 2011 – UPDF militants were gunned down and killed in Rangamati
  - September 2012 – Clashes occurred between tribals and Bengalis in Rangamati, several institutions were vandalized or burned down including Shevron Diagnostic Center
- 2013 – Dozens of individuals were killed in the Chittagong Hill Tracts and PCJSS, PCJSS (MNL), UPDF commanders were assassinated and clashes occurred between Bengalis and tribes of the Chittagong Hill Tracts
- 2014–2019 – More than 400 individuals including hundreds of militants and civilians in the Chittagong Hill Tracts were killed and many were abducted or arrested and 86 incidents of rape occurred in the Hill Tracts
  - 2014–2015 – Hundreds of individuals including civilians and militants are killed in the Chittagong Hill Tracts
    - August 2015 – Battles occurred between the Bangladesh Armed Forces and the Arakan Army in Bandarban in which casualties occurred on both sides
    - October 2015 – the Bangladesh Police and Border Guard Bangladesh arrested Arakan Army commanders in Rangamati, Chittagong Hill Tracts
  - 2016 – 41 individuals including 23 tribals and militants and civilians were killed in the Chittagong Hill Tracts
    - May 2016 – Mortar fire was exchanged in the Bangladesh-Myanmar border after BGB sites in Bandarban were hit by mortars, Border Guard Bangladesh retaliated by also firing mortar shells towards Myanmar
  - 2017 – 33 individuals in the Chittagong Hill Tracts are killed including UPDF commanders and militants were gunned down in the Chittagong Hill Tracts
  - 2018 – 68 individuals are killed in the Chittagong Hill Tracts including militant commanders and others
    - January–February 2018 – 3 UPDF commanders were gunned down in the Chittagong Hill Tracts
    - March–April 2018 – 5 UPDF militant commanders, 2 PCJSS (MNL) commanders and 2 civilians were gunned down in the Chittagong Hill Tracts
    - May 2018 – The president of UPDF (Democratic), Tapan Jyoti Chakma and leaders of UPDF affiliate organizations were gunned down in the Chittagong Hill Tracts, and almost a dozen UPDF commanders were killed nearby and the chairman of Naniarchar Upazila, Shaktimaan Chakma is also killed
  - 2019 – More than 56 individuals are killed in the Chittagong Hill Tracts including militants
    - January 2019 – Gunfire occurred in Ramgarh, Khagrachhari which resulted in the assassination of a PCJSS-MN Larma commander, Mohan Tripura, in Jagannathpara, Ramgarh, Khagrachhari
    - February 2019 – Gunfire occurred in Kaptai, Rangamati, which resulted in the assassination of PCJSS members and others
    - March 2019 – Shanti Bahini launched an attack on the Bangladesh Police and government, several Bangladeshi security officials and government officials were killed and 16 were injured in the ambush
    - August 2019 – Clashes occurred between the Bangladesh Army and UPDF in Dighinala, Khagrachhari and the clashes led to UPDF militants being killed and the Bangladesh Army launched raids in the area and seized 2 pistols and a few pieces of American equipment with ammunition, and clashes also occurred between the Bangladesh Army and UPDF in Rangamati and the Bangladesh Army assassinated a UPDF commander known as Shantimoy Chakma in retaliation and ambushes also occurred which killed and injured Bangladesh Army personnel, UPDF militants and a few Bangladeshi troops were gunned down in the incident
    - November 2019 – Gunfire occurred in Rangamati where at least 3 people were gunned down, PCJSS was accused of violence but PCJSS denied the claims and accused the Marma Liberation Party, which is also known as Mog Party, of violence in the Chittagong Hill Tracts
- 2020 – Clashes continue in the Chittagong Hill Tracts and many are killed
  - January 2020 – Clashes occurred in Longodu and several PCJSS members were killed
  - March–June 2020 – Incidents of illegal occupation of land and disputes occurred in the Chittagong Hill Tracts and Bangladesh Army cracked down on UPDF and PCJSS arms suppliers in Rangamati
  - July 2020 – PCJSS held protests in Khagrachhari after almost a dozen PCJSS militants were killed in Bandarban
  - October 2020 – The Bangladesh Army and UPDF clashed in Rangamati and many UPDF militants were killed and 1 Bangladesh Army member was injured in the incident
  - December 2020 – Clashes occurred between Bangladeshi security forces and PCJSS militants in Rangamati which resulted in the assassination of PCJSS militants
- 2021 – Clashes occurred between Bengalis and tribals in the Khagrachhari, Chittagong Hill Tracts and rapes and assassinations were reported, and several PCJSS leaders were gunned down in Rangamati
  - December 2021 – Clashes occurred in Rangamati which resulted in the assassination of a PCJSS militant commander and a UPDF militant
- 2022 – Clashes occurred between Bangladeshi security forces and PCJSS, KNF and other militant groups in the Chittagong Hill Tracts
  - February 2022 – Clashes occurred between the Bangladesh Army and PCJSS in Bandarban, several PCJSS militants were killed and Bangladesh Army officers were also killed in the incident
  - March 2022 – Gunfire occurred in Bandarban which resulted in the assassination of a key PCJSS commander, Unumang Royel, the chief collector of PCJSS (MNL)
  - June 2022–September 2022 – Clashes occurred in Dighinala, Khagrachhari which resulted in assassinations of several PCJSS and UPDF leaders
  - November 2022 – Gunfire occurred in Bandarban and 1 DGFI officer was killed and 1 RAB officer was injured in the incident
- 2023 – Heavy battles occur in the Chittagong Hill Tracts and conflict continues
  - February 2023 – Numerous battles and incidents of gunfire results in 25 deaths and crime incidents results in 23 rapes in the Chittagong Hill Tracts, RAB also arrested 17 radical Islamic militants of Jamaatul Ansar and several KNF members in Bandarban, and the Bangladesh Army cracked down on MLP/MNP militants and arrested 5 militants of Marma Liberation Party and seized weapons in Khagrachhari
  - March 2023 – According to reports, a few officers of the Bangladesh Army were killed and army personnel were injured in Bandarban, the incident occurred as a result of gunfire from the Kuki-Chin National Army
  - May 2023 – Two Bangladesh army personnel were killed as a result of explosions of Improvised Explosive Devices (IED) and gunfire from the Kuki-Chin National Army in Bandarban
  - July 2023 – Bangladesh Army and UPDF clashed in Rangamati and a few UPDF militants surrendered and Bangladesh Army seized weapons and German-made equipment
  - September 2023 – Bangladeshi security forces launched a raid in Naniarchar, Rangamati in which hundreds of rounds of ammunition and dozens of firearms and mobile phones were seized and several militants were arrested
  - December 2023 – Battles and gunfire occurred in Khagrachhari resulting in the assassinations of almost a dozen UPDF commanders and militants attacked local BNP members and activists and UPDF launched local boycott campaigns and attacks and Bangladeshi security forces eventually cracks down on local militants and UPDF militant hideouts
- 2024 – Casualties due to conflict in the Chittagong Hill Tracts increases and battles and gunfire continues
  - January 2024 – Gunfire and 2 battles occur in Khagrachhari resulting in the deaths of at least 8 individuals and UPDF members
  - February 2024 – Gunfire and battles occur in Rangamati, resulting in the deaths of several UPDF members and commanders
  - April 2024 – Battles occur between Bangladesh Army and KNF in Bandarban, and at least 2 KNF militants are killed after KNF militants robbed 2 banks and kidnapped individuals and looted arms of Ansar and Police and law enforcement arrested 55 KNF militants including KNF commanders
  - May 2024 – Bangladesh Army kills KNF militants in Bandarban
  - July 2024 – Gunfire occurred in Dighinala, Khagrachhari and one UPDF commander known as Junel Chakma, was killed
  - August–December 2024 – According to the Bangladesh Hindu—Buddhist—Christian Unity Council, at least 174 incidents of communal violence occurred in the Chittagong Hill Tracts where 23 were killed, 9 women were raped, 64 places of worship were vandalized, 38 businesses and homes were vandalized and attacked and 25 incidents of land grabbing occurred and at least 804 sub-inspectors were dismissed and 227 individuals were excluded from Bangladesh Civil Service and more attacks on ethnic minorities occurred and numerous natives were expelled from jobs or service
    - September 2024 – Clashes occur between locals and Bengalis as well as law enforcement and at least 4 are killed in those clashes in Khagrachhari and Rangamati, and Jumma youths also clashed with Bengalis in Rangamati in the following days and eventually the government imposed Section 144
    - October 2024 – Clashes occur between Bengalis and Jummas in Khagrachhari resulting in attacks on businesses, homes and teachers which later resulted in the government banning unauthorised rallies in the area at 1 October 2024, and many UPDF commanders were gunned down in Latiban Union, Panchhari
    - November 2024 – Battles occur between Bangladesh Army and KNF militants in Bandarban, at least 3 KNF militants are killed, Border Guard Bangladesh also launched raids on KNF hideouts and seized arms and ammunition in Bandarban, and battles occurred in Panchhari which resulted in the assassination of 1 UPDF commander who was known as Miton Chakma, an organizer of UPDF
    - December 2024 – 17 homes of Christians in Bandarban are burnt down and attacked
- 2025 – Bangladeshi security forces continue raids and crackdowns under the jurisdiction of Operation Uttaran against KNF and UPDF militants in the Chittagong Hill Tracts
  - January 2025 – Bangladesh Army arrested numerous KNF militants in Bandarban, and killed UPDF militants in raids in Rangamati
  - February 2025 – Law enforcement arrests individuals in Lama, Bandarban and launched raids to rescue 26 abducted workers
  - March 2025 – The Bangladesh Army raided UPDF strongholds in Rangamati and seized weapons, and clashes also occurred in Rangamati and Khagrachhari leading to the assassination of Nirmal Chakma, a key commander of UPDF and a civilian was also killed
  - April 2025 – Bangladesh Army launches raids in Khagrachhari against UPDF militants and captured weapons and targeted militant hideouts, and the Bangladesh Army also launched a cleanliness drive with volunteers and students in Bandarban as part of development programmes in the Chittagong Hill Tracts, and the Arakan Army, a militant group in Myanmar enters 10 kilometers into Thanchi, Bandarban in Bangladesh
  - May 2025 – Bangladesh Police seized 20,000 uniforms and pieces of equipment of KNF and arrested KNF members, and the Bangladesh Army launched raids against UPDF militants in Laxmichari, Khagrachhari and raids resulted in UPDF casualties and capture of arms and ammunition, and 66 Indians enter Khagrachhari
  - June 2025 – Bangladesh Army arrested UPDF militants in Khagrachhari and captured arms supplied by Myanmar, and the Bangladesh Army also launched raids in Rangamati and arrested UPDF militants and also seized weapons, and the Bangladesh Army launched raids in Bandarban and targeted PCJSS-UPDF militant hideouts and arrested UPDF militants, and skirmishes also occurred in Baghaichhari which resulted in the assassination of UPDF members
  - July 2025 – Bangladesh Army launched raids in Ruma, Bandarban against the Kuki-Chin National Army, the military wing of KNF, and the army killed several top KNA commanders and seized equipment, and a battle occurred between the Border Guard Bangladesh and UPDF in Matiranga, Khagrachhari, in which BGB later launched raids and captured 2 rifles, 1 pistol, 1 shotgun and 16 rounds of ammunition, and BGB also arrested Indians in Panchhari
  - August 2025 – The Bangladesh Army arrested UPDF militants in Guimara and arrested militants in Manikchhari in Khagrachhari District and captured pistols, light guns, cartridges and pistol rounds, and also raided UPDF positions in Lakshmichhari in which the army seized 10 lakh taka which originated from extortion by UPDF, and an army raid in Shantinagar resulted in the assassination of top MLP commanders, and the army also seized smuggled Indian products and equipment in Matiranga, and Border Guard Bangladesh arrested Indian citizens for illegal entry in Rangamati, in total, the Bangladesh Army launched 8 intelligence-based operations and several raids on UPDF–MLP targets in which dozens of firearms, loads of ammunition and drugs were captured and dozens of militants were also arrested by the army
  - September 2025 – Bangladesh Army launched raids on KNA strongholds in Ruma, Bandarban and captured equipment, and clashes occurred in Khagrachhari between government forces and Jummas in which a curfew was declared in Khagrachhari following cases of vandalism and attacks on army officers and government establishments after protests, several people were killed from gunfire and a dozen army officers were injured in UPDF gunfire, several shops and markets were set on fire

== Medals ==
Uttaran Padak is the medal provided by the government of Bangladesh for members of Border Guard Bangladesh and Bangladeshi security forces who played an important role in Operation Uttaran against militants in the Chittagong Hill Tracts.

The obverse of Uttoron padak
