= Chakma history =

History of an Indian subcontinent ethnic group

Chakma history (Chakma: 𑄝𑄨𑄎𑄧𑄇𑄴, romanized: History, lit. 'Historiography') is marked by centuries of cultural resilience, migration, and adaptation. The Chakma people, indigenous to the Chittagong Hill Tracts of Bangladesh, India, and Myanmar, are believed to have originated from early Southeast Asian migrations into the hilly terrains of present-day Bangladesh. Over time, they developed a distinct language, customs, and social structures, fostering a rich cultural heritage deeply rooted in oral traditions and local folklore. Although scholars continue to debate their precise origins, archaeological and historical evidence supports the view that the Chakma emerged as a unique ethnic group through gradual settlement and integration with indigenous populations.

Bijak of the Chakmas says that the Chakmas were part of Buddha's Sakya clan. They gradually migrated to Arakan and extended their territory to the nearby hills of the Chittagong Hill Tracts.

During the medieval period, the Chakma organized themselves into small kingdoms and chiefdoms, engaging in trade and diplomatic relations with neighboring states such as the Arakanese and Burmese kingdoms. These interactions facilitated cultural exchange and led to the establishment of governance systems that allowed the Chakma to maintain a degree of autonomy amid shifting regional powers. The arrival of European colonial powers in South Asia in the 18th century further transformed their society, as British administrative policies restructured traditional landholding and local governance.

The partition of British India in 1947 resulted in significant geopolitical changes, relegating the Chakma to a minority status within East Pakistan, which later became Bangladesh. The construction of the Kaptai Dam in the 1960s, which flooded vast areas of the Chittagong Hill Tracts, displaced thousands of Chakma people and intensified their struggle for land rights and cultural recognition. Today, the Chakma continue to advocate for their rights and work to preserve their heritage through cultural revival initiatives and political activism. Their enduring history, characterized by adaptability and resilience, stands as a testament to their ongoing commitment to maintaining a vibrant cultural identity for future generations. Their legacy remains a source of inspiration across South Asia.

The Chakma people are one of the largest indigenous communities primarily residing in the Chittagong Hill Tracts of Bangladesh as well as in parts of India and Myanmar. They are known for their unique language, rich cultural heritage, and traditional practices that have evolved over centuries. Their history reflects a legacy of migration, adaptation, and resilience in the face of external political and social pressures.

== Origins and early history ==
Chakma history is marked by dynamic migratory movements and complex cultural interactions. The origins of the Chakma have long been a subject of debate, with many researchers proposing that their ancestors were part of early Southeast Asian migratory waves that moved into the Chittagong Hill Tracts of present‐day Bangladesh.

Chakmas are likely descendants of ancient Tibeto-Tibetans of Southwest China most likely from the Qiang (Chinese: 羌; pinyin: Qiāng). One of the descendant groups of the Qiang were the pinyin: Qiongdu which in Old Chinese is analgous to Kontu or Kondu. Early British colonial scholars argued that the Qiongdu derived Kadu people entered Burma through the passes north of Bhamo. The Kadyu became the mot powerful tribe of te Chindwin and contributed to the formation of the Bamar people. According to Fan Chuo's Man Shu (Chinese: 蛮书), a polity known as the little Brahmin Kingdom (Chinese: 小婆罗门国) discuss that it maintains close relations with Big Ears Kingdom (Chinese: 大耳国). Luce argues that these big-eared people in Burma were the early Kadu, who had a tradition of wearing heavy earrings and stretching their lobes.

Archaeological excavations in the region have uncovered artifacts and settlement remnants dating back several centuries, indicating that these hills served as a corridor for migrating groups. Genetic studies further support this view by revealing close affinities between the Chakma and other indigenous Southeast Asian populations, suggesting a shared ancestry among these early settlers.

Oral traditions within the Chakma community recount epic journeys and the gradual settlement of their ancestors in the challenging, forested highlands. These narratives, passed down through generations, underscore a profound connection to the land that is echoed in material culture unearthed at various archaeological sites. Early cultural artifacts—including pottery, tools, and ornamental items—reflect the technological ingenuity and adaptive strategies that allowed the Chakma to thrive in a rugged environment. Over time, interactions between these early migrants and pre-existing local populations led to the emergence of a unique cultural identity, blending external influences with indigenous traditions.

Historical records suggest that the early Chakma society was organized into small chiefdoms or tribes, which engaged in trade and maintained diplomatic ties with neighboring groups such as the Arakanese. These relationships fostered cultural exchange and helped shape the social and political structures of early Chakma communities. This formative period laid the groundwork for the distinct language, customs, and societal organization that define the Chakma people today. Ongoing archaeological and ethnographic research continues to enrich our understanding of this early phase, highlighting the resilience and adaptability that have long characterized the Chakma heritage.

== Medieval period and kingdoms ==
During the medieval period, the Chakma organized themselves into chiefdoms and small kingdoms that maintained local systems of governance. They engaged in trade and diplomacy with neighboring states such as the Arakanese and Burmese kingdoms. These interactions promoted cultural exchange and influenced the social and administrative structures of the Chakma community.

According to Luce, the Kadu lived in the upper central Myanmar region as the Tagaung Kingdom with Tagaung as its capital. Sak villages were also found further south such as Sak Munalwan (transl. village of the Saks) and Sak-cuiw (transl. Mountain of the Saks). The Glass Palace Chronicle also states that a Sak settlements is mentioned as the "mount of the Theks" in the Kingdom of Macchagiri. Local Sak history states a king name Cho-phru settled and ruled the hill in the Turang mountains (Tuiwindaung) near Pagan.

The next major record of the Chakma people are those located in Tagaung during the Mongol invasions of Burma. The Yuan History Chroncile recorded the Jiandu (Chinese: 建都; pinyin: Jiàndū) people, as holed up in the nest of Tagaung. Similarly, Marco Polo recorded of the Caindu people in his book Travels of Marco Polo. Scholars have argued the Jiandu (Khontu) and the Caindu were the same ethnic group. The Mongol recrds mention that a general was killed by the Jiandu in 1264. The Mongols sen a punitive expedtion and captured twelve towns stating that the land of the Jiandu were abundant with gold and had a fundry established. Records also mention Jiandu in the territory of Yuexi, which the Mongols named Jianchang (now Xichang in Liangshan Yi Autonomous Prefecture). Marco Polo's records state that the Caindu reside in the upper part of the River Brius, which is equated to the Yangzi River in the area between Sichuan, Yunnan, and Tibet. Hence, indicating that the Caindu and Jiandu were originally Southwestern Chinese inhabitants. The other branch of the Jiandu was the Burmese-ruled Jiandu of Tagaung. Burmese records claim the kingdom of the Kantu was known as Santhway Pran with their capital at Tagaung. Later on, the expansion of the Bamar people and the Shans led to political centralization and agricultural growth in the Irrawaddy and Chindwin valleys. This also meant many groups were forced to migrate west and south. According to the Mahārāzāweng (Royal Chronicle of the Kings of Burma) the Saks were located West of the Chindwin River.

== Arakan Era ==
The Arakanese people referred to the Chakmas as Saks, Theks, or Thaikhs. In 1546 CE, while the Arakanese king Min Bin was fighting a battle with the Burmese, the Sak king attacked Northern Arakan Roma and occupied the Arakanese-controlled Chacomas of the Northern Arakan Mountains.

According to the Arakanese Chronicles, King Tsulatheng Tsandya (Śūraśiṃhacandra) of Waithali Kingdom died as the last ruler of the Candra dynasty. This death prompted two Mru chiefs to briefly rule Waithali for a period and allowed the Saks to consolidate their power under Nga-Maung-Kadon in the northern Arakan region of Sambowet in Pyinsa and Lemro. Legends of Nga-Maung-Kadon claim that he was the posthumous son of Tsulatheng Tsandya who raiswed among the Sak tribe (which they called Thek) in the hills of the upper course of the Mayu River. Theories have been proposed that the Buddhist Saks allied themselves with the declining Candra dynasty and that the 10th century oversaw Sak domination in the Arakan region briefly with their seat of power at Sambowet. The king Nga-Maung-Kadon was killed in 1018AD when resisting a Burmese invasion. His head was severed and displayed as a trophy, which was mentioned in the Glass Palace Chronicles as the name "Thekminkaton" (King of the Saks), where his head was decapitated and presented to the Burmese King. Following the Burmese takeover of Arakan, the Saks left the Lemro region. Burmese Chronicles allege following this that some Kanran and Sak groups migrated into Prome, which is recorded in Burmese inscriptions depicting the Saks in the vicinity of the Pagan Kingdom. Luce argues that the Old Burmese title of Mahā-sak-thit meant the "Terror of the Sak" which explains the constant tension between the two groups. The Saks of Macchhagiri eventually became an issue, leading to war with the Burmese. The Glass Palace Chronicle records the events of this encounter.

Macchagiri is said to have rebelled when Yazathingyan of Pagan went into exile. When he was recalled, an army of two hundred elephants, two thousand horses and twenty thousand soldiers were assembled against Macchagiri. However, the army was poorly disciplined and fled in haste. A second army under four generals (Yazathingyan, Tharevadanna, Sitturbinko and Sitturinkathu) were deployed. Four thousand elephants, forty thousand horses and four hundred thousand men were sent to Macchagiri. The outlying settlements and villages were razed to the ground. The Macchagiri king waited on the mount of the Theks and surrendered. Chakma accounts also claim this story. Their narrative focuses on the period during the Arakan reign of Mangthi (Mengdi), son of Mang Bhilu (Meng-Bhilu). Yengcho ruled the Saks and held court at Macchagiri as a ruler. Four generals were dispatched to the kingdom with a beautiful maiden. A messenger was sent to Yengcho that King Mangthi offered his sister Brahmi's hand in marriage and agreed on 12 February 1333. A general of Arakan was arranged and led ten thousand mecernaries as an escort for Brahmi to Macchagiri. Yengcho who became captivated with her beauty lost sight of managing his state affairs and army. Hence the four generals took advantage and surrounded the capital. While the Saks rested, the army took Yengcho, his three queens, two sons (Chophru and Chothung) and two daughters captive. Chochung however escaped and took refuge with the Burmese king. Yengcho was made a tributary ruler of Kyathkya and his sons were made governors of Ming and Kang provinces. The Saks were thus in disarray as a result and were resettled on the Aeng and Ro rivers. Chakma traditions claim that Prince Chothung later settled in the Chittagong Hill Tracts where some Sas followed him and settled in Yangcha and Gengowa in the Lama subdvision. However some Saks remained in Arakan. Chakma groups maintain folklore stories that during migration, one camp took too long to cook their fish and thus were left behind and explained the reason for disaporic populations. This folklore is used among the Saks of Manipur and the Daingnaks of Sittwe.

Diego de Astor created a map of Bengal, which was published as Descripção do Reino de Bengalla in the book Quarta decada da Asia (Fourth decade of Asia) by João de Barros in 1615. The map shows an area named Chacomas on the eastern bank of the Karnaphuli River in what is now Chittagong Bangladesh, suggesting that the Chakmas inhabited this area during the time.

The Arakan king Min Razagyi (1593–1612) conquered the areas and styled himself as the highest and most powerful king of Arakan, Chacomas, and Bengal. This was identified in a 1607 letter to the Portuguese mercenary Filipe de Brito e Nicote. Similarly, the Portuguese cartographer Diego de Astor made a map of Bengal published in the book Qarta decada da Asia (transl. Fourth Decade of Asia) by Joao de Barros in 1605 with a location labelled "Chacomas" on the Karnaphuli River. After their defeat by the Arakanese, the Chakmas migrated to the present Chittagong Hill Tracts and founded their capital city Alekyangdong (present-day Alikadam). From Alekyangdong, they continued north and settled in present-day Rangunia, Raozan, and Fatikchari Upazilas of Chittagong District.

Chak and Marma traditions claim that the Sak migration to Chittagong occurred during the late 14th or early 15th century. An Arakan Chronicle Dhagnawadi Areḥdopũ mentions that a group of Saks entered Chittagong at the beginning of the 15th century. Mangrekyaz the son of Maungswe and Sak king of Maunzamru were at war with the king of Arakan but were defeated and forced to migrate to Chittagong where the Muslim governor permitted them to settle in twelve villages. According to Chakma history, in the early 15th century, a group of Saks joined forces with the Baruas (Bengali Buddhists) from Chittagong and attempted to gian control of the upper Koladyne during the period of unrest in Arakan. However, they were defeated by the Arakanese. The Daingnets joined their alliance and entered the war as well. The Daingnet migrated to the Matamuri valley while the Min Sak Chakma group were left at Sa-cuḥ-tong. The Tanchangya people record in oral tradition various memories of the Arakan War. Their oral history also record how the first of thir people settled in Chittagong were known as Sāppye. In 1418, many Arakan Saks travelled through the forrested frontier and arrived at Alikadam. The Governor of Chittagong, Jamal-ud-din permitted them to establish homes in twelve villages known as Bāra Tāluk (transl. the twelve tāluks) which were renamed from the twelve gosās settled there already.

The Tanchangya gained their name as they settled in the Tain Chari in the hill tracts. The Daingnets settled in the mountains south of the Marma areas, and the Mrus resided in the middle of the hill tracts of the Karnaphuli region. The Buddhist Saks traditionally dominated the southern part of the hill tracts and had influence over the native mountain people, the Daingnet and the Tanchangya. The Tannchangya claim that migrations of people further west led to the making of the modern Chakma people. The Chakma and Tanchangya were once one people, and the Chakma identity consolidated when Dhabana became king. The Tanchangya refer to the Chakma as Ānokyā (transl. those who live west).

The Chakma began to develop their political system in Chittagong with the leadership of four chiefs belonging to four different Kingship groups: Dhurjya (Bogā gojhā), Kurjya (Tainnyā gojhā), Pirabhanga (Dhāmei gojā) and Dhabana (Mulimā gojhā). The Baruā or Barbwa gojhā was a fifth kinship group that had a line of rājās to the Matamuri Saks; however was excluded from sharing political power. The last ruler in the Barua lineage was Sattwa also known as the Pagla Raja. The king was killed in a popular revolt against his madness. His widow Kattwa Rani fled to Fatikchari with her sons and daughter and formed relations with the Tipperah King. The Tripura King wedded Kattwa's daughter Amangali and produced Pirabhanga of the dhāmei gojhā. Kattwa Rani returned to the hill tracts later with mercenaries and became the Chamka chieftainess. After her death, her two sons became co-rulers but were killed by aristocrats. During a period of uncertainty, as Chakma nobles conspired against each other, Dhabana became the Chakma chief with the assistance of the Marmas. The Rājnāmā states that Dhabana fostered solidarity among the ethnic groups of Chakma, Tippera, Kuki, Tanchangya, Riang, Murung, Mags and Khyangs and bestowed titles on chiefs of the tribes.

During the struggle between the Mughals and Afghans for supremacy in Bengal, the Chakmas experienced a period known as Mughar Mulluk (transl. lawless country). Sultan Shuja, son of Shah Jehan ruled the Bengal region and restricted the Arakanese raids and incursions. However, Aurangzeb defeated Shuja, who fled to Arakan and was executed in refuge.

In 1666, the Mughal Governor of Bengal, Shaista Khan, defeated the Arakanese, conquered Chittagong, and renamed it Islamabad. Mughal rule, however, was confined to the plain areas of Chittagong early on, leaving the Chakmas largely unaffected. The Mughals eventually demanded tribute from the Chakmas after a trade dispute developed between the two groups.

In 1713, the conflict was resolved, and a stable relationship developed between the Chakmas and the Mughals; the latter never demanded complete subjugation of the former. The Mughals also rewarded the Chakma king Shukdev Roy; he established a new capital in his name in an area still known as Shukbilash. Ruins of the royal palace and other historic buildings still exist. Subsequently, the capital was shifted to Rajanagar, Ranirhat, Rangunia Upazila, Chittagong District.

The Mughals signed a treaty with Jallal Khan, Raja of the Chakma, in 1715. While the Mughals controlled significant amounts of yam and cotton crops in the Chittagong Hill Tracts (CHT), the Chakma's independence from the Mughals was recognised.

== Chakmas under colonial rule ==
=== Anglo-Chakma War ===
Encroachments on the Chittagong Hill Tracts by the British led to a protracted war between the East India Company and the Chakmas from 1777 to 1787. The East India Company launched four offensives against the Chakmas in 1770, 1780, 1782 and 1785. The Governor of Bengal Warren Hastings adopted leniency and began to negotiate terms with the Chakmas. In 1785, the Company started peace negotiations with the Chakma king Jan Baksh Khan, son of Sher Doulat Khan. In 1787 a peace treaty was signed in Calcutta. The tributes system was slashed to a minimum and the annual revenue for the CHT was fixed at ₹1,852 until 1789. Raja Jan Baksh Khan pledged loyalty to the British in exchange for autonomy in administering Chakma territory.

The main provisions of the treaty between Governor-General Lord Cornwallis and the Chakma king were as follows:

- The East India Company recognised Jan Baksh Khan as the Raja of the Chakmas
- It was agreed that revenue collection was the responsibility of the Raja
- The British government would preserve tribal autonomy and migration from the plains would be restricted
- Jan Baksh Khan was bound by the treaty to maintain peace in his territory
- British troops would remain in the Chakma territory, not to terrify the Chakmas but to protect the land from hostile tribes

In 1829, Halhed, then Commissioner of Chittagong, reaffirmed that:

The hill tribes were not British subjects but merely tributaries and we recognized no right on our part to interfere with their internal arrangements. The near neighborhood of a powerful and stable government naturally brought the chiefs by degree under control and every leading chief paid to the Chittagong collector a certain tribute or yearly gifts. These sums were at first fluctuating in amount but gradually were brought to a specific and fixed limit, eventually taking the shape not of tribute but of revenue to the state.

Jan Baksh Khan shifted his capital to a new place near present-day Rangunia, naming it Rajanagar. After Jan Baksh's death in 1800, his son Tabbar Khan became king but died shortly after. In 1802, Tabbar Khan's younger brother Jabbar Khan became king and ruled for ten years. After his death, his son Dharam Baksh Khan became king in 1812 and ruled until his death in 1832. Without any male heir, the government appointed Suklal Dewan as manager. Rani Kalindi, the widow of Dharam Baksh Khan, applied to the government to allow her to run state affairs. The government accepted her application and in 1844 issued an order to that effect.

After the great Sepoy Mutiny in 1857, the British government assumed direct control of the administration of India, including the Chittagong Hill Tracts, which were not yet formally separated from Chittagong, from the East India Company. The territorial jurisdiction of the Chakma Raja, however, was fixed by a proclamation dated 6th Shraavana 1170M.S (1763 CE) by the company as "All the hills from the Feni River to the Sangoo and from Nizampur Road in Chittagong to the hills of Kooki Raja".

During this era, Kalindi (rani) ruled the Chakma Circle of the CHT after succeeding Raja Dharam Bux Khan who died in 1832 without a male heir. Kalindi Rani sided with the East India Company during the mutiny and delivered troops captured from the mutiny who had been stationed in Chittagong.

After the war with the British, the Chakmas became very weak militarily. The Lushai used to make frequent raids on British subjects because their hunting ground was converted to tea gardens by the British in Cachar, Noakhali, Comilla, and other neighbouring tracts under Rani Kalindi. They raided the Chittagong Hill Tracts and the neighbouring tracts in 1847, 1848, 1859, and 1860. As a consequence, with a view to paying attention to the areas experiencing repeated raids and to protecting the people from the aggression of the independent tribes living further east but primarily to occupy the Chakma land, the Lieutenant Governor of Bengal recommended the removal of the hill tracts from the regulation district and the appointment of a superintendent over the tribes. Both of these recommendations were adopted by Act XXII in 1860, which came into effect on 18 August of that year.

The frontier situation put pressure on the Chakma chief to shift his capital, and in 1874, he did so, from Rajanagar to Rangamati. At that time, cotton was grown in the Chittagong Hill Tracts and was important to the British for their mills, so effective control of the Chittagong Hill Tracts was also important for them.

In 1881, the government divided the Chittagong Hill Tracts into Chakma Circle, Bohmong Circle, and Mong Circle. Each circle was headed by a chief. Chakma circle was headed by a Chakma, Bohmong circle by a Bohmong and the Burmese circle by a Mong. The Chakma circle was centrally located and inhabited mainly by the Chakmas, the Bohmong circle was under the rule of a Bohmong chief of Arakanese extraction, and the Mong circle was also inhabited by Arakanese speaking clans with some Tripura immigrants and headed by another ruler of Arakanese extraction. The division occurred because the British government was not in favour of the power of the Chakma chief, who controlled the hill tribes. Further, the government was increasingly concerned about the political and administrative affairs of the tracts. Hence, they wished to lay the foundation of administration in a restricted manner with the following objectives:

- To supervise the rule of the Chakma chief and curtail some of his powers
- To protect British subjects from the Kuki (the name given to the Lushai by the British)
- To preserve peace in the frontier areas so cotton could be grown and made available for British mills

After the creation of a separate district and the three circles, the Kuki (Lushai) threat to the Chittagong Hill Tracts and other adjoining areas did not stop. The Shendus made occasional raids in the Hill Tracts between 1865 and 1888 and killed many people, including Lt. Steward and his survey party. In 1872, 1,890 military offensives were launched simultaneously into Lushai Hills (Mizoram) from Chittagong district and Burma in collaboration with the governments of Bengal, Assam and Burma, and the whole of the CHT was brought under British control.

Autonomous police forces were created by the Hill Tract tribes in 1881. Tribals complained to Britain after the Hill Tracts experienced attempts at penetration by lowlander Bengali Muslims.

Later, the British, through the Deputy Commissioner, took over absolute control of the Chittagong Hill Tracts (including the Chakma circle) after the implementation of the Chittagong Hill Tracts manual. The Chittagong Hill Tracts (Lushai Hills) were again designated an "Excluded Area" under the Government of India Act 1935.

Local tribes demanded an independent state for the Chittagong Hill Tract because Bengalis and the tribals did not share a religion, language, or ethnicity, and they asked for their own independent area in the 1930s when the Indian national movement was launched. During World War II, to retain Chakma loyalty in the face of Japanese advances, local British officials guaranteed the tribals that the Chittagong Hill Tracts would be split of separately in the event of Indian independence.

=== Chakma Circle and other circles ===
To consolidate control over the region, the British established a system of administrative divisions, including the Chakma Circle and several other local circles. The Chakma Circle was designated as a focal area for local governance and revenue collection, often replacing traditional communal systems with centralized bureaucratic controls. In addition to the Chakma Circle, other administrative circles were established to manage diverse indigenous communities, further integrating them into the colonial state apparatus. These newly formed circles not only streamlined colonial governance but also contributed to the erosion of long-standing traditional structures within the Chakma community.

== Partition and the post-colonial era ==
In British India, there was a measure of security and protection afforded to the non-Muslim and non-Bengali Chittagong Hill Tract Chakmas and other tribal people. Bengal and Assam did not govern the CHT during this period. Rather the CHT was a distinct administrative unit that enjoyed a large degree of self-rule.

Despite the CHT being 97.2–98.5% non-Muslim, it was given to Pakistan by the Boundary Commission Chairman Sir Cyril Radcliffe in 1947 upon independence. Native Chakmas made up most of the officials except for some British during British India rule. Pakistan received the CHT from Radcliffe after the issue of Punjab districts and the CHT revised boundaries were pushed onto him by Lord Mountbatten on 17 August 1947. The decision by Radcliffe to draw this boundary paved the way for future war, violence, and conflict. The 1956 Pakistani Constitution, which designated the CHT as an "excluded area," kept things as they were. It was the fact that the CHT was governed under a different set of rules since 1900 in order to prevent mainlanders from acquiring ownership of the tribal land. The CHT underwent a significant change when the Pakistani armed forces overthrew the government in 1958 and renamed the protected area "Tribal Area." Finally, the 1962 Constitution was amended in 1963 to repeal the earlier designation, making the CHT accessible to all non-tribals. As a result, Chakmas' jhum cultivation was hampered, and numerous unauthorised settlers invaded this territory. The Bangladeshi Constitution does not refer to any group (inclusive of Bengalis) as indigenous.

As in India's Tripura State, the Chakmas lived in Bangladesh before it gained its independence. Recent migrations of ethnic Bengalis into traditionally Chakma regions of Bangladesh have raised tensions in the Chittagong Hill Tracts. Successive governments have dealt forcefully with Chakma uprisings and finally ended the conflict with the 1997 peace treaty. This force and the construction of Kaptai Dam by the then-Pakistan government in Chakma areas which submerged cultivable lands and displaced thousands resulted in the migration during 1964–1969 of a large population of Chakmas into Diyun, Arunachal Pradesh.

Many Buddhist Chakmas migrated from East Pakistan (now Bangladesh) to India. Projects for infrastructure development negatively impacted CHT tribals starting in the 1950s. These included the Kaptai Dam hydro-electric project, built-in 1959–1963 by the Pakistan government, with the assistance of the United States Agency for International Development, to provide electricity for much of East Pakistan. The project flooded forty per cent of the farmland in the Chittagong Hill Tracts and displaced nearly 100,000 Chakmas. About sixty per cent were resettled, and forty per cent fled to India. Chakmas made up 90% of the 10,000 people whose 54,000 acres of farmland were flooded in 1962 by the Karnafuli power plant and Kaptai Dam. Inept relocation and insufficient compensation were offered to the Chakmas. India used NEFA as a resettlement area for Chakma refugees.

The Chittagong Hill Tracts Chakma population was estimated at 250,000 in 1964. The CHT was described as being hilly, forested, a verdant green landscape filled with fountains of water. A deputy commissioner administered the Chittagong Hill Tracts Division under Pakistani rule.

Manabendra Narayan Larma requested autonomy in 1970. Tripura state had to deal with the issue of Chakma families. Agriculture, employment, and education are dominated by Chakmas compared to Arunachal natives because they are more skilled and have a higher literacy rate. The issue of returning Chakma refugees from India to Bangladesh was raised in 1995. The hill tribes' conflict with Bangladesh caused the exodus of 50,000 Chakmas to India from the Chittagong Hill Tracts. A 1992 deal between India and Bangladesh arranged that Bangladesh would take them back. A March 1997 agreement between Chakma leaders and Bangladesh provided for the repatriation to Bangladesh of Chakma refugees in Tripura. Both East Pakistan's partition and Bangladesh's independence caused an influx into India of Chakma refugees. In the 1960s, hundreds of Muslim families from other parts of East Pakistan were resettled in the Matamuhuri Valley region of Alikadam, Feni Valley regions of Belchari and Tulanchari, and the regions of Lama, Bandarban, and Ramgarh.

Tridev Roy continued to collaborate with Pakistani forces and declined to join the freedom movement of Bangladesh. Pakistani president Yahya Khan assigned a south-east Asian diplomatic post to Tridiv Roy during the war as a reward for his collaboration. Roy chose the Pakistani side, fearing that an independent Bangladesh would likely have democratic rule and he might lose his feudal interests. Pakistan retained his support and allegiance, Roy agreed on 25 March, and in exchange British artillery would refrain from shelling the CHT capital, Rangamati. Roy believed Bangladesh would not award autonomy to CHT and the Chakmas and earned the enmity of the Awami League by rejecting Sheikh Mujibur Rahman's offer to stand as the Awami League candidate. Autonomy was refused to the CHT tribals. CHT hills people were enrolled as Mujahids and Razakars by the Pakistan army during the Bangladesh Liberation War of 1971.

The Bangladesh government provided financial support for thousands of Bengalis to settle in the tracts. By 1981, a third of the population of the tracts were Bengali migrants. Parbatya Chattagram Jana Samhati Samiti (PCJSS; Chittagong Hill Tracts Peoples Solidarity Association), which was founded by Chakmas, demanded a halt to Bengali settlement, settlers returning lands to CHT natives, and autonomy. On 7 January 1973, Shanti Bahini (Peace Force) was founded as the military army of PCJSS. In an effort to win independence for the Chittagong Hill Tracts, the Shanti Bahini launched guerrilla attacks against the government. Jumma guerrillas made up of Shanti Bahini forces. The party heads of PCJSS are mostly Chakma because of their 59% literacy rate, which is more than other CHT tribes, so they control the PCJSS.

During the war, most of the Pahadis remained passive, although the Mukti Bahini enrolled some. In 1971, the Pakistan army enrolled CHT hill men. After the war, Tridev Roy maintained his allegiance to Pakistan, which he supported in the war. In 1970, he served as independent in the Parliament of Pakistan while serving as Raja of the Chakma. The Awami League candidate Sheikh Mujibur Rahman lost the election to Roy. Roy was in Southeast Asia when Bangladesh came under Indian army control in December 1971. Bhutto assigned the position of Minorities Affairs Minister to Roy and he helped lobby the United Nations (UN) for Pakistan after the war. The post of ambassador and tourism was also awarded to Roy. Roy represented Pakistan when it protested at the UN over Bangladesh. Pakistan retained the allegiance of only Nurul Amin and Tridiv Roy among their East Pakistan MPs. Roy refused to join Bangladesh because the hill tracts were not granted autonomy and stayed on Pakistan's side despite Mujib trying to urge Tridiv to quit Pakistan.

=== Partition of Chakmas ===
Following the partition of British India in 1947, the Chakma people became a minority in the newly formed East Pakistan, which later became Bangladesh. The redrawing of national boundaries brought profound political, economic, and social changes that adversely impacted the Chakma community. These changes intensified the Chakmas' struggle for self-determination and cultural preservation in a rapidly shifting geopolitical landscape.

=== Kaptai Dam ===
In the 1960s, the construction of the Kaptai Dam in East Pakistan led to the flooding of vast areas of the Chittagong Hill Tracts, displacing thousands of Chakmas from their ancestral lands. The dam's construction disrupted traditional livelihoods and precipitated a profound socio-economic and cultural transformation within the Chakma community. This environmental and economic upheaval had lasting impacts, reshaping Chakma society and intensifying their struggle for land rights and recognition.

=== Refuge to India ===
Meghalaya and Tripura were destinations of Buddhist Chakma refugees fleeing from the war started by plains-dwelling Muslim Bangladeshis settling the CHT, as well as the government of Bangladesh implementing a military police force to expel Chittagong Hill Tracts natives. "The Muslim World" complained about alleged immigration from Bangladesh to Arakan by Buddhists of Magh and Chakma background.

In 1974, the Garo people were stripped of their property by the XLVI Vested and Non-President Property Act by Bangladesh and affected by the 1964 Enemy Property Ordinance. Lands in CHT were taken by Bengali colonists; the hill peoples of the CHT were not afforded any cultural or ethnic recognition, and sympathy from successive Bangladesh governments, despite culture and ethnicity being used as an argument against Pakistan by Bengalis during the war. A 1997 peace agreement ended the over the twenty-year-long war on autonomy between Bangladesh and the Chittagong Hill Tracts Jumma inhabitants. The Chittagong Hill Tracts showed that only Bengalis were to be beneficiaries of Bengali nationalism and its "liberalism", which was aimed against the hegemony of Pakistan. Even the "pro-minority" and participant of the CHT peace agreement, the Awami League, refused to grant the status of Adibashi, declaring that according to the constitution, Bengali is the nationality and Bangladeshi is citizenship and refused to acknowledge that Bangladesh had indigenous people. Bengali nationalism is part of the BNP's ideology. Jumma nationalism was spawned from Bengali nationalism due to the hegemony exerted by the Bengalis.

The rights of CHT natives were ignored when the Rangmati Kaptai Dam was built. Because the CHT Jummas were apathetic towards Bangladeshi independence, the Bengali majority regarded them as disloyal. No autonomy was awarded to the Chittagong Hill Tracts in the Bangladesh Constitution of 1972. The Chakma conflict is both a religious and ethnic problem in Bangladesh. The Chittagong Hill Tracts saw tribal Chakma leave the area due to religious and ethnic strife caused by Bangladesh's Islamisation policy. The Chittagong Hill Tracts was colonised by Northern Burmese and Bangladeshi Muslims. The label "genocidal" has been used to describe actions by the Bangladeshi government upon the non-Islamic Chittagong Hill Tracts Jumma natives.

In February 1972, the Prime Ministers of India and Bangladesh issued a joint statement by virtue of which the government of India decided to confer citizenship on the Chakmas under Section 5(1)(a) of the Citizenship Act, 1955 but the state of Arunachal Pradesh had reservations. Chakmas were thus allowed to be rehabilitated. The Election Commission of India framed guidelines to enable Chakmas to have the right to vote by having their names enrolled in the electoral rolls of the constituency where they have been settled. The persecution of the ethnic tribes of the Chittagong Hill Tracts, of which the Chakma are the predominant ethnicity, has been greatly reduced after the 1997 Chittagong Hill Tracts Peace Accord.

== Modern developments and cultural revival ==
In recent decades, the Chakma community has launched initiatives to revive and preserve their language, traditions, and cultural heritage. Political movements have emerged advocating for greater autonomy, legal rights, and recognition within Bangladesh, India, and Myanmar. Cultural festivals, educational programs, and media projects have become essential in promoting Chakma identity among the younger generation.

The history of the Chakma people is marked by resilience, cultural adaptation, and the continual struggle for recognition and self-determination. A comprehensive understanding of their past is essential for appreciating the broader context of indigenous rights and cultural diversity in South Asia.

The Chakmas now have representation in the Mizoram Legislative Assembly, Tripura Legislative Assembly and Tripura Tribal Areas Autonomous District Council. The only seat of political power and identity is the Chakma Autonomous District Council in India, the legitimacy of which is questioned by the Mizo people. There are another 80,000 Chakmas in Rakhine state, Myanmar, who are known as Daingnet people.

In September 2015, the Supreme Court of India passed a judgment directing the government of India and of Arunachal Pradesh to grant Indian citizenship rights to all of the Chakmas, holding that they cannot be discriminated against any other Indian.

== Sources ==
- Chakma, Ananda Bikash (2015). "Partition of India, Incorporation of Chittagong Hill Tracts into Pakistan and the Politics of Chakmas". Journal of the Pakistan Historical Society. 63 (2).
- Debnath, Rupak (2025). The Chakma Language Growth and Structure. Delhi: Akansha Publishing House.
- Jhala, Angma Dey (2019). An Endangered History: Indigeneity, Religion and Politics on the Borders of India, Bruma and Bangladesh. New Delhi: Oxford University Press. ISBN 978-0-19-909691-6.
- Ping, He (2006). "Rise and fall of Kantu: A historical study of an ancient Tibeto-Burman speaking group[" (PDF). Frontier Histories of China. 4 (1): 535−543. doi:10.1007/s11462-006-0018-9.
- Qanungo, Suniti Bhushan (1998). Chakma Resistance to British Domination. Chittagong: Shanti Press.
