= Operation Dabanal =

Operation by Bangladesh Army

- Part of Chittagong Hill Tracts conflict
Date	1977 to 1997
Location	Bangladesh
Territorial changes	Chittagong Hill Tracts

Operation Dabanal, translation Operation Wildfire, was a counterinsurgency operation carried out by Bangladesh Army in the Chittagong Hill Tracts from 1977 to 1997. During the operation, an estimated 30 to 80 thousand security personnel were deployed to the region.

== Background ==
Chittagong Hill Tracts is a hilly region of Bangladesh. This region had changed hands many times. The Kingdom of Arakan took it over in 953, Kingdom of Tripura in 1240, and reconquered by Arakan in 1575 who lost it 1666 after a war with the Mughals. It remained a contested territory between the two Kingdoms. From 1666 to 1760, it was ruled by the Mughal Empire who ceded it the British East India Company. In 1860, the region was taken over by the British Raj and made part of British India. It was the British who named the region as the Chittagong Hill Tracts as they saw it as an extension of Chittagong District and placed it under the Province of Bengal. The land south was called Arakan Hill Tracts and the land north was called Hill Tippera. Chittagong Hill Tracts Regulation created a tax collection system in 1900.

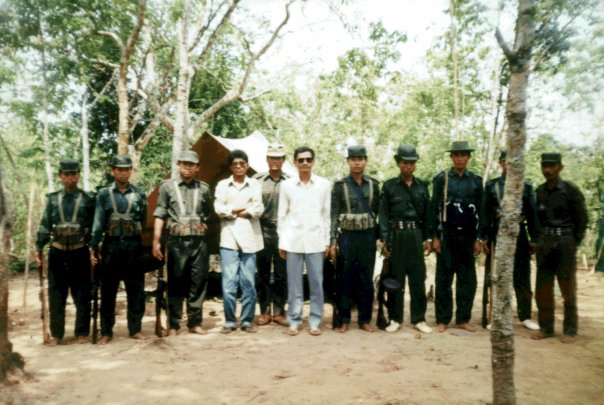
Shanti Bahini insurgents, 1994.

After the Partition of India, the Chittagong Hill Tracts became a part of Pakistan. It became part of Bangladesh after the independence of Bangladesh. Unlike the rest of Bangladesh, it was neither Bengali nor Muslim majority. Most of the inhabitants followed Buddhism and Hinduism. In the 1980s, the government of Bangladesh divided it into three districts, Bandarban District, Khagrachari District, and Rangamati District. In 1989, the government of then-president Hussain Muhammad Ershad passed the District Council Act created three tiers of local government councils to devolve powers and responsibilities to the representatives of the native peoples, but the councils were rejected and opposed by the PCJSS.

Over 100 thousand tribals became refugees due to the construction of the Kaptai Dam, which also flooded 40 percent of agricultural land, and many were not compensated. Some of them fled to Arunachal Pradesh, India.

== Operation ==
Manabendra Narayan Larma, member of the East Pakistan Provincial Assembly in 1970, formed the Parbatya Chattagram Jana Samhati Samiti in March 1973 after Sheikh Mujibur Rahman did not listen to his plea to provide autonomy to the hill tracts in the constitution of Bangladesh. He also created an armed wing called Shanti Bahini. After the assassination of Sheikh Mujibur Rahman, Manabendra Narayan Larma fled to India. In 1977, the Shanti Bahini attacked a convoy of Bangladesh Army personnel which began the Chittagong Hill Tracts conflict.

In the 1980s, President Hussain Muhammad Ershad continued with Operation Dabanal. The region was placed under military rule in 1982.

G. M. Mushfiqur Rahman, a lieutenant in the Bangladesh Army posted in 1 Field Artillery Regiment of Bangladesh Army in Chittagong Hill Tracts. On 8 September 1989, he led a 17-member team of Bangladesh Army soldiers and attacked a Shanti Bahini militant camp. Lieutenant Rahman was injured during the clash and died on that day at 8:15 am. He was posthumously awarded with the Bir Uttom award.

The obverse of Dabanal padak

In response, Bangladesh Army started building up its defense facilities and the Chittagong Hill Tracts were placed under GOC of the 24th Infantry Division of the Bangladesh Army. General Ziaur Rahman, later president, launched Operation Dabanal as part of that militarization of the region. Bangladesh Army stated that the operation was to protect the civilians and to increase administrative efficiency in the Hill Tracts. In 1979, the Government of Bangladesh began a policy of settling ethnic Bengalis in the Chittagong Hill Tracts and changed the demographics of the region.

=== Peace Treaty ===
The Awami League government, under Prime Minister Sheikh Hasina came to power in 1996 with an election manifesto promising to end the conflict. It created the National Committee on Chittagong Hill Tracts Affairs which had 11 members. In 1997, the government of Bangladesh signed the Chittagong Hill Tracts Peace Accord with Parbatya Chattagram Jana Samhati Samiti bring an end to the Chittagong Hill Tracts Conflict and Operation Dabanal. The Shanti Bahini was abolished after the peace treaty was signed. Parbatya Chattagram Jana Samhati Samiti became a political party.

== Aftermath ==
The Army launched Operation Uttaran to replace Operation Dabanal on 1 September 2001. Under Operation Uttaran, Bangladesh Army received 10 thousand tons of rice which they used to develop settler villages in the Chittagong Hill Tracts. Under this operation, the military of Bangladesh continues to dominate the region, its civil administration, and resources.

Dabanal Padak is the service medal for participating in this campaign.
