= Chittagong Hill Tracts Welfare Association =

The Chittagong Hill Tracts Welfare Association (Bengali: Parbatya Chattagram Upajatiya Kalyan Samiti) was a clandestine political organisation created in East Pakistan in December 1966 to defend the rights of the tribal people of the Chittagong Hill Tracts (CHT).

The Pakistan government policy had dismantled piece by piece long standing protections of the CHT and the tribal people's way of life. Restrictions on Bengali migration into the CHT were lifted. Development projects encouraged logging and the establishment of rubber plantations. The Kaptai Dam, completed in 1962, submerged 40% of the arable land in the CHT and displaced 100,000 indigenous people.

The tribal population felt that these actions endangered their livelihood, culture, and ethnic identity. Buddhists had historically been the majority in the CHT. Their majority status was threatened by largescale migration of Bengali Muslim settlers to the CHT. Several indigenous associations, including, in 1966, the CHT Welfare Association, sprang up to defend the rights of the tribal people.

University of Dhaka academics Zahid Ul Arefin Choudhury and Khairul Chowdhury described the association as student-based, with a "pro-Chinese radical Marxist" ideology. It was led by Ananta Bihari Khisa and school teacher Jyotirindra Bodhipriya Larma. With the association's support, J. B. Larma's brother, Manabendra Narayan Larma, was elected to the East Pakistan Provincial Assembly in 1970 as an independent candidate.

The association dissolved in 1972 after the Bangladesh Liberation War. It was the precursor to the Parbatya Chattagram Jana Sanghati Samiti, which emerged as the main political party in the CHT and founded the Shanti Bahini to carry out an insurgency against Bangladeshi state forces to gain autonomy and rights for the tribes and people of the Hill Tracts.
