= Logang massacre =

Massacre of Jumma people

- Part of the Chittagong Hill Tracts conflict
- Location: Logang, Khagrachari District, Bangladesh
- Date: 10 April 1992
- Target: Jumma people
- Attack type: Massacre
- Perpetrators: Bangladesh security forces and plainsmen Bengali settlers
- Motive: Ethnic violence during the Chittagong Hill Tracts conflict

The Logang massacre (Bengali: লোগাং গণহত্যা) was the massacre of the Jumma people by the Bangladesh security forces and plainsmen Bengali settlers in Logang village of Khagrachari District on 10 April 1992.

== Massacre ==
The Logang Massacre took place in Logang village in the Khagrachari District along the border with India on April 10, 1992. The actual massacre involved Bengali civilians, border guards, and the army to become together to attack the Jumma people with axes, hatchets, and guns, burning down all the houses. It is estimated that over 400 people died, the highest loss of lives recorded through all of the above massacres. However, the government investigation committee announced that only 12 people have died. It is important to notice that there are no further investigations from the government available, because the army took away all the corpses. It is recorded that more than 2,000 people escaped to Tripura state in Northern east India. Through interviews of victims of the Logang Massacre, it is believed that more than 545 houses were burned and some citizens were not able to return to their villages until January 1997.

=== Official investigation ===
Soon after the Logang Massacre, the government of Bangladesh began an official investigation into the incident. This was carried out by Justice Sultan Hossain Khan (retired) and his Secretary, Mohammad Abdul Matin Sirker, a senior civil servant and the Additional District Magistrate of the Khagrachari District. Six months after the massacre, a report was submitted to the Home Ministry of Bangladesh on August 20, 1992, but it was never released to the Bangladeshi public. Instead, a 20-page English version of this report was published on the 8th of October 1992, followed by a later 25-page version containing Justice Khan's signature. This version was titled the "Logang Disturbances Enquiry Commission".

==== Report ====
The report claims that Shanti Bahini guerillas attacked five Bangladeshis with dao knives at Logang village, injuring all of them and killing Kabir Ahmed Hossein, who died from a throat wound. A punitive attack was launched by Bangladeshi security forces and Bengali settlers on the Logang village cluster, in which 13 Jummas were injured, 12 were killed and two went missing. Additionally, the report notes that 550 Jumma dwellings were burnt down.

==== Criticism of the report and the Chittagong Hill Tracts Commission ====
Amnesty International amongst others accused the report of containing contradictory and inconclusive information, and generally downplaying the role of the government forces in the massacre. Amnesty International also criticised the method and the conditions under which evidence was collected from Jumma witnesses and victims. One of the organisations that was heavily involved in an independent investigation of the Logang Massacre was The Chittagong Hill Tracts Commission. When members of this commission visited the site in 1990, it was found that individuals were giving reports that conflicted with those that they had given to the official government investigation.

The Government of Bangladesh assured Amnesty International that all those involved on behalf of the government had been prosecuted and brought to justice. But due to the lack of information on this, the Chittagong Hill Tracts Commission concluded that it is highly likely that those civil and military officials responsible were likely never tried, even if eight army officers lost their positions. Furthermore, it is of note that legal measures taken against Jumma people, who were even mere suspected to have been involved, were dealt with quite resolutely, further giving strength to the allegations of the Bangladeshi government bias in its dealings.

In the same 1990 report, the Chittagong Hill Tracts Commission were informed by Bangladeshi military officials about the strategy of how Shanti Bahini incites incidents to provoke the displacement of Jumma peoples by government forces and settlers, and thus strengthen their cause through recruitment of these displaced individuals. Justice Khan concluded in his report that Shanti Bahini had created the incident by attacking some Bengali boys, but could not back his claims up with conclusive evidence.

Despite the insistence of the government, that only 12 Jummas had been killed at the Logang village cluster, many eyewitnesses - including from those that had been ordered by paramilitaries to remove bodies from the site - report that many more had died, possibly in the hundreds. But exact numbers are unknown. Nevertheless, according to the independent investigations of the Chittagong Hill Tracts Commission, regardless of death toll in the Logang Massacre, it is certain that Bangladeshi security forces and settlers were involved in the killing of Jummas and the burning down of village buildings.

==== CHT Treaty ====
On the 2nd of December 1997, a peace accord was signed between Parbatya Chattagram Jana Samhati Samiti (PCJSS), who represent indigenous peoples of the CHT and whose armed wing is Shanti Bahini, and the government of Bangladesh. This agreement stipulated the legal recognition of indigenous peoples in the CHT as being ethnically distinct and worthy of representation, as reflected in the establishment of a Regional Council. This council however has an advisory role only and does not have any decision-making powers, and so does not reflect the desire of the PCJSS for full autonomy of the region. Regardless, this new government body enables members of native tribes to become elected officials, who have to be consulted by the central government in matters concerning the CHT.

This treaty has faced criticism from many sides: Right-Wing parties of Bangladesh, such as the BNP, state that Bangladesh is effectively giving up territory by signing this treaty, and pro-indigenous groups complain that demands such as full autonomy, demilitarisation and the withdrawal of Bangladeshi settlers from the CHT are not being addressed. Regardless of the inherent weaknesses of this peace accord, Internationally, it has been seen as a breakthrough in an ethnic struggle that now spans decades.

== See also ==
- Chittagong Hill Tracts conflict
