= Moshiur Rahman Jewel =

Lieutenant Colonel of the Bangladesh Army

Moshiur Rahman Jewel is a lieutenant colonel of the Bangladesh Army and former chief of intelligence of the Rapid Action Battalion, described by human rights activists as a "death squad". He is the former commander of Rapid Action Battalion-7, based in Chittagong.

== Career ==
In October 2021, Jewel was appointed director of the intelligence wing of Rapid Action Battalion, replacing Lieutenant Colonel Khairul Islam. Lieutenant Colonel M. A. Yusuf, replaced Jewel as commander of Rapid Action Battalion-7. Under Jewel, Rapid Action Battalion released a video showing Bangladeshi students and youths who disappeared and joined Jama'atul Ansar Fil Hindal Sharqiya being trained by Kuki-Chin National Front in February 2023. He commented to the media, "By analysing the video, one clearly understands that those militants are highly capable in terms of firearms and physical training. It would have been a catastrophe if they managed to come to the plain lands and carried out attacks.".

Jewel confirmed the arrest of Mufti Harun Izhar of Hifazat-e Islam Bangladesh over protests against Prime Minister Narendra Modi's visit to Bangladesh in April 2021.

On 20 June 2023, Jewel was replaced by Lieutenant Colonel Saiful Islam Sumon as director of the intelligence wing of Rapid Action Battalion.

Jewel was removed from a planned deployment to the United Nations peacekeeping operations at the last moment, along with another former officer of the Rapid Action Battalion, in June 2024. This happened after Deutsche Welle ran a report questioning if army officers who served in the Rapid Action Battalion, who it described as a "death squad", should be allowed to serve in peacekeeping missions. In November 2020, a young man died under suspicious circumstances from blunt force trauma in the custody of Rapid Action Battalion-7, commanded by Jewel.
