= Chittagong Hill Tracts Regional Council =

Autonomous administrative division in Bangladesh

- Formation: 27 May 1999
- Headquarters: Rangamati, Bangladesh
- Region served: Bangladesh
- Official language: Bengali
- Chairman: Santu Larma

Chittagong Hill Tracts Regional Council is the local government body responsible for the welfare and administration of districts in Chittagong Hill Tracts, which include Bandarban District, Khagrachari District, and Rangamati Hill District, in Bangladesh. Jyotirindra Bodhipriya Larma, also known as Santu Larma, is the chairman of the Chittagong Hill Tracts Regional Council. He is also the chairman of Parbatya Chattagram Jana Samhati Samiti.

== History ==
The Government of Bangladesh was engaged in a low intensity conflict with the Parbatya Chattagram Jana Samhati Samiti (PCJSS) , who represented non-Bengali tribal communities in the Hill Tracts. On 2 December 1997, the Government of Bangladesh and the PCJSS signed a peace treaty, bringing an end to the Chittagong Hill Tracts conflict. The Chittagong Hill Tracts Regional Council was established on 27 May 1999, according to the Chittagong Hill Tracts Regional Council Act 1998. In 2010, Bangladesh High Court declared the Chittagong Hill Tracts Regional Council illegal and unconstitutional. The court ruling was passed in two cases filed by a Bengali settler, M. Badiuzzaman in 2000, and a lawyer, Tajul Islam in 2007. On 3 March 2011, the Appellate Division upheld the verdict of the High Court. The government of Bangladesh and Jyotirindra Bodhipriya Larma, President of Chittagong Hill Tracts Regional Council, filed an appeal against the verdict. On 9 January 2018, Bangladesh Supreme Court stayed the verdict of the High Court.
