= Sharqiya =

Sharqiya means 'eastern' in Arabic. It may refer to:

== Places ==
- Al-Lubban ash-Sharqiya, Palestinian village in the northern West Bank
- Al-Mazra'a ash-Sharqiya, Palestinian town in the Ramallah and al-Bireh Governorate
- An-Nazla ash-Sharqiya, Palestinian village in Tulkarm Governorate in the eastern West Bank
- As-Sawahira ash-Sharqiya, Palestinian town in the Jerusalem Governorate
- Bani Zeid al-Sharqiya, Palestinian town in the northern West Bank
- Jabala Sharqiya, Syrian village located in Hish Nahiyah in Maarrat al-Nu'man District, Idlib
- Sharqiya Sands, a region of desert located in Oman

== Other uses ==
- Ahrar al-Sharqiya, armed Syrian rebel group
- Al Sharqiya, Iraq's first privately owned satellite channel
- Al-Sharqiya SC, Iraqi football team
- Jama'atul Ansar Fil Hindal Sharqiya, banned Islamist terrorist organization in Bangladesh

== See also ==
- Sharqia Governorate, Egypt
- Ash Sharqiyah (disambiguation) (ash-Sharqiyah, esh-Sharqiyah, al-Sharqiyah, el-Sharqiyah): the eastern/Oriental
