= Nathan Bom =

Founder of Kuki-Chin National Front (KNF)

- Born: 1980 (age 45–46); Ruma Upazila, Bandarban District, Bangladesh
- Allegiance: Kuki-Chin National Front
- Branch: Kuki-Chin National Army
- Service years: 2022–present
- Conflicts: Chittagong Hill Tracts conflict
- Spouse: Lelsom Kim Bom (m. 2009)
- Children: At least one

Nathan Lancheo Bom is a Bawm politician and militant leader from the Chittagong Hill Tracts who is the founding president of the Kuki-Chin National Front (KNF), as well as the leader of the Kuki-Chin National Army (KNA). He founded KNF in 2017. Since then, his location remains unknown.

== Biography ==
Bom was born in 1980 at Edenpara, Ruma upazila. His father, Jaotan Loncheo Bom, was a Jhum farmer and mother, Raukil Bom, was a homemaker. He is the youngest among the six siblings, five brothers and one sister.

Bom went to Dhaka after this Secondary School Certificate (SSC) examination. He passed his Higher Secondary Certificate (HSC) examination from Dhaka College. In 1996, he earned his master's degree from Dhaka University Faculty of Fine Arts, making him the first from the Bawm community to attain such.

He was associated with politics from a young age. He was a member of Parbatya Chattagram Jana Samhati Samiti (PCJSS)'s youth wing. In 2000, Bom set up a sculpture of Manabendra Narayan Larma at Khagrachhari town. He is a former member of Hill Artists Group.

In the 2018 Bangladesh general elections, Bom become the first politician from the Bawm community to collect nomination paper for 300th Jatiya Sangsad constituency. However, his nomination paper was rejected.

He wrote five research treatises and a book about Bawm community, named The Bawmjow.

Bom is married. His wife Lelsom Kim Bom is a staff nurse working at local government health complex, although other sources say that she is a school teacher. The couple has at least one child, with some sources reporting two, with the elder son studying at Aizawl of Mizoram, India.

== Views ==
Bom bears a strong anti-Chakma sentiment. He believes that Chakmas exercise a domination or hierarchy over the other tribes of Chittagong Hill Tracts. He considers Kuki-Chins (Zo people) to be the Bhumiputro (Son of the soil) of the tribal region of Chittagong Hill Tracts. He proposed a state for the Kuki-Chins in the Chittagong Hill Tracts either autonomous or independent where there will be no place for Chakmas, along with Marmas & Tripuris. He is also a critic of Parbatya Chattagram Jana Sanghati Samiti for not representing the tribes of Chittagong Hill Tracts equally, which may came to be influenced by his Chakma hatred.

Political experts find his anti-Chakma roots in 2003 when he applied for a job at a local project of United Nations Development Program (UNDP), but he got rejected and some Chakma youths got that job. Bom believed that he wasn't given the job for being an ethnic minority and Chakma people's outnumbering his community, which made him to be hostile towards the Chakmas.

== Kuki-Chin National Front ==
In 2008, Bom founded an NGO named Kuki-Chin National Development Organization (KNDO), which "carried out philanthropic activities including greening of vast forest areas in the hills, conservation of animals and birds and natural beauty."

In 2016, he launched an armed group named Kuki-Chin National Volunteers (KNV). In 2017, KNV changed its name to Kuki-Chin National Front (KNF).
