= Charu Bikash Chakma =

Bangladeshi politician

Charu Bikash Chakma is a Bangladeshi Chakma politician who was one of the senior leaders of the political movement of the Chittagong Hill Tracts and co-founder of the Parbatya Chattagram Jana Samhati Samiti. He was an Awami League candidate in the 1970 Pakistani general election but lost to Manabendra Narayan Larma, his close friend. He met the government of independent Bangladesh in December 1971 in a failed bid to secure constitutional safeguards for indigenous people of Bangladesh. He was a leader of the Chakma Jubak Samity.
