= Chittagong Hill Tracts Peace Accord =

1997 agreement in Bangladesh

Chittagong Hill Tracts Treaty 1997 পার্বত্য চট্টগ্রাম শান্তি চুক্তি
- Type: Peace treaty
- Signed: 2 December 1997
- Location: Prime Minister's Office, Dhaka
- Mediators: The National Committee on Chittagong Hill Tracts Affairs
- Negotiators: Government of Bangladesh; Parbatya Chattagram Jana Sanghati Samiti
- Original signatories: Abul Hasnat Abdullah; Jyotirindra Bodhipriya Larma
- Citations: Chittagong Hill Tracts Treaty 1997
- Language: Bengali
- Languages: English, Bengali

The Chittagong Hill Tracts Peace Accord (Bengali: পার্বত্য চট্টগ্রাম শান্তি চুক্তি) was a peace agreement signed between the Government of Bangladesh and the Parbatya Chattagram Jana Samhati Samiti (United People's Party of the Chittagong Hill Tracts), the political organisation that controlled the Shanti Bahini militia on 2 December 1997. The accord formalized the recognition of the rights of the peoples and tribes of the Chittagong Hill Tracts region and ended the decades-long Shanti Bahini insurgency against government forces.

== Background ==
The modern conflict in the Chittagong Hill Tracts began when the political representatives of the native peoples protested against the government policy of recognising only the Bengali culture and language and designating all citizens of Bangladesh as Bengalis. In talks with Hill Tracts delegation led by Chakma politician Manabendra Narayan Larma, the country's founding leader Sheikh Mujibur Rahman insisted that the ethnic groups of the Hill Tracts adopt the Bengali identity. Sheikh Mujib is also reported to have threatened to settle Bengalis in the Hill Tracts to turn the native peoples into a minority.

== Conflict ==
Consequently, Manabendra Narayan Larma and others founded the Parbatya Chattagram Jana Samhati Samiti (PCJSS) as a united political organisation of all native peoples and tribes in 1973. The armed wing of the PCJSS, the Shanti Bahini, was organised to resist government policies. The Shanti Bahini insurgents hid in the neighbouring Indian state of Tripura, where they trained and equipped themselves. In 1977, they launched their first attack on a Bangladesh Army convoy. The Shanti Bahini divided its area of operations into zones, and raised forces from the native people, who were formally trained. The Shanti Bahini attacked Bengali police and soldiers, government offices and personnel, and the Bengali settlers in the region. The group also attacked any native believed to be opposing it and supporting the government. During the insurgency, the Shanti Bahini, the Bangladeshi Army, police and gangs of Bengali settlers were accused of perpetrating abuse of human rights and ethnic cleansing.

== Attempted solutions ==
President of Bangladesh Ziaur Rahman created a Chittagong Hill Tracts Development Board under an army general to address the socioeconomic needs of the region, but the entity proved unpopular and became a source of antagonism and mistrust amongst the native people against the government. The government failed to address the long-standing issue of the displacement of people, numbering an estimated 100,000 caused by the construction of the Kaptai Dam in 1962. In the mid 1980s, the government began settling Bengalis in the region, causing the eviction of many natives and a significant alteration of demographics. Having constituted only 11.6% of the regional population in 1974, the number of Bengalis grew by 1991 to constitute 48.5% of the regional population. In 1989, the government of then-president Hossain Mohammad Ershad passed the District Council Act created three ties of local government councils to devolve powers and responsibilities to the representatives of the native peoples, but the councils were rejected and opposed by the PCJSS.

== Peace accord ==
Peace negotiations were initiated after the restoration of democracy in Bangladesh in 1991. Fresh rounds of talks began in 1996 with the newly elected prime minister Sheikh Hasina of the Awami League, the daughter of Sheikh Mujib. The peace accord was finalized and formally signed on 2 December 1997.

The agreement recognized the distinct ethnicity and special status of the tribes and indigenous peoples of the Chittagong Hill Tracts, and established a Regional Council consisting of the local government councils of the three districts of the Hill Tracts. The council was to be composed by men and women from the Chakma, Marma, Tripura, Murang and Tanchangya tribes; the delegates would be elected by the district councils of the Hill Tracts. Elected for a five-year term, the council would have authority and responsibility to maintain law and order, social justice and tribal laws, oversee general administration, co-ordinate disaster relief and management, issue licenses for heavy industries and oversee other development projects. The central government would be required to consult the regional councils over all issues concerning the Hill Tracts.

The agreement also provided for the setting up of a central Ministry of Tribal Affairs to be headed by a person of tribal ethnicity to administer the affairs concerning the Hill Tracts. The agreement also laid out plans for the return of land to displaced natives and an elaborate land survey to be held in the Hill Tracts.

== Assessment ==
After the treaty was signed, the PCJSS emerged as a mainstream political party. The Shanti Bahini insurgents formally laid down their arms and received monetary compensation. More than 50,000 displaced tribals were able to return to their homes. The treaty received a mixed response in Bangladesh. While praised by many who sought an end to violence and to forge peace and development, the accord was seen by others as compromising the territorial integrity of Bangladesh and the assertion that the Chittagong Hill Tracts were an inalienable part of the country. The treaty was also criticised due to the secrecy surrounding the negotiations and allegations by the then-opposition party, the BNP, which claimed that the demands of the Bengali settlers were not accommodated in the agreement and that far too many concessions had been made. However, the BNP promised to implement the accord after its election victory in 2001.

== See also ==
- Chittagong Hill Tracts Conflict
- Chittagong Hill Tracts manual
- Parbatya Chattagram Jana Sanghati Samiti
