= Saiful Islam Sumon =

Saiful Islam Sumon is a Lieutenant Colonel of the Bangladesh Army and former director of the intelligence wing of the Rapid Action Battalion, an elite paramilitary force. He was charged with crimes against humanity along with former Bangladesh Army and Rapid Action Battalion officers for their involvement in enforced disappearance during rule of Prime Minister Sheikh Hasina.

== Career ==
In April 2023, Sumon led a raid by the Rapid Action Battalion, detaining three Arakan Rohingya Salvation Army-affiliated arms traffickers in Cox's Bazar District. He was serving as the commander of Rapid Action Battalion-15.

On 20 June 2023, Sumon replaced by Lieutenant Colonel Moshiur Rahman Jewel as director of the intelligence wing of Rapid Action Battalion.

After the fall of the Sheikh Hasina led Awami League government, Sumon was detained with 14 other Bangladesh Army officers. They were accused of crimes against humanity at the International Crimes Tribunal-1 over enforced disappearance during the rule by Sheikh Hasina. He was sent to jail in October 2025. He was detained at a temporary prison established in Dhaka Cantonment for the trail.
