= Chittagong Hill Tracts manual =

Chittagong Hill Tracts Regulation, 1900 (Act 1 of 1900) popularly known as Chittagong Hill Tracts manual is a manual enacted by the then British India Government describing how to administer the Chittagong Hill Tracts of present-day eastern Bangladesh. It was adopted in place of earlier manuals, after the government realised that the act of 1860 would not work satisfactorily. Since the adoption of the manual, the administration of Chittagong Hill Tracts was carried on in accordance with the rules of the manual.

A law titled "Hill Districts (Repeal and Enforcement of Law and Special Provision) Act, 1989" has been enacted to repeal the Regulation.

The Chittagong Hill Tracts Regulation received the assent of the Governor General on 6 January 1900 and was published in Calcutta Gazette on 17 January 1900. The new regulation became effective from May 1900 and the old designation of superintendent was restored and the earlier rules were annulled. In 1920, the superintendent title was designated as deputy commissioner and the responsibility was put in charge of the governor and his executive council after amending the regulation.

Earlier in 1881, Chittagong Hill Tracts Frontier Police Regulation was adopted for effective administration of police force in the Chittagong Hill Tracts. This force was composed almost exclusively of the tribes people. This Frontier Police Regulation also became a part of the Chittagong Hill Tracts manual.

== Main features ==
The main features of Chittagong Hill Tracts manual were as following

- Chittagong Hill Tracts was made out of bounds for a non-hill man unless he was in possession of a permit issued by the deputy commissioner at his discretion.
- The deputy commissioner was given the right to expel any one who was not a native of the district (non-tribal) if he was found to be harmful/injurious to the peaceful administration of the district.
- Legal practitioners were barred from appearing in any court in Chittagong Hill Tracts
- No one shall in future be permitted to hold more than 25 acres (10 ha) of land in all whether under one lease or more than one lease and lease may be granted only to hill men provided that non-hill men of the cultivating classes actually residents in a village maybe given lease in that village
- The Chittagong Hill Tracts was made a district for the purpose of criminal and civil jurisdiction for revenue and general purposes and the Deputy Commissioner was made the district magistrate and the general administration of the said tract in criminal civil, revenue and all other matters shall be vested in him.
- The Chittagong Hill Tracts was made a session division and the commissioner was made the session judge.
- The local government shall exercise the power of a high court for the purpose of submission of sentences of death for confirmation under the code of criminal procedure 1898.
- All officers in the Chittagong Hill Tracts were made subordinate to the deputy commissioner who was authorised to revise any order made by any such officer and the commissioner was authorised to revise any order made by the deputy commissioner.
- The local government may make rules for carrying into effect the objects and purpose of this regulation.
- Registration Act 1908 does not applicable to Chittagong Hill Tracts. Rules no. 12-33 of the Regulation deal with registration of documents there.
- The three chiefs of three circles were charged with administration of their respective circles. Every person residing or cultivating within a circle was subject to the jurisdiction of its Chief with exemption of government officers, their families, traders and shopkeepers in Bazaars.The headmen were in charge of the administration of Mouza (smallest revenue unit of a district) and they were appointed by the D.C in consultation of sub-divisional officer, the chief and inhabitants of Mouza. without a Headman's recommendation no settlement or transfer cases of land could be processed.

But now-a-days this provision and other provisions of Chittagong Hill Tracts manual protecting the interests of the tribes are more disregarded than followed.

- The district of Chittagong Hill Tracts was divided into two sub-divisions, Rangamati and Ramgarh. And each one of them was put in charge of a sub-divisional officer.

However, Bandarban became a sub-division in 1952 and in 1981 it became a district. In January 1970, the headquarters of Ramgarh sub-division was shifted to Khagrachari from Ramgarh;later in 1983 it became a district. Thus Chittagong Hill Tracts became three districts.

- The D.C had to consult the Chiefs on important matters affecting the administration of the district. For this purpose a conference was to be held at least twice a year under the presidency of the D.C to which the Chiefs or their representatives were to be invited.

== Result of the enforcement of the manual ==
As a result of the enforcement of the manual, the old Taluks (a certain administrative area), which were created by Rani Kalindi were abolished and the Circles were divided into Mouzas and a Headman was put in charge of a Mouza. A Karbari (village headman) was put in charge of one village, while several villages composed one Mouza. Each Headman collects Jhum rent and pays it to the Chief, while the chief pays the plough rent to the Sub-Divisional Officer or the D.C after collection. The investiture of the Chiefs was regulated by the Bengal Government.

== See also ==
- Chittagong Hill Tracts Conflict
- Chittagong Hill Tracts Peace Accord
- Parbatya Chattagram Jana Sanghati Samiti
