= Birendra Kishore Roaza =

Politician

- বীরেন্দ্র কিশোর রোয়াজা

Member of the Legislative Assembly of the East Pakistan Legislative Assembly
- Incumbent
- Assumed office 12 March 1954
- Constituency: Chittagong Hill Tracts

President of PCJSS
- In office 1972–1974
- Preceded by: Manabendra Narayan Larma

Personal details
- Born: 1913 Thakurchara Tipra Village, Khagrachari District, British India
- Died: 1985 Bangladesh
- Education: Rangamati Government High School; Chittagong College; University of Calcutta
- Occupation: Teacher; social activist; politician
- Known for: Founder of PCJSS; Founder of Bangladesh Tripura Kalyan Sangsad

Birendra Kishore Roaza was a Tripuri social activist and politician who represented the Chittagong Hill Tracts in the 1954 East Bengal Legislative Assembly election. He was the first Jumma member of the East Bengal Legislative Assembly.

In 1972, the first conference of the Parbatya Chattagram Jana Samhati Samiti elected him as president.
