= Jama'atul Ansar Fil Hindal Sharqiya =

Jama'atul Ansar Fil Hindal Sharqiya is a banned Islamist terrorist organization in Bangladesh. It has received support from the Kuki-Chin National Front.

== History ==
Jama'atul Ansar Fil Hindal Sharqiya was founded in 2017 by Shamin Mahfuz. It became active in 2019 and included former members of the Ansar Al Islam, Harkat-ul-Jihad-al-Islami Bangladesh, and Jamaat-ul-Mujahideen Bangladesh.

Jama'atul Ansar Fil Hindal Sharqiya established ties with Kuki-Chin National Front, an ethnic separatist group in the Chittagong Hill Tracts, and its leader Nathan Bom to receive training. One of the detained suspects was Rafat Sadik Saifullah, son of Shafiqur Rahman, Ameer of Bangladesh Jamaat-e-Islami but the police did not find any evidence of organizational ties between Bangladesh Jamaat-e-Islami and Jama'atul Ansar Fil Hindal Sharqiya.

In October 2022, Counter Terrorism and Transnational Crime Unit detained five members of Jama'atul Ansar Fil Hindal Sharqiya from Demra. Rapid Action Battalion detained four members of Jama'atul Ansar Fil Hindal Sharqiya in November.

Md Asaduzzaman of the Counter Terrorism and Transnational Crime arrested Mohibullah also known as Bhola's Shaikh from Sayedabad. Rapid Action Battalion detained four members from Chittagong after detaining four from Cox's Bazar following a gunfight.Dhaka Metropolitan Police's Counter Terrorism and Transnational Crime Unit detained its founder Shamin Mahfuz on 23 June 2023 from Demra, Dhaka and its Amer from Anisur Rahman alias Mahmud from Munshiganj District on 25 July. Shamin received funding from sacked Bangladesh Army Major Syed Mohammad Ziaul Haque.

According to Rapid Action Battalion, Jama'atul Ansar Fil Hindal Sharqiya is the most dangerous terrorist outfit in Bangladesh. The group had trained 55 members in the Chittagong Hill Tracts under Kuki-Chin National Front. It received funding from local and foreign donors and owned a number of businesses. Lieutenant Colonel Moshiur Rahman Jewel of Rapid Action Battalion described the group as well trained in firearms usage after reviewing training videos of the militant group. Jama'atul Ansar Fil Hindal Sharqiya also guarded the bases of Kuki-Chin National Front in the Chittagong Hill Tracts and lost one member in a gunfight while defending the base. The group had plans to establish a naval unit.

Bangladesh banned the Jama'atul Ansar Fil Hindal Sharqiya on 10 August 2023; which was announced in a video message by Commander Khandaker Al Moin, Law and Media Wing Director of Rapid Action Battalion.

In May 2024, Detective Branch, led by Harun-or-Rashid, arrested three members of Jama'atul Ansar Fil Hindal Sharqiya including its chief recruiter. According to Harun 49 members of the group had been detained in total.

In February 2025, the deputy chief of the group Mohibullah was released from prison.
