= Naba Bikram Kishore Tripura =

Bangladeshi politician

- নব বিক্রম কিশোর ত্রিপুরা

Chairman Chittagong Hill Tracts Development Board
- In office December 2013 – April 2021
- Preceded by: Ushwe Sing

Ministry of Chittagong Hill Tracts Affairs

Secretary
- In office 16 June 2011 – 18 February 2018

Ministry of Foreign Affairs

Ambassador
- In office 10 October 2010 – 2011

Bangladesh Police

Additional Inspector General
- In office 2007 – 6 October 2010

"Intelligence Department"

Editor-in-Chief
- In office 2007–2010

Personal details
- Born: 1 March 1956 (age 70) Rangamati, East Pakistan
- Education: Swedish Defence University; National Defence College (Bangladesh); University of Dhaka; Dhaka College
- Awards: Commanders Award for Public Service by United States Department of Defense
- Religion: Hinduism

Naba Bikram Kishore Tripura is a government official. He was the chairman of the Chittagong Hill Tracts Development Board. He served as secretary of Ministry of Chittagong Hill Tracts Affairs from 2011 to 2018. He served as an ambassador at the Ministry of Foreign Affairs from 2010 to 2011. Before that, he held the position of additional inspector general of the Bangladesh Police, which is the second in command within the organization.

== Education ==
Naba Bikram Kishore Tripura was born at Rangamati Hill District. and he completed his primary and high school education in Rangamati. After that, he went to Dhaka College and participated in the Bangladesh Liberation War. He completed undergraduate and graduate studies in English language at the University of Dhaka.

== Career ==
In 1982, Tripura joined as assistant superintendent of police (ASP) of Bangladesh Police after completing the Bangladesh Public Civil Service Exam.

While serving as Bangladesh's first mission deputy contingent commander in the US-led "Operation Uphold Democracy in Haiti" in the Western Hemisphere in 1994, he was awarded by the US Department of Defense's "Commanders Award for Public Service" for outstanding performance. (UNMHA) and won the United Nations Medal.

During the Bangladesh Nationalist Party rule from 2001 to 2006, Tripura was denied promotion along with other religious minorities and people from Gopalganj District who were viewed as being loyal to the opposition Awami League. He was the deputy commissioner of Chittagong Metropolitan Police in 2001. He was posted to the Criminal Investigation Department in 2002 as special superintendent. He was afterwards transferred to Khulna Range. He was then posted at the Bangladesh Police Academy and Detective Training School. He was sent to study at the National Defence College in 2005. In 2007, he was appointed Additional Inspector General of Bangladesh Police.

Tripura has held important positions of commanding, staff and instruction. He was twice elected president of the Bangladesh Police Service Association. He was the managing director of the Bangladesh Police Co-operative Society and editor-in-chief of the "Intelligence Department" from 2007 to 2010. He was appointed in March 2007 as the national project director of the Police Reform Program and held the post until 6 October 2010, when he joined the Ministry of Foreign Affairs. He was appointed the acting secretary of the Ministry of Chittagong Hill Tracts Affairs on 16 June 2011. In 2012, he was made a full secretary of the government of Bangladesh.

Tripura was elected chairman of the International Centre for Integrated Mountain Development (ICIMDD) board of governors in 2016. The International Centre for Integrated Mountain Development, an intergovernmental regional organization, was established in 1983 with eight regional members - Afghanistan, Pakistan, India, Nepal, Bhutan, China, Myanmar and Bangladesh.

Tripura was the secretary of the Ministry of Chittagong Hill Tracts Affairs from 16 June 2011 to 28 February 2018. From December 2013 to February 2018, he was the chairman of the Chittagong Hill Tracts Development Board (CHTDB). He was reappointed chairman of the board in March 2018.
