= Upendra Lal Chakma =

Bangladeshi politician

Upendra Lal Chakma উপেন্দ্র লাল চাকমা 𑄅𑄛𑄬𑄚𑄴𑄘𑄳𑄢𑄧 𑄣𑄣𑄴 𑄌𑄇𑄴𑄟

Member of Parliament for Chittagong Hill Tracts-1
- In office 2 April 1979 – 24 March 1982
- Preceded by: Manabendra Narayan Larma
- Succeeded by: Constituency Dissolved

Personal details
- Born: c. 1925
- Died: 18 July 2005 (aged 80)
- Party: Jatiya Samajtantrik Dal-JSD

Upendra Lal Chakma (Bengali: উপেন্দ্র লাল চাকমা) (c. 1925 – 18 July 2005) was a Bangladeshi politician from Khagrachhari belonging to Jatiya Samajtantrik Dal-JSD. He was a member of the Jatiya Sangsad. He was an adviser to the President of Bangladesh too.

== Biography ==
Chakma was elected as a member of the Jatiya Sangsad from Chittagong Hill Tracts-1 in 1979 as a Jatiya Samajtantrik Dal-JSD candidate. He also served as an adviser to the President of Bangladesh.

Chakma died of cardiac arrest at Khagrachhari Sadar Hospital on 18 July 2005 at the age of 80.
