= Muhammad Khairul Islam =

Bangladeshi army officer

Mohammad Khairul Islam
- মোহাম্মদ খায়রুল ইসলাম
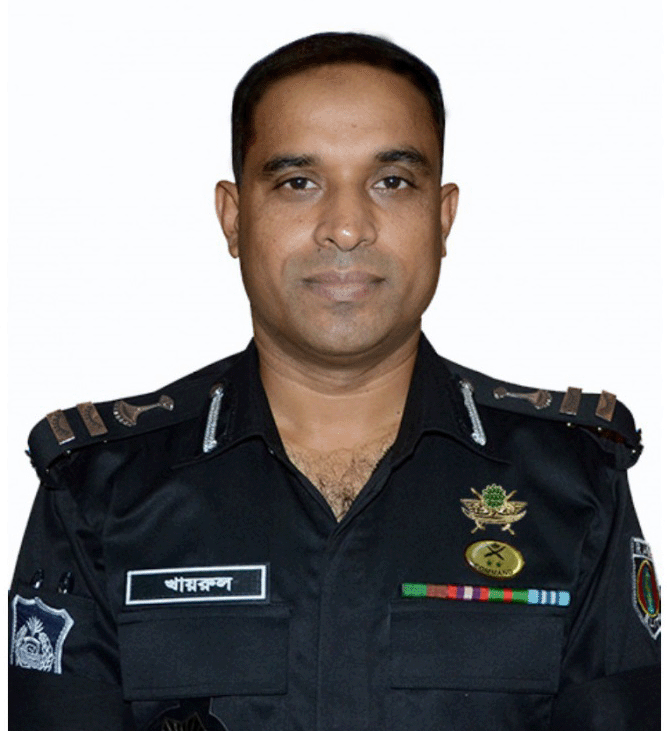
- Military career
- Branch: Bangladesh Army
- Service years: c. 2000s–2022
- Rank: Lieutenant Colonel
- Unit: Military Intelligence
- Commands: Rapid Action Battalion-12
- Known for: Director of the Intelligence Wing of the Rapid Action Battalion

Lieutenant Colonel Mohammad Khairul Islam is an officer of the Bangladesh Army and former director of the Intelligence Wing of the Rapid Action Battalion. He is the former commanding officer of Rapid Action Battalion-12.

== Career ==
Islam is a commissioned officer in the Bangladesh Army and has held several key posts across different military units and agencies. He is a graduate of the Defence Services Command and Staff College in Mirpur.

In 2009, Islam served under the United Nations Mission in Sudan as part of the Bangladeshi contingent BANMP-4. On 19 September 2019, he joined the Rapid Action Battalion on deputation and was appointed commander of RAB-12 on 14 November 2019. During his tenure at RAB-12, Khairul Islam oversaw operations aimed at combating militancy, drug trafficking, robbery, and other criminal activities.

In November 2020, Islam was appointed as director of the Intelligence Wing of the Rapid Action Battalion, replacing Lieutenant Colonel Md Sarwar Bin Kashem.

He also served for DGFI in his military career.

In March 2025, the Commission for Inquiry on Enforced Disappearance requested the Ministry of Home Affairs to suspend Islam's passport. In October 2025, Islam was charged of being involved with enforcement disappearance at the International Crimes Tribunal during the rule of the Sheikh Hasina-led Awami League government. He was shown as absconding. 15 officers of the Bangladesh Army were detained in the case.
