= Calcutta Gazette =

English newspaper in Bengal, India

- Owner: Francis Gladwin
- Founded: 1784
- Language: English language
- Headquarters: Calcutta, British India

Calcutta Gazette was an English newspaper in Bengal founded by Francis Gladwin, a colonial officer, in 1784. It was one of the first newspapers in India.

== History ==
The Calcutta Gazette was founded by Francis Gladwin, an officer in the British East India Company, and an orientalist. Its first issue was published on 4 March 1784. The newspaper became an important medium for the publication of public information. The Gazette initially charged the government for advertisements but stopped after the government provided the Gazette with free postal circulation and free postage. The government withdrew this in 1787. In January 1787, Francis Gladwin gave control of the company to Arthur Muir, Herbert H. Harrington and Edmond Morris. The three were civilians involved with the newspaper. In June 1815 the Government Gazette was created by the Bengal Military Orphan Society. All government advertisements were diverted to the Government Gazette from the Calcutta Gazette. Private advertisers also left the newspaper and advertising revenue declined. Employees at the newspaper went on strike. In June 1818 the Calcutta Gazette was sold to the owner of the Calcutta Morning Post, Heatly. On 29 September 1818 Heatly stopped publication of the Calcutta Gazette in favor of a new newspaper founded by James Silk Buckingham called the Calcutta Journal.

In April 1832, the Government Gazette reassumed the name the Calcutta Gazette.
