= Jabala Sharqiya =

Jabala Sharqiya جبالا الشرقية
- Village
- Location in Syria
- Coordinates: 35°30′28″N 36°38′51″E
- Country: Syria
- Governorate: Idlib
- District: Maarrat al-Nu'man District
- Subdistrict: Hish Nahiyah

Population (2004)
  - Total: 332
- Time zone: UTC+2 (EET)
  - Summer (DST): UTC+3 (EEST)
- City Qrya Pcode: N/A

Jabala Sharqiya (Arabic: جبالا الشرقية) is a Syrian village located in Hish Nahiyah in Maarrat al-Nu'man District, Idlib. According to the Syria Central Bureau of Statistics (CBS), Jabala Sharqiya had a population of 332 in the 2004 census.
