= Kuki-Chin National Front =

Armed ethnic organisation in Bangladesh

- Abbreviation: KNF
- Leader: Nathan Bom
- Chief Coordinator: Cheosim Bom (POW)
- Founder: Nathan Bom
- Founded: 2008 (18 years ago) (as Kuki-Chin National Development Organization); 2017 (9 years ago) (current form)
- Headquarters: Chin state, Myanmar
- Armed wing: Kuki-Chin National Army
- Ideology: Autonomy demands Kuki-Chin interests
- Slogan: "Nehnak Chu Lalpa Ta"

Party flag

Website
- Kuki-Chin National Front - KNF Facebook
- Politics of Bangladesh; Political parties; Elections; a: KNF has no official website, but it maintains an official facebook page where it updates about its activities.

The Kuki-Chin National Front (KNF), also known as the Bom Party, is a banned armed militant political organization in Bangladesh based in the Chittagong Hill Tracts. Established by Nathan Bom in 2008, KNF aims to establish a separate autonomous or independent state for Bawm, Pangkhua, Lushai, Khumi, Mru & Khiang peoples with nine subdistricts (upazilas) of Rangamati and Bandarban districts. The Front has an armed wing called Kuki-Chin National Army. According to Bangladeshi law enforcement agencies, Kuki-Chin National Front has received weapons from Kachin State in Myanmar, and also has ties with Karen rebels.

== History ==
The red-colured areas in this map of the Chittagong Hill Tracts indicate to the proposed Kuki-Chin State. Most of the territories demanded by KNF fall under Rangamati and Bandarban districts

Kuki-Chin National Front was established in 2017 by members of the Bawm people in Bangladesh with two thousand personnel. The Bawm community is mostly Christian and accuses the Parbatya Chattagram Jana Samhati Samiti of discrimination. The founding president of the Kuki-Chin National Front is Nathan Bom, a graduate of fine arts from the University of Dhaka. He was previously involved with the Parbatya Chattagram Jana Samhati Samiti's student wing, the Pahari Chhatra Parishad, and founded the Kuki-Chin National Development Organization in 2008 and renamed to Kuki-Chin National Volunteers (KNV) in 2016. KNV developed relations with the rebels of the Manipur state of India and Chin state of Myanmar. In the first batch of KNV fighters, over a hundred members of the organization were sent to Manipur for training, followed by 100 members to be sent to India's Manipur and Myanmar's Karen and Kachin states. The Kuki-Chin National Volunteers would become the Kuki-Chin National Front (KNF) in 2020.

In June 2022, the Kuki-Chin National Front attacked a camp of Parbatya Chattagram Jana Samhati Samiti, killing three in Belaichhari Upazila, Rangamati District. In October, tourists were sent back from Bandarban District in preparation for an operation by Bangladesh Army and other security forces against Kuki-Chin National Front, escalating to the second phase of the Chittagong Hill Tracts conflict. In November 2022, Bangladesh Army launched a drive against Kuki-Chin National Front which saw 270 Kuki people seek refuge in Mizoram State in India.

In February 2023, Rapid Action Battalion arrested 17 personnel of Jama'atul Ansar Fil Hindal Sharqiya and three members of Kuki-Chin National Front after a day-long gunfight. They also recovered AK-22 rifles among other weapons and bomb making equipment. Jama'atul Ansar Fil Hindal Sharqiya paid 1.7 million to Kuki-Chin National Front for weapons. By January 2023, 14 members of Kuki-Chin National Front were detained.

On mid-2025, Bangladeshi military officials stated there are links between the Kuki-Chin National Front (KNF) and the Arakan Army, noting shared ethnic backgrounds.

== Kuki-Chin National Army ==
Kuki-Chin National Army
- Leader: Nathan Bom
- Chief of Staff: Vanchun Lian Master
- Dates active: 2022 – present
- Country: Bangladesh
- Allegiance: Kuki-Chin National Front
- Active regions: Chittagong Hill Tracts
- Status: Active
- Size: 100 (2016); 2,000 (2024)

Kuki-Chin National Army (KNA) is the armed wing of Kuki-Chin National Front. Vanchun Lian Master, a vice-principal of the government primary school, is the chief of staff of the Kuki-Chin National Front's armed wing.

From 11 to 17 January 2023, the Bandarban District administration banned tourists in the district due to a security forces' operation against the Kuki-Chin National Army. A bullet hit body of Kuki-Chin National Army personnel was found Ruma Upazila on 30 January 2023 after a gunfight with security forces. Another gunfight took place between Rapid Action Battalion and the Kuki-Chin National Army. On 12 March, the Assam Rifles detained two members of the Kuki-Chin National Army in Mirozam. In April 2023, eight people were killed in a shoot-out between the United People's Democratic Front (Democratic), a fraction of the United People's Democratic Front, and Kuki-Chin National Army in Rowangchhari Upazila, Bandarban District. However during a confrontation between Bangladesh Army and KNF in 2026 it was claimed that a strategic alliance emerged between KNF and UPDF.

=== Militant activities ===
- On 11 March 2023, KNA members abducted 12 laborers after not receiving the demanded contribution from civilian contractors, suppliers, and laborers involved in the Thanchi road construction project in Bandarban. The project was under the supervision of the Bangladesh Army. Of these laborers, seven were released in exchange for ransom, but five remained held hostage—one of whom suffered bullet injuries. It also kidnapped a retired sergeant of Bangladesh Army who was working as a contractor on road construction. The day after this incident, on 12 March 2023, KNA members fired upon an army patrol team in Bandarban's Rawangchari. This team was responsible for securing a mission to provide free healthcare to mothers and children in remote hilly areas. The initiative was part of the observance of National Children's Day 2023 and the celebration of Independence Day, all under the supervision of the Bangladesh Army. Tragically, Army Master Warrant Officer Nazim Uddin was shot and lost his life on the spot. Additionally, two more army personnel sustained injuries during the attack.
- On 17 May 2023, two soldiers of the Bangladesh Army were killed and two officers were injured in Ruma upazila, Bandarban. The incident occurred as a result of an explosion caused by an improvised explosive device (IED) and unforeseen gunfire from the Kuki-Chin National Army.
- On the night of 2 April 2024, some members of this group robbed the Sonali Bank branch in Ruma upazila, looting around 15 million taka. The next day at noon, group members again attempted to rob two branches of Krishi Bank and Sonali Bank in Thanchi Upazila. Apart from the bank robbery incident, the attackers kidnapped the manager of a Sonali Bank branch, and snatched around 14 firearms of police and Ansar paramilitary forces. Later, the manager was released in exchange for a ransom of Tk1.5 million. After this incident, Bangladesh government suspended the peace talks and combined forces of Bangladesh Army, RAB and police declared full-scale operation to capture KNF insurgents. By 10 April 2024, 55 people allegedly associated with KNF were arrested by Bangladesh Police.
- On 24 November 2024 three Kuki-Chin National Front militants were killed in an operation by the Bangladesh Army.
- On 3 July 2025, the Bangladesh Army conducted an operation in Bandarban District against a KNF camp. The KNF members tried to flee and an exchange of gunfire took places between the two sides. Two bodies of KNF members in uniform were recovered, one of whom was named Puting/Dolly and ranked Major. Three Submachine guns, one rifle and a large amount of ammunition were recovered, along with uniforms and important documents.
- From 25 July to 26 August 2025, the Bangladesh Army conducted an operation against KNF training camps in the Rena Tlang hill range of Ruma Upazila.
