= Roangchari =

- Location in Bangladesh
- Coordinates: 22°10′N 92°20′E
- Country: Bangladesh
- Division: Chittagong Division
- District: Bandarban District
- Time zone: UTC+6 (Bangladesh Time)

Roangchari is a village in Bandarban District in the Chittagong Division of southeastern Bangladesh.
