= Chittagong Hill Tracts Development Board =

Bangladeshi government agency

- পার্বত্য চট্টগ্রাম উন্নয়ন বোর্ড

Agency overview
- Formed: 1976; 50 years ago
- Superseding agency: Development of Chittagong Hill Tracts
- Jurisdiction: Chittagong Hill Tracts
- Headquarters: CHTDB Building, Rangamati-4500, Bangladesh
- Annual budget: Allocated by Government
- Agency executives: Anup Kumar Chakma, Chairman; Ripon Chakma, Vice-Chairman
- Parent department: Government of Bangladesh
- Parent agency: Ministry of Chittagong Hill Tracts Affairs
- Website: www.chtdb.gov.bd

The Chittagong Hill Tracts Development Board is a government agency established in the 1970s by the then president of Bangladesh, Ziaur Rahman, in response to an insurgency led by Shanti Bahini, the armed wing of Parbatya Chattagram Jana Samhati Samiti, in the Chittagong Hill Tracts of Bangladesh.

== History ==
Headed by an army general, the board was formed to provide special attention and administer and solve issues related to the Chittagong Hill Tracts conflict. The board was formed in 1976 through the Chittagong Hill Tracts Development Board Ordinance.

The first chairman from civil administration was Bir Bahadur Ushwi Sing, an MP who was elected from Bandarban constituency and a State Minister of Chittagong Hill Tracts Affairs. He was appointed in 1996. In 2002, Wadud Bhuiyan, a former member of parliament from Khagrachari constituency, was appointed as chairman of the board. In 2009, Bir Bahadur was reappointed as chairman. Naba Bikram Kishore Tripura served as chairman from 2013 till 2021.
