= Chittagong Hill Tracts conflict =

Conflict between the Bangladeshi government and tribal insurgents

Insurgency in the Chittagong Hill Tracts
- Part of the Cold War (first phase) and Terrorism in Bangladesh
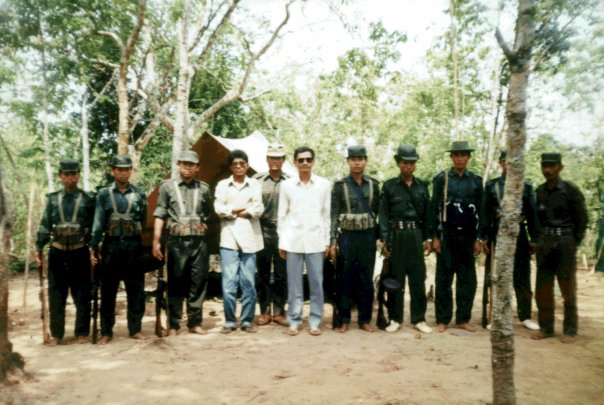
- Shanti Bahini insurgents, photographed on 5 May 1994
Date	First phase: c. 1977 – 2 December 1997 (20 years); Second phase: 20 October 2022 – present
Location	Chittagong Hill Tracts, Bangladesh
Status	Ongoing; First phase ended with the Chittagong Hill Tracts Peace Accord; Second phase started in 2022

Belligerents
First phase: Bangladesh	PCJSS; Logistical support: India	
Second phase: Bangladesh; PCJSS-MN Larma; UPDF-D	PCJSS; UPDF	Kuki-Chin National Front

Commanders and leaders
First phase: (Bangladesh) Ziaur Rahman; (Bangladesh) Abdus Sattar; (Bangladesh) A. F. M. Ahsanuddin Chowdhury; (Bangladesh) Hussain Muhammad Ershad; (Bangladesh) Shahabuddin Ahmed; (Bangladesh) Abdur Rahman Biswas; (Bangladesh) Mashiur Rahman; (Bangladesh) Shah Azizur Rahman; (Bangladesh) Ataur Rahman Khan; (Bangladesh) Mizanur Rahman Chowdhury; (Bangladesh) Moudud Ahmed; (Bangladesh) Kazi Zafar Ahmed; (Bangladesh) Khaleda Zia; (Bangladesh) Muhammad Habibur Rahman; (Bangladesh) Sheikh Hasina; (Bangladesh) Abu Saleh Mohammad Mustafizur Rahman; (Bangladesh) Mohammed Abdul Matin; (Bangladesh) Mohabbat Jan Chowdhury; (Bangladesh) Abdul Mannan Siddique; (Bangladesh) Mahmudul Hasan; (Bangladesh) Abdul Matin Chowdhury; (Bangladesh) Khandaker Mosharraf Hossain; (Bangladesh) Rafiqul Islam; Faiz Uddin Ahmed; ASHK Sadek; Salahuddin Ahmed; A.M. Anisuzzaman; Kazi Jalal Uddin Ahmad; Md. Shamsul Haque Chishti; Mohammad Siddiqur Rahman; Anisur Rahman; M. A. Malek; Md. Hasinur Rahman; Md. Abdul Hakim; Kazi Muhammad; Manzoor e Mawla; Nurul Islam Shishu; Mir Shawkat Ali; Imamuzzaman Chowdhury; Abdus Salam; Ziaur Rahman; Hussain Muhammad Ershad; Atiqur Rahman; Nuruddin Khan; Abu Saleh Mohammad Nasim; Muhammad Mahbubur Rahman; Sadruddin Mohammad Hossain; Sultan Mahmud; Momtaz Uddin Ahmed; Altaf Hossain Chowdhury; Jamal Uddin Ahmed; Atiqur Rahman; R. A. M. Golam Muktadir; Sofi Ahmed Chowdhury; Sadiqur Rahman Chowdhury; Mohammad Abdul Latif; Mohammad Anwar Hossain; Ejaz Ahmed Chowdhury; Mohammad Azizur Rahman; Hossain Ahmed; A. B. M. G. Kibria; M. M. R. Khan; E. A. Chowdhury; Abdur Raquib Khandaker; Taibuddin Ahmed; A. M. Chowdhury; Enamul Huq; A. S. M. Shahjahan; M. Azizul Haq; Md Ismail Hossain; Second phase: Mohammed Shahabuddin; Tarique Rahman; (Bangladesh) Salahuddin Ahmed; Mir Mushfiqur Rahman; Waker-uz-Zaman; Mohammad Ashrafuzzaman Siddiqui; Former: Mohammad Abdul Hamid; Sheikh Hasina; Muhammad Yunus; (Bangladesh) Asaduzzaman Khan; (Bangladesh) M. Sakhawat Hussain; (Bangladesh) Jahangir Alam Chowdhury; Mizanur Rahman Shamim; Waker-uz-Zaman; SM Kamrul Hassan; SM Shafiuddin Ahmed; Shaikh Abdul Hannan; A K M Nazmul Hasan; Shakil Ahmed; Chowdhury Abdullah Al-Mamun; Md. Mainul Islam; Baharul Alam; Shaktiman Chakma X; Tapan Jyoti Chakma X	Second phase: Shantu Larma; Prasit Bikash Khisa Rabi Chakma	First phase: M. N. Larma †; Shantu Larma (surrendered); Second phase: Nathan Bom

Units involved
First phase: Bangladesh Armed Forces; Army; 24th Infantry Division; Air Force; BGB; Ansar–VDP; Police; APBn; Second phase: Army; 24th Infantry Division; BGB	First phase: Shanti Bahini; Second phase: Kuki-Chin National Army	

Strength
115,000–150,000; Army: 33,000—80,000; BGB: 25,000; Ansar–VDP: 5,000; APBn: 10,000	First phase: 2,600–15,000; Second phase: 2,000	

Casualties and losses
- First phase: 6,000+ combatants killed (partial list)
- 3,500–25,000 civilians (Bengali and indigenous villagers); 80,000 civilians displaced; 30,000 deaths; 400+ conflict-related deaths from disease in Bangladesh (June–Aug 1995 only); 7,000+ non-violent deaths among refugees in India (14–21 May 1990 only)

The insurgency in the Chittagong Hill Tracts (Bengali: পার্বত্য চট্টগ্রামে বিদ্রোহ), also known as the Chittagong Hill Tracts conflict (Bengali: পার্বত্য চট্টগ্রাম যুদ্ধ), refers to a political and armed conflict that occurred in Bangladesh in two phases. The first phase took place from 1977 to 1997 between the government of Bangladesh and the Parbatya Chattagram Jana Samhati Samiti (United People's Party of the Chittagong Hill Tracts) and its armed wing, the Shanti Bahini, over the issue of autonomy and the land rights of Jumma people, mainly for Chakma people and the other ethnic minority of Chittagong Hill Tracts. Shanti Bahini launched an insurgency against government forces in 1977, when the country was under military rule, and the conflict continued for twenty years until the government and the PCJSS signed the Chittagong Hill Tracts Peace Accord in 1997. The second phase started in 2022 with the Kuki-Chin National Front under Nathan Bom, who wanted to establish a separate state for Kuki-Chin ethnic groups in Bandarban and Rangamati. The conflict was continuing as of 2025, although raids and operations under Operation Uttaran had somewhat weakened militant groups in CHT.

The actions then carried out by the Armed Forces and the Parbatya Chattagram Jana Samhati Samiti groups resulted in casualties on both sides. There were also reports of mass rapes by the paramilitary Bangladesh Ansar, though these claims are disputed. According to Amnesty International as of June 2013, the Bangladeshi government had still not honoured the terms of the peace accord nor addressed the Jumma people's concerns over the return of their land. Amnesty estimated that 90,000 Jumma families had been displaced internally.

== Background ==
The origin of the conflict in the Chittagong Hill Tracts dates back to the British rule. The British, at the end of the 19th century, reorganized CHT. This resulted in the recognition of three tribal chiefs (rajas) in 1860, (b) enactment of the Chittagong Hill Tracts Frontier Police Regulations in 1881, authorizing a police force from among the hill peoples, and (c) enactment of the Chittagong Hill Tracts Regulations in 1900, giving them rights and autonomy.

When Bangladesh was the eastern wing of Pakistan, widespread resentment occurred over the displacement of as many as 100,000 natives due to the construction of the Kaptai Dam in 1962. The displaced did not receive compensation from the government and many thousands fled to India.

After the creation of Bangladesh in 1971, representatives of the Chittagong Hill Tracts including Manabendra Narayan Larma demanded autonomy and recognition of rights for natives in the Chittagong Hill Tracts. Larma and other Hill Tracts representatives protested the draft of the Constitution of Bangladesh as it did not recognise the ethnic identity and culture of non-Bengalis of Bangladesh. The government policy recognised only Bengali culture and the Bengali language, and designated all citizens of Bangladesh as Bengalis. In a discussion with a team led by Manabendra Narayan Larma, it was claimed that Bangladesh's the then head of state, Sheikh Mujibur Rahman said that the natives of the Chittagong Hill Tracts are all yet still Bengalis and must accept it which later was proven to be a false allegation.

The migrated hill Jummas were given with special treatment, as they were the minority after independence in 1971. The rebellion by the Jummas began after the independence of Bangladesh.

== Insurgency ==
=== First Phase: 1977–1997 ===
M. N. Larma and others founded the Parbatya Chattagram Jana Samhati Samiti (PCJSS) as a united political organisation of all native peoples and tribes in 1973. The armed wing of PCJSS, Shanti Bahini was organised to resist government policies. The crisis aggravated during the regime of Sheikh Mujibur Rahman, and the successive military governments that followed after his assassination in 1975. In 1977, the Shanti Bahini launched their first attack on a Bangladesh Army convoy.

It is alleged that the Indian government helped the Shanti Bahini set up bases across the border from Bangladesh. According to a spokesperson of Shanti Bahini, they received military assistance from India after the assassination of Sheikh Mujibur Rahman. Their spokesman, Bimal Chakma, stated, ''At the beginning we got some consideration, but it is very low compared with what we need.''

The Shanti Bahini divided its area of operations into zones and recruited natives, who were formally trained. The Shanti Bahini led attacks on Bangladesh Police and army men, government offices, personnel and Bengalis in the region. The group also attacked any native who didn't support the rebellion against the Bangladeshi government. According to government sources between 1980 and 1991, 1,180 people were killed by the Shanti Bahini, and 582 were kidnapped.

400 Chakmas including Anupam Chakma absconded to India to evade arrest or capture by Bangladeshi forces in 1989. Demographically, Chakmas were the dominant native community in the Chittagong Hill Tracts, so naturally Chakmas dominated the Shanti Bahini.

G. M. Mushfiqur Rahman, a lieutenant in the Bangladesh Army posted in 1 Field Artillery Regiment of Bangladesh Army in Chittagong Hill Tracts on 8 September 1989 led a 17—member team of Bangladesh Army personnel and attacked a Shanti Bahini camp. Lieutenant Rahman was injured during the clash and died on that day at 8:15 am. He was posthumously awarded with Bir Uttom, the second highest award in Bangladesh for individual gallantry.

On 11 September 1996, Shanti Bahini rebels reportedly abducted and killed 28 to 30 Bengali woodcutters.

==== Detention ====
People living in the Hill Tracts area were often detained and tortured in custody on suspicion of being members of the Shanti Bahini or helping them. There were numerous check posts on highways and ferries in the Chittagong Hill Tracts.

People who are detained on suspicion are subjected to severe beating, electrocution, water boarding, hanging upside down, shoving burning cigarettes on bodies etc. Prisoners are detained in pits and trenches. The captives are then taken out for interrogation one at a time.

==== Peace accord ====
Peace negotiations were initiated after the restoration of democracy in Bangladesh in 1991, but little progress was made with the government of Prime Minister Begum Khaleda Zia, the widow of Ziaur Rahman and her Bangladesh Nationalist Party. Fresh rounds of talks began in 1996 with the newly elected prime minister Sheikh Hasina Wajed of the Awami League, the daughter of Sheikh Mujibur Rahman. The peace accord was finalised and formally signed on 2 December 1997.

The agreement recognised the special status of the hill residents. Chakma rebels were still in the Chittagong Hill Tracts as of 2002.

Chakmas also live in Tripura, India, where an insurgency in Tripura lasted between 1989 and 2024.

=== 2018 ambush ===
21 years after the peace treaty on 5 May 2018 unidentified gunmen ambushed and assassinated 5 people in Rangamati district, including UPDF leader, Tapan Jyoti Chakma. It is suspected the attack was caused by conflicts between factions. This is the deadliest such incident involving the indigenous tribal community since the signing of the Chittagong Hill Tracts Peace Accord in 1997.

=== Second Phase: since 2022 ===
The secessionist Kuki-Chin National Front led by Nathan Bom begun to fight for the establishment of a separate autonomous or independent state for the Jumma and Kuki-Chin people, using guerrilla methods since 2022.

Amidst intelligence reports of insurgency buildup in the region, on 20 October 2022, Bangladesh authorities issued a travel ban in the Bandarban district.

By early 2023, clashes between KNF cadres and security forces had intensified. On 28 January 2023, a KNA fighter was killed in a gunfight with the Bangladesh Army in Ruma Upazila, in the Artha Para and Bachlang Para areas, according to the South Asia Terrorism Portal. A few months later, on 17 May 2023, two Bangladesh Army officers were killed and two more wounded in an ambush involving an IED and small-arms fire by KNA fighters.

Despite the violence, there were efforts to negotiate. A Peace Establishment Committee was formed under the Bandarban Hill District Council in mid-2023 to engage the KNF in talks. On 5 March 2024, the KNF agreed to a one-month ceasefire and pledged to refrain from attacks, as part of efforts to sustain dialogue. However, those peace talks broke down: in April 2024, the council announced the suspension of negotiations, as a cause of ongoing KNF attacks and violations of prior memoranda of understanding.

The group's operations then began to grow bolder. On the night of 2 April 2024, KNF militants carried out a high-profile bank robbery, raiding a Sonali Bank branch in Ruma, and reportedly looting around 15 million takas. During the same episode they allegedly abducted the bank manager; he was later released after mediation. In response, Bangladeshi security forces launched a major pincer movement involving the Army, Rapid Action Battalion (RAB), Border Guard Bangladesh (BGB), and police. Over several operations, they arrested dozens of suspected KNF militants: in April 2024, 53 cadres were detained in multiple coordinated raids. Meanwhile, on 24 November 2024, the Bangladesh Army confirmed that three KNF militants were killed in a jungle raid in Ruma after a tip-off about a clandestine hideout.

In May 2025, more than 20,000 combat-style uniforms were seized from a garment factory in Chittagong; the police linked the consignment to the KNF. In June 2025, authorities arrested four persons, including a factory director, after seizing a vehicle from which they recovered uniform material allegedly destined for the KNF.

A major development came in 2025 when the Army dismantled a KNF training camp in Ruma Upazila. Over a month-long operation from July until August, troops uncovered weapons-training gear, wooden mock rifles, trenches, bunkers, and other infrastructure.

Kongchainyo Marma, the head of the northern armed wing of the Mog Liberation Party, was killed in an army raid in Shantinagar, Khagrachhari Sadar Upazila on 15 August.

== Government reaction ==
A map of the Chittagong Hill Tracts.

At the outbreak of the insurgency, the government of Bangladesh deployed the army to begin counter-insurgency operations. The then-president Ziaur Rahman created the Chittagong Hill Tracts Development Board under an army general to address the socio-economic needs of the region, but the entity proved unpopular and became a source of antagonism and mistrust amongst the native people against the government. The government struggled to address the long-standing issue of the displacement of people, numbering an estimated 100,000 caused by the construction of the Kaptai Dam in 1962. Displaced people did not receive compensation and more than 40,000 Chakma people had fled to India. In the 1980s, the government began settling Bengalis in the region, causing the eviction of many natives and a significant alteration of demographics. Having constituted only 11.6% of the regional population in 1974, the number of Bengalis grew by 1991 to constitute 48.5% of the regional population.

In 1989, the government of President Hossain Mohammad Ershad passed the District Council Act, creating three tiers of local government councils to devolve powers and responsibilities to the representatives of the native peoples; the councils were rejected and opposed by PCJSS.

== Persecution ==
The persecution of the indigenous tribes of the Chittagong Hill Tracts, including the Chakma, Marma, Tripura and others, who are mainly Buddhists, has been described as genocidal. There are also accusations of Chakmas being forced to leave their religion, many of them children who have been abducted for this purpose. The government encouraged and sponsored massive settlement of Bangladeshis in the region, which reduced the indigenous proportion of the population from 98 per cent in 1971 to fifty per cent by 2000. During this conflict, which officially ended in 1997, and during the subsequent period, a large number of human rights violations against the indigenous peoples were reported, with violence against indigenous women being particularly extreme.

== See also ==
- Partition of India
- Chittagong Hill Tracts manual
- Persecution of Hindus in Bangladesh
- Persecution of Buddhists in Bangladesh
- Persecution of Ahmadis in Bangladesh
- Persecution of Christians in Bangladesh
- Freedom of religion in Bangladesh
- Human rights in Bangladesh
