= Jyotirindra Bodhipriya Larma =

Bangladeshi politician

Shantu Larma
- সন্তু লারমা 𑄥𑄧𑄚𑄴𑄖𑄪 𑄣𑄢𑄴𑄟
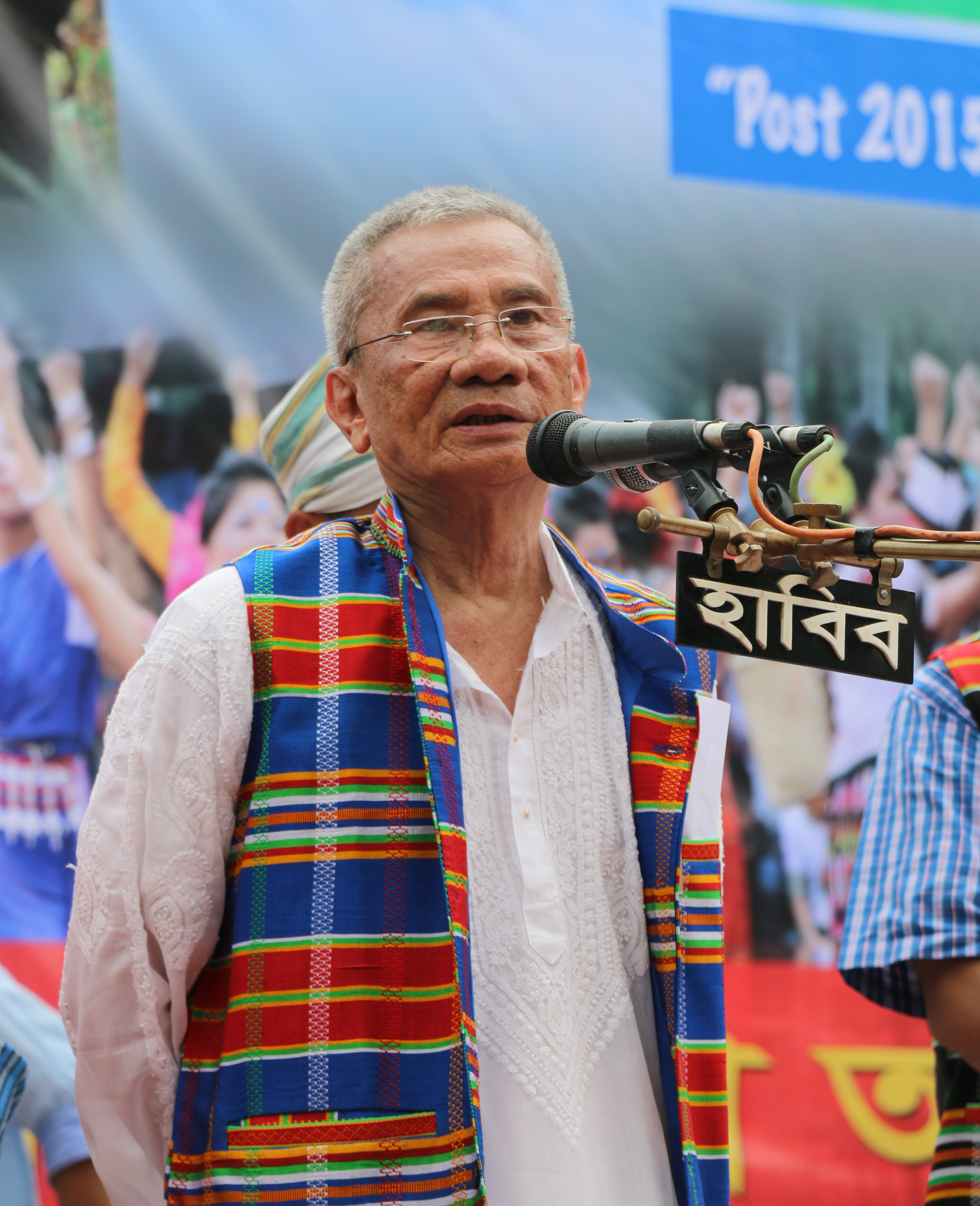
- Larma on 2015 Adivasi Day at Shaheed Minar, Dhaka

President of PCJSS
- Incumbent
- Assumed office 10 November 1983
- Preceded by: Manabendra Narayan Larma

Chairman of Chittagong Hill Tracts Regional Council
- Incumbent
- Assumed office 27 May 1999
- Preceded by: Office Established

Personal details
- Born: 14 February 1944 (age 82) Rangamati, Bengal, British India now Bangladesh
- Party: Parbatya Chattagram Jana Samhati Samiti
- Relatives: Manabendra Narayan Larma (brother)
- Occupation: Politician, businessman
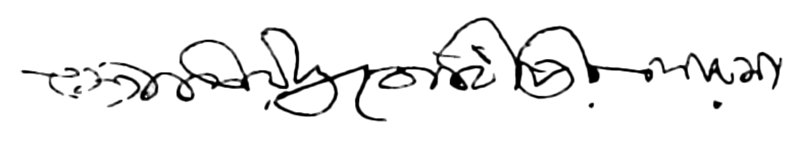
- Signature

Jyotirindra Bodhipriya Larma (known as Shantu Larma; born 14 February 1944) is a Bangladeshi Chakma politician and one of the main leaders of the Parbatya Chattagram Jana Samhati Samiti (PCJSS). He also headed the Shanti Bahini militia until it was disarmed in 1997. He is the brother of late Chakma parliamentarian and PCJSS founder Manabendra Narayan Larma. He is also heads the Bangladesh Adivasi Forum (Bangladesh Indigenous Peoples Forum), and Chittagong Hill Tracts Regional Council.
