= Manabendra Narayan Larma =

Bangladeshi politician (1939–1983)

- মানবেন্দ্র নারায়ণ লারমা 𑄟𑄚𑄧𑄝𑄬𑄚𑄴𑄘𑄳𑄢𑄧 𑄚𑄢𑄠𑄧𑄚𑄴 𑄣𑄢𑄴𑄟
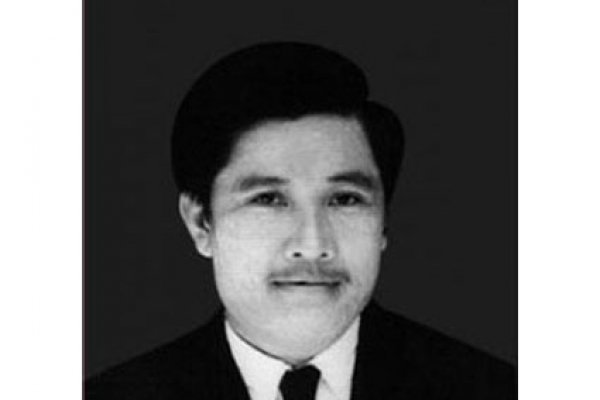

Member of the Bangladesh Parliament for Chittagong Hill Tracts-1
- In office 1973–1975
- Preceded by: Constituency established
- Succeeded by: Upendra Lal Chakma

President of the PCJSS
- In office 1972 – 24 June 1972
- Preceded by: Position established
- Succeeded by: Birendra Kishore Roaza

Personal details
- Born: 15 September 1939 Naniarchar, Bengal, British India (now Bangladesh)
- Died: 10 November 1983 (aged 44) Khagrachari, Chittagong, Bangladesh
- Cause of death: Assassination
- Party: Parbatya Chattagram Jana Samhati Samiti
- Relatives: Shantu Larma (brother)
- Education: Chittagong College
- Occupation: Teacher, lawyer and politician

Military service
- Allegiance: Shanti Bahini
- Years of service: 1972–1983
- Rank: Founding leader
- Battles/wars: Chittagong Hill Tracts conflict (first phase)

Manabendra Narayan Larma (15 September 1939 – 10 November 1983; also known by his initials M.N. Larma) was a Bangladeshi politician and member of parliament. A leading proponent of the rights of the people of the Chittagong Hill Tracts, he was the founding leader of the Parbatya Chattagram Jana Samhati Samiti (United People's Party of the Chittagong Hill Tracts) and its armed wing, the Shanti Bahini.

== Early life ==
Manabendra Narayan Larma was born on 15 September 1939, at Maorum (Mahapuram) village, which is now drowned under the Kaptai Lake of Kaptai Dam. He belonged to the Chakma tribe, which inhabits in the Chittagong Hill Tracts of Bangladesh and the neighbouring Indian states of Mizoram and Tripura. He graduated in 1963 from the Government College in Chittagong, completed his Bachelor of Education degree in 1968 from the Comilla Teachers' Training College and law degree in 1970 from the Chittagong Law College. Larma began working as a lawyer in the Chittagong District of East Pakistan. He became active in politics as a student, helping to organise a Hill Tracts students conference in 1963 and campaigning for proper compensation for the people of the Hill Tracts displaced from their homestead and villages by the Kaptai hydroelectric project. He was arrested on 10 February 1963, under the East Pakistan Public Security Ordinance by police. He was released after two years of incarceration on 8 March 1965.

== Political career ==
After his release, Larma worked to unite and politically organise the various ethnic groups and tribes of the Chittagong Hill Tracts. In the 1970 elections, he was elected to the East Pakistan Provincial Assembly as an independent candidate. After the creation of Bangladesh, Larma sought the recognition of the rights of the people of the Hill Tracts and regional autonomy. He was the lone representative of the Chittagong Hill Tracts in the inaugural national legislature. He opposed the drafted Constitution of Bangladesh, which made official the primacy of Bengali culture and did not recognise the non-Bengali ethnic groups and tribal communities living in Bangladesh. Larma's demands were rejected by the country's founding leader Sheikh Mujibur Rahman, who reportedly said that the tribal peoples should adopt Bengali culture and identity and threatened to forcibly settle Bengalis in the Hill Tracts and convert the local people into a minority in their own province. Larma continued to fight for the rights of the indigenous people and is quoted as saying:

Under no definition or logic can a Chakma be a Bengali or a Bengali be a Chakma. A Bengali living in Pakistan cannot become or be called a Punjabi, Pathan or Sindhi and any of them living in Bangladesh cannot be called a Bengali. As citizens of Bangladesh we are all Bangladeshis but we also have a separate ethnic identity, which unfortunately the Awami League (the then-ruling party) leaders do not want to understand.

=== Shanti Bahini ===
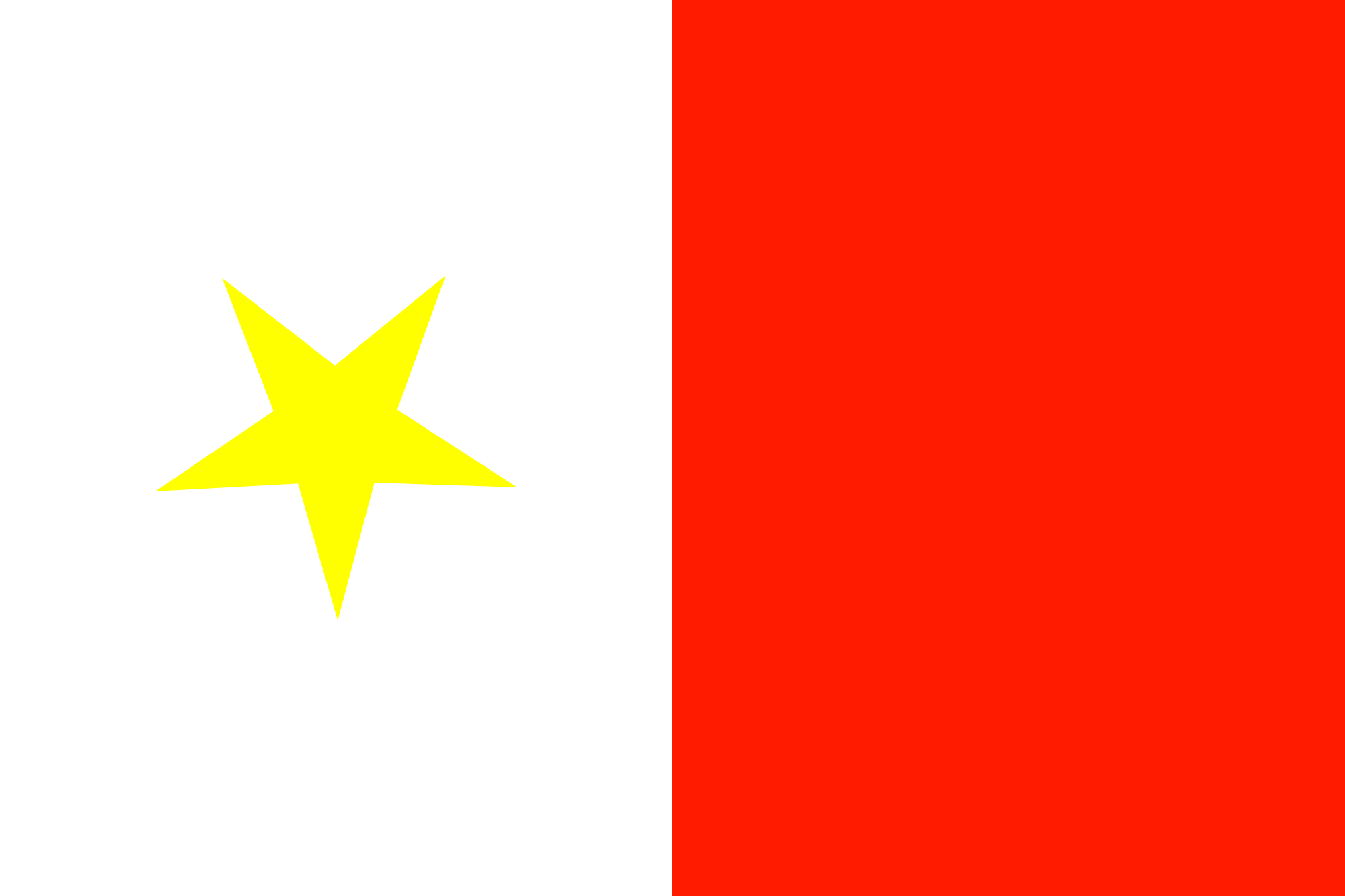
Flag of Shanti Bahini

On 15 February 1972, Larma founded the Parbatya Chattagram Jana Samhati Samiti (PCJSS), seeking to build an organisation representing all the Jumma Peoples of the Hill Tracts. Larma was elected to the Jatiya Sangsad, the national legislature of Bangladesh as candidate of the PCJSS in 1973. When Larma's continued efforts to make the state recognise the rights of the Jumma peoples failed, Larma and the PCJSS began organising the Shanti Bahini (Peace Corps), an armed force operating in the Hill Tracts area, which began attacking state forces in 1977. Being the main leader of the PCJSS and the Shanti Bahini, Larma consequently went underground, into hiding from state security forces. However, factionalism within the PCJSS weakened Larma's standing and he was assassinated on 10 November 1983.
