= Shanti Bahini =

Insurgent group in Chittagong Hill Tracts, Bangladesh

- শান্তি বাহিনী
- Flag of Shanti Bahini
- Leaders: M.N. Larma; Shantu Larma
- Dates active: 1972–1997 (small pockets of resistance remained active until 2006)
- Active regions: Chittagong Hill Tracts, Bangladesh
- Ideology: Autonomy for tribes of the Chittagong Hill Tracts
- Size: 5,000–7,000
- Part of: Parbatya Chattagram Jana Samhati Samiti
- Wars: the Chittagong Hill Tracts conflict

The Shanti Bahini (Bengali: শান্তি বাহিনী; "Peace Force") was the armed wing of Parbatya Chattagram Jana Samhati Samiti in Bangladesh. It is considered as a insurgent group in Bangladesh. Most of its members were ethnically Chakma.

== History ==
After Bangladesh's independence in 1971, Manabendra Narayan Larma founded PCJSS on 15 February 1972, aiming to represent natives of the Chittagong Hill Tracts. Larma was elected to the Jatiya Sangsad. After peaceful efforts to gain recognition failed, the PCJSS organized the Shanti Bahini in 1972 to wage armed warfare against the Bangladeshi government.

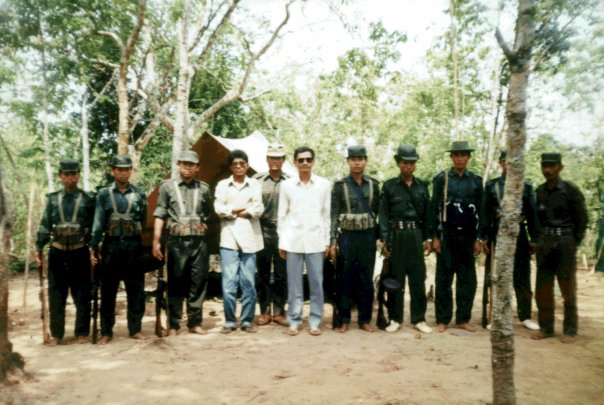
Members of Shanti Bahini in Khagrachari, 5 May 1994

They began attacking Bangladesh Army convoys in 1977. Larma went into hiding and was assassinated on 10 November 1983.

On 23 June 1981, Shanti Bahini militants attacked a Bangladesh Rifles camp, and killed 13 people and later executed 24 more.

=== Attacks ===
In the 1980s, to resettle landless Bengalis, the government granted them land in the Hill Tracts, displacing many tribal people. On 31 May 1984, Shanti Bahini members killed 400 Bengalis at Bhushanchhara.

On 29 April 1986, they massacred 19 Bengalis. On 26 June 1989, they burned villages whose inhabitants had participated in elections.

In 1996, they abducted and killed 30 Bengalis, and massacred Bengali lumberjacks.

=== Peace Accord ===
On 2 December 1997, the Chittagong Hill Tracts Peace Accord was signed and the Shanti Bahini agreed to disarm. They surrendered weapons in Khagrachhari, leading to removal of a curfew and 50,000 refugees gradually attempted to return. However, dissidents formed groups like the United People’s Democratic Front. The Bangladesh Nationalist Party criticised the accord, which remains partially unimplemented.

In August 2014, Border Security Force troops arrested five Chakmas with arms in Mizoram.

Before this, following the assassination of Sheikh Mujibur Rahman in 1975, India reportedly sheltered and supported Shanti Bahini, and trained them in Chakrata, India.

== See also ==
- Demographics of Bangladesh
