= Parbatya Chattagram Jana Samhati Samiti =

Bangladeshi political party

Parbatya Chattagram Jana Samhati Samiti: পার্বত্য চট্টগ্রাম জনসংহতি সমিতি; United People's Party of the Chittagong Hill Tracts
- Abbreviation: PCJSS
- President: Shantu Larma
- General Secretary: Ushatan Talukder
- Founder: Manabendra Narayan Larma; Birendra Kishore Roaza
- Founded: 1972 (54 years ago)
- Headquarters: Rangamati, Chittagong Hill Tracts, Bangladesh
- Student wing: Parbatya chattagram pahari chatra parishad
- Youth wing: Parbatya chattagram Jubo Samiti
- Armed wing: Shanti Bahini (disbanded)
- Women's Wing: Parbatya Chattagram Mohila Samiti
- Ideology: Autonomy for the indigenous tribes of the Chittagong Hill Tracts
- Political position: Left-wing to far-left
- Bangladesh Parliament: ' 0 / 350

Party flag

Website
- pcjss.org

The Parbatya Chattagram Jana Samhati Samiti (Bengali: পার্বত্য চট্টগ্রাম জনসংহতি সমিতি; United People's Committee of the Chittagong Hill Tracts; abbreviated PCJSS) is a left-wing political party in Bangladesh formed to represent minority communities and small tribes of the Chittagong Hill Tracts. Since its inception in 1972, the PCJSS has fought for autonomy and the recognition of the ethnic identity and rights of the tribes of the Hill Tracts. Its former armed wing, the Shanti Bahini (now disbanded), used to fight government forces and Bengali Muslim settlers in the Chittagong Hill Tracts. A peace accord signed in 1997 led to the disarmament of the Shanti Bahini and enabled the PCJSS to return to mainstream politics.

== Background ==
The roots of the PCJSS can be traced to the Hill Tracts Students' Association and the Parbatya Chattagram Upajatiya Kalyan Samiti (United People's Welfare and Development Committee of the Chittagong Hill Tracts) that were organised in the 1960s in what was then, East Pakistan. The organisations agitated on behalf of the 100,000 natives displaced by the construction of the Kaptai Dam, seeking rehabilitation and compensation. After the creation of Bangladesh in 1971, representatives of the Chittagong Hill Tracts such as the Chakma politicians Charu Bikash Chakma and Manabendra Narayan Larma sought autonomy and recognition of the rights of the peoples of the region. Larma and others protested the draft of the Constitution of Bangladesh, although the Constitution recognised the ethnic identity but Larma and others wanted full sovereignty and separation from Bangladesh. The government policy recognised only the Bengali culture and the Bengali language and designating all citizens of Bangladesh as Bengalis. In talks with Hill Tracts delegation led by Manabendra Narayan Larma, the country's founding leader Sheikh Mujibur Rahman insisted that the ethnic groups of the Hill Tracts adopt the Bengali identity. Sheikh Mujib is also reported to have threatened to forcibly settle Bengalis in the Hill Tracts to turn the natives into a minority. The PCJSS held its first national conference on 24 June 1972 at Indrapuri Cinema Hall of Rangamati town. A 60-member Central Committee of PCJSS was constituted with Birendra Kishore Roaza as president and M. N. Larma as the general secretary.

== Four-point manifesto and foundation ==
On 24 April 1972, Manabendra Narayan Larma presented a four-point manifesto to the constitution drafting committee, which sought:

1. Autonomy for the Chittagong Hill Tracts and the creation of its own Legislative Assembly.
2. Inclusion in the constitution of a statute like the Regulation of 1900 that safeguarded the identity and rights of the people of the Hill Tracts.
3. Preservation of the positions of tribal chiefs and tribal customs and laws.
4. Prohibition of amendments to the statute enshrining the Regulation of 1900 and the settlement of Bengalis in the Hill Tracts.

The manifesto was summarily rejected by the government, causing resentment and dissatisfaction amongst the people of the Hill Tracts. On 15 February 1973, representatives and activists of the Hill Tracts founded the Parbatya Chhattagram Jana Samhatti Samiti (PCJSS) under Manabendra Narayan Larma's leadership. The party's official aims and objectives included humanism, nationalism, democracy, secularism and the protection of the rights, culture and ethnic identity, and autonomy for the tribes of the Hill Tracts. The PCJSS sought to unify and represent all the tribes of the Hill Tracts and also organised a committee of villages, a student wing and youth wing and a women's wing of the party.

== Insurgency ==
Dissatisfaction and anger due to government opposition to their demands led the PCJSS to organise the Shanti Bahini (Peace forces) as military force to launch an armed struggle to win autonomy and secure the rights of the people of the Hill Tracts. Many insurgents are believed to have trained, equipped and sheltered in the neighbouring Indian state of Tripura. During the insurgency, the PCJSS strongly opposed the government-driven settlement of Bengali Muslims in the Hill Tracts as a ploy to marginalise the tribes in their home region. The PCJSS also rejected the Chittagong Hill Tracts Development Board and other government plans for local councils. After an insurgency that lasted for almost two decades, the PCJSS entered into peace talks with the government after the restoration of democracy in 1991. However, little progress was made with the government of prime minister Khaleda Zia and the Bangladesh Nationalist Party. Fresh rounds of talks began in 1996 with the newly elected prime minister Sheikh Hasina Wajed of the Awami League, a daughter of Sheikh Mujib. The peace accord was finalised and formally signed on 2 December 1997. The peace accord provided for greater autonomy, the return of land to displaced tribals and special status for the ethnic groups and tribes. The accord also created a central ministry of tribal affairs and an elected regional council that would be empowered to govern the Hill Tracts and oversee local tribal councils. The accord also granted official recognition of the ethnic groups and tribes.

After the treaty was signed, Shanti Bahini insurgents formally laid down their arms and more than 50,000 displaced natives were able to return to their homes. The PCJSS emerged as a mainstream political party.

== Recent activities ==
Since the signing of the peace accord, the PCJSS has emerged as a mainstream political party and is currently headed by Jyotirindra Bodhipriya Larma, the younger brother of Manabendra Narayan Larma, who is also the chairman of the CHT regional council. The PCJSS has continued to agitate for the full and proper implementation of the peace accord and has alleged lack of government action and intimidation by security forces and demanded the withdrawal of Operation Uttaran. The PCJSS has protested the rise of Islamism and Islamic terrorism in the region from groups based in Bangladesh and neighbouring Burma.

On 12 February 2025, Mizoram Police reportedly arrested PCJSS fighters Roni Chakma, Anirban Chakma, and Ribeng Chakma. They confiscated two AK-47s, five M4 carbines, twenty magazines, and thousands of rounds of ammunition, along with cash and other items.

On 4 June 2025, Indian Police arrested 13 fighters of the PCJSS in Agartala, Tripura, India and one of the arrested was a 17-year-old Bitu Chakma. On 19 June 2025, India's security forces reportedly seized methamphetamine tablets valued at approximately Rs 104.3 million (about US$1.3 million) in Mizoram, allegedly belonging to the PCJSS."

== Jumma Liberation Army ==
On 1 July 2025, the new armed wing of the PCJSS "Jumma Liberation Army" abducted six tribal villagers. The abducted were Dhanamuni Chakma (19), Sukesh Chakma (22), Lakshi Shanti Chakma (35), Bhanga Hada Chakma (35), Shan Bikash Chakma (36), and Hullaya Chakma (22) from the remote Rangapani Chhara village in Rangamati District. The JLA demanded BDT 600,000 (approximately $5,500) for their release.

Pragna Tapas Chakma, president of the CHTIPYF alleged "the PCJSS is a paramilitary force of the Government of Bangladesh because it holds the government of the CHT Regional Council established under the CHT Regional Council Act of 1998". He further accused the Bangladesh government of allowing the PCJSS to control the CHT Regional Council without elections for 27 years, while also permitting it to maintain a militia involved in "kidnapping, extortion, and murder of tribal civilians." CHTIPYF further alleged that since taking control of the CHT Regional Council, the group has been involved in a range of illicit activities including child soldier recruitment, arms smuggling, drug trafficking, torture, and the murder of "hundreds, if not thousands, of innocent tribal peoples" in the Chittagong Hill Tracts region.

== See also ==
- Chittagong Hill Tracts Conflict
- Chittagong Hill Tracts manual
- Santu Larma
