= Hill station =

Mountain resort in European colonies

Shimla, a city founded as a hill station, served as the summer capital of British India. The city's urban planning and architecture were designed to foster a European experience for homesick colonial officials and executives.

A hill station is a type of hill town, mostly in colonial Asia, but also in colonial Africa (albeit rarely), founded by European colonists as a refuge from the summer heat. As historian Dane Kennedy observes about the Indian context, "the hill station (...) was seen as an exclusive British preserve: here it was possible to render the Indian into an outsider". The term is still used in present day, particularly in India, which has the largest number of hill stations; most are situated at an altitude of approximately 1,000 to 2,500 metres (3,300 to 8,200 ft).

== History ==
=== In South Asia ===
Hill stations in British India were established for a variety of reasons. One of the first reasons in the early 1800s was to act as sanitoria for the ailing family members of British officials. After the rebellion of 1857, the British "sought further distance from what they saw as a disease-ridden land by [escaping] to the Himalayas in the north". Other factors included anxieties about the dangers of life in India, among them "fear of degeneration brought on by too long residence in a debilitating land". The hill stations were meant to reproduce the home country, illustrated in Lord Lytton's statement about Ootacamund in the 1870s as having "such beautiful English rain, such delicious English mud." Shimla was officially made the "summer capital of India" in the 1860s and hill stations "served as vital centres of political and military power, especially after the 1857 revolt."

As noted by Indian historian Vinay Lal, hill stations in India also served "as spaces for the colonial structuring of a segregational and ontological divide between Indians and Europeans, and as institutional sites of imperial power." William Dalrymple wrote that "[t]he viceroy was the spider at the heart of Simla's web: From his chambers in the Viceregal Lodge, he pulled the strings of an empire that stretched from Rangoon in the east to Aden in the west." Meanwhile, Judith T Kenny observed that the hill station was "a landscape type tied to nineteenth-century discourses of imperialism and climate. Both discourses serve as evidence of a belief in racial difference and, thereby, the imperial hill station reflected and reinforced a framework of meaning that influenced European views of the non-western world in general." Speaking about the development of hill stations like Mussoorie, Shekhar Pathak, historian of Himalayan cultures, noted that "the needs of this (European) elite created colonies in Dehradun of Indians to cater to them." This "exclusive, clean, and secure social space – known as an enclave – for white Europeans ... evolved to become the seats of government and foci of elite social activity", and created racial distinctions which perpetuated British colonial power and oppression, as Nandini Bhattacharya notes. Dane Kennedy observed that "the hill station, then, was seen as an exclusive British preserve: here it was possible to render the Indian into an outsider".

Kennedy, following Monika Bührlein, identifies three stages in the evolution of hill stations in India: high refuge, high refuge to hill station, and hill station to town. The first settlements started in the 1820s, primarily as sanitoria. In the 1840s and 1850s, there was a wave of new hill stations, with the main impetus being "places to rest and recuperate from the arduous life on the plains". In the second half of the 19th century, there was a period of consolidation, with few new hill stations. In the final phase, "hill stations reached their zenith in the late nineteenth century. The political importance of the official stations was underscored by the inauguration of large and costly public-building projects."

The term "hill station" has been used loosely in India (and more broadly South Asia) since the mid-20th century to describe any town or settlement in a mountainous area which attempts to expand its local economy toward tourism, or has been invested by recent mass tourism practices. Kullu and Manali in the Indian state of Himachal Pradesh are two examples of that shift in the meaning of "hill station". These two historical settlements existed prior to the British, and have not been extensively modified or shaped by them, or even particularly frequented by them. However, the rise of internal domestic tourism in India from the eighties and the subsequent growth in hill station practice by urban middle-class Indians contributed to the labelling of these two localities as hill stations. Munnar, a settlement in the state of Kerala whose economy is primarily based on tea cultivation and processing as well as plantation agriculture, is another example of a hill town transformed by modern tourism into a hill station.

== List of hill stations ==
=== Africa ===
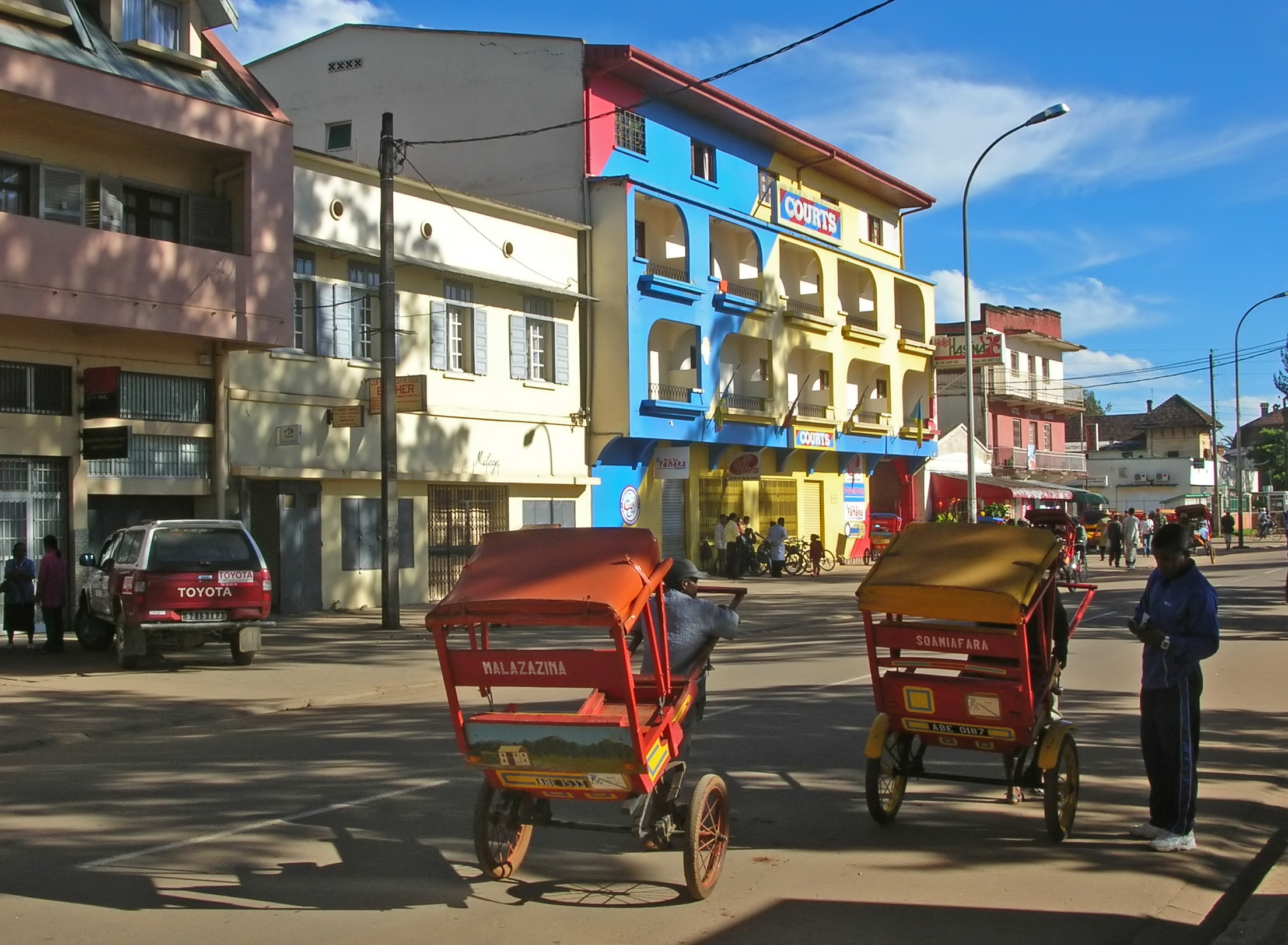
Antsirabe, Madagascar

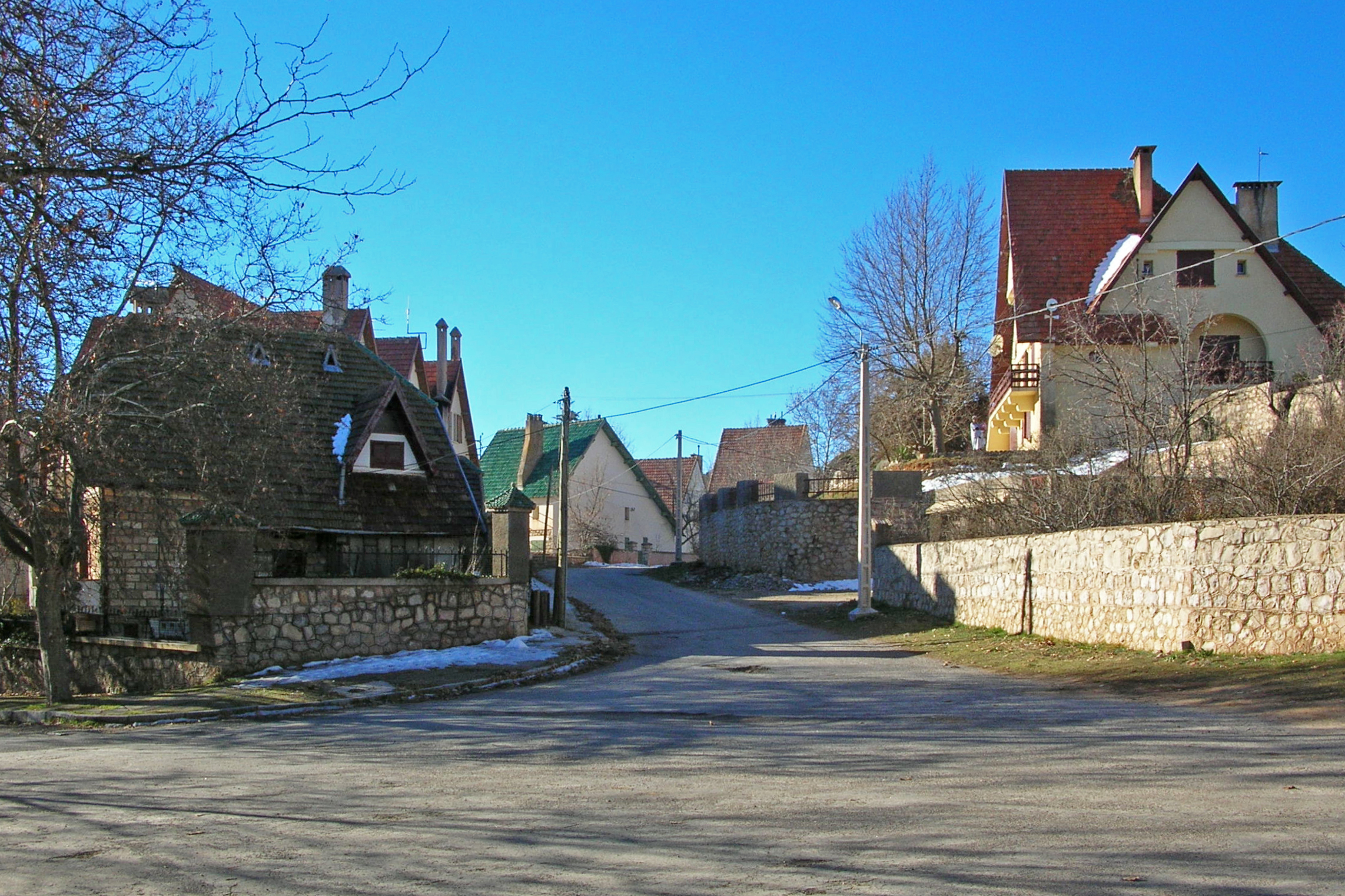
Ifrane, in the Moroccan Atlas, reproduces an idealized Douce France, offering a synthesis of traditional architecture from several French regions, displayed across the chalets and villas dotting the garden city.

- Antsirabe, Madagascar
- Ifrane, Morocco
- Jos, Nigeria
- Fort Portal, Uganda

=== Americas ===
- Petropolis, Brazil
- Campos do Jordão, Brazil
- Monteverde, Costa Rica
- Arteaga, Coahuila, Mexico
- Mazamitla, Jalisco, Mexico
- San Miguel de Allende, Guanajuato, Mexico
- Tepoztlán, Morelos, Mexico
- Valle de Bravo, Estado de México, Mexico
- Beech Mountain, North Carolina, United States
- Sky Valley, Georgia, United States
- Big Bear Lake, California, United States
- Cloudcroft, New Mexico, United States
- Summerhaven, Arizona, United States

=== Asia ===
==== Bangladesh ====
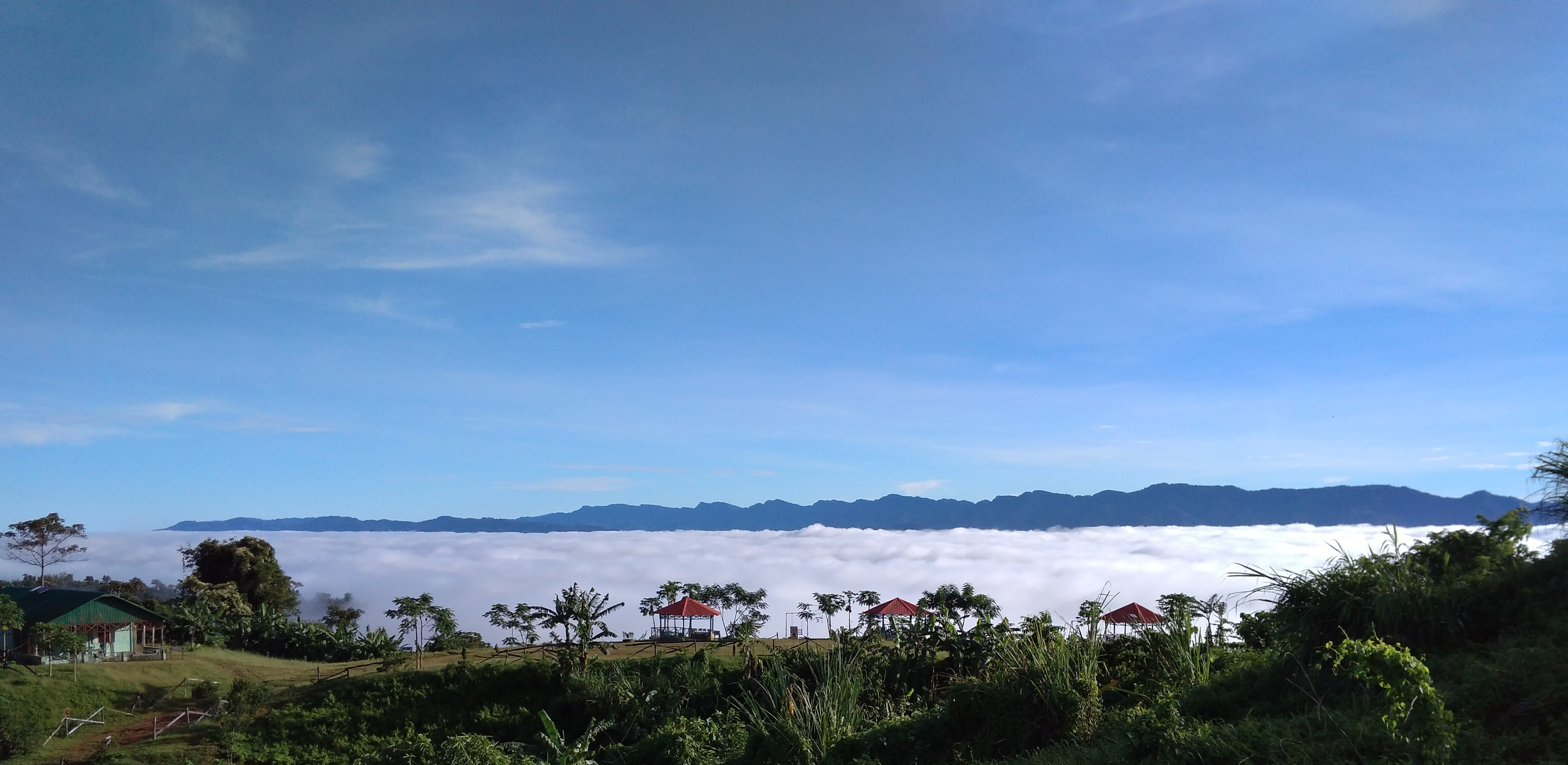
Sajek Valley, Rangamati Hill District, Bangladesh, the most popular hill station and summer destination in Bangladesh

- Sajek Valley
- Bandarban
- Jaflong
- Khagrachari
- Moulvibazar
- Rangamati
- Sreemangal

==== Cambodia ====
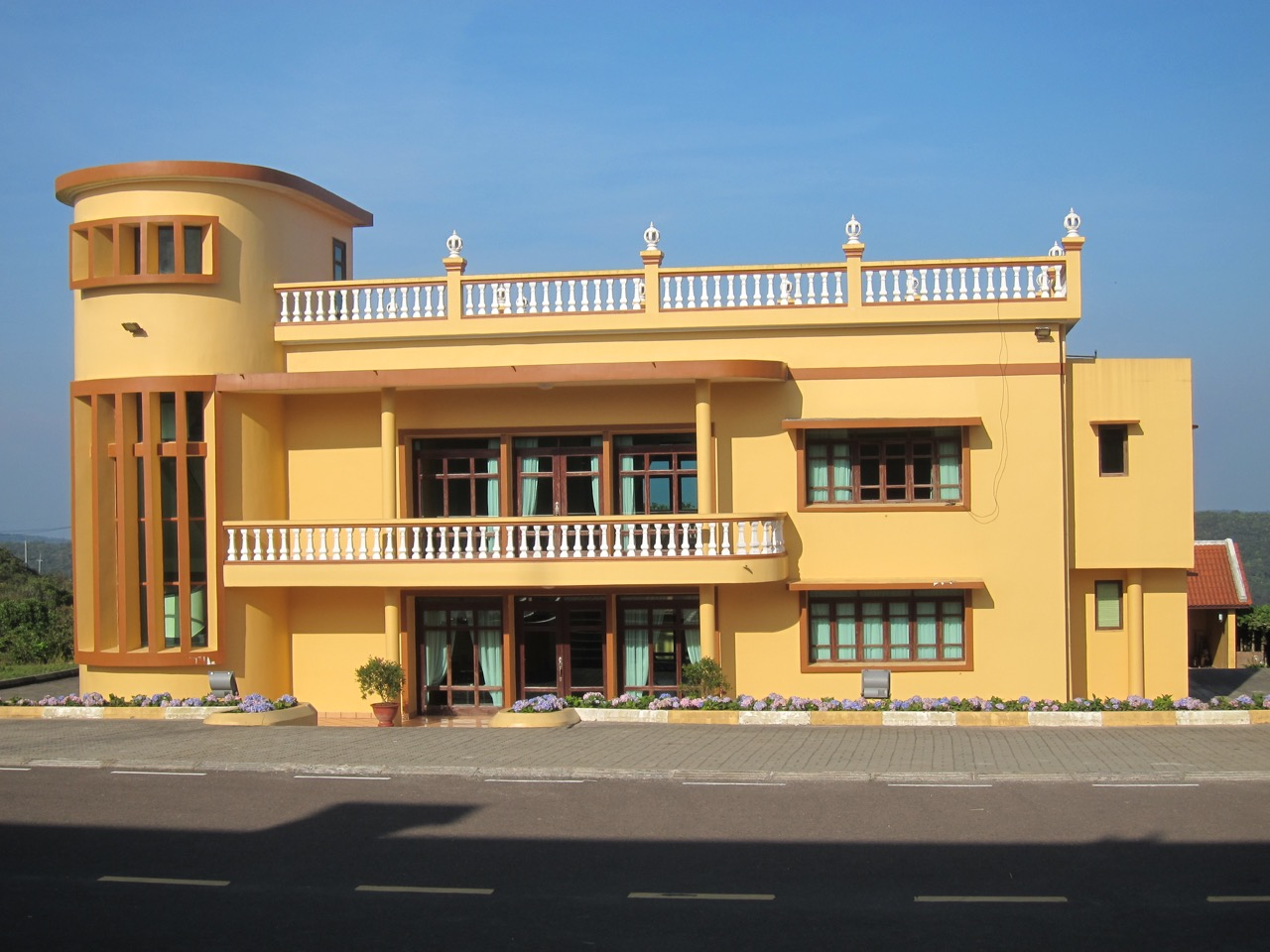
Former residence of King Sisowath Monivong at Phnom Bokor

- Bokor Hill Station

==== China ====
- Kuling (Guling) in Jiangxi Province
- Mount Mogan
- Mount Jigong
- Guling, Fujian Province
- Beidaihe

===== Hong Kong =====
- Victoria Peak

==== Cyprus ====
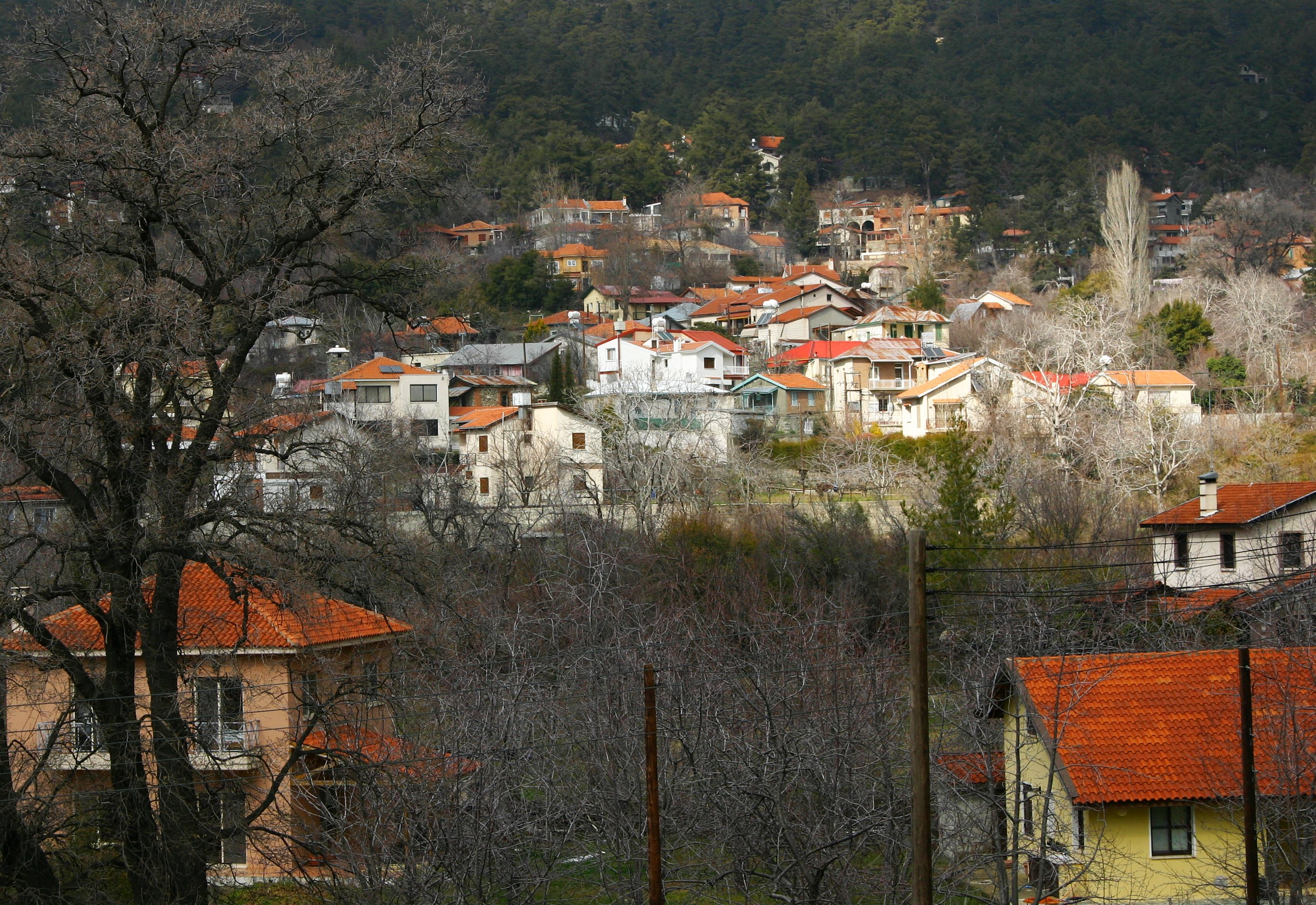
Platres, Cyprus

- Platres

==== India ====
Hundreds of hill stations are located in India. The most popular and historically accurate hill stations in India include:

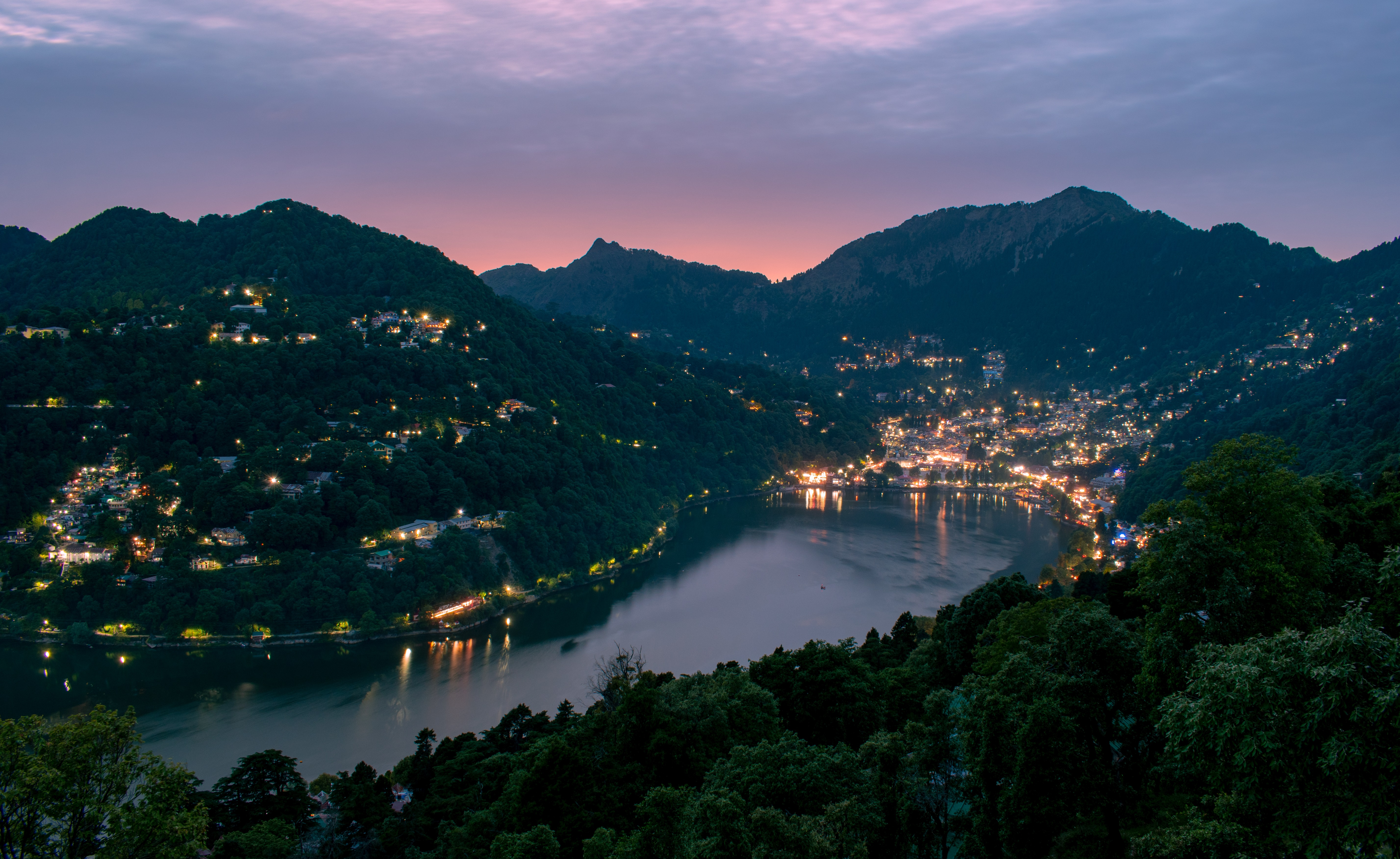
A summer evening view on the Nainital Lake and town, in the state of Uttarakhand, India. Hill stations are often created or shaped according to European aesthetics. Here, the natural lakes of the Kumaon hills echo the lakes of the Swiss Alps, celebrated at the same time in Western Europe. In Ooty and Kodaikanal, the lack of water bodies has been compensated by the creation of artificial lakes.

- Coonoor, Tamil Nadu
- Dalhousie, Himachal Pradesh
- Darjeeling, West Bengal
- Ghum, West Bengal
- Gulmarg, Jammu and Kashmir
- Haflong, Assam
- Kalimpong, West Bengal
- Khajjiar, Himachal Pradesh
- Kodaikanal, Tamil Nadu
- Khandala, Maharashtra
- Kurseong, West Bengal
- Lansdowne, Uttarakhand
- Lonavala, Maharashtra
- Mahabaleshwar, Maharashtra
- Matheran, Maharashtra
- McLeod Ganj, Himachal Pradesh
- Mount Abu, Rajasthan
- Mussoorie, Uttarakhand
- Nainital, Uttarakhand
- Ootacamund, Tamil Nadu
- Pachmarhi, Madhya Pradesh
- Saputara, Gujarat
- Shillong, Meghalaya
- Shimla, Himachal Pradesh
- Wilson Hills, Gujarat
- Yercaud, Tamil Nadu

==== Indonesia ====
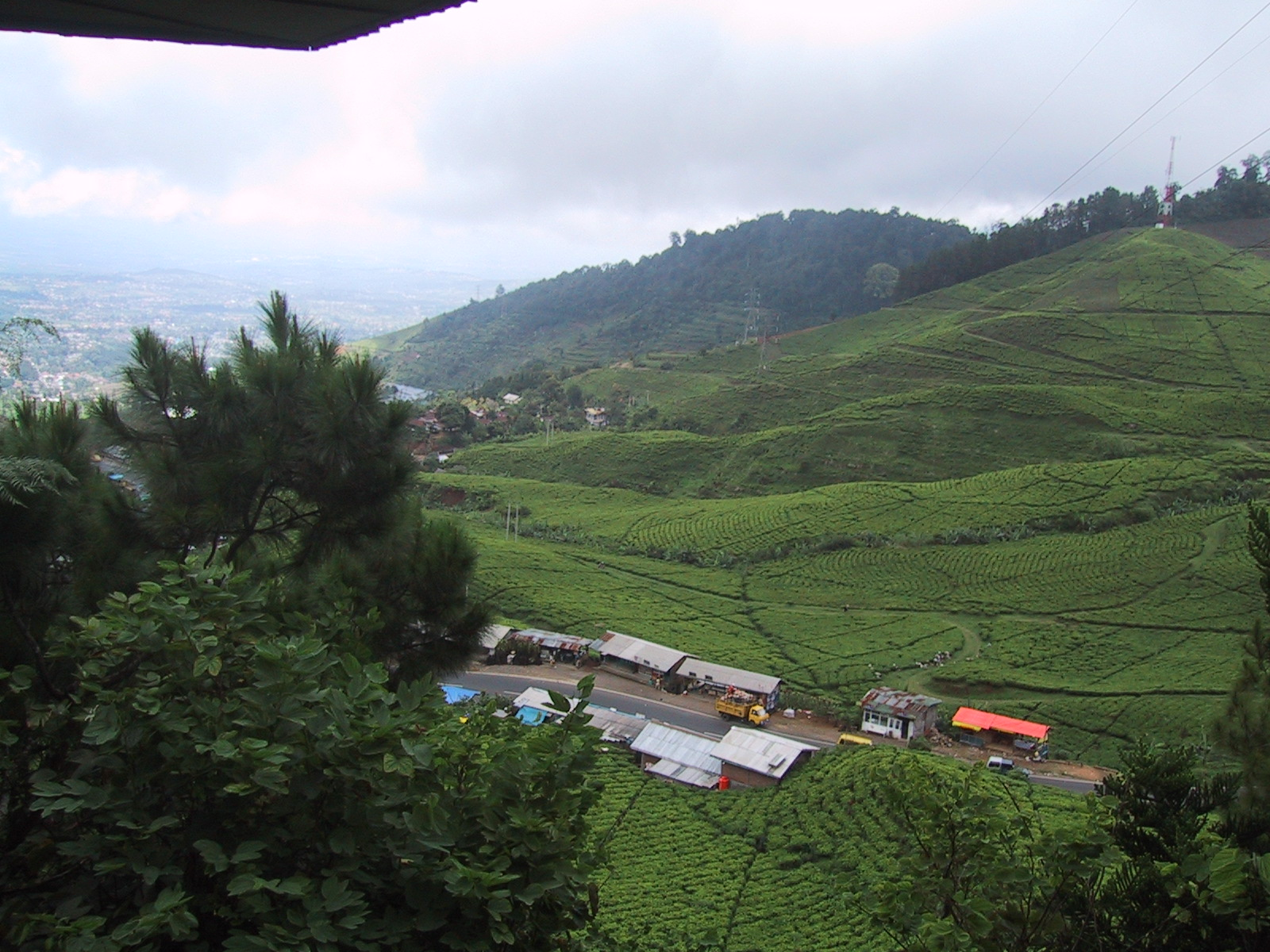
Puncak, West Java, Indonesia

- Garut in, West Java
- Sukabumi in West Java
- Puncak in West Java
- Batu in East Java
- Tretes in East Java
- Kaliurang in Yogyakarta
- Munduk in Bali
- Bedugul in Bali
- Berastagi in North Sumatra
- Kuningan in West Java
- Lembang in West Java
- Baturaden in Central Java
- Wonosobo in Central Java
- Tawangmangu in Central Java
- Bandungan, Semarang in Central Java
- Ciater in West Java
- Ciwidey in West Java
- Bukittinggi in West Sumatra
- Padang Panjang in West Sumatra
- Sawahlunto in West Sumatra
- Solok in West Sumatra
- Payakumbuh in West Sumatra
- Takengon in Aceh
- Tomohon in North Sulawesi
- Tana Toraja in South Sulawesi
- Malino in South Sulawesi
- Pangalengan in West Java
- Salatiga in Central Java

==== Iraq ====
All of these hill stations and towns are located in the Kurdistan Region of Iraq, which is a mostly mountainous and rugged region of the country.

- Shaqlawa
- Amedi
- Rawanduz
- Batifa

==== Israel ====
- Metula
- Safed

==== Japan ====
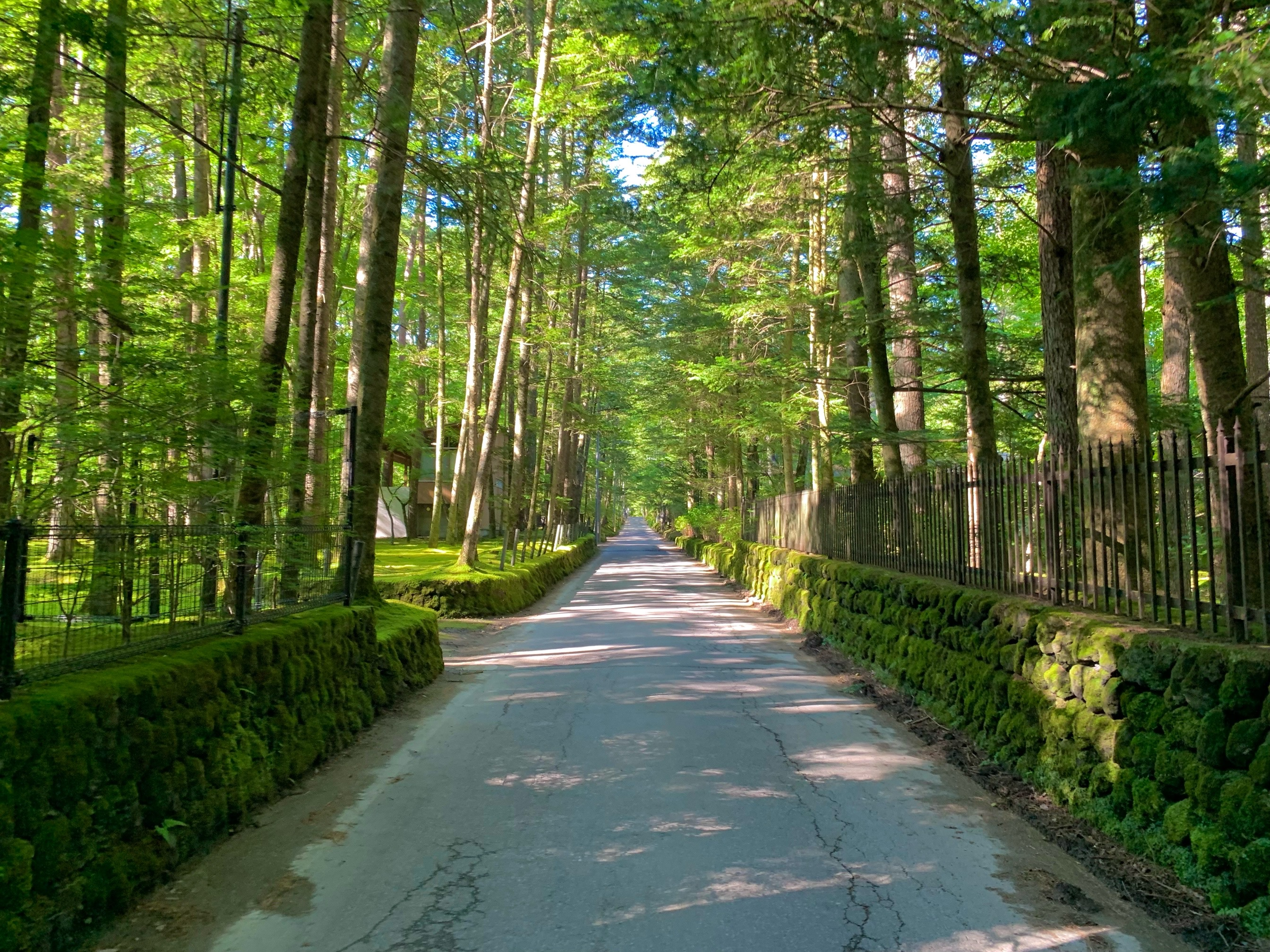
Karuizawa in Nagano, Japan

- Hakone
- Karuizawa
- Nikkō
- Lake Chūzenji

==== Jordan ====
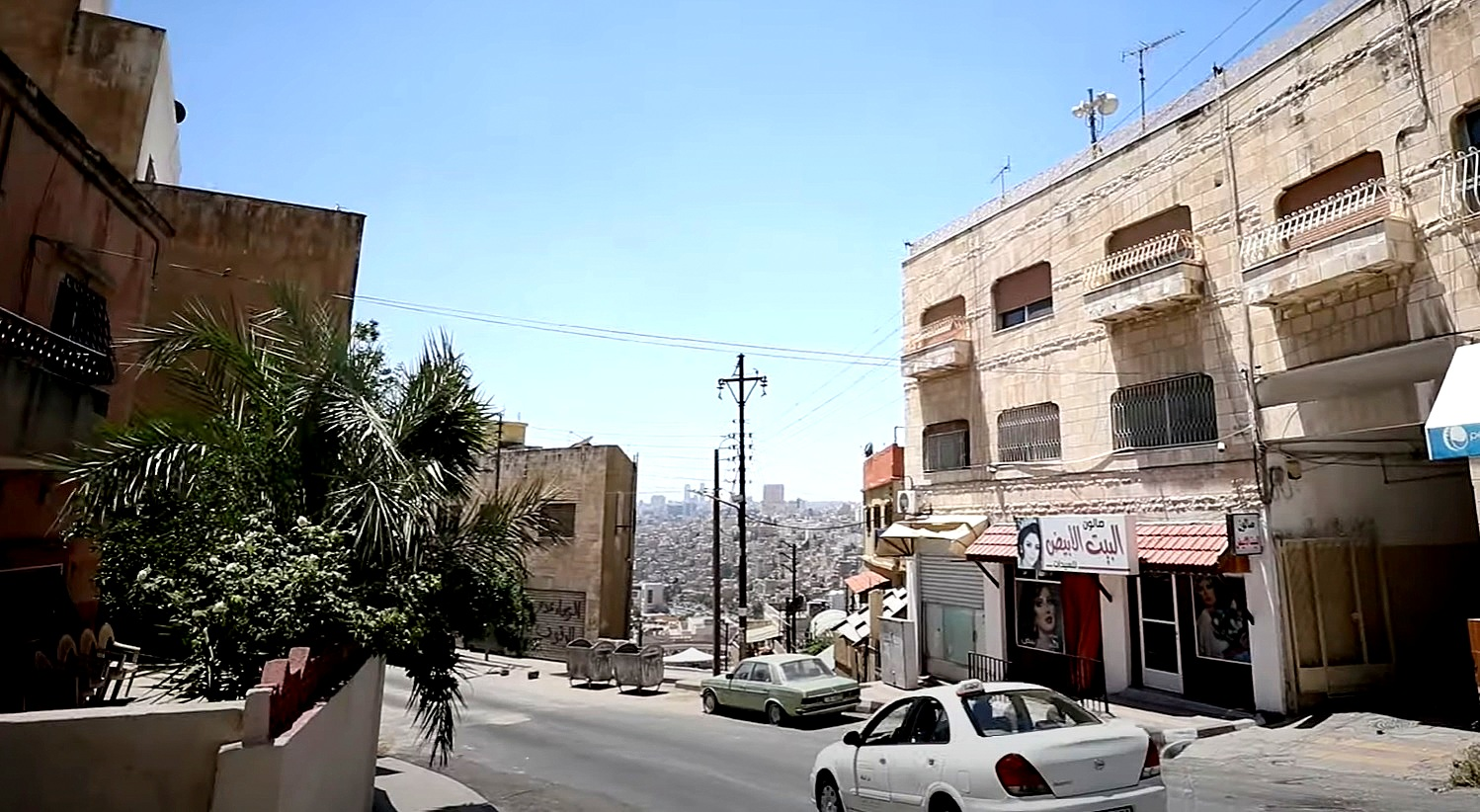
Jabal al-Ashrafiyeh in Amman, Jordan

- A few suburbs in Amman:
  - Al-Ashrafiya
  - Jabal Amman

==== Malaysia ====
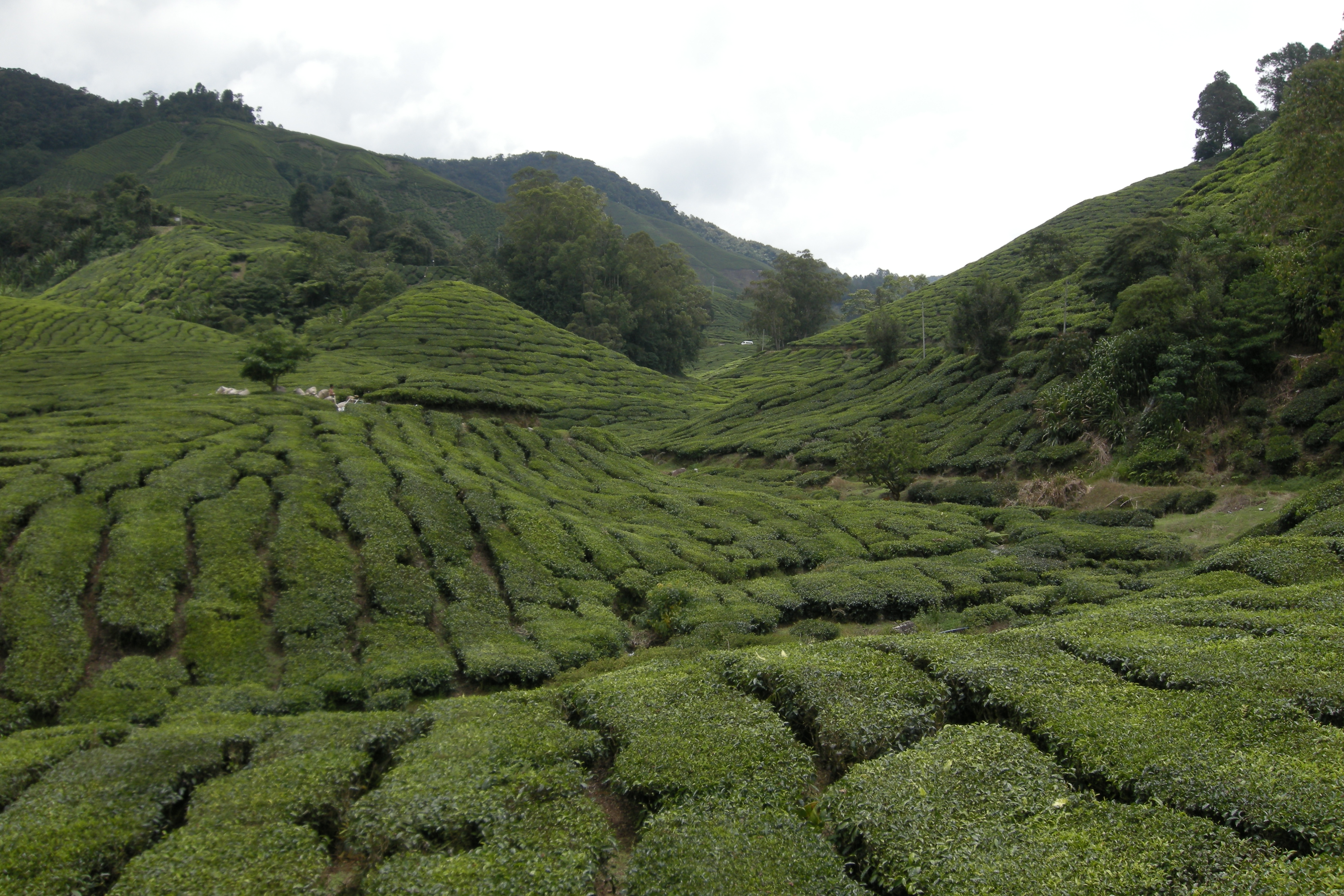
Cameron Highlands, Malaysia

- Bukit Larut
- Bukit Tinggi
- Cameron Highlands
- Fraser's Hill
- Kundasang
- Penang Hill

==== Myanmar ====
- Kalaw
- Pyin Oo Lwin

==== Nepal ====
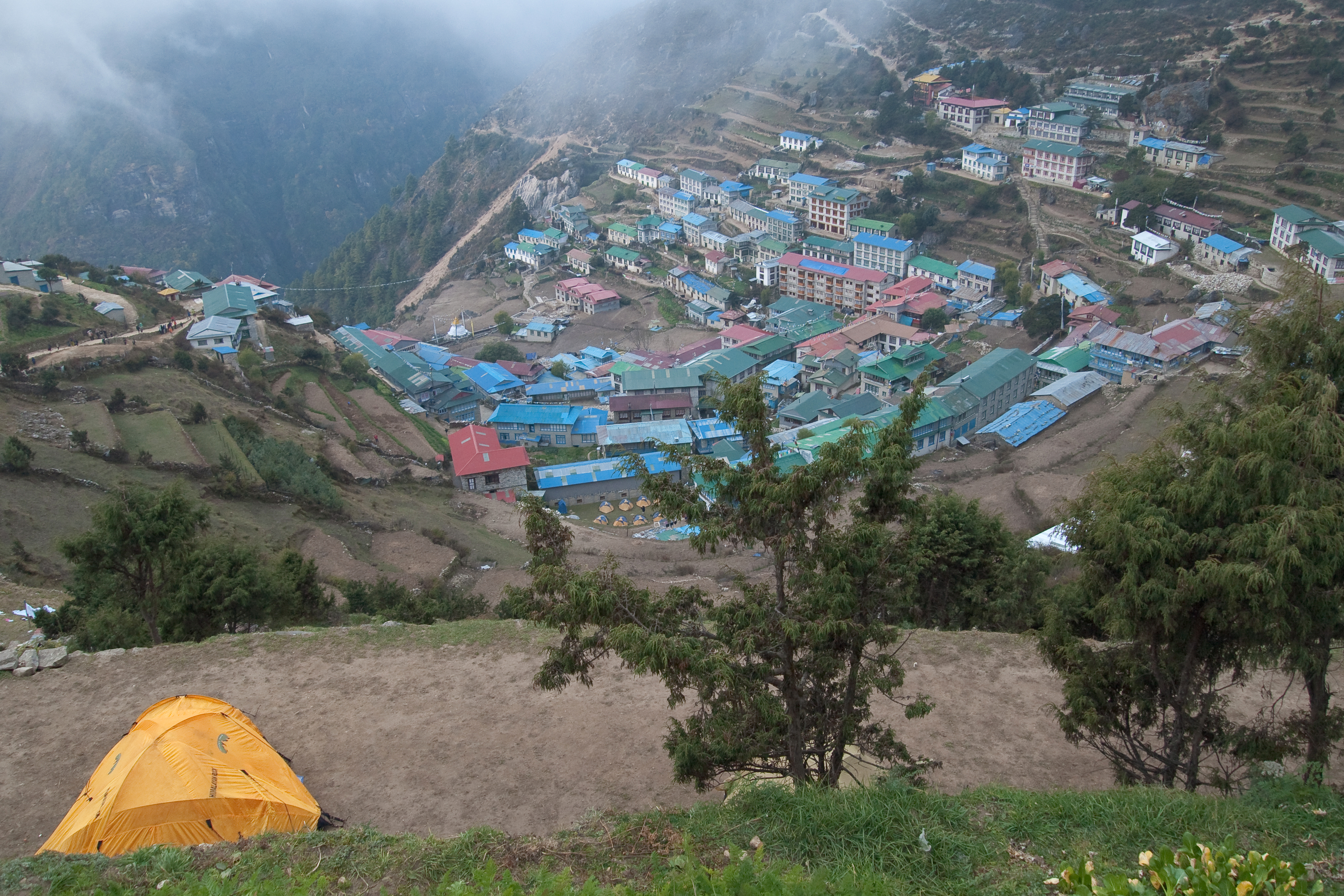
Village of Namche Bazaar in Nepal

- Pokhara
- Namche Bazaar
- Bandipur
- Dhulikhel
- Tansen
- Nagarkot
- Kakani
- Gorkha Bazaar
- Daman
- Dharan
- Dhankuta
- Illam
- Sarangkot
- Baglung
- Resunga
- Kunde
- Khumjung
- Lukla
- Tengboche
- Phortse
- Bhimeshwar
- Besisahar
- Sandhikharka
- Tamghas
- Jomsom
- Phidim
- Phungling
- Fikal
- Bhedetar
- Dunai, Nepal

==== Pakistan ====
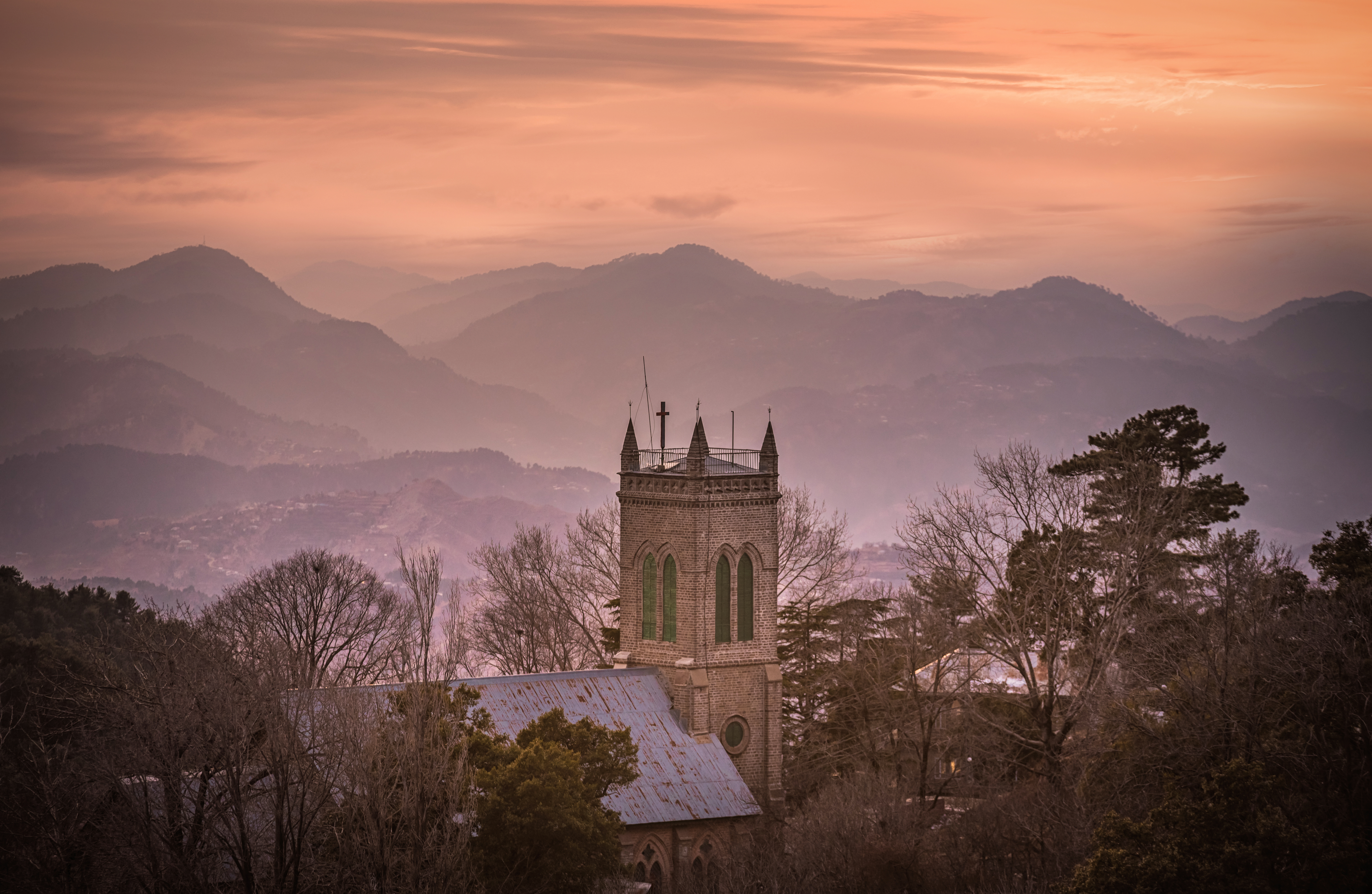
Murree, a popular hill station in Pakistan

Khyber Pakhtunkhwa

- Abbottabad
- Behrain
- Kalam Valley
- Malam Jabba
- Nathia Gali
- Shogran
- Chitral
- Jahaz Banda
- Naran
- Kaghan

Punjab

- Bhurban
- Charra Pani
- Murree
- Patriata

Sindh

- Gorakh Hill
- Bado Hill Station

Balochistan

- Ziarat

Gilgit Baltistan

- Hunza Valley
- Skardu
- Astore Valley
- Gilgit
- Nagar Valley

==== Philippines ====
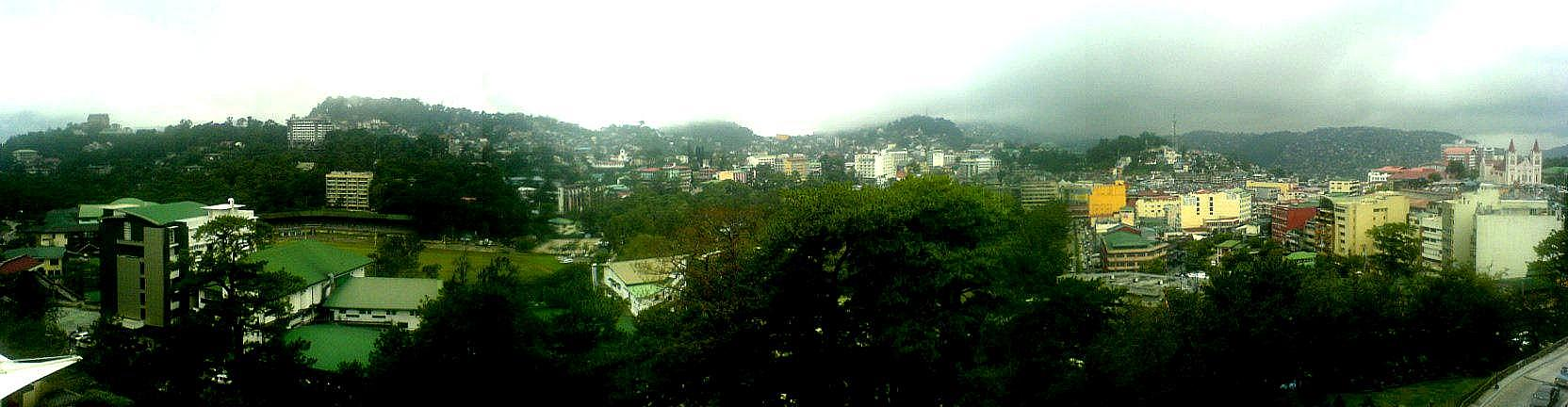
Baguio, Philippines

- Baguio
- Malaybalay
- Mambukal
- Sagada
- Salvador Benedicto
- Tagaytay

==== Sri Lanka ====
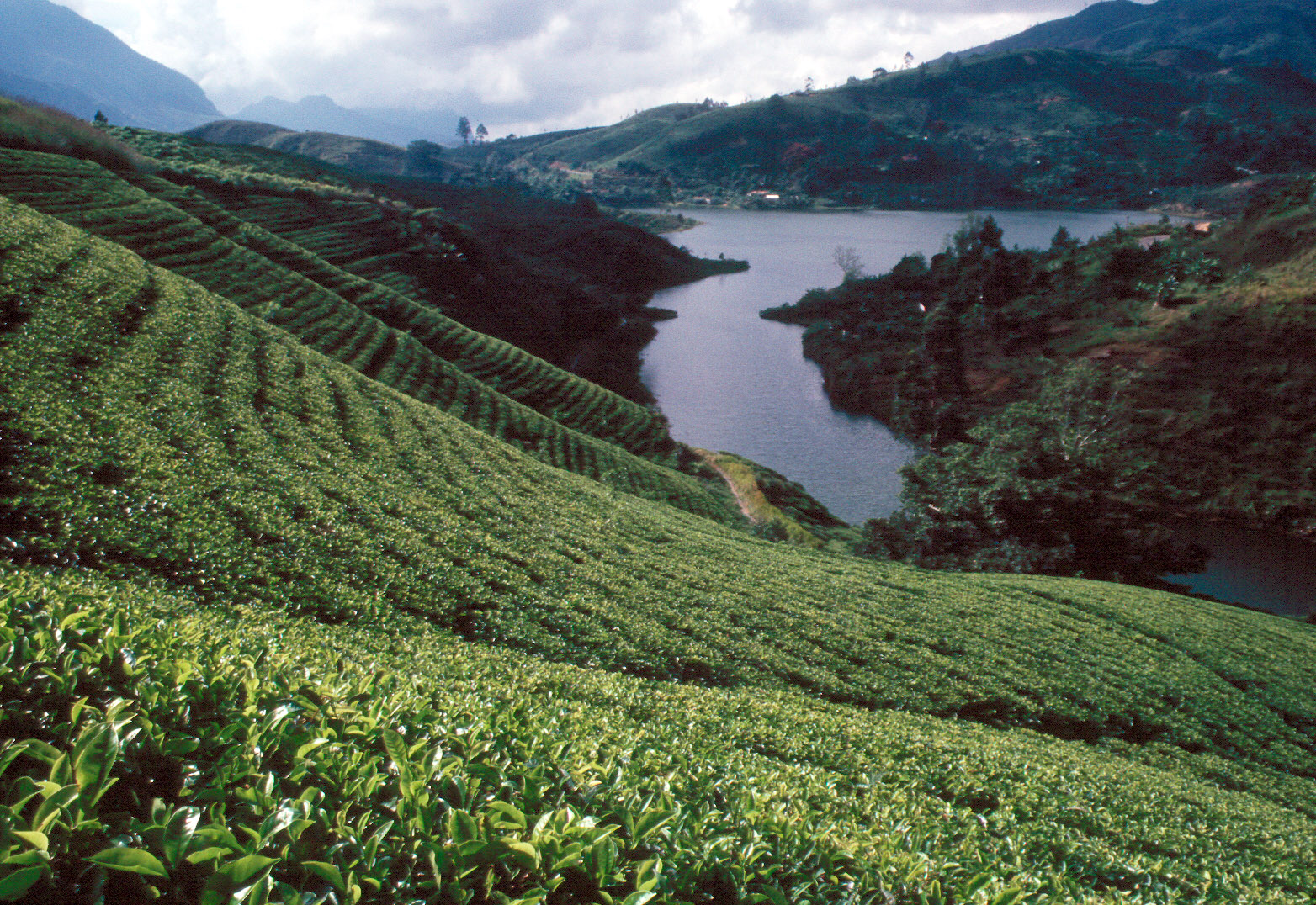
Nuwara Eliya, Sri Lanka

- Nuwara Eliya

==== Syria ====
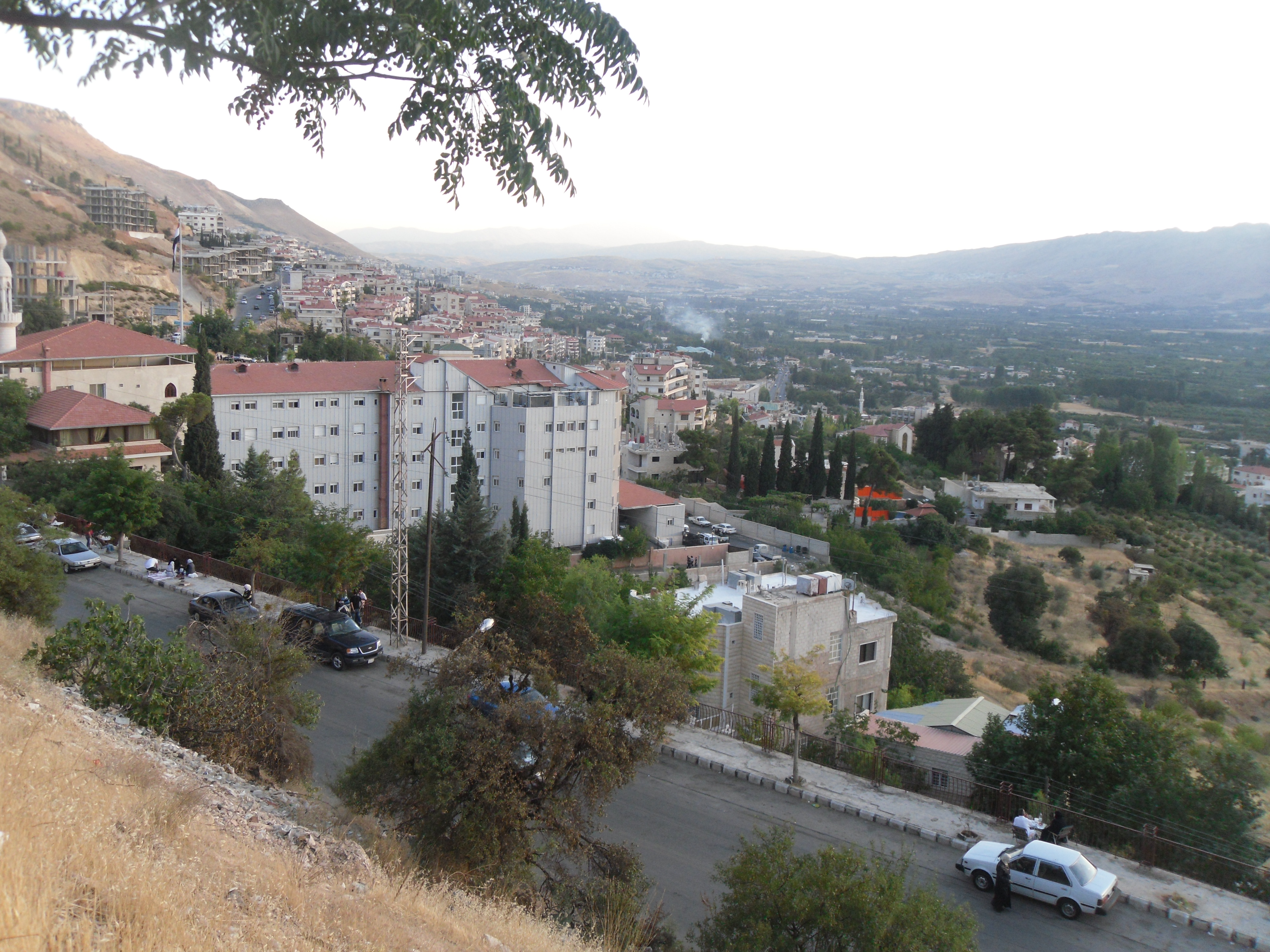
Bloudan, Syria

- Bloudan
- Masyaf
- Qadmous
- Zabadani
- Madaya

==== Uzbekistan ====
- Chimgan

==== Vietnam ====
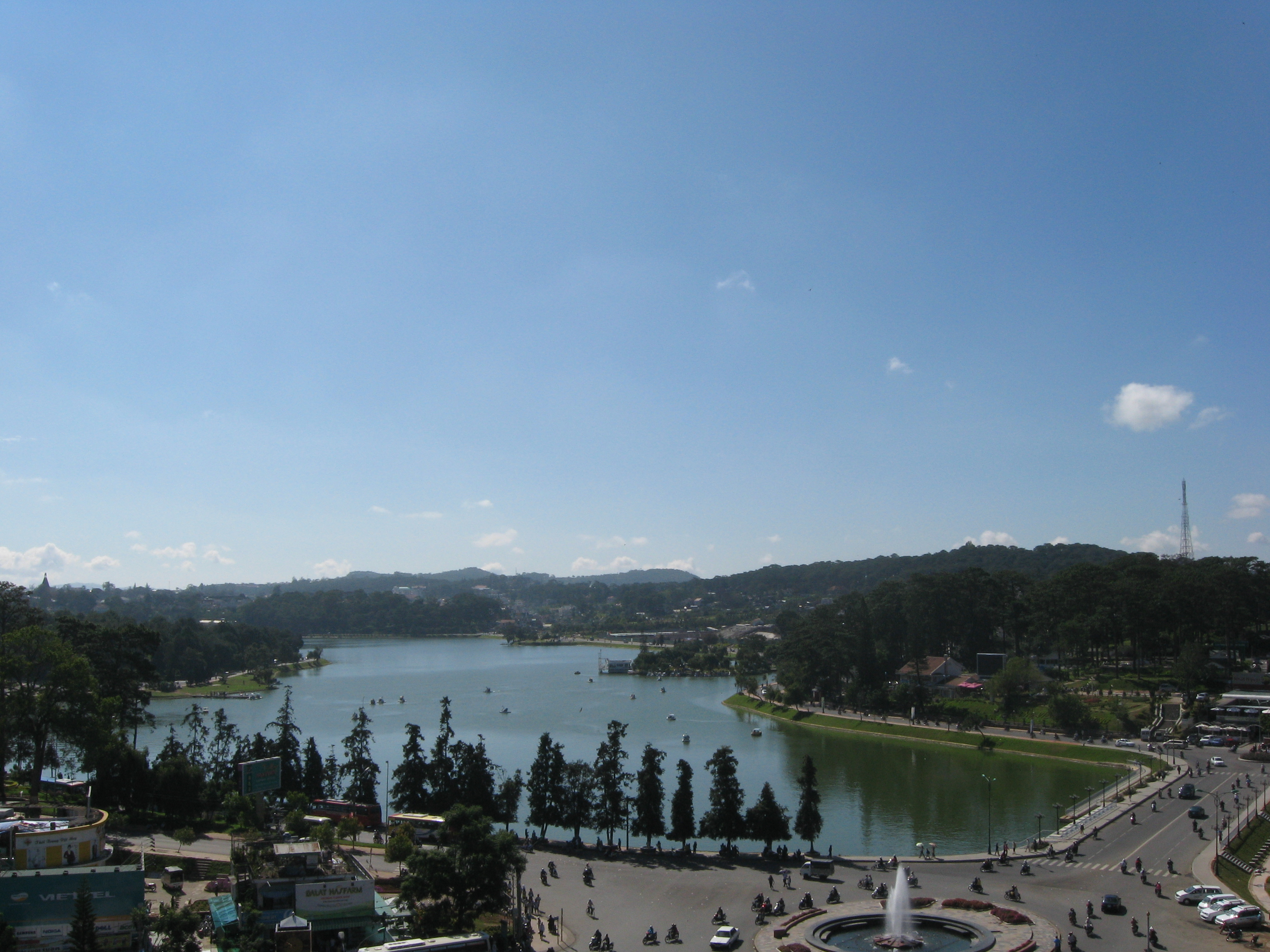
Da Lat, Vietnam

- Bà Nà Hills
- Bạch Mã National Park
- Da Lat
- Măng Đen
- Sa Pa
- Tam Đảo

=== Oceania ===
==== Australia ====
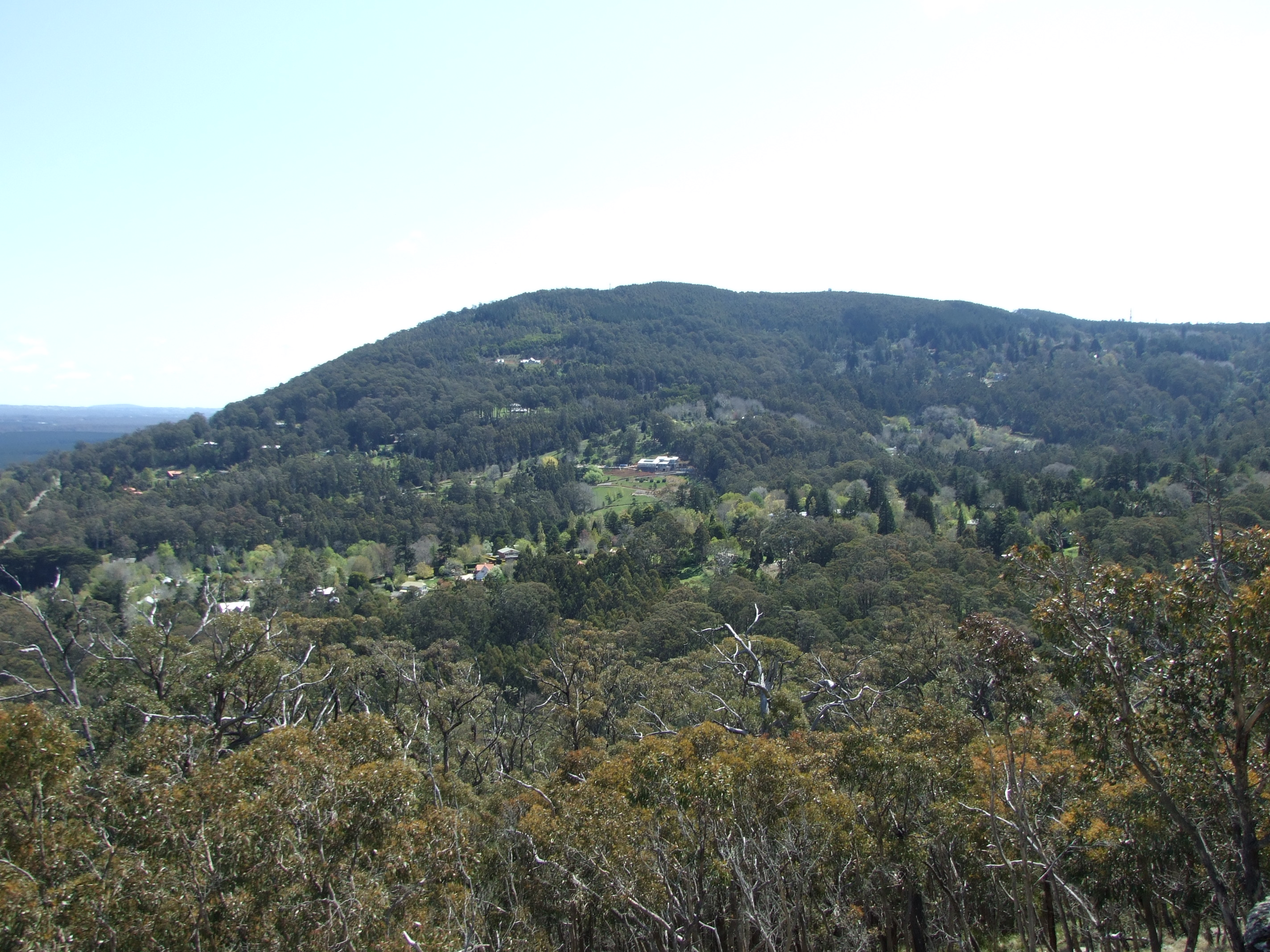
Mount Macedon, Victoria

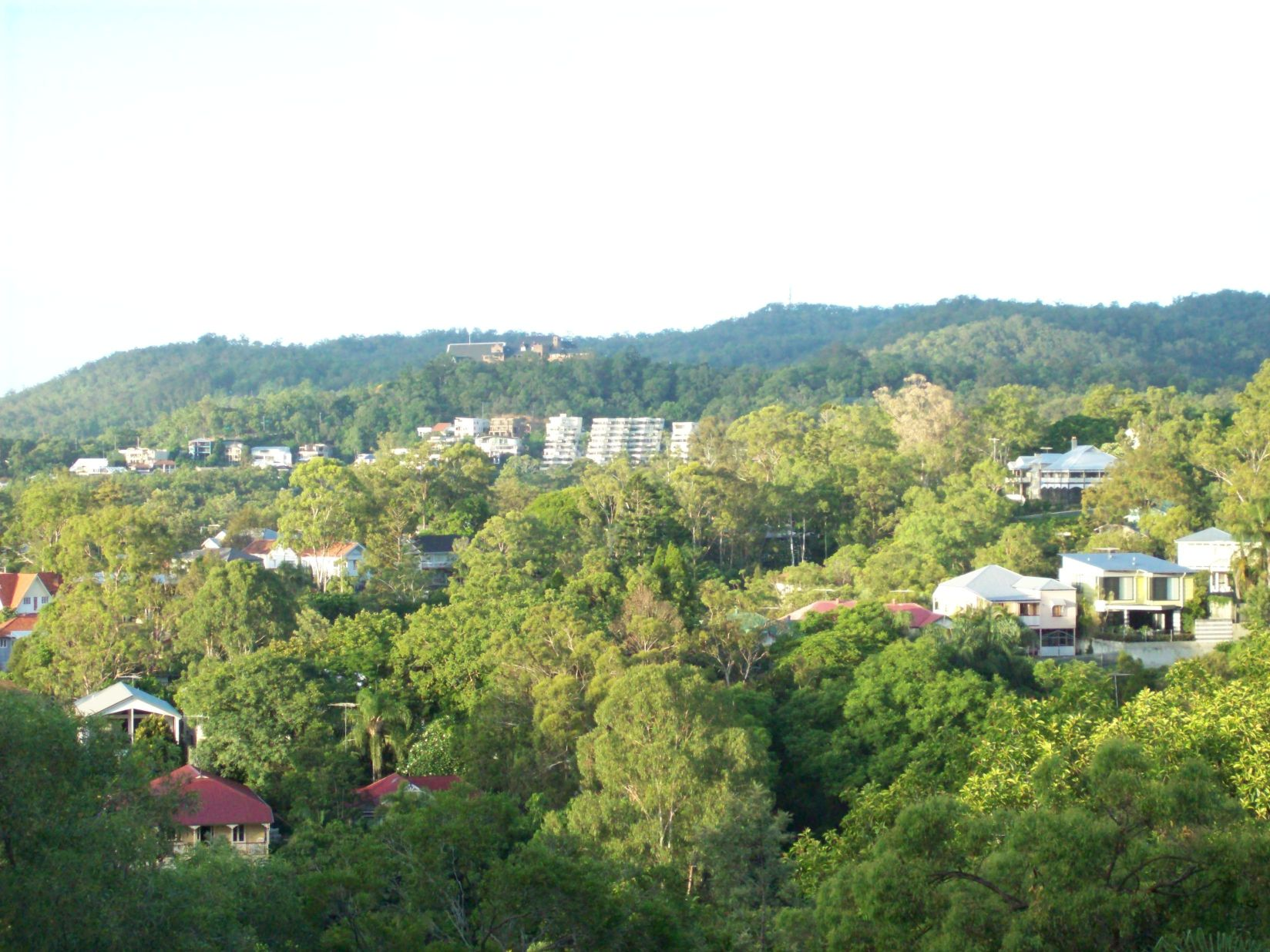
Bardon, Queensland

===== Victoria =====
- Mount Macedon
- Harrietville

===== South Australia =====
- Mount Gambier
- Adelaide Hills

===== Queensland =====
- Toowoomba
- The Gap
- Chapel Hill
- Bardon
- Ferny Grove
- Buderim
- New Auckland
- Mount Archer

===== Western Australia =====
- Lesmurdie
- Kalamunda
- Jarrahdale
- Bedfordale

===== New South Wales =====
- Blue Mountains
- Mount Pleasant
- Woonoona
- Kariong
- Illawarra escarpment (Stanwell Tops)
- Prospect Hill (Pemulwuy)
- Terrey Hills
- Berowra Heights

== See also ==
- Summer capital
- Summer colony
- Tierra templada
- Tierra fría
- Plateau
- Tableland
- Mesa

== Bibliography ==
External videos
- Booknotes interview with Barbara Crossette on The Great Hill Stations of Asia, August 23, 1998, C-SPAN

- Crossette, Barbara. The Great Hill Stations of Asia. ISBN 0-465-01488-7.
- Kennedy, Dane. The Magic Mountains: Hill Stations and the British Raj. Berkeley: University of California Press, 1996. ISBN 0-520-20188-4, ISBN 978-0520201880.
