= Gorakh Hill =

Gorakh Hill Sindhi: گورکھ هل اسٽيشن Urdu: گورکھ ہل اسٹیشن
- Village
- Gorakh Hill Station
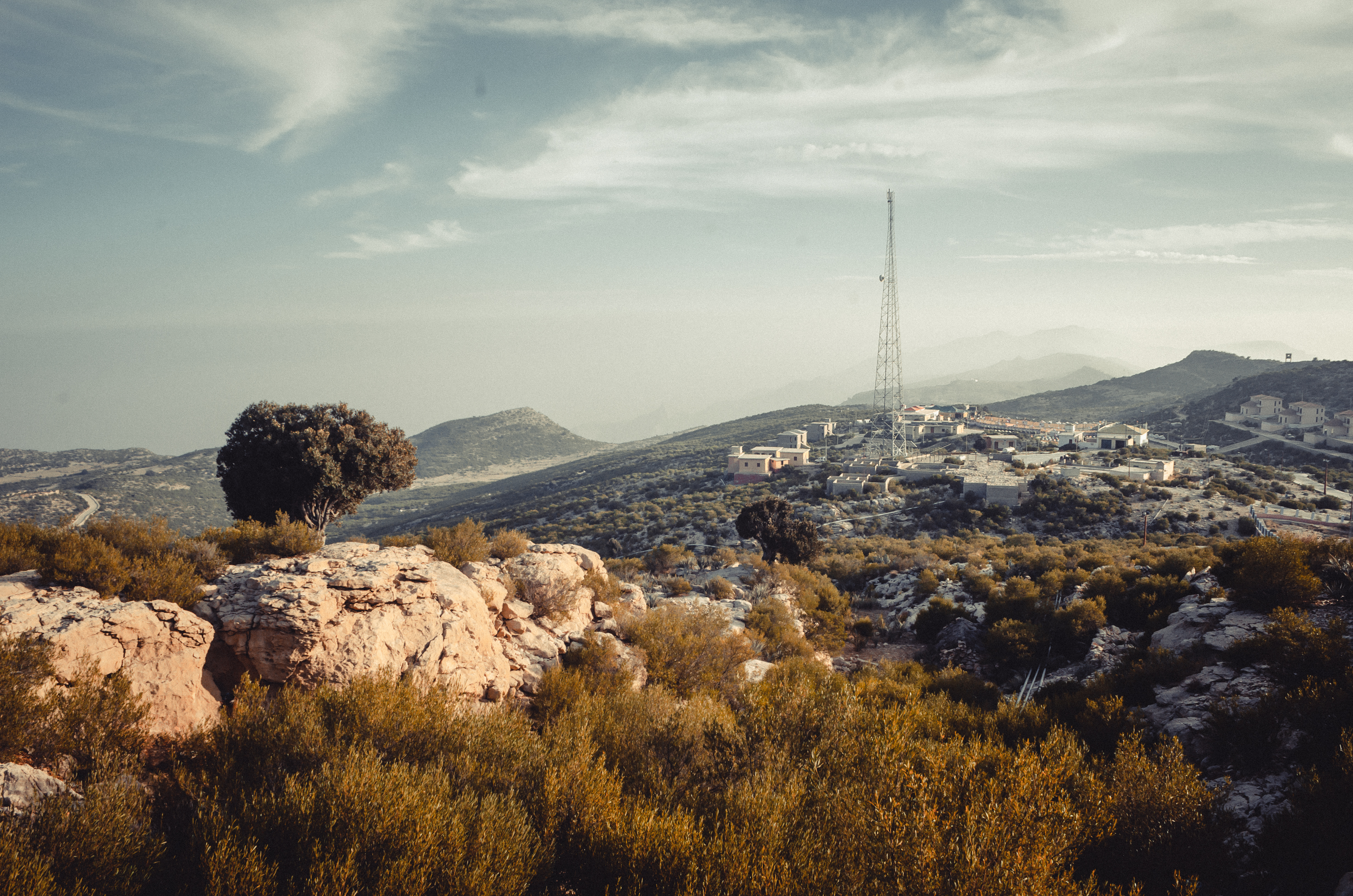
- Gorakh Hill top
- Nickname: Gorakh
- Location within Pakistan
- Coordinates: 26°52′04.8″N 67°09′07.6″E
- Country: Pakistan
- Province: Sindh
- District: Dadu
- Elevation: 1,734 m (5,689 ft)
- Time zone: UTC+5 (PST)

Gorakh Hill (Sindhi: گورک ٽڪري; Urdu: گورکھ ہل) is a hill station of Sindh, Pakistan. It is situated at an elevation of 7,684 ft (2,342 m) in the Kirthar Mountains, 94 kilometres (58 mi) northwest of Dadu city.

== Tourism ==
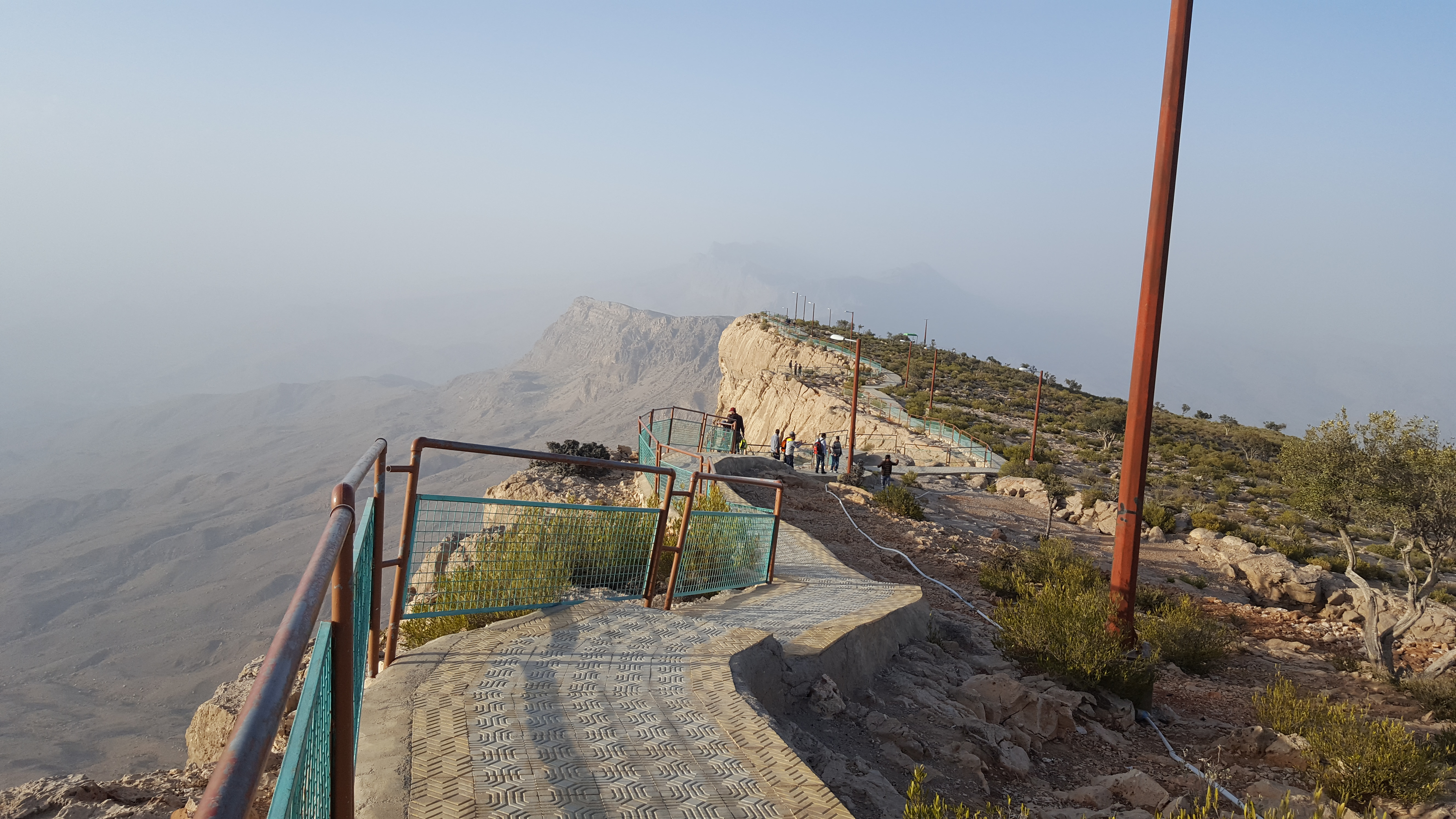
Gorakh Hill Station

The Gorakh hill station is situated 423 km (263 mi) from Karachi and nearly 8 hours' driving distance. The Hill station attracts thousands of tourists from the city.

== Etymology ==
The name Gorakh is derived from the Sindhi language in which, the word "Gorakhnath" refers to a Hindu saint associated with the deity Shiva and that Balochi-language word "Gurkh" is later dialectic adaptation of Sindhi-language word Gorakh. but there is no connection of Persian Gurg and Balochi Gurkh means wolf with word of Sindh language. It is believed that the name is derived from original word Gorakh either of Sanskrit or Sindhi language which means very difficult and intricate.

== Location. ==
Gorakh Hill Station is situated in the Kirthar Mountain Reach, in the north-western piece of Sindh, Pakistan. It sits around 95 kilometers from the closest significant city, Dadu, and around 500 kilometers from Karachi, the provincial capital. The Hill station is important for the Kirthar Public Park, a district known for its tough scene and different untamed life. Situated at a height of 5,688 feet (1,734 meters) above ocean level, Gorakh Hill stands apart as one of the greatest places in Sindh. Its geological position puts it on the line among Sindh and Balochistan, making it a one of a kind gathering point of various landscapes and environments in the locale. The region is portrayed by its rough territory, steep slants, and a somewhat cooler environment contrasted with the swamps of Sindh.

== History ==
Different opinions have been given about the history and origin of the hill station. It is said that the medieval Hindu saint, Gorakhnath, had extensively wandered in hills and the region. According to Nandu, an authority on Sanskrit, Gorakh is a Sanskrit word which means "shepherding of sheep, cow and goat, etc."

The Gorakh Hill has been important centre of Hindu pilgrimage due to sanctification by Guru Gorakhnath, a saint who is said to have established a temple of Lord Shiva here.

== Geography ==
Gorakh Hill Station is situated on one of the highest plateaus of Sindh, spread over 1,000 hectares (2,500 acres) of land. The area is part of the Kirthar Mountain Range that makes the border between Sindh and Baluchistan provinces in Pakistan.

== Nightlife ==
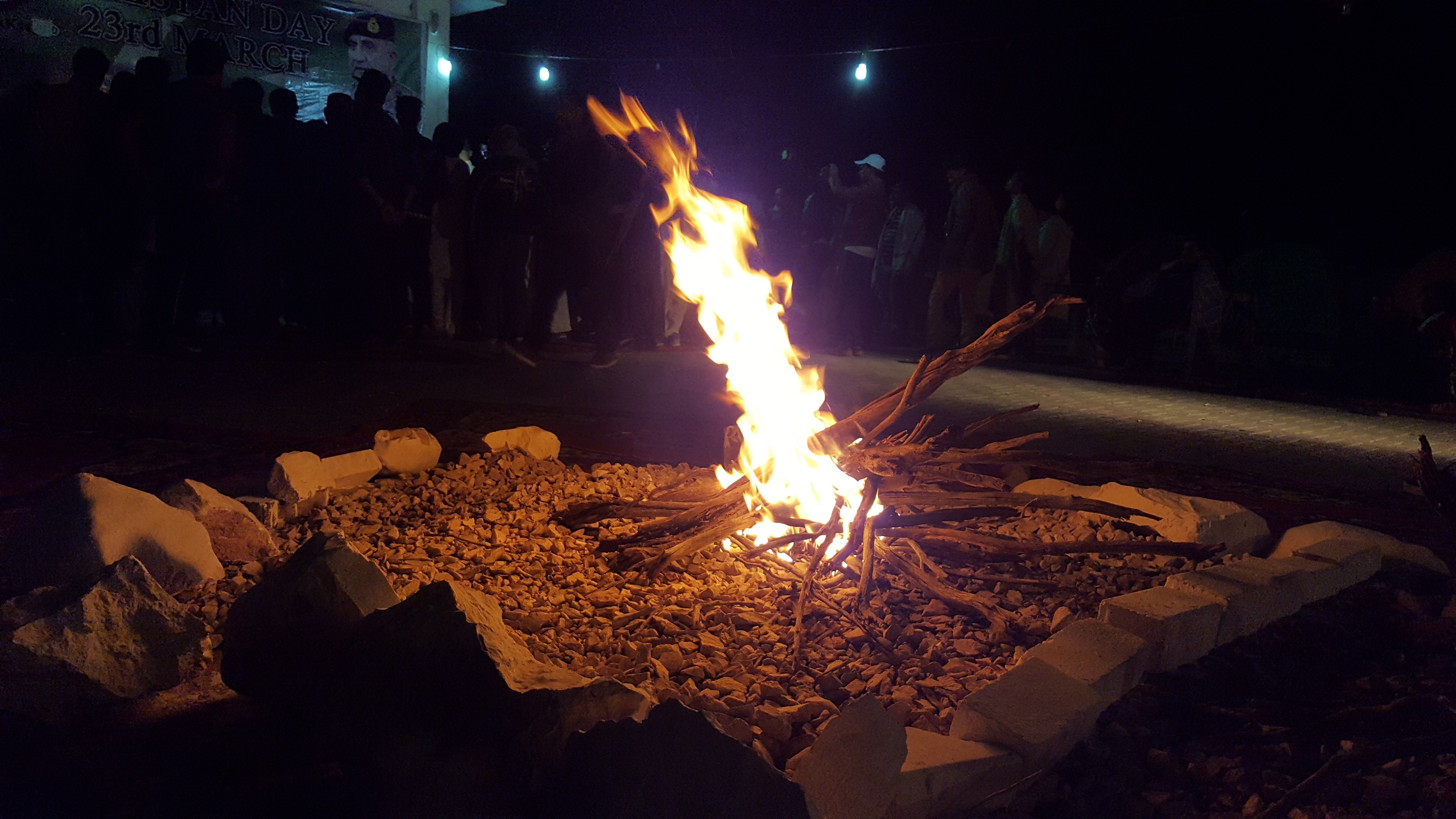
Bonfire at Gorakh Hill Station (Nightlife)

Gorakh Hill Station is known for its nightlife, specially Bonfire setup.

== Climate ==
Gorakh's elevation gives it a special climate, with sub-zero temperatures during winter and generally below 20 °C (68 °F) in summer, with about 300 mm of average annual rainfall. The Government of Sindh is in the process of constructing a new road from Dadu to Gorakh Hill. There is a new rest house for visitors on the hill. Tourists can arrange their own transport from Sehwan Sharif to the hill station.

== Gallery ==
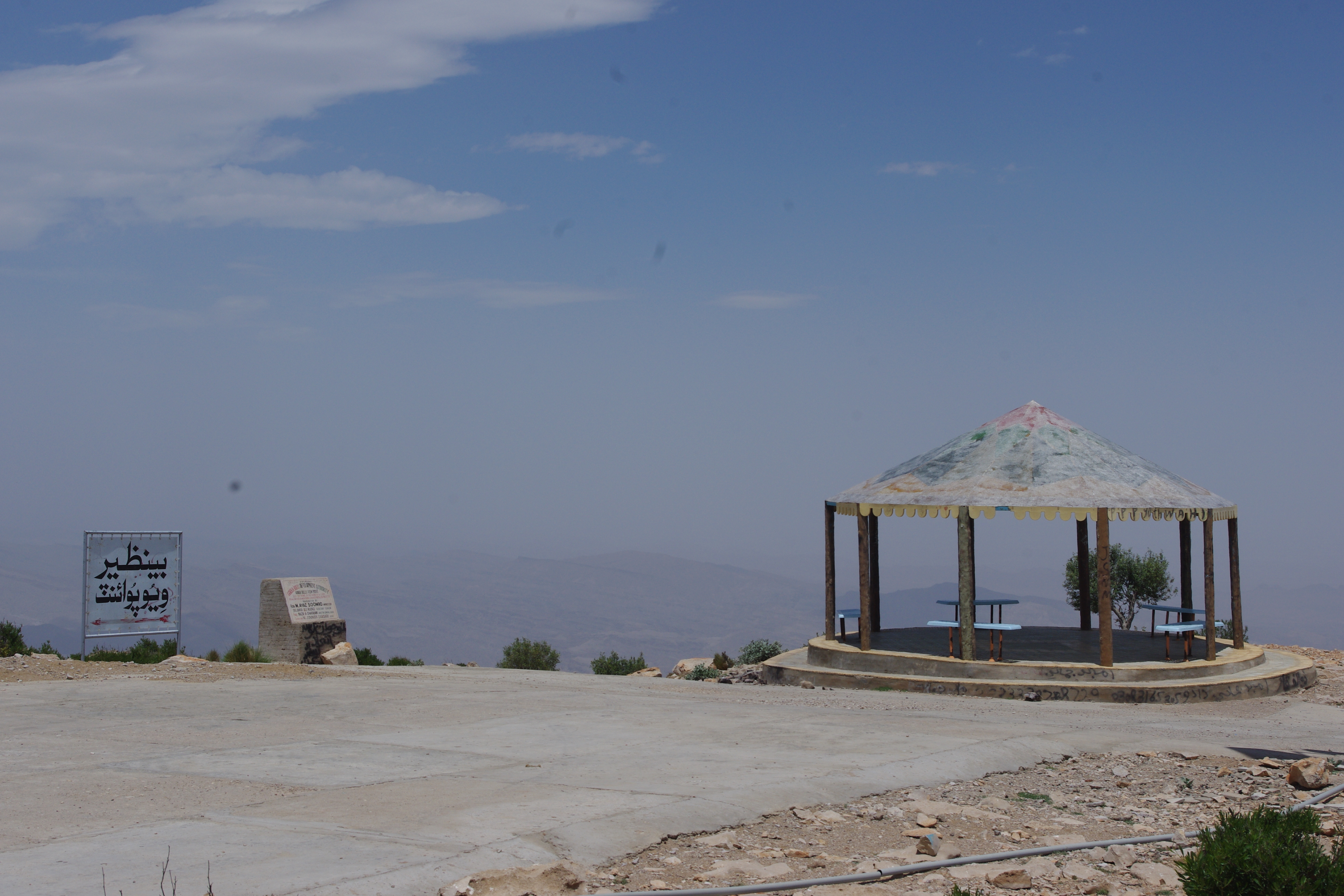
Gorakh Hill Station pavillon

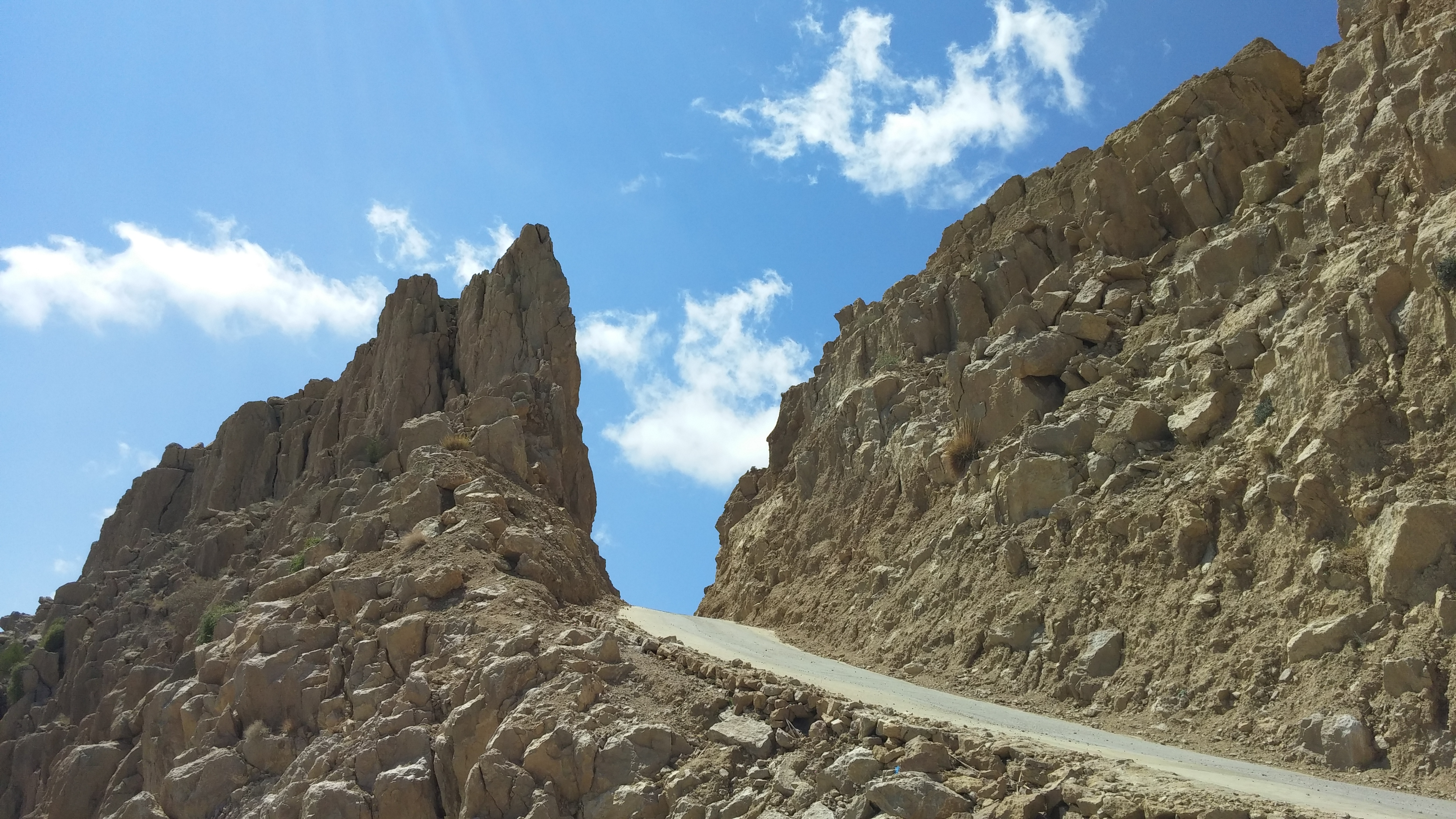
Road To Gorakh Hill

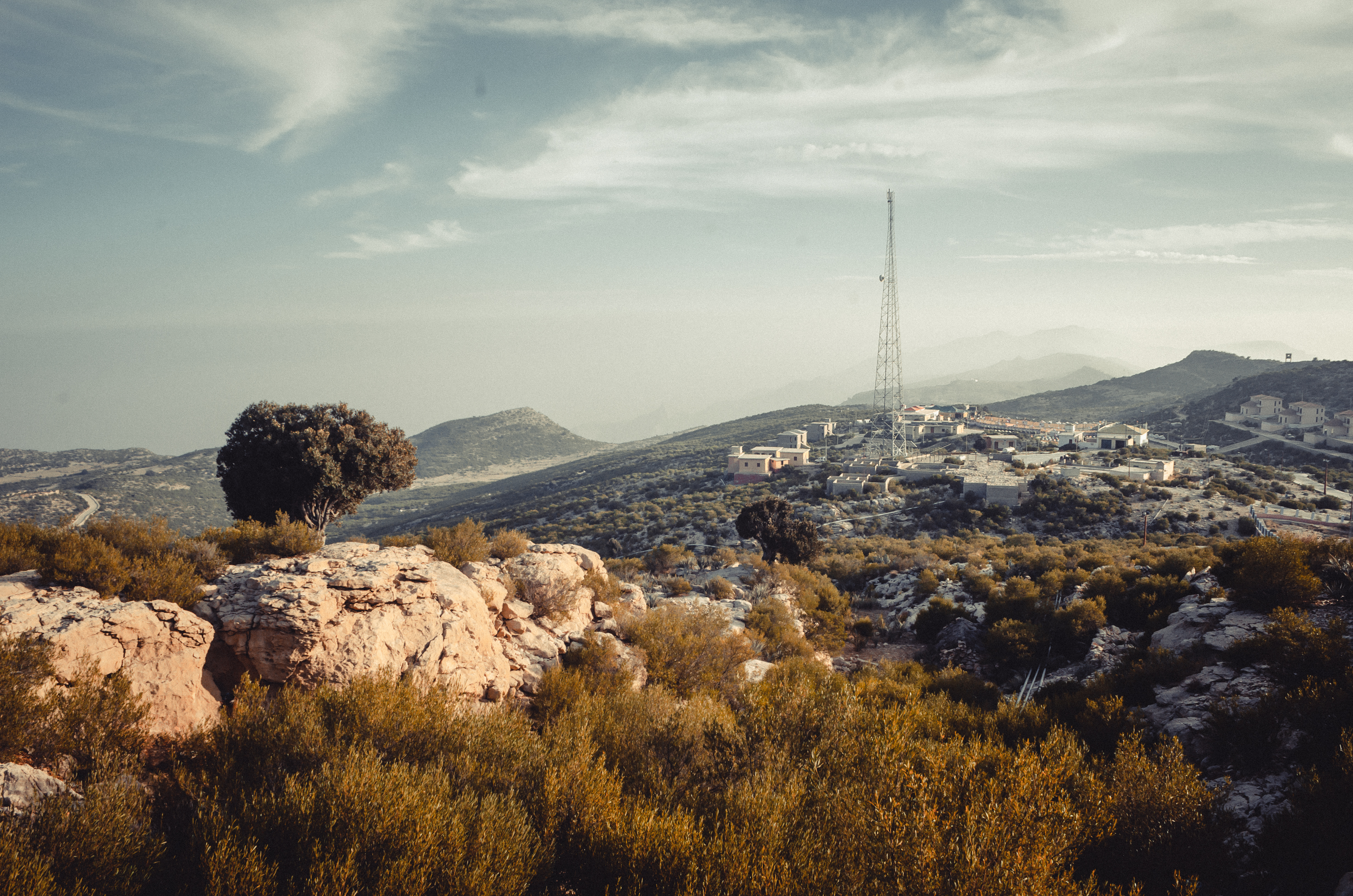
Gorakh Hill Station

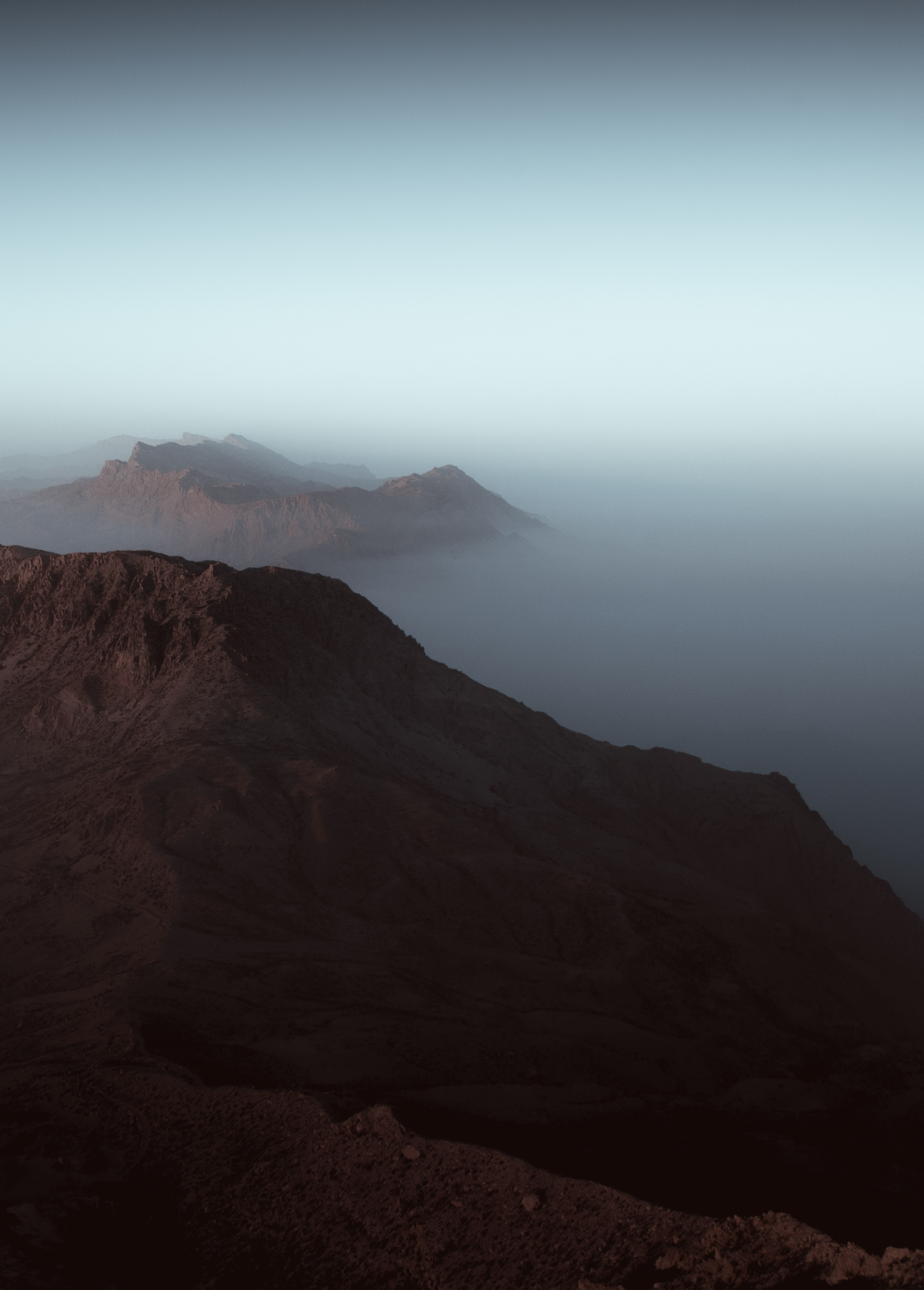
Sunrise in Gorakh

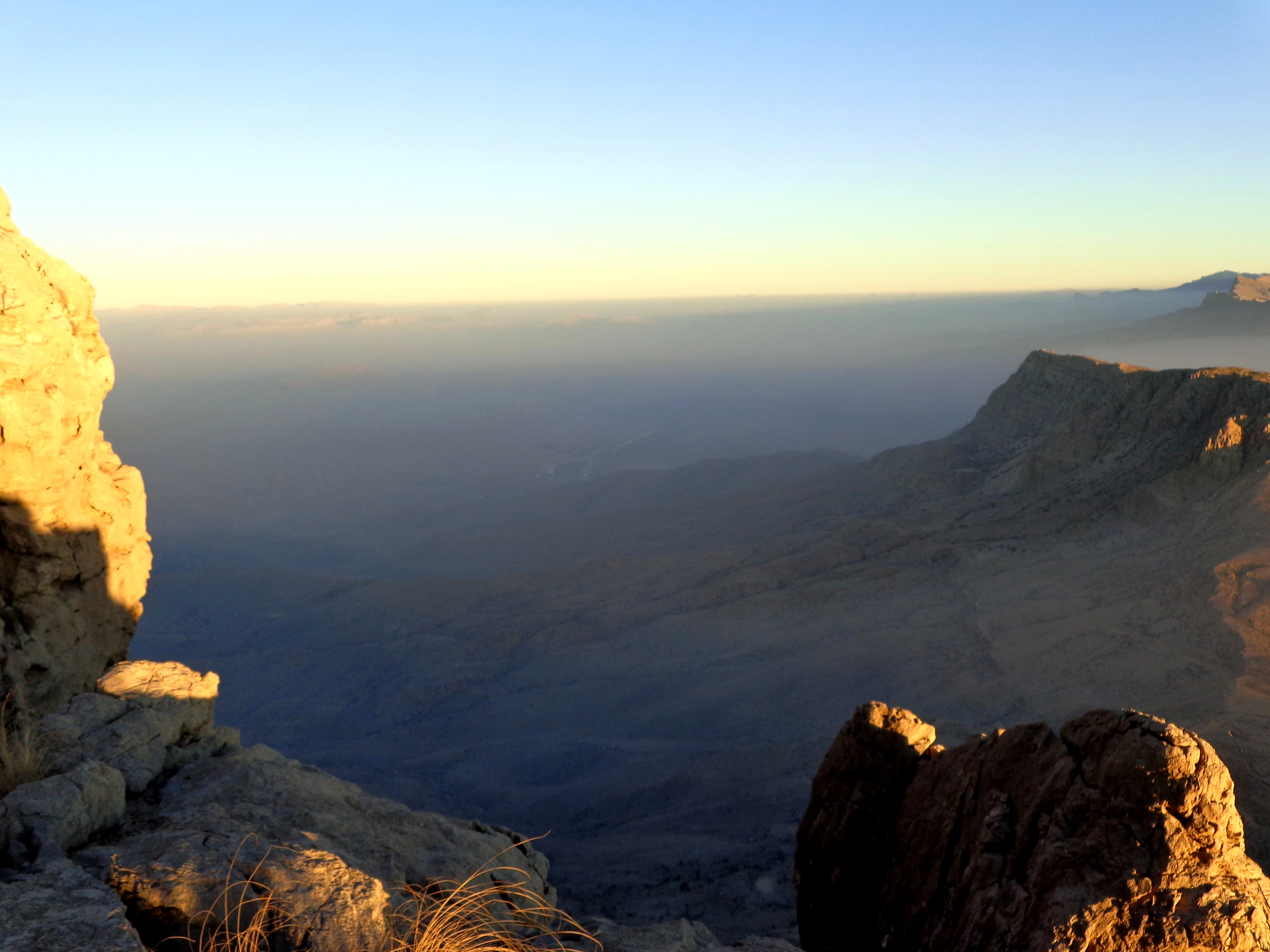
View from Gorakh hills

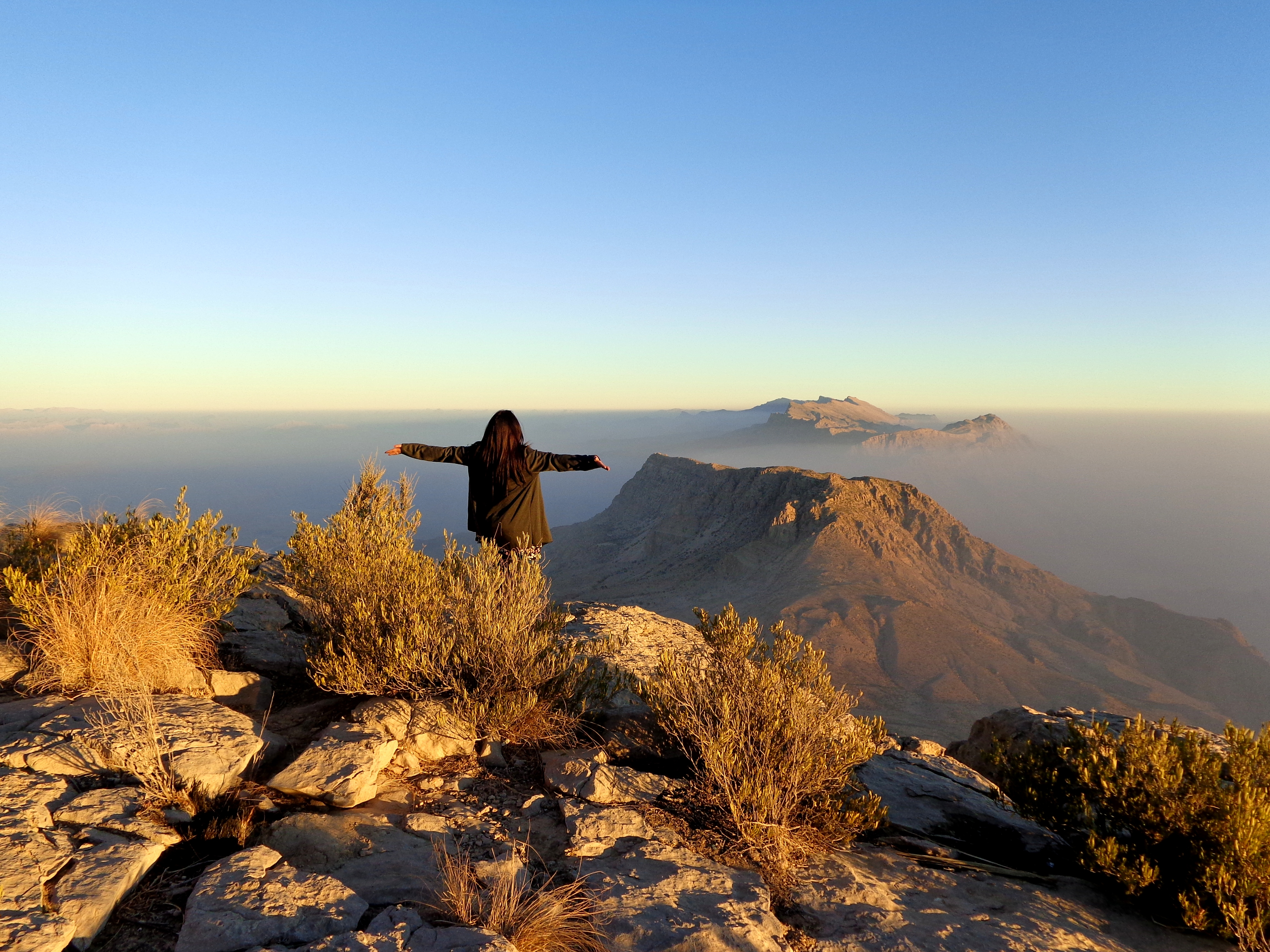

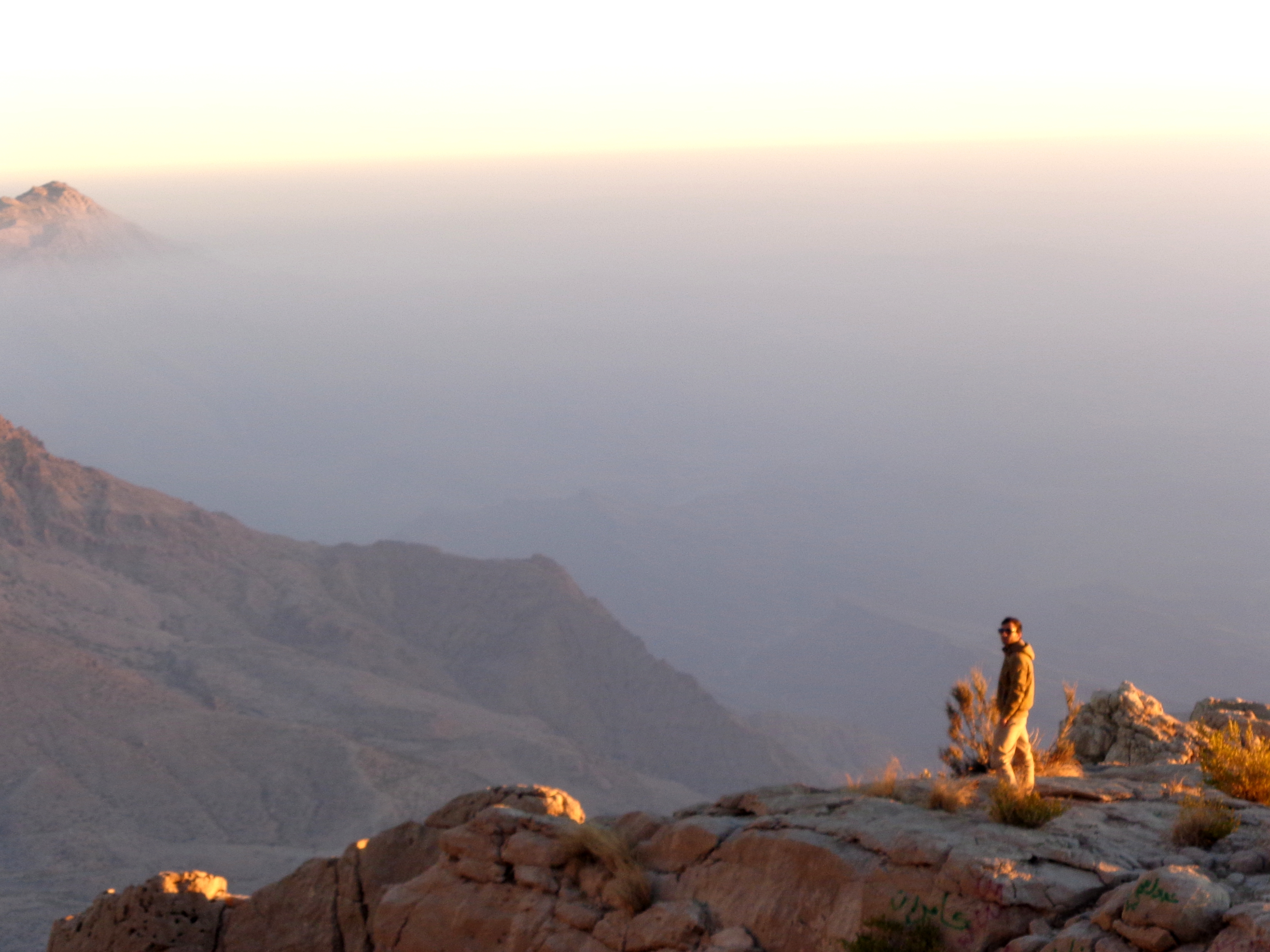

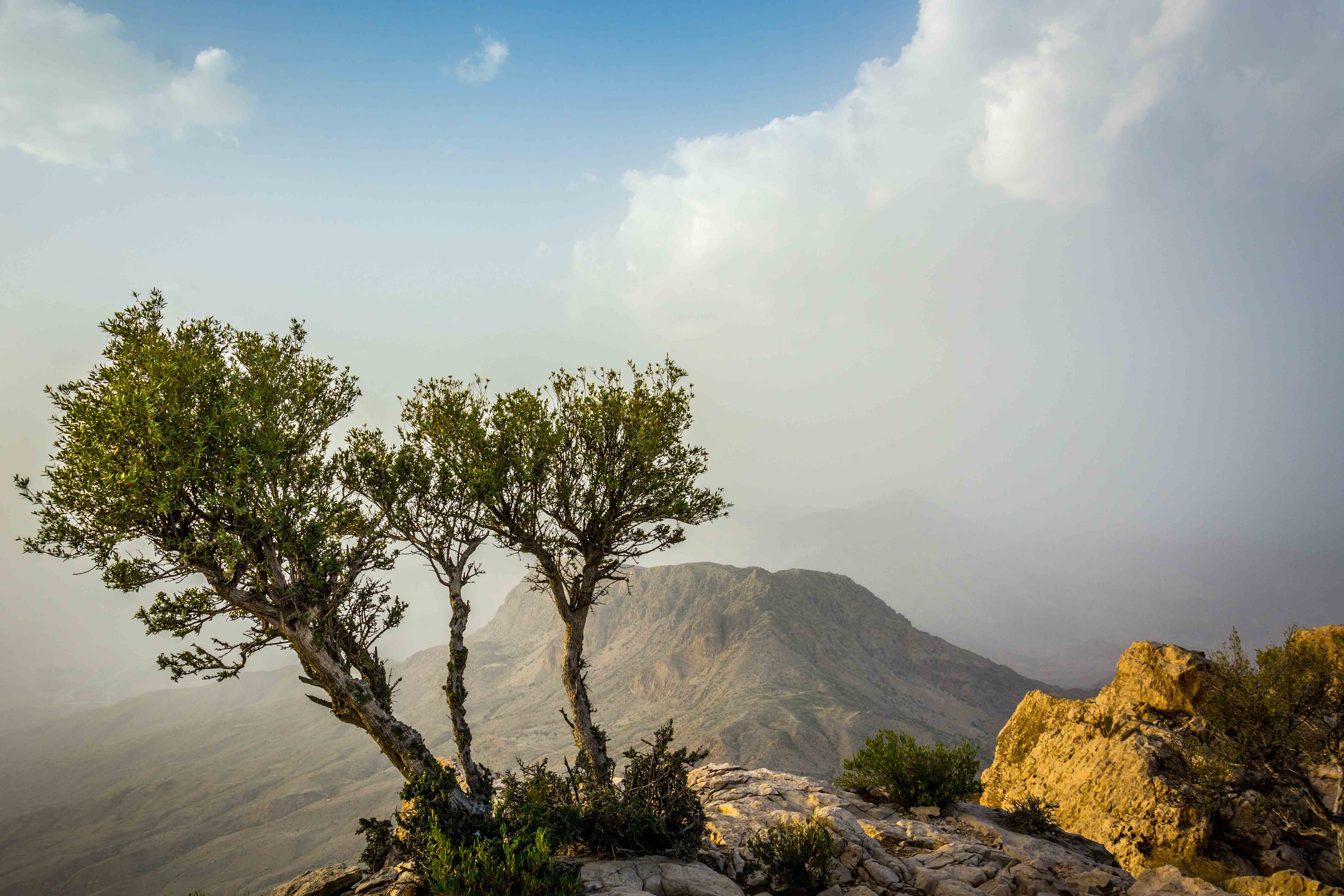

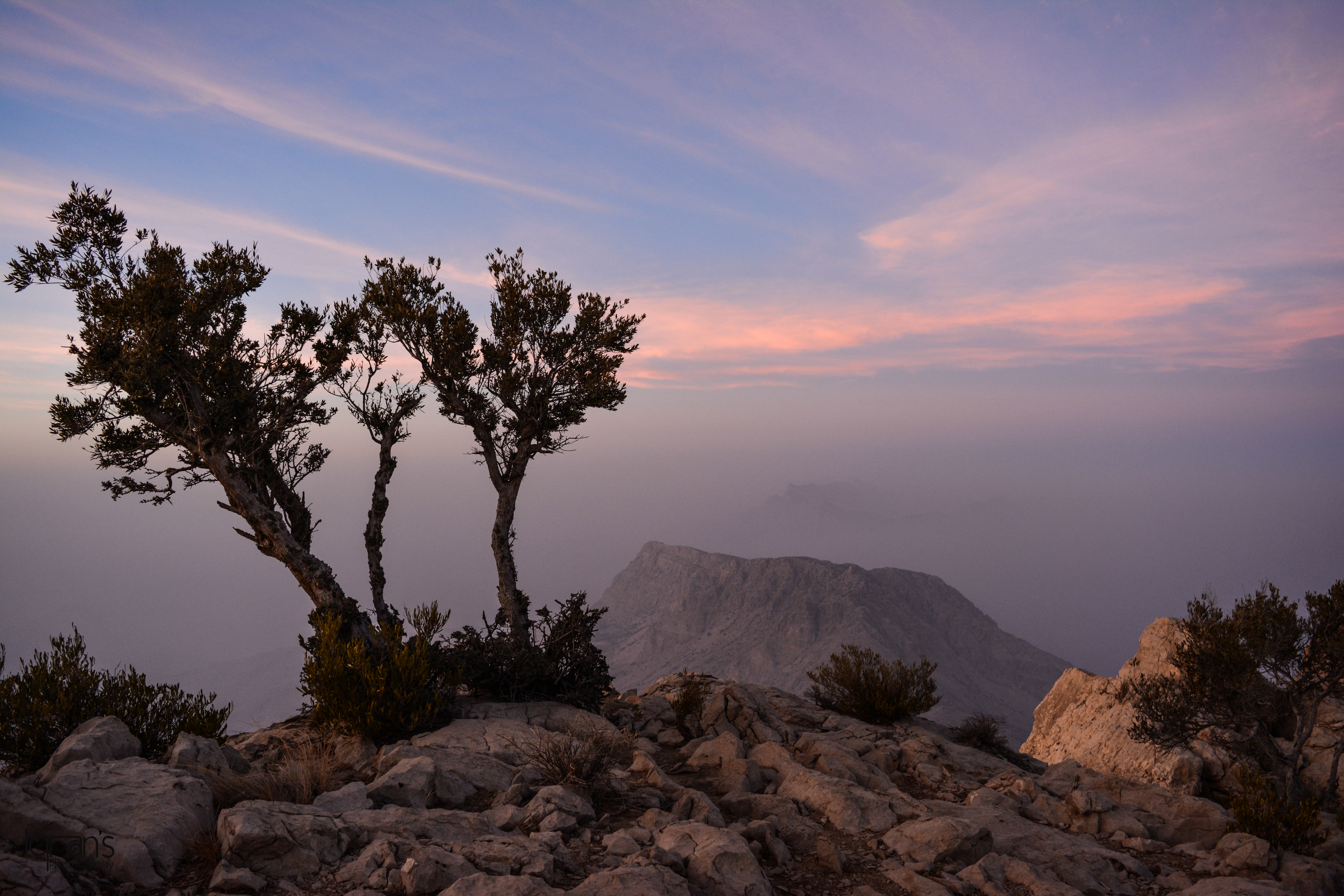

=== Description ===
- Zoning
- Roads
- Bridges
- Connecting Bridges
- Housing & Housing units of all categories
- Restaurants
- Hotels & Motels
- Hospitals
- Parks & Gardens
- Clubs & Courts
- Institutes
- Stadiums - Playing Units - Grounds
- Government Administration Blocks
- Commercial Blocks
- Recreation Facilities
- Executive Residential Units
- Administrative Residential Units
- Reservoirs
- Water Supply & Drainage System
- Electrification

== See also ==
- Bado Hill Station
