= Bado Hill Station =

Bado Hill Station بدو ھل اسٽيشن
- Hill station
- Country: Pakistan
- Province: Sindh
- District: Jamshoro

Area
  - Total: 20 km^{2} (7.7 sq mi)
- Elevation: 914 m (2,999 ft)

Population (2017)
  - Total: 347
- Time zone: PST (Pakistan Standard Time)

Bado Hill Station (also known as Bado Jabal Hill Station) (Urdu: بڈو, Sindhi: بڊو جبل) is a Hill Station located in Dadu District, Sindh, Pakistan. It is situated at an elevation of 3000 ft (914 m) in the Kirthar Mountains, 65 kilometers (40 mi) northwest of Sehwan It is an attractive place for nature-lovers due to its pleasant weather and beautiful surroundings as it is adjacent to several beautiful Plateaus and mountains of the Kirthar Ranges.

== See also ==
- Kirthar Mountains
- Gorakh Hill
