= Jahaz Banda =

Jahaz Banda جازبانډه
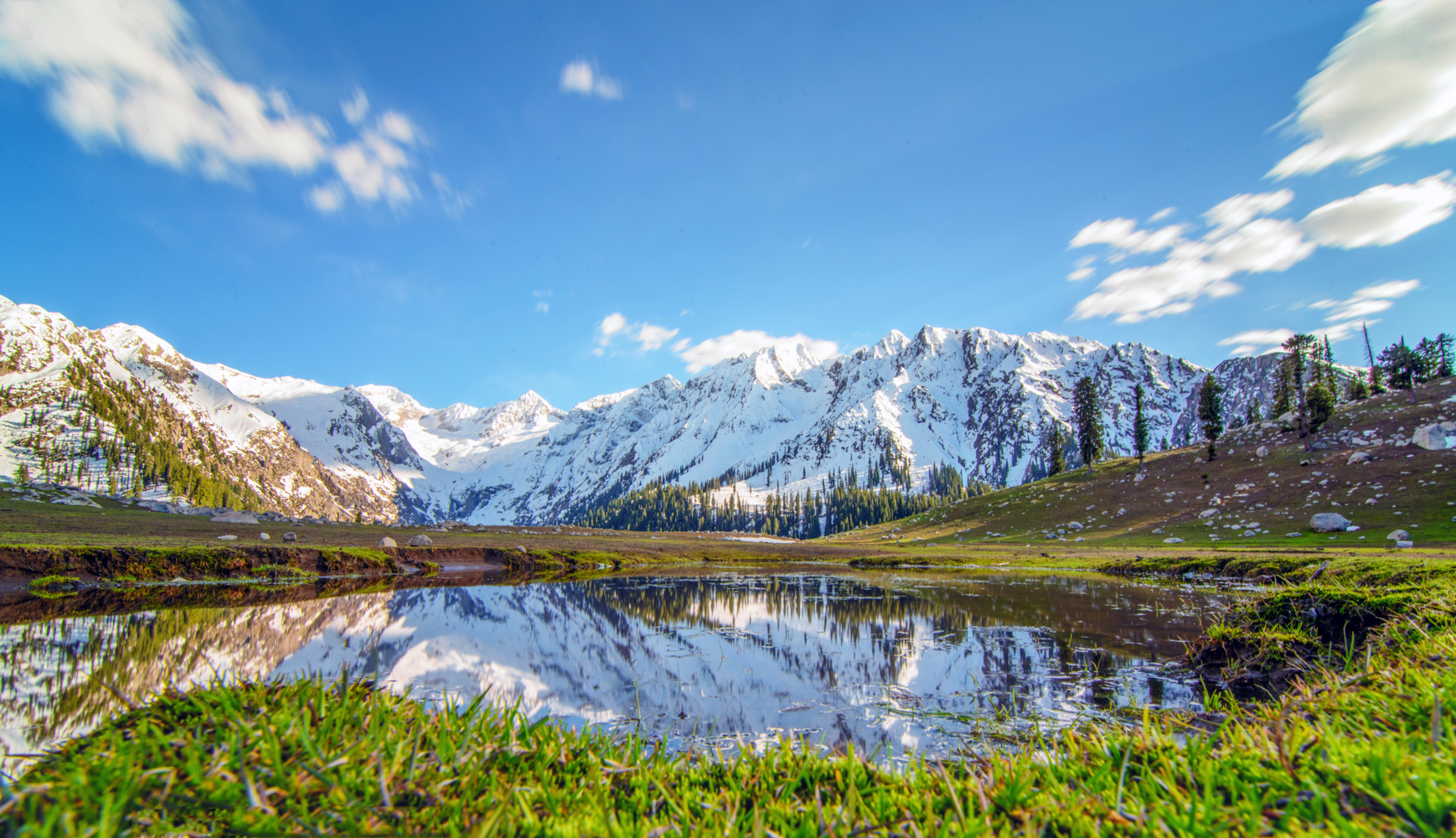
- Jahaz Banda, Kumrat Valley

- Location in Khyber Pakhtunkhwa Location in Pakistan
- Coordinates: 35°23′34.6″N 72°18′21.8″E
- Country: Pakistan
- Province: Khyber Pakhtunkhwa
- District: Upper Dir District

Jahaz Banda (Pashto: جازبانډه), also spelt as Jaaz Banda, is a large meadow in the upper reaches of Kumrat Valley in Upper Dir District of the Khyber Pakhtunkhwa province of Pakistan. It is located at an altitude of 3,100 m above sea level. The region is surrounded by snow-clad mountains, towering trees, and green pastures.

The main road extends northward through Upper Dir, eventually arriving at Darwaza village. At this point, the road diverges, branching off into Lamoti village. From there, it ascends toward Jandrai village via a passable but unpaved road suitable for jeeps. Beyond this point, the journey transitions to a trek, leading to Jahaz Banda.

== Gallery ==
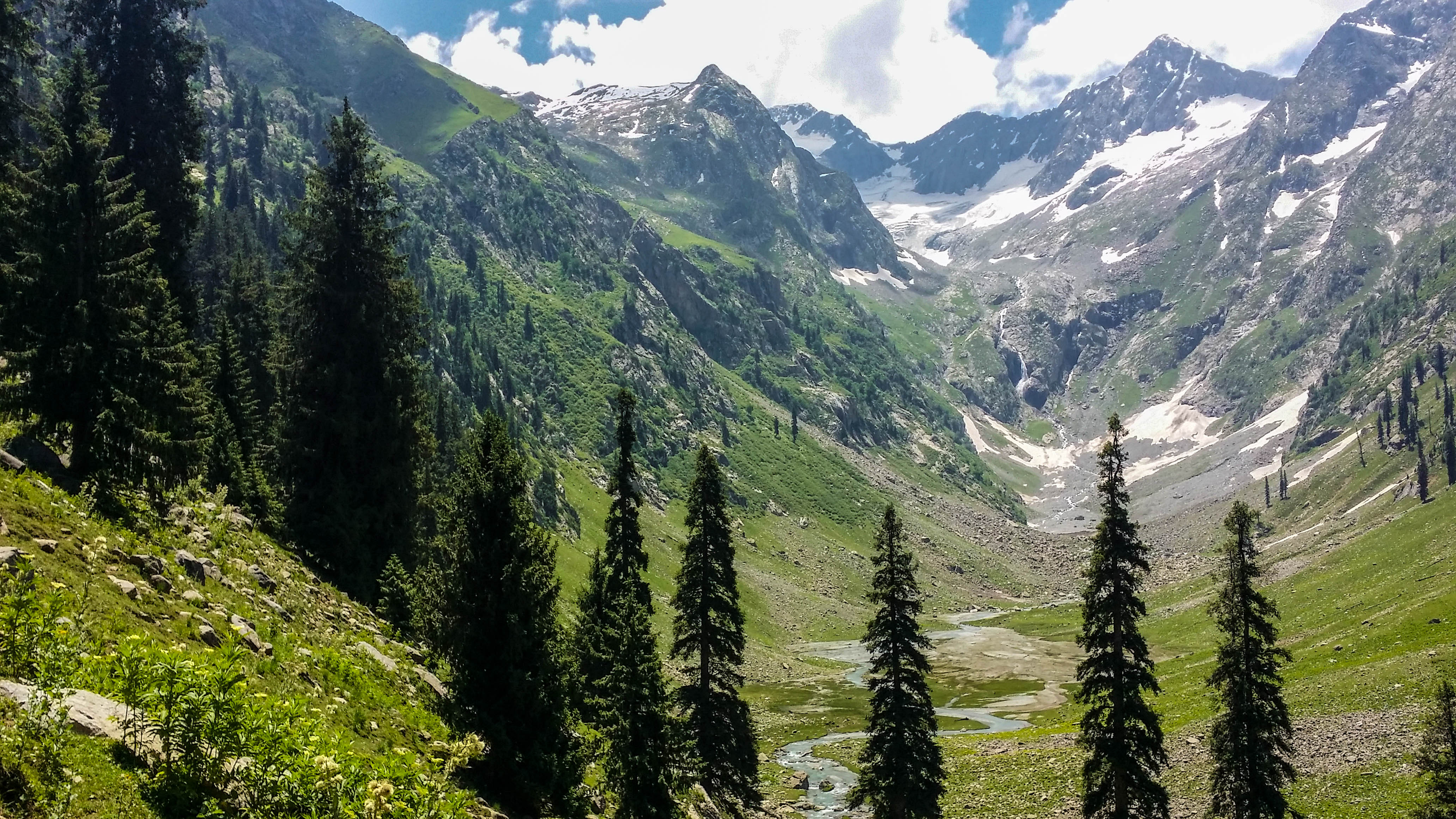

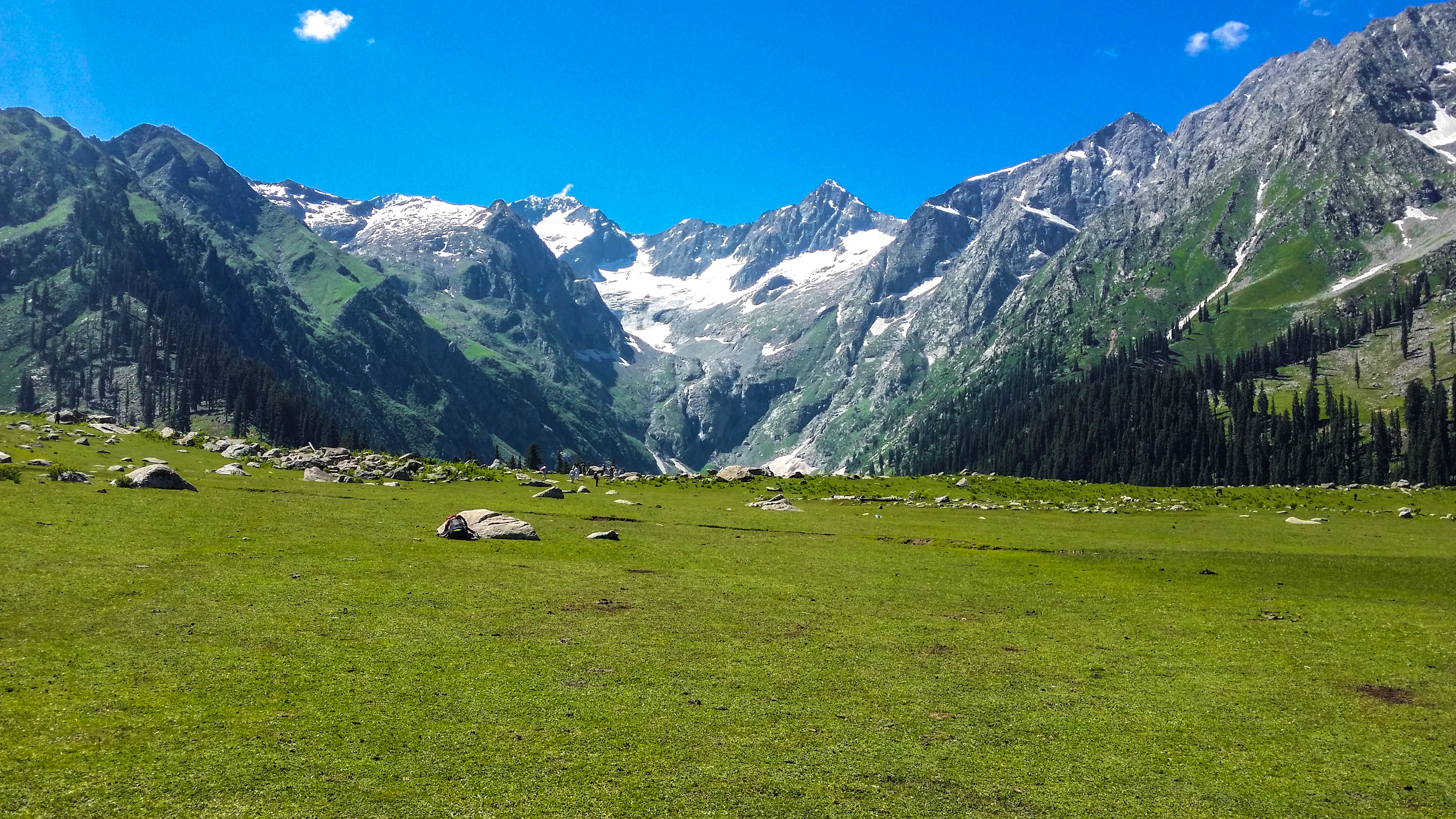

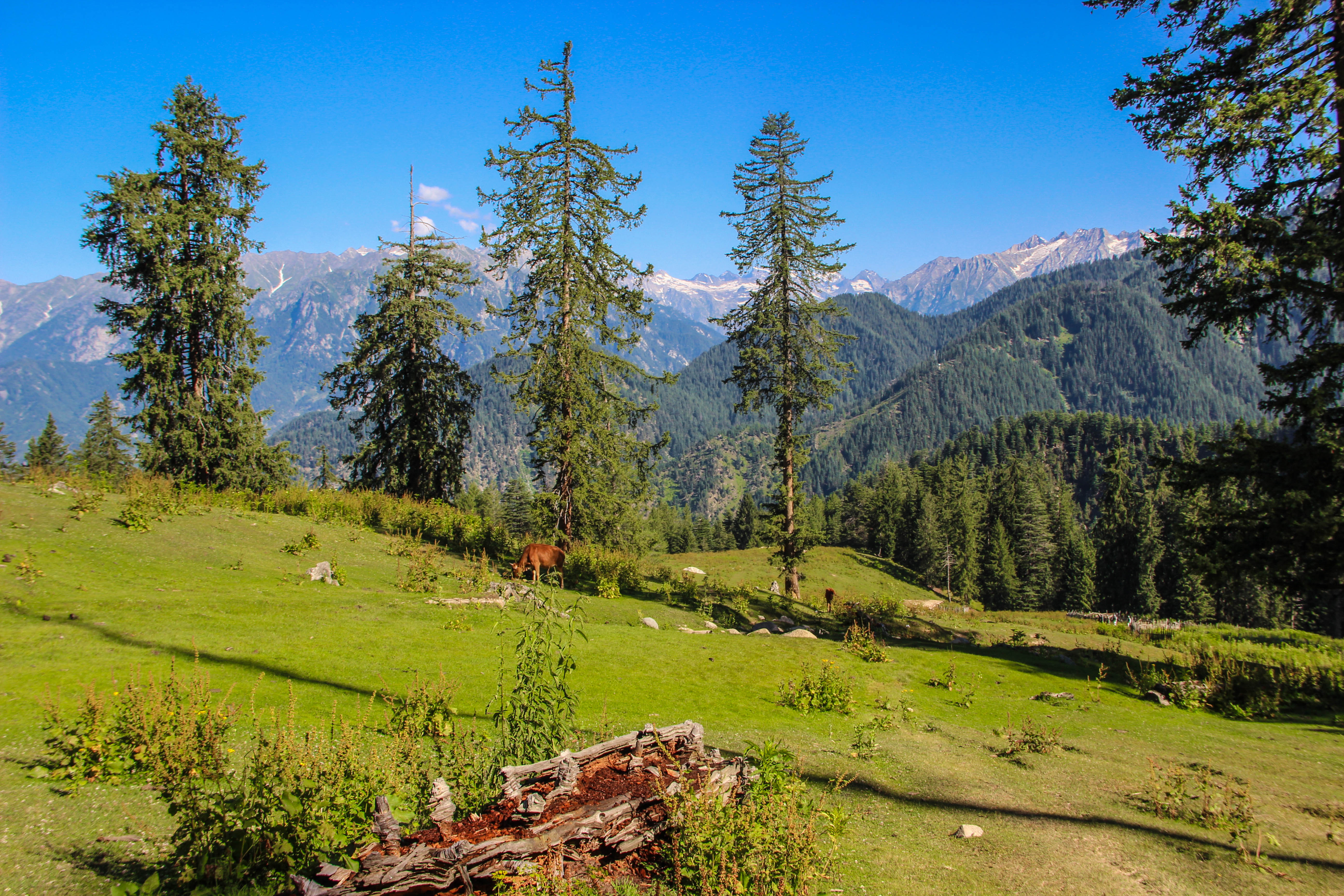

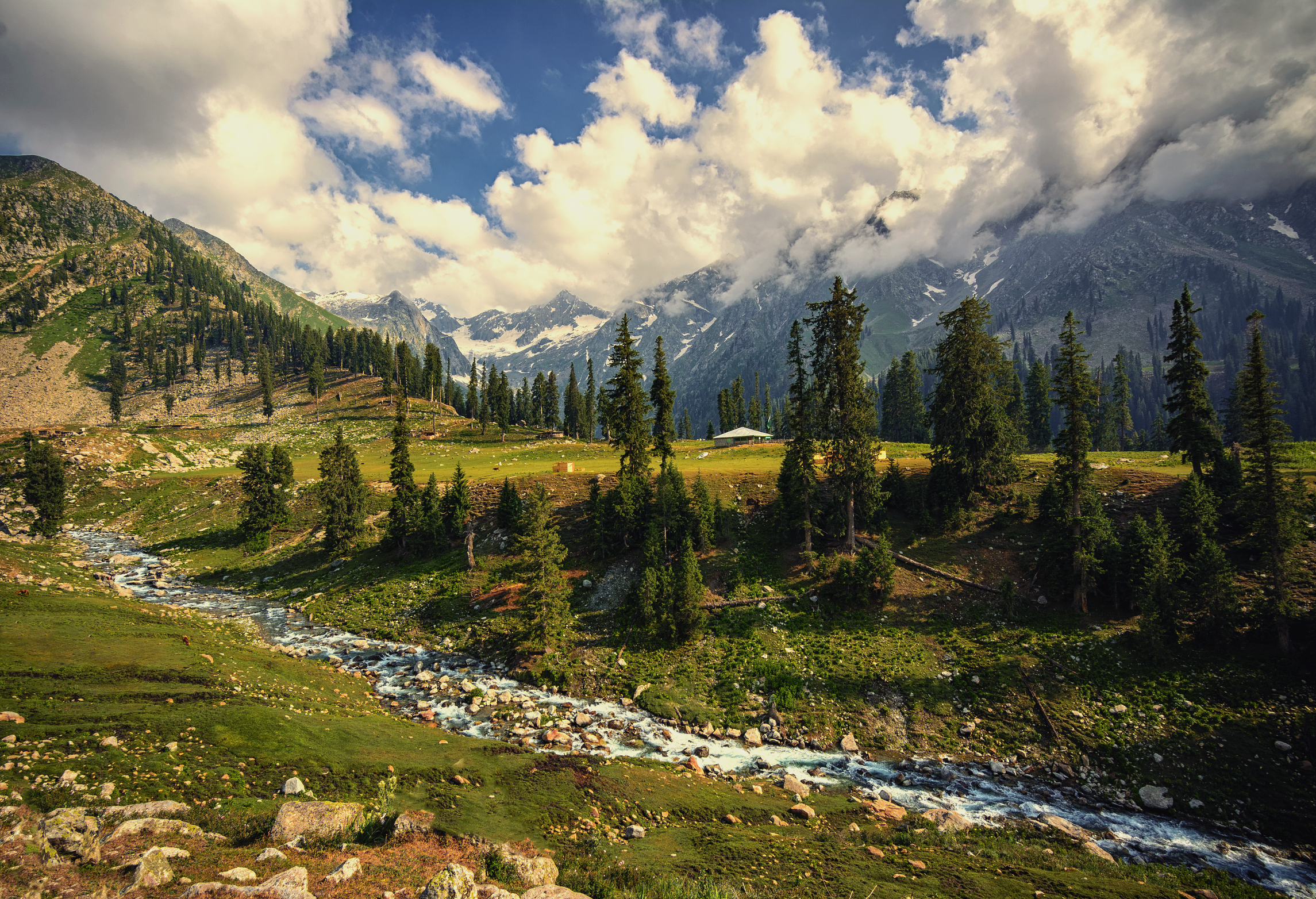

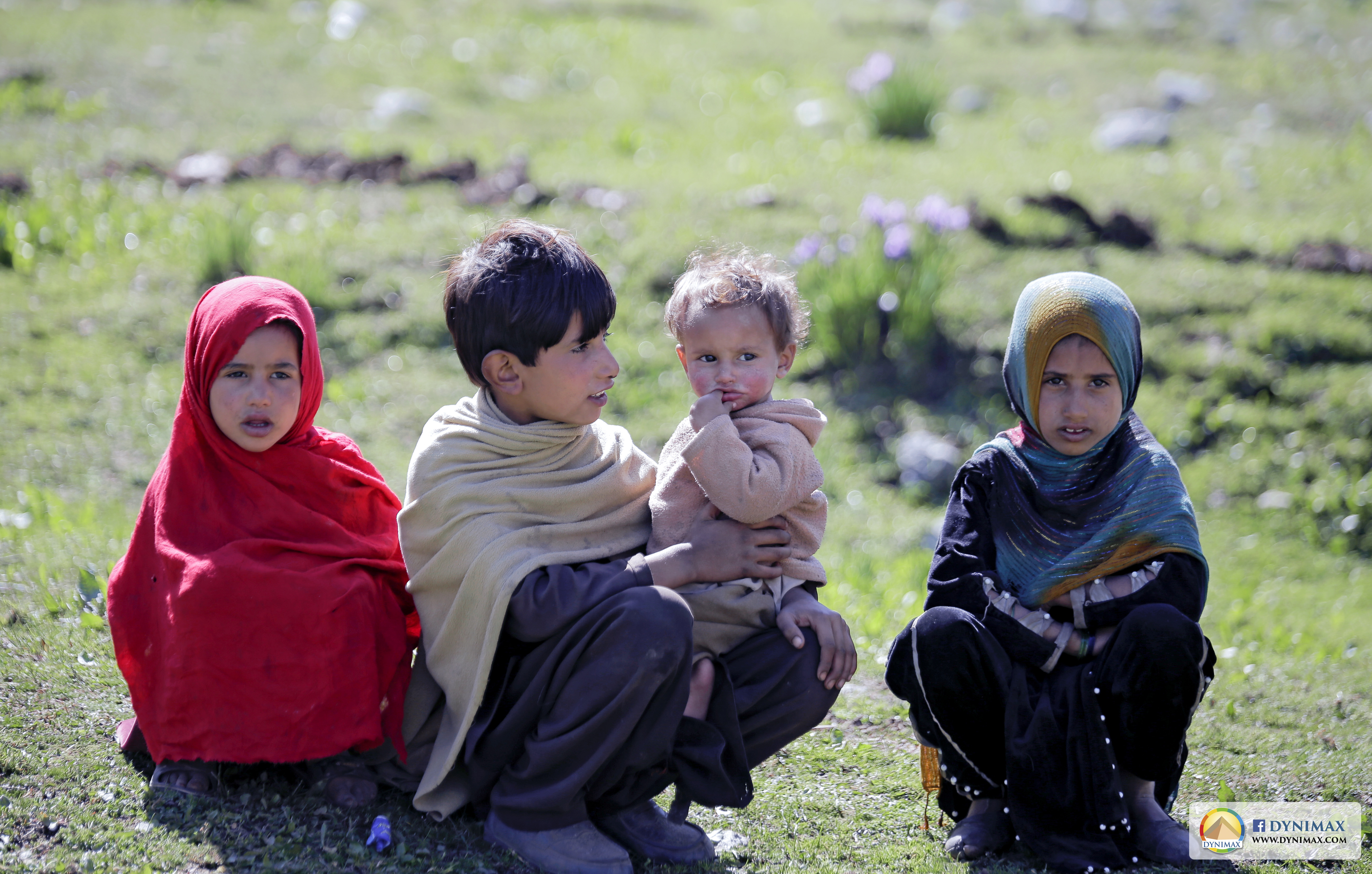
Kids and visitors in Jahaz Banda

== See also ==
- Kumrat Valley
- Katora Lake
- Ushirai Dara
- Laram Top
