= List of political parties in Bangladesh =

From the restoration of parliamentary democracy in 1991, Bangladesh has a fading two-party system, which means that two political parties dominate the general elections, with extreme difficulty for anybody to achieve electoral success under the banner of another party. Since 2026, two dominant parties are Bangladesh Nationalist Party (BNP) and Bangladesh Jamaat-e-Islami.

== History ==
The current parliamentary system in the country was established in 1991 and is modelled after the Westminster system. Before this, the nation experienced a period of military rule from 1975 to 1990. In response to demands from the two major political parties, the Awami League (AL) and the Bangladesh Nationalist Party (BNP), a caretaker government was introduced in 1990 following the resignation of military ruler Lieutenant General Hussain Muhammad Ershad. Chief Justice Shahabuddin Ahmed was appointed as the Chief Advisor and oversaw the 1991 general election.

The caretaker government is led by a Chief Advisor who holds powers similar to those of a regular prime minister, except for defense matters. The Advisors function in roles akin to ministers. Following the 1991 elections, caretaker governments also facilitated the elections in 1996, 2001, and 2008. Initially intended to support the transition from authoritarianism to democracy, the caretaker system was institutionalized in 1996 by the Sixth Parliament due to increasing mistrust between the BNP and AL.

In 2011, the Awami League, then in power, abolished the caretaker government system. This decision has since been a significant point of contention between Awami League and Bangladesh Nationalist Party, contributing to ongoing political disputes.

== Composition of the Parliament ==
The Jatiya Sangsad is made up of 350 members, 300 members were elected by direct votes, and 50 women members were elected by the parties according to their popular voting percentage in the general election.

Party	Leader	Ideology	Political position	MPs	Local governments				Alliance	Parliamentary position
Party	Leader	Ideology	Political position	MPs	Cities	Upazila	Municipalities	Villages	Alliance	Parliamentary position
Bangladesh Nationalist Party	Tarique Rahman	Conservatism; Neoliberalism; Liberalism	Centre to centre-right	246 / 350	1 / 1	vacant	vacant		BNP+	Government
Bangladesh Jamaat-e-Islami	Shafiqur Rahman	Islamism; Conservatism; Neo-Islamism; Reformism	Right-wing to far-right	77 / 350	0 / 1	vacant	vacant		11 Parties	Opposition
National Citizen Party	Nahid Islam	Reformism; Third Way; Pluralism	Centre	8 / 350	0 / 1	vacant	vacant		11 Parties	Opposition
Bangladesh Khelafat Majlis	Mamunul Haque	Islamism; Pan-Islamism; Caliphatism; Social conservatism; Deobandism	Far-right	3 / 350	0 / 1	vacant	vacant		11 Parties	Opposition
Islami Andolan Bangladesh	Syed Rezaul Karim	Islamism; Islamic fundamentalism; Social conservatism; Deobandism; Reactionism	Far-right	1 / 350	0 / 1	vacant	vacant		—N/a	Opposition
Khelafat Majlis	Abdul Basit Azad	Islamism; Islamic fundamentalism; Pan-Islamism; Caliphatism; Social conservatism; Deobandism	Far-right	1 / 350	0 / 1	vacant	vacant		11 Parties	Opposition
Gono Odhikar Parishad	Nurul Haque Nur		Centre	1 / 350	0 / 1	vacant	vacant		BNP+	Government
Ganosanhati Andolan	Zonayed Saki	Egalitarianism		1 / 350	0 / 1	vacant	vacant		BNP+	Government
Bangladesh Jatiya Party	Andaleeve Rahman	Bangladeshi nationalism		1 / 350	0 / 1	vacant	vacant		BNP+	Government
Independent politicians	—N/a	—N/a	—N/a	8 / 350	0 / 1	vacant	vacant		—N/a	—N/a

== Coalitions ==
=== Democratic United Front ===
The Democratic United Front (Bengali: গণতান্ত্রিক যুক্তফ্রন্ট) is a coalition of ten left-wing political parties. It was formed on 29 November 2025. Four of the member parties – the Communist Party of Bangladesh, Socialist Party of Bangladesh, Socialist Party of Bangladesh (Marxist), and the Bangladesh Jatiya Samajtantrik Dal – are registered with the Bangladesh Election Commission. The remaining six parties are unregistered.

=== 11 Party Alliance ===
The 11 Party Alliance (Bengali: ১১ দলীয় নির্বাচনী ঐক্য, lit. '11 Party Electoral Union'), (Note: Despite the name, the alliance currently has 10 member parties.) also simply referred to as the 11 Parties, is a major right-wing electoral alliance in Bangladesh, primarily consisting of Islamist parties. The alliance is led by the Bangladesh Jamaat-e-Islami. The parties have competed in the 2026 general election, and won 77 seats. Currently, it consists of 9 members.

The Islami Andolan Bangladesh withdrew from the alliance, expressing dissatisfaction with the seat agreement.

== Defunct Coalitions ==
=== Grand Alliance ===
The Grand Alliance (Bengali: মহাজোট) was an alliance of political parties in Bangladesh that was formed in 2008. It consist of the Awami League, Jatiya Party (Ershad), Jatiya Samajtantrik Dal, Workers Party, Liberal Democratic Party, Jatiya Party (Manju), Bangladesh Tarikat Federation, Ganatantri Dol, Communist Party of Bangladesh (Marxist-Leninist) (Barua) and Bikalpa Dhara Bangladesh.

The Liberal Democratic Party left the Grand Alliance before the election and contested independently. It joined the 18 Party Alliance in 2012.

=== 20 Party Alliance ===
The 20 Party Alliance was a Bangladeshi big tent political coalition led by the Bangladesh Nationalist Party (BNP). It was originally formed as the 18 Party Alliance on 18 April 2012 in Dhaka, extending its predecessor the 4 Party Alliance. The Alliance was formed in an effort to strengthen the opposition's demands for restoring the caretaker government system used between 1996 and 2008. The main rival of this coalition was the Grand Alliance, led by Awami League, which came into power after the election in 2008. The 20 Party Alliance was dissolved on 9 December 2022.

=== Ganatantra Manch ===
Ganatantra Manch (Bengali: গণতন্ত্র মঞ্চ) was a political alliance consisting of six political parties in Bangladesh. The alliance announced its formation on 8 August 2024 and consisted of the Jatiya Samajtantrik Dal (Rab), the Nagorik Oikko, the Revolutionary Workers Party of Bangladesh, the Bhasani Anusari Parishad, the Rastro Songskar Andolon and the Ganosanhati Andolan. The Gono Odhikar Parishad was initially with the alliance, but in May 2023, they left the alliance. The coalition effectively ceased to function after Rashtra Sanskar Andolon and several allied parties withdrew and began pursuing a new alliance with National Citizen Party.

=== National Democratic Front ===
The National Democratic Front (Bengali: জাতীয় গণতান্ত্রিক ফ্রন্ট, romanised: Jātīẏô Gôṇôtāntrik Phrônṭ, abbreviated: NDF) is a Bangladeshi multi-party political alliance led by the Anisul faction of the Jatiya Party (Ershad) and the Jatiya Party (Manju). It was founded on 8 December 2025, ahead of the 2026 general election. The alliance structurally collapsed during the 2026 election cycle after the Election Commission denied its leading faction the official Jatiya Party (E) plough symbol and disqualified its chairman Anisul Islam Mahmud from the ballot.

=== Left Democratic Alliance ===
The Left Democratic Alliance is an alliance of six leftist political parties including Communist Party of Bangladesh, Socialist Party of Bangladesh, Socialist Party of Bangladesh (Marxist), Revolutionary Communist League of Bangladesh.

=== United Front ===
The United Front was a coalition of political parties in East Bengal that contested and won Pakistan's first provincial general election to the East Bengal Legislative Assembly. The coalition consisted of the Awami Muslim League, the Krishak Praja Party, the Ganatantri Dal (Democratic Party), and Nizam-e-Islam.

== Registered parties ==
These are all the parties that are currently registered under Election Commission.

No.	Name		Founded	Symbol	Flag	Leader	Ideology	Political position
1	LDP	Liberal Democratic Party লিবারেল ডেমোক্রেটিক পার্টি	2006			Oli Ahmed	Economic liberalism National conservatism	Centre-right
2	JP-M	Jatiya Party (Manju) জাতীয় পার্টি (মঞ্জু)	1999			Anwar Hossain Manju	Bangladeshi nationalism Conservatism	Centre-right
3	BSD-ML	Bangladesh Samyabadi Dal বাংলাদেশের সাম্যবাদী দল	1973			Dilip Barua	Communism; Marxism–Leninism	Far-left
4	KSJL	Krishak Sramik Janata League কৃষক শ্রমিক জনতা লীগ	1999			Abdul Kader Siddique	Mujibism	
5	CPB	Communist Party of Bangladesh বাংলাদেশের কমিউনিস্ট পার্টি	1968			Kazi Sajjad Zahir Chandan	Communism; Marxism-Leninism; Anti-imperialism	Far-left
7	BNP	Bangladesh Nationalist Party বাংলাদেশ জাতীয়তাবাদী দল	1978			Tarique Rahman	Conservatism; Liberalism; Economic liberalism	Centre to centre-right
8	GP	Ganatantri Party গণতন্ত্রী পার্টি	1990			Md. Arash Ali	Secularism	
9	NAP	National Awami Party ন্যাশনাল আওয়ামী পার্টি	1967			Amina Ahmed	Socialism	Left-wing
10	WPB	Workers Party of Bangladesh বাংলাদেশের ওয়ার্কার্স পার্টি	1980			Rashed Khan Menon	Communism; Marxism-Leninism	Far-left
11	BDB	Bikalpa Dhara Bangladesh বিকল্পধারা বাংলাদেশ	2004				Bangladeshi nationalism Conservatism	Centre
12	JP-E	Jatiya Party (Ershad) জাতীয় পার্টি (এরশাদ)	1986			GM Quader	Bangladeshi nationalism Conservatism	Centre-right
13	JASAD	Jatiya Samajtantrik Dal জাতীয় সমাজতান্ত্রিক দল	1972			Hasanul Haq Inu	Left-wing nationalism	Centre-left
14	BJI	Bangladesh Jamaat-e-Islami বাংলাদেশ জামায়াতে ইসলামী	1948			Shafiqur Rahman	Islamism; Conservatism; Neo-Islamism; Reformism	Far-right
15	JSD	Jatiya Samajtantrik Dal (Rab) জাতীয় সমাজতান্ত্রিক দল	2002			A. S. M. Abdur Rab	Socialism	Left-wing
16	ZP	Zaker Party জাকের পার্টি	1989			Mustafa Amir Faisal	Sufism	Right-wing
17	SPB	Socialist Party of Bangladesh বাংলাদেশের সমাজতান্ত্রিক দল	1980			Bazlur Rashid Firoz	Communism; Marxism-Leninism; Anti-imperialism	Far-left
18	BJP	Bangladesh Jatiya Party বাংলাদেশ জাতীয় পার্টি	2001			Andaleeve Rahman	Bangladeshi nationalism	Centre
19	BTF	Bangladesh Tarikat Federation বাংলাদেশ তরিকত ফেডারেশন	2005			Syed Najibul Bashar	Sufism (Maizbhandarism); Secularism	Right-wing
20	BKF	Khilafat Andolan বাংলাদেশ খেলাফত আন্দোলন	1981			Habibullah Miazi	Islamism	Far-right
21	BML	Bangladesh Muslim League বাংলাদেশ মুসলিম লীগ	1906			Mohsin Rashid	Muslim nationalism	Far-right
22	NPP	National People's Party ন্যাশনাল পিপলস্‌ পার্টি	2007			Sheikh Salauddin Salu	Bangladeshi nationalism	Centre-left
23	JUI	Jamiat Ulema-e-Islam Bangladesh জমিয়তে উলামায়ে ইসলাম বাংলাদেশ	1972			Ubaydullah Faruq	Islamism	Far-right
24	GF	Gano Forum গণফোরাম	1992			Subrata Chowdhury	Secularism	Centre
25	GF	Gano Front গণফ্রন্ট	1995			Md. Akmal Hossain	Democratic socialism Secularism	Left-wing
27	BNAP	Bangladesh National Awami Party (Bhasani) বাংলাদেশ ন্যাশনাল আওয়ামী পার্টি-বাংলাদেশ ন্যাপ	2006			Jebel Rahman Ghaani	Socialism	Left-wing
28	BJP	Bangladesh Jatiya Party (Mukit) বাংলাদেশ জাতীয় পার্টি	2003			M. A. Mukit		
30	IFB	Islamic Front Bangladesh ইসলামিক ফ্রন্ট বাংলাদেশ	1990			Bahadur Shah Mujaddedi	Mujaddedism	Far-right
31	BKP	Bangladesh Kalyan Party বাংলাদেশ কল্যাণ পার্টি	2007			Syed Muhammad Ibrahim	Islamic democracy Bangladeshi nationalism Economic liberalism	Centre-right
32	IOJ	Islami Oikya Jote ইসলামী ঐক্যজোট	1990			Abdul Qadir	Islamism	Far-right
33	BKM	Bangladesh Khelafat Majlis বাংলাদেশ খেলাফত মজলিস	1989			Mamunul Haque	Islamism	Far-right
34	IAB	Islami Andolan Bangladesh ইসলামী আন্দোলন বাংলাদেশ	1987			Syed Rezaul Karim	Reactionary Islamism	Far-right
35	BIF	Bangladesh Islami Front বাংলাদেশ ইসলামী ফ্রন্ট	1990			M. A. Matin	Islamic fundamentalism	Far-right
36	JAGPA	Jatiya Ganotantrik Party জাতীয় গণতান্ত্রিক পার্টি-জাগপা	1980			Tasmia Pradhan	Conservatism	Right-wing
37	BBWP	Revolutionary Workers Party of Bangladesh বাংলাদেশের বিপ্লবী ওয়ার্কার্স পার্টি	2004			Saif Ul Haque	Communism; Marxism-Leninism	Far-left
38	KM	Khelafat Majlis খেলাফত মজলিস	1989			Abdul Basit Azad	Islamism	Far-right
40	BML	Bangladesh Muslim League-BML বাংলাদেশ মুসলিম লীগ-বিএমএল	1982			A. H. M. Kamruzzaman	Muslim nationalism	
41	Muktijote	Bangladesh Sangskritik Muktijote বাংলাদেশ সাংস্কৃতিক মুক্তিজোট	2000			Abu Layes Munna	Culturalism	
42	BNF	Bangladesh Nationalist Front বাংলাদেশ ন্যাশনালিস্ট ফ্রন্ট	2012			M. A. Abul Kalam Azad	Economic liberalism	
43	NDM	Nationalist Democratic Movement জাতীয়তাবাদী গণতান্ত্রিক আন্দোলন	2017			Bobby Hajjaj	Bangladeshi nationalism	
44	BC	Bangladesh Congress বাংলাদেশ কংগ্রেস	2013			Kazi Rezaul Hossain	Economic liberalism	Centre-right
45	Trinomool; BNP	Trinomool BNP তৃণমূল বিএনপি	2015			Antara Selima Huda	Grassroots Democracy	Centre-right
46	Insaniyat	Insaniyat Biplob Bangladesh ইনসানিয়াত বিপ্লব বাংলাদেশ	2010			Allama Imam Hayat		
47	BJSAD	Bangladesh Jatiya Samajtantrik Dal বাংলাদেশ জাতীয় সমাজতান্ত্রিক দল-জাসদ	2023			Sharif Nurul Ambia	Socialism; Anti-imperialism	Left-wing
48	BNM	Bangladesh Nationalist Movement বাংলাদেশ জাতীয়তাবাদী আন্দোলন	2023			Abdur Rahman	Bangladeshi nationalism	
49	BSP	Bangladesh Supreme Party বাংলাদেশ সুপ্রিম পার্টি	2019			Sayed Saifuddin Ahmed	Sufism (Maizbhandarism)	Right-wing
50	AB; Party	Amar Bangladesh Party আমার বাংলাদেশ পার্টি	2020			Mojibur Rahman Monju		Far-right
51	GOP	Gono Odhikar Parishad গণঅধিকার পরিষদ-জিওপি	2021			Nurul Haque Nur	Progressivism	Centre
52	NO	Nagorik Oikko নাগরিক ঐক্য	2012			Mahmudur Rahman Manna		Centre
53	GSA	Ganosanhati Andolan গণসংহতি আন্দোলন	2002			Zonayed Saki	Egalitarianism	
54	BDP	Bangladesh Development Party বাংলাদেশ ডেভেলপমেন্ট পার্টি	2022			Anwarul Islam Chand		Centre-right
55	BMJP	Bangladesh Minority Janata Party বাংলাদেশ মাইনরিটি জনতা পার্টি	2017			Sukriti Kumar Mondal	Minority interests	
56	NCP	National Citizen Party জাতীয় নাগরিক পার্টি	2025			Nahid Islam	Reformism; Third Way	Centre or Right-wing
57	BLP	Bangladesh Labour Party বাংলাদেশ লেবার পার্টি‌	1974			Mostafizur Rahman Iran	Bangladeshi nationalism	Centre
58	BRP	Bangladesh Republican Party বাংলাদেশ রিপাবলিকান পার্টি	2014			K. M. Abu Hanif Hridoy		
59	SPBM	Socialist Party of Bangladesh (Marxist) বাংলাদেশের সমাজতান্ত্রিক দল (মার্কসবাদী)	2013			Masud Rana	Communism; Marxism-Leninism; Anti-imperialism	Far-left
60	JD	Janotar Dol জনতার দল	2025			Md. Shamim Kamal		
61	AD	Amjanatar Dol আমজনতার দল	2025			Tarek Rahman		
62	BEP	Bangladesh Equal Right Party বাংলাদেশ সমঅধিকার পার্টি	2025					
63	BNIP	Bangladesh Nizam-e-Islam Party বাংলাদেশ নেজামে ইসলাম পার্টি	2025			Sarwar Kamal Azizi	Islamism	Far-right

== Regional parties ==
Name		Founded	Ideology	Leader	Political position
PCJSS	Parbatya Chattagram Jana Samhati Samiti পার্বত্য চট্টগ্রাম জনসংহতি সমিতি	1972	Autonomy of the indigenous tribes of the Chittagong Hill Tracts	Shantu Larma	Left-wing
UPDF	United People's Democratic Front ইউনাইটেড পিপলস ডেমোক্রেটিক ফ্রন্ট	1998	Autonomy of the indigenous tribes of the Chittagong Hill Tracts	Prasit Bikash Khisa	Left-wing
PCJSS-MN Larma	Parbatya Chattagram Jana Samhati Samiti (MN Larma)	2007	Autonomy of the indigenous tribes of the Chittagong Hill Tracts	Juddho Chakma	Left-wing
UPDF-Democratic	United People's Democratic Front (Democratic)	2017	Autonomy of the indigenous tribes of the Chittagong Hill Tracts	Tapan Jyoti Chakma	Left-wing

== Outlawed parties ==
Name	Founded	Ideology	Leader	Political position	Legal status	Note
Awami League	1949		Sheikh Hasina	Big tent	Suspended	
Purba Banglar Communist Party	1968	Communism; Maoism	Tipu Biswas	Far-left	Banned	
Purba Banglar Sarbahara Party	1971	Communism; Marxism–Leninism–Maoism	Anwar Kabir	Far-left	Banned	
Bangladesh Krishak Sramik Awami League	1975	Mujibism	Sheikh Mujibur Rahman	Big tent	Banned	
Hizb ut-Tahrir	2000	Salafism; Anti-democracy	Ata Abu Rashta (global)	Far-right	Outlawed	
Maoist Bolshevik Reorganization Movement of the Purba Bangla Sarbahara Party	2001	Communism; Maoism		Far-left	Outlawed	
Kuki-Chin National Front	2008	Kuki-Chin autonomy	Nathan Bom		Banned	

== Unregistered parties ==
- Bangladesh Freedom Party
- Bangladesh Justice Party
- Bangladesh Social Democratic Party
- Bangladesh Popular Party
- Bangladesh National Justice Party
- Krishak Sramik Party
- National Revolutionary Council
- Nation State Movement
- Bangala Saltanat Harakat
- Muslim Bangali Resistance Council

== Defunct parties ==
- Awami League (Mizan)
- Bangladesh Krishak Sramik Awami League (1983–1991)
- Bangladesh National Congress
- Islamic Democratic League
- Jatiya League

== See also ==
- Politics of Bangladesh
- List of political parties by country
