= 2024 elections in Bangladesh =

Elections in Bangladesh
- 2024

Elections in Bangladesh in 2024 include the general election, by-elections to the Jatiya Sangsad, elections to two city corporations, several municipalities and local bodies.

== General election ==
General elections took place in Bangladesh on 7 January 2024, in accordance with the constitutional requirement, stating that elections must take place within the 90-day period before the expiration of the current term of the Jatiya Sangshad on 29 January 2024. The Awami League, led by incumbent Sheikh Hasina, won the election for the fourth consecutive time with only around 40% of the eligible voters voting.

Date	Government party before	Prime Minister before	Government party after	Elected Prime Minister
7 January 2024	Bangladesh Awami League	Sheikh Hasina	Bangladesh Awami League	Sheikh Hasina

== City corporation elections ==
Date	City Corporation	Mayor before election	Party before election	Elected Mayor	Party after election	Council after election	Ref.
9 March 2024	Mymensingh	Ekramul Haque Titu	Bangladesh Awami League	Ekramul Haque Titu	Bangladesh Awami League	AL 39 / 44 BNP 4 / 44 JSD 1 / 44	
9 March 2024	Comilla	Arfanul Haque Rifat	Bangladesh Awami League	Tahseen Bahar Shuchona	Bangladesh Awami League	AL 21 / 36 BNP 5 / 36 Jamaat 2 / 36 Independent 8 / 36	

== Subdistrict council elections ==
The subdistrict council elections will be held in 5 phrases. 4 of them will be happened in 2024. The 5th phrase of the local government election will be held in January 2025.

=== Result (1st to 4th phrase) ===
2024–25 Bangladeshi upazila election results (party-wise)
Party	Party Leader	Chairmen contested seats	Chairmen elected in Seats	+/-	Ref.
Awami League	Sheikh Hasina	492	407 / 495	▲87	
Jatiya Party (Ershad)	GM Quader	36	7 / 495	▲4	
Bangladesh Nationalist Party (expelled members)	Khaleda Zia	73 (expelled members)	20 / 495	▲20	
Jatiya Samajtantrik Dal	Hasanul Haq Inu	3	1 / 495	▲1	
Jatiya Party (Manju)	Anwar Hossain Manju	1	1 / 495	0	
Krishak Sramik Janata League	Abdul Kader Siddique	1	1 / 495	▲1	
Parbatya Chattagram Jana Samhati Samiti (regional)	Jyotirindra Bodhipriya Larma	35	4 / 495	▲4	
United People's Democratic Front (regional)	Prasit Bikash Khisa	26	5 / 495	▲5	
Independents		No Information	21 / 495	▼125	
