= 2024 Bangladeshi local elections =

Local elections in Bangladesh
- 2024

Local elections in Bangladesh in 2024 includes elections to the city corporation, district chairmen election, sub-district chairmen election and union council elections in several municipalities and local bodies.

== City corporation elections ==
Date	City Corporation	Mayor before election	Party before election	Elected Mayor	Party after election	Council after election	Ref.
9 March 2024	Mymensingh	Ekramul Haque Titu	Bangladesh Awami League	Ekramul Haque Titu	Bangladesh Awami League	AL 39 / 44 BNP 4 / 44 JSD 1 / 44	
9 March 2024	Comilla	Arfanul Haque Rifat	Bangladesh Awami League	Tahseen Bahar Shuchona	Bangladesh Awami League	AL 21 / 36 BNP 5 / 36 Jamaat 2 / 36 Independent 8 / 36	

== Subdistrict council elections ==
The subdistrict council elections will be held in 5 phases. Four of them took place in 2024. The 5th phase of the local government election will be held in January 2025.

=== Overall result ===
Party	Party Leader	Chairmen contested seats	Chairmen elected in Seats	+/-	Ref.
Awami League	Sheikh Hasina	492	407 / 495	▲87	
Jatiya Party (Ershad)	GM Quader	36	7 / 495	▲4	
Bangladesh Nationalist Party (expelled members)	Khaleda Zia	73 (expelled members)	20 / 495	▲20	
Jatiya Samajtantrik Dal	Hasanul Haq Inu	3	1 / 495	▲1	
Jatiya Party (Manju)	Anwar Hossain Manju	1	1 / 495	0	
Krishak Sramik Janata League	Abdul Kader Siddique	1	1 / 495	▲1	
Parbatya Chattagram Jana Samhati Samiti (regional)	Jyotirindra Bodhipriya Larma	35	4 / 495	▲4	
United People's Democratic Front (regional)	Prasit Bikash Khisa	26	5 / 495	▲5	
Independents		No Information	21 / 495	▼125	

=== 1st Phase ===
The first phase of sub-district elections was held on 8 May 2024. Chairmen competition was between of 139 seats. A low voter turnout of 36% was seen in elections.

Party	Party Leader	Chairmen elected in Seats	Ref.
Awami League	Sheikh Hasina	119 / 139	
Jatiya Party (Ershad)	GM Quader	2 / 139	
Bangladesh Nationalist Party (expelled members)	Khaleda Zia	8 / 139	
Parbatya Chattagram Jana Samhati Samiti (regional)	Jyotirindra Bodhipriya Larma	2 / 139	
Independents		8 / 139	

=== 2nd Phase ===
The second phase of sub-district elections was held on 21 May 2024. Chairmen competition was between of 156 seats. A low voter turnout of 37.67% was seen in election.

Party	Party Leader	Chairmen elected in Seats	Ref.
Awami League	Sheikh Hasina	139 / 156	
Jatiya Party (Ershad)	GM Quader	1 / 156	
Bangladesh Nationalist Party (expelled members)	Khaleda Zia	7 / 156	
Jatiya Party (Manju)	Anwar Hossain Manju	1 / 156	
Krishak Sramik Janata League	Abdul Kader Siddique	1 / 156	
Parbatya Chattagram Jana Samhati Samiti (regional)	Jyotirindra Bodhipriya Larma	1 / 156	
United People's Democratic Front (regional)	Prasit Bikash Khisa	1 / 156	
Independents		5 / 156	

=== 3rd Phase ===
The third phase of sub-district elections was held on 23 May 2024. Chairmen competition was between of 112 seats A low voter turnout of 35% was seen in election.

Party	Party Leader	Chairmen elected in Seats	Ref.
Awami League	Sheikh Hasina	98 / 112	
Jatiya Party (Ershad)	GM Quader	4 / 112	
Bangladesh Nationalist Party (expelled members)	Khaleda Zia	2 / 112	
Jatiya Samajtantrik Dal	Hasanul Haq Inu	1 / 112	
Parbatya Chattagram Jana Samhati Samiti (regional)	Jyotirindra Bodhipriya Larma	1 / 112	
United People's Democratic Front (regional)	Prasit Bikash Khisa	4 / 112	
Independents		2 / 112	

=== 4th Phase ===
The forth phase of sub-district elections was held on 5 June 2024. Chairmen competition was between of 60 seats A low voter turnout of 34.33% was seen in election.

Party	Party Leader	Chairmen elected in Seats	Ref.
Awami League	Sheikh Hasina	51 / 60	
Bangladesh Nationalist Party (expelled members)	Khaleda Zia	3 / 60	
Independents		6 / 60	

== Controversies ==
=== Boycotting election ===
BNP and its like minded parties boycotted the sub-district elections saying that they will not go in election under a autocratic government. However, despite the boycott, some party members from BNP contested in election. In result BNP expelled 73 members who were participating in the election. Other party like Jatiya Party (Ershad) and Awami League allied parties also showed no interest in participating in the election. Leading the sub-district election be a more of a competition between Awami League candidates.

=== Nepotism by Awami League ministers ===
Many top Awami League (AL) ministers and party lawmakers were accused of nepotism for announcing the names of their close relatives as chairman candidates for the upazila polls. AL general secretary Obaidul Quader said nepotism would not be allowed. Many AL ministers were accused of threatening their opposition candidates or the people of sub-district.

=== Violence ===
Many candidates supporters had clash with each other in the name of vote rigging. Several people were injured and some were considered dead during the brutal violence. Most of those violence was accused of done by Awami League candidates in the fear of losing.

=== Low voters turnout ===
The sub-district election saw the lowest vote turnout in last 16 years. Around all phases was having a turnout of 30-40%. 2nd phase of sub-district had the most vote turnout of only 37.67%. According to the Chief Election Commissioner, the vote turnout is low due to a "lack of widespread political participation".

== See also ==
- 2024 elections in Bangladesh
- 6th Upazila election
