= Ananda Mohan College =

Oldest college in Mymensingh, Bangladesh

Ananda Mohan College, Mymensingh
- আনন্দ মোহন কলেজ, ময়মনসিংহ
- Logo of Ananda Mohan College
- Former names: Mymensingh Institution; City Collegiate School; Mymensingh City College; Mymensingh College
- Motto: জ্ঞানের জন্য আসো, সেবার জন্য বেরিয়ে যাও (Bangla) Translation: Come for knowledge, go for hospitality
- Type: Public Government funded college
- Established: 1880; 146 years ago as Mymensingh Institution; 1908; 118 years ago as College
- Founder: Anandamohan Bose
- Academic affiliations: National University, Bangladesh; Mymensingh Education Board
- Chancellor: President Mirza Fakhrul Islam Alamgir
- Principal: Md. Shakir Hossain (Acting)
- Academic staff: 172
- Administrative staff: 7
- Students: 24,987
- Undergraduates: 13,945
- Postgraduates: 9,020
- Other students: 2022
- Location: College Road, Mymensingh City, 2200, Bangladesh; 24°45′41″N 90°23′59″E
- Campus: Urban area, 16.8 acres (6.8 ha)
- Language: Bengali
- Website: anandamohangovtcollege.edu.bd

Ananda Mohan College, Mymensingh (Bengali: আনন্দ মোহন কলেজ, ময়মনসিংহ) or Government Ananda Mohan College is a fully government-aided public college, affiliated to National University, Bangladesh and Mymensingh Education Board in Mymensingh, Bangladesh. One of the oldest educational premises in South Asia, the institute was established in 1880 by Ananda Mohan Bose as Mymensingh Institution during British Raj.

== History ==
Anandamohan Bose, who founded the City College in 1878, decided to open a branch of it at his home town in Mymensingh. In 1880, an educational institution was established at the residence of Ananda Mohan as Mymensingh Institution, later named the City Collegiate School in 1883. In 1901, City Collegiate School opened college section and named Mymensingh City College. Later on, the college section of the institution was shifted to College Road on 1 January 1908 as a college and then it was named after him. In 1964, the college was nationalized.

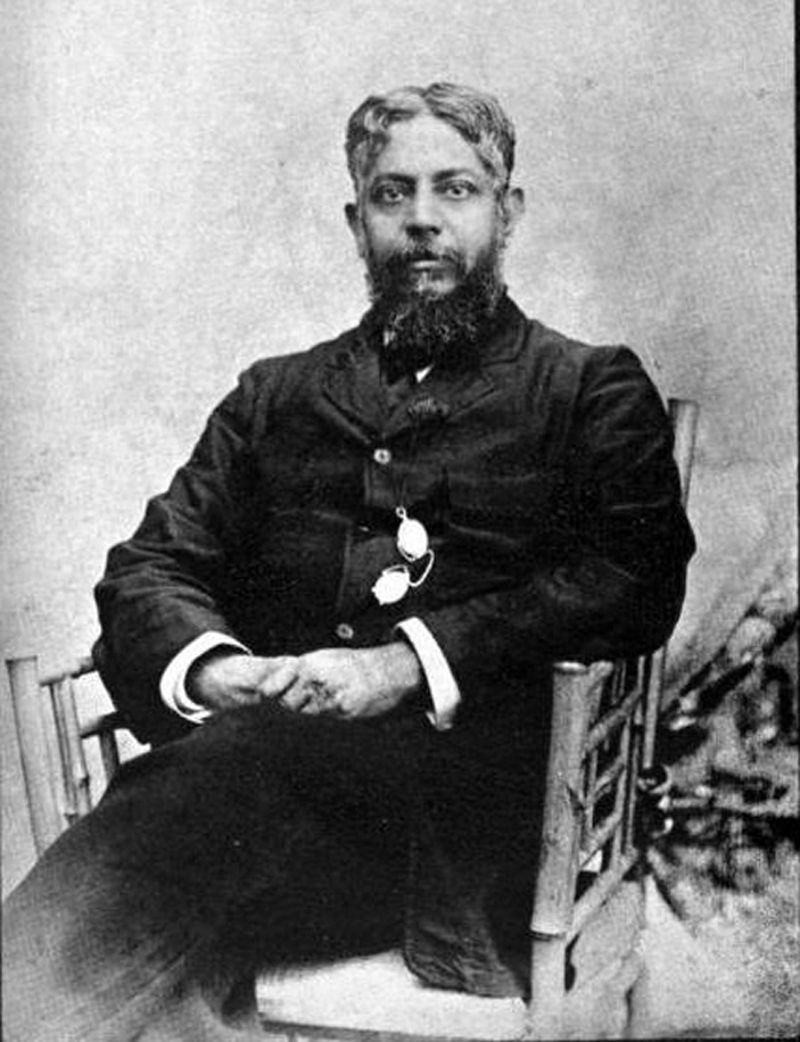
Ananda Mohan Bose, founder of this college

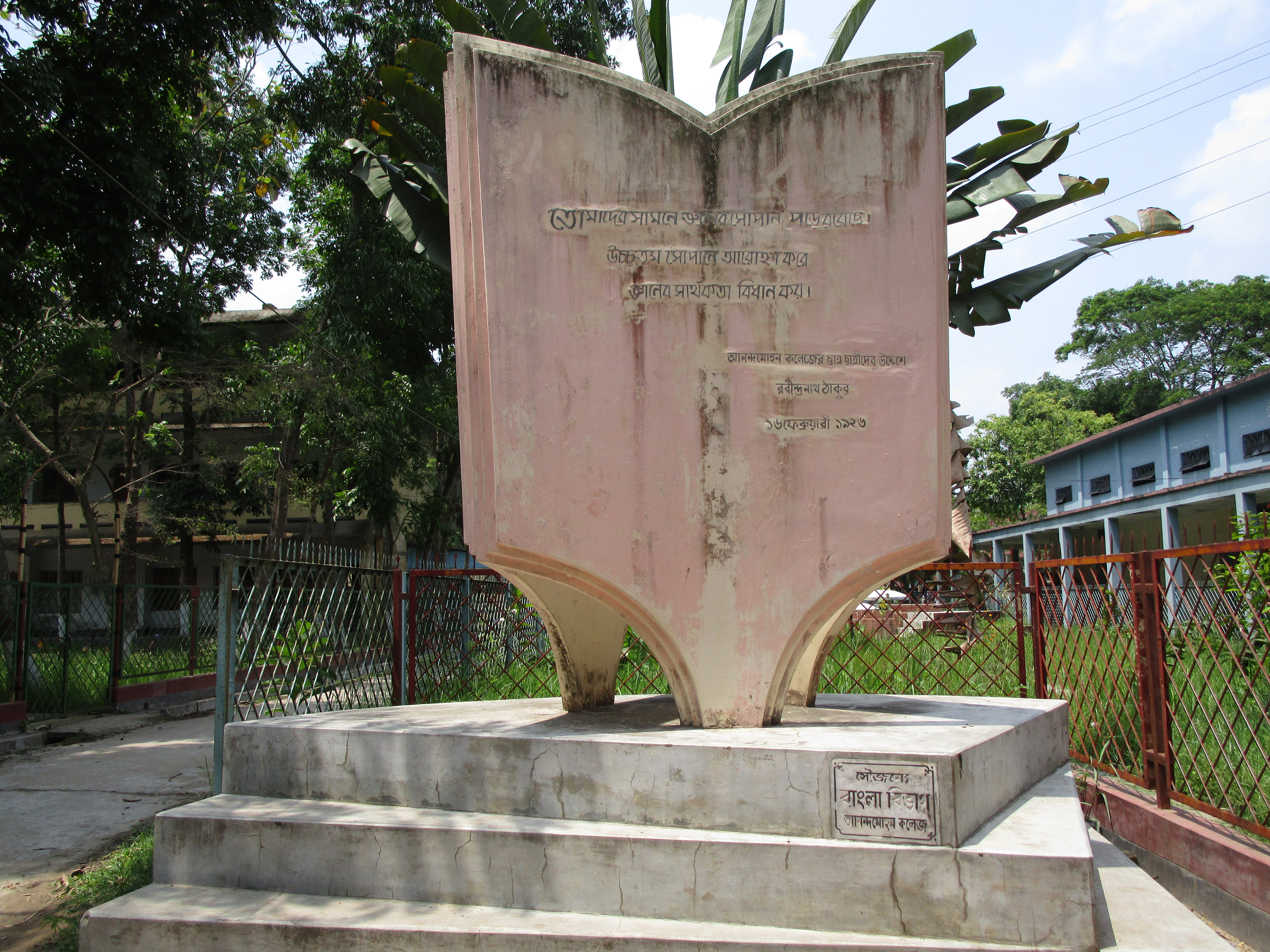
A monument of the visiting of Rabindranth Tagore at the Ananda Mohan College Campus on 16 February 1926

== Course ==
Currently, this college offers education in Science, Humanities, and Commerce streams at the Higher Secondary level under the Mymensingh Education Board. Additionally, it provides undergraduate honors courses in 20 subjects, postgraduate final courses in 18 subjects, and preliminary postgraduate courses. Although permission exists for undergraduate pass courses, classes for these are currently suspended.

As of 2024, the total number of students enrolled at the institution is 24,987, with 2,022 students at the Higher Secondary level, 13,945 in undergraduate honors programs, and 9,020 in postgraduate programs.

=== Higher Secondary ===
- Science
- Humanities
- Business Studies

=== Honours & Masters ===
Faculty	Department	Honours	Masters Final	Masters Preliminary
Faculty of Arts	Bangla	Yes	Yes	Yes
Faculty of Arts	English	Yes	Yes	Yes
Faculty of Arts	History	Yes	Yes	Yes
Faculty of Arts	Philosophy	Yes	Yes	Yes
Faculty of Arts	Islamic Studies	Yes	Yes	Yes
Faculty of Arts	Islamic History & Culture	Yes	Yes	Yes
Faculty of Social Science	Sociology	Yes	Yes	Yes
Faculty of Social Science	Economics	Yes	Yes	Yes
Faculty of Social Science	Political Science	Yes	Yes	Yes
Faculty of Social Science	Social Work	Yes	Yes	Yes
Faculty of Science	Chemistry	Yes	Yes	Yes
Faculty of Science	Physics	Yes	Yes	Yes
Faculty of Science	Mathematics	Yes	Yes	Yes
Faculty of Business Studies	Accounting and Information Systems	Yes	Yes	Yes
Faculty of Business Studies	Management Studies	Yes	Yes	Yes
Faculty of Business Studies	Marketing	Yes	No	No
Faculty of Business Studies	Finance and Banking	Yes	No	No
Faculty of Life & Earth Science	Zoology	Yes	Yes	Yes
Faculty of Life & Earth Science	Geography & Environmental Studies	Yes	Yes	Yes
Faculty of Life & Earth Science	Botany	Yes	Yes	Yes

== Notable alumni ==
- Nurul Amin – Bengali Politician and 8th Prime Minister of Pakistan and acting President of Pakistan
- Abul Fateh — diplomat, statesman and Sufi
- Mohammad Abdur Rouf, Justice and former Chief Election Commissioner of Bangladesh
- Surendra Mohan Ghose — revolutionary
- Syed Waliullah — novelist
- Nirmalendu Goon — poet
- Prabodh Chandra Goswami — educationist
- Ehsan Khan, architect
- Abdul Hye Mashreki — poet
- Niharranjan Ray — Historian
- P. C. Sorcar — magician
- Ekramul Haque Titu – Bangladeshi Politician and former Mayor of Mymensingh
- Illias Uddin Ahmed – footballer
- M. Iqbal Hossain, politician
- Kayser Kamal, politician
- A. Z. M. Zahid Hossain, politician

== See also ==
- Gurudayal Government College
- Muminunnisa Government Mohila College
- Nasirabad College, Mymensingh
- Pakundia Adarsha Mohila College
