= UPDF =

UPDF may refer to:

- Uganda People's Defence Force, the armed forces of Uganda
- UP Diksiyonaryong Filipino (UP Filipino Dictionary), a series of monolingual Filipino-language dictionaries
- United People's Democratic Front, a regional political party in Bangladesh's Chittagong Hill Tracts
- United People's Democratic Front (Democratic), a rival regional political party of the United People's Democratic Front
