= Democratic Reform Alliance =

Defunct political alliance in Bangladesh

Democratic Reform Alliance গণতান্ত্রিক সংস্কার জোট
- Leader: Nahid Islam; Mojibur Rahman Monju; Hasnat Quaiyum
- Spokesperson: Nasiruddin Patwary
- Founded: 7 December 2025
- Dissolved: December 30, 2025
- Merged into: 11 Party Alliance
- Ideology: Reformism
- Former member parties: National Citizen Party; Amar Bangladesh Party; Rashtra Sanskar Andolan
- Jatiya Sangsad: Parliament dissolved

Democratic Reform Alliance (Bengali: গণতান্ত্রিক সংস্কার জোট) was a short-lived political alliance in Bangladesh comprising three parties: the National Citizen Party (NCP), the Amar Bangladesh Party (AB Party), and the Rashtra Sanskar Andolan (RSA). Formed on 7 December 2025 ahead of the 2026 Bangladeshi general election, it was effectively dissolved on 30 December 2025 when the NCP joined the 11 Party Alliance.

== History ==
=== Background ===
Talks of broader alliances involving the NCP had been ongoing since October 2025, initially including potential nine-party or five-party coalitions with groups such as Gono Odhikar Parishad and others. Disagreements, particularly over inclusion of certain factions, delayed larger formations.

=== Formation and dissolution ===
The alliance was formally launched on 7 December 2025 at a press conference at the Dhaka Reporters Unity auditorium in Segunbagicha, Dhaka. NCP convener Nahid Islam described it as a political coalition focused on reform rather than just an electoral pact. Leaders from AB Party (Mojibur Rahman Monju) and RSA (Hasnat Quaiyum) were present.

On 30 December 2025, during a press conference announcing the NCP's participation in a new 11-party alliance led by Jamaat-e-Islami, Nahid Islam confirmed the dissolution of the Democratic Reform Alliance. The move marked a strategic shift for the NCP ahead of elections, ending the three-party coalition after less than a month.

== Goals ==
The alliance aimed to advance democratic reforms, national dignity, and economic liberation in line with aspirations from the July Revolution.

== Former member parties ==
Party	Logo	Symbol	Leader	Ideology	Position	Seats in Parliament
National Citizen Party			Nahid Islam	Reformism; Third way; Pluralism	Centre	Parliament dissolved
Amar Bangladesh Party			Mojibur Rahman Monju	Reformism	—N/a	Parliament dissolved
Rashtra Sanskar Andolan			Hasnat Quaiyum	Reformism	—N/a	Parliament dissolved

== See also ==
- Like-minded 11 Parties
