= 2026–2027 Bangladeshi local elections =

- 12 November 2026 – 27 May 2027

4,580 union parishads; 500 upazila parishads; 329 municipal corporations (pourashavas); 61 zila parishads; 13 city corporations
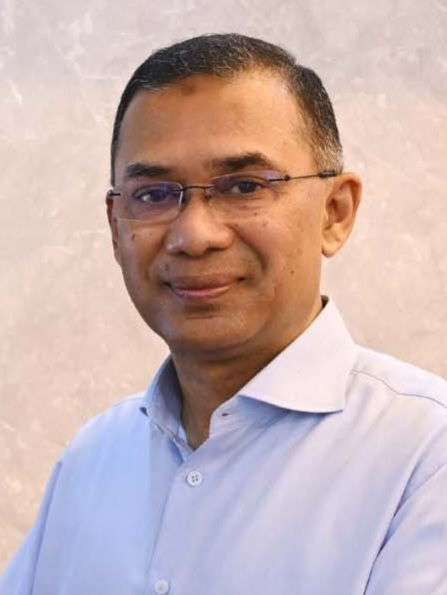

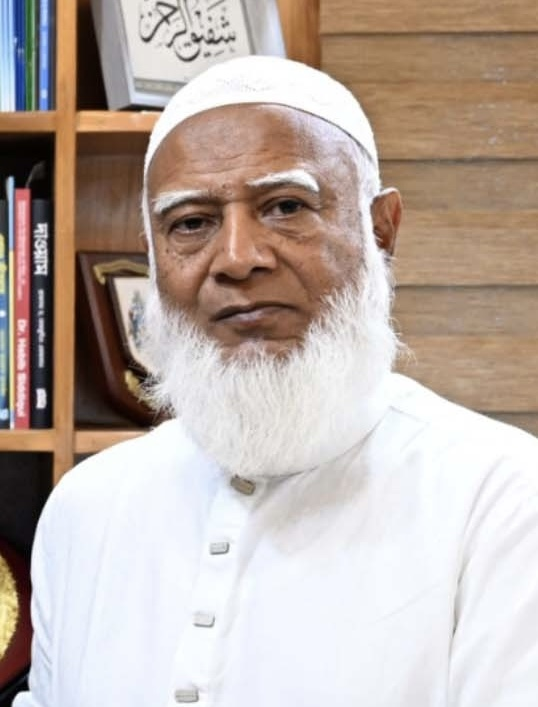

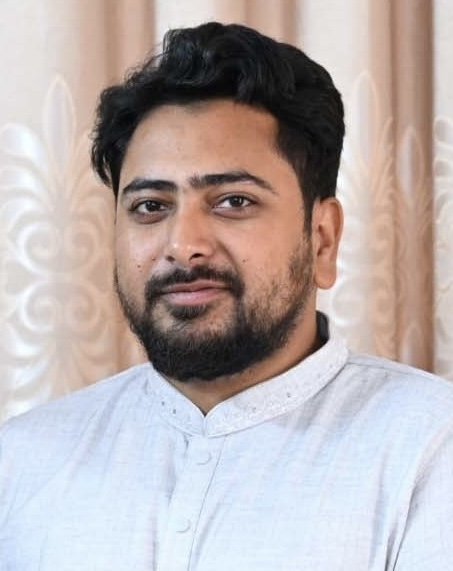
	First party	Second party	Third party
Leader	Tarique Rahman	Shafiqur Rahman	Nahid Islam
Party	BNP	Jamaat	NCP
Leader since	9 January 2026	12 November 2019	28 February 2025

Local elections in Bangladesh are scheduled to be held in phases between November 2026 and mid-2027, covering five tiers of local government: union parishads, upazila parishads, municipal corporations (pourashavas), zila parishads, and city corporations. The Election Commission (EC) announced on 14 September 2026 that union parishad elections, the first tier to go to the polls, will be held in seven phases beginning 12 November 2026, with the process expected to run through most of 2027.

These will be the first local government elections held since the BNP, led by Tarique Rahman, took office following its landslide victory in the February 2026 general election, and the first nationwide local polls since the fall of the Awami League government in the 2024 July Uprising.

== Background ==
Following the fall of the Awami League government in a popular mass uprising in 2024, most local government offices across the country were dissolved and vacant posts filled by government-appointed administrators. Political parties including Jamaat-e-Islami and the newly formed National Citizen Party (NCP) pushed for local government elections to be held before national elections, but the BNP opposed the sequencing, and local elections were ultimately not held before the 2026 Bangladeshi general election, in which the BNP won a two-thirds majority.

After forming a government, the BNP administration pledged to hold local body elections as soon as possible. In May 2026, LGRD State Minister Mir Shahe Alam said the government intended to begin a phased rollout of local elections after the monsoon season, aiming to complete elections for all five tiers within about a year, with the sequence determined largely by budget availability. He estimated union parishad elections alone would cost around Tk 500–600 crore, with the necessary allocation to be included in the 2026–27 national budget.

Preparations continued through the summer. In July 2026, Prime Minister's Adviser on Information and Broadcasting Zahed Ur Rahman said the EC had prepared preliminary roadmaps for separate elections to union parishads, upazila parishads, municipalities, and city corporations, with the process expected to begin with union parishads in haor and northeastern regions and to take 10–12 months to complete once started. Election Commissioner Abdur Rahmanel Masud said the EC was targeting an October start, noting that more than 4,500 of the country's union parishads had completed the necessary preparatory work and were ready for polling. Under the Local Government (Union Parishad) Act, authorities are required to hold the next union parishad election within the 180 days preceding the expiry of a council's five-year term, calculated from the date of its first meeting; the previous round of union parishad elections began in June 2021.

By early September, Election Commissioner Md Anwarul Islam Sarker confirmed local elections would begin with union parishad polls, with a detailed roadmap to follow within the month.

=== Exclusion of the Awami League ===
The Awami League, in power from 2009 to 2024 under Sheikh Hasina, had its activities formally banned by the interim government in May 2025 pending trials at the International Crimes Tribunal, and the Election Commission suspended its registration as a political party. The party was consequently barred from contesting the February 2026 general election, and LGRD State Minister Mir Shahe Alam has said the same ban applies to the local government elections, stating that as a banned organisation the Awami League "has no right to participate in any political programme in Bangladesh, let alone run in elections."

== Schedule ==
On 14 September 2026, Election Commissioner Brig Gen (retd) Abul Fazal Md Sanaullah announced a tentative schedule under which union parishad elections,covering 4,580 parishads nationwide, will be held in seven phases between November 2026 and May 2027. Sanaullah said elections needed to be held swiftly for 4,272 of the parishads because of a legal requirement to hold polls within 180 days of a term's expiry, and that the commission would aim to complete elections in most union parishads within the first five phases. The first phase will cover roughly 80 upazilas in 63 of the country's 64 districts (excluding Thakurgaon, where a separate by-election is underway), prioritising district sadar upazilas. The EC said it would hold discussions with all registered political parties over three days (23 to 25 September 2026) to help ensure the vote is conducted to a standard comparable to the 2026 national election.

Tentative union parishad election schedule
Phase	Date	Notes
1st	12 November 2026	~80 upazilas across 63 districts (Thakurgaon excluded)
2nd	13 December 2026	
3rd	30 December 2026	
4th	17 January 2027	
5th	4 February 2027	
6th	22 April 2027	
7th	27 May 2027	

Elections for upazila parishads, municipal corporations (pourashavas), zila parishads, and the 13 city corporations including the newly created Bogura City Corporation are to follow once the union parishad phases reach an advanced stage, with the government aiming to complete all five tiers within roughly a year of the process beginning. The Election Commission has said it prefers to hold most local elections during the November to April dry season, avoiding major religious festivals such as Puja, Eid, and Ramadan when finalising phase dates.

== Political context ==
The elections will be the first local polls since the BNP's landslide win in the February 2026 general election, in which the party took 209 of 300 contested seats against 68 for Jamaat-e-Islami and 6 for the NCP, the latter two contesting as part of an 11-party alliance. Jamaat and the NCP, which had pushed for local elections to precede the national vote, are expected to contest strongly at the grassroots level, where Jamaat in particular made significant gains in February. On 14 September National Citizen Party declared its candidates for the position of mayor in Dhaka. The names of Asif Mahmud and Nasiruddin Patwary Patwari were declared as the candidates for Dhaka North and South respectively by the party convener Nahid Islam in a exchange meeting. A day later, Jamaat declared Shadik Kayem as its mayoral candidate for Dhaka South and Mohammad Salim Al-Din its cadidate for Dhaka North.

== See also ==
- 2026 Bangladeshi general election
- 2024–2029 Bangladeshi local elections
- Local government in Bangladesh
