= Sirta Union =

Sirta Union সিরতা ইউনিয়ন
- Union
- Location in Bangladesh
- Country: Bangladesh
- Division: Mymensingh Division
- District: Mymensingh District
- Upazila: Mymensingh Sadar Upazila

Government
  - Type: Union council

Population (2001)
  - Total: 31,485
- Time zone: UTC+6 (BST)
- Website: sirtaup.mymensingh.gov.bd

Sirta Union (Bengali: সিরতা ইউনিয়ন) is a union parishad in Mymensingh Sadar Upazila of Mymensingh District, in Mymensingh Division, Bangladesh. It has an area of 7357 acres.

== Demographics ==
As of the 2001 census, the union had a population of 31,485.
