= AFM Solaiman Chowdhury =

Bangladeshi politician And Former civil servant

- এ এফ এম সোলায়মান চৌধুরী

Secretary of the Ministry of Textiles and Jute Secretary of the Ministry of Public Administration
- In office 9 January 2006 – 18 June 2006
- In office 12 September 2006 – 29 October 2006

Personal details
- Born: 1 January 1950 (age 76) Fenua, Monohorgonj, Comilla District
- Party: Amar Bangladesh Party (Until 2025)
- Other political affiliations: Bangladesh Jamaat-e-Islami (2009-2019; 2025)
- Education: University of Chittagong; University of Science and Technology Chittagong

AFM Solaiman Chowdhury is a former civil servant in Bangladesh. He is a former chairman of the National Board of Revenue. Prior to that, he was the Secretary, Ministry of Textiles and Jute and Ministry of Public Administration.

== Early life ==
AFM Solaiman Chowdhury was born on 1 January 1950 in Comilla District.

== Career ==
AFM Solaiman Chowdhury is a member of Bangladesh Administrative Service and Bangladesh Civil Service regular batch and has served important positions in field administration. Joining the government service, he has held various responsibilities including Chief executive officer Dhaka City Corporation, Secretary of Chittagong City Corporation, Chairman of Bangladesh Jute Mills Corporation, Chairman of Chittagong WASA, Chairman of Janata Bank, Chairman of Bangladesh Petroleum Corporation, Secretary to the President of Bangladesh.

He was the Deputy Commissioner of Kurigram DistrictFeni District. After 2006, he retired as Secretary to the Ministry of Public Administration and most recently as Chairman of the National Board of Revenue. After retiring from the post of secretary, he rejoined Jamaat-e-Islami in 2009.

He was a member of the Shura in Jamaat-e-Islami and was the chairman of the National Professional Forum, an organization of party professionals. After retiring from the post of secretary, he joined Jamaat-e-Islami. On 10 December 2019, he resigned from Bangladesh Jamaat-e-Islami.

He was announced as the convener of a new political party called Amar Bangladesh Party (AB Party) which was launched on 2 May 2020.
