= Bangladesh Development Party =

Bangladeshi political party

Bangladesh Development Party বাংলাদেশ ডেভেলপমেন্ট পার্টি
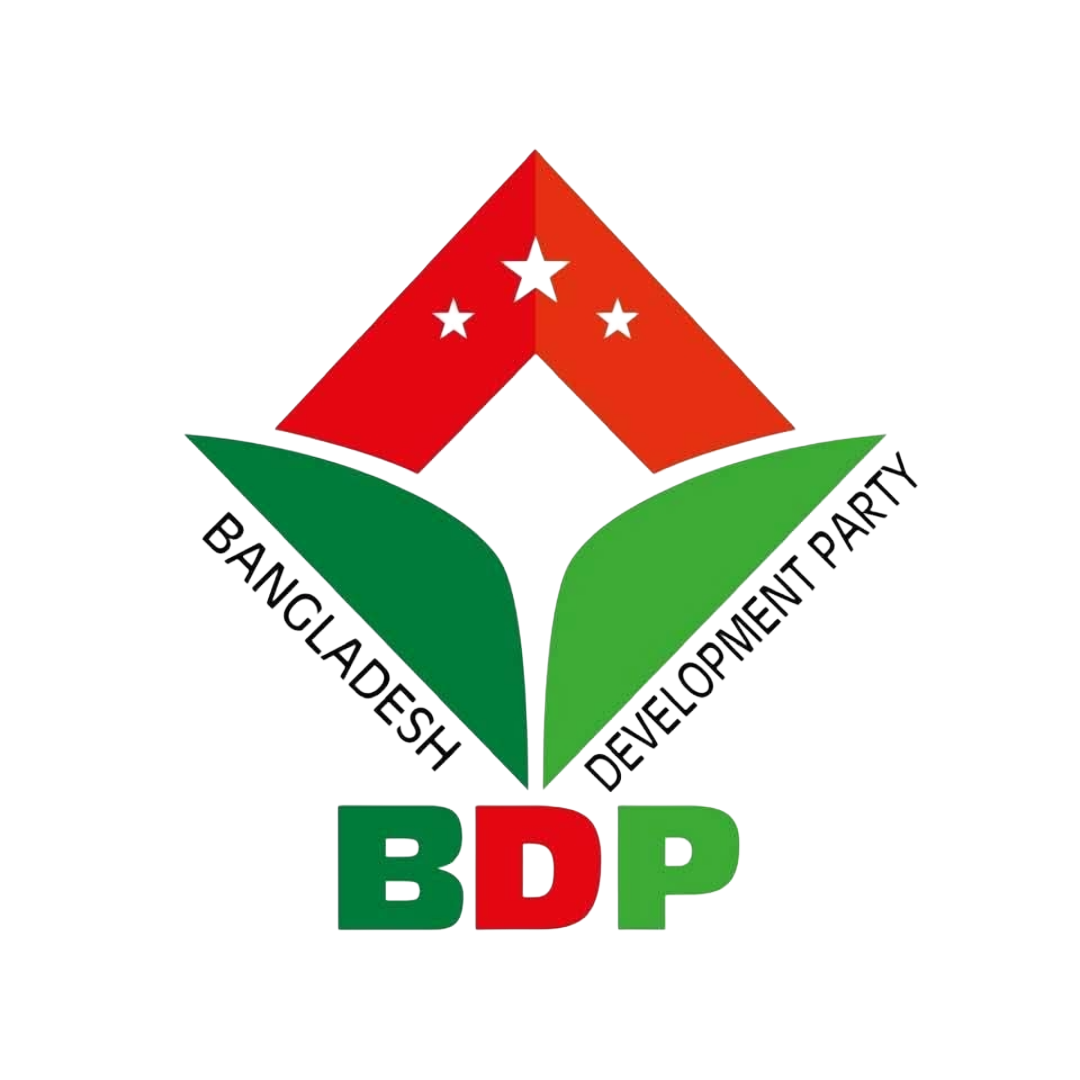
- Abbreviation: BDP
- Leader: AKM Anwarul Islam Chan
- Secretary: Muhammad Nizamul Haque
- Founded: 26 October 2022 (4 years ago)
- Registered: 2 February 2025
- Split from: Bangladesh Jamaat-e-Islami
- Headquarters: Resourceful Paltan City 51-51/A, 604, Purana Paltan, Dhaka
- Ideology: Conservatism (Bangladeshi); Islamic democracy
- Political position: Centre-right
- National affiliation: 11 Party Alliance
- Colors: Green
- Jatiya Sangsad: 0 / 350

Election symbol
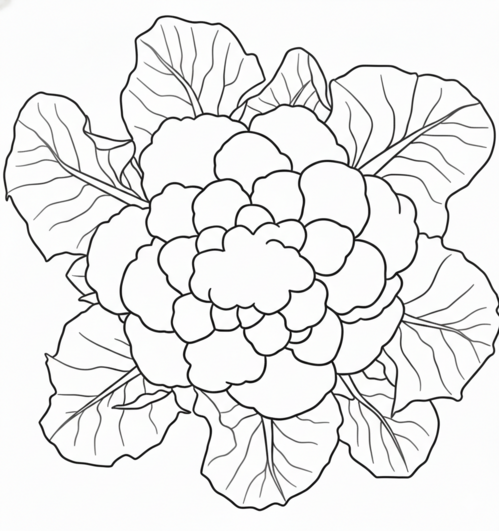
- Cauliflower

Party flag
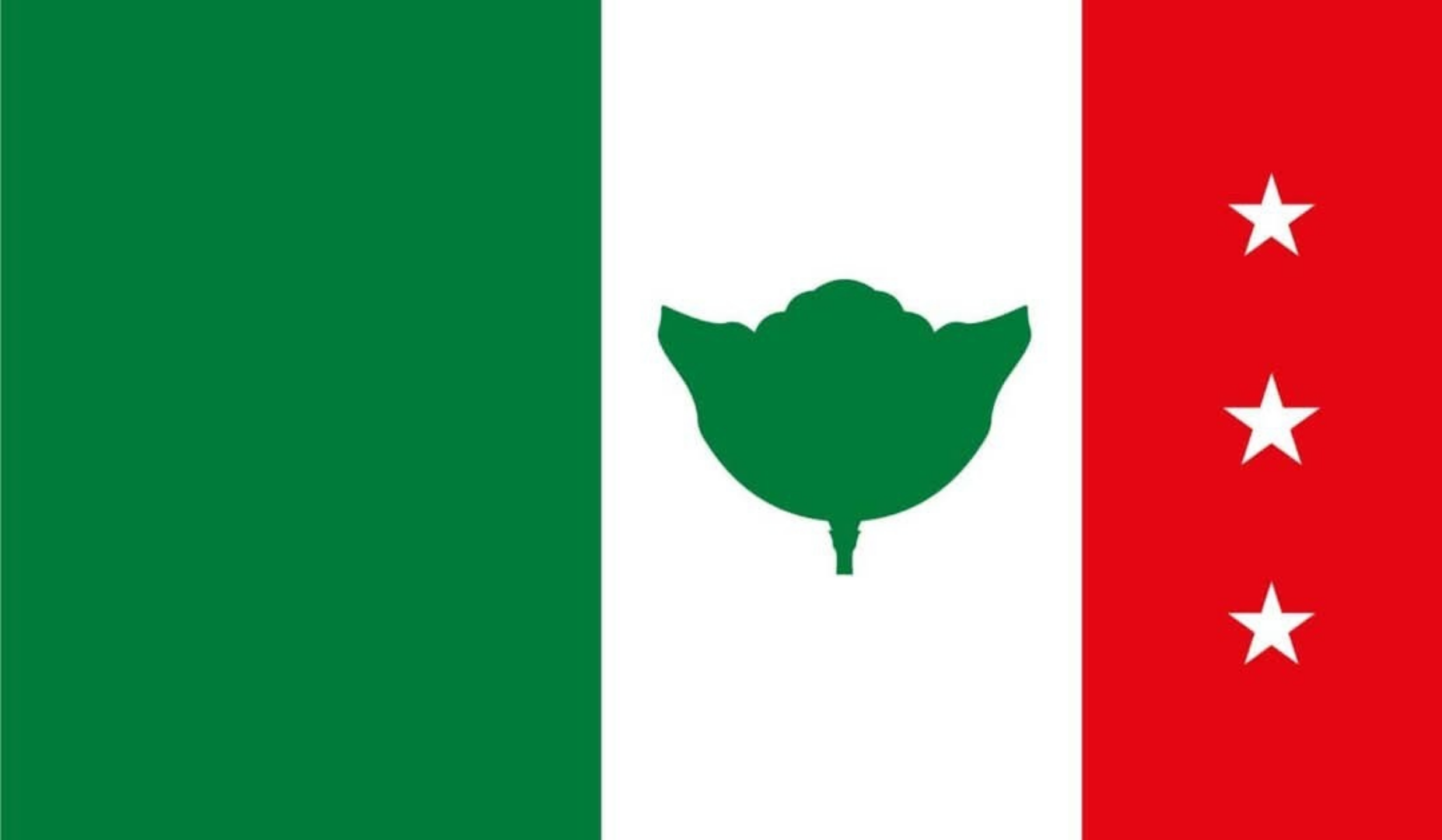

Website
- developmentparty.org

Bangladesh Development Party (Bengali: বাংলাদেশ ডেভেলপমেন্ট পার্টি, lit. 'Bangladesh Development Party'; BDP) is a political party in Bangladesh founded in October 2022 by former members of Bangladesh Jamaat-e-Islami. The party aligns with the Jamaat-led 11 Party Alliance.

== History ==
The party was initially founded in 2022.

BDP applied for registration as an political organization on 26 October 2022 but the request was rejected by the Bangladesh Election Commission in April 2023. Several BDP members and leaders were allegedly affiliated with Jamaat-e-Islami and its student wing Islami Chhatra Shibir, although the BDP denied having any connections with Jamaat or Shibir.

In December 2024, the Bangladesh High Court delivered a verdict requesting that the Election Commission register the BDP as a political party.

BDP finally was registered as an political party on 3 February 2025 with a cauliflower as its symbol.

== Election results ==
=== Jatiya Sangsad elections ===
Election	Party leader	Votes	%	Seats	+/–	Position	Outcome
2026	Anwarul Islam Chan	128,519	0.17%	0 / 350	New		Opposition
