= Bangladesh Minority Janata Party =

Political party in Bangladesh

Bangladesh Minority Janata Party বাংলাদেশ মাইনরিটি জনতা পার্টি
- Abbreviation: BMJP
- President: Sukriti Kumar Mondal
- Secretary-General: Dilip Kumar Das
- Founded: 2017
- Headquarters: Dhaka
- Ideology: Secularism (Bangladeshi); Minority interests
- Slogan: নির্যাতিত, নিপীড়িত, শোষিত ও অধিকার বঞ্চিত মানুষ মাত্রই - মাইনরিটি ("Only oppressed, persecuted, exploited and deprived people are minority")
- Bangladesh Parliament: 0 / 350

Website
- https://bmjpbd.org/

The Bangladesh Minority Janata Party (BMJP, Bengali: বাংলাদেশ মাইনরিটি জনতা পার্টি) is a political party in Bangladesh, formed in 2017 with the aim of establishing the rights of all — social, religious, economic, and political — while addressing the discrimination faced by the country's religious minority communities.

The party is headquartered in Dhaka. It states that its principles are "Assertiveness on democracy, secularism alongside freedom of all religions, establishment of non-communal political spirit and socialism so called absorption free society and social fair justice."

The party received its registration from the Bangladesh Election Commission on 9 April 2025. The electoral symbol of the Bangladesh Minority Janata Party is a rocket, and its slogan is "joy to win the humanity". The Bangladesh Minority Janata Party is the first political party registered with the Election Commission that focuses on Hindu rights.

Reporters from Prothom Alo and Bangla Tribune have noted that the BJMP was formed at the same time as the Bangladesh Janata Party.

== History ==
The BMJP was launched in 2017 by a group of 101 core members at an event at the National Press Club. At the event, party leaders called for government policies to protect minorities and increase communal harmony, including reintroducing the 1971 constitution, proportionate representation of minorities at the state level, the complete implementation of the Chittagong Hill Tracts Peace Agreement, and socioeconomic development of underprivileged communities. The party also announced that it planned to contest 300 seats in the upcoming elections.

At the end of 2017, the BMJP was one of 76 political parties that applied to Bangladesh's Election Commission seeking official registration.

In 2026 Bangladesh general elections, the party secured 0.01% vote share.

== See also ==
- Politics of Bangladesh
- List of political parties in Bangladesh
