= Abdul Hye Mashreki =

Folk Litterateur and Poet in Bangladesh

- আবদুল হাই মাশরেকী
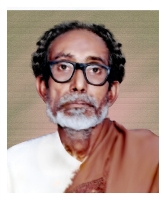
- Born: 1 April 1919; Mymensingh, Bengal Presidency, British India
- Died: 4 December 1988 (aged 69); Mymensingh, Bangladesh
- Education: Ananda Mohan College
- Occupations: Poet, lyricist, playwright, narrator
- Notable work: Used local wordings in Bengali poems for the first time
- Awards: Greater Mymensingh Literature Award, Provati Ekushe Award

Abdul Hye Mashreki (1 April 1919 – 4 December 1988) was a Bangladeshi folk litterateur and poet. He is known for his writing in the 1930s and 1940s. He mainly focused the lifestyle of the rural people of Bengal. Some notable works of him include Rakhal Bondhu, Jarina Sundari, Allah Megh De Chaya De, Fande Poriya Boga Kande Re, Amar Kakher Kolshi, He Amar Desh and Kichu Rekhe Jete Chai.

Mashreki wrote against the social, economical, religious and racial discrimination in the rural area. Mihir Acarya, researcher of Bengali literature named three main folk poets – Mashreki, Jasimuddin and Bande Ali Mia – in his research in the time period of 1917 to 1936.

== Birth and education ==
Mashreki was born in the village of Kakonhati of Ishwarganj Upazila in Mymensingh District on 1 April 1919 in his maternal uncle's house His father Osman Gani was an active worker of the movement against Jamindar and his mother was Rahima Khatun. Earlier of his education, he studied intermediate education at Ananda Mohan College of Mymensingh. Later, he moved on to Kolkata.

== Works ==
Poetry

- Kichu Rekhe Jete Chai
- He Amar Desh
- Mather Kobita Mather Gaan
- Vatiyali
- Ovishopter Bani
- Desh Desh Nondita
- Kal Nirobodhi
- Hazrat Abu Bakr (R.A)
- Swadesher Proti Hazrat Muhammad (Sm)
- Hutum Vutum Ratri

Story

- Kulsum
- Baul Moner Naksha
- Manush O Lash
- Nodee Vange

Drama

- Notun Gayer Kahini
- Sanko

Pala Gaan

- Rakhal Bondhu
- Jarina Sundari

Jari Gaan

- Dukhu Miar Jari

Others

- Dal Dhoriya Nuyaiya Konnya
- Akash Keno Nil
