= Bhabkhali Union =

Bhabkhali Union ভাবখালী ইউনিয়ন
- Union
- Location in Bangladesh
- Coordinates: 24.6687°N 90.4375°E
- Country: Bangladesh
- Division: Mymensingh Division
- District: Mymensingh District
- Upazila: Mymensingh Sadar Upazila

Government
  - Type: Union council

Population (2001)
  - Total: 43,467
- Time zone: UTC+6 (BST)
- Website: vabokhaliup.mymensingh.gov.bd

Bhabkhali Union (Bengali: ভাবখালী ইউনিয়ন) is a union parishad in Mymensingh Sadar Upazila of Mymensingh District, in Mymensingh Division, Bangladesh. It has an area of 7771 acres.

== Demographics ==
As of the 2001 census, the union had a population of 43,467.
