= Dapunia Union =

Dapunia Union দাপুনিয়া ইউনিয়ন
- Union
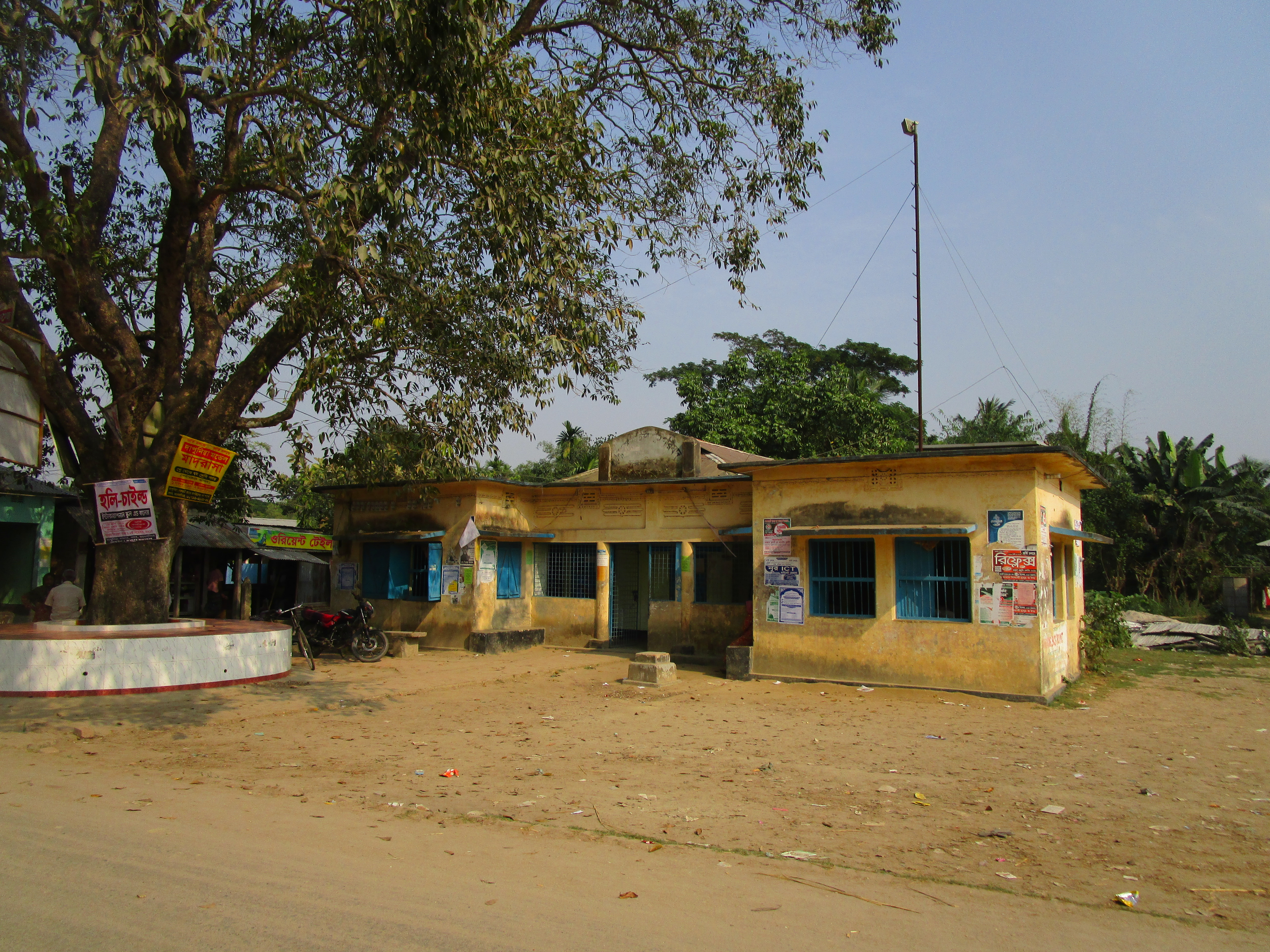
- Dapunia Union Parishad

- Location in Bangladesh
- Coordinates: 24.7203°N 90.3575°E
- Country: Bangladesh
- Division: Mymensingh Division
- District: Mymensingh District
- Upazila: Mymensingh Sadar Upazila

Government
  - Type: Union council

Population (2001)
  - Total: 41,690
- Time zone: UTC+6 (BST)
- Website: dapuniaup.mymensingh.gov.bd

Dapunia Union (Bengali: দাপুনিয়া ইউনিয়ন) is a union parishad in Mymensingh Sadar Upazila of Mymensingh District, in Mymensingh Division, Bangladesh. It has an area of 7268 acres.

== Demographics ==
As of the 2001 census, the union had a population of 41,690.
