= Prabodh Chandra Goswami =

Indian school teacher

Prabodh Chandra Goswami (1911–1984) was an Indian school teacher who worked in Jenkins School, Cooch Behar from 1951 to 1971. He was one of the most competent Mathematics teachers in the school during that period and also taught other subjects such as English, Bengali and Sanskrit.

He graduated with Mathematics in 1933 from Ananda Mohan College, then a part of the University of Calcutta. His batchmate and good friend during his college days included famous magician P. C. Sorcar.

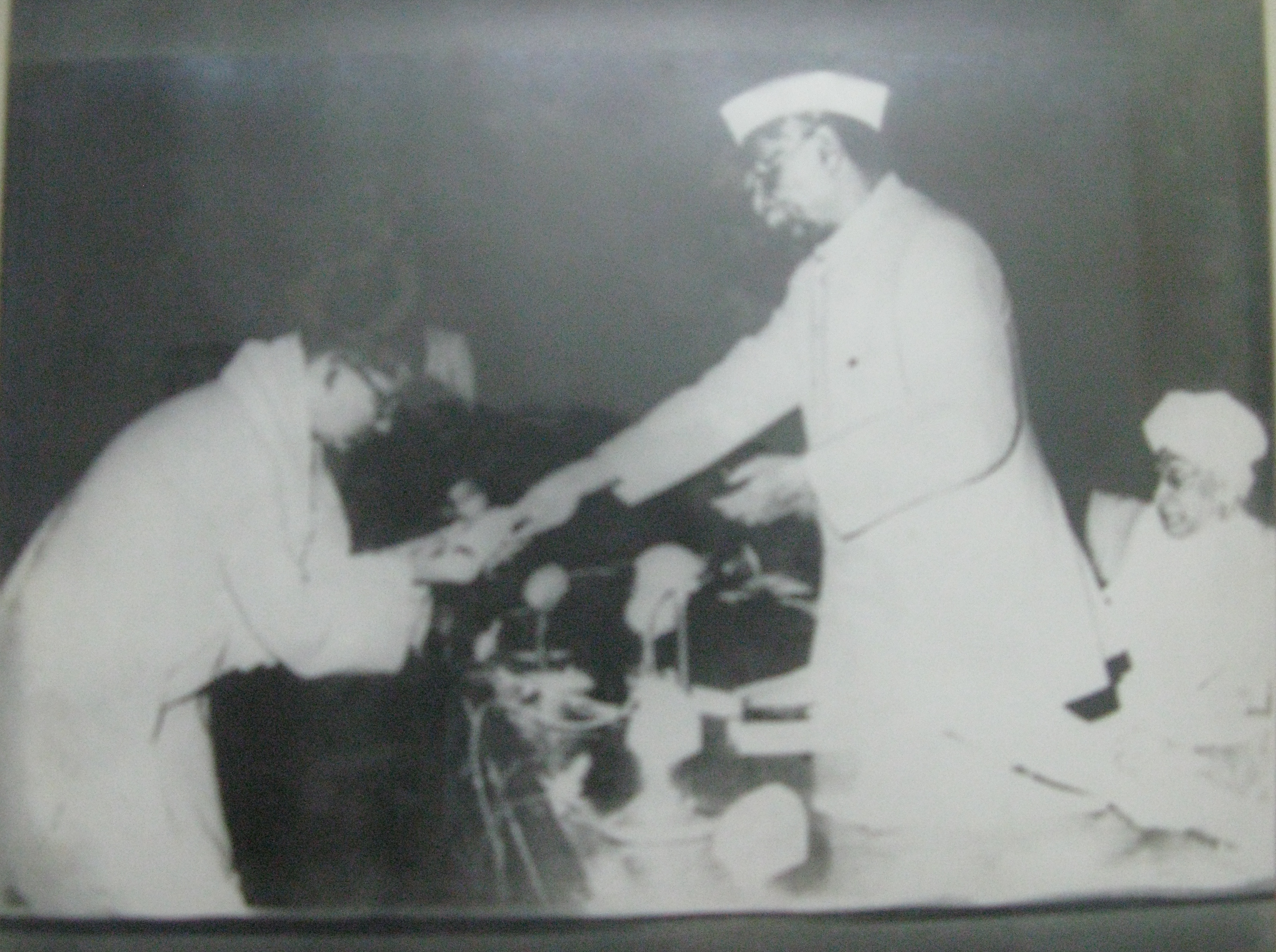
Receiving award from Dr.Rajendra Prasad in 1958

In 1958, he was awarded the National Award for Teachers, an award for teaching excellence introduced in India in the same year. Winning this award put Goswami and Jenkins School to limelight within the educational map of West Bengal.

He went on to make significant contributions to the educational scenario in Cooch Behar. His contributions included playing a prominent part in the setting up of Cooch Behar Government Polytechnic College in 1964, and carrying out initial teaching responsibilities there. He was the secretary of New Town Girls Higher Secondary School, a Cooch Behar-based girls’ high school. He was a member of the governing body of Nitya Nanda Chatushpathi, an educational institute founded to promote the learning of Sanskrit.
