= NM Ziaul Alam =

N M Ziaul Alam
- Education: University of Chittagong; BRAC University
- Occupation: Government official

NM Ziaul Alam is a retired senior secretary of the Information and Communication Technology Division under Zunaid Ahmed Palak, State Minister for Information and Communication Technology. He is a former Secretary of Coordination and Planning of the Cabinet Division.

== Career ==
Alam joined the Bangladesh Civil Service in 1984.

Alam was appointed the Deputy Commissioner of Khulna District in August 2008. He was promoted to additional secretary in September 2009. He later served as the Director General of the Department of Immigration & Passports.

Alam served as the Secretary of Coordination and Planning of the Cabinet Division from December 2015 to January 2019. He briefly served as the acting secretary of the Cabinet Division. He was promoted to full secretary in June 2016. He worked on renaming five districts and establishing Mymensingh City Corporation per the recommendations of the National Implementation Committee for Administrative Reforms/ Reorganisation led by Prime Minister Sheikh Hasina.

In 2019, Alam was appointed the secretary of the Information and Communication Technology Division and promoted to senior secretary. He oversaw the launch of Shuroksha, a COVID-19 vaccine registration app. His tenure was contractually extended for two years in January 2021. He cancelled a number of events of the ministry to save costs in 2022. He oversaw the issuing of Certifying Authority license to Bangladesh Bank by the Controller of Certifying Authorities of the Information and Communication Technology Division.

After the fall of the Sheikh Hasina led Awami League government, a case of data theft of more than 110 million people from the National Identity Card database against Alam and 19 others plus 15 to 20 unnamed accused. The accused in the case include Zunaid Ahmed Palak, State Minister, Sajeeb Wazed Joy, Information and Communication Technology advisor to and son of Prime Minister Sheikh Hasina, Tareque M Barkatullah, Data Centre director, Lieutenant Colonel Rakibul Hasan, National Telecommunication Monitoring Center, Haider Ali, professor of the University of Dhaka, Muhammad Mahfuzul Islam, the former vice chancellor of the Canadian University of Bangladesh.

In March 2025, Alam was detained from Panchlaish Residential area by a team from Panchlaish Police Station and handed over to the Dhaka Metropolitan Police.
