= Mayor of Mymensingh =

- Incumbent; Rokonuzzaman Rokon since 14 March 2026
- Mymensingh City Corporation
- Style: Honourable (formal)
- Type: Council Leader
- Member of: Mymensingh City Corporation
- Seat: Nagar Bhaban, Mymensingh
- Appointer: Electorate of Mymensingh
- Term length: Five years, renewable
- Constituting instrument: The City Corporation act, 2009
- Inaugural holder: Ekramul Haque Titu
- Formation: 2 April 2018; 8 years ago
- Salary: ৳150000 (US$1,200) per month (incl. allowances)
- Website: mcc.gov.bd

The Mayor of Mymensingh is the chief elected executive of the Mymensingh City Corporation. The Mayor's office oversees civic services, manages public properties, and coordinates the functions of various government agencies within the city. In addition, the Mayor is responsible for enforcing city corporation regulations and state laws, thereby ensuring good governance and the sustainable development of Mymensingh.

The Mayor's office is located in Nagar Bhaban; it has jurisdiction over all 33 wards of Mymensingh City.

== List of officeholders ==
Political parties

- Bangladesh Awami League
- Bangladesh Nationalist Party

Other factions

- Independent

Status

- Acting Mayor and Administrator

No.	Portrait	Officeholder (birth–death)	Election	Term of office			Designation	Political party	Reference
No.	Portrait	Officeholder (birth–death)	Election	From	To	Period	Designation	Political party	Reference
1		Ekramul Haque Titu	2019; 2024	27 May 2019	19 August 2024	5 years, 84 days	Mayor	Bangladesh Awami League	
–		Umme Salma Tanzia	–	19 August 2024	8 November 2024	2 years, 51 days	Administrator	Independent	
–		Md. Mokhtar Ahmed	–	9 November 2024	14 March 2026	1 year, 125 days	Administrator	Independent	
–		Rukonuzzaman Rokon	–	14 March 2026	Incumbent	209 days	Administrator	Bangladesh Nationalist Party	

== Elections ==
=== Election result 2024 ===
Mymensingh Mayoral Election 2024
Party	Candidate	Votes	%	±%
AL	Ekramul Haque Titu	139,604	73.88	New
Independent	Sadequl Haque Khan Milki	35,763	18.93	New
Independent	Ehteshamul Alam	10,773	5.70	New
Independent	Md. Rezaul Haque	1,487	0.79	New
JP(E)	Shahidul Islam	1,321	0.70	New
Majority		103,841	55.00	New
Turnout		189,439	56.30	New
Registered electors		336,496		
AL hold				
