= Mymensingh Sadar Upazila =

Mymensingh Sadar ময়মনসিংহ সদর
- Upazila
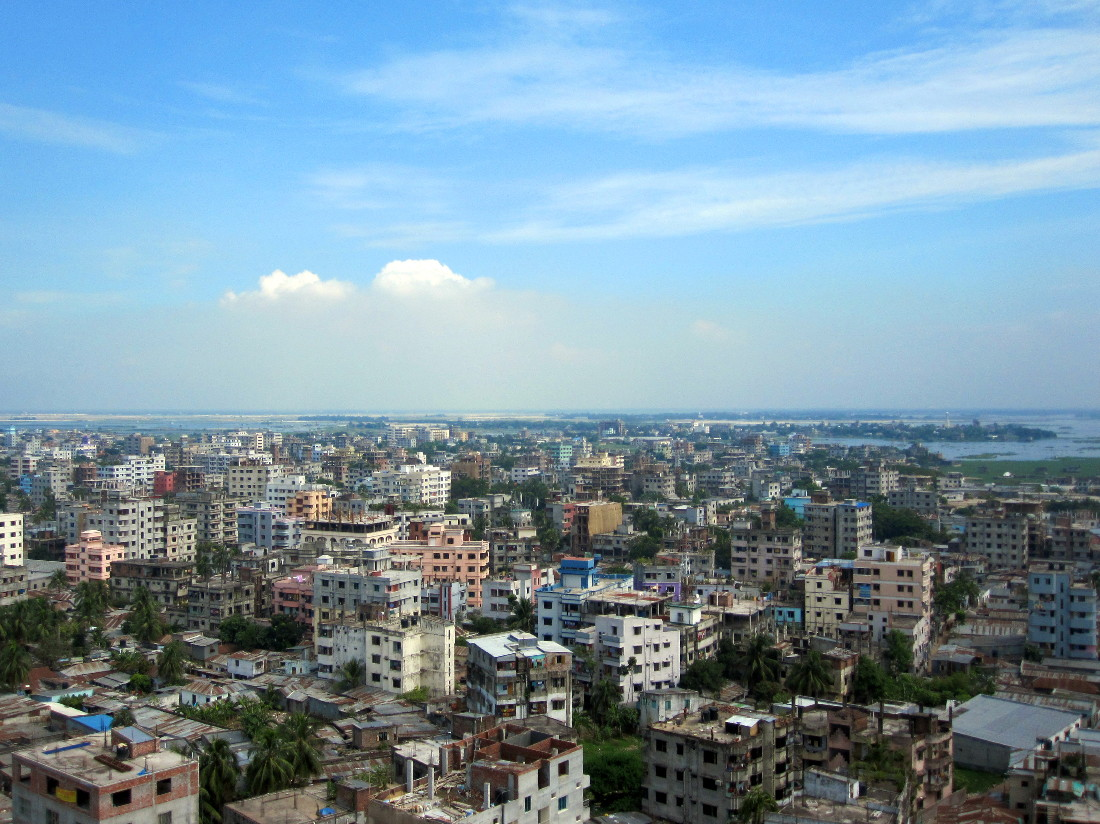
- Skyline of Mymensingh city

- Coordinates: 24°45′N 90°25′E
- Country: Bangladesh
- Division: Mymensingh
- District: Mymensingh
- Headquarters: Mymensingh

Area
  - Upazila: 380.72 km^{2} (147.00 sq mi)

Population (2022)
  - Upazila: 998,422
  - Density: 2,622.5/km^{2} (6,792.1/sq mi)
  - Metro: 576,927
- Time zone: UTC+6 (BST)
- Postal code: 2200
- Area code: 091
- Website: mymensinghsadar.mymensingh.gov.bd

Mymensingh Sadar Upazila mauza geocode map

Mymensingh Sadar (Bengali: ময়মনসিংহ সদর) is an upazila of Mymensingh District in the Division of Mymensingh, Bangladesh. Most of the area of this sadar upazila is now under the Mymensingh City Corporation.

== Geography ==
Mymensingh Sadar is located at 24.7500°N 90.4167°E. It has 167,472 units of household and its total area is 380.72 km^{2}. The River Brahmaputra just crosses the section of Mymensingh. A hundred plus years ago the river was widened 5–10 km and now it is a seasonal flow, not an ever-flowing river. A huge land recovered from this riverbed for a hundred years named 'chars' is a big part of Mymensingh and as it was riverine land regular seasonal flood water namely from the Garo hills of Meghalaya of India flash up to these chars. Flooding by seasonal reasons for refreshing fertility of land and a trend of native fishes add some protein budget assistance in these poor CHAR villages.

== Demographics ==
Religions in Mymensingh Sadar Upazila (2022)
Religion	Percent
Islam	95.1%
Hinduism	4.7%
Other or not stated	0.2%

According to the 2022 Bangladeshi census, Mymensingh Sadar Upazila had 99,609 households and a population of 421,422. 11.16% of the population were under 5 years of age. Mymensingh Sadar had a literacy rate (age 7 and over) of 67.54%: 68.60% for males and 66.53% for females, and a sex ratio of 97.52 males for 100 females. 58,371 (13.85%) lived in urban areas.

== Administration ==
Mymensingh Sadar Upazila is administratively divided into 12 union parishads, a change from the 13 unions recorded in 2011 due to the incorporation of the former Aqua Union into the Mymensingh City Corporation.

The current unions are:

- Austadhar
- Bhabkhali
- Bororchar
- Boyra
- Char Ishwardia
- Char Nilaxmia
- Dapunia
- Ghagra
- Khagdohor
- Kushtia
- Paranganj
- Sirta

The upazila is also composed of 136 mauzas and 175 villages. The administrative activities are coordinated through the Mymensingh Sadar Upazila Parishad.

== See also ==
- Upazilas of Bangladesh
- Districts of Bangladesh
- Divisions of Bangladesh
- Mymensingh
