= Prasit Bikash Khisa =

Political president of United People's Democratic Front

- প্রসিত বিকাশ খীসা

President of the United People's Democratic Front
- Incumbent
- Assumed office 26 December 1998
- General Secretary: Rabi Shankar Chakma
- Preceded by: office established

Personal details
- Born: Khagrachhari, East Pakistan now Bangladesh
- Party: United People's Democratic Front
- Known for: One of the founding members of UPDF

Military service
- Branch: Shanti Bahini
- Years of service: 1977–1997
- Battles/wars: Chittagong Hill Tracts conflict

Prasit Bikash Khisa is a political leader in the Chittagong Hill Tracts of Bangladesh. He is one of the founders and currently the president of United People's Democratic Front (UPDF), established in 1998. It is alleged that he opposed the 1997 peace agreement between the government and the Parbatya Chattogram Jana Sanghati Samiti (PCJSS), arguing that the deal failed to adequately safeguard the rights and autonomy of the indigenous people in the region.

== Political career ==
Under Khisa's leadership, the United People's Democratic Front has worked to support indigenous people's rights of Bangladesh. However, there have been many conflicts and divisions among different groups in the region. The United People's Democratic Front itself had a split in 2017 by which a new group called UPDF Democratic was formed.

Under the recent years, UPDF, led by Khisa, has been involved in violent incidents and conflicts with other groups. In February 2022, two members of the group were killed in an attack by gunmen in the Sajek area of Rangamati district. UPDF further accused the Parbatya Chattogram Jana Sanghati Samiti, led by Santu Larma, of carrying out the attack.

In June 2022, Khisa proposed a new peace accord for the Chittagong Hill Tracts (CHT) and reached out to the government through former Bangladeshi Army Major Emdadul Islam, who had previously played a significant role in the 1997 agreement.

== See also ==
- Chittagong Hill Tracts Peace Accord
- Chittagong Hill Tracts conflict
- Manabendra Narayan Larma
