= 11 Party Alliance =

Political alliance in Bangladesh

11 Party Alliance (Note: Despite the name, the alliance currently has 9 member parties.) ১১ দলীয় নির্বাচনী ঐক্য
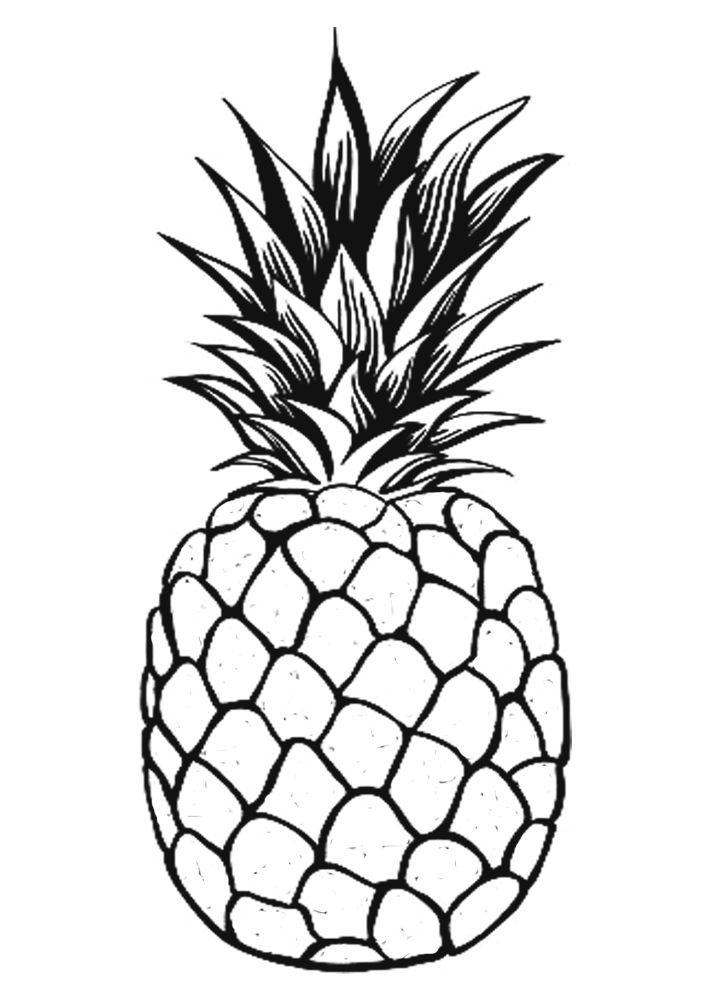
- ১১ দলীয় নির্বাচনী ঐক্য; 11 Party Alliance
- Leader: Shafiqur Rahman; Nahid Islam; Mamunul Haque; Sarwar Kamal Azizi; Anwarul Islam Chan; Tasmia Pradhan; Oli Ahmad; Mojibur Rahman Monju; Mustafizur Rahman Iran
- Founded: 19 October 2025; (as Like-minded 8 Parties); January 2026; (as 11 Party Alliance)
- Ideology: Majority: Islamism; Conservatism (Bangladeshi); Factions: Reformism; Bangladeshi nationalism
- Political position: Right-wing to far-right; Factions: Centre
- Member parties: Bangladesh Jamaat-e-Islami; National Citizen Party; Bangladesh Khelafat Majlis; Nizam-e-Islam Party; Bangladesh Development Party; Jatiya Ganotantrik Party; Liberal Democratic Party; Amar Bangladesh Party; Bangladesh Labour Party; Formerly: Bangladesh Khilafat Andolan; Islami Andolan Bangladesh; Khelafat Majlis
- Slogan: Bengali: ঐক্যবদ্ধ বাংলাদেশ; ("United Bangladesh")
- Jatiya Sangsad: 88 / 350

Website
- unitedbangladesh.org

The 11 Party Alliance (Bengali: ১১ দলীয় নির্বাচনী ঐক্য, lit. '11 Party Electoral Union'), also simply referred to as the 11 Parties, is a major right-wing to far-right electoral alliance in Bangladesh, primarily consisting of Islamist parties. The alliance is led by the Bangladesh Jamaat-e-Islami. The parties have competed in the 2026 general election, and won 77 seats. Currently, it consists of 9 members.

The alliance was established as Like-minded 8 Parties in October 2025 as an attempt of uniting the Islamist parties in the country. The eight parties campaigned and rallied for various demands, including the legal basis of the July Charter, a referendum before the election, proportional representation (PR) in the proposed upper house of Jatiya Sangsad, and ensuring a level playing field in the election. In late December, the National Citizen Party (NCP), the Liberal Democratic Party (LDP), and Amar Bangladesh Party (AB Party) joined the alliance making it an alliance of 11 parties. However, later in January 2026, the Islami Andolan Bangladesh (IAB) left reducing the number to 10, but then in the same month, the Bangladesh Labour Party (BLP) joined the alliance to bring the number of parties back to 11. Following the general election, the alliance experienced further departures with Bangladesh Khilafat Andolan and Khelafat Majlis, bringing the membership down to 9 parties.

== History ==
Following the July Uprising of 2024, the Jamaat-e-Islami has actively attempted to unite the Islamist parties of the country into a single alliance. Although some ideological disputes remained, top leaders of various Islamist parties expressed interest for creating a unified alliance of Islamists. The Jamaat-e-Islami also announced that it was liberal to provide maximum discount for the cause of alliance. The party started holding meetings with various political parties on 15 August 2024, including the Islami Andolan Bangladesh, the 12 Party Alliance, the Zaker Party, the Bangladesh Labour Party, the Khelafat Majlis, and the Faraizi Andolan. However, the issues of contention among the Islamic clerics over the religious views of the Jamaat-e-Islami founder Abul A'la Maududi became a hindrance for the party for forging an alliance. On 21 January 2025, Shafiqur Rahman, the party leader of the Jamaat-e-Islami, visited the durbar of Syed Rezaul Karim, the pir of Charmonai and leader of the Islami Andolan Bangladesh, in Barishal, and expressed optimism for the alliance of Islamists. Prominent Islamic scholars and leaders from various organizations, including Hefazat-e-Islam Bangladesh and Bangladesh Nizam-e-Islam Party, have formally endorsed the Bangladesh Nationalist Party (BNP) for the upcoming 13th National Parliamentary Election. The leaders expressed concerns over what they described as "extremist rhetoric" and instability linked to Jamaat-e-Islami, choosing to support the BNP to ensure national stability and inclusive governance. This endorsement highlights a significant shift in political alliances within the religious landscape of Bangladesh ahead of the 2026 election.

The Islami Andolan Bangladesh also withdrew from the alliance, expressing dissatisfaction with the seat agreement. The decision of the National Citizen Party (NCP) to ally with Jamaat-e-Islami caused significant internal friction. Dozens of prominent NCP members including Tasnim Jara resigned in protest. They argued that aligning with a party that opposed Bangladesh's independence in 1971 betrayed the spirit of the 2024 uprising. On 24 January, Bangladesh Labour Party joined the alliance making it 11 party again.

On the eve of the 2026 general elections, the Bangladesh Nationalist Party (BNP) formally lodged 127 complaints against Jamaat-e-Islami regarding various electoral irregularities.

In June 2026, Bangladesh Khilafat Andolan announced that it no longer considered itself part of the alliance after the electoral understanding had ended. It also asked the alliance not to use its name in future programmes. Ever since the departure, no representatives of the party have been seen attending meetings or programmes of the alliance.

On 25 July 2026, Khelafat Majlis left the alliance. The party leaders said the alliance was solely based on electoral terms. Nevertheless, Khilafat Majlis did participate in some programs organized by the 11-party alliance after the election before formally exiting, and vowed to act as a opposition in the parliament.

Following the departure of Bangladesh Khilafat Andolan and Khelafat Majlis, the remaining Qawmi-based parties within the alliance, specifically the Bangladesh Khelafat Majlis (not to be confused with Khelafat Majlis) and Nizam-e-Islam Party, faced increasing pressure to distance themselves from Jamaat-e-Islami. On 22 October 2026, both parties attended a meeting of seven Qawmi-based parties at Makhjanul Uloom Madrasa in Khilgaon, Dhaka, along with former alliance members such as Islami Andolan Bangladesh. During the meeting, leaders of Hefazat-e-Islam Bangladesh asked the Qawmi groups to leave the Jamaat-led coalition and pursue a joint local election strategy under the banner of "Like minded Islamic Parties," (Samomona Islami Dol) while retaining their separate identities, with a follow up meeting scheduled for 5 December 2026.

On 7 November 2026, Bangladesh Khelafat Majlis Ameer Mamunul Haque said that that Jamaat-e-Islami would bear responsibility if no seat-sharing deal was reached, while unilaterally announcing his own party's mayoral candidates for Dhaka North and Dhaka South.

== Five-point demands movement ==
On 11 November 2025, then eight parties organized a rally in Dhaka demanding five points, that include—

1. Legal basis of the July Charter
2. Holding referendum before the general election
3. Level playing field for a fair election
4. Visibility of the justice for the July massacre
5. Ban on activities of the Jatiya Party (Ershad) and the Grand Alliance (Bangladesh)

The parties thanked Chief Adviser Muhammad Yunus for issuing the July National Charter (Constitutional Amendment) Implementation Order, 2025, but denounced the decision to hold referendum alongside the general election. The parties declared joint programmes serially between 30 November and 6 December in all divisional towns to demand referendum before the election.

== Electoral Strategy ==
The parties have decided to compete under the "one box policy", meaning that the alliance will nominate a single candidate from an affiliated party to each constituencies, and other associated parties will not nominate anyone to the respective constituency. However, Sarwar Hossain Tushar, an 11 Party alliance candidate from NCP for the Narsingdi-2 constituency, has alleged that supporters of the Jamaat-e-Islami candidate are engaging in secret campaigning and "door-to-door" activities in violation of electoral codes. Tushar filed a formal complaint with the returning officer, claiming that these clandestine operations are intended to influence voters outside of the regulated campaigning hours and methods. He called for immediate intervention from the Election Commission to ensure a level playing field for all contestants. BNP leaders have alleged that Jamaat-e-Islami is transporting outsiders into Dhaka to cast fraudulent votes in an attempt to secure victory in the city's constituencies. The party claimed that these individuals are being housed in various secret locations to influence the election outcome. BNP has called on the Election Commission and law enforcement to take immediate action against such irregularities to ensure a fair voting process. On 5 February 2026, law enforcement agencies in Lakshmipur uncovered a major operation involving the production of illegal voting seals. A printing press owner confessed in court that he had manufactured fake ballot seals under the direct instructions of a local Jamaat-e-Islami leader. Police seized equipment and six fake seals intended for use on election day. Two polling agents representing Jamaat-e-Islami were sentenced to two years of rigorous imprisonment for illegally entering a polling center in Mirpur during the 2026 Bangladesh general election. The individuals were apprehended by law enforcement after failing to provide valid identification or authorization to be present within the facility. Following a summary trial conducted by an executive magistrate, they were convicted of violating electoral regulations and sent to jail. In Bogra, Nasirul Islam, the Ward 2 secretary for Jamaat-e-Islami, was detained by a mobile court for illegally entering the Bhandari Girls' High School polling center late at night.

== Current member parties ==
Party	Symbol	Flag	Leader	Ideology	Position	Seats in Jatiya Sangasd
Bangladesh Jamaat-e-Islami			Shafiqur Rahman	Islamism; Conservatism; Neo-Islamism; Reformism	Right-wing to far-right	76
National Citizen Party			Nahid Islam	Reformism; Third Way; Pluralism	Centre	8
Bangladesh Khelafat Majlis			Mamunul Haque	Islamism; Pan-Islamism; Caliphatism; Social conservatism; Deobandism	Far-right	3
Jatiya Ganotantrik Party			Tasmia Pradhan	Bangladeshi nationalism; Conservatism; Islamic democracy	Centre-right to right-wing	1
Nizam-e-Islam Party			Sarwar Kamal Azizi	Islamism; Islamic fundamentalism; Social conservatism; Deobandism	Far-right	0
Liberal Democratic Party			Oli Ahmed	Economic liberalism	Centre-right	0
Amar Bangladesh Party			Mojibur Rahman Monju	Reformism		0
Bangladesh Development Party			Anwarul Islam Chan	Conservatism; Islamic democracy	Centre-right	0
Bangladesh Labour Party			Mustafizur Rahman Iran	Bangladeshi nationalism	Centre	0

== Result ==
=== Jatiya Sangsad elections ===
Election	Leader	Votes	%	Seats	+/–	Position	Outcome
2026	Shafiqur Rahman	N/A		90 / 350	Boycotted	2nd	Opposition

=== Presidential elections ===
Election	Candidate	Votes	%	Result
2026	Oli Ahmed	88	25.66	Lost ✗

== See also ==
- Shadow cabinet of Bangladesh
- Democratic Reform Alliance
- 20 Party Alliance
- Islamic Democratic League
