= Amar Bangladesh Party =

Political party in Bangladesh

Amar Bangladesh Party আমার বাংলাদেশ পার্টি
- Abbreviation: AB Party (formal); ABP (informal)
- Chairman: Mojibur Rahman Monju
- General Secretary: Asaduzzaman Fuaad
- Founder: AFM Solaiman Chowdhury; Mojibur Rahman Bhuiyan Monju
- Founded: 2 May 2020 (6 years ago)
- Registered: 21 August 2024
- Split from: Bangladesh Jamaat-e-Islami
- Headquarters: Bijoynagar, Dhaka, Bangladesh
- Think tank: Jana Akankhar Bangladesh
- Student wing: Bangladesh Students' Party
- Youth wing: AB Jubo Party
- Women's wing: AB Party Women's Wing
- Ideology: Reformism
- National affiliation: 11 Party Alliance Former: Democratic Reform Alliance (2025)
- Colours: Gold
- Slogan: সাম্য, মানবিক মর্যাদা ও সামাজিক সুবিচার ("Equality, Human Dignity and Social Justice")
- Bangladesh Parliament: 0 / 350

Election symbol
- Eagle

Party flag
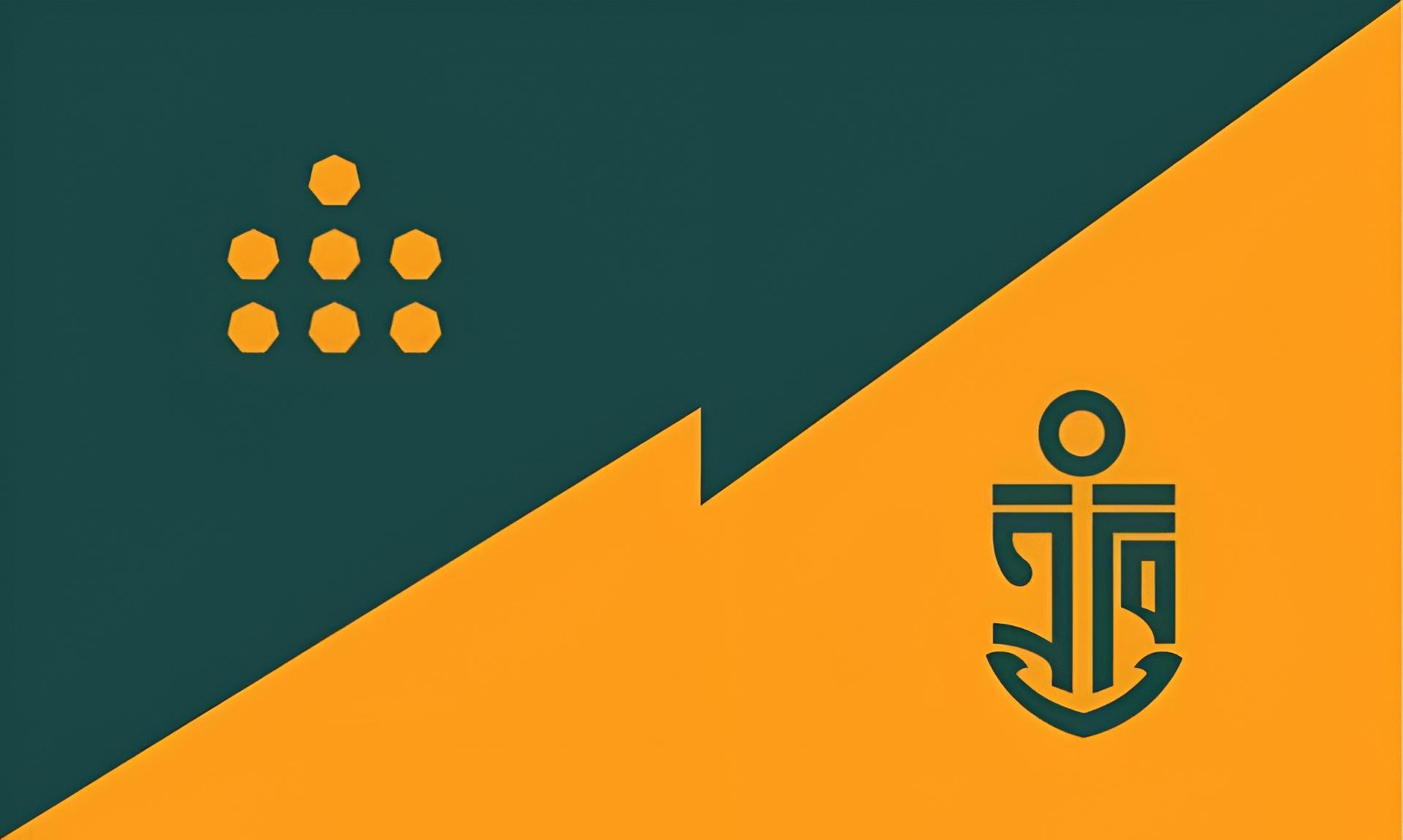

Website
- https://abparty.org/

Amar Bangladesh Party (Bengali: আমার বাংলাদেশ পার্টি, lit. 'My Bangladesh Party') is a political party in Bangladesh. The party was established on 2 May 2020 by a reformist splinter group of Bangladesh Jamaat-e-Islami. It is a member party of the 11 Party Alliance. The party has been described as far-right by political analyst such as Mubashar Hasan.

== History ==
In 2019, Barrister Abdur Razzaq, the then Assistant Secretary General of Jamaat-e-Islami, resigned from the party over the issue of Jamaat's demand for reforms and its stance on the Bangladesh Liberation War. Just hours after his resignation, Mujibur Rahman Bhuiyan Manju, a former Jamaat central Shura member and ex-president of Islami Chhatra Shibir, was expelled from the party. As a result, on April 27, a new political platform named "Jano Akangkhar Bangladesh" was launched under the leadership of Mujibur Rahman Bhuiyan Manju. This platform then transformed into the Amar Bangladesh Party in 2020. Later, Barrister Abdur Razzak also resigned from his position as the chief advisor of the AB Party.

The party witnessed a major split in October 2023 when several important leaders abruptly left the party and joined the Syed Muhammad Ibrahim-led Bangladesh Kalyan Party after the ABP decided not to take part in the 2024 general election. In 2023, it joined the Bangladesh Nationalist Party in a movement to demand the restoration of the caretaker government system.

During the July Uprising, AB Party claimed to have played active role in the fall of Sheikh Hasina's government. The party and its workers participated in the student led uprising.

The party applied for registration before the 2024 election and passed the primaries but failed to get registration in the end. In view of the judgment and order passed by the High Court on 19 August 2024, the party was registered under the provisions of Chapter 6 of the Representation of the People Order, 1972.

On the 11th of March 2025, the AB Party held its first central conference at Suhrawardy Udyan in Dhaka. Mujibur Rahman Bhuiyan Manju was elected as the party's chairman during the conference with 1,400 votes. Asaduzzaman Fuad was elected unopposed as the General Secretary for a three-year period. Additionally, 21 executive committee members were also announced.

== Election results ==
=== Jatiya Sangsad elections ===
Election	Party leader	Votes	%	Seats	+/–	Position	Outcome
2026	Mojibur Rahman Monju	210,562	0.28%	0 / 350	New		Opposition
