= Parbatya Chattagram Jana Samhati Samiti (MN Larma) =

Political party in Bangladesh

Parbatya Chattagram Jana Samhati Samiti (MN Larma) পার্বত্য চট্টগ্রাম জনসংহতি সমিতি (এম এন লারমা)
- Abbreviation: PCJSS-MN Larma
- Leader: Juddho Chakma, Shaktiman Chakma, Ratan Sen Tanchangya and others
- General Secretary: Ubamong Marma
- Founded: 2007
- Split from: PCJSS
- Headquarters: Chittagong Hill Tracts, Chittagong
- Ideology: Autonomism

Party flag
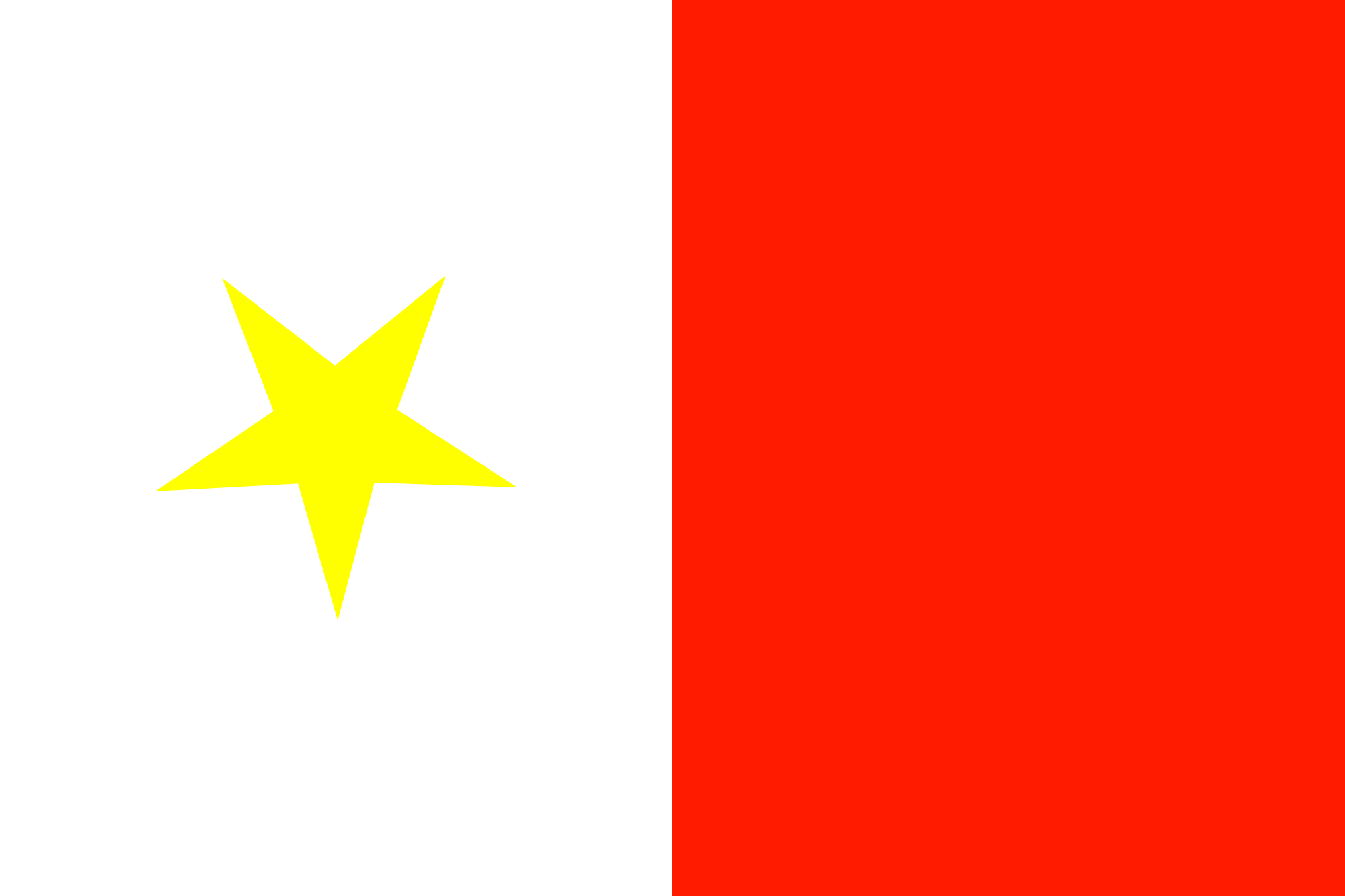

The Parbatya Chattagram Jana Samhati Samiti (MN Larma) (Bengali: পার্বত্য চট্টগ্রাম জনসংহতি সমিতি (এম এন লারমা); United People's Party of the Chittagong Hill Tracts (MN Larma); abbreviated PCJSS-MN Larma), also known as the Jana Samhati Samiti (MN Larma) and JSS-MN Larma, is a regional political party and militant organization in the Chittagong Hill Tracts of Chittagong, Bangladesh. PCJSS-MN Larma is named after M. N. Larma, the founding leader of PCJSS. Whilst the PCJSS demands the full implementation of the 1997 Chittagong Hill Tracts Peace Accord, the PCJSS-MN Larma still demands autonomy for the Chittagong Hill Tracts. They are allegedly allied to UPDF (Democratic).

== History ==
The Parbatya Chattagram Jana Samhati Samiti (MN Larma) would be formed in 2007 by a group of reformists during the 2007-2008 military-backed caretaker government of Bangladesh.

On 3 May 2018, at Naniarchar Upazila, Rangamati, the vice president of the PCJSS-MN Larma, Shaktiman Chakma, would be shot at indiscriminately by three unidentified assailants who were allegedly members of the United People's Democratic Front (UPDF) while he was getting off from his motorcycle. He would later die from wounds.

On 28 May 2018, three members of the United People's Democratic Front (UPDF) would be gunned down by unidentified assailants in Korolyachhari, Baghaichhari Upazila. The United People's Democratic Front would blame the attack on the PCJSS-MN Larma and the United People's Democratic Front (Democratic).

On 7 July 2020, six members of the PCJSS-MN Larma would be shot dead by unidentified assailants in Bandarban. Ubamong Marma, the general secretary of Bandarban District Committee of the PCJSS-MN Larma, would blame the killings on the original PCJSS.

== See also ==
- Chittagong Hill Tracts conflict
- Shantu Larma
- M. N. Larma
- Parbatya Chattagram Jana Samhati Samiti
