= United People's Democratic Front (Democratic) =

United People's Democratic Front (Democratic) ইউনাইটেড পিপলস ডেমোক্রেটিক ফ্রন্ট (গণতান্ত্রিক)
- Abbreviation: UPDF-D
- Founder: Tapan Jyoti Chakma
- Founded: November 15, 2017
- Split from: United People's Democratic Front
- Headquarters: Rangamati, Chittagong Hill Tracts, Bangladesh
- Ideology: Autonomism
- Bangladesh Parliament: 0 / 350

Party flag

The United People's Democratic Front (Democratic) (abbreviated as UPDF-D; Bengali: ইউনাইটেড পিপলস ডেমোক্রেটিক ফ্রন্ট (গণতান্ত্রিক), also referred to as the United People's Democratic Front (Ganatantrik) or UPDF-Ganatantrik, is a regional political party and militant organization based in Chittagong Hill Tracts of Chittagong, Bangladesh. It claims that it wants to seek autonomy for the Chittagong Hill Tracts through democratic and peaceful means.

== History ==
The group was formed in 15 November 2017 by Tapan Jyoti Chakma after a split from the United People's Democratic Front (UPDF) due to him and his supporters believing that the United People's Democratic Front had abandoned their struggle for autonomy and was too busy with their own interests, The Daily Star said in 2018 that at least four members of the United People's Democratic Front (Democratic) had died in Khagrachhari or Rangamati in the last six months.

On 4 May 2018, Tapan Jyoti Chakma and four others were killed when unidentified gunmen opened fire on them while they were going to mourn the death of Shaktiman Chakma, the former vice president of the PCJSS-MN Larma.

On 28 May 2018, three members of the United People's Democratic Front (UPDF) were gunned down by unidentified assailants in Korolyachhari, Baghaichhari Upazila. The United People's Democratic Front blamed the attack on the PCJSS-MN Larma and the United People's Democratic Front (Democratic).
