= Mymensingh City Corporation =

Local governing body of Mymensingh, Bangladesh

Mymensingh City Corporation ময়মনসিংহ সিটি কর্পোরেশন
- Emblem of the Mymensingh City Corporation

Type
- Type: City Corporation

History
- Founded: April 2, 2018; 8 years ago
- New session started: 14 March 2026

Leadership
- Mayor: Vacant since 19 August 2024
- Administrator: Rukonuzzaman Rokon, BNP since 14 March 2026
- Deputy Mayor: Vacant since 19 August 2024
- Chief Executive Officer: Md. Yusuf Ali since 8 January 2022

Structure
- Seats: Vacant seats 44 councillors
- Length of term: Up to five years

Elections
- Voting system: First past the post
- First election: 8 May 2019
- Last election: 9 March 2024
- Next election: TBD

Meeting place
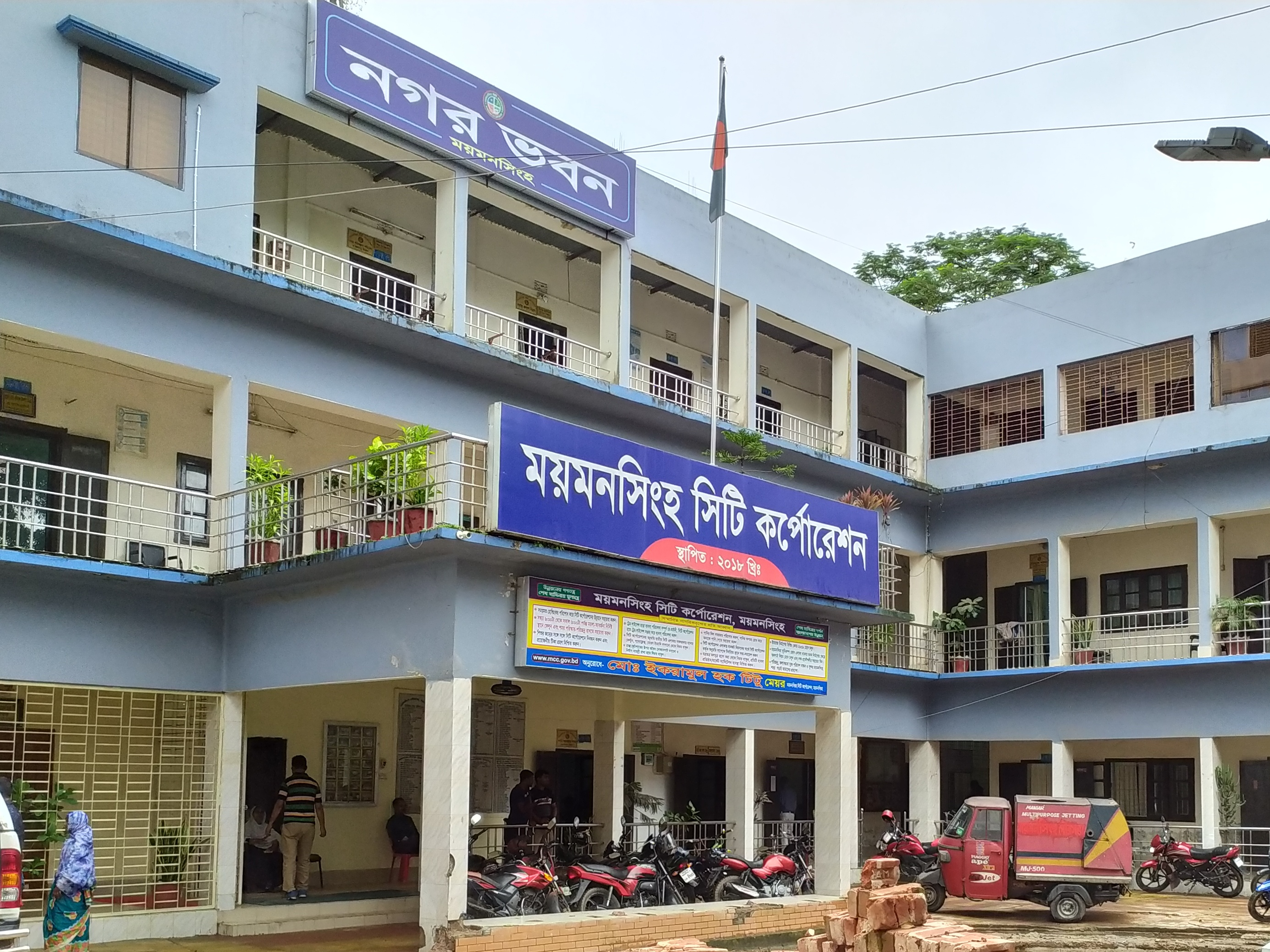
- Nagar Bhaban, Mymensingh

Website
- www.mcc.gov.bd

Mymensingh City Corporation (Bengali: ময়মনসিংহ সিটি কর্পোরেশন: in short-MCC), is a local government authority responsible for administering all civic services in the Mymensingh, the city of Bangladesh. The MCC government is elected by popular vote every five years. The corporation is headed by a mayor, who oversees a council consisting of 44 councillors representing different wards of the city. The functions and powers of the MCC are defined under the provisions of The City Corporation act, 2009.

Mymensingh City Corporation is the municipal corporation of the city of Mymensingh, Bangladesh. The city is located about 120 kilometres (75 mi) north of Dhaka, the capital of the country.

== About MCC ==
Mymensingh Municipality was upgraded to a city corporation, the country's 12th, on 2 April 2018 at a meeting of the National Implementation Committee on Administrative Reforms (NICAR), after satisfying all eight criteria for forming a city corporation. At the time, Cabinet Division Secretary (Coordination and Reforms) NM Ziaul Alam declared that the new city corporation would consist of Mymensingh Municipality, two whole union parishads, and parts of six others, out of the thirteen union parishads of Mymensingh Sadar Upazila. Mymensingh Municipality had an estimated 2018 population of 471,858 in an area of 91.315 square kilometres (35.257 sq mi).

== History ==
In September 2011, the Mymensingh Zila Nagorik Andolon campaigned to turn Mymensingh into the divisional capital and a city corporation. Prime Minister Sheikh Hasina announced plans to turn Mymensingh into a city corporation in January 2013. Mymensingh city was made the capital of the newly formed Mymensingh division, which was the 8th division of Bangladesh. On 20 November 2017, the National Implementation Committee for Administrative Reorganisation decided to make Mymensingh into a city corporation.

== Functions and Services ==
The Mymensingh City Corporation (MCC) is responsible for administering the city and ensuring the provision of essential infrastructure and public services. Its functions include urban planning, transport management, healthcare, education, waste management, water supply, and security. Through these services, MCC aims to improve the quality of life for residents and promote sustainable urban development.

Departments of Mymensingh City Corporation
| # | Departments | Functions / Services |
|---|---|---|
| 1 | Office of the Mayor | Executive administration; city governance; supervision of all MCC services |
| 2 | Chief Executive Office | Departmental coordination; service implementation monitoring |
| 3 | Administration And Establishment | HR management; staff recruitment; service delivery monitoring |
| 4 | Finance and Accounts | Budget preparation; financial planning; payment processing; accounts management; internal audit |
| 5 | Engineering | Road-cutting permission; building design approval; contractor registration; land demarcation certificates |
| 6 | Urban Planning and Development | Road, drain, bridge, culvert and footpath development; land development; planned residential areas; city beautification |
| 7 | Electricity | Installation and maintenance of street lights; lamp-post management; city illumination |
| 8 | Transportation and Communication | Urban transport management; traffic & parking control; emergency transport; corpse handling; bus terminal management; road roller & ambulance services |
| 9 | Waste Management and Cleaning | Solid waste collection and disposal; street cleaning; drain clearing; mosquito control; landfill management |
| 10 | Health | Hospital & clinic management; maternal & child immunization; vitamin A campaigns; midwifery and health technology training |
| 11 | Registrar | Birth & death certificates; nationality, inheritance & character certificates |
| 12 | Education | Management of schools, madrasas, Sanskrit tolls, kindergartens, technical institutes; adult education; teacher training; cultural & theatre institutes |
| 13 | Water Supply and Sewerage | Clean water supply and sewerage management in the entire city corporation. |
| 14 | Revenue | Trade license issuance & renewal; holding tax collection; shop/market allotment; lease and asset management |
| 15 | Security and Law and Order | City security; joint operations with Mymensingh District Police; CCTV installation and monitoring |
| 16 | Magistracy | Arbitration-based case settlement; mobile courts; anti-adulteration drives |
| 17 | Housing and Public Works | Distribution and maintenance of residential plots and flats |
| 18 | Cultural and Social Development | National Day celebrations; charity programs; and children’s park and playground construction & maintenance |
| 19 | Environmental Protection | Pollution control; climate change mitigation; urban greening; tree plantation |
| 20 | Religious Welfare | Support for Eid, Puja, and religious events; Qurbani market permissions; land allocation for religious events |

== Annual Budget ==
Mymensingh City Corporation (MCC) has announced a budget of ৳572.11 crore (US$47 million) for 2023-24 fiscal year.

== Ward and councillor list ==
| # | Ward | Councillor | Party |
|---|---|---|---|
| 1 | Ward-1 | Vacant | TBD |
| 2 | Ward-2 | Vacant | TBD |
| 3 | Ward-3 | Vacant | TBD |
| 4 | Ward-4 | Vacant | TBD |
| 5 | Ward-5 | Vacant | TBD |
| 6 | Ward-6 | Vacant | TBD |
| 7 | Ward-7 | Vacant | TBD |
| 8 | Ward-8 | Vacant | TBD |
| 9 | Ward-9 | Vacant | TBD |
| 10 | Ward-10 | Vacant | TBD |
| 11 | Ward-11 | Vacant | TBD |
| 12 | Ward-12 | Vacant | TBD |
| 13 | Ward-13 | Vacant | TBD |
| 14 | Ward-14 | Vacant | TBD |
| 15 | Ward-15 | Vacant | TBD |
| 16 | Ward-16 | Vacant | TBD |
| 17 | Ward-17 | Vacant | TBD |
| 18 | Ward-18 | Vacant | TBD |
| 19 | Ward-19 | Vacant | TBD |
| 20 | Ward-20 | Vacant | TBD |
| 21 | Ward-21 | Vacant | TBD |
| 22 | Ward-22 | Vacant | TBD |
| 23 | Ward-23 | Vacant | TBD |
| 24 | Ward-24 | Vacant | TBD |
| 25 | Ward-25 | Vacant | TBD |
| 26 | Ward-26 | Vacant | TBD |
| 27 | Ward-27 | Vacant | TBD |
| 28 | Ward-28 | Vacant | TBD |
| 29 | Ward-29 | Vacant | TBD |
| 30 | Ward-30 | Vacant | TBD |
| 31 | Ward-31 | Vacant | TBD |
| 32 | Ward-32 | Vacant | TBD |
| 33 | Ward-33 | Vacant | TBD |
Reserved Women's Councillor
| 34 | Reserved women's seat-1 | Vacant | TBD |
| 35 | Reserved women's seat-2 | Vacant | TBD |
| 35 | Reserved women's seat-3 | Vacant | TBD |
| 37 | Reserved women's seat-4 | Vacant | TBD |
| 38 | Reserved women's seat-5 | Vacant | TBD |
| 39 | Reserved women's seat-6 | Vacant | TBD |
| 40 | Reserved women's seat-7 | Vacant | TBD |
| 41 | Reserved women's seat-8 | Vacant | TBD |
| 42 | Reserved women's seat-9 | Vacant | TBD |
| 43 | Reserved women's seat-10 | Vacant | TBD |
| 44 | Reserved women's seat-11 | Vacant | TBD |

== List of mayors ==
Political parties

- Bangladesh Awami League
- Bangladesh Nationalist Party

Other factions

- Independent

Status

- Acting Mayor and Administrator

| No. | Portrait | Officeholder (birth–death) | Election | Term of office | | | Designation | Political party | Reference |
| No. | Portrait | Officeholder (birth–death) | Election | From | To | Period | Designation | Political party | Reference |
|---|---|---|---|---|---|---|---|---|---|
| 1 | | Ekramul Haque Titu | 2019; 2024 | 27 May 2019 | 19 August 2024 | 5 years, 84 days | Mayor | Bangladesh Awami League | |
| – | | Umme Salma Tanzia | – | 19 August 2024 | 8 November 2024 | 1 year, 298 days | Administrator | Independent | |
| – | | Md. Mokhtar Ahmed | – | 9 November 2024 | 14 March 2026 | 1 year, 125 days | Administrator | Independent | |
| – | | Rukonuzzaman Rokon | – | 14 March 2026 | Incumbent | 91 days | Administrator | Bangladesh Nationalist Party | |

== Deputies ==
The deputy mayor (also known as Panel mayor) is a second-ranking official of city corporation. 3 Panel mayors are appointed by vote of councillors. The 1st panel mayor with the highest number of votes is appointed as deputy mayor. In the absence of the mayor, the deputy mayor controls all functions of the City Corporation.

| Serial No. | Post | Name |
|---|---|---|
| 01 | Panel Mayor 1 | Vacant |
| 02 | Panel Mayor 2 | Vacant |
| 03 | Panel Mayor 3 | Vacant |

== Past elections ==
=== Election Result 2024 ===
Mymensingh Mayoral Election 2024
| Party | Candidate | Votes | % | ±% |
|---|---|---|---|---|
| AL | Ekramul Haque Titu | 139,604 | 73.88 | New |
| Independent | Sadequl Haque Khan Milki | 35,763 | 18.93 | New |
| Independent | Ehteshamul Alam | 10,773 | 5.70 | New |
| Independent | Md. Rezaul Haque | 1,487 | 0.79 | New |
| JP(E) | Shahidul Islam | 1,321 | 0.70 | New |
| Majority | | 103,841 | 55.00 | New |
| Turnout | | 189,439 | 56.30 | New |
| Registered electors | | 336,496 | | |
| AL hold | | | | |
