= Ekramul Haque Titu =

Bangladeshi politician

- ইকরামুল হক টিটু
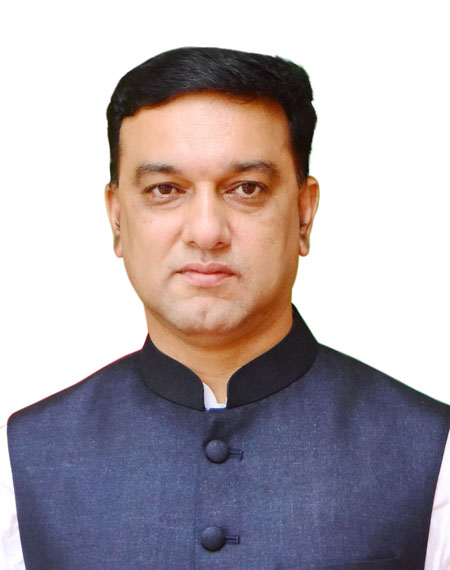

1st Mayor of Mymensingh
- In office 27 May 2019 – 19 August 2024
- Preceded by: Post established
- Succeeded by: Umme Salma Tanzia; as Administrator

Personal details
- Born: 1 August 1976 (age 50) Mymensingh, Bangladesh
- Party: Bangladesh Awami League
- Education: Ananda Mohan College
- Profession: Politician

Ekramul Haque Titu (born 1 August 1976) is a Bangladeshi politician who was the first mayor of Mymensingh City Corporation.

== Early life and education ==
Titu was born on 1 August 1976 in Mymensingh District. He studied in Mymensingh Zilla School and Ananda Mohan College. He graduated from Ananda Mohan College.

== Career ==
He previously was mayor of Mymensingh Municipality. In 2019, he was elected uncontested as the mayor of Mymensingh City Corporation. His rival Jahangir Ahmed, a candidate of the Jatiya Party, withdrew his candidacy so that Titu was elected unopposed. He is the vice president of the Mymensingh unit of the Awami League. On 19 August 2024, he was removed from the position of mayor by the national government.
