= United People's Democratic Front =

Political party in the Chittagong Hill Tracts, Bangladesh

United People's Democratic Front ইউনাইটেড পিপলস ডেমোক্রেটিক ফ্রন্ট
- Abbreviation: UPDF
- President: Prasit Bikash Khisa
- General Secretary: Rabi Shankar Chakma
- Founded: 26 December 1998 (27 years ago)
- Split from: Parbatya Chattagram Jana Samhati Samiti
- Headquarters: Rangamati, Chittagong Hill Tracts, Bangladesh
- Ideology: Autonomism
- House of the Nation: 0 / 350

Election symbol
- Bow and arrow

Party flag

Website
- updfcht.com

United People's Democratic Front (abbreviated as UPDF; Bengali: ইউনাইটেড পিপলস ডেমোক্রেটিক ফ্রন্ট; [junaɪʈeɖ pipɔls ɖemokræʈik frɔnʈ]) is a regional political party based in the Chittagong Hill Tracts of Bangladesh. Chakmas form the majority ethnic group in the party. The United People's Democratic Front claims to seek a fully autonomous Hill Tracts through peaceful and democratic means.

== Founding ==
The United People's Democratic Front was founded on 26 December 1998 at a conference in Dhaka. At the end of the conference, a five-member convening committee was formed with Prasit Bikash Khisha as its convener.

In November 2006, Prasit Bikash Khisha was elected to presidency by the party's central committee during a congress in Dhaka. In the same meeting, Rabi Shankar Chakma became the new general secretary.

== Elections ==
The UPDF took part in the eighth national parliamentary elections in 2001 and though failed to win in any of the two seats in CHT it contested, the party received a considerable number of votes cast, to the surprise of many analysts.

== History ==
In July 2021, the party's Joan Chakma led a contingent of Chakmas to Suandrapara, a village of the Bawm community, where they issued threats and conducted two violent raids that led to a church being damaged. Towards the end of the same month, four of the party's members were arrested for extortion.

On 16 April 2025, UPDF was accused of abducting 5 tribal university students who were members of PCP.

On 17 April 2026, the vice president of the youth wing of UPDF, Dharmasingh Chakma, was allegedly killed by Jana Samhati Samiti members in Rangamati Sadar.
