= Khedarmara Union =

Union of Rangamati District, Chittagong, Bangladesh

Khedarmara খেদারমারা
- Union
- Interactive map of Khedarmara
- Country: Bangladesh
- Division: Chittagong Division
- District: Rangamati District
- Upazila: Baghaichhari Upazila

Area
  - Total: 25.9 km^{2} (10.0 sq mi)

Population (2022)
  - Total: 10,477
  - Density: 405/km^{2} (1,050/sq mi)
- Time zone: UTC+6 (BST)
- Postal code: 4590
- Website: khedarmaraup.rangamati.gov.bd

Khedarmara Union (Bengali: খেদারমারা ইউনিয়ন) is a union parishad under Bagaichhari Upazila of Rangamati District in eastern Bangladesh.

== Geography ==
Khedarmara Union has a total area of 6,530 acres (2,640 ha). It is bounded on the northeast, east, and south by the Kachalong River (across which lie Baghaichari Union and Sharoyatali Union). It borders Dighinala Upazila to the west and Rupokari Union to the northwest.

== Demographics ==
According to the 2022 Bangladesh census, Baghaichari Union had a population of 10,477. Among them, 8,487 are Buddhist, 1,469 are Muslim, 519 are Hindu and 2 are Christian.

Religion-2022
1. Buddhism (81.0%)
2. Islam (14.0%)
3. Hinduism (4.95%)
4. Christianity (0.02%)
5. Others (0.00%)

== Ethnicity ==
This Union is home to a variety of different ethnic groups. Among them, 12,092 are Bengali, 8,343 are Chakma and 42 are of others ethnic groups.

Ethnicity-2022
1. Chakma (79.6%)
2. Bengali (20.0%)
3. Others (0.50%)

== Education ==
There are two secondary schools in the union, Khedar Mara High School and Uluchhari Mouza High School.
