= Sajek =

Sajek is a tourists spot in Chittagong Hill Tracts, Bangladesh. It may refer to:

- Sajek Valley, a valley in Rangamati district
- Sajek Union, a union in Rangamati district
