= Rupakari Union =

Union of Rangamati District, Chittagong, Bangladesh

Rupakari রূপকারী
- Union
- Interactive map of Rupakari
- Country: Bangladesh
- Division: Chittagong Division
- District: Rangamati District
- Upazila: Baghaichhari Upazila

Area
  - Total: 20.72 km^{2} (8.00 sq mi)

Population (2022)
  - Total: 4,804
  - Density: 231.9/km^{2} (600.5/sq mi)
- Time zone: UTC+6 (BST)
- Postal code: 4590
- Website: rupokariup.rangamati.gov.bd

Rupakari Union is a union of Baghaichhari Upazila under Rangamati District.

== Demography ==
According to 2022 census, total population of the Union are 4,804. Among them, 470 are Muslim, 4,310 are Buddhist, 21 are Hindu and 3 are Christian.

Religion-2022
1. Buddhism (89.7%)
2. Islam (9.78%)
3. Hinduism (0.44%)
4. Christianity (0.06%)
5. Others (0.00%)

== Ethnicity ==
This Union is home to mainly Bengalis and Chakmas. Among them, 514 are Bengali, 4,284 are Chakma and 6 are of others ethnic groups.

Ethnicity-2022
1. Chakma (89.2%)
2. Bengali (10.7%)
3. Others (0.12%)
