= Marishya Union =

Union of Rangamati District, Chittagong, Bangladesh

Marishya মারিশ্যা
- Union
- Interactive map of Marishya
- Country: Bangladesh
- Division: Chittagong Division
- District: Rangamati District
- Upazila: Baghaichhari Upazila

Area
  - Total: 10.36 km^{2} (4.00 sq mi)

Population (2022)
  - Total: 5,947
  - Density: 574.0/km^{2} (1,487/sq mi)
- Time zone: UTC+6 (BST)
- Postal code: 4590
- Website: marishaup.rangamati.gov.bd

Marishya Union is a union of Baghaichhari Upazila under Rangamati District.

== Demography ==
According to 2022 census, total population of the Union are 5,947. Among them, 1,185 are Muslim, 4,753 are Buddhist and 9 follow others religion.

Religion-2022
1. Buddhism (79.9%)
2. Islam (19.9%)
3. Others (0.15%)

== Ethnicity ==
This Union is home to a variety of different ethnic groups. Among them, 1,189 are Bengali, 4,745 are Chakma and 11 are of others ethnic groups.

Ethnicity-2022
1. Chakma (79.8%)
2. Bengali (20.0%)
3. Others (0.22%)
