= Bangaltali Union =

Union of Rangamati District, Chittagong, Bangladesh

Bangaltali বঙ্গলতলী
- Union
- Interactive map of Bangaltali
- Country: Bangladesh
- Division: Chittagong Division
- District: Rangamati District
- Upazila: Baghaichhari Upazila

Area
  - Total: 18.13 km^{2} (7.00 sq mi)

Population (2022)
  - Total: 10,816
  - Density: 596.6/km^{2} (1,545/sq mi)
- Time zone: UTC+6 (BST)
- Postal code: 4590
- Website: bongoltaliup.rangamati.gov.bd

Rupakari Union is a union of Baghaichhari Upazila under Rangamati District.

== Demography ==
According to 2022 census, total population of the Union are 10,816. Among them, 441 are Muslim, 10,051 are Buddhist, 240 are Hindu and 84 are Christian.

Religion-2022
1. Buddhism (92.9%)
2. Islam (4.08%)
3. Hinduism (2.22%)
4. Christianity (0.78%)
5. Others (0.00%)

== Ethnicity ==
This Union is home to mainly Bengali and Chakma. Among them, 2,118 are Bengali, 8,684 are Chakma and 14 are of others ethnic groups.

Ethnicity-2022
1. Chakma (80.3%)
2. Bengali (19.6%)
3. Others (0.13%)
