= Amtali Union, Baghaichhari =

Union of Rangamati District, Chittagong, Bangladesh

Amtali আমতলী
- Union
- Interactive map of Amtali
- Country: Bangladesh
- Division: Chittagong Division
- District: Rangamati District
- Upazila: Baghaichhari Upazila

Area
  - Total: 7.77 km^{2} (3.00 sq mi)

Population (2022)
  - Total: 5,703
  - Density: 734/km^{2} (1,900/sq mi)
- Time zone: UTC+6 (BST)
- Postal code: 4590
- Website: amtaliup.rangamati.gov.bd

Amtali Union is a union of Baghaichhari Upazila under Rangamati District.

== Demography ==
According to 2022 census, total population of the Union are 5,703. Among them, 5,642 are Muslim, 51 are Hindu, 8 are Buddhist and 2 follow others religion.

Religion-2022
1. Islam (98.9%)
2. Hinduism (0.89%)
3. Buddhism (0.14%)
4. Others (0.04%)

== Ethnicity ==
In this union, 5,700 people are Bengali and 3 are of others ethnic groups.

Ethnicity-2022
1. Bengali (100.0%)
2. Others (0.05%)
