= Baghaichhari =

Baghaichhari is an administrative subdivision in Bangladesh. It may refer to:

- Baghaichhari Upazila, a upazila in Rangamati district
  - Baghaichari Union, a union in Baghaichhari Upazila
  - Baghaichhari, Rangamati, a town in Baghaichhari Upazila
