= Saroatali Union =

Union of Rangamati District, Chittagong, Bangladesh

Saroatali সারোয়াতলী
- Union
- Interactive map of Saroatali
- Country: Bangladesh
- Division: Chittagong Division
- District: Rangamati District
- Upazila: Baghaichhari Upazila

Area
  - Total: 12.95 km^{2} (5.00 sq mi)

Population (2022)
  - Total: 11,680
  - Density: 901.9/km^{2} (2,336/sq mi)
- Time zone: UTC+6 (BST)
- Postal code: 4590
- Website: sharoyataliup.rangamati.gov.bd

Saroatali Union is a union of Baghaichhari Upazila under Rangamati District.

== Demography ==
According to 2022 census, total population of the Union are 11,680. Among them, 129 are Muslim, 11,532 are Buddhist, 10 are Hindu, 5 are Christian and 4 follow others religion.

Religion-2022
1. Buddhism (98.7%)
2. Islam (1.11%)
3. Hinduism (0.09%)
4. Christianity (0.04%)
5. Others (0.03%)

== Ethnicity ==
This Union is home to a variety of different ethnic groups. Among them, 193 are Bengali, 11,448 are Chakma and 39 are of others ethnic groups.

Ethnicity-2022
1. Chakma (98.0%)
2. Bengali (1.65%)
3. Others (0.34%)
