= Baghaichhari Upazila =

Baghaichhari বাঘাইছড়ি
- Upazila
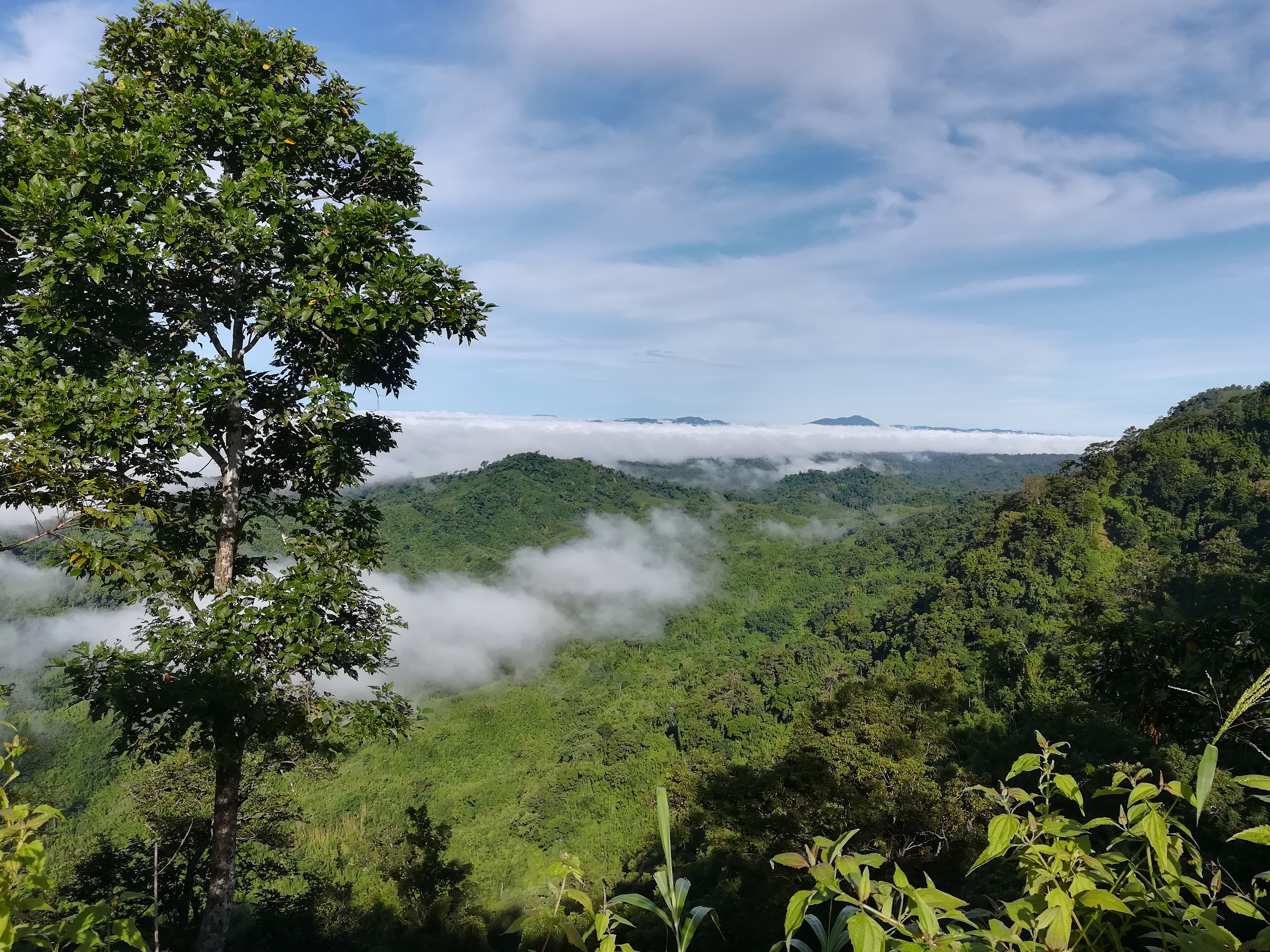
- View of Konglak Haphong

- Coordinates: 23°9′N 92°11.5′E
- Country: Bangladesh
- Division: Chittagong
- District: Rangamati

Area
  - Total: 1,931.25 km^{2} (745.66 sq mi)

Population (2022)
  - Total: 106,287
  - Density: 55.0353/km^{2} (142.541/sq mi)
- Time zone: UTC+6 (BST)
- Postal code: 4590
- Website: baghaichari.rangamati.gov.bd

Baghaichhari Upazila mauza geocode map

Baghaichhari (Bengali: বাঘাইছড়ি) is an upazila of Rangamati District in the division of Chittagong, Bangladesh.

== Geography ==
Baghaichhari is located at 23.1500°N 92.1917°E. It has a total area of 1931.25 km^{2}. It is bordered by Khagrachhari district to the west, the Indian state of Tripura to the north, Mizoram (India) to the east and Barkal and Langadu upazilas to the south.

== Demographics ==
According to the 2022 Bangladeshi census, Baghaichhari Upazila had 24,784 households and a population of 106,287. 9.40% of the population were under 5 years of age. Baghaichhari had a literacy rate (age 7 and over) of 67.72%: 74.92% for males and 59.88% for females, and a sex ratio of 108.26 males for every 100 females. 46,066 (43.34%) lived in urban areas.

=== Ethnicity and religion ===
Religions in Bagaichhari Upazila (2022)
Religion	Percent
Buddhism	67.99%
Islam	24.74%
Hinduism	6.67%
Christianity	0.57%
Other or not stated	0.03%

Population by religion in Union/Paurashava
Union/Paurashava	Muslim	Buddhist	Hindu	Others
Baghaichhari Paurashava	12,436	2,445	743	20
Amtali	5,642	51	8	2
Baghaichari	1,621	8,176	23	5
Bangaltali	441	10,051	240	43
Khedarmara	1,469	8,487	519	1
Marishya	1,185	4,753	1	8
Rupakari	470	4,310	21	1
Sajek	2,895	22,460	5,525	283
Saroatali	129	11,532	10	5

🟩 Muslim majority 🟨 Buddhist majority

As of the 2022 Bangladeshi census, Baghaichhari upazila had a population of 106,287. The ethnic population was 76,289 (71.78%), of which Chakma were 70,350 and Tripura 5,457.

Ethnicity in the Baghaichhari Upazila (2022)
1. Chakma (66.2%)
2. Bengali (28.2%)
3. Tripura (5.13%)
4. Others (0.46%)

Population by ethnicity in Union/Paurashava
Union/Paurashava	Bengali	Chakma	Others
Baghaichhari Paurashava	13,319	2,223	102
Amtali	5,700	0	3
Baghaichari	1,670	8,139	17
Bangaltali	2,118	8,684	14
Khedarmara	2,092	8,343	42
Marishya	1,189	4,746	13
Rupakari	515	4,284	6
Sajek	3,198	22,484	5,703
Saroatali	193	11,448	39

🟩 Bengali majority 🟨 Chakma majority

== Administration ==
UNO: Shirin Akter.

Baghaichhari Upazila is divided into Baghaichari Municipality and eight union parishads: Amtali, Baghaichari, Bangaltali, Khedarmara, Marishya, Rupakari, Sajek and Saroatali. The union parishads are subdivided into 19 mauzas and 303 villages.

Baghaichhari Municipality is subdivided into 9 wards and 14 mahallas.

== Places to visit ==
- Konglak Haphong

== Notable people ==
- Kalpana Chakma, activist who disappeared in 1996

== See also ==
- Upazilas of Bangladesh
- Districts of Bangladesh
- Divisions of Bangladesh
