= Sajek Union =

Union of Rangamati District, Chittagong, Bangladesh

Sajek সাজেক
- Union
- Interactive map of Sajek
- Country: Bangladesh
- Division: Chittagong Division
- District: Rangamati District
- Upazila: Baghaichhari Upazila

Area
  - Total: 1,771.55 km^{2} (684.00 sq mi)

Population (2022)
  - Total: 31,385
  - Density: 17.716/km^{2} (45.885/sq mi)
- Time zone: UTC+6 (BST)
- Postal code: 4590
- Website: sajekup.rangamati.gov.bd

Sajek Union is a union of Baghaichhari Upazila under Rangamati District.

== Demography ==
According to 2022 census, total population of the Union are 31,385. Among them, 2,895 are Muslim, 22,460 are Buddhist, 5,524 are Hindu, 503 are Christian and 3 follow others religion.

Religion-2022
1. Buddhism (71.6%)
2. Hinduism (17.6%)
3. Islam (9.23%)
4. Christianity (1.60%)
5. Others (0.01%)

== Ethnicity ==
This Union is home to a variety of different ethnic groups. Among them, 3,198 are Bengali, 22,484 are Chakma and 5,703 are of others ethnic groups.

Ethnicity-2022
1. Chakma (71.6%)
2. Bengali (10.2%)
3. Tripura and Others (18.2%)
