= Kalpana Chakma =

Bangladeshi activist disappeared in 1996

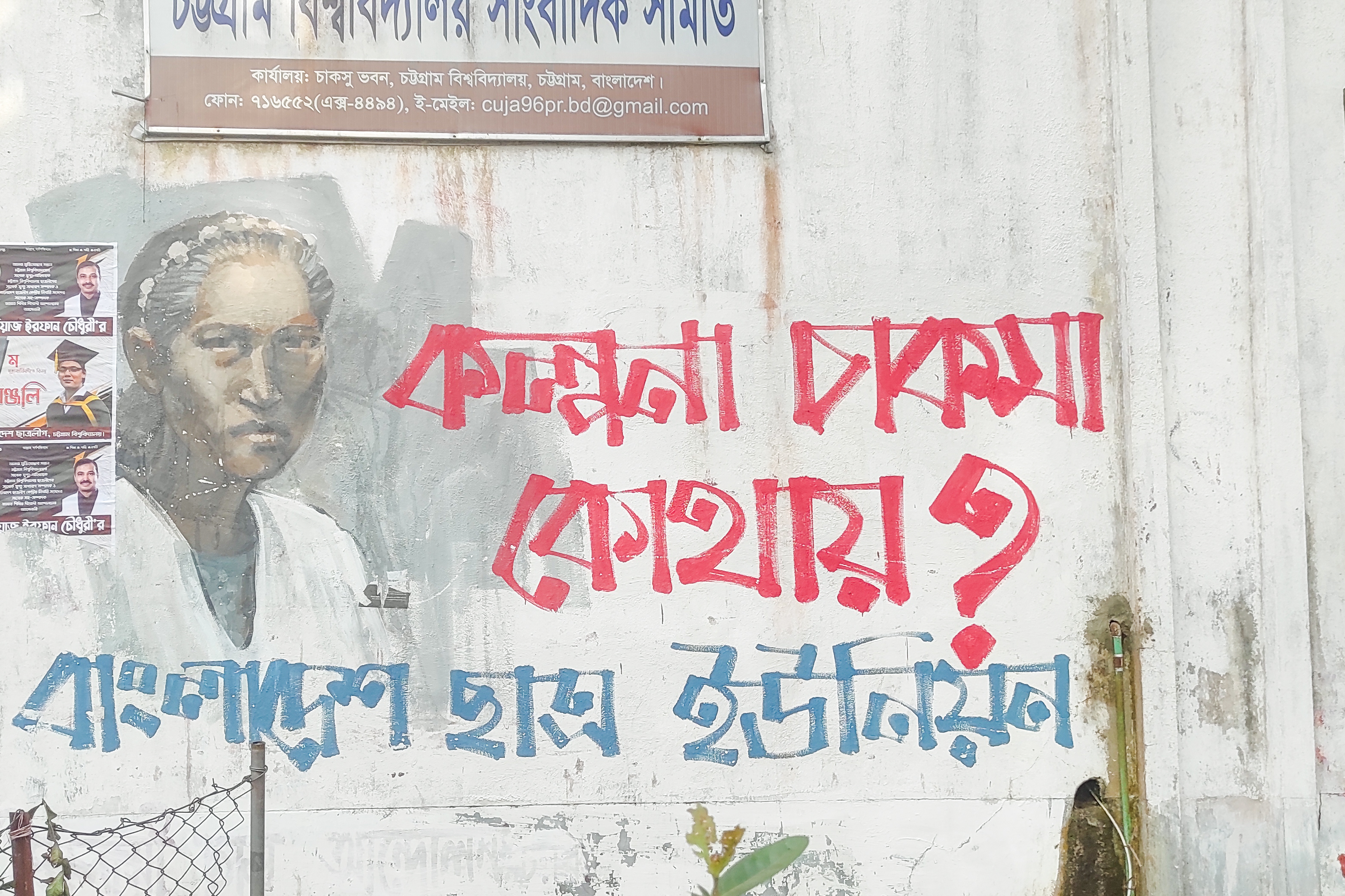
- Wall painting at Chittagong University featuring Kalpana. The Bengali text reads as "Where is Kalpana Chakma?"
- Born: 1 May 1976; Baghaichhari upazila, Rangamati
- Disappeared: after 12 June 1996
- Occupation: Human rights activist
- Known for: Being abducted and presumably killed
- Political party: Pahari Chattra Parishad

Kalpana Chakma (born 1 May 1976) was a human rights activist and feminist from Bangladesh who held the position of Organizing Secretary of the Hill Women's Federation. She and her two brothers were abducted on 12 June 1996 from her home at Lallyaghona village allegedly by the members of the Bangladesh Army. Kalpana Chakma is still missing. No one has been tried for her disappearance. She is presumed to have been killed after her abduction.

== Early life ==
Kalpana Chakma was known as an active human rights activist in the Chittagong Hill Tracts (CHT). She was the organizing secretary of the Hill Women's Federation in Bangladesh. She had been criticizing Bangladesh Army repressions and harassment of the indigenous men and women. She had specially been working for the rights of the indigenous women and protesting Bangladesh Army's repression on the indigenous population by organizing conferences, seminars and meetings in various parts of the CHT. She had also been lending her strong support to the autonomy oriented movement in the CHT spearheaded by the Parbatya Chattagram Jana Samhati Samiti, then paramilitary separatist organization of the CHT's indigenous people. Since the CHT peace treaty, which was signed on 2 December 1997, the organisation has disarmed and are now a political party working for the interests of the indigenous people. The Government of Bangladesh viewed the organization as a threat to the sovereignty of Bangladesh. In the general parliamentary elections of Bangladesh, held on 12 June 1996, she took active part in electioneering in favor of the independent candidate, Bijay Ketan Chakma. He held the post of senior presidium member of Pahari Gana Parishad. She was abducted a few hours before the seventh national elections.

== Abduction ==
Around 1:00 a.m. of 12 June 1996, 6 hours before the general election of Bangladesh, Kalpana Chakma was abducted allegedly by the members of the Bangladesh Army from her home at Lallyaghona village of Rangamati in CHT. An army Lieutenant named Ferdous with two members of Village Defence Party Nurul Haque and Saleh Ahmed from the nearby Kojoichari army barrack raided Kalpana Chakma's home at that night and picked her up forcibly. Kalpana's mother, 60 year old Badhuni Chakma, told reporters –

"We were asleep when someone called out from outside and wanted to know who were inside the house. Then they pulled down the latch of the door from outside and entered the house. They kept powerful torchlight on our face and took away my younger son Khudiram saying that his 'Sir' (Lieut. Ferdous) wanted to talk to him. Few minutes later they took away my elder son Kalicharan and my daughter Kalpana leaving behind myself and Kalicharan's wife."

Kalicharan Chakma, a farmer and bread winner of the family said that three were blindfolded and tied by the hands near the well of the house and were asked to sit down. Kalicharan said –

"Some were wearing army fatigues and some had lungis tied up to their waists. They first took Khudiram from us. They were speaking in Bengali."

Khudiram Chakma, brother of Kalpana Chakma described how he escaped –

"I was asked to dip into the water near the well. As soon as I did so, someone shouted 'shoot him'. Sensing imminent death I somehow untied my hand, removed blindfold around my eyes and started running in the waist deep water. I could hear one gunshot behind me but I kept running."

Kalicharan said that after they led Khudiram away, Kalpana was taken away from his side.

"On hearing the gunshot and the shouting few yards away I untied my hand, removed the fold around my eyes and jumped into the water, they shot at me once and as I ran I could hear Kalpana cry out Dada, Dada, mahre baja (brother, brother, rescue me)."

=== Search for Kalpana Chakma ===
The news of the incident dispersed in all directions immediately and the neighbours were informed of what happened. In the early morning Khudiram with the help of Samrat Sur Chakma approached Kojoichari army camp to enquire about Kalpana Chakma from the camp authority. The camp authority at once branded him as a member of the Shanti Bahini and threatened him. He returned home frustrated. Kalicharan on the other hand, went to the local Baghaichari Police Station to register a First Information Report (FIR). But neither the police station nor the army camp took any action to release Kalpana Chakma from the abductors.

=== Government's role ===
The Superintendent of Police (SP) of Rangamati under severe criticism of various national and international organisations visited Kalpana's home and informed that there were as many as 180 Bangladesh Army barracks in Rangamati district alone and so it was not possible for him to search all of them. On 14 July 1996 several women's organisations jointly submitted a memo to the Home Minister of Bangladesh who advised the team to meet the Prime Minister as the Home Ministry is not concerned with law and order in the CHT. The minister also told that the CHT being an Operational Zone, was an affair of the General Officer in Command (GOC) of the Chittagong Division of Bangladesh Army and he had nothing to do with the issue. The Police investigations did not take into account indigenous eyewitness and did not question the main accused.

=== Bangladesh Army's role ===
On 18 July 1996 the Bangladesh Army circulated leaflets from a helicopter declaring Taka 50,000 for information about the whereabouts of Kalpana Chakma. The Hill Watch Human Rights Forum (HWHRF), a human rights organisation blamed the Bangladesh Army authorities for deliberately trying to cover up the truth. The Bangladesh Army strongly denied the accusation that Lieutenant Ferdous or any other member of the army was involved in the abduction of Kalpana Chakma. Later in the face of strong protest and condemnation, the Bangladesh Army made another attempt to cover up the issue by terming the whole incident as a "love affair". The army again changed its statement and on 23 July 1996 released a statement which runs like this – "Kalpana Chakma had a passport and went abroad secretly". But the claim of the army had been refuted by the indigenous activists and it was found that Kalpana Chakma had no passport. Women's right group have claimed that the accused security personals are still in service.

== See also ==
- List of kidnappings
- List of people who disappeared mysteriously (2000–present)
