= Baghaichari Union =

Union of Rangamati District, Chittagong, Bangladesh

Coordinates: 23.1460°N 92.2219°E

Baghaichari বাঘাইছড়ি
- Union
- Interactive map of Baghaichari
- Country: Bangladesh
- Division: Chittagong Division
- District: Rangamati District
- Upazila: Baghaichhari Upazila

Area
  - Total: 23.31 km^{2} (9.00 sq mi)

Population (2022)
  - Total: 9,826
  - Density: 421.5/km^{2} (1,092/sq mi)
- Time zone: UTC+6 (BST)
- Postal code: 4590
- Website: baghaichariup.rangamati.gov.bd

Baghaichari Union (Bengali: বাঘাইছড়ি ইউনিয়ন) is a union parishad under Baghaichari Upazila of Rangamati District in eastern Bangladesh.

== Geography ==
Baghaichari Union has a total area of 11,044 acres (4,469 ha). It is bounded on the south and west by the Kachalong River (across which lie Kadarmara and Rupokari unions). It borders Marisha Union to the north, Sajek Union to the northeast, and Sharoyatali Union to the east. The union parishad office is 3 kilometres (1.9 mi) south-east of Bagaichhari Municipality, the headquarters of Bagaichhari Upazila.

== Demographics ==
According to the 2022 Bangladesh census, Baghaichari Union had a population of 9,826. Among them, 8176 are Buddhist, 1621 are Muslim, 23 are Hindu, 3 are Christian and 3 are unclassified.

Religion-2022
1. Buddhism (83.2%)
2. Islam (16.5%)
3. Hinduism (0.23%)
4. Christianity (0.03%)
5. Others (0.03%)

== Ethnicity ==
This Union is home to a variety of different ethnic groups. Among them, 1,670 are Bengali, 8,139 are Chakma and 17 are of others ethnic groups.

Ethnicity-2022
1. Chakma (82.8%)
2. Bengali (17.0%)
3. Others (0.17%)

== Education ==
There is one secondary school in the union, Ugal Chhari High School.
