= Sajek Valley =

Tourist spot in Bangladesh

Sajek Valley সাজেক উপত্যকা
- Hill Station
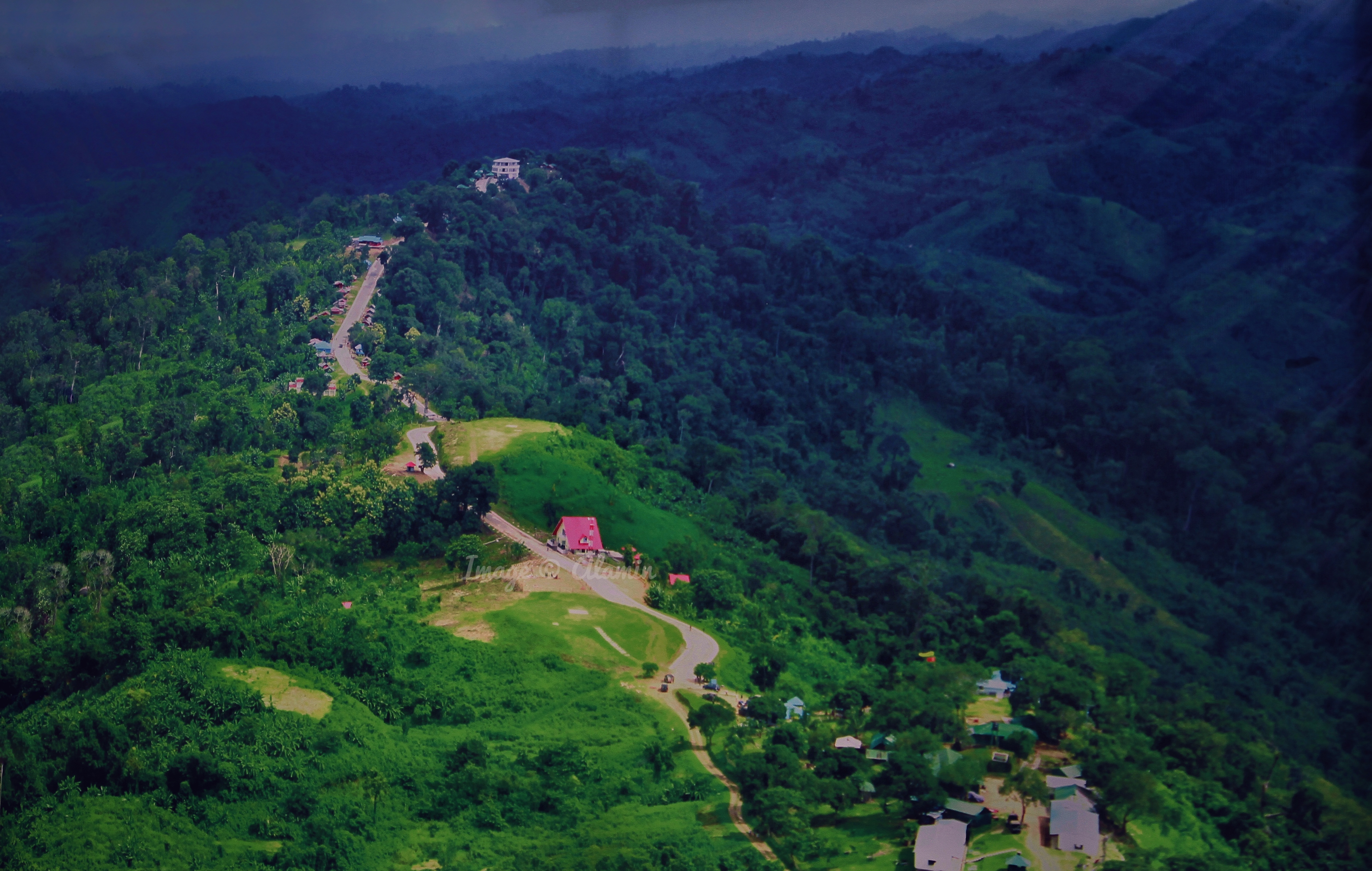
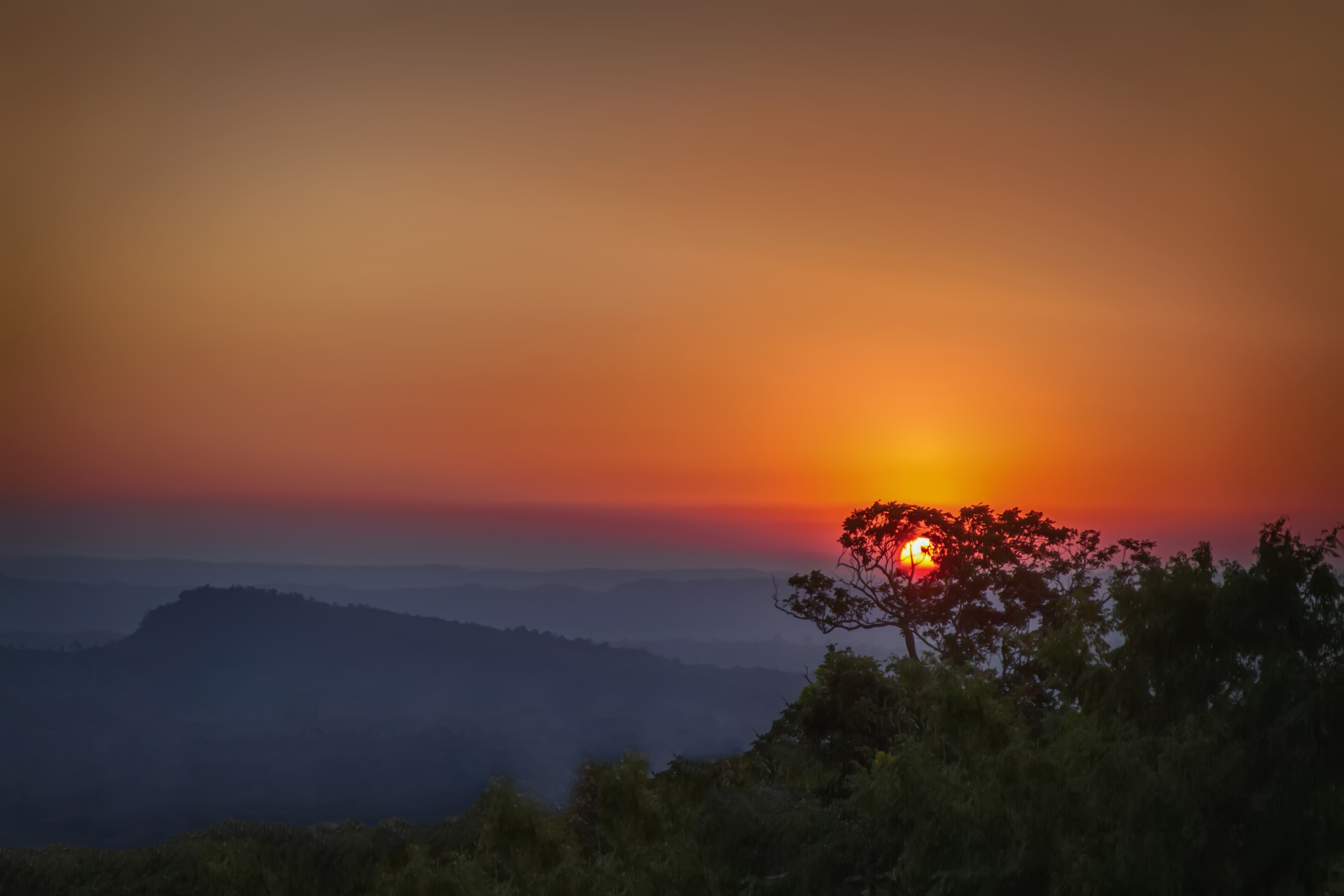
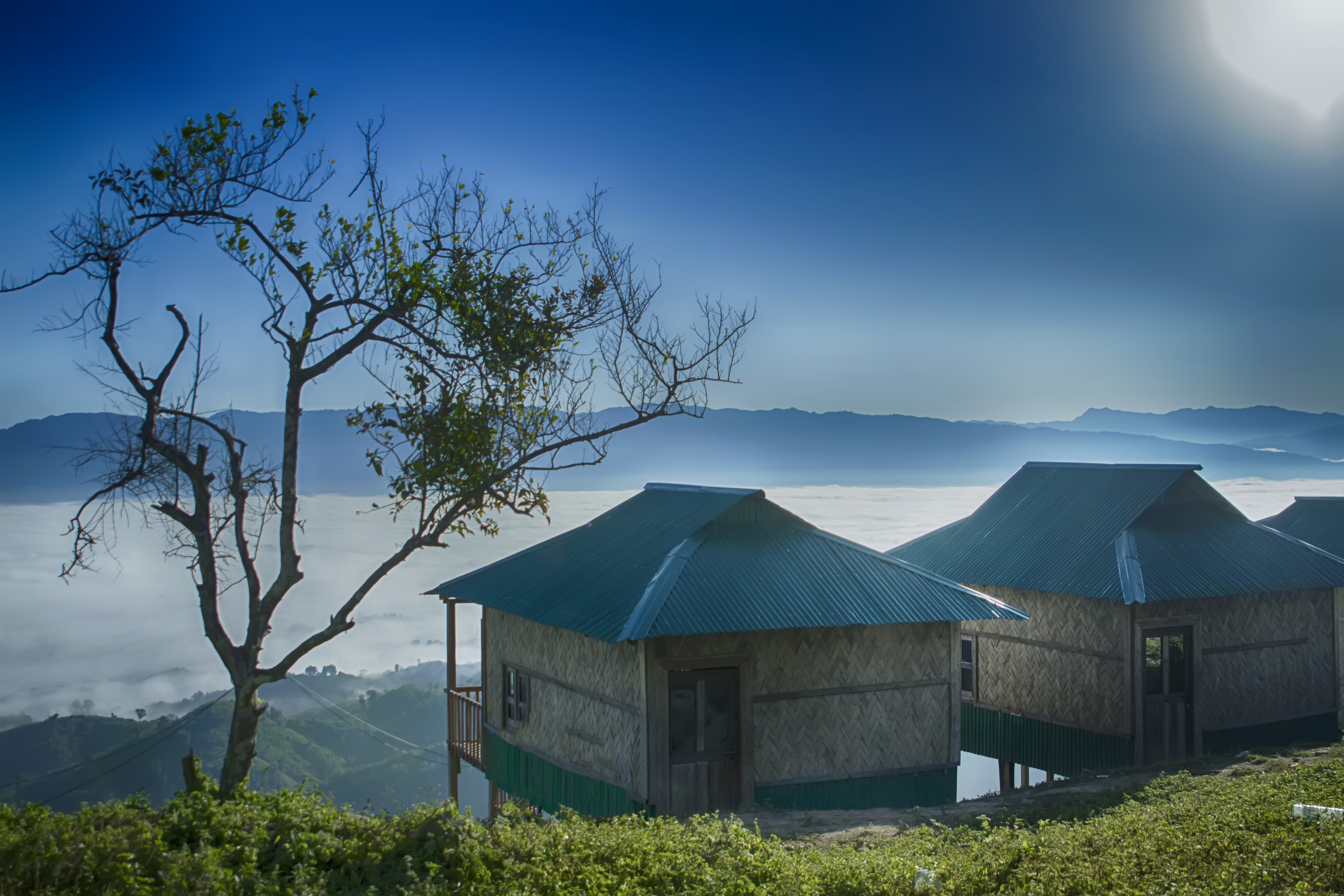
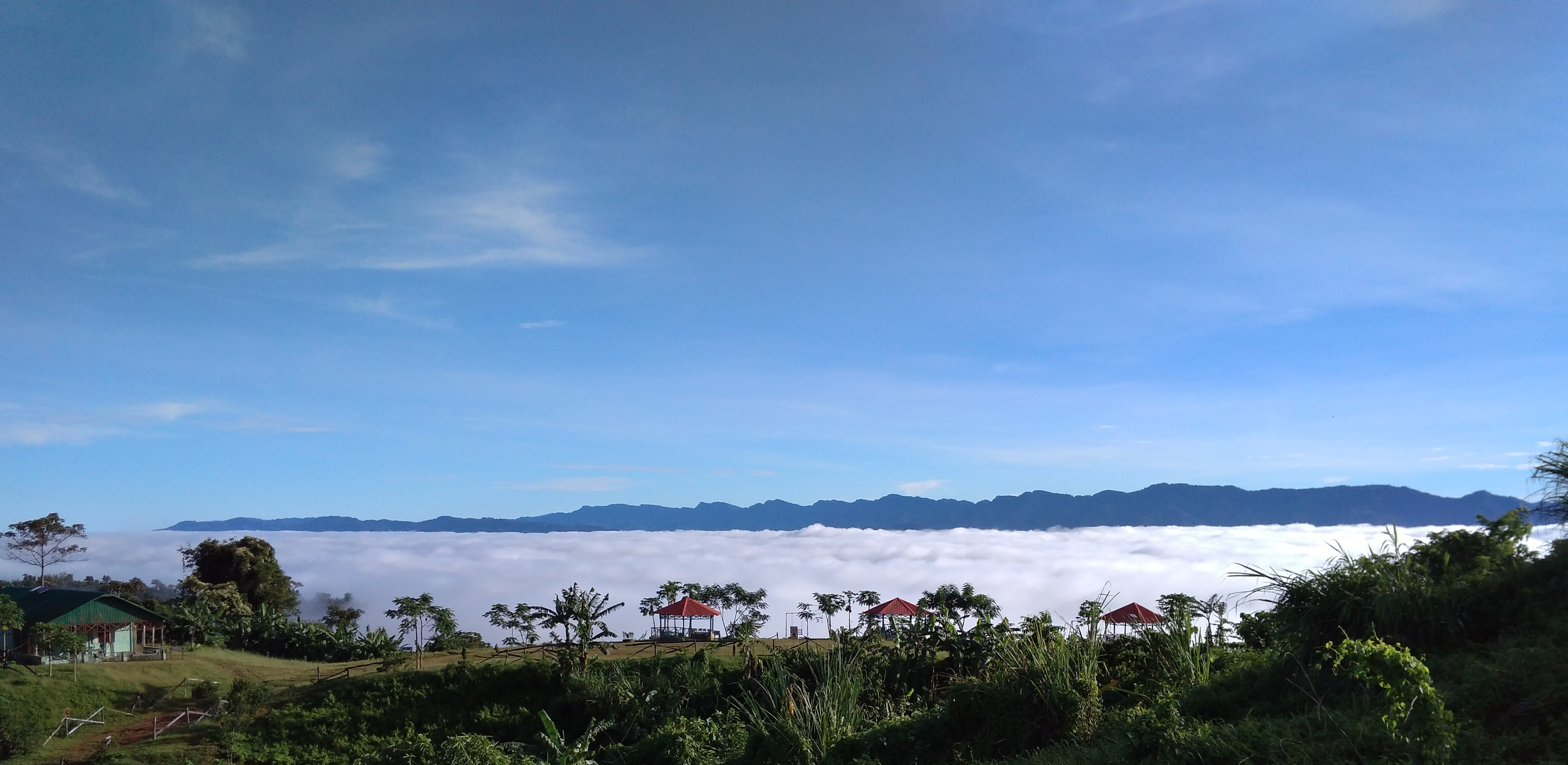
- From top: Sajek Valley View; Sunrise from Konglak Hill; Konglak Hill; View from Helipad
- Interactive map of Sajek Valley
- Coordinates: 23°38.1′N 92°29.4′E
- Country: Bangladesh
- District: Rangamati District
- Upazilla: Baghaichhari
- Settlement: 1885 CE

Sajek Valley (Bengali: সাজেক উপত্যকা) is a popular tourist spot in Bangladesh, situated among the hills of the Kasalong range of mountains in the northern area of the Chittagong Hill Tracts. Referred to as the "Queen of Hills" and the "Roof of Rangamati", the valley is known for its greenery and dense forests, situated at an elevation of 1,800 feet (550 m) above sea level.

== History ==
The designation of Sajek Valley is derived from the Sajek River, which originates from the Karnaphuli River. Previously considered one of the most remote regions due to its challenging steep terrain and lack of significant economic activity, the valley has settlements dating back to 1885. Tourism commenced in the early 2010s, following the establishment of a road network connecting the valley to the rest of the country. The construction of this road was undertaken by the Bangladesh Army and took approximately 10 years to complete. As of 2020, there are 83 registered resorts in the region, up from six in 2016. In 2020, tourism was temporarily halted for five months due to the COVID-19 pandemic. In late February 2025, a fire broke out at a tourist resort in Sajek and completely destroyed 32 resorts and cottages, 36 residential houses, six restaurants and 20 shops.

== Geography ==
Sajek Valley is situated within Sajek Union—the largest union of the country by area—positioned in the northern region of the Chittagong Hill Tracts, among the Kasalong range of hills. It falls under the administrative jurisdiction of Baghaichhari Upazila in the Rangamati Hill District, situated about 70–80 kilometres (43–50 mi) from Khagrachhari. The valley is located close to the Indian border state of Mizoram, surrounded by the hills of Mizoram on the east and Tripura on the north. It rises 1,800 feet (550 m) above sea level.

=== Environment ===
Sajek Valley is known for its natural environment and is surrounded by green mountains, dense forests, and hilly terrain. Many small rivers flow through the mountains, among which the Sajek (also Kasalong) and the Masalong are notable. On the way to Sajek Valley, one has to cross the Mayni Range and the Mayni River. The road to Sajek features steep inclines and descents.

=== Settlements ===
At the onset of Sajek Valley lies Ruilui Para village, while at its farthest point stands Konglak Hill, with Konglak Para village situated atop its summit. There are several more remote settlements, including Hamari Para, inhabited by small ethnic minority groups.

== Demographics ==
The inhabitants of Sajek Valley comprise various ethnic minority groups, including the Chakma, Marma, Tripuri, Pankho, Lushai, and other indigenous communities. In this community, there is a notable involvement of women in economic pursuits, particularly in activities such as fruit and vegetable picking. While proficiency in Bengali may not be widespread among them, the younger generation often possesses some degree of proficiency in English.

== Communication ==
The valley is more conveniently accessed via Dighinala in Khagrachhari District. Covering a distance of approximately 70 kilometres (43 mi) from Khagrachhari to Sajek, the main mode of transport is four-wheelers known as chander gari (Bengali: চান্দের গাড়ি or চাঁদের গাড়ি), which visitors typically hire for group travel.

== Gallery ==
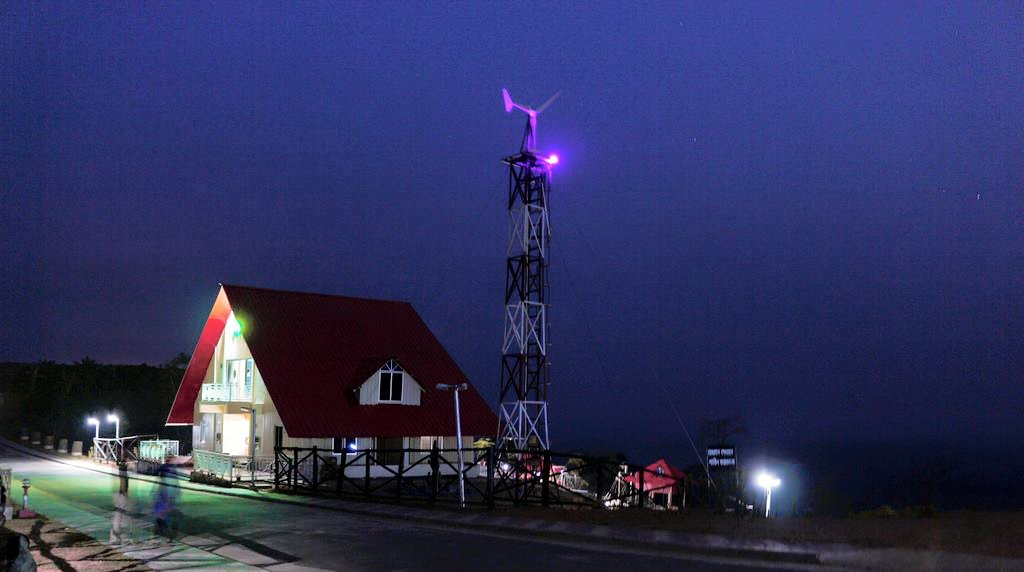
Sajek at Night

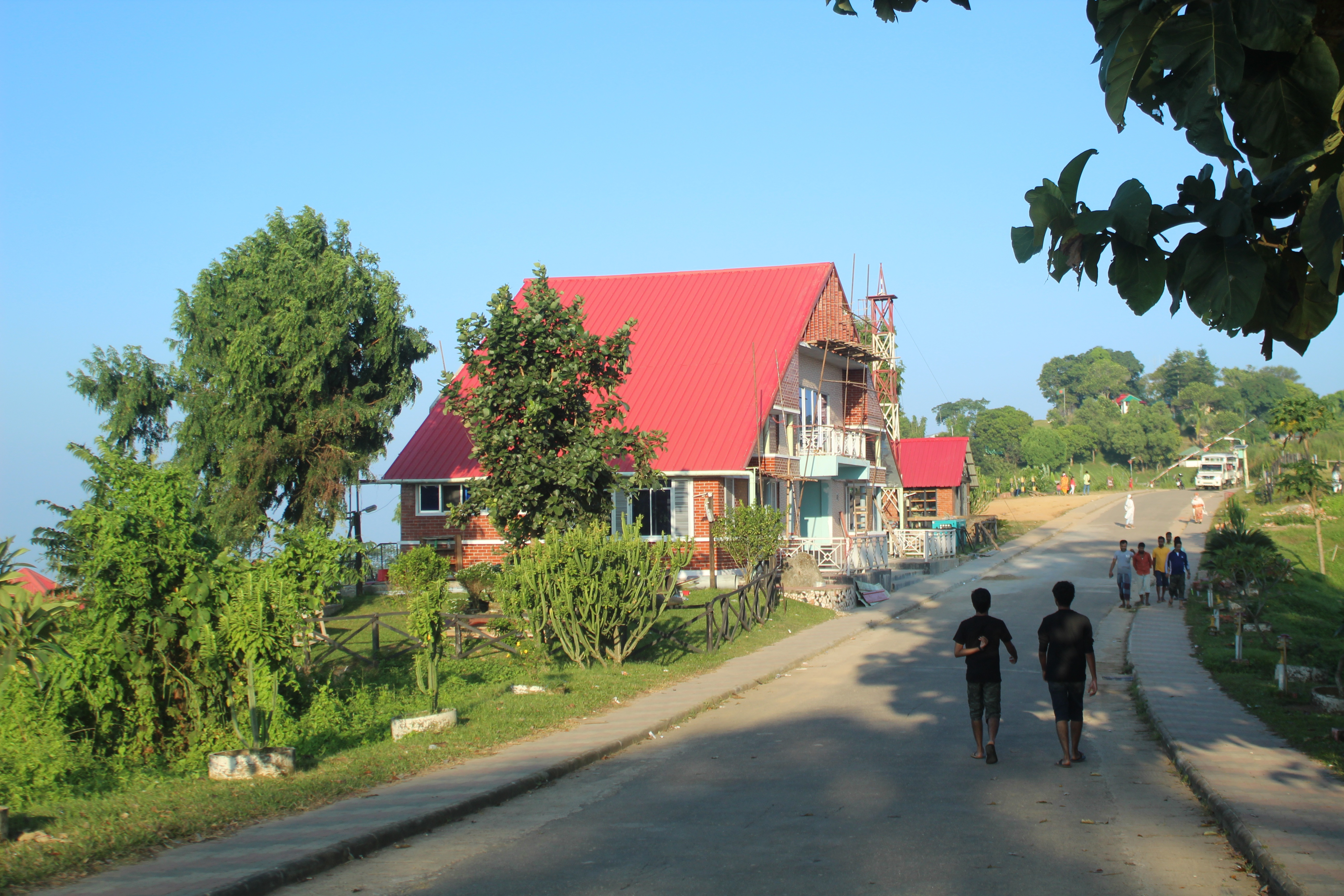
Runmoy resort at Sajek Valley

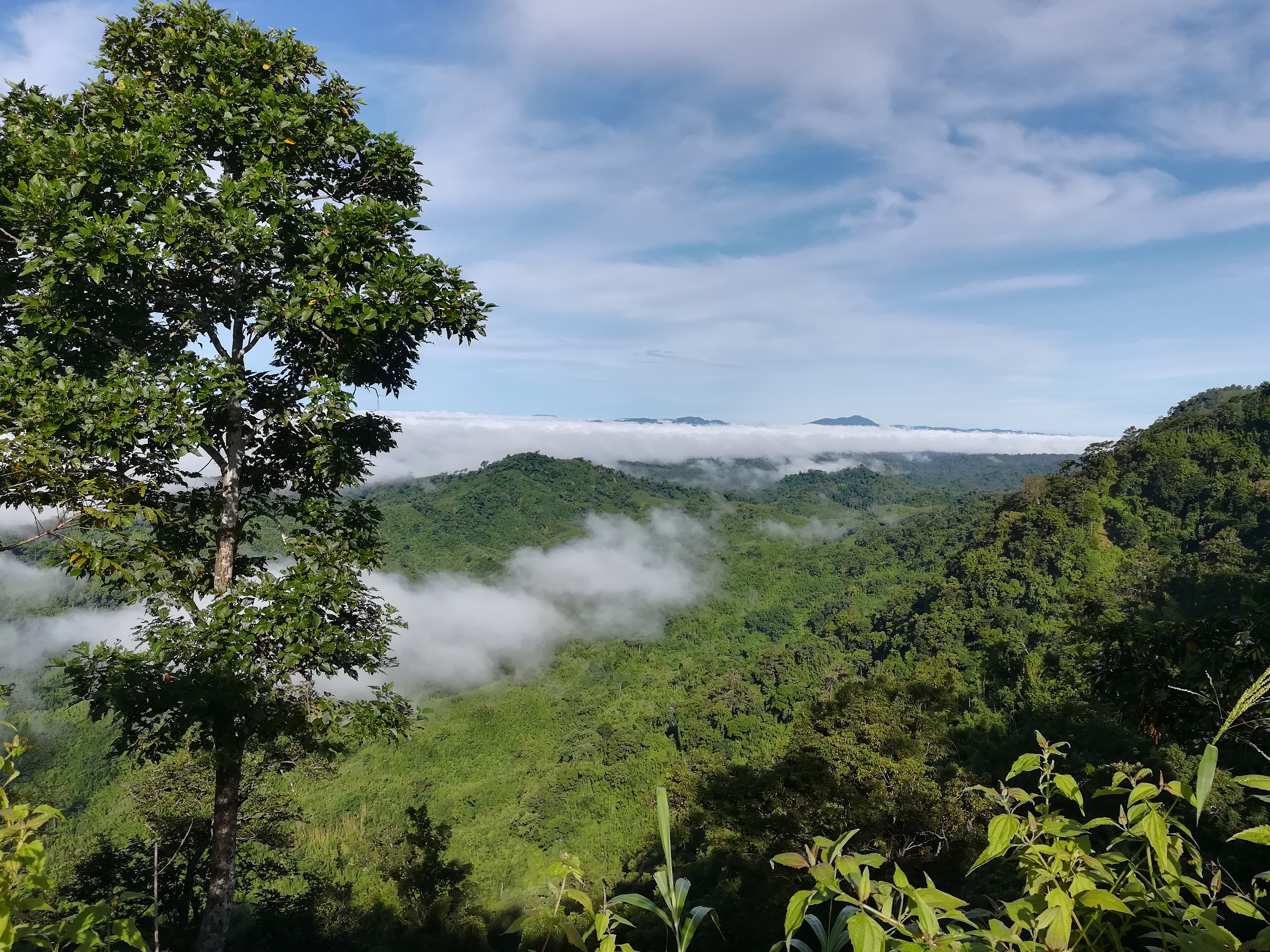
View of Konglak Hill or Konglak Haphong

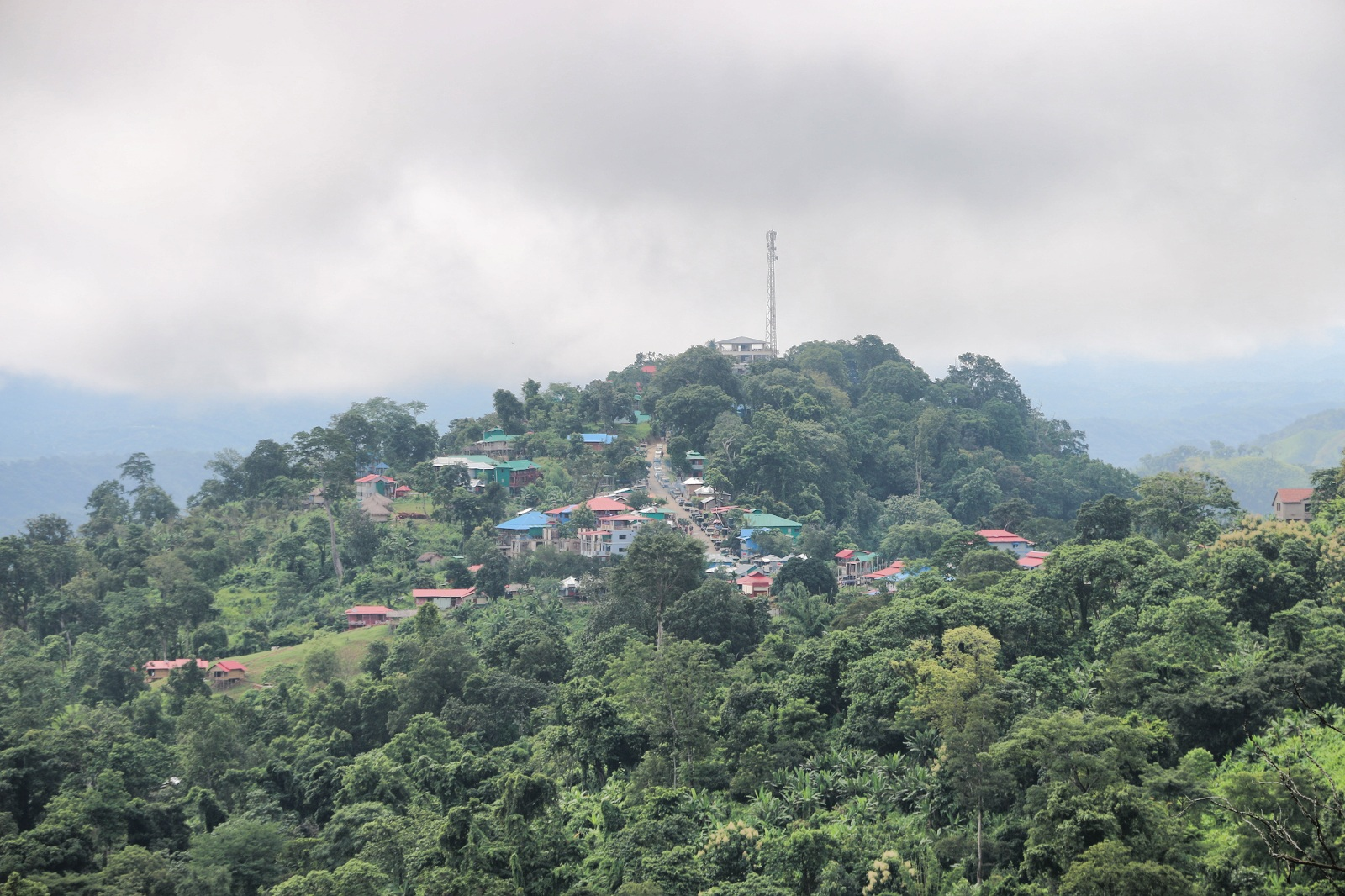
Sajek Valley from Konglak Hill

== See also ==
- Tourism in Bangladesh
- Chittagong Hill Tracts
