= Chittagong Division =

Division of Bangladesh

Chittagong Division চট্টগ্রাম বিভাগ
- Division of Bangladesh
- Chattogram Division
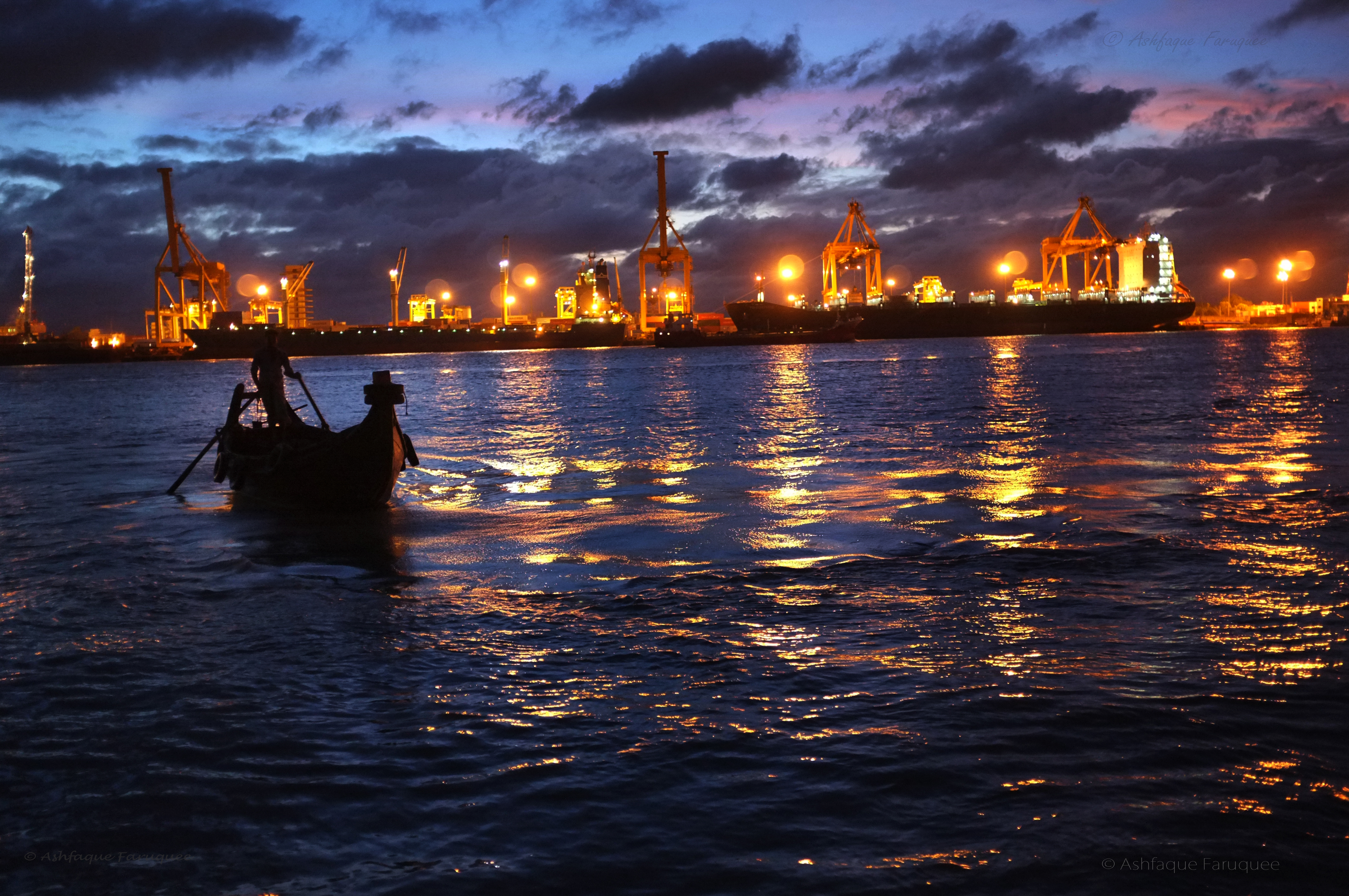
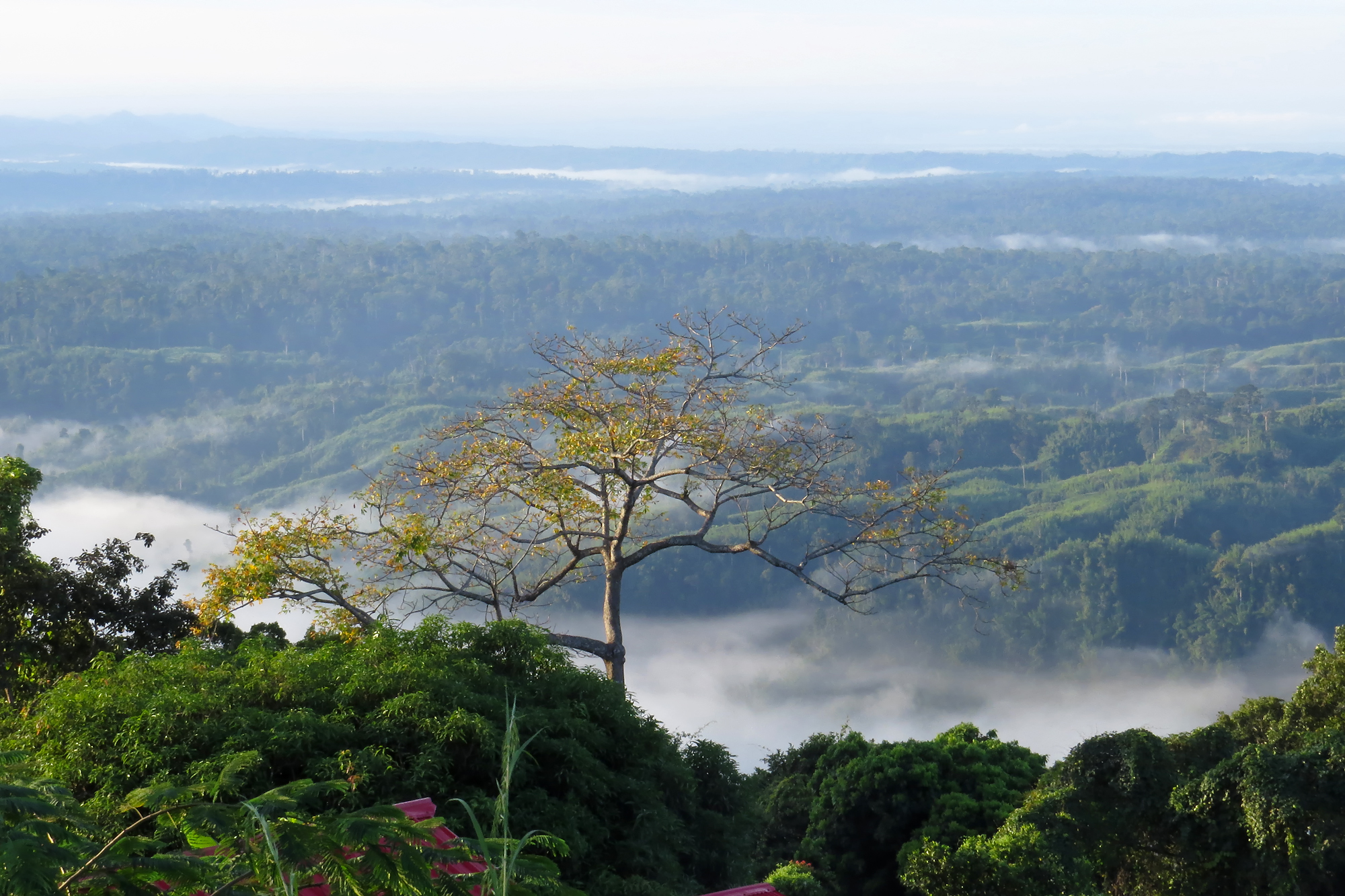
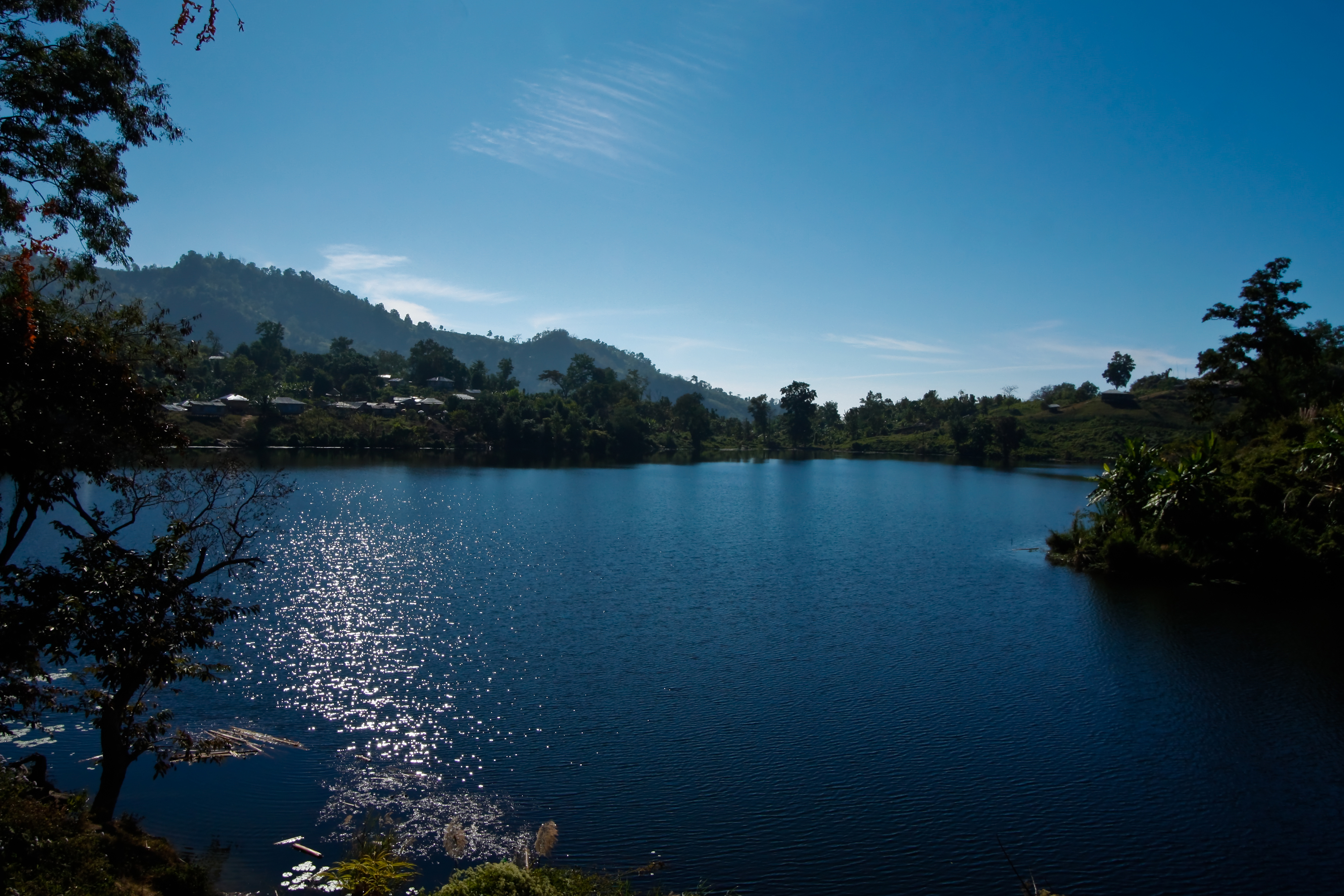
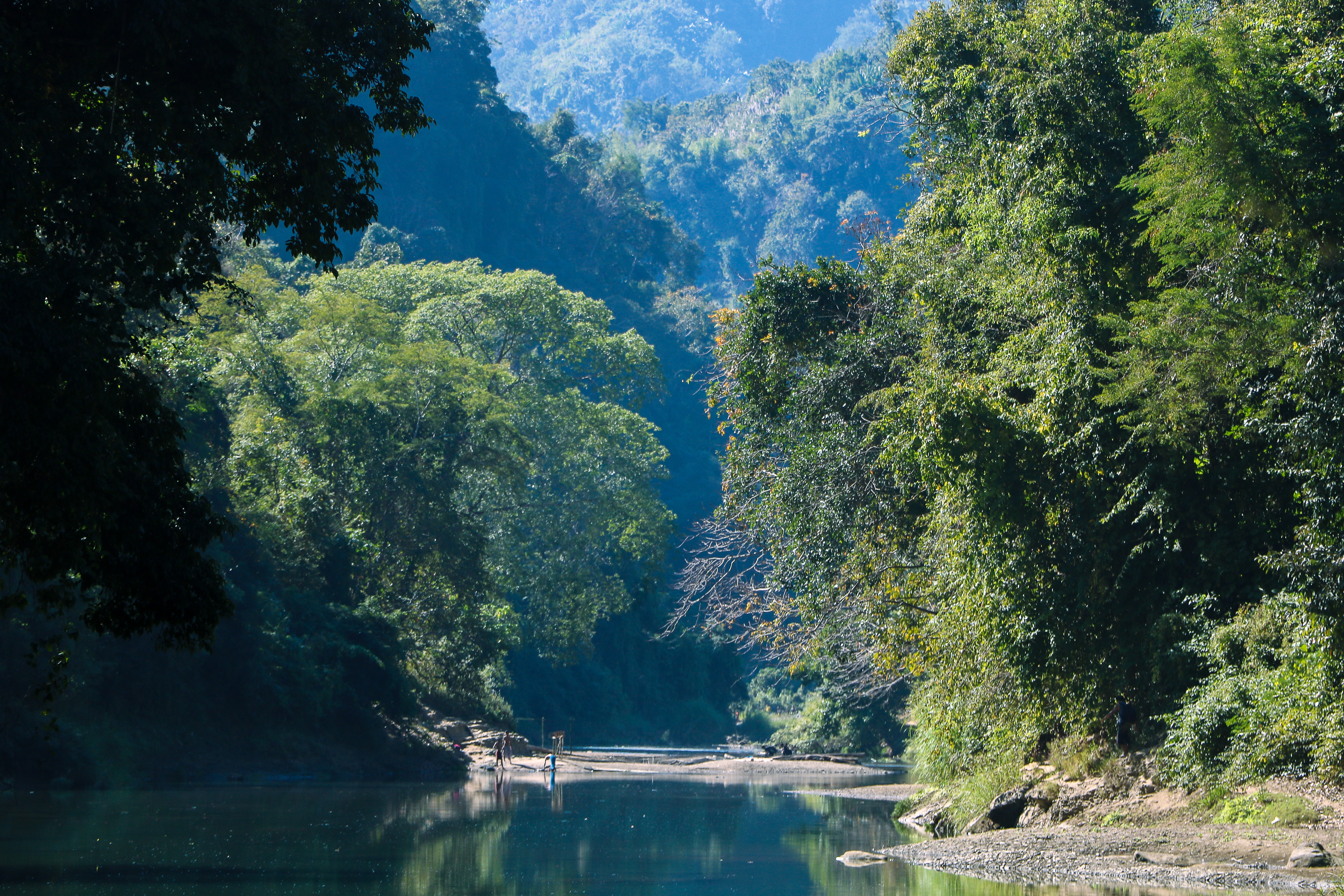
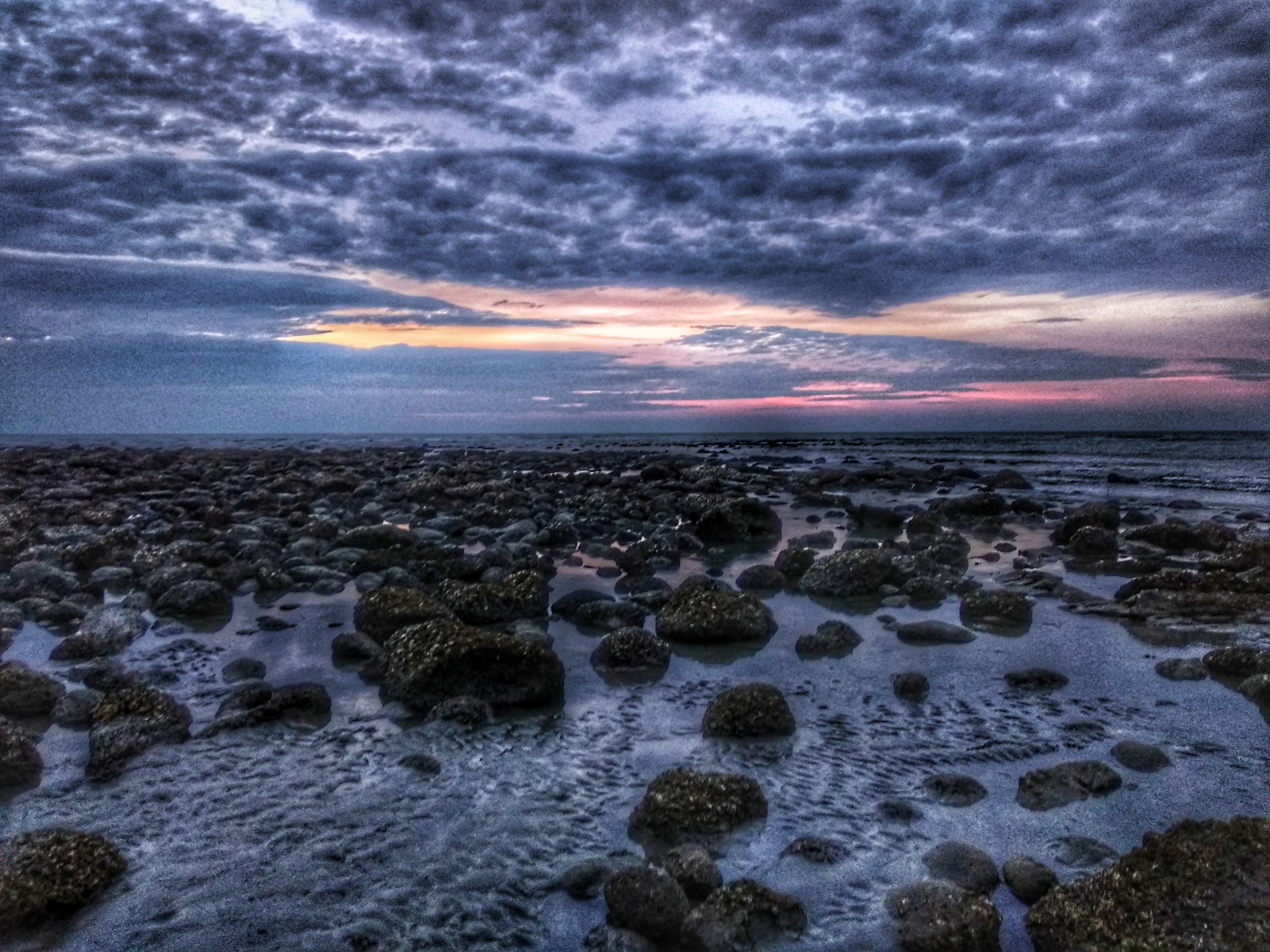
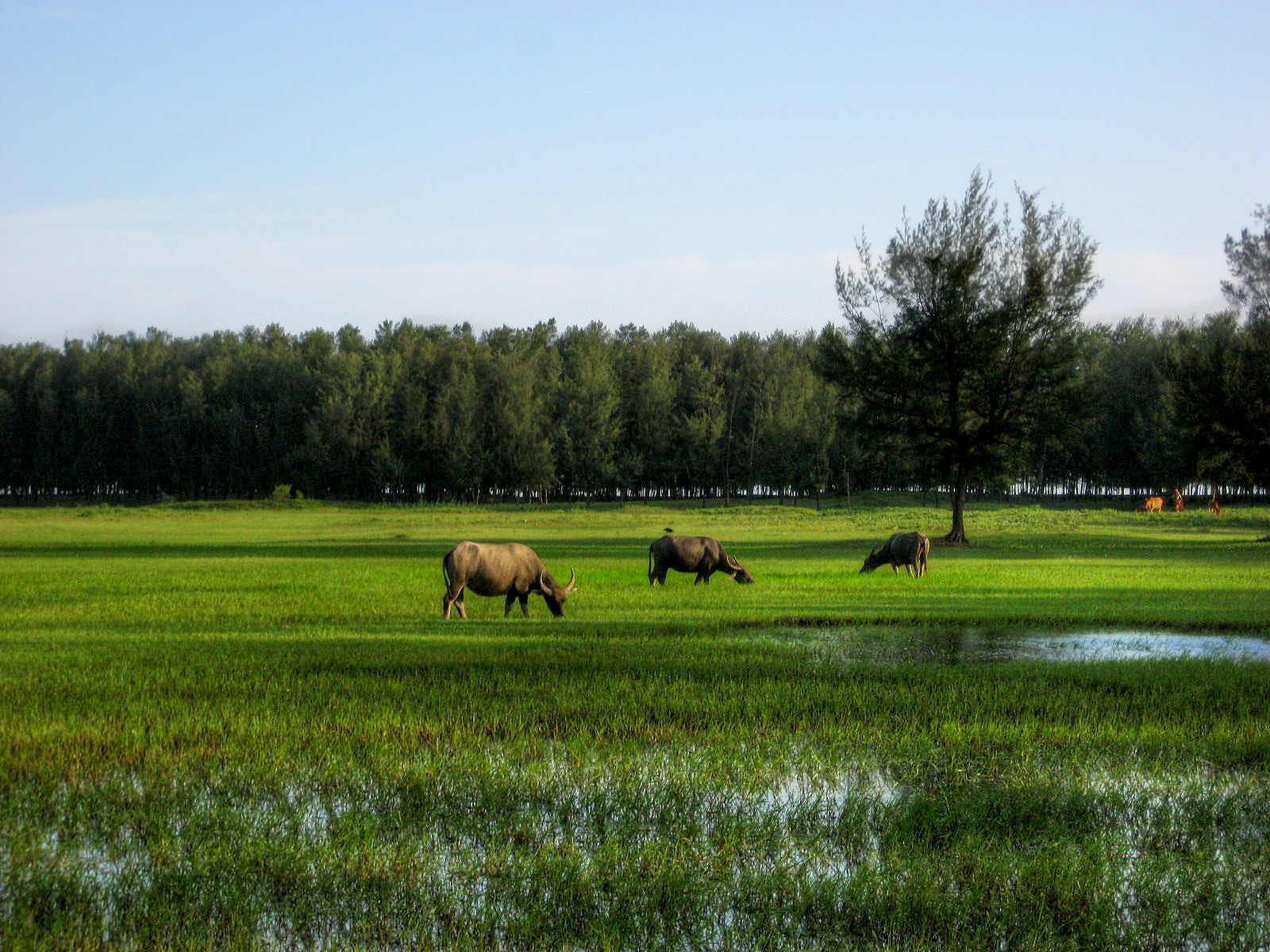
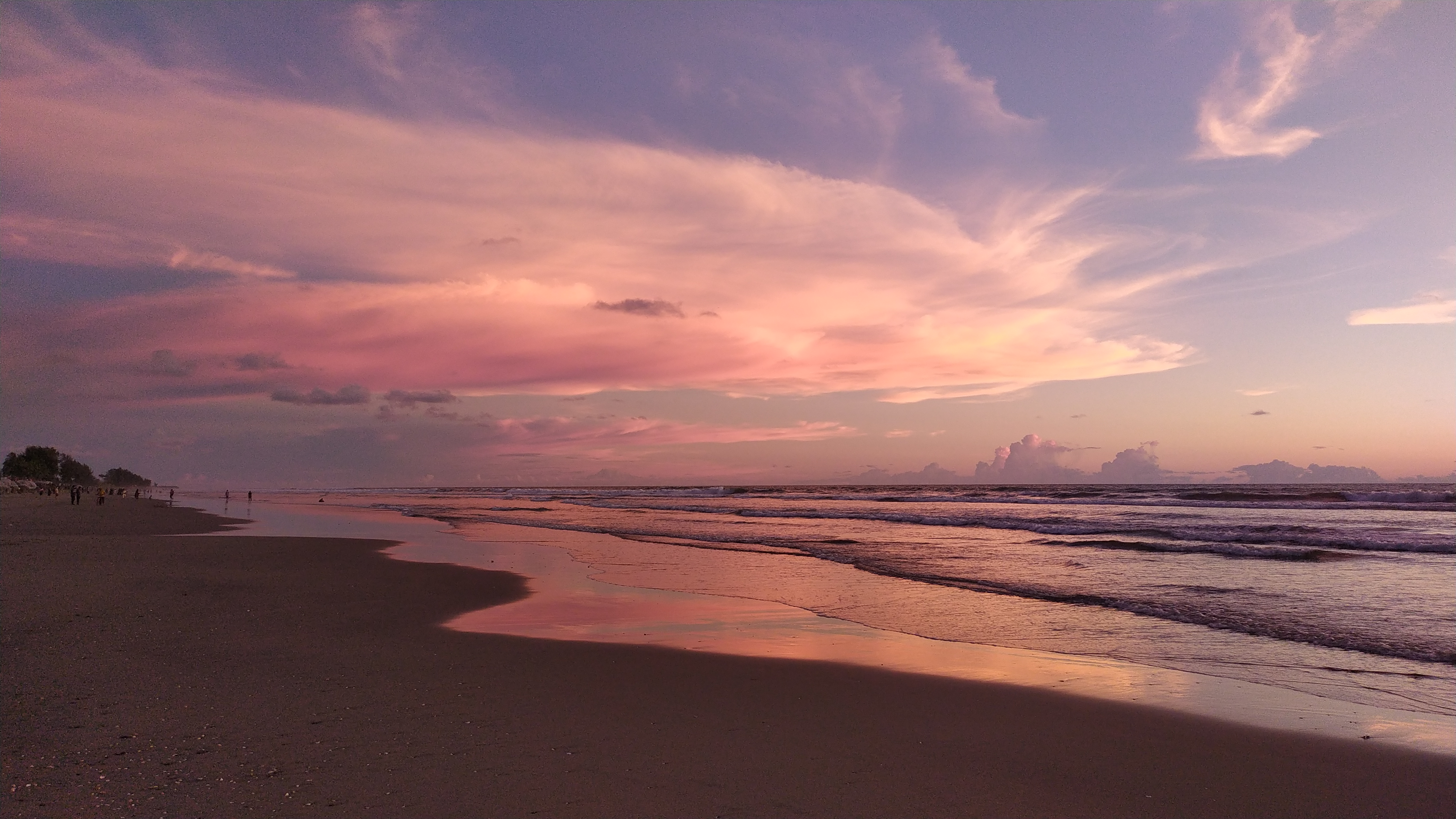
- Chittagong Port Sajek Valley Boga Lake Bandarban St. Martin's Island Himchari National Park Teknaf Beach

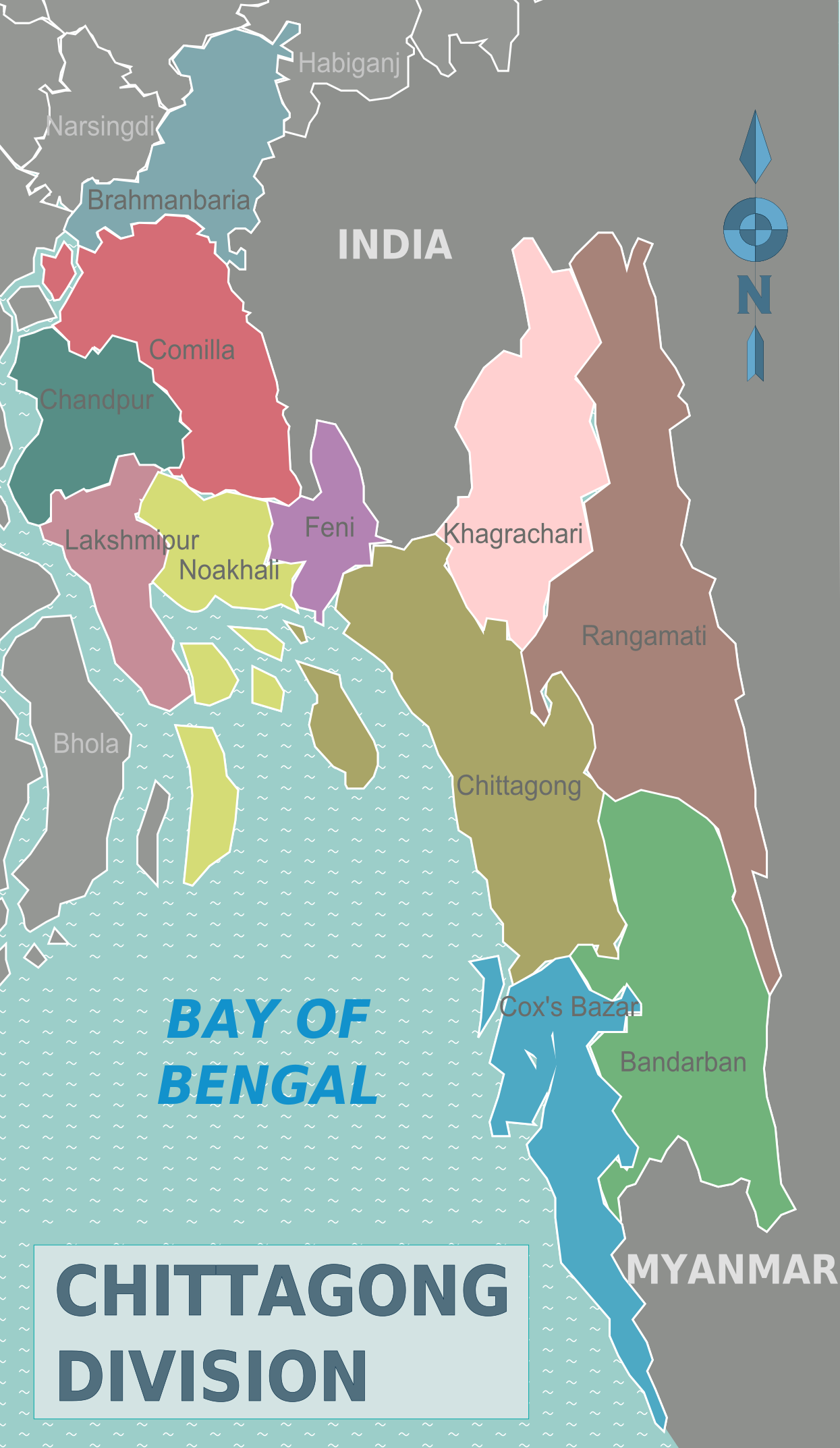
- Coordinates: 22°55′N 91°30′E
- Country: Bangladesh
- Established: 1829
- Capital and largest city: Chittagong

Government
  - Divisional Commissioner: Muhammad Ziauddin
  - Parliamentary constituency: Jatiya Sangsad (58 seats)

Area
  - Division of Bangladesh: 34,529.97 km^{2} (13,332.10 sq mi)

Population (2022)
  - Division of Bangladesh: 33,202,357 (Enumerated)
  - Density: 961.5519/km^{2} (2,490.408/sq mi)
  - Urban: 11,180,333
  - Rural: 22,016,799
  - Metro: 3,670,740
  - Adjusted Population: 34,178,612

Languages
  - Official language: Bengali • English
  - Regional language: Chittagonian • Noakhali
  - Indigenous minority languages: List: Bawm; Chakma; Marma; Mru; Kokborok; Mizo; Chawk; Khimi; Kuki; Tanchangya

Religion (2022)
  - Religion: List: 90.11% Islam; 6.61% Hinduism; 2.92% Buddhism; 0.22% Christians; 0.14% other
- Time zone: UTC+6 (BST)
- ISO 3166 code: BD-B
- Notable sport teams: Chattogram Challengers, Chittagong Division Cricket Team, Chittagong Abahani, Comilla Victorians, Noakhali Express
- Districts: 11
- Sub-Districts: 103
- Union Councils: 949
- Website: www.chittagongdiv.gov.bd

Chittagong Division (Bengali: চট্টগ্রাম বিভাগ), officially Chattogram Division, is geographically the largest of the eight administrative Divisions of Bangladesh. It covers the southeasternmost areas of the country, with a total area of 34,529.97 km^{2} (13,332.10 sq mi) and a population according to the 2022 census of 33,202,326, which made it the second most populous division of Bangladesh and the 45th most populous subnational entity in the world — more populous than all but 43 other countries. Chittagong Division is home to Cox's Bazar, the longest natural sea beach in the world; as well as St. Martin's Island, Bangladesh's sole coral reef.

== History ==
Chittagong as an administrative division was established in 1829 to serve as an administrative headquarters for five of Bengal's easternmost districts, with the Chittagong District serving as its headquarters. In East Pakistan, the division's Tippera district was renamed as Comilla District in 1960.

In 1984, fifteen districts were created by separating and reducing the original five districts of Chittagong, Comilla, Hill Tracts, Noakhali and Sylhet:

- The Chittagong District was divided into two districts; Chittagong and Cox's Bazar District
- The Comilla District was split into three districts; Comilla, Brahmanbaria and Chandpur
- The Hill Tracts District was split into three districts; Bandarban, Khagrachhari and Rangamati
- The Noakhali District was divided into three districts; Noakhali, Lakshmipur and Feni
- The Sylhet District was split into four districts; Sylhet, Habiganj, Moulvibazar and Sunamganj.

Sylhet, Habiganj, Moulvibazar and Sunamganj districts were moved from the Chittagong Division to create the newly established Sylhet Division in 1995.

== Administration ==
Chittagong Division is presently subdivided into eleven districts (zilas) and thence into 100 sub-districts (upazilas). The first six districts listed below comprise the north-western portion (with 37.6% of the area, but 58.3% of the population) of the present Chittagong Division, while the remaining five comprise the south-eastern portion (62.4% of the area, 41.7% of the population), the two portions being separated by the lower (or Bangladeshi) stretch of the Feni River; the upland districts of Khagrachhari, Rangamati and Bandarban together comprise that area previously known as the Chittagong Hill Tracts. The six districts in the north-west will now form the new Cumilla Division.

Districts
Name	Headquarters	Area (km^{2})	Population 1991 Census	Population 2001 Census	Population 2011 Census	Population 2022 Census
Brahmanbaria District	Brahmanbaria	1,881.20	2,141,745	2,398,254	2,840,498	3,306,563
Cumilla District	Cumilla	3,146.30	4,032,666	4,595,539	5,387,288	6,212,216
Chandpur District	Chandpur	1,645.32	2,032,449	2,271,229	2,416,018	2,635,748
Lakshmipur District	Lakshmipur	1,440.39	1,312,337	1,489,901	1,729,188	1,938,111
Noakhali District	Maijdee	3,685.87	2,217,134	2,577,244	3,108,083	3,625,252
Feni District	Feni	990.36	1,096,745	1,240,384	1,437,371	1,648,896
Khagrachhari District	Khagrachhari	2,749.16	342,488	525,664	613,917	714,119
Rangamati District	Rangamati	6,116.11	401,388	508,182	595,979	647,587
Bandarban District	Bandarban	4,479.01	230,569	298,120	388,335	481,109
Chittagong District	Chittagong	5,282.92	5,296,127	6,612,140	7,616,352	9,169,464
Cox's Bazar District	Cox's Bazar	2,491.85	1,419,260	1,773,709	2,289,990	2,823,265
Total Districts	11	34,529.97	20,552,908	24,290,384	28,423,019	33,202,326

== Demographics ==
Religions in Chittagong Division
Religion	Percent
Muslims	90.11%
Hindus	6.61%
Buddhists	2.92%
Christians	0.22%
Others	0.14%

According to the 2022 Census of Bangladesh, Chittagong Division had 7,528,333 households and a population of 33,202,326, 33.7% of whom lived in urban areas. The population density was 979 people per km^{2}. 90.11% were Muslims, 6.61% Hindus, 2.92% Buddhists, 0.22% Christians and 0.14% others.

== See also ==
- Divisions of Bangladesh
