= Jumma (people) =

Term used to refer the indigenous peoples of the Chittagong Hill Tracts

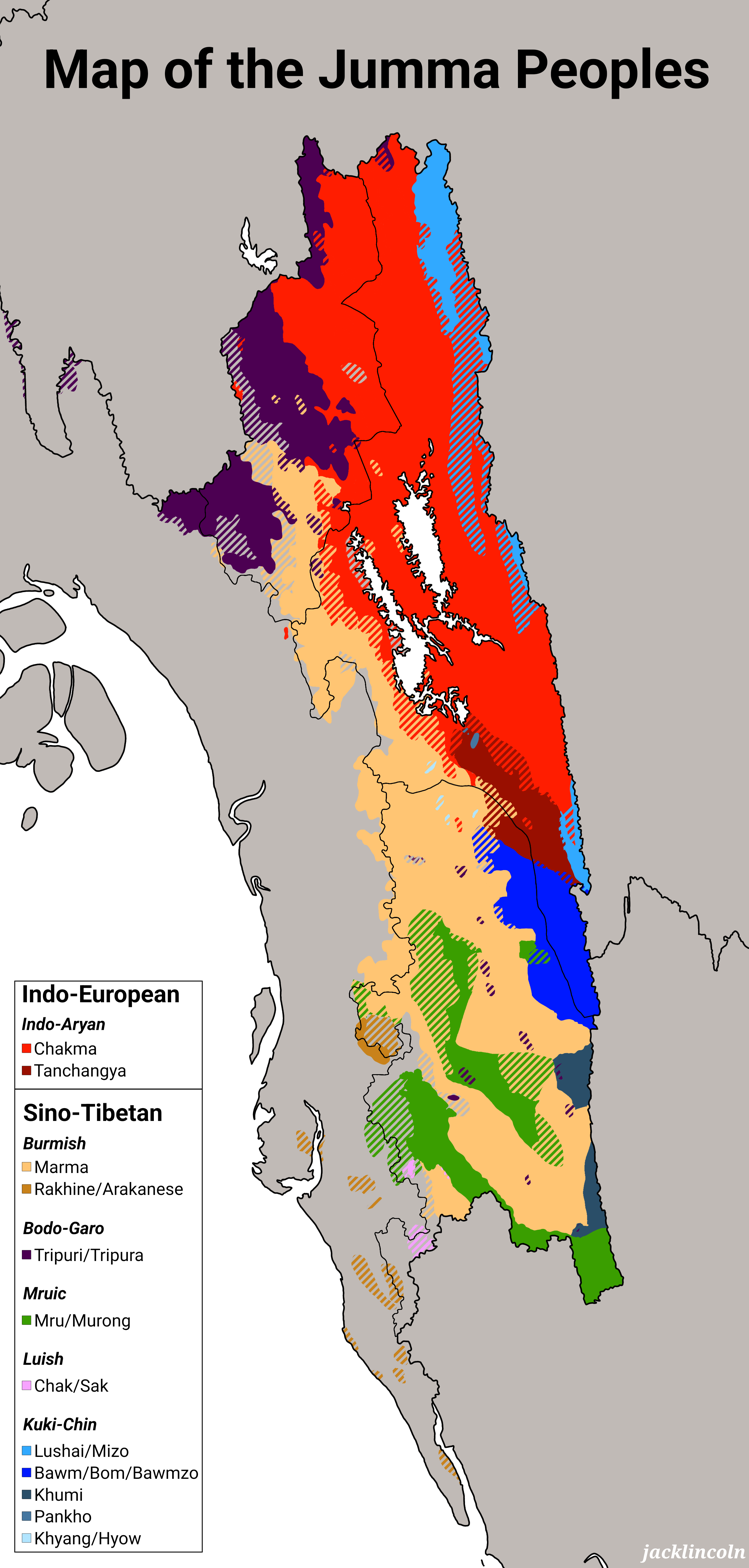
- A map showing the ethnicities described as "Jumma"

Total population
- 920,248

Regions with significant populations
- Bangladesh

Languages
- Chakma, Rakhine, Marma, Kokborok, Tanchangya, Chak, Pankho, Mru, Bawm, Mizo, Khyang, Khumi, Bengali, Chittagonian

Religion
- Majority: Theravada Buddhism; Minority: Christianity; Islam; Hinduism

Related ethnic groups
- Chakma, Rakhine, Marma, Tripuri, Tanchangya, Chak, Pankho, Mru, Bawm, Lushai, Khyang, Khumi

The term Jumma (from Jhum cultivation, Bengali: জুম্ম), also called Pahari (Bengali: পাহাড়ি, lit. 'Hill people') by Bengalis, usually refers to the indigenous tribal peoples of the Chittagong Hill Tracts region of Bangladesh. They include the Chakma, Arakanese (Rakhine), Marma, Tripuri, Tanchangya, Chak, Pankho, Mru, Bawm, Lushai, Khyang, and Khumi.

With the exception of the relatively well-integrated Chakma and Tanchangya, most of the peoples referring themselves Jumma are native speakers of Tibeto-Burman languages, unrelated to the Bengali language spoken by ethnic Bengalis. They are religiously and culturally distinct as well, with most being Buddhists, some Hindus, and some being converted Christians and Muslims. In addition, they have retained some traditional religious practices.

== Etymology ==
The ethnonym "Jumma" is commonly linked to the vernacular term jum or jhum (traditional farming method) for swidden or shifting cultivation, a predominant agricultural practice across many hill groups and was later adopted as a political pan-ethnic identity during the late 20th century. Scholarship also stresses that the modern usage of "Jumma" incorporates political mobilization and is not merely a neutral anthropological label.

== Ethnicity ==
There are twelve ethnic groups in Chittagong Hill Tracts who are termed as Jumma People. Chakma is the largest ethnic group living mainly in north CHT. Marma are the second largest ethnic group living mainly in south CHT. There are also Tripuri, Mru, Tanchangya, Bom, Rakhine, Chak, Khyang, Pankho, Lushei, and Khumi.

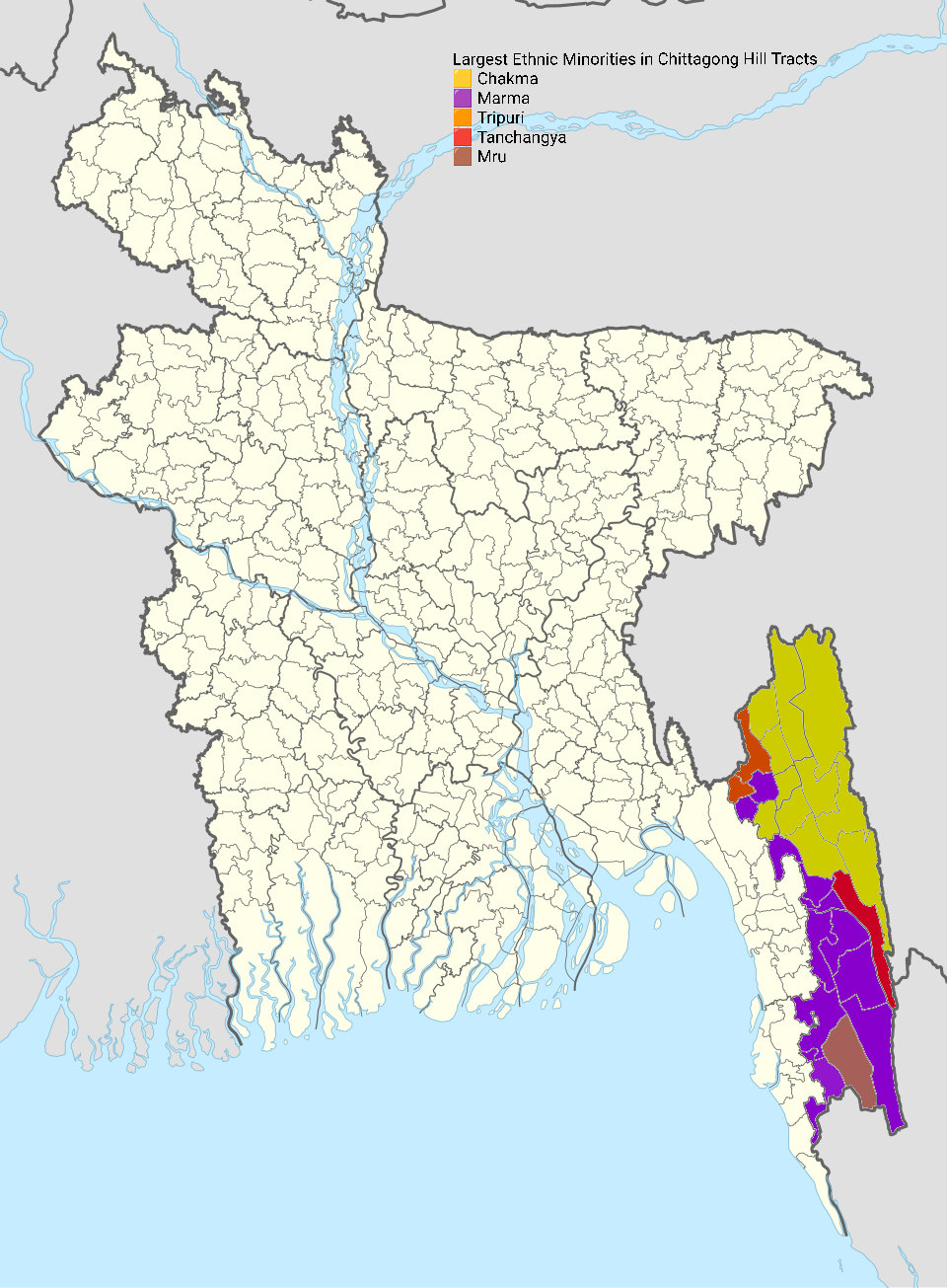
Largest Ethnic Minorities in CHT by Upazila (excluding Bengali)

According to the census of 2022, the tribal population of the Rangamati District, Khagrachhari District, Bandarban District totaled 920,248. Population of ethnic minorities are: Chakma 454,925, Marma 209,783, Tripura 133,372, Mro 51,724, Tanchangya 42,943, Bom 12,311, Rakhine 11,195, Khyang 4,176, Khumi 3,341, Chak 2,725, Pankho 1,458 and Lushei 216.

Ethnic Minorities in the Chittagong Hill Tracts (excluding Bengali) (2022)
1. Chakma (48.8%)
2. Marma (22.5%)
3. Tripura (14.3%)
4. Mro (5.60%)
5. Tanchangya (4.60%)
6. Bom (1.30%)
7. Rakhine (1.20%)
8. Khyang (0.40%)
9. Khumi (0.40%)
10. Chak (0.30%)
11. Pankho (0.20%)
12. Lushei (0.10%)
13. Others (0.30%)

Lewin (1869) classified the Jumma peoples into two groups, Khyongtha (meaning children of the rivers), comprising the Chakma, Marma, Rakhine and Tripura (excluding Riang clan), who inhabited the valleys, and Toungtha (meaning children of the hills), comprising the Khumi, Mro, Lushai, Bawm, Pankhu, Kuki, Tanchangya, Riang and Chak who inhabited the hills and ridges.

== History ==
=== Pre-modern and regional contacts ===
Archaeological and historical research indicates the CHT were settled by Tibeto-Burman and other highland groups long before sustained lowland imperial control; different groups likely arrived in successive migration waves, forming distinct communities such as the Chakma, Marma, Tripura, Mro, Bawm and others, each maintaining separate languages and clan systems. The upland communities had episodic contact, trade and tributary relations with neighbouring polities such as the Arakan (Rakhine) kingdom and the Twipra or Tripura states, but full incorporation into those coastal or plains empires was limited by the terrain and the social organisation of hill societies.

The region's mountainous terrain enabled these communities to develop autonomous village-based political systems, relying on customary law and collective land ownership rather than centralized imperial administration.

=== Mughal and early modern period (16th–18th centuries) ===
Parts of the greater Chittagong region fell under Mughal influence in the 17th century, but the hill tracts largely remained autonomous with customary law governing land and authority in most villages.

=== British colonial administration ===
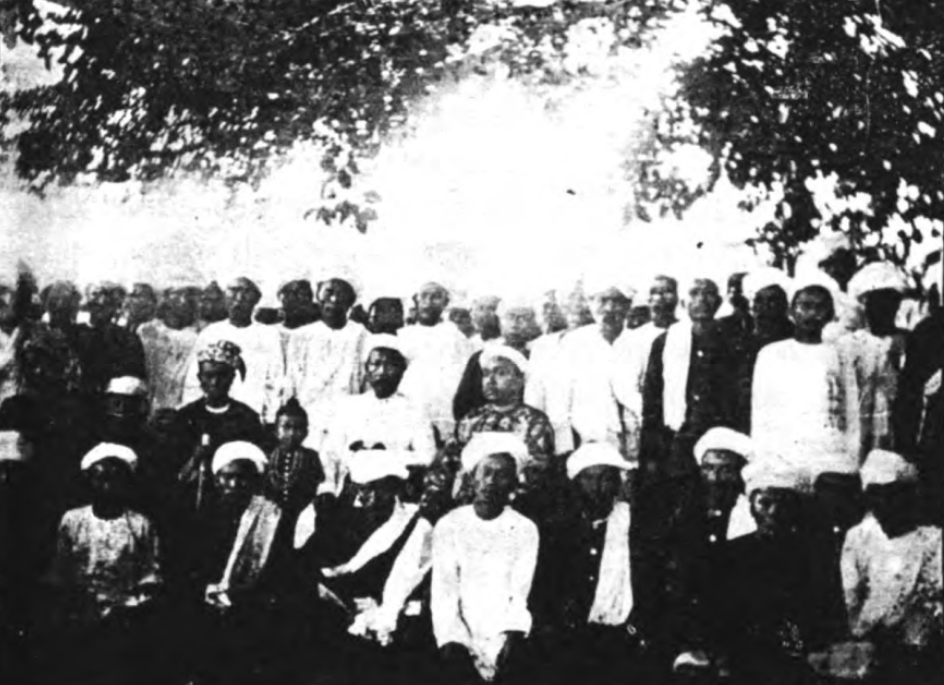
Bohmong Circle chief with Marma subjects, 1906

The British annexed the Chittagong region in phases during the 18th and 19th centuries and recognising the distinctiveness of the hills, treated the CHT as a frontier zone with a separate administrative and legal regime that acknowledged customary authorities and limited outsider settlement. Colonial regulations and the creation of distinct land categories and chiefdom recognition altered local governance even as many customary practices were left in place.

=== Pakistan Period ===
During the construction of the Kaptai Dam, more than 18,000 families and 100,000 tribal people were evicted by then Pakistani president Ayub Khan without appropriate resettlement facilities or compensation. More than 40,000 Chakma tribals emigrated to Arunachal Pradesh, India. Consequently, the Jummas began a grudge against the government due to their distress.

=== Bangladesh Liberation War ===
In 1971, most of the Jummas were neutral or in support of Bangladeshi independence, with the exception of the majority of the Chakma people, who were against the independence of Bangladesh under the leadership of Chakma circle chief Raja Tridev Roy.

=== Independent Bangladesh ===
Between 1978 and 1990, the ruling government saw the Jummas as traitors and a potential risk for an independent Bangladesh. Allegedly, 400,000 Bengali homeless people were relocated in the Chittagong Hill Tracts with homes, arable land, and food rationing. It causes tension between Bengali settlers and tribal groups. Between 1979 and 1997, over 15 major conflict took place between Bengali settlers and minority tribes where government agencies have allegation to support Bengali settlers. Due to the outbreaks of violence, communal and social unrest, many Jummas fled to the Indian states of Mizoram and Tripura, or to Myanmar.

In 1996, peace negotiations were initiated by then Prime Minister of Bangladesh Sheikh Hasina and a peace accord was finalised and formally signed on 2 December 1997.

== Diaspora and migration ==
Conflict, displacement and economic pressures produced internal and cross-border movements. Large numbers of Chakma and members of other groups sought refuge in the Indian states of Tripura, Mizoram and Arunachal Pradesh in the 1960s and again during later periods of violence; many refugees experienced protracted statelessness or ambiguous legal status in host regions. Repatriation and return have been uneven, and diaspora communities preserve kin networks, religious institutions and cultural festivals across borders.

== Culture ==
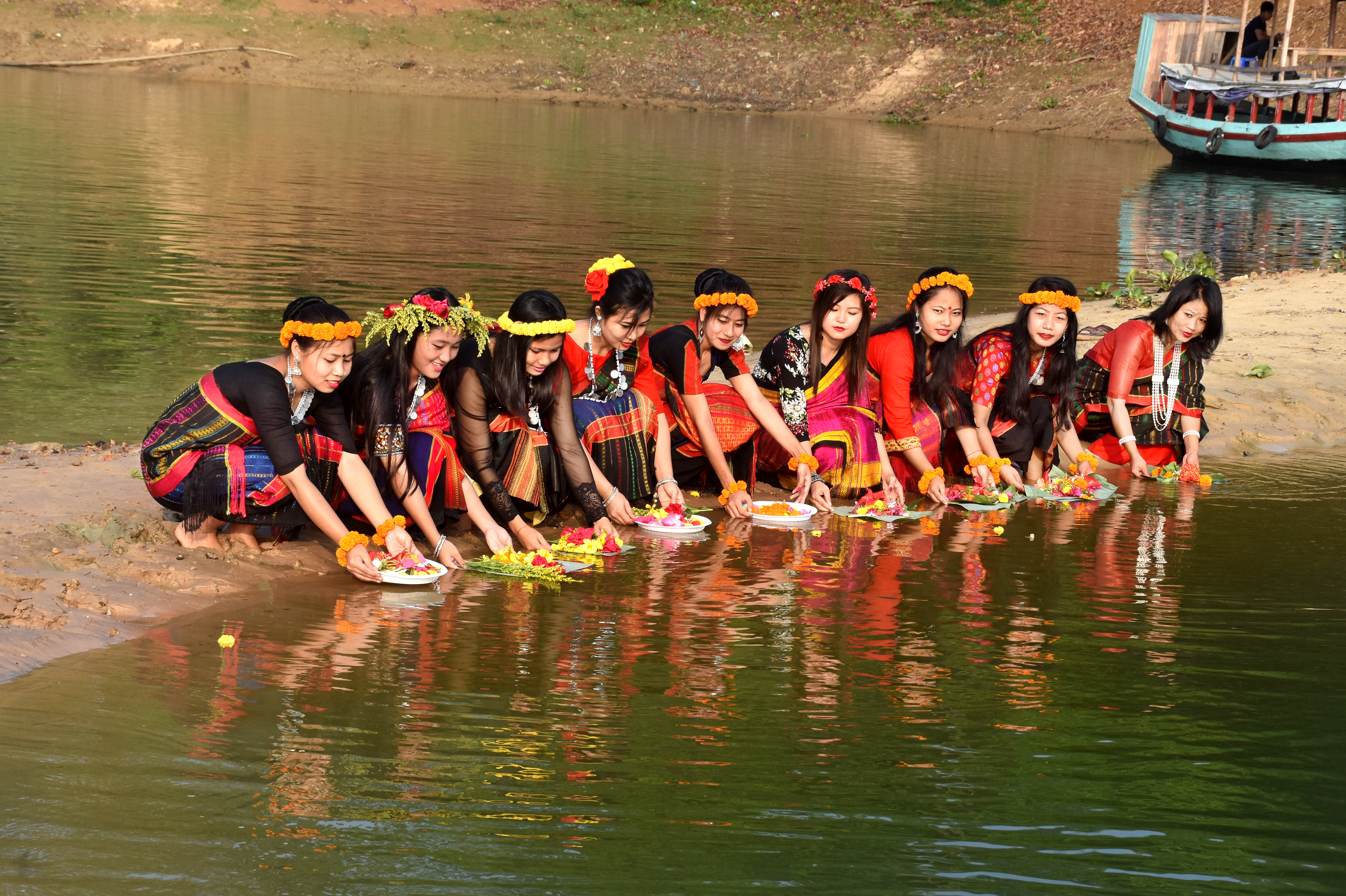
Chakma girls offering flowers for Bizhu in Kaptai Lake

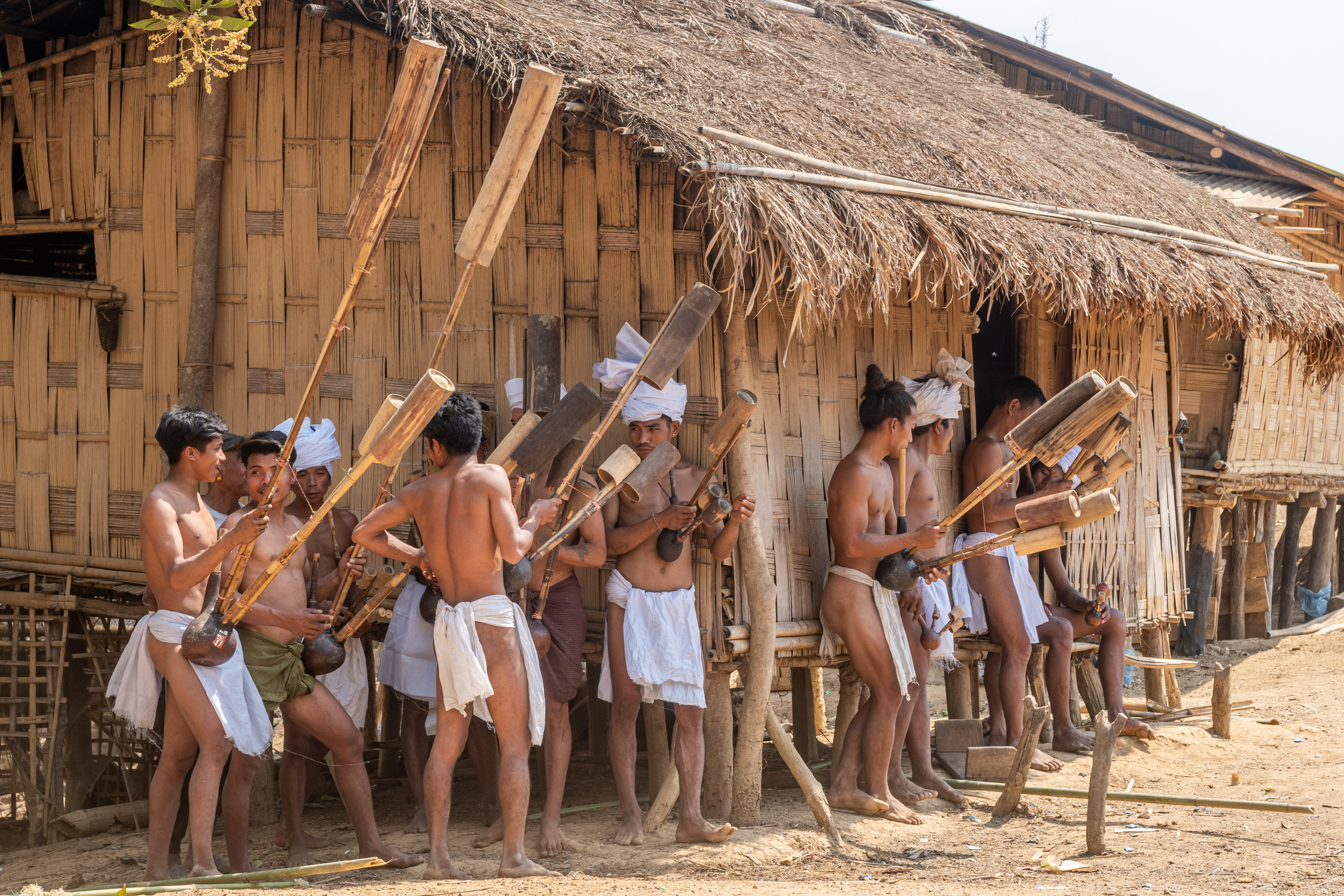
Mru youths in traditional attire preparing for Go festival

Subsistence agriculture based on shifting cultivation (jhum), terraced and paddy gardening, fishing, hunting and foraging was historically central to livelihoods, while crafts (weaving, bamboo/cane products), small trade and increasingly wage labour supplement household economies. Development projects, land alienation and shortened fallow cycles have undermined jhum systems and created new vulnerabilities.

The Jumma peoples are culturally heterogeneous; while groups share some upland livelihoods and material culture they have distinct languages, ritual repertoires, dress codes and social institutions.

Across groups, cycle-based agricultural festivals, clan exogamy rules, communal labour systems and strong oral traditions are widespread, and customary village councils or chiefs remain a locus of dispute resolution and ritual authority in many communities.

The largest cultural festival of these people is Baisabi. It's the new year festival of the Jumma people. The name has been taken from first three syllables of the new year festival of three major ethics groups in the Chittagong hill tracts: Baishu of Tripuris, Shangrai of Marmas and Rakhines, and Biju of Chakmas. The festival is celebrated for three days and typically fells on 12 to 14 April, along with Bengali New Year.

The Chittagong Hill Tracts has languages from several families. Chakma and Tanchangya languages are Indo-European. While every other languages are Sino-Tibetan. and language shift are common in contacts with Bengali and each other.

Several comunities celebrate new-year/harvest festivals with dancing, ritual food and offerings; for example the Chakma and Tripuri Bizu (also spelled Biju) festival marks the new year and harvest renewal, while Marma communities observe rituals linked to Theravada Buddhist calendars often analogous to the Thingyan/Water Festival of neighbouring Myanmar. Traditional performance genres (song, bamboo instruments, communal dance) and textile weaving are important markers of group identity.

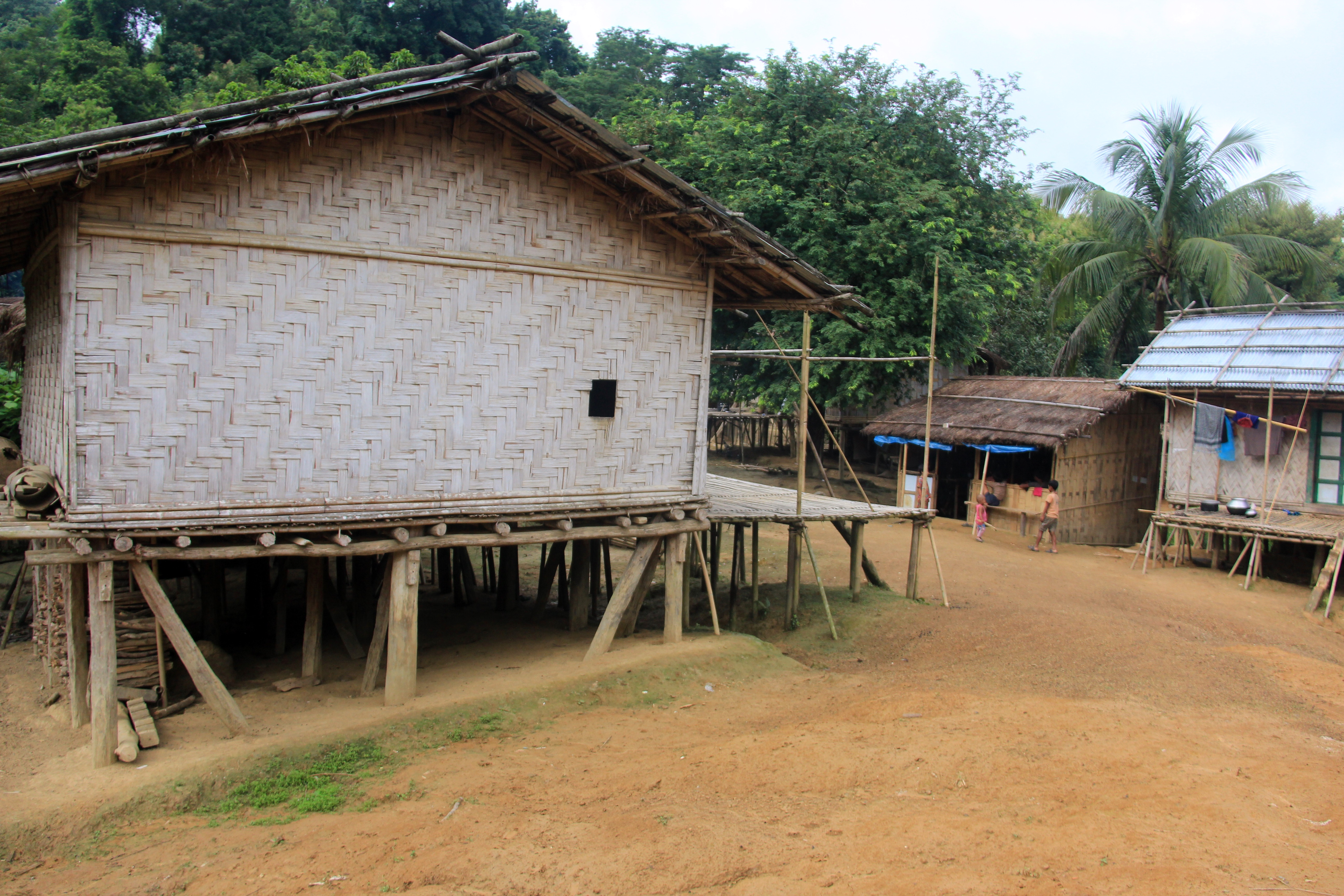
Traditional houses in a Marma village

Handloom textiles, bamboo and cane craft, woodwork and household ceramics are central crafts; woven garments and ornamentation often encode clan or status markers and are used in rites of passage.

Traditional performance genres-vocal polyphony, bamboo instruments, circle and line dances, feature in seasonal festivals; folk games and competitive activities tied to harvest celebrations persist though many are under pressure from modern leisure forms.

== Economy ==
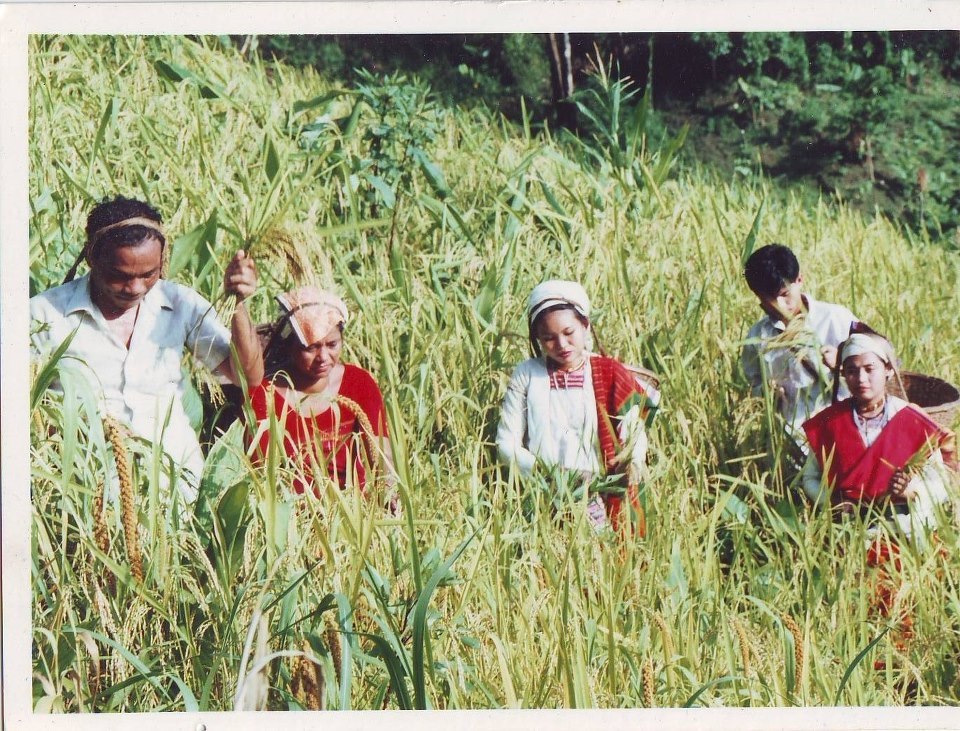
Tanchangya farmers harvesting

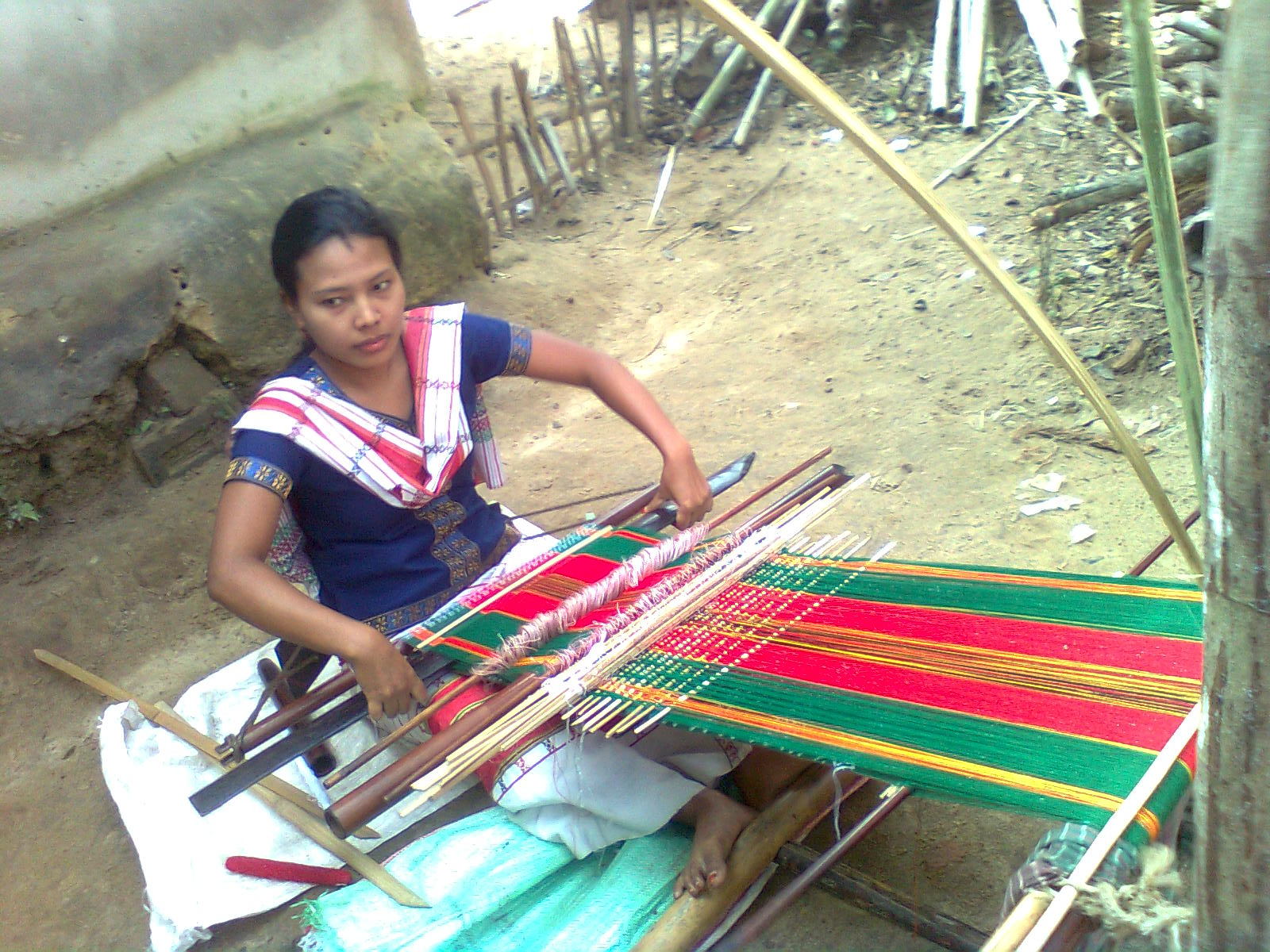
A Tripuri woman weaving handloom

Historically, the Jumma economy has been oriented to subsistence mixed farming, combining shifting cultivation (jhum), terraced plots and riverine fishing, with supplementary cash income from craftwork and seasonal labour. Handloom weaving, bamboo and cane products, small trade and seasonal wage migration to lowland towns supplement household economies.

Large infrastructure projects and state-led settlement policies, most notably the Kaptai reservoir and resettlement drives, removed land from traditional use and are widely cited as a proximate cause of dispossession, migration and long-term economic marginalisation. Studies of land law and juridical pluralism document the tensions between statutory land regimes and customary tenure that drive many disputes.

== Cuisine ==
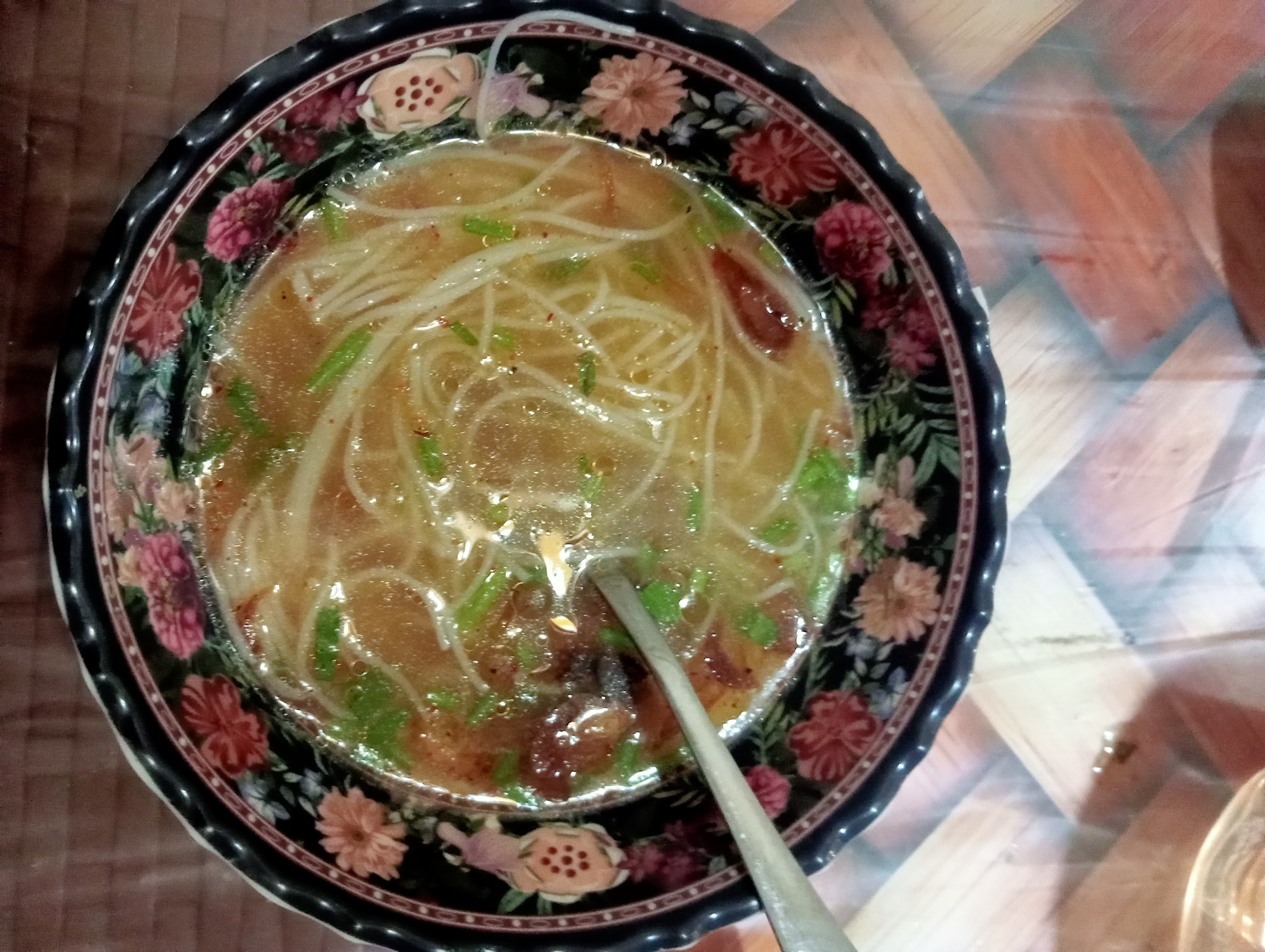
Mundi, a popular dish among the Jumma communities

Jumma diets are shaped by jhum agro-ecosystems, rice is the staple, supplemented by vegetables, tubers, wild greens, bamboo shoots, pulses, fish and occasional meat. Preservation techniques such as smoking, drying and fermentation (preserved bamboo shoots, fermented fish pastes) broaden seasonal food security and provide characteristic flavours. Bamboo shoots (fresh, fermented or dried) are common across groups, and many local vegetable varieties, greens and indigenous cereals are grown in jhum plots. Specific ceremonial or festival dishes vary by group; ethnographic studies record rice-based communal plates, meat or fish stews, and special preparations reserved for rituals and hospitality.

There are various Jumma dishes. Chakma cuisine features rice, fish and local vegetables, ceremonial dishes appear during Biju and other rituals. Marma food traditions include bamboo-cooked meats and sticky rice; fermented fish called nappi and river fishes are common. Tripuri communities maintain their own rice and vegetable specialities tied to the Baisu festival. Mro, Bom, Khumi, Chak and other smaller groups preserve distinctive foraged foods, herbal medicines and festival dishes documented in local ethnographies.

== See also ==
- Chittagong Hill Tracts conflict
- Indigenous peoples of Bangladesh
- Ethnic groups in the Chittagong Hill Tracts
- Demographics of Bangladesh
