= Ethnic minorities in Bangladesh =

Ethnic minorities in Bangladesh mostly live in Chittagong Hill Tracts (southeastern), Sylhet Division (northeastern), Rajshahi Division (west), and Mymensingh Division (north-central). Assumed as ethnic groups and tribal races, total population of ethnic minorities in the country was estimated to be over 2 million in 2010. They are diverse communities including Tibeto-Burman, Austric, Dravidian and Indo-Aryan peoples.

According to the Ethnologue, there are 36 indigenous living linguistic communities, which include 17 Sino-Tibetan, 10 Indo-European, 7 Austro-Asiatic and 2 Dravidian language-speaking groups. Quite a few of these groups, such as the Chakmas and Marmas (the largest and second largest respectively), live in before the British period from modern Burma. Most of these groups are often disadvantaged compared to ethnic Bengalis since Bangladesh was created as a Bengali nation-state. Ethnic minorities of Bangladesh have their own cultural traditions and, frequently, languages. Vast number of ethnic tribes of Bangladesh are traditionally Buddhists and Hindus by faith while others are largely Christians and small animists.

The government of Bangladesh has referred to the Chittagong Hill Tracts' non-Bengali ethnic groups as such, rather than indigenous people.

== Population ==
The primary census report of 2011 gives number of ethnic population groups of Bangladesh as 27. The first is Chakma, consisting of 444,748 people while the Marma, the second largest ethnic group compares with 202,974 people.

Ethnic minorities in Bangladesh (2022)
1. Chakma (29.3%)
2. Marma (13.6%)
3. Tripuri (9.49%)
4. Santal (7.82%)
5. Oraon (5.20%)
6. Garo (4.66%)
7. Munda (3.65%)
8. Mro (3.18%)
9. Tanchangya (2.79%)
10. Barman (2.71%)
11. Monipuri (1.39%)
12. Kurmi Mahato (1.17%)
13. Malo/Ghasimalo (0.90%)
14. Koch (0.83%)
15. Bom (0.80%)
16. Khasia/Khasi (0.75%)
17. Bagdi (0.73%)
18. Rakhain (0.68%)
19. Bhumij (0.59%)
20. Pahari/Mal Pahari (0.53%)
21. Others (9.25%)

Population of minority tribal community of Bangladesh (2022 census)
Tribal communities	Population
Bagdi	12,092
Banai	2,851
Barman	44,657
Bedia	7,207
Bhil	95
Bhuimali	1,930
Bhumij	9,664
Bom	13,193
Boraik/Baraik	3,444
Chak	3,077
Chakma	483,299
Dalu	386
Garo	76,846
Gonju	4,137
Gorait	2,727
Gurkha	100
Hajong	7,996
Ho	223
Hudi	1,503
Kharia	3,099
Kharwar/Kherwar	312
Khasia/Khasi	12,421
Khyang	4,826
Khumi	3,780
Koch	13,702
Kol	3,822
Kondo	1,898
Kora	816
Lohar	3,418
Lusai	380
Mahali	6,614
Kurmi Mahato	19,271
Malo/Ghasimalo	14,771
Marma	224,261
Monipuri	22,978
Mro	52,455
Munda	60,191
Musahar	4,600
Oraon	85,846
Pahari/Mal Pahari	8,801
Pankhoa/Pankho	1,857
Patro	3,100
Rajoar	2,327
Rakhain	11,195
Santal	129,049
Sabar	1,980
Teli	2,082
Tanchangya	45,972
Tripuri	156,578
Turi	3,792
Others	68,538
Total	1,650,159

== Major ethnic group ==
=== Chakmas ===
The Chakmas are the largest ethnic minority group of Bangladesh. Buddhism is the most common religion within the tribe. They refer to their tribal chief as Chakma Raja or Sardar. Chakmas are considered more privileged than most other tribal Bangladeshi tribes. They speak Chakma, an Indo-Aryan language; and have distinctive culture, tradition, and ethnic history. Women wear pinon-hadi and men wear dhuti. They grow crops via a special eco-friendly method called "Karpas Jhum cultivation".

=== Marmas ===
Marmas are the second largest ethnic group in Bangladesh and they are of Burmese (Myanmar) ancestry. The Marmas regarded Burma (Myanmar) as the centre of their cultural life. They are regarded as the descendants of the Rakhine people. The region they inhabited before was the Kingdom of Mrauk U, which was later conquered by the Konbaung Dynasty. For a time being, the kingdom also functioned as a vassal state of the Bengal Sultanate. Their cultural traits are connected to their ancestral heritage, including dress (which is called thumbui—the lower part, and angi—the upper part), food (mostly spicy, sour, and hot), writing (Burmese script), traditional songs and musical instruments (for example, kappya, jjea, and kharra). They speak Marma, and the majority are Theravada Buddhist. They have many festivals during the year, but Sangrai is regarded as the biggest celebration among them. It is a tradition to welcome the new year according to the Buddhist lunar calendar. This festival held for three days, and the popular ritual during the second and third day of the festival is to splash water on each other. They believe that the water takes away all the sorrow and pure up our soul and body, so one must to greet others (even strangers) by splashing water on them. But the culture of marma is unique. It has also their own language, tradition, culture etc.

=== Tripura/Tripuri ===
The Tripuris are one of the major ethnic community living both in the plains and the Chittagong Hill Tracts in Bangladesh. During the partition of the Indian subcontinent, the princely state of Tripura were merged neither into India nor Pakistan. However, Tripura Kingdom was merged in 1949 with India through a merger agreement. The peoples of Tripura, both in Bangladesh and the Indian State of Tripura, shared common culture, history, tradition, and way of life. Tripuri language is called Kokborok, of which there are more than one million speakers. Tripuri's main festival is Buishu.

A minority of Tripuris have adopted Islam as their religion and have been subject to violence by some Tripuri Christians. On 18 June 2021, a Tripuri imam and farmer called Omar Faruq Tripura (formerly known as Bennichand Tripura) of Tulajhiri Aga Tripurapara was shot whilst heading home from Isha prayers at a makeshift mosque. Five out of the 38 families in this Tripurapara are Muslims and the rest are Christians.

=== Tanchangya ===
The Tanchangya (তঞ্চংগ্যা) people are one of 13 ethnic communities living in the Chittagong Hill Tracts (CHT).

Due to lack of research, there is also confusion about the numbers of Tanchangyas. According to census of 2001 there are 31,164 Tanchangya in CHT (source: solidarity2002, Bangladesh Adivasi Forum).

=== Mrus ===
The Mru people (also Mro and Moorang) are considered the original inhabitants of the Chittagong Hills where they migrated from Arakan of Burma from the 14th–15th century. They lived on valleys and often fortified their villages. They had no written language of their own, but some could read the Burmese and Bengali scripts. Most of them claimed to be Buddhists, but their religious practices were largely animistic.

=== Santals ===
The Santal people are one of the largest and most ancient ethnic groups in the Indian Subcontinent. They are descendants of one of the oldest Austric-speaking Proto-Austaloid populations.

The Santals are known as one of the oldest and largest ethnic communities in the northwestern belt of Bangladesh.

Santals are largely seen in the northern districts of Dinajpur, Naogaon, Thakurgaon, Panchagarh, etc. They have actively participated in the Tebhaga movement led by Ila Mitra in 1950, the Santal revolt, Birsa Munda Uprising, Kol revolt, Jitu Samur Rebellion, Pandu Raja Insurgency, Swadeshi Movement and the War of Liberation in 1971.

Santal women wear ornaments on their hands, feet, nose, ears and neck and also wear peculiarly shaped ornaments on their ankles. They fix flowers on their heads and hair-buns, and make themselves graceful with simple ornaments.

Their dress is also very simple. Santal dresses are called panchi, panchatat and matha. The Santal women wear coarse homespun cotton sarees of bright colours that barely reach their knees, while the upper end is flung over the shoulders. Santal men and women wear tattoos on their bodies. Most of their houses are usually neat and clean even though built of mud. Their homestead often includes a garden.

The peculiarity of the houses is that they have small and low doors and almost no window. There is practically no furniture except a wooden bedstead and bamboo machang on which the people of the comparatively well-to-do class spread their beds.

The Nabanna ceremony is of importance to the rural people, and is observed during the harvest time when delicious preparations from newly harvested food grains are made and friends and relatives are entertained. Santals have their own language, culture and social patterns, which are clearly distinct from those of other tribes. They speak Bangla fluently and have adopted many Bangla words for their own language. Most Santals are Christians now but they still observe their old tribal rites.

Agriculture is their main source of livelihood. Principal food items of Santals are rice, fish and vegetables. They also eat crabs, pork, chicken, beef and the meat of squirrels. Jute spinach (nalita) is one of their favourite food items. Eggs of ducks, chickens, birds and turtles are delicacies in their menu. Liquor distilled from putrefied rice called hadia or (pachai) is their favourite drink. Santal women are skilled in making different kinds of cakes.

Most of the Santals are animists. The main weapon used for hunting and self-protection is the bow and arrow made of locally available materials. They are fond of flowers and music. Hunting and collecting food from the forest were their primitive economic activity.

Santals are divided into twelve clans and all these clans are fond of festivities. They are very proficient in music and dance. Like Bengalis, they also have 'thirteen festivals in twelve months' and many other festive occasions around the year. Their year starts with the month of Falgun (roughly, 15 February – 15 March). Almost each month or season has a festival celebrated with dances, songs and music. In the spring, Santals celebrate holi when they drench each other with colours. To express gratitude to the god of crops is also a part of this festival. It turns into a carnival with dances, songs, music and food and drinks. Probably its greatest attraction is the choral dance of Santal girls. Another important ceremony of Santals is called Baha or the festival of blossoms. The purpose of this festival at the beginning of spring is to welcome and offer greetings to the freshly blossoming flowers. It is also characterised by dancing, singing and music. The Santals cremate their dead bodies. But nowadays, many of them bury the dead. When an inhabitant of a village dies, the village headman's duty is to present himself at the place of the departed and arrange for the last rites with due respect.

=== Khasi people ===
The Khasi tribes, the majority of whom live in the State of Meghalaya (former Khasi Federate Kingdoms) in north east India, with small populations in neighbouring Assam, and in parts of Bangladesh. They call themselves Ki Hynñiew trep, which means "the seven huts" in the Khasi language. Their language Khasi is the northernmost Austroasiatic language. This language was essentially oral until the arrival of European missionaries. Particularly significant in this regard was a Welsh missionary, Thomas Jones, who transcribed the Khasi language into Roman Script. The Khasi people form the majority of the population of the eastern part of Meghalaya. A substantial minority of the Khasi people follow their tribal religion; called variously, Ka Niam Khasi and Ka Niam Tre in the Jaintia region and within that ethnic religious belief the rooster is sacrificed as a substitute for man, it being thought that the rooster "bears the sins of the man and by its sacrifice, man will obtain redemption" (compare Kapparot). Other religions practised include Presbyterian, Anglican, Unitarian, Roman Catholic and very few are Muslims. The Khasi people who reside in the hilly areas of Sylhet, Bangladesh are of the War sub-tribe. The main crops produced by the Khasi people living in the War areas, including Bangladesh, are betel leaf, areca nut and oranges. The War-Khasi people designed and built the living root bridges of the Cherrapunjee region. In several States of India, Khasis have been granted the status of Scheduled tribe. The Khasis are a matrilineal society.

=== Jaintia ===
Jaintia, an ethnic group living in Sylhet region and also known as Synteng or Pnar, have a very rich tradition and political history. Once they lived in the northern area of Sylhet. But after the Partition of Bengal in 1947, majority of them migrated to the Jaintia Hills in Assam where most of them are now settled. A small section of them are now living in Jaintapur Upazila in Sylhet. The Jaintias in Bangladesh constitute an ethnic group numbering about twenty thousand. According to the Anthropologists, Jaintia is one of the ancient original groups who migrated to the North Eastern region of the sub-continent and settled down there. There is a view holding that the Jaintia is a branch of the Khasi community. The Khasi is a branch of the Mon-khem race while Jaintia belongs to the Mongoloids. The similarity is consequent upon their co-existence for a long time and that similarity is confined in physical features only. No documentary evidences are available regarding the naming of the community. Some are of opinion that they are named after their principal goddess Joyanti. Devi Joyanti is an incarnation of Hindu goddess Durga. Jaintias also introduce themselves as Pnar. Jaintias have their own language, but no alphabets. The Jaintias in Bangladesh get education in the schools through the medium of Bangla. The literacy rate of the Jaintia is 80%, the highest among all tribes living in greater Sylhet region. At present many of them are serving in different government and private organisations. A number of children from Jaintia families are getting education at Shillong in Meghalaya. Though they use their mother tongue in conversation with their tribal people they speak in Bangla to communicate with others. The dress of the male members of both Jaintia and Khasi tribes is similar. However, the male members of Jaintia tribe living in Bangladesh wear same kind of dresses with the mainstream Bengali males. But the women wear the traditional Jaintia dresses. They cover the upper portion of the body with a piece of colourful decorated cloth. But the Jaintia ladies wear another piece of cloth as a modesty scarf knotted on the shoulder like Khasi women. Most of the Jaintia women are now accustomed to wear sari-blouses, although they prefer traditional attires at home. They are also fond of ornaments made of gold and silver. Agriculture is the main occupation of the Jaintias. They cultivate betel leaves and various nuts, which are used in local trading. The Jaintia society is matriarchal. Mothers dominate their respective families and children adopt the title of mother's clan. The women exclusively inherit the family property. The Jaintia society is divided into a number of tribes, such as Sarty, Nayang, Kayang, Lanong, Yangyoung, Rymbai, Dkhar etc. In spite of the existence of tribal system in the Jaintia society, caste discrimination is totally absent there. Intra tribal marriage is prohibited in Jaintia society. A social panchayet system settles disputes through arbitration. The arbitration is conducted under the chief panchayet and supported by the elders in the society. The decision of the panchayet is final in respect of any social problems. The chief of the panchayet is elected by the community.

Rice is the staple food of the Jaintias and they take it with various vegetables, fish and meat. Pork is their favourite dish. They also like mutton, chicken, milk and milk products. They are also used to drink tea, and they entertain guests with betel leaf and nuts. Locally brewed wine, known as kiad is popular among them. They like all the seasonal vegetables, especially bulbous plants and esculent roots. They consider dried fish as a delicacy. They cook their food like the Bengalis.

Hoktoi is the religious festival of the Jaintia. They celebrate the festival for two days. The event is celebrated by the Jaintia to pray for the peace of the soul who died and for the welfare of the next generation. They cook different kinds of foods and serve fruits to the guest. It has been said that, 'better the dance, better the crop' by the Jaintia people which has made them skilled in their own dimension of dancing. Such festivals are really part our culture which has made it more diversified.

Though pantheist in belief the Jaintias are much influenced by Hinduism. Their main deity is goddess Jayanti, an incarnation of Hindu goddess Durga. They worship their traditional gods and goddesses along with the Hindu gods and goddesses. But it is an exception that they don't have any specific temple or place of worship. They believe that their deities exist in nature and they offer their prayer in open air. They also believe in the eternal existence of a creator with whom the human being had a direct link at an initial stage. But when they started to be driven by selfish motives, they could not see God with their eyes as He disappeared. Thus the human beings became busy with their families and worldly affairs so much that they started forgetting God gradually as the relationship weakens. So God advised them to follow a few moral sayings to live in the world in a modest way. The directives of God were: (a) earn honestly (Kamai ia ka hok), (b) know the people, understand God (Tipbru-Tipblai) and (c) know both the lineages of your parents (Tipkur-Tipkha). Jaintias also believe that God had sent some gods and goddesses on earth to control the indisciplined human being. They keep them in their control by imposing illness and diseases. Jaintias also worship those gods and goddesses to mitigate their rage. They have their own conception of sins and piety, heaven and hell, crime and punishment. However, some of them have embraced Christianity.

=== Garos ===
The Garos are a Tibeto-Burman ethnic group of the Indian subcontinent, found principally in the Indian states of Meghalaya, Assam, Tripura, and West Bengal, and in Bangladesh. They call themselves Achik (literally "hill man") or Mande ("the man"). Garo society is matrilineal. Traditionally they have been animists, but some now follow Christianity as the result of missionary activity. They celebrate the Wangala agricultural festival.

=== Manipuri ===
The Meitei people, also known as the Manipuris, are one of the major ethnic communities of Bangladesh. They migrated to Bangladesh during the reign of Manipuri king Rajarshi Bhagyachandra (Meitei: Ching-Thang Khomba) (1764–1789) and the process was accelerated by the Manipuri-Burma war. After the war with Burma, Manipur was ruled by the Burmese invaders for about seven years. During that period, King Chourajit Singh accompanied by a large following of Manipuri subjects moved to areas – now in Bangladesh. At present they live in different places of Sylhet Division, like Kamalganj, Sreemongal, Kulaura and Baralekha thanas of Moulvi Bazar district; Chunarughat thana of Habiganj district and Chhatak thana of Sunamganj district. According to the 1991 population census, there were about 25,000 Manipuris in Bangladesh. As a result of their changing geographical locations and various kinds of religious and political interaction. Meitei language (officially called Manipuri language), the mother-tongue of the Manipuris belongs to the meitei group of the Tibeto-Burman sub-family of the Sino-Tibetan family of languages. Meitei literature (Manipuri literature) is very old. It has a rich and variegated history and traditions. A characteristic of the old Meitei script (Manipuri script) is that each letter of the alphabet has been named after a part of the human body. The shape of a letter is also based on the body part it is named after. Some books on Manipuri subjects have been published in Bengali. Manipuri men and women work together in the field. Men clear the jungles and till the soil, while the women sow seeds and do the transplanting. They celebrate seed planting and crop harvesting in their own colourful way. Manipuri culture has a rich and colourful tradition where dance and music play a vital role. The most vibrant branch of Manipuri culture is dance. Rasa dance is the finest product of their culture. Manipuri dance is characterised by gentleness, tenderness and devotion. The dress they wear during a dance is really gorgeous and beautiful. A very popular festival of the Manipuris is a type of Gopi dance celebrating the romantic liaison of Radha and Krishna. In the spring, Manipuris celebrate Yaoshang (a Meitei equivalent of Holi), when they drench each other with colour. Most religious rites and festivals of the Manipuris are based on the seasons of the year. They also celebrate the rice harvest through a singing contest. Manipuris put up colourful wedding pandals, and the bride and groom go round the pandal to be greeted with paddy and durva grass. Manipuris cannot marry within their own clans. A Manipuri bride comes to visit her parents for the first time on the fifth day after marriage, providing an occasion for a lavish feast. According to traditional custom, all members of the clan are invited to this ceremony and they come with presents of rice, fish, fowls, money. Manipuris have their own rituals regarding disposal of the dead body. They keep the dying person outside the house on a banana leaf, while Kirtans are chanted. Dead bodies are washed with the head pointed northward. They bury bodies of adolescents and cremate bodies of older persons. After disposing of the body, the pallbearers take a bath and dry their hands by holding them above a fire before entering their house.

=== Hajong ===
The Hajong people are an ethnic group from northern parts of Bangladesh. The Hajongs community lives mostly in the Mymensingh and Sylhet districts of Bangladesh and are predominantly rice farmers. In Bangladesh, Hajongs are also found in the northern Dhaka division, although there are unconfirmed reports of some Hajong living in Chittagong Division.

=== Keot (Kaibarta) ===
The Keot (Kaibarta) people of Bangladesh belong to the Austric stock and are an aboriginal tribe which has slowly been converted into a caste. They generally practice fishing and agriculture as their prime source of livelihood. This tribal ethnic community is also present in Assam and North Bengal etc. They have lost their mother tongue and use the standard language of Bangladesh for communication but they have still preserved their cultural, racial and traditional identity alive.

== See also ==
- Jumma (people)
- Ethnic groups in the Chittagong Hill Tracts
