= Biju festival =

New Year festival of Chakma people

Bizhu
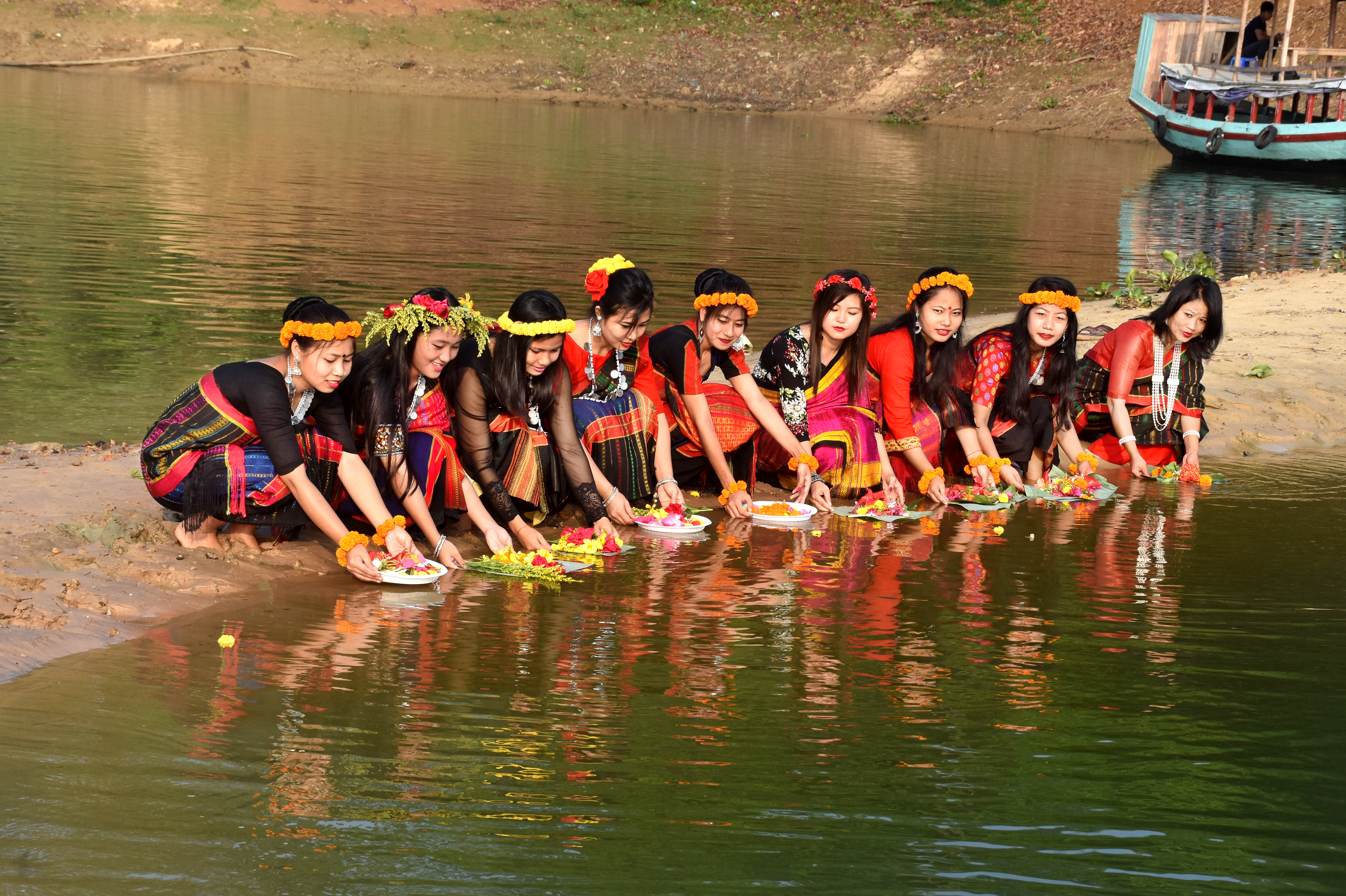
- Chakmas observing the Bizu festival at Rangamati
- Official name: Bizu
- Observed by: Chakma people
- Significance: Chakma New Year
- Date: 12–14 April
- Frequency: Annual
- Related to: South and Southeast Asian solar New Year

The Biju festival is celebrated by the Chakma people in Bangladesh and India, as the traditional New Year's Day which falls around 12–14 April.

== Bizhu ==
Bizhu is a three-day-long festival that commemorates the commencement of a new year for the Chakmas and is their most important festival. Bizhu marks the Chaitra-sankranti, which is the last day of the Bengali calendar, and the festivities span a period of three days starting on the day of the Chaitra-sankranti. It is thought that the festival lasted for a full fortnight in earlier times. Bizhu has close links to the practice of jhum cultivation among the Chakmas and is believed to have originated as a festival to propitiate the earth for a bounteous harvest following the first rains of the agricultural season. In recent years, the festival has lost some of its agrarian linkages and has become a social event for the Chakmas. The rituals associated with Bizhu too have been simplified over time.

The festivities begin on the first day, also known as the Phool Bizhu, when Chakma households are cleaned out and decked with flowers. In the evening special prayers are made to the Buddha and lamps lit at the Chakmas' houses and Buddhist temples. The next day, Mul Bizhu, is a time for socialising as people visit others in their village, participate in traditional games and cook special curries and sweets for the day. According to Chakma belief, a person dying on the day of Mul Bizhu goes to heaven. The Mul Bizhu ends with a performance of the Bizhu dance. The last day, Gojjepojje din is set aside for the performance of various religious and social activities.

== Attire ==
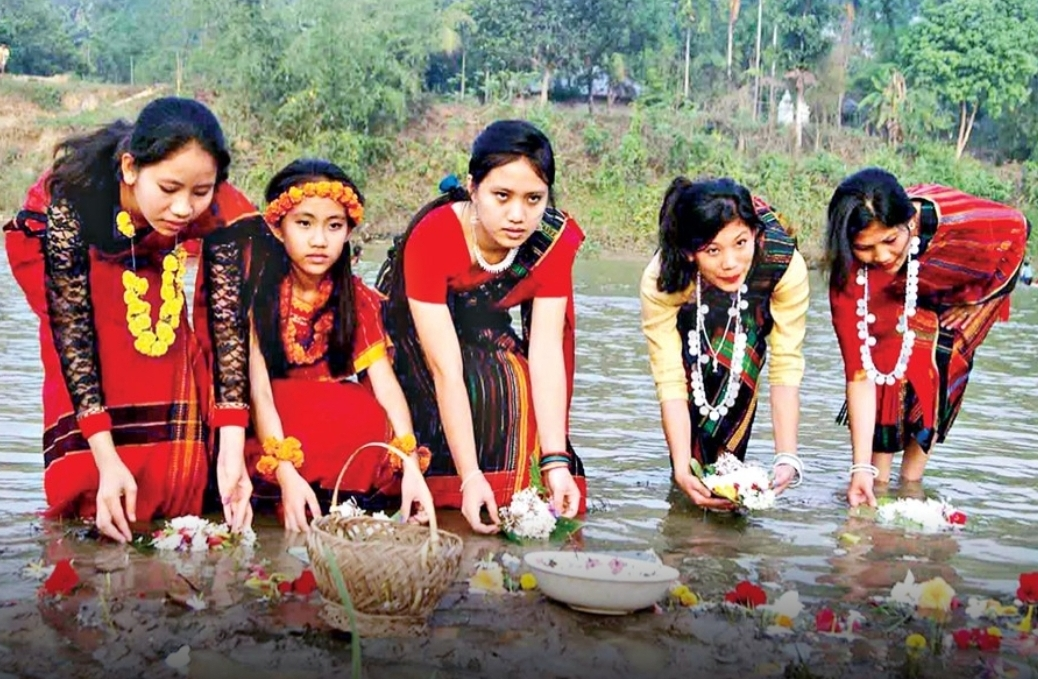
Chakma girls in Pinon Hadi during the Festival

The women wear pinon and hadi and deck themselves in silver ornaments while the men wear a headgear called khabang and a dhoti and jacket.

== Dance ==
Bizhu dance is a dance performed by the Chakma people on their new year.

The Bizhu dance is a group dance with participants aligning themselves in a square or circular pattern. The Chakmas dress up in their traditional attire when participating in it. It is thought to have originally been a devotional offering performed within the precincts of the Chakmas' temples. The dance is unlike other dance forms in that it is marked by abrupt pauses during its performance. In recent years it has enjoyed a surge in popularity owing to its appealing rhythm and easy tunes. Through the Bizhu dance, the Chakmas bid adieu to the departing year and usher in the new year.

=== Musical accompaniments ===
The dance draws some of its charm by virtue of the music that accompanies it. Flutes and drums accompanying the dance set its rhythm. The dhol, baajhi, khenggarang and dhuduk accompany the dance. Of these, the khenggarang and dhuduk are crafted from bamboo while the dhol is a percussion instrument and the baajhi a flute.
