= Chakma people =

Ethnic group from the Indian subcontinent

Chakma
𑄌𑄋𑄴𑄟𑄳𑄦
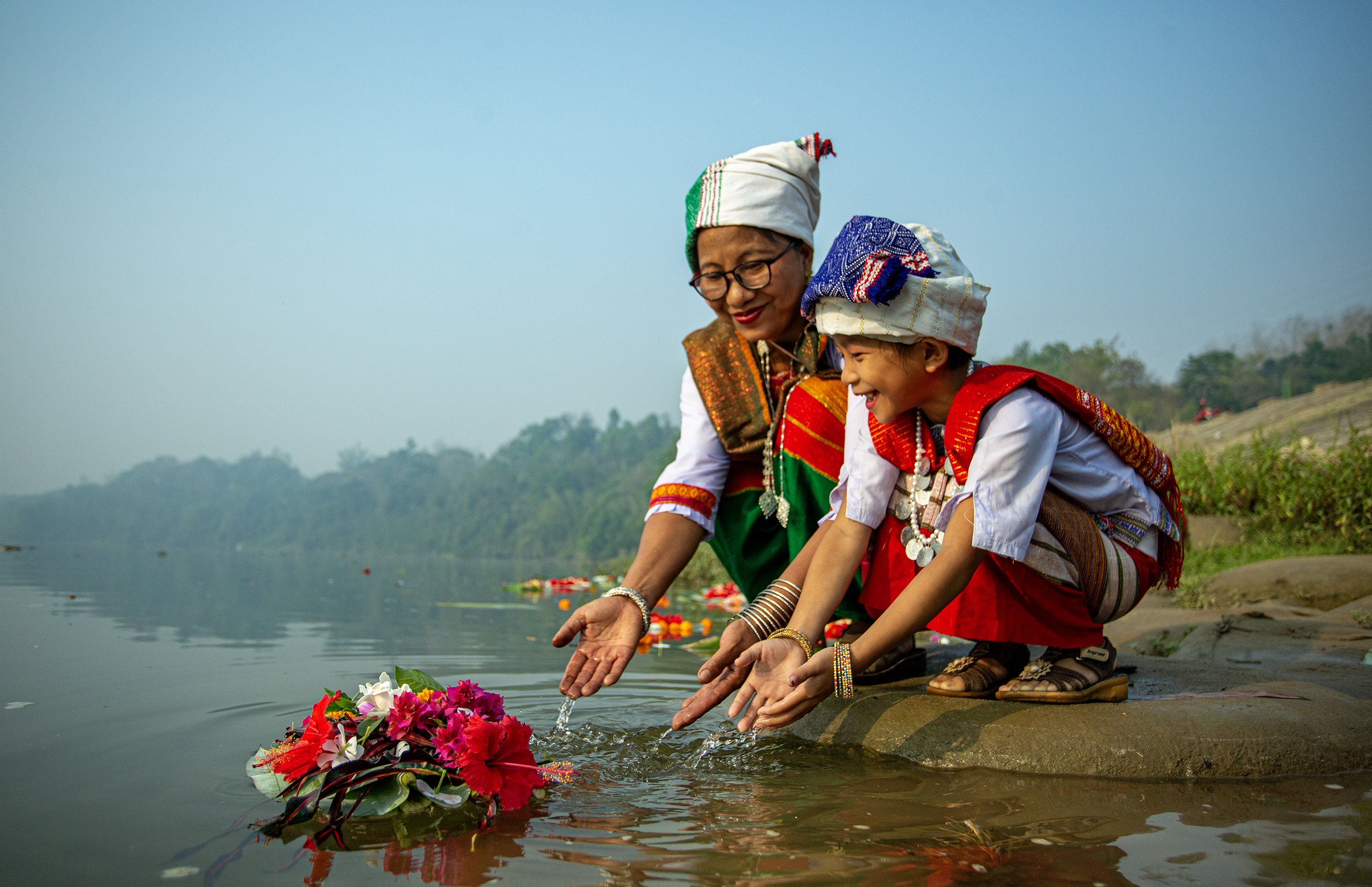
- A Chakma woman and a boy in traditional dress offering flowers for Bizu in Kaptai Lake

Total population
- c. 750,000 to 1,000,000 (2011–2022)

Regions with significant populations
- Bangladesh, India and Myanmar
- Bangladesh: 483,299 (2022)
- India: 228,281 (2011)
- Mizoram: 92,850
- Tripura: 84,269
- Arunachal Pradesh: 47,073
- Assam: 3,166
- West Bengal: 175
- Meghalaya: 159
- Nagaland: 156
- Myanmar: 43,100

Languages
- Chakma

Religion
- Predominantly: Theravada Buddhism; Minority: Christianity

Related ethnic groups
- Daingnet, Tanchangya, Marma and other Jumma people: Chakpa people (Note: Former Luish speaking inhabitants of Manipur); Kadu people; Chak people

- People: Changhma
- Language: Changhma Bhach (𑄌𑄋𑄴𑄟𑄳𑄦 𑄞𑄌𑄴)
- Country: Chadigang

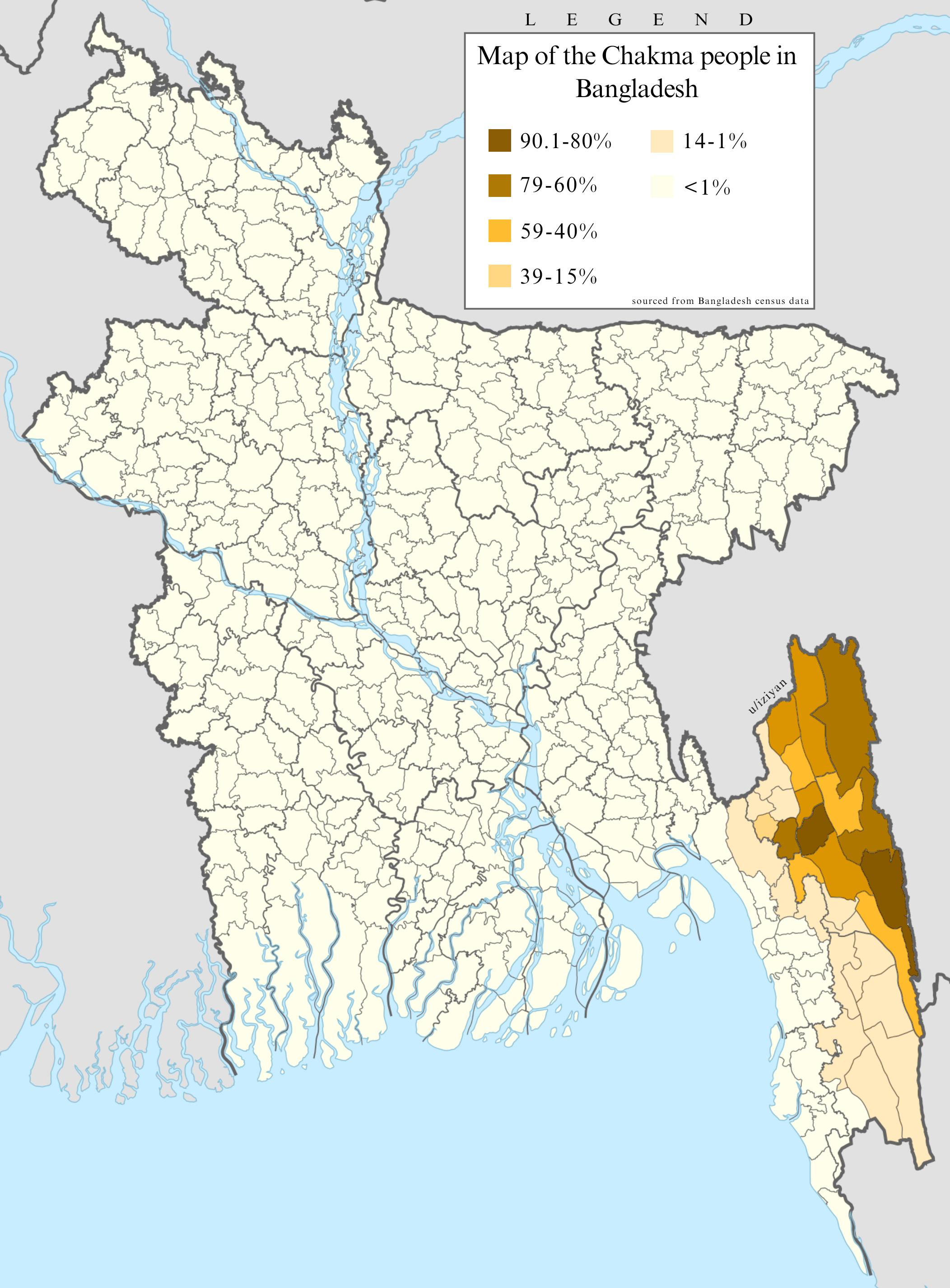
Map showing the percentage of Chakma population by Upazila

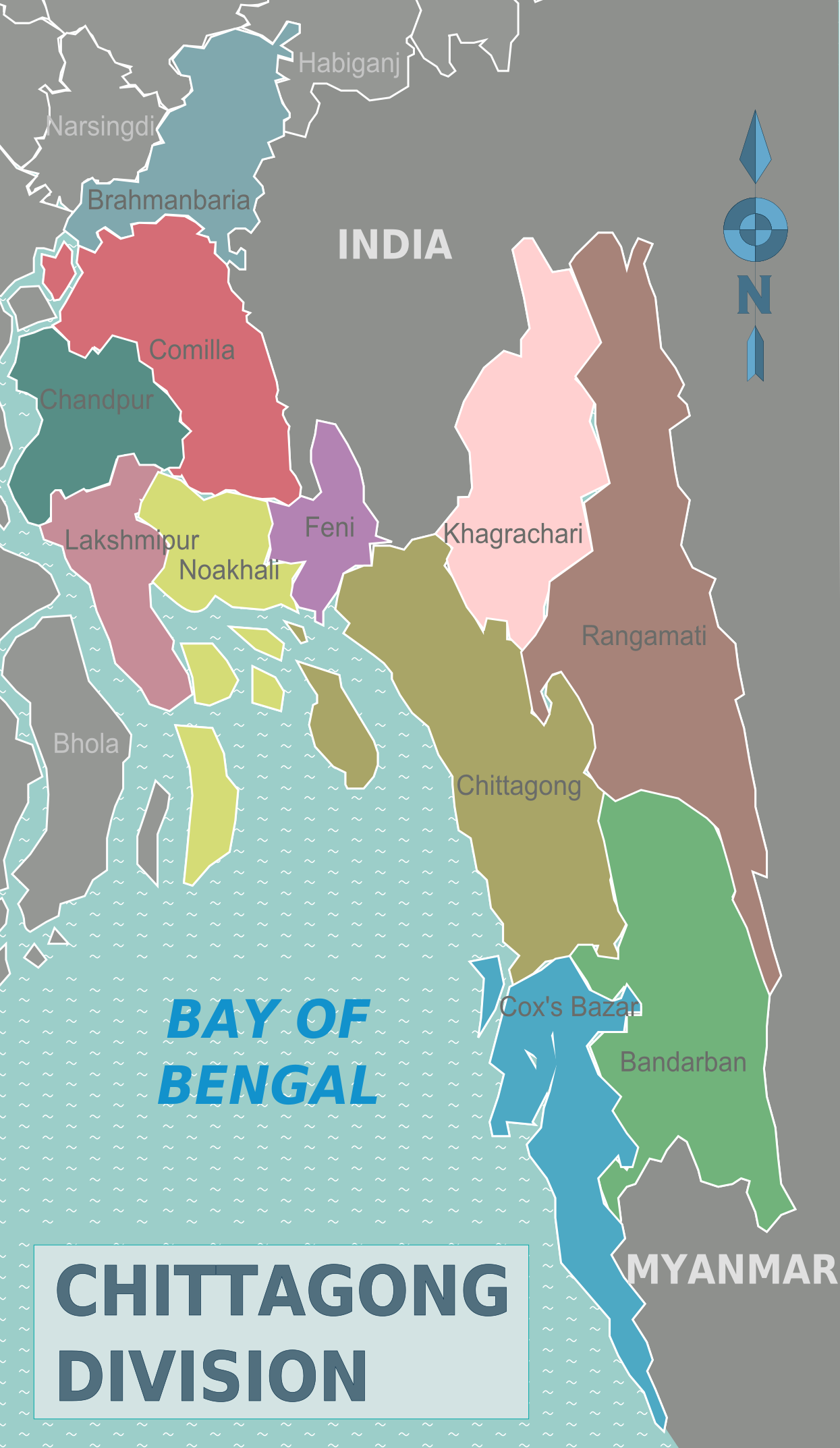
Colour-coded map of the districts of Chittagong Division in Bangladesh, including the Chittagong Hill Tracts (Khagrachhari, Rangamati, and Bandarban districts) on the easternmost border to India and Myanmar.

The Chakma, or Changhma people (Chakma: 𑄌𑄋𑄴𑄟𑄳𑄦, 𑄌𑄇𑄴𑄟), are an ethnic group and nation native to the Indian subcontinent and western Myanmar. They are the largest indigenous group as well as the second largest ethnic group of the Chittagong Hill Tracts region of southeastern Bangladesh. They also form the majority in Chakma Autonomous District Council of Mizoram. Significant Chakma populations are found in the northeast Indian states of Arunachal Pradesh, Tripura, Assam and Rakhine State of Myanmar.

The Chakma possess strong ethnic affinities to Tibeto-Burman-speaking groups in Northeast India. Due to a historical language shift aimed at consolidating intertribal power, the Chakma adopted the Indo-Aryan Chakma language, which is closely related to Pali and to the Chittagonian language spoken in adjacent regions. Most modern Chakma people practice Theravada Buddhism, due to 19th-century reforms and institutionalisation by Queen regnant Rani Kalindi. In Myanmar, Chakma people are known as Daingnet and are one of the 135 officially recognised ethnic groups in Myanmar. They are also referred as "Saks", "Sakmas" or "Tsakmas".

The Chakmas are divided into 31 clans or gozas. The community is headed by the Chakma Raja, whose status as a tribal head has been historically recognised by the government of British India and the government of Bangladesh.

== Etymology ==
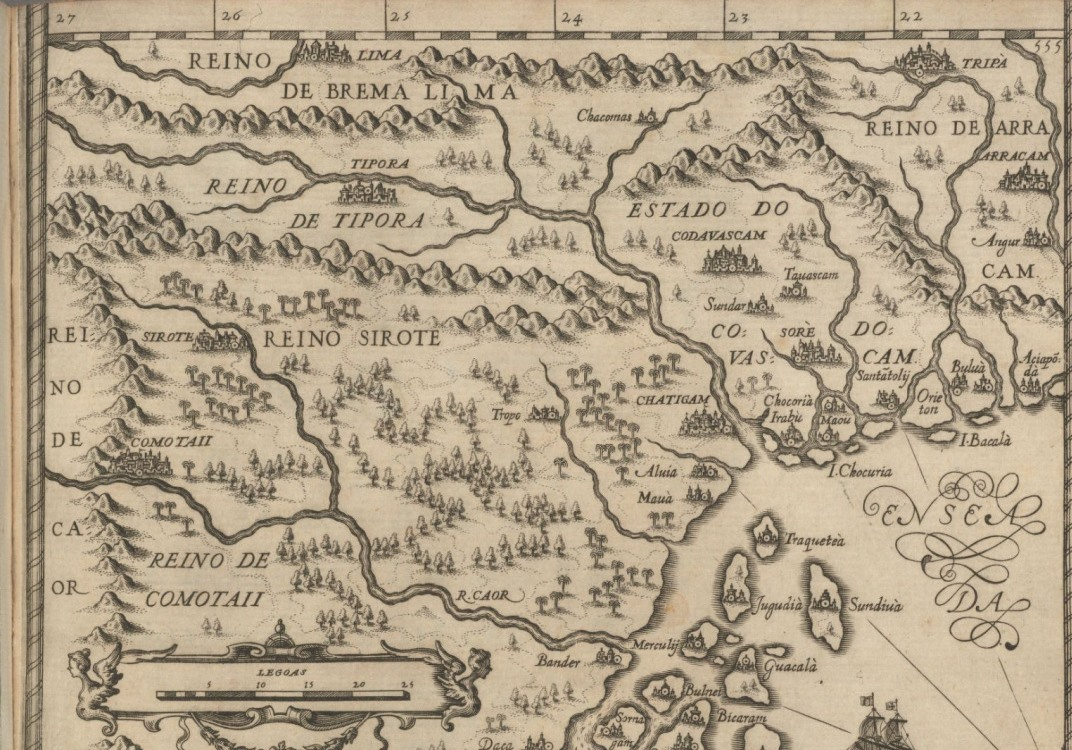
Portuguese map of Chittagong Hill Tracts. Chacomas on the Eastern bank of the river Karnaphuli and Arracan (present Rakhine State of Myanmar) can be seen on the extreme right

The ethnonyms Chakma likely derived from the autonym of the Luish speaking peoples like the Kadu who refer to themselves as Sak or Asak. According to Thomas Herbert Lewin，Chakma can also be read as Tsakma or Tsak. According to Pamela Gutman Chakma derives from the Sanskrit word śaktimāna, which means powerful and great. The name was given to the Chakmas by one of the Burmese kings during the Bagan Era. Burmese kings hired Chakmas as ministers, advisers, and translators of Buddhist Pali texts. As employees of the king, the Chakmas wielded power in the Burmese court that was disproportionate to their number. The Burmese people still refer to Chakmas as Sak (သက်) or Thet, which are shortened and corrupted forms of śaktimāna. The modern linguistic study suggests that the term "Chakma" originates from two constituent words: "Tsak" and "Ma". In this context, "Tsak" is believed to be derived from "Shak" which is associated with the Shakya clan, and "Ma" signifies "man" in Tibeto-Burmese languages. The Chakma script shows similarities to Brahmi script suggesting Chakmas may descend from the Shakya lineage.

== History ==
=== Sakya lineage claim ===
The association of the Chakmas with Buddhist origins lie in effort to connect the term Chakma to the Śākya clan of the Buddha. Chakma-Kormi in 1941 wrote the Rājnāmā (Chronicle of Chakma Kings) in the Bengali language. Chakma-Korni claimed the document was written in the 19th century by a pandit named Śaṅkarācārya. The document traced the Chakma Chiefs of the Chittagong Hill Tracts back to mythical times such as the Lunar Dynasty among the Indo-Aryan peoples. The earliest figures were attested to be semidivine figures of Indian mythology and rulers of the Gangetic plains. The document claims a Śākya prince of unknown renown called Abhiratha ruled Kapilavastu. His descendants left Kapilavastu and founded a kingdom in Kalpanagar. Sudhanya, a descendant is said to have become the contemporary of the Buddha and joined the Sangha. Following his son Langaldhana's death, the prime minister Shyamala became King and moved east into the Himalayas. His son Champakali was stated to have built a capital on the bank of the Irrawaddy River called Champaknagar.

=== Origins ===
The Chakmas descend from ancient Tibeto-Burman groups of Southwest China. These groups were categorically labelled as the Southwest barbarians (Chinese: 西南夷; pinyin: Xīnán yí) (transl. Southwest Barbarians) and Qiang (Chinese: 羌; pinyin: Qiāng). The Qiang splintered into many groups over time in the southwest. The most powerful group becoming the pinyin: Qiongdu which in Old Chinese is analgous to Kontu or Kondu. This suggests the Chakma who have commonality with the Kadu people both descend from the Qiongdu of Southwest China. Early British colonialists argued that the Qiongdu derived Kadu entered Burma through the passes north of Bhamo. The Chakma and Luish peoples are expected to have entered Northern Myanmar in the 4th century. Their power in northern Burma began to wane in the 9th century with the rise of Burmese peoples. Scholars such as Luce argue the Chakma-Luish peoples precede the Pyu people in entering Burma while others claim theory followed the Pyu. According to Kadu accounts, linguists state that the Chak-Luish peoples entered the Hukawng Valley near the upper Uru River in Kachin State. They diverged from here with two populations forming. The Thet groups went south via the Chindwin River into Manipur and Bangladesh while the Kadu went southeast to Katha and Myitkhina. The Kadu became the most powerful tribe of the Chindwin and that the Kadu contributed to the formation of the Bamar people. The Kadu in Burmese transcriptions were also pronounced as "Thet" when Sak was transcribed. The Kadu also formed one of the three great races of the Burma delta, namely the Burmese, Kadu and Pyu.

According to Fan Chuo's Man Shu (Chinese: 蛮书), a passage discusses a little Brahmin Kingdom (Chinese: 小婆罗门国) discuss that it maintains close relations with Big Ears Kingdom (Chinese: 大耳国). Luce argues that these big eared polity in Burma were the early Kadu who have a tradition of wearing heavy earrings and stretching their lobes.

=== Contemporary records in the medieval era ===
The proposed migration of the Sak-Kadu Qiongdu has been proposed to be around the beginning of the Common era. Excavations of the central Irrawaddy basin have shown evidence of a thriving Pyu culture. In the 8-9th centuries, the Kadu lived in upper central Myanmar with Tagaung Kingdom as their capital. Sak villages were also found further south such as Sak Munalwan (transl. village of the Saks) and Sak-cuiw (transl. Mountain of the Saks). The Glass Palace Chronicle also states that a Sak settlements is mentioned as the "mount of the Theks" in the Kingdom of Macchagiri. Local Sak history states a king name Cho-phru settled and ruled the hill in the Turang mountains (Tuiwindaung) near Pagan.

Most Chinese records of the Qiongdu/Kadu people are from the 13th century during Mongol rule. The Yuan History Chroncile records about the Jiandu (Chinese: 建都; pinyin: Jiàndū). During this period, the explorer Marco Polo records of the Caindu people in his book, Travels of Marco Polo. Scholars have argued the Caindu and the Jiandu to be the same group being referenced. Mongol records mention that a general was killed by the Jiandu in 1264. Jiandu is used loosely as a term for a neghbouring kingdom. However, Jiandu is also used as a proper name for an ethnic group with the label "barbarian" (Chinese: 蛮; pinyin: Mán). In 1267, a punitive expedition against the Jiandu was sanctioned according to volume 6 of the Yuan History. The city of Tagaung was described as the nest and hole of the rebels being used to resist the Mongol armies. Tagaung was captured and the twelve towns of Jiandu, Jingchi (Gold Teeth and others submitted. Jiandu lands were stated to be gold abundant and a foundry was established to extract the captured people to regine the gold for the government. Other records mention Jiandu outside of Burma in the territory of Yuexi, which the Mongols named Jianchang (now Xichang in Liangshan Yi Autonomous Prefecture). Marco Polo's records state that the Caindu reside in the upper part of the River Brius which is equated to the Yangzi River in the area between Sichuan, Yunna and Tibet. Hence the Caindu and Jiandu were originally Southwestern Chinese inhabitants. The other branch of the Jiandu were the Burmese ruled Jiandu of Tagaung.

The absence of the Jiandu in China suggest that the Burmese branch is the remaining branch left. According to Gordon Luce, Kadu used in Burman inscriptions are just a transcription of the middle Chinese pronunciation of Jiandu (Kantu). Burmese records claim the kingdom of the Kantu was known as Santhway Pran with their capital at Tagaung. It is likely the Jiandu in South Sichuan became absorbed into the various tribes and Han populations over time and diluted their identity and traditions.

Later on, the expansion of the Bamar people and the Shans led to political centralization and agricultural growth in the Irrawaddy and Chindwin valleys. This also meant many groups were forced to migrate west and south. According to the Mahārāzāweng (Royal Chronicle of the Kings of Burma) the Saks were located West of the Chindwin River.

=== Arakan era ===
According to the Arakanese Chronicles, King Tsulatheng Tsandya (Śūraśiṃhacandra) of Waithali Kingdom died as the last ruler of the Candra dynasty. This death prompted two Mru chiefs to briefly rule Waithali for a period and allowed the Saks to consolidate their power under Nga-Maung-Kadon in the northern Arakan region of Sambowet in Pyinsa and Lemro. Legends of Nga-Maung-Kadon claim that he was the posthumous son of Tsulatheng Tsandya who raiswed among the Sak tribe (which they called Thek) in the hills of the upper course of the Mayu River. Theories have been proposed that the Buddhist Saks allied themselves with the declining Candra dynasty and that the 10th century oversaw Sak domination in the Arakan region briefly with their seat of power at Sambowet. The king Nga-Maung-Kadon was killed in 1018AD when resisting a Burmese invasion. His head was severed and displayed as a trophy, which was mentioned in the Glass Palace Chronicles as the name "Thekminkaton" (King of the Saks), where his head was decapitated and presented to the Burmese King. Following the Burmese takeover of Arakan, the Saks left the Lemro region. Burmese Chronicles allege following this that some Kanran and Sak groups migrated into Prome, which is recorded in Burmese inscriptions depicting the Saks in the vicinity of the Pagan Kingdom. Luce argues that the Old Burmese title of Mahā-sak-thit meant the "Terror of the Sak" which explains the constant tension between the two groups. The Saks of Macchhagiri eventually became an issue, leading to war with the Burmese. The Glass Palace Chronicle records the events of this encounter.

Macchagiri is said to have rebelled when Yazathingyan of Pagan went into exile. When he was recalled, an army of two hundred elephants, two thousand horses and twenty thousand soldiers were assembled against Macchagiri. However, the army was poorly disciplined and fled in haste. A second army under four generals (Yazathingyan, Tharevadanna, Sitturbinko and Sitturinkathu) were deployed. Four thousand elephants, forty thousand horses and four hundred thousand men were sent to Macchagiri. The outlying settlements and villages were razed to the ground. The Macchagiri king waited on the mount of the Theks and surrendered. Chakma accounts also claim this story. Their narrative focuses on the period during the Arakan reign of Mangthi (Mengdi), son of Mang Bhilu (Meng-Bhilu). Yengcho ruled the Saks and held court at Macchagiri as a ruler. Four generals were dispatched to the kingdom with a beautiful maiden. A messenger was sent to Yengcho that King Mangthi offered his sister Brahmi's hand in marriage and agreed on 12 February 1333. A general of Arakan was arranged and led ten thousand mecernaries as an escort for Brahmi to Macchagiri. Yengcho who became captivated with her beauty lost sight of managing his state affairs and army. Hence the four generals took advantage and surrounded the capital. While the Saks rested, the army took Yengcho, his three queens, two sons (Chophru and Chothung) and two daughters captive. Chochung however escaped and took refuge with the Burmese king. Yengcho was made a tributary ruler of Kyathkya and his sons were made governors of Ming and Kang provinces. The Saks were thus in disarray as a result and were resettled on the Aeng and Ro rivers. Chakma traditions claim that Prince Chothung later settled in the Chittagong Hill Tracts where some Sas followed him and settled in Yangcha and Gengowa in the Lama subdvision. However some Saks remained in Arakan. Chakma groups maintain folklore stories that during migration, one camp took too long to cook their fish and thus were left behind and explained the reason for disaporic populations. This folklore is used among the Saks of Manipur and the Daingnaks of Sittwe.

The Rakhine people referred to the Chakmas as Saks, Theks, or Thaikhs. In 1546 CE, while the Arakanese king Min Bin was fighting a battle with the Burmese, the Sak king attacked Northern Arakan Roma and occupied the Arakanese-controlled Chacomas of the Northern Arakan Mountains.

Chak and Marma traditions claim that the Sak migration to Chittagong occurred during the late 14th or early 15th century. An Arakan Chronicle Dhagnawadi Areḥdopũ mentions that a group of Saks entered Chittagong at the beginning of the 15th century. Mangrekyaz the son of Maungswe and Sak king of Maunzamru were at war with the king of Arakan but were defeated and forced to migrate to Chittagong where the Muslim governor permitted them to settle in twelve villages. According to Chakma history, in the early 15th century, a group of Saks joined forces with the Baruas (Bengali Buddhists) from Chittagong and attempted to gian control of the upper Koladyne during the period of unrest in Arakan. However, they were defeated by the Arakanese. The Daingnets joined their alliance and entered the war as well. The Daingnet migrated to the Matamuri valley while the Min Sak Chakma group were left at Sa-cuḥ-tong. The Tanchangya people record in oral tradition various memories of the Arakan War. Their oral history also record how the first of thir people settled in Chittagong were known as Sāppye. In 1418, many Arakan Saks travelled through the forrested frontier and arrived at Alikadam. The Governor of Chittagong, Jamal-ud-din permitted them to establish homes in twelve villages known as Bāra Tāluk (transl. the twelve tāluks) which were renamed from the twelve gosās settled there already.

The Tanchangya gained their name as they settled in the Tain Chari in the hill tracts. The Daingnets settled in the mountains south of the Marma areas, and the Mrus resided in the middle of the hill tracts of the Karnaphuli region. The Buddhist Saks traditionally dominated the southern part of the hill tracts and had influence over the native mountain people, the Daingnet and the Tanchangya. The Tannchangya claim that migrations of people further west led to the making of the modern Chakma people. The Chakma and Tanchangya were once one people, and the Chakma identity consolidated when Dhabana became king. The Tanchangya refer to the Chakma as Ānokyā (transl. those who live west).

Diego de Astor created a map of Bengal, which was published as Descripção do Reino de Bengalla in the book Quarta decada da Asia (Fourth decade of Asia) by João de Barros in 1615. The map shows an area named Chacomas on the eastern bank of the Karnaphuli River in what is now Chittagong Bangladesh, suggesting that the Chakmas inhabited this area during the time.

The Chakma began to develop their political system in Chittagong with the leadership of four chiefs belonging to four different Kingship groups: Dhurjya (Bogā gojhā), Kurjya (Tainnyā gojhā), Pirabhanga (Dhāmei gojā) and Dhabana (Mulimā gojhā). The Baruā or Barbwa gojhā was a fifth kinship group that had a line of rājās to the Matamuri Saks; however was excluded from sharing political power. The last ruler in the Barua lineage was Sattwa also known as the Pagla Raja. The king was killed in a popular revolt against his madness. His widow Kattwa Rani fled to Fatikchari with her sons and daughter and formed relations with the Tipperah King. The Tripura King wedded Kattwa's daughter Amangali and produced Pirabhanga of the dhāmei gojhā. Kattwa Rani returned to the hill tracts later with mercenaries and became the Chamka chieftainess. After her death, her two sons became co-rulers but were killed by aristocrats. During a period of uncertainty, as Chakma nobles conspired against each other, Dhabana became the Chakma chief with the assistance of the Marmas. The Rājnāmā states that Dhabana fostered solidarity among the ethnic groups of Chakma, Tippera, Kuki, Tanchangya, Riang, Murung, Mags and Khyangs and bestowed titles on chiefs of the tribes.

In 1666, the Mughal Governor of Bengal, Shaista Khan, defeated the Arakanese, conquered Chittagong, and renamed it Islamabad. Mughal rule, however, was confined to the plain areas of Chittagong early on, leaving the Chakmas largely unaffected. The Mughals eventually demanded tribute from the Chakmas after a trade dispute developed between the two groups.

In 1713, the conflict was resolved, and a stable relationship developed between the Chakmas and the Mughals; the latter never demanded complete subjugation of the former. The Mughals also rewarded the Chakma king Shukdev Roy; he established a new capital in his name in an area still known as Shukbilash. Ruins of the royal palace and other historic buildings still exist. Subsequently, the capital was shifted to Rajanagar, Ranirhat, Rangunia Upazila, Chittagong District.

The Mughals signed a treaty with Jallal Khan, Raja of the Chakma, in 1715. While the Mughals controlled significant amounts of yam and cotton crops in the Chittagong Hill Tracts (CHT), the Chakma's independence from the Mughals was recognised.

=== The East India Company ===
Three years after the Battle of Plassey, Mir Qasim, the new Nawab of Murshidabad, rewarded the East India Company with Chittagong, Burdwan and Midnapur. On 5 January 1761, company representative Harry Verelst took charge of Chittagong from Subedar Mohammad Reza Khan, but the Chakma king Sher Doulat Khan, who was practically independent though nominally paid tribute to the Mughals, did not accept the hegemony of the company and its demand for increased taxes.

Encroachments on the Chittagong Hill Tracts by the British led to a protracted war between the East India Company and the Chakmas from 1777 to 1787. The East India Company launched four offensives against the Chakmas in 1770, 1780, 1782 and 1785. In 1785, the Company started peace negotiations with the Chakma king Jan Baksh Khan, son of Sher Doulat Khan. In 1787 a peace treaty was signed in Calcutta. Raja Jan Baksh Khan pledged loyalty to the British in exchange for autonomy in administering Chakma territory.

The main provisions of the treaty between Governor-General Lord Cornwallis and the Chakma king were as follows:

- The East India Company recognised Jan Baksh Khan as the Raja of the Chakmas
- It was agreed that revenue collection was the responsibility of the Raja
- The British government would preserve tribal autonomy and migration from the plains would be restricted
- Jan Baksh Khan was bound by the treaty to maintain peace in his territory
- British troops would remain in the Chakma territory, not to terrify the Chakmas but to protect the land from hostile tribes

In 1829, Halhed, then Commissioner of Chittagong, reaffirmed that:

The hill tribes were not British subjects but merely tributaries and we recognized no right on our part to interfere with their internal arrangements. The near neighborhood of a powerful and stable government naturally brought the chiefs by degree under control and every leading chief paid to the Chittagong collector a certain tribute or yearly gifts. These sums were at first fluctuating in amount but gradually were brought to a specific and fixed limit, eventually taking the shape not of tribute but of revenue to the state.

Jan Baksh Khan shifted his capital to a new place near present-day Rangunia, naming it Rajanagar. After Jan Baksh's death in 1800, his son Tabbar Khan became king but died shortly after. In 1802, Tabbar Khan's younger brother Jabbar Khan became king and ruled for ten years. After his death, his son Dharam Baksh Khan became king in 1812 and ruled until his death in 1832. Without any male heir, the government appointed Suklal Dewan as manager. Rani Kalindi, the widow of Dharam Baksh Khan, applied to the government to allow her to run state affairs. The government accepted her application and in 1844 issued an order to that effect. In 1846, the annual revenue payable to the company was reset to 11,803.00Rs.

After the great Sepoy Mutiny in 1857, the British government assumed direct control of the administration of India, including the Chittagong Hill Tracts, which were not yet formally separated from Chittagong, from the East India Company. The territorial jurisdiction of the Chakma Raja, however, was fixed by a proclamation dated 6th Shraavana 1170M.S (1763 CE) by the company as "All the hills from the Feni River to the Sangoo and from Nizampur Road in Chittagong to the hills of Kooki Raja".

After Rani Kalindi's death in 1873, her grandson Harish Chandra became the Chakma Raja and was vested with the title Roy Bahadur.

=== British colonial rule ===
After the war with the British, the Chakmas became very weak militarily. The Lushai used to make frequent raids on British subjects because their hunting ground was converted to tea gardens by the British in Cachar, Noakhali, Comilla, and other neighbouring tracts under Rani Kalindi. They raided the Chittagong Hill Tracts and the neighbouring tracts in 1847, 1848, 1859, and 1860. As a consequence, with a view to paying attention to the areas experiencing repeated raids and to protecting the people from the aggression of the independent tribes living further east but primarily to occupy the Chakma land, the Lieutenant Governor of Bengal recommended the removal of the hill tracts from the regulation district and the appointment of a superintendent over the tribes. Both of these recommendations were adopted by Act XXII in 1860, which came into effect on 18 August of that year. The Hill Tracts were separated from Chittagong district, a superintendent was appointed for the Chittagong Hill Tracts, and its headquarters were established at Chandraghona. The hills in his charge were henceforth known as the Hill Tracts of the Chittagong. For the next few years, attention focused on preserving peace on the frontier. In 1869, the headquarters were shifted to Rangamati. The official designation of the post of superintendent was changed to Deputy Commissioner and full control of matters about revenue and justice throughout the Hill Tracts was vested in his office.

The frontier situation put pressure on the Chakma chief to shift his capital, and in 1874, he did so, from Rajanagar to Rangamati. At that time, cotton was grown in the Chittagong Hill Tracts and was important to the British for their mills, so effective control of the Chittagong Hill Tracts was also important for them.

In 1881, the government divided the Chittagong Hill Tracts into Chakma Circle, Bohmong Circle, and Mong Circle. Each circle was headed by a chief. Chakma circle was headed by a Chakma, Bohmong circle by a Bohmong and the Burmese circle by a Mong. The Chakma circle was centrally located and inhabited mainly by the Chakmas, the Bohmong circle was under the rule of a Bohmong chief of Arakanese extraction, and the Mong circle was also inhabited by Arakanese speaking clans with some Tripura immigrants and headed by another ruler of Arakanese extraction. The division occurred because the British government was not in favour of the power of the Chakma chief, who controlled the hill tribes. Further, the government was increasingly concerned about the political and administrative affairs of the tracts. Hence, they wished to lay the foundation of administration in a restricted manner with the following objectives:

- To supervise the rule of the Chakma chief and curtail some of his powers
- To protect British subjects from the Kuki (the name given to the Lushai by the British)
- To preserve peace in the frontier areas so cotton could be grown and made available for British mills

After the creation of a separate district and the three circles, the Kuki (Lushai) threat to the Chittagong Hill Tracts and other adjoining areas did not stop. The Shendus made occasional raids in the Hill Tracts between 1865 and 1888 and killed many people, including Lt. Steward and his survey party. In 1872, 1,890 military offensives were launched simultaneously into Lushai Hills (Mizoram) from Chittagong district and Burma in collaboration with the governments of Bengal, Assam and Burma, and the whole of the CHT was brought under British control.

Autonomous police forces were created by the Hill Tract tribes in 1881. Tribals complained to Britain after the Hill Tracts experienced attempts at penetration by lowlander Bengali Muslims.

On 1 April 1900, the South and the North Lushai Hills (then a part of the Chittagong Hill Tracts) were merged to form the district of Assam Province with headquarters at Aizawl. The Lushai hills were now the Mizoram state of India.

Later, the British through the Deputy Commissioner took over absolute control of the Chittagong Hill Tracts (including the Chakma circle) after the implementation of the Chittagong Hill Tracts manual. The Chittagong Hill Tracts (Lushai Hills) were again designated an "Excluded Area" under the Government of India Act 1935.

Local tribes demanded an independent state for the Chittagong Hill Tract because Bengalis and the tribals did not share a religion, language, or ethnicity, and they asked for their own independent area in the 1930s when the Indian national movement was launched. During World War II, to retain Chakma loyalty in the face of Japanese advances, local British officials guaranteed the tribals that the Chittagong Hill Tracts would be split of separately in the event of Indian independence.

=== After independence ===
In British India, there was a measure of security and protection afforded to the non-Muslim and non-Bengali Chittagong Hill Tract Chakmas and other tribal people. Bengal and Assam did not govern the CHT during this period. Rather the CHT was a distinct administrative unit that enjoyed a large degree of self-rule.

Despite the CHT being 97.2–98.5% non-Muslim, it was given to Pakistan by the Boundary Commission Chairman Sir Cyril Radcliffe in 1947 upon independence. Native Chakmas made up most of the officials except for some British during British India rule. Pakistan received the CHT from Radcliffe after the issue of Punjab districts and the CHT revised boundaries were pushed onto him by Lord Mountbatten on 17 August 1947. The decision by Radcliffe to draw this boundary paved the way for future war, violence, and conflict.

Under Pakistan in 1955, the special safeguards were undone and the Rule of Regulation was passed. The three rulers of the Chittagong Hill Tract and the Deputy Commissioner could not act but in accordance with the direction of the Central Government in Karachi. The Chittagong Hill Tract Police Force was disbanded and the offices belonging to the tribal section were transferred to different places in the plains areas and Muslim Bengali officers overtook such posts. The 1956 Pakistani Constitution, which designated the CHT as an "excluded area," kept things as they were. It was the fact that the CHT was governed under a different set of rules since 1900 in order to prevent mainlanders from acquiring ownership of the tribal land. The CHT underwent a significant change when the Pakistani armed forces overthrew the government in 1958 and renamed the protected area "Tribal Area." Finally, the 1962 Constitution was amended in 1963 to repeal the earlier designation, making the CHT accessible to all non-tribals. The Tract was thus placed under direct administration of central Pakistan and Muslim administrators engaged in taxes and implementing laws with the rest of the country. Following the dissolution of special status for tribal areas, the Chittagong Hill Tract Welfare Associationw as formed in 1966. A team of experts, such as geologists, soil scientists, biologists, economists, and engineers, was sent to examine how to best use the Chittagong Hill Tract Welfare Association. Following analysis, they proposed the recommendation that the whole of the hilly regions should be declared reserved areas and the tribal population had to leave their homes and jhums for the sake of national development. This move led to 100,000 individuals entering India as refugees. As a result, Chakmas' jhum cultivation was hampered, and numerous unauthorised settlers invaded this territory. The Bangladeshi Constitution does not refer to any group (inclusive of Bengalis) as indigenous.

As in India's Tripura State, the Chakmas lived in Bangladesh before it gained its independence. Recent migrations of ethnic Bengalis into traditionally Chakma regions of Bangladesh have raised tensions in the Chittagong Hill Tracts. Successive governments have dealt forcefully with Chakma uprisings and finally ended the conflict with the 1997 peace treaty. This force and the construction of Kaptai Dam by the then-Pakistan government in Chakma areas which submerged cultivable lands and displaced thousands resulted in the migration during 1964–1969 of a large population of Chakmas into Diyun, Arunachal Pradesh.

Many Buddhist Chakmas migrated from East Pakistan (now Bangladesh) to India. Projects for infrastructure development negatively impacted CHT tribals starting in the 1950s. These included the Kaptai Dam hydro-electric project, built-in 1959–1963 by the Pakistan government, with the assistance of the United States Agency for International Development, to provide electricity for much of East Pakistan. The project flooded forty per cent of the farmland in the Chittagong Hill Tracts and displaced nearly 100,000 Chakmas. About sixty per cent were resettled, and forty per cent fled to India. Chakmas made up 90% of the 10,000 people whose 54,000 acres of farmland were flooded in 1962 by the Karnafuli power plant and Kaptai Dam. Inept relocation and insufficient compensation were offered to the Chakmas. India used NEFA as a resettlement area for Chakma refugees.

The Chittagong Hill Tracts Chakma population was estimated at 250,000 in 1964. The CHT was described as being hilly, forested, a verdant green landscape filled with fountains of water. A deputy commissioner administered the Chittagong Hill Tracts Division under Pakistani rule.

=== Bangladesh Rule ===
Under the Bangladesh rule, since independence, the Bangladeshi freedom fighters dispossessed the tribals of their land in Ramgarh (Khagrachari sub-division) and Nakhuangchari (Bandarban sub-division) and sent in more than 50,000 Muslim Bengali settlers. These settlers ransacked houses, crops, robbed and looted property, raped women and killed resisting tribals. Buddhist temples in the region were burnt, and Buddhist priests were tortured. Following the Bangladeshi withdrawal, the Bangladeshi Army plundered and ransacked Panchari before leaving on 5 December 1971. It resulted in the torture of 16 persons and the death of two. Other atrocities include the killing of 18 individuals who came out to greet the liberation army. Many tribals were accused of being Pakistani supporters and were executed extrajudicially. In Kukichera alone, 176 houses were burnt down. Following this, the Bangladesh Rifles killed five Tuikuk men at Bangalkothi on 16 December 1971 with no justification. This was continued with the killing of 9 people and the rape of women at Tarabarmia on 21 December. On 22 December, they extorted money from the people of Panchari. Between 24 and 29 December, the Bangladesh Rifles continued extorting from the Mag of Ramgarh living within the Sonai Police Station.

Between late December 1971 and early January 1972, the Awami League arrested teachers and educated Chakmas on false accusations and suspicion. Many educated Chakmas were forced to take shelter in the jungle. Mawng Prue Sain, ruler of the Mawng sent the message to the central government to Mujibur Rahman and his cabinet to cease indiscriminate reckless treatment of the tribals being alleged as Pakistani collaborators and to release detained tribals. On January 9, the ruler of Bohmong and the Mag held a public meeting in Bandarban which was interrupted by Muslim students. The students accused the tribes of moving against the new state of Bangladesh and threatened them to convert to Islam to save their life or to go to Burma. Declining conversion, 4000 Mag families of thirty thousand individuals fled into Burma.

Manabendra Narayan Larma requested autonomy in 1970. Tripura state had to deal with the issue of Chakma families. Agriculture, employment, and education are dominated by Chakmas compared to Arunachal natives because they are more skilled and have a higher literacy rate. The hill tribes' conflict with Bangladesh caused the exodus of 50,000 Chakmas to India from the Chittagong Hill Tracts. A 1992 deal between India and Bangladesh arranged that Bangladesh would take them back. A March 1997 agreement between Chakma leaders and Bangladesh provided for the repatriation to Bangladesh of Chakma refugees in Tripura. Both East Pakistan's partition and Bangladesh's independence caused an influx into India of Chakma refugees. In the 1960s, hundreds of Muslim families from other parts of East Pakistan were resettled in the Matamuhuri Valley region of Alikadam, Feni Valley regions of Belchari and Tulanchari, and the regions of Lama, Bandarban, and Ramgarh.

Tridev Roy continued to collaborate with Pakistani forces and declined to join the freedom movement of Bangladesh. Pakistani president Yahya Khan assigned a south-east Asian diplomatic post to Tridiv Roy during the war as a reward for his collaboration. Roy chose the Pakistani side, fearing that an independent Bangladesh would likely have democratic rule and he might lose his feudal interests. Pakistan retained his support and allegiance, Roy agreed on 25 March, and in exchange British artillery would refrain from shelling the CHT capital, Rangamati. Roy believed Bangladesh would not award autonomy to CHT and the Chakmas and earned the enmity of the Awami League by rejecting Sheikh Mujibur Rahman's offer to stand as the Awami League candidate. Autonomy was refused to the CHT tribals. CHT hills people were enrolled as Mujahids and Razakars by the Pakistan army during the Bangladesh Liberation War of 1971.

The Bangladesh government provided financial support for thousands of Bengalis to settle in the tracts. By 1981, a third of the population of the tracts were Bengali migrants. Parbatya Chattagram Jana Samhati Samiti (PCJSS; Chittagong Hill Tracts Peoples Solidarity Association), which was founded by Chakmas, demanded a halt to Bengali settlement, settlers returning lands to CHT natives, and autonomy. On 7 January 1973, Shanti Bahini (Peace Force) was founded as the military army of PCJSS. In an effort to win independence for the Chittagong Hill Tracts, the Shanti Bahini launched guerrilla attacks against the government. Jumma guerrillas made up of Shanti Bahini forces. The party heads of PCJSS are mostly Chakma because of their 59% literacy rate, which is more than other CHT tribes, so they control the PCJSS.

During the war, most of the Pahadis remained passive, although the Mukti Bahini enrolled some. In 1971, the Pakistan army enrolled CHT hill men. After the war, Tridev Roy maintained his allegiance to Pakistan, which he supported in the war. In 1970, he served as independent in the Parliament of Pakistan while serving as Raja of the Chakma. The Awami League candidate Sheikh Mujibur Rahman lost the election to Roy. Roy was in Southeast Asia when Bangladesh came under Indian army control in December 1971. Bhutto assigned the position of Minorities Affairs Minister to Roy and he helped lobby the United Nations (UN) for Pakistan after the war. The post of ambassador and tourism was also awarded to Roy. Roy represented Pakistan when it protested at the UN over Bangladesh. Pakistan retained the allegiance of only Nurul Amin and Tridiv Roy among their East Pakistan MPs. Roy refused to join Bangladesh because the hill tracts were not granted autonomy and stayed on Pakistan's side despite Mujib trying to urge Tridiv to quit Pakistan.

==== Refuge in India ====
Meghalaya and Tripura were destinations of Buddhist Chakma refugees fleeing from the war started by plains-dwelling Muslim Bangladeshis settling the CHT, as well as the government of Bangladesh implementing a military police force to expel Chittagong Hill Tracts natives. "The Muslim World" complained about alleged immigration from Bangladesh to Arakan by Buddhists of Magh and Chakma background.

In 1974, the Garo people were stripped of their property by the XLVI Vested and Non-President Property Act by Bangladesh and affected by the 1964 Enemy Property Ordinance. Lands in CHT were taken by Bengali colonists; the hill peoples of the CHT were not afforded any cultural or ethnic recognition, and sympathy from successive Bangladesh governments, despite culture and ethnicity being used as an argument against Pakistan by Bengalis during the war. A 1997 peace agreement ended the over the twenty-year-long war on autonomy between Bangladesh and the Chittagong Hill Tracts Jumma inhabitants. The Chittagong Hill Tracts showed that only Bengalis were to be beneficiaries of Bengali nationalism and its "liberalism", which was aimed against the hegemony of Pakistan. Even the "pro-minority" and participant of the CHT peace agreement, the Awami League, refused to grant the status of Adibashi, declaring that according to the constitution, Bengali is the nationality and Bangladeshi is citizenship and refused to acknowledge that Bangladesh had indigenous people. Bengali nationalism is part of the BNP's ideology. Jumma nationalism was spawned from Bengali nationalism due to the hegemony exerted by the Bengalis.

The rights of CHT natives were ignored when the Rangmati Kaptai Dam was built. Because the CHT Jummas were apathetic towards Bangladeshi independence, the Bengali majority regarded them as disloyal. No autonomy was awarded to the Chittagong Hill Tracts in the Bangladesh Constitution of 1972. The Chakma conflict is both a religious and ethnic problem in Bangladesh. The Chittagong Hill Tracts saw tribal Chakma leave the area due to religious and ethnic strife caused by Bangladesh's Islamisation policy. The Chittagong Hill Tracts was colonised by Northern Burmese and Bangladeshi Muslims. The label "genocidal" has been used to describe actions by the Bangladeshi government upon the non-Islamic Chittagong Hill Tracts Jumma natives.

In 1972, the prime ministers of India and Bangladesh made a pact in which India agreed to grant citizenship, under §5(1)(a) of the Citizenship Act, 1955, to Chakma refugees who had entered India prior to 1971. Despite this, the state of Arunachal Pradesh has taken no action on applications by Chakmas for citizenship, effectively blocking them. The persecution of the ethnic tribes of the Chittagong Hill Tracts, of which the Chakma are the predominant ethnicity, has been greatly reduced after the 1997 Chittagong Hill Tracts Peace Accord.

==== Indian representation ====
The Chakmas now have representation in the Mizoram Legislative Assembly, Tripura Legislative Assembly and Tripura Tribal Areas Autonomous District Council. The only seat of political power and identity is the Chakma Autonomous District Council in India, the legitimacy of which is questioned by the Mizo people. There are another 80,000 Chakmas in Rakhine state, Myanmar, who are known as Daingnet people.

In 2015, the Supreme Court of India directed the government of India and the state government of Arunachal Pradesh to finalise the conferment of citizenship on eligible Chakmas.

== Population ==
=== Bangladesh ===
According to 2022 census, Chakmas are the largest ethnic group in Rangamati Hill District (42.67%) and second largest in Khagrachhari District(24.53%).

They are the largest ethnic group in Juraichhari Upazila (91.15%), Naniarchar Upazila (79.89%), Barkal Upazila (69.33%), Bagaichhari Upazila (66.19%), Dighinala Upazila (53.38%), Lakshmichhari Upazila (51.33%), Panchhari Upazila (44.04%) and Mahalchhari Upazila (43.52%).

Upazila	District	Percentage of Chakma
Juraichhari Upazila	Rangamati Hill District	91.15%
Naniarchar Upazila	Rangamati Hill District	79.89%
Barkal Upazila	Rangamati Hill District	69.33%
Bagaichhari Upazila	Rangamati Hill District	66.19%
Dighinala Upazila	Khagrachhari District	53.38%
Lakshmichhari Upazila	Khagrachhari District	51.33%
Panchhari Upazila	Khagrachhari District	44.04%
Mahalchhari Upazila	Khagrachhari District	43.52%
Rangamati Sadar Upazila	Rangamati Hill District	41.23%
Khagrachhari Sadar Upazila	Khagrachhari District	27.13%
Belaichhari Upazila	Rangamati Hill District	26.68%
Kaukhali Upazila	Rangamati Hill District	25.92%
Langadu Upazila	Rangamati Hill District	23.74%
Guimara Upazila	Khagrachhari District	7.37%
Matiranga Upazila	Khagrachhari District	3.12%
Ramgarh Upazila	Khagrachhari District	2.77%
Kaptai Upazila	Rangamati Hill District	2.25%
Manikchhari Upazila	Khagrachhari District	1.93%
Thanchi Upazila	Bandarban District	1.67%
Bandarban Sadar Upazila	Bandarban District	1.49%
Others	_	<1%

=== India ===
India hosts around 228,000 Chakmas according to the 2011 Census, primarily in Mizoram (≈92,850), Tripura (≈84,269), Arunachal Pradesh (≈47,073), Assam, West Bengal, Meghalaya, and Nagaland. They are recognised in India as a Scheduled Tribe across these northeastern states.

The construction of the Kaptai Dam in the 1960s displaced tens of thousands, roughly 100,000 Chakmas were relocated to India.

In 1972, under India's Sixth Schedule, the Chakma Autonomous District Council (CADC) was created within Mizoram. Its headquarters is in Kamalanagar. CADC covers around 686 km² and governs administrative, educational, and judicial functions for Chakma-majority areas. In recent years there have been demands for elevating CADC to union territory status, referred to as "Chakmaland".

Chakma communities in Arunachal Pradesh were settled between 1964 and 1969 after displacement owing to the Kaptai Dam. However, since the 1980s some regional groups in Arunachal contested the rights of Chakma settlers, at times viewing them as migrants.

In Tripura, Chakmas settled there over the 18th and 19th centuries. They speak Chakma but are often bilingual in Bengali. As a Scheduled Tribe, they enjoy educational initiatives, yet still face occasional political contention.

== Culture ==
The Chakmas are people with their own culture, folklore, literature and traditions.

=== Traditional attire ===
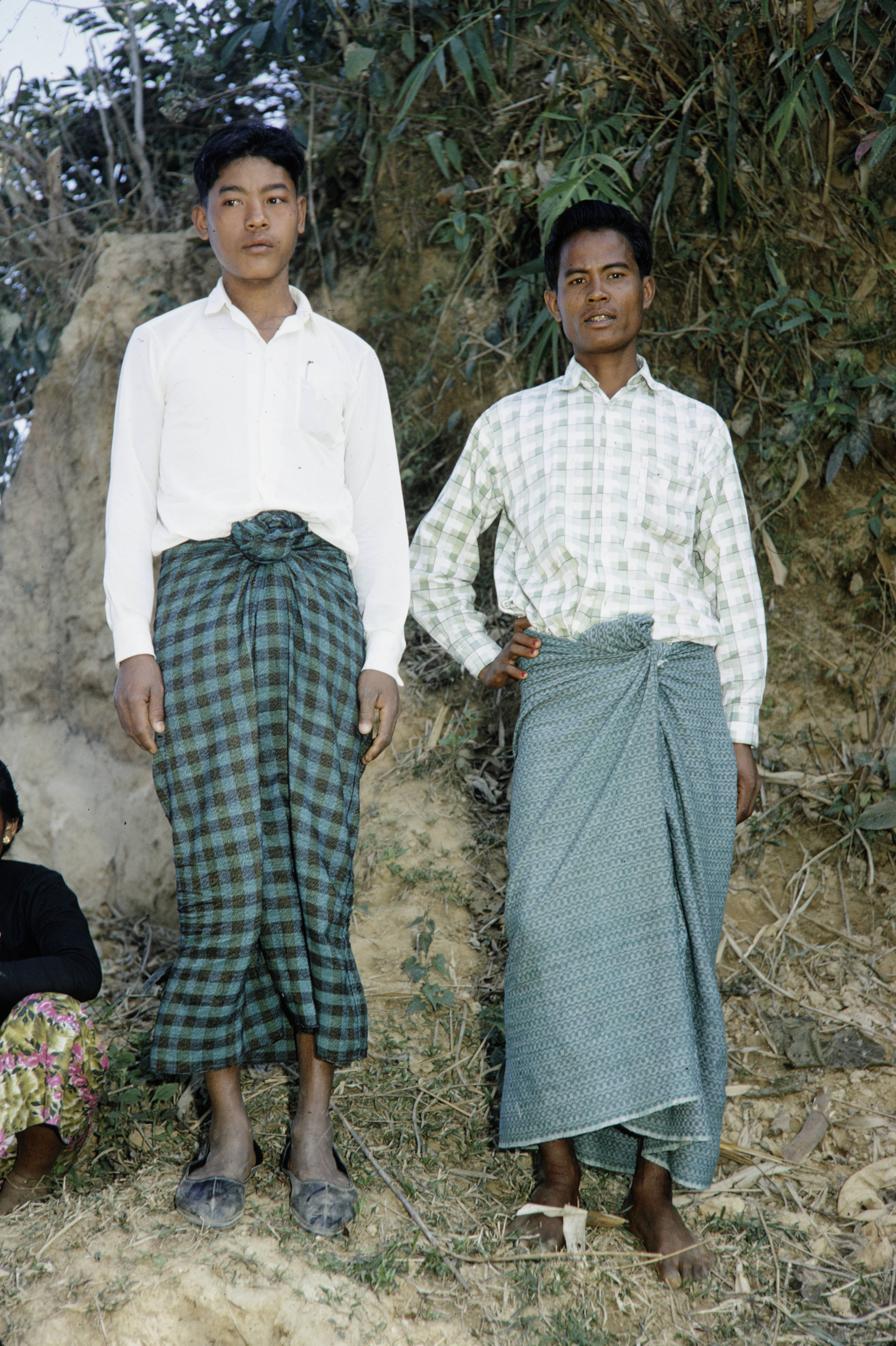
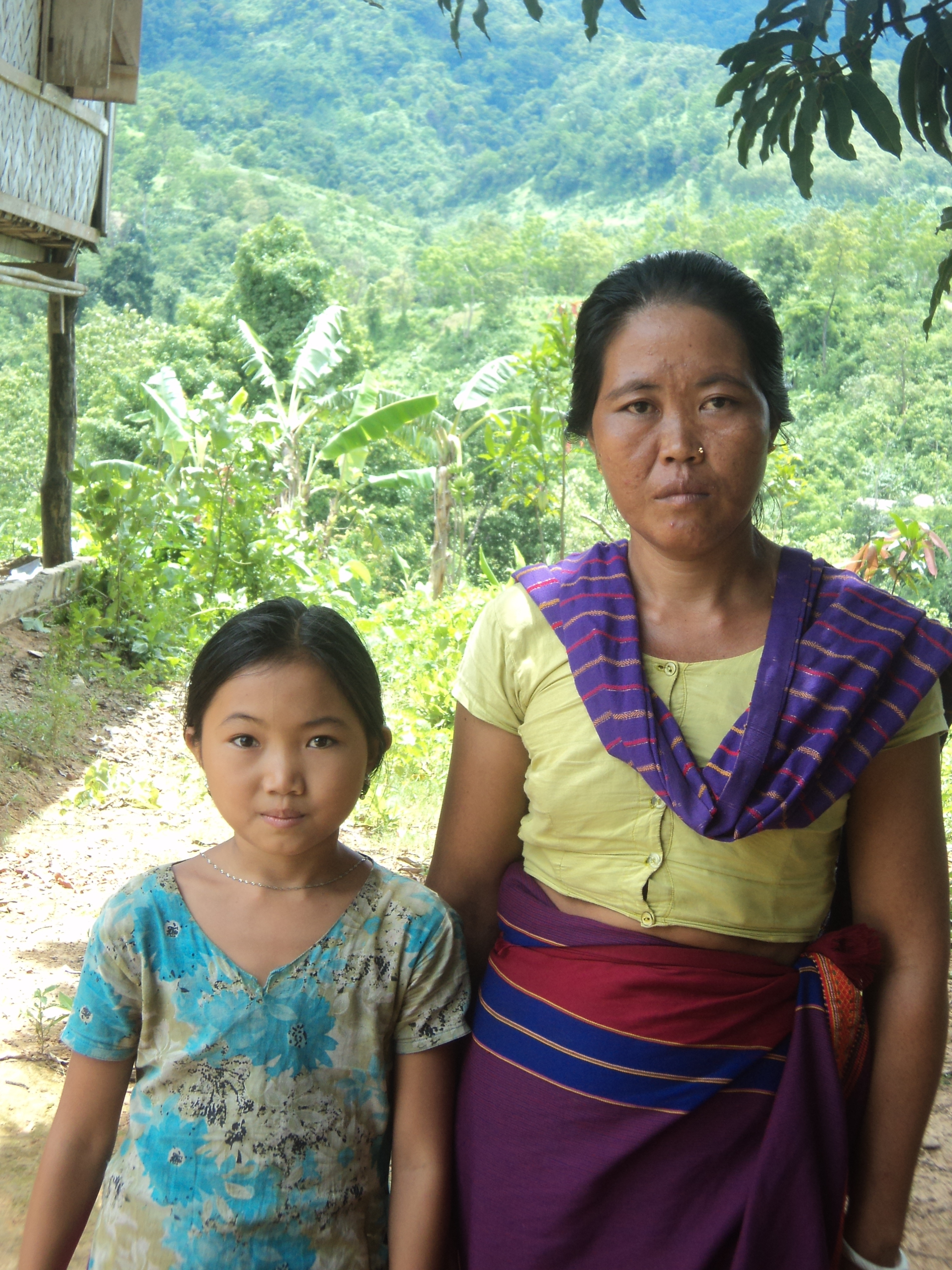
Chakma men (left) and women (right) in traditional dresses

Traditional clothing is a significant part of almost every culture. Chakma women wear Pinon hadi. The pinon (𑄛𑄨𑄚𑄮𑄚𑄴) and the hadi (𑄈𑄘𑄨) are colourfully handwoven with various designs. The design is first embroidered on a piece of cloth known as Alam. Chakma men wear Siluhm (𑄥𑄨𑄣𑄪𑄟𑄴) & Dudi(𑄘𑄪𑄘𑄨) as their traditional outfit.

=== Jhum ===
In the past, most Chakmas practised slash-and-burn cultivation (jhum) as their main occupation. However, many Chakmas today have adopted plough cultivation and some have taken up poultry farming.

=== Traditional house ===
Traditional temporary homes of the Chakma are called mawnógawr. A mawnógawr is constructed with bamboo and thatch, and supported on wooden logs.

=== Festival ===
Chakmas celebrate various Buddhist festivals. The most important is Buddha Purnima or internationally known as Vesak. It is also known as Buddha Birthday worldwide. This is the anniversary of three important events in Buddha's life—his birth, his attainment of enlightenment, and his death. It is observed on the full moon day of the month of Vaisakha (usually in May).

On this and other festival days, Chakmas put on their best clothes and visit the temple. There, they offer flowers to the image of Buddha, light candles, and listen to sermons from the priests. Alms (offerings) are given to the poor, and feasts are held for the priests.

The three-day festival known as Biju/Bizu or Chakma New Year, celebrated with much enthusiasm. This Chakma New Year followed the same Indian calendar that shares the same date of the New Year. This Biju is also celebrated on the same date by various Buddhist countries such as Myanmar Sangrai, Thailand Songkran, Cambodia, Laos, India, Bangladesh, Sinhalese New Year and a few other Asian countries. Houses are decorated with flowers, young children pay special attention to the elderly to win their blessings, visiting Buddhist monasteries, and preparing festive and traditional Chakma dishes for guests are some of the important things.

==== Bizu ====
Bizu is the most important socio-religious festival of the Chakma. Bizu is a Buddhist festival and public holiday in Tripura. This festival gave birth to the Bizu dance. The festival lasts for three days and begins one day before the last day of the month of Chaitra, falling in the month of April. The first day is known as Phool Bizu. On this day, household items, clothes are cleaned and washed, food items are collected to give the house a new look with the veil of different flowers.

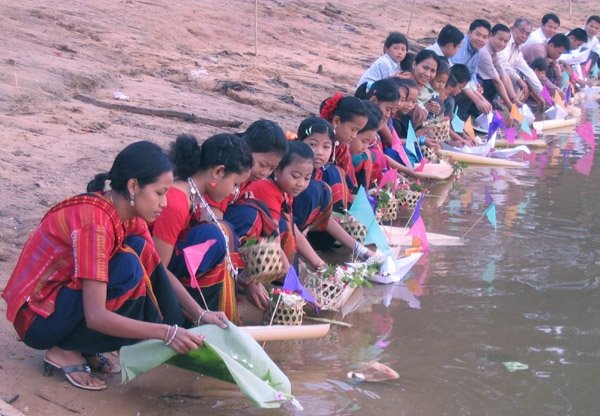
Chakmas celebrating the Bizu festival at Khagrachhari.

The second day is known as Mhul Bizu. This day starts with the bath in the river. People wear new clothes and make rounds of the village. Women wear pinon and hadi while men wear silum and dudi. They also enjoy specially made vegetable curry known as "Paa Zawn Tawn", different homemade sweets like Bawraa-pyi-de, Tsaan-yei pyi-de, Khaw Ga Pyi-de, and Beng Pyi-de; and take part in different traditional sports. The day ends with the Bizu dance.

The last day, which is known as Gawz che Pawz che dyin involves the performances of different socio-religious activities. In the context of its nature, some say that Bizu is a festival, which revolves around agricultural activities because it is celebrated in mid-April when the earth is just drenched with the first rain and the zhum sowing is taken up. And it is believed that with the objective of getting a rich harvest, worship of the earth was arranged, which later on took the form of a festival. However, of late it has lost its agricultural character.

==== Buddha Purnima ====
It is celebrated on the full moon day in the month of Vaisakha. It encompasses the birth, enlightenment (nirvāna), and passing away (Parinirvāna) of Buddha. On the day of the worship, devotees go to the monastery with Shíyong or Qi Yawng (offerings of rice, vegetable and other fruits and confectioneries). The Buddhist monks known as Bhante lead the devotees for the chanting of verses composed in Pali in praise of the holy triple gem: the Buddha, the Dharma (his teachings), and the Sangha (his disciples). Apart from this, other practices such as lighting thousands of lamps and releasing Phanuch Batti (an auspicious lamp made of paper in the form of a balloon) are also done as and when possible.

=== Chakma cuisine ===
Bamboo shoots are a traditional dish for the Chakma people, and they call it Bhaz-chuu-ryì. Shrimp paste and fish paste are their traditional ingredients for cooking, these are called sidol.

The staple food of the Chakmas is rice, supplemented by millet, corn (maize), vegetables, and mustard. The vegetables include yams, pumpkins, melons, and cucumbers. Vegetables and fruit gathered from the forest may be added to the diet. Fish, poultry, and meat are eaten.

Some typical Chakma dishes include fish, vegetables, and spices stuffed into a length of bamboo and cooked in a low fire; foods wrapped in banana leaves and placed beside a fire; and eggs that are aged until they get fermented.

The Chakma tend to mainly cook over an open fire. They eat many types of food (including meats) with rice being a staple, but they usually avoid beef.

=== Sports and games ===
Gudu hara, or Ha-do-do, also known as kabaddi, is a game played throughout the Chakma region. Two teams stand on either side of a central line. They take turns sending a player into opposing territory to touch as many people as they can during the space of one breath, while at the same time saying "Ha-do-do." If the player runs out of breath or is caught by their opponents, they are out. On the other hand, if the player successfully returns to their own territory, the players they have tagged must leave the game.

Gyilhei hara is a game that can be played between two teams or two individuals. A special type of seed called gyi-lhei is used to play the game. Gyilhei seeds are found and grown in wild forests of hills and are similar to bean seeds but bigger in size. When the time comes, the large beans dry out and the seeds known as gyilhei are ready to be collected for use in the game.

Other pastimes include Nadeng Hara, played with a spinning top; and various wrestling games. Pawti hara is a complex traditional game that is played by two teams. Due to how sophisticated its rules are, it is becoming less and less common.

=== Religion ===
The vast majority of the Chakma are followers of Theravada Buddhism, a religion that they have practised for centuries. A minority of Chakmas practice Christianity.

According to a 2011 census report, there are 93,411 people who follow Buddhism in Tripura, Mizoram, India. 7.3% are Christians, as the largest minority. Hinduism follows Christianity as the second-largest minority. This is then followed by Islam and other religious beliefs.

== Language ==
The Chakmas originally spoke a language belonging to the Tibeto-Burman family, which belongs to the Jingpo-Luish tree. But at present days, their language shares many common words or loan words from the Hindi, Pali, Sanskrit, English, Assamese and Bengali languages, due to long years of influence of Bengal. Many linguists now consider the modern Chakma language (known as Changma Bhaz or Changma Hawdha) part of the Eastern Indo-Aryan language group. Changma language is written in its own script, the Chakma script, also known as Awzhapath/Awjhapat. Chakma is written in an alphabet that allows for its cursive form, and is almost identical to the Mon-Khmer and the Lanna (Chiangmai) characters, which was formerly in use in Cambodia, Laos, Thailand and southern parts of Burma. The Chakma script although remains widely unused, with many Chakmas unable to read or write it.

== Genetics ==
The Chakma are strongly related to Tibeto-Burman groups in Northeast India, Southeast Asia and East Asia. The MtDNA of Chakma suggest close clustering with Indian Tibeto-Burman groups especially the Marma and Tripuri. The Y Chromosome Paternal DNA suggest an overwhelming majority of East Asian haplotypes. More than 60% of the Chakma sampled skewed towards Southeast-Asian specific haplogroups mainly Haplogroup O2 and Haplogroup O3.

== See also ==
- Jumma people
- Ethnic groups in the Chittagong Hill Tracts

== Sources ==
- van Schendel, Willem (2002). "Bengalis, Bangladeshis, and Others: Chakma Visions of a Pluralist Bangladesh". In Jahan, Rounaq (ed.). Bangladesh: Promise and Performance. Dhaka: University Press. pp. 65–106. ISBN 978-984-05-1542-4.
- Debnath, Rupak (2025). The Chakma Language Growth and Structure. Delhi: Akansha Publishing House.
- Ping, He (2006). "Rise and fall of Kantu: A historical study of an ancient Tibeto-Burman speaking group[" (PDF). Frontier Histories of China. 4 (1): 535−543. doi:10.1007/s11462-006-0018-9.
- Chawngkunga, C. (1983). Chakma Settlement in Mizoram (PDF). Aizawl: Art and Culture Department of Mizoram.
- Songdong, David (2012). A Grammar of the Kadu (Asak) language. Australia: La Trobe.
