= Pankho people =

The Pankhos
Total population
- 3,200

Regions with significant populations
- Bangladesh: 1,857 (2022)
- India: unknown
- Myanmar: unknown

Languages
- Pankhu language

Religion
- Majority: Christianity; Minority: Buddhism

The Pankhos (Bengali: পাংখো), are a community inhabiting the Chittagong Hill Tracts of Bangladesh and the western areas of Mizoram. They have a population of only 1,857 in Bangladesh according to the 2022 census. In Bangladesh, the Pankhos live in Rangamati Hill District.

The Luseis and Pankhos belong to the Kuki-Chin-Mizo group of people. The Lushai Hills, which is now part of Mizoram, is their original homeland. Though the Luseis and Pankhos are identified as separate tribes, they are culturally very close to each other. Though the Luseis do not understand Pankho language, the latter understand the Lusei language.

== Geographical distribution ==
According to the 2022 Bangladeshi census, there are 1,857 Pankho people in Bangladesh. Specifically, 1,398 (75.28%) Phanko live in Rangamati district.

Upazila	Population	Percentage of Pankho
Belaichhari Upazila	498	1.69%
Rangamati Sadar Upazila	228	0.15%
Barkal Upazila	208	0.42%
Kaptai Upazila	143	0.26%
Baghaichhari Upazila	117	0.11%
Juraichhari Upazila	116	0.43%
Others	<100	

== Religion and culture ==
The Pankhos adopted Christianity during the British period and have adopted western dress and culture.
