= Pinon hadi =

Chakma traditional dress for women

Pinon and Hadi are the Chakma traditional dress for women. Pinon refers to the lower part of the dress that is being wrap around the women hip like a skirt and the Hadi is used for the upper part of the women.

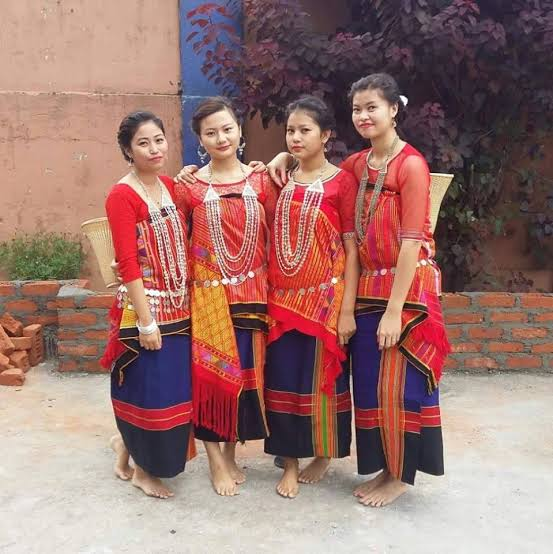
Chakma girls in traditional dress (Pinon hadi)

This attire is a symbol of cultural identity and it also showcases the intricate weaving and textile skills of the Chakma community. The creation of Pinon Hadi involves a meticulous weaving process using a loom called 'Bain'. Chakma women spin threads and weave them into fabric, incorporating various designs to enhance the garment's appeal. The traditional colors of Pinon are black with fine lines of dark blue and red bands.

The designs and patterns carry significant cultural meanings and are worn during various traditional ceremonies and festivals.

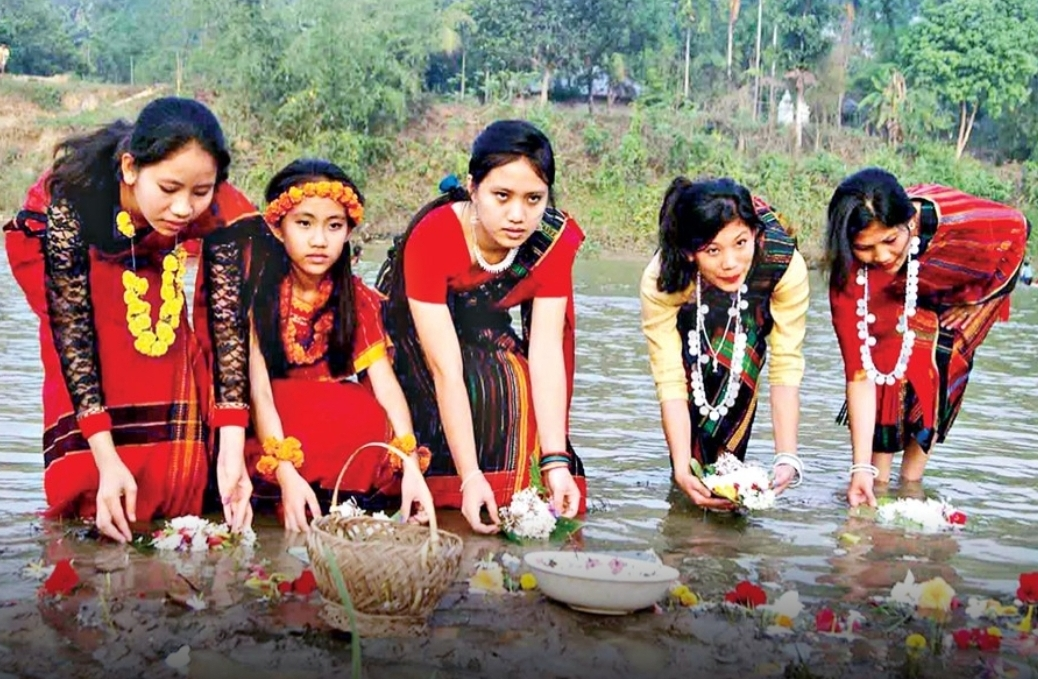
Chakma girls in Pinon Hadi during the Biju Festival

== See also ==
Chakma people
