= Jhum =

Traditional farming method

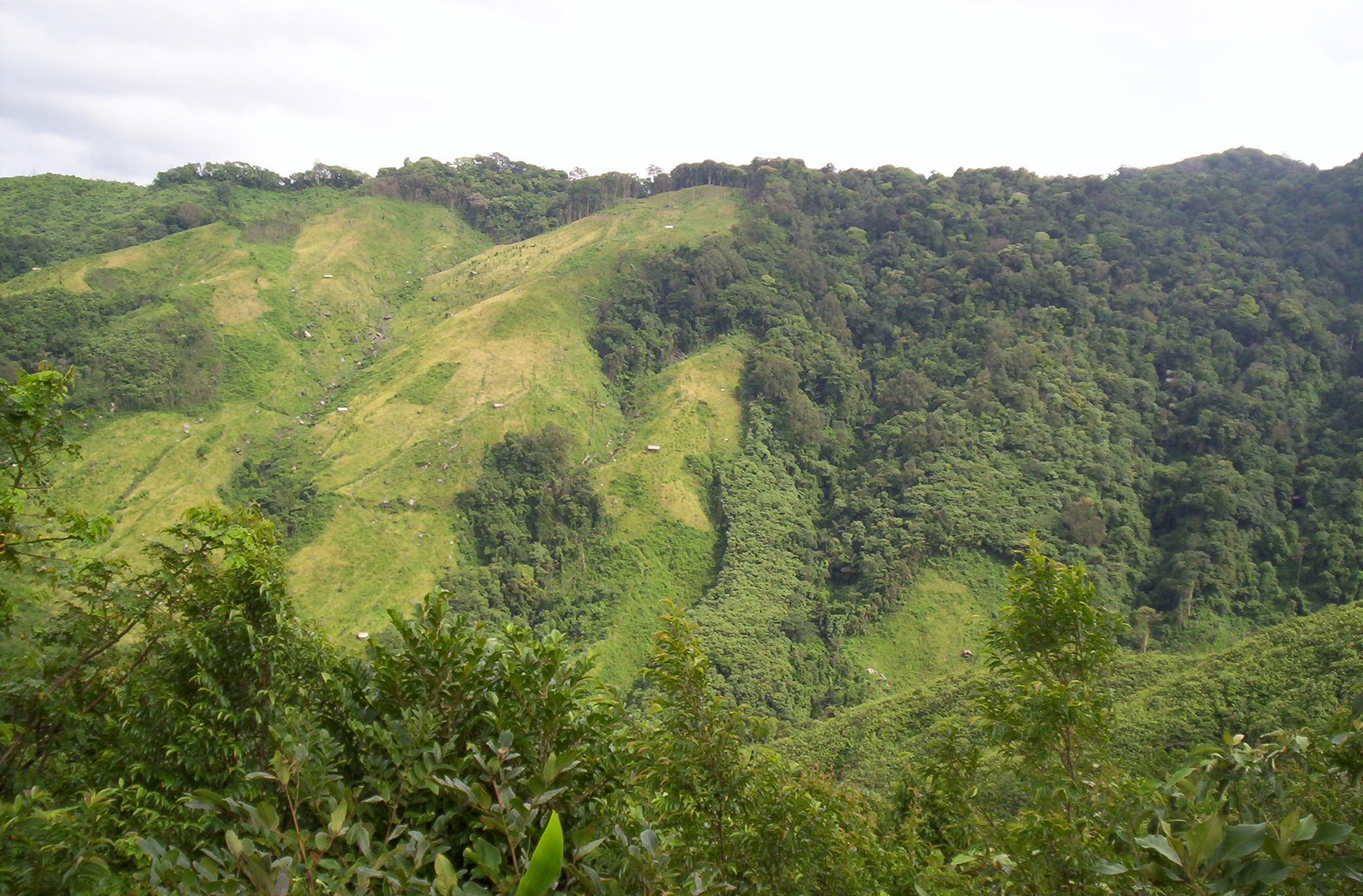
Jhum cultivation in Nokrek Biosphere Reserve, Meghalaya, Northeast India, 2004.

Jhum or jhoom cultivation is the form of slash-and-burn agriculture that is practised in certain parts of Northeast India and by the indigenous communities in Chittagong Hill Tracts of Bangladesh. It is a traditional agricultural technique that involves clearing land of trees and other vegetation, burning it, and then cultivating it for a set number of years.

== Technique and crops ==
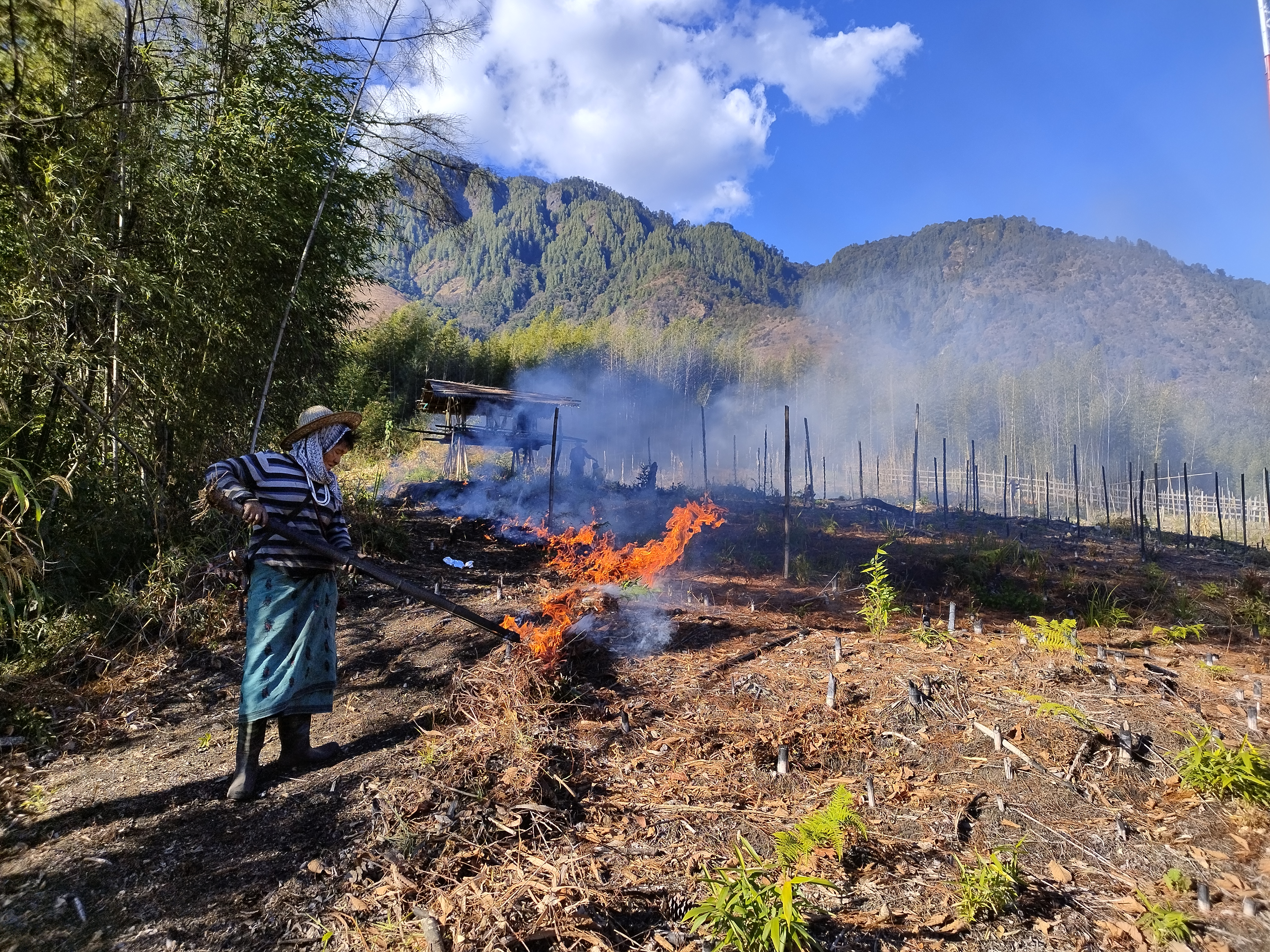
Idu-Mishmi women who practices Jhum cultivation in the Mishmi Hills of Arunachal Pradesh protects their ecosystem by not allowing to spread the fire by creating fireline.

In the month of January, the jhummias cut down the forest on the slope of the hill. Afterwards, they clean the land and dry the wood, bamboo and plants they have cut down in the sun. Later around March–April, the dried material is burnt and made suitable for jhum cultivation.

Next, around May the jhummias dig holes in the burnt jhum soil and sow different types of seeds, including paddy, sweet pumpkin, cotton, sesame, and maize, which are cultivated several months later, depending on the particular crop.

Jhum cultivation does not take place in some years due to drought. Yields are expected to be high if there is no infestation of rats and insects.

Jhum cultivation requires that farmers move their plots from year to year to allow the land to recover. Previously, natural forests of the hills were kept uncultivated for a long time. In recent times, however, the uncultivated period has been dangerously reduced from the traditional ten years to two to three years. This is due to depletion of agricultural land and loss of available land due to population pressure, the Kaptai reservoir, and large-scale non-tribal settlement.

== Drawbacks ==
Jhum cultivation causes extensive damage to the environment. Harmful effects of jhum cultivation include loss of soil fertility, soil erosion, deforestation, destruction of wildlife habitat, and flooding of rivers and lakes. It reduces the soil fertility and crop yield over time and as a result, production declines so much that a Jhummia family cannot survive in one place. The most widely followed minimum seven to eight-year cycle is currently reduced to three to four years which is not at all sufficient. Due to these reasons, the crop yield has declined substantially, making it critical to devise suitable alternatives to jhum cultivation.
