= Tanchangya =

Tanchangya or Tongchangya may refer to:

- Tanchangya people, a tribal people of Bangladesh, India and Myanmar
- Tanchangya language, their Indo-Aryan language
- Tanchangya script, an abugida script for the language
