= Belaichhari =

Belaichhari may refer to:

- Belaichhari Upazila, an upazila of Rangamati District
- Belaichhari Union, a union of Belaichhari Upazila under Rangamati District
