= Juraichhari =

Juraichhari may refer to:

- Juraichhari Upazila, an upazila of Rangamati District
- Juraichhari Union, a union of Juraichhari Upazila under Rangamati District
