= Magban Union =

Union of Rangamati District, Chittagong, Bangladesh

Magban মগবান
- Union
- Interactive map of Magban
- Country: Bangladesh
- Division: Chittagong Division
- District: Rangamati District
- Upazila: Rangamati Sadar Upazila

Area
  - Total: 82.88 km^{2} (32.00 sq mi)

Population (2022)
  - Total: 7,494
  - Density: 90.42/km^{2} (234.2/sq mi)
- Time zone: UTC+6 (BST)
- Postal code: 4500
- Website: mogbanup.rangamati.gov.bd

Magban Union is a union of Rangamati Sadar Upazila under Rangamati District.

== Demography ==
According to 2022 census, total population of the Union are 7,494. Among them, 565 are Muslim, 6,913 are Buddhist, 10 are Hindu and 6 are Christian.

Religion-2022
1. Buddhism (92.2%)
2. Islam (7.54%)
3. Hinduism (0.13%)
4. Christianity (0.08%)
5. Others (0.00%)

== Ethnicity ==
This Union is home to a variety of different ethnic groups. Among them, 595 are Bengali, 5,087 are Chakma, 1,497 are Tanchangya, 310 are Marma and 5 are of others ethnic groups.

Ethnicity-2022
1. Chakma (67.9%)
2. Tanchangya (20.0%)
3. Bengali (7.94%)
4. Marma (4.14%)
5. Others (0.07%)
