= Rowangchhari Upazila =

Rowangchhari রোয়াংছড়ি
- Upazila
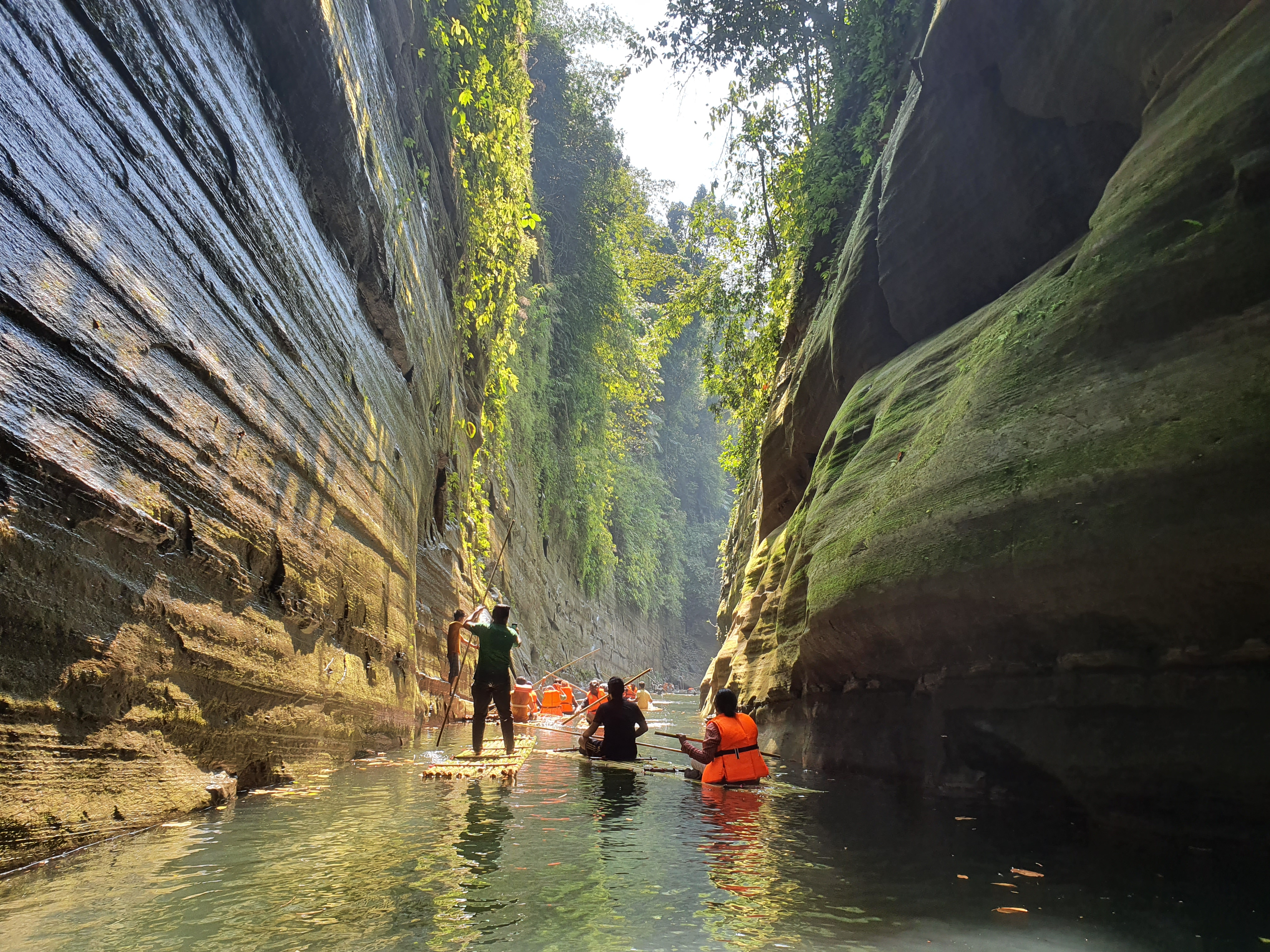
- Debotakhum

- Coordinates: 22°10′N 92°20′E
- Country: Bangladesh
- Division: Chittagong
- District: Bandarban

Government
  - Upazila Chairman: Chohaimong Marma
  - MP (Bandarban): Ushwe Sing

Area
  - Total: 442.88 km^{2} (171.00 sq mi)

Population (2022)
  - Total: 27,721
  - Density: 62.593/km^{2} (162.11/sq mi)
- Time zone: UTC+6 (BST)
- Postal code: 4610
- Website: rowangchhari.bandarban.gov.bd

Rowangchhari Upazila mauza geocode map

Rowangchhari (Bengali: রোয়াংছড়ি) is an upazila (sub-district) of Bandarban District in southeastern Bangladesh, part of the Chittagong Division.

== History ==
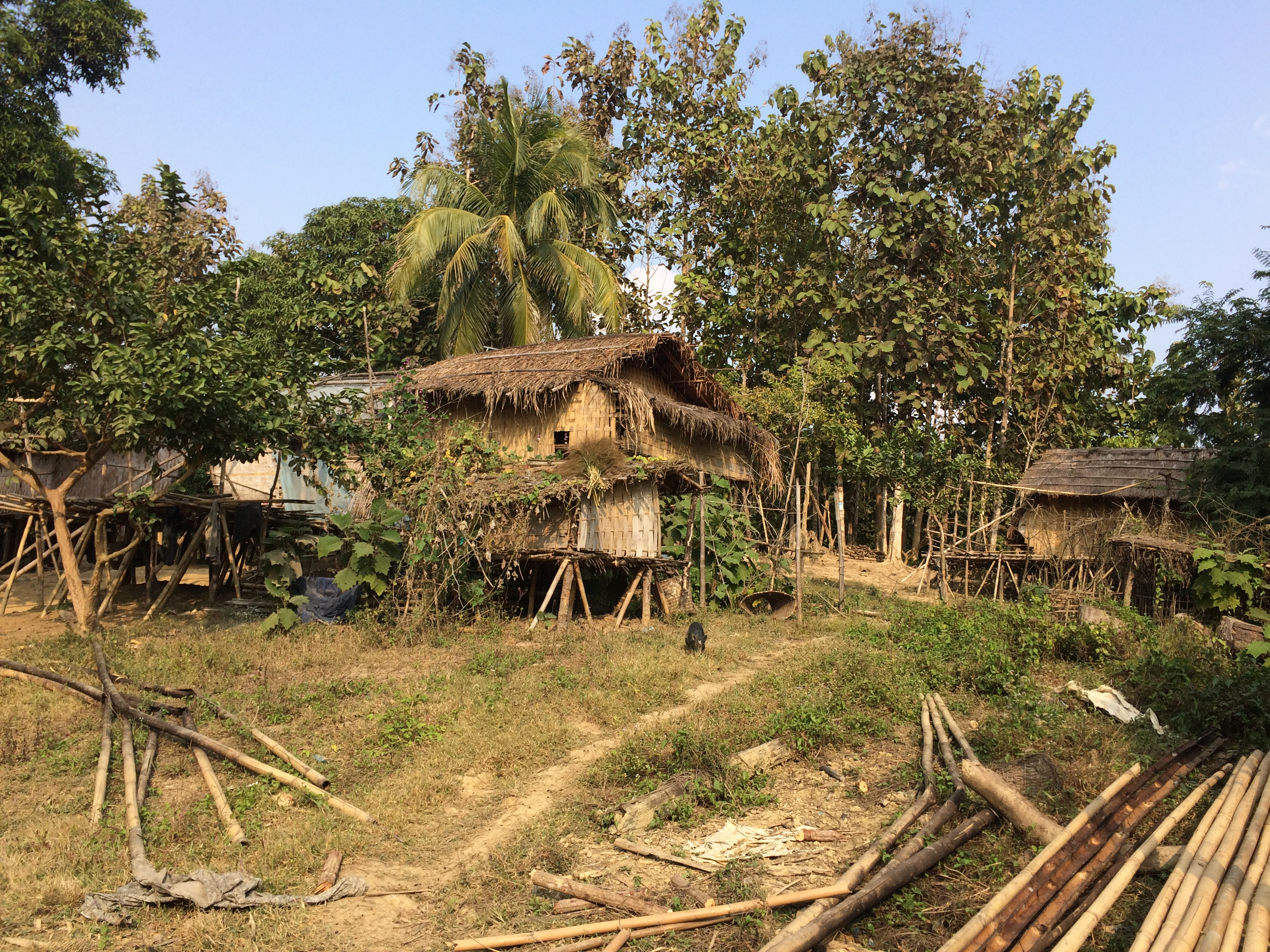
A house in Rowangchhari.

In the 16th century, the Marma people emigrated here from the Kingdom of Mrauk U in Arakan. Where the Rakhaing stream (known as a chhara in Bengali) meets the Tarachha canal, the Marmas established a settlement known as Rakhaing Wah, meaning the "Rakhaing river mouth". Bengalis from the nearby Chittagong District later arrived in the area for trade and commercial purposes. Over time, Rakhaing Wah grew into a haat bazaar and became known to Bengalis as Rowangchhari (Rowang is the Chittagonian word for Arakan and chhari refers to a small stream).

During the Bangladesh Liberation War of 1971, a brawl took place in Nowapatang Union leading to the death of T. N. Ali, a Bengali freedom fighter. Shamsul Islam ibn Amir Hamzah of Main Road and Dr S. A. Mahiuddin ibn Muhammad Abdur Rashid of Rowangchhari Bazar also fought in the war. There are also seven other individuals from Rowangchhari not mentioned in the official gazette that are said to have taken part. These are: Tarachha's Muhammad Ibrahim ibn Jalal Ahmad, Foraq Ahmad ibn Kala Mia, Qazi Muhammad Thanaullah ibn Qazi Ahmad Safa, Liaqat Ali ibn Faiz Ahmad and Muhammad Abdul Wadud ibn Siraj Ahmad, Rowangchhari Bazar's Abul Hasan Mir ibn Habibullah Mir, Abdul Aziz Chowdhury ibn Ashab Mia Chowdhury and Ejahan Mia ibn Dudu Mia.

In 1976, Rowangchhari was established as a thana. Its status was upgraded to upazila (sub-district) in 1983 as part of the President of Bangladesh Hussain Muhammad Ershad's decentralisation programme.

== Geography ==
Rowangchhari is located at 22.1667°N 92.3333°E. It has a total area of 442.88 km^{2}.

== Demographics ==
According to the 2022 Bangladeshi census, Rowangchhari Upazila had 7,310 households and a population of 27,721. 9.58% of the population were under 5 years of age. Rowangchhari had a literacy rate (age 7 and over) of 55.27%: 65.14% for males and 45.20% for females, and a sex ratio of 101.89 males for every 100 females. 5,452 (19.67%) lived in urban areas.

=== Ethnicity and religion ===
Religions in Rowangchhari Upazila (2022)
Religion	Percent
Buddhism	67.58%
Christianity	17.83%
Islam	7.87%
Hinduism	0.76%
Other or not stated	5.97%

Population by religion in Union
Union	Muslim	Buddhist	Christian	Hindu	Others
Alekyong	371	4,558	1,006	75	0
Nawapotong	83	3,687	774	10	0
Rowangchhari	426	5,859	2,305	94	1
Taracha	1,301	4,629	857	31	1,653

🟨 Buddhist majority

As of the 2022 Bangladeshi census, Rowangchhari upazila had a population of 27,721. The ethnic population was 24,808 (89.49%), of which Marma were 13,716,Tanchangya 3,990, Tripura 2,143, Bom 1,882 and Mru 1,685.

Rowangchhari is an ethnically diverse sub-district of Bangladesh. It is home to the Marma people who speak Arakanese, the Bawm who speak Bawm, the Tanchangya who speak Tanchangya, the Mru who speak Mru, the Khumi who speak Khumi Chin, the Khyang who speak Shö and the Bengalis who speak the Chittagonian dialect of Bengali.

Ethnicity in Rowangchhari Upazila (2022)
1. Marma (49.5%)
2. Tanchangya (14.4%)
3. Bengali (10.5%)
4. Tripura (7.73%)
5. Bom (6.79%)
6. Mro (6.08%)
7. Khyang (2.35%)
8. Khumi (1.57%)
9. Others (1.10%)

Population by ethnicity in Union
Union	Bengali	Marma	Mro	Tripura	Others
Alekyong	608	2,387	0	764	2,252
Nawapotong	106	2,645	0	520	1,283
Rowangchhari	810	4,195	2	402	3,276
Taracha	1,389	4,489	1,683	457	453

🟦 Marma majority

== Administration ==
Rowangchhari Upazila is divided into four union parishads: Alekyong, Nawapotong, Rowangchhari Sadar, and Taracha. The union parishads are subdivided into 13 mauzas and 178 villages.

List of chairmen
Name	Date	Notes
Kya Shai Aung	25/5/1985	
Hla Thowai Hri Marma	23/2/2009-16/4/2014	
Kyaba Maung Marma	17/4/2014	
Mausang Marma	30/3/2017-24/4/2019	Panel chairman, first female
Chohaimong Marma	9/5/2019-present	

== Facilities ==
There are 43 churches, 41 Buddhist temples, 5 Hindu temples and 12 mosques in Rowangchhari. There are two madrasas in Rowangchhari; the North Chhaingya Nurani Madrasa and the West Chhaingya Nurani Madrasa. The mosques are:

1. Rowangchhari Jame Mosque, Rowangchhari Bazar
2. Rowangchhari Wagaipar Jame Mosque
3. North Chhaingya Jame Mosque
4. South Chhaingya Jame Mosque
5. Middle Chhaingya Jame Mosque
6. East Chhaingya Jame Mosque
7. Gherau Bazar Jame Mosque
8. Betchhara Bazar Jame Mosque
9. Tarachha Mukh Jame Mosque
10. Muramnango Police Camp Jame Mosque
11. Banchhaya Jame Mosque, Alekkhang Union
12. Kachhaptali Para Army Camp Jame Mosque, Alekkhang Union

The upazila includes several notable natural and cultural sites such as the Ramjadi Temple, reached by a 350-foot stair climb outside Bandarban town, and Devtakhum, a deep 600-foot-long khum hidden in dense forest. The area also features Tinap Saitar, Bangladesh's largest waterfall by water flow, along with Shilbandha Jharna and the trekking routes toward Sippi Pahar and Ronin Para.

== See also ==
- Upazilas of Bangladesh
- Districts of Bangladesh
- Divisions of Bangladesh
