= Barathali Union =

Union of Rangamati District, Chittagong, Bangladesh

Barathali বড়থলি
- Union
- Interactive map of Barathali
- Country: Bangladesh
- Division: Chittagong Division
- District: Rangamati District
- Upazila: Belaichhari Upazila

Population (2022)
  - Total: 3,595
- Time zone: UTC+6 (BST)
- Postal code: 4550

Barathali Union is a union of Belaichhari Upazila under Rangamati District.

== Demography ==
According to 2022 census, total population of the Union are 3,595. Among them, 336 are Muslim, 1,731 are Buddhist, 1,422 are Christian, 11 are Hindu and 95 follow others religion.

Religion-2022
1. Buddhism (48.1%)
2. Christianity (39.5%)
3. Islam (9.35%)
4. Hinduism (0.31%)
5. Others (2.64%)

== Ethnicity ==
This Union is home to a variety of different ethnic groups. Among them, 582 are Bengali, 1,087 are Tanchangya, 490 are Marma and 1,436 are of others ethnic groups.

Ethnicity-2022
1. Tanchangya (30.2%)
2. Bengali (16.2%)
3. Marma (13.6%)
4. Tripura and Others (40.0%)
