= Farua Union =

Union of Rangamati District, Chittagong, Bangladesh

Farua ফারুয়া
- Union
- Interactive map of Farua
- Country: Bangladesh
- Division: Chittagong Division
- District: Rangamati District
- Upazila: Belaichhari Upazila

Area
  - Total: 556.85 km^{2} (215.00 sq mi)

Population (2022)
  - Total: 11,385
  - Density: 20.445/km^{2} (52.953/sq mi)
- Time zone: UTC+6 (BST)
- Postal code: 4550
- Website: faruaup.rangamati.gov.bd

Farua Union is a union of Belaichhari Upazila under Rangamati District.

== Demography ==
According to 2022 census, total population of the Union are 11,385. Among them, 503 are Muslim, 9,735 are Buddhist, 1,045 are Christian and 102 are Hindu.

Religion-2022
1. Buddhism (85.5%)
2. Christianity (9.18%)
3. Islam (4.42%)
4. Hinduism (0.89%)
5. Others (0.00%)

== Ethnicity ==
This Union is home to a variety of different ethnic groups. Among them, 1,326 are Bengali, 7,016 are Tanchangya, 1,012 are Marma, 983 are Chakma and 1,048 are of others ethnic groups.

Ethnicity-2022
1. Tanchangya (61.6%)
2. Bengali (11.7%)
3. Marma (8.89%)
4. Chakma (8.63%)
5. Tripura and Others (9.21%)
