= Chakma script =

Writing system used for Chakma language

Chakma Changmha Ajhapat 𑄌𑄋𑄴𑄟𑄳𑄦 𑄃𑄧𑄏𑄛𑄖𑄴
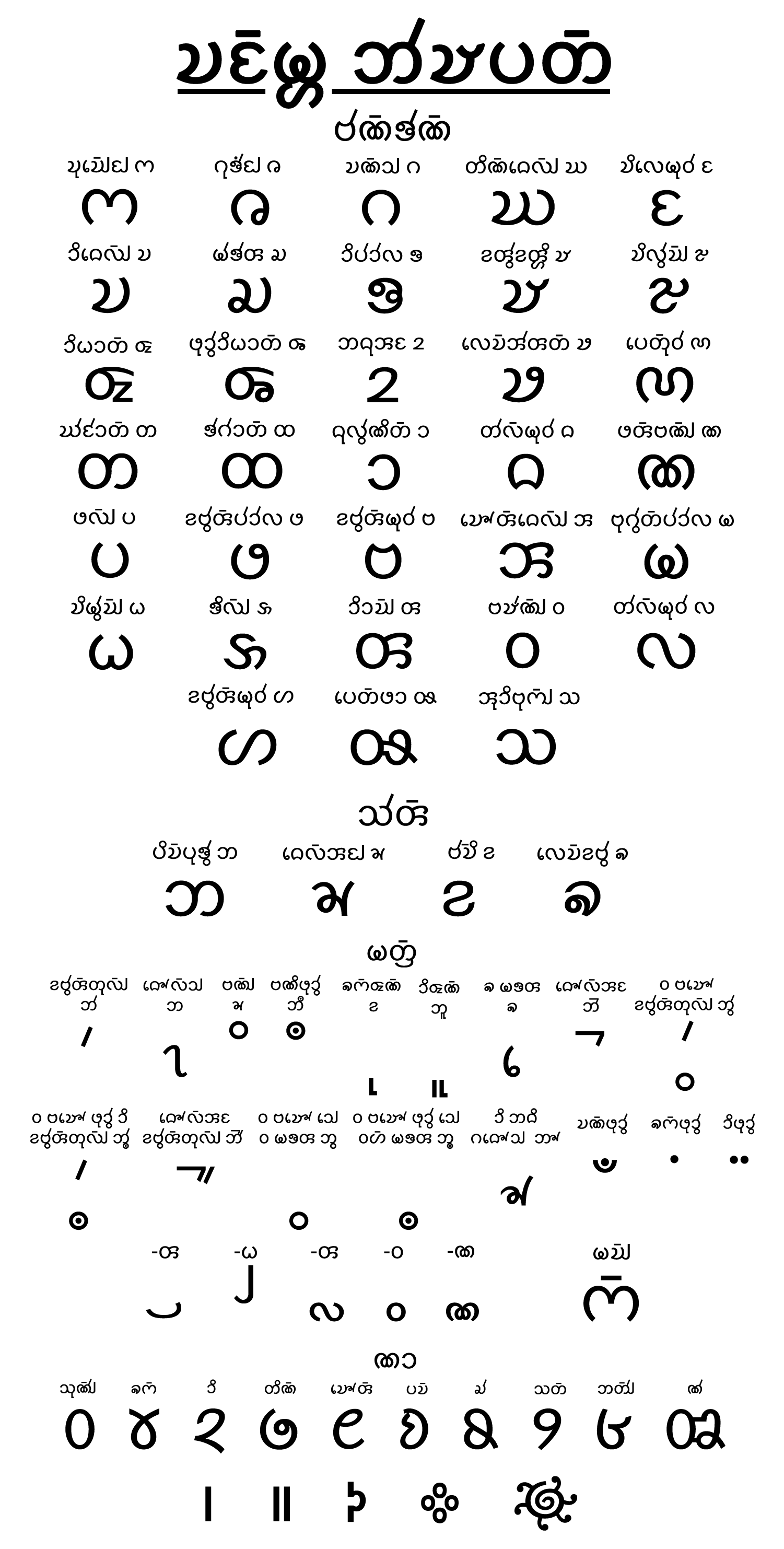
- Chakma Ajhā Pāṭh Alphabet Chart
- Script type: Abugida
- Period: 13th century? - present
- Direction: Left-to-right
- Languages: Chakma language, Pali,Tanchangya language

Related scripts
- Parent systems: Proto-Sinaitic alphabet: Phoenician alphabet; Aramaic alphabet; Brahmi script; Tamil-Brahmi; Pallava script; Mon–Burmese script; Chakma
- Sister systems: Burmese script; Mon script; S'gaw Karen alphabet; Khmer script; Ahom alphabet; Tanchangya script

ISO 15924
- ISO 15924: Cakm (349), Chakma

Unicode
- Unicode alias: Chakma
- Unicode range: U+11100–U+1114F

The Chakma Script (Chakma: 𑄌𑄋𑄴𑄟𑄳𑄦 𑄃𑄧𑄏𑄛𑄖𑄴), also called Ajhā Pāṭh, is an abugida used for the Chakma language, and recently for the Pali language.

== History ==
The Chakma script is an abugida that belongs to the Brahmic family of scripts. Chakma evolved from the Burmese script, which was ultimately derived from Pallava. The Chakma script is stated to be derived from the Arakanese script, on the basis of its letter forms. The Chakma script probably developed in Arakan up to the 13th century, before the Chakma people migrated into Chittagong in the 14th century.

The script, along with the Chakma language, has been introduced to non-government schools in Bangladesh, and as well as schools in Mizoram.

== Structure ==
The word 'Changmha Ajhapat' in Chakma script

Chakma is of the Brahmic type: the consonant letters contain an inherent vowel. Unusually for Eastern Indo-Aryan languages, the inherent vowel in Chakma is a long 'ā' (a) as opposed to short 'a' (ɔ). Consonant clusters are written with conjunct characters, and a visible vowel killer shows the deletion of the inherent vowel when there is no conjunct.

=== Independent vowels ===
Four independent vowels exist:

𑄃 ā IPA: aː	𑄄 i IPA: i	𑄅 u IPA: u	𑄆 e IPA: eː

Other vowels in initial position are formed by adding the vowel sign to 𑄃 ā, as in 𑄃𑄩 ī, 𑄃𑄫 ū, 𑄃𑄭 ai, 𑄃𑄰 oi. Some modern writers are generalizing this spelling in 𑄃𑄨 i, 𑄃𑄪 u, and 𑄃𑄬 e.

=== Dependent vowels ===
𑄧 a IPA: [ɔ]	𑅅 aa IPA: [a]	𑄨 i IPA: [i]	𑄩 ii IPA: [i]	𑄪 u IPA: [u]	𑄫 uu IPA: [u]
𑄬 e IPA: [e/ɛ]	𑄭 ai IPA: [ai̯]	𑄮 o IPA: [o]	𑄯 au IPA: [ou̯]	𑄰 oi IPA: [ɔi̯]	𑄱 o IPA: [o]
𑄲 au IPA: [ou̯]	𑅆 ei IPA: [ei]	𑄀 candrabindu IPA: [ -̃ ]	𑄁 anusvara IPA: [ŋ]	𑄂 visarga IPA: [h]	

One of the interesting features of Chakma writing is that candrabindu 𑄀 (cānaphudā) can be used together with anusvara 𑄁 (ekaphudā) and visarga 𑄂 (dviphudā):

𑄃𑄂𑄀 aḥṃ = 𑄃 ā + 𑄂 h + 𑄀ṃ

𑄃𑄁𑄀 aṃṃ = 𑄃 ā + 𑄁 ṃ + 𑄀ṃ

𑄅𑄁𑄀 uṃṃ = 𑄅 u + 𑄁 ṃ + 𑄀ṃ

𑄟𑄪𑄀 muṃ = 𑄟 mā + 𑄪 u + 𑄀ṃ

=== Consonants ===
𑄇 kā	𑄈 khā	𑄉 gā	𑄊 ghā	𑄋 ṅā
𑄌 cā	𑄍 chā	𑄎 jā	𑄏 jhā	𑄐 ñā
𑄑 ṭā	𑄒 ṭhā	𑄓 ḍā	𑄔 ḍhā	𑄕 ṇā
𑄖 tā	𑄗 thā	𑄘 dā	𑄙 dhā	𑄚 nā
𑄛 pā	𑄜 phā	𑄝 bā	𑄞 bhā	𑄟 mā
𑄠 yyā	𑄡 yā	𑄢 rā	𑄣 lā	𑄤𑅇 wā / vā
	𑄥 sā	𑄦 hā	𑅄 ḷā	

==== Vowel-killer ====
Like other Brahmic scripts, Chakma makes use of the maayyaa (killer) to invoke conjoined consonants. In the past, practice was much more common than it is today. Like the Myanmar script, Chakma is encoded with two vowel-killing characters in order to conform to modern user expectations. As shown above, most letters have their vowels killed with the use of the explicit maayyaa:

𑄇𑄴 k = 𑄇 kā + 𑄴 MAAYYAA

==== Conjucts ====
In 2001 an orthographic reform was recommended in the book Cāṅmā pattham pāt which would limit the standard repertoire of conjuncts to those composed with the five letters 𑄠 yā, 𑄢 rā, 𑄣 lā, 𑄤 wā, and 𑄚 nā. The four here are the most widely accepted repertoire of conjuncts. No separate conjunct forms of subjoined full-form -yā or -rā appear to exist. The fifth of these conjuncts, the -na conjunct, is exemplary of the orthographic shift which has taken place in the Chakma language.

Consonant	𑄳𑄠: yyā	𑄳𑄢: rā	𑄳𑄣: lā	𑄳𑄤: wā	𑄳𑄚: nā
𑄇 k	𑄇𑄳𑄠	𑄇𑄳𑄢	𑄇𑄳𑄣	𑄇𑄳𑄤	𑄇𑄳𑄚
𑄈 kh	𑄈𑄳𑄠	𑄈𑄳𑄢	𑄈𑄳𑄣	𑄈𑄳𑄤	𑄈𑄳𑄚
𑄉 g	𑄉𑄳𑄠	𑄉𑄳𑄢	𑄉𑄳𑄣	𑄉𑄳𑄤	𑄉𑄳𑄚
𑄊 gh	𑄊𑄳𑄠	𑄊𑄳𑄢	𑄊𑄳𑄣	𑄊𑄳𑄤	𑄊𑄳𑄚
𑄋 ṅ	𑄋𑄳𑄠	𑄋𑄳𑄢	𑄋𑄳𑄣	𑄋𑄳𑄤	𑄋𑄳𑄚
𑄌 c	𑄌𑄳𑄠	𑄌𑄳𑄢	𑄌𑄳𑄣	𑄌𑄳𑄤	𑄌𑄳𑄚
𑄍 ch	𑄍𑄳𑄠	𑄍𑄳𑄢	𑄍𑄳𑄣	𑄍𑄳𑄤	𑄍𑄳𑄚
𑄎 j	𑄎𑄳𑄠	𑄎𑄳𑄢	𑄎𑄳𑄣	𑄎𑄳𑄤	𑄎𑄳𑄚
𑄏 jh	𑄏𑄳𑄠	𑄏𑄳𑄢	𑄏𑄳𑄣	𑄏𑄳𑄤	𑄏𑄳𑄚
𑄐 ñ	𑄐𑄳𑄠	𑄐𑄳𑄢	𑄐𑄳𑄣	𑄐𑄳𑄤	𑄐𑄳𑄚
𑄑 ṭ	𑄑𑄳𑄠	𑄑𑄳𑄢	𑄑𑄳𑄣	𑄑𑄳𑄤	𑄑𑄳𑄚
𑄒 ṭh	𑄒𑄳𑄠	𑄒𑄳𑄢	𑄒𑄳𑄣	𑄒𑄳𑄤	𑄒𑄳𑄚
𑄓 ḍ	𑄓𑄳𑄠	𑄓𑄳𑄢	𑄓𑄳𑄣	𑄓𑄳𑄤	𑄓𑄳𑄚
𑄔 ḍh	𑄔𑄳𑄠	𑄔𑄳𑄢	𑄔𑄳𑄣	𑄔𑄳𑄤	𑄔𑄳𑄚
𑄕 ṇ	𑄕𑄳𑄠	𑄕𑄳𑄢	𑄕𑄳𑄣	𑄕𑄳𑄤	𑄕𑄳𑄚
𑄖 t	𑄖𑄳𑄠	𑄖𑄳𑄢	𑄖𑄳𑄣	𑄖𑄳𑄤	𑄖𑄳𑄚
𑄗 th	𑄗𑄳𑄠	𑄗𑄳𑄢	𑄗𑄳𑄣	𑄗𑄳𑄤	𑄗𑄳𑄚
𑄘 d	𑄘𑄳𑄠	𑄘𑄳𑄢	𑄘𑄳𑄣	𑄘𑄳𑄤	𑄘𑄳𑄚
𑄙 dh	𑄙𑄳𑄠	𑄙𑄳𑄢	𑄙𑄳𑄣	𑄙𑄳𑄤	𑄙𑄳𑄚
𑄚 n	𑄚𑄳𑄠	𑄚𑄳𑄢	𑄚𑄳𑄣	𑄚𑄳𑄤	𑄚𑄳𑄚
𑄛 p	𑄛𑄳𑄠	𑄛𑄳𑄢	𑄛𑄳𑄣	𑄛𑄳𑄤	𑄛𑄳𑄚
𑄜 ph	𑄜𑄳𑄠	𑄜𑄳𑄢	𑄜𑄳𑄣	𑄜𑄳𑄤	𑄜𑄳𑄚
𑄝 b	𑄝𑄳𑄠	𑄝𑄳𑄢	𑄝𑄳𑄣	𑄝𑄳𑄤	𑄝𑄳𑄚
𑄞 bh	𑄞𑄳𑄠	𑄞𑄳𑄢	𑄞𑄳𑄣	𑄞𑄳𑄤	𑄞𑄳𑄚
𑄟 m	𑄟𑄳𑄠	𑄟𑄳𑄢	𑄟𑄳𑄣	𑄟𑄳𑄤	𑄟𑄳𑄚
𑄠 yy	𑄠𑄳𑄠	𑄠𑄳𑄢	𑄠𑄳𑄣	𑄠𑄳𑄤	𑄠𑄳𑄚
𑄡 y	𑄡𑄳𑄠	𑄡𑄳𑄢	𑄡𑄳𑄣	𑄡𑄳𑄤	𑄡𑄳𑄚
𑄢 r	𑄢𑄳𑄠	𑄢𑄳𑄢	𑄢𑄳𑄣	𑄢𑄳𑄤	𑄢𑄳𑄚
𑄤 w	𑄤𑄳𑄠	𑄤𑄳𑄢	𑄤𑄳𑄣	𑄤𑄳𑄤	𑄤𑄳𑄚
𑄥 s	𑄥𑄳𑄠	𑄥𑄳𑄢	𑄥𑄳𑄣	𑄥𑄳𑄤	𑄥𑄳𑄚
𑄦 h	𑄦𑄳𑄠	𑄦𑄳𑄢	𑄦𑄳𑄣	𑄦𑄳𑄤	𑄦𑄳𑄚

While some writers would indeed write kakna (in ligating style) as 𑄇𑄇𑄳𑄚 or (in subjoining style) as 𑄇𑄇𑄳𑄚, most now would probably expect it to be written as 𑄇𑄇𑄴𑄚. The ligating style of glyphs is now considered old-fashioned. Thus, taking the letter 𑄟 mā as the second element, while the glyph shapes 𑄇𑄳𑄟 kmā, 𑄖𑄳𑄟 tmā, 𑄚𑄳𑄟 nmā, 𑄝𑄳𑄝 bbā, 𑄟𑄳𑄟 mmā, 𑄣𑄳𑄣 llā, 𑄥𑄳𑄟 smā, and 𑄦𑄳𑄟 hmā are attested, most users now prefer the glyph shapes 𑄇𑄳𑄟 kmā, 𑄖𑄳𑄟 tmā, 𑄚𑄳𑄟 nmā, 𑄝𑄳𑄝 bbā, 𑄟𑄳𑄟 mmā, 𑄣𑄳𑄣 llā, 𑄥𑄳𑄟 smā, and 𑄦𑄳𑄟 hmā. Again, this distinction is stylistic and not orthographic.

The 2004 book Phadagaṅ shows examples of the five conjuncts above together alongside conjuncts formed with 𑄝 bā, 𑄟 mā, and 𑄦 hā. These are all formed by simple subjoining.

Consonant	𑄳𑄝: bā	𑄳𑄟: mā	𑄳𑄦: hā
𑄇 k	𑄇𑄳𑄝	𑄇𑄳𑄟	𑄇𑄳𑄦
𑄈 kh	𑄈𑄳𑄝	𑄈𑄳𑄟	𑄈𑄳𑄦
𑄉 g	𑄉𑄳𑄝	𑄉𑄳𑄟	𑄉𑄳𑄦
𑄊 gh	𑄊𑄳𑄝	𑄊𑄳𑄟	𑄊𑄳𑄦
𑄋 ṅ	𑄋𑄳𑄝	𑄋𑄳𑄟	𑄋𑄳𑄦
𑄌 c	𑄌𑄳𑄝	𑄌𑄳𑄟	𑄌𑄳𑄦
𑄍 ch	𑄍𑄳𑄝	𑄍𑄳𑄟	𑄍𑄳𑄦
𑄎 j	𑄎𑄳𑄝	𑄎𑄳𑄟	𑄎𑄳𑄦
𑄏 jh	𑄏𑄳𑄝	𑄏𑄳𑄟	𑄏𑄳𑄦
𑄐 ñ	𑄐𑄳𑄝	𑄐𑄳𑄟	𑄐𑄳𑄦
𑄑 ṭ	𑄑𑄳𑄝	𑄑𑄳𑄟	𑄑𑄳𑄦
𑄒 ṭh	𑄒𑄳𑄝	𑄒𑄳𑄟	𑄒𑄳𑄦
𑄓 ḍ	𑄓𑄳𑄝	𑄓𑄳𑄟	𑄓𑄳𑄦
𑄔 ḍh	𑄔𑄳𑄝	𑄔𑄳𑄟	𑄔𑄳𑄦
𑄕 ṇ	𑄕𑄳𑄝	𑄕𑄳𑄟	𑄕𑄳𑄦
𑄖 t	𑄖𑄳𑄝	𑄖𑄳𑄟	𑄖𑄳𑄦
𑄗 th	𑄗𑄳𑄝	𑄗𑄳𑄟	𑄗𑄳𑄦
𑄘 d	𑄘𑄳𑄝	𑄘𑄳𑄟	𑄘𑄳𑄦
𑄙 dh	𑄙𑄳𑄝	𑄙𑄳𑄟	𑄙𑄳𑄦
𑄚 n	𑄚𑄳𑄝	𑄚𑄳𑄟	𑄚𑄳𑄦
𑄛 p	𑄛𑄳𑄝	𑄛𑄳𑄟	𑄛𑄳𑄦
𑄜 ph	𑄜𑄳𑄝	𑄜𑄳𑄟	𑄜𑄳𑄦
𑄝 b	𑄝𑄳𑄝	𑄝𑄳𑄟	𑄝𑄳𑄦
𑄞 bh	𑄞𑄳𑄝	𑄞𑄳𑄟	𑄞𑄳𑄦
𑄟 m	𑄟𑄳𑄝	𑄟𑄳𑄟	𑄟𑄳𑄦
𑄠 yy	𑄠𑄳𑄝	𑄠𑄳𑄟	𑄠𑄳𑄦
𑄡 y	𑄡𑄳𑄝	𑄡𑄳𑄟	𑄡𑄳𑄦
𑄢 r	𑄢𑄳𑄝	𑄢𑄳𑄟	𑄢𑄳𑄦
𑄤 w	𑄤𑄳𑄝	𑄤𑄳𑄟	𑄤𑄳𑄦
𑄥 s	𑄥𑄳𑄝	𑄥𑄳𑄟	𑄥𑄳𑄦
𑄦 h	𑄦𑄳𑄝	𑄦𑄳𑄟	𑄦𑄳𑄦

In the 1982 book Cāṅmār āg pudhi a much wider range of conjunct pairs is shown, some of them with fairly complicated glyphs:

Note: Spaces left blank do not have a combination
Consonant	𑄳𑄇: k	𑄳𑄉: g	𑄳𑄌: c	𑄳𑄍: ch	𑄳𑄎: j	𑄳𑄏: jh	𑄳𑄑: ṭ	𑄳𑄖: t	𑄳𑄗: th	𑄳𑄘: d	𑄳𑄙: dh	𑄳𑄛: p	𑄳𑄝: b	𑄳𑄟: m	𑄳𑄦: l
𑄇 k	𑄇𑄳𑄇		𑄇𑄳𑄌				𑄇𑄳𑄑	𑄇𑄳𑄖						𑄇𑄳𑄟	
𑄋 ṅ	𑄋𑄳𑄇	𑄋𑄳𑄉													
𑄌 c			𑄌𑄳𑄌	𑄌𑄳𑄍											
𑄎 j					𑄎𑄳𑄎										
𑄐 ñ			𑄐𑄳𑄌		𑄐𑄳𑄎	𑄐𑄳𑄏									
𑄑 ṭ							𑄑𑄳𑄑								
𑄖 t								𑄖𑄳𑄖	𑄖𑄳𑄗					𑄖𑄳𑄟	
𑄘 d										𑄘𑄳𑄘	𑄘𑄳𑄙				
𑄚 n								𑄚𑄳𑄖	𑄚𑄳𑄗					𑄚𑄳𑄟	
𑄛 p												𑄛𑄳𑄛			
𑄝 b													𑄝𑄳𑄝		
𑄟 m														𑄟𑄳𑄟	
𑄣 l	𑄦𑄳𑄇	𑄦𑄳𑄉		𑄦𑄳𑄍			𑄦𑄳𑄑					𑄦𑄳𑄛			𑄣𑄳𑄦
𑄥 s	𑄥𑄳𑄇						𑄥𑄳𑄑					𑄥𑄳𑄛		𑄥𑄳𑄟	
𑄦 h														𑄦𑄳𑄟	

== Letter names and punctuation ==
Chakma letters have a descriptive name followed by a traditional Brahmic consonant. These are given in annotations to the character names. Alongside a single (𑅁) and double (𑅂) danda punctuation, Chakma has a unique question mark (𑅃), and a section sign, Phulacihna. There is some variation in the glyphs for the Phulacihna (𑅀), some looking like flowers or leaves.

== Numerals ==
The Chakma script contains its own set of numerals.

0 (𑄶) (cinyo) [tʃʰinyœ]

1 (𑄷) 𑄃𑄬𑄇𑄴 / (ek) [æk]

2 (𑄸) 𑄘𑄪𑄃𑄨 / (dui) [d̪ui]

3 (𑄹) 𑄖𑄨𑄚𑄴 / (tin) [t̪in]

4 (𑄺) 𑄌𑄬𑄢𑄴 / (cer) [tʃʰer]

5 (𑄻) 𑄌𑄴𑄛 / (pac) [pʰatʃ]

6 (𑄼) 𑄍𑄧 / (cha) [tʃʰɔ]

7 (𑄽) 𑄖𑄴𑄥 / (sat) [tʃat̪]

8 (𑄾) 𑄃𑄖𑄴𑄖𑄮 / (atto) [ait̪t̪o]

9 (𑄿) 𑄚𑄧𑄂 / (na) [ñā]

10 (𑄷𑄶) 𑄘𑄧𑄌𑄴 / (dac) [dæç]

0 𑄶	1 𑄷	2 𑄸	3 𑄹	4 𑄺	5 𑄻	6 𑄼	7 𑄽	8 𑄾	9 𑄿

== Unicode ==
Chakma script was added to the Unicode Standard in January 2012 with the release of version 6.1.

The Unicode block for Chakma script is U+11100–U+1114F. Grey areas indicate non-assigned code points:

Chakma^{[1]}^{[2]} Official Unicode Consortium code chart (PDF)
	0	1	2	3	4	5	6	7	8	9	A	B	C	D	E	F
U+1110x	𑄀	𑄁	𑄂	𑄃	𑄄	𑄅	𑄆	𑄇	𑄈	𑄉	𑄊	𑄋	𑄌	𑄍	𑄎	𑄏
U+1111x	𑄐	𑄑	𑄒	𑄓	𑄔	𑄕	𑄖	𑄗	𑄘	𑄙	𑄚	𑄛	𑄜	𑄝	𑄞	𑄟
U+1112x	𑄠	𑄡	𑄢	𑄣	𑄤	𑄥	𑄦	𑄧	𑄨	𑄩	𑄪	𑄫	𑄬	𑄭	𑄮	𑄯
U+1113x	𑄰	𑄱	𑄲	𑄳	𑄴		𑄶	𑄷	𑄸	𑄹	𑄺	𑄻	𑄼	𑄽	𑄾	𑄿
U+1114x	𑅀	𑅁	𑅂	𑅃	𑅄	𑅅	𑅆	𑅇								
Notes 1.As of Unicode version 18.0 2.Grey areas indicate non-assigned code points

== Educational Institutions ==
The Chakma language is taught in numerous government and private schools across India (in Tripura, Mizoram and Arunachal Pradesh) and Bangladesh. In 2004, the Government of Tripura's Directorate of Kokborok & Other Minority Languages officially introduced Chakma in primary schools using the Bengali script. Since 2013, it has been taught using the Chakma script. Currently, 87 schools offer Chakma language instruction.
