= Kengrachhari Union =

Union of Rangamati District, Chittagong, Bangladesh

Kengrachhari কেংড়াছড়ি
- Union
- Interactive map of Kengrachhari
- Country: Bangladesh
- Division: Chittagong Division
- District: Rangamati District
- Upazila: Belaichhari Upazila

Area
  - Total: 103.6 km^{2} (40.0 sq mi)

Population (2022)
  - Total: 5,897
  - Density: 56.92/km^{2} (147.4/sq mi)
- Time zone: UTC+6 (BST)
- Postal code: 4550
- Website: kengrachariup.rangamati.gov.bd

Kengrachhari Union is a union of Belaichhari Upazila under Rangamati District.

== Demography ==
According to 2022 census, total population of the Union are 5,897. Among them, 1,372 are Muslim, 4,514 are Buddhist and 11 follow others religion.

Religion-2022
1. Buddhism 85.51 (78.2%)
2. Islam 23.64 (21.6%)
3. Others 0.18 (0.16%)

== Ethnicity ==
This Union is home to a variety of different ethnic groups. Among them, 1,445 are Bengali, 3,459 are Chakma, 592 are Marma, 400 are Tanchangya and 1 are of others ethnic groups.

Ethnicity-2022
1. Chakma (58.7%)
2. Bengali (24.5%)
3. Marma (10.0%)
4. Tanchangya (6.78%)
5. Others (0.02%)
