= Maidang Union =

Union of Rangamati District, Chittagong, Bangladesh

Maidang মৈদং
- Union
- Interactive map of Maidang
- Country: Bangladesh
- Division: Chittagong Division
- District: Rangamati District
- Upazila: Jurachhari Upazila

Area
  - Total: 155.4 km^{2} (60.0 sq mi)

Population (2022)
  - Total: 4,601
  - Density: 29.61/km^{2} (76.68/sq mi)
- Time zone: UTC+6 (BST)
- Postal code: 4560
- Website: moidongup.rangamati.gov.bd

Maidang Union is a union of Juraichhari Upazila under Rangamati District.

== Demography ==
According to 2022 census, total population of the Union are 4,601. Among them, 111 are Muslim, 4,486 are Buddhist and 4 follow others religion.

Religion-2022
1. Buddhism (97.5%)
2. Islam (2.41%)
3. Others (0.09%)

== Ethnicity ==
This Union is home to a variety of different ethnic groups. Among them, 128 are Bengali, 4,164 are Chakma, 287 are Tanchangya, 20 are Marma and 2 are of others ethnic groups.

Ethnicity-2022
1. Chakma (90.5%)
2. Tanchangya (6.24%)
3. Bengali (2.78%)
4. Marma (0.43%)
5. Others (0.04%)
