= Jibtali Union =

Union of Rangamati District, Chittagong, Bangladesh

Jibtali জীবতলী
- Union
- Interactive map of Jibtali
- Country: Bangladesh
- Division: Chittagong Division
- District: Rangamati District
- Upazila: Rangamati Sadar Upazila

Area
  - Total: 54.39 km^{2} (21.00 sq mi)

Population (2022)
  - Total: 4,452
  - Density: 81.85/km^{2} (212.0/sq mi)
- Time zone: UTC+6 (BST)
- Postal code: 4500
- Website: jibtaliup.rangamati.gov.bd

Jibtali Union is a union of Rangamati Sadar Upazila under Rangamati District.

== Demography ==
According to 2022 census, total population of the Union are 4,452. Among them, 1,524 are Muslim, 2,805 are Buddhist, 122 are Hindu and 1 are Christian.

Religion-2022
1. Buddhism (63.0%)
2. Islam (34.2%)
3. Hinduism (2.74%)
4. Christianity (0.02%)
5. Others (0.00%)

== Ethnicity ==
This Union is home to a variety of different ethnic groups. Among them, 1,706 are Bengali, 1,961 are Chakma, 535 are Marma and 250 are Tanchangya.

Ethnicity-2022
1. Chakma (44.0%)
2. Bengali (38.3%)
3. Marma (12.0%)
4. Tanchangya (5.61%)
5. Others (0.00%)
