= Chakma (Unicode block) =

- Range: U+11100..U+1114F (80 code points)
- Plane: SMP
- Scripts: Chakma
- Major alphabets: Chakma
- Assigned: 71 code points
- Unused: 9 reserved code points

Unicode version history
- 6.1 (2012): 67 (+67)
- 11.0 (2018): 70 (+3)
- 13.0 (2020): 71 (+1)

Unicode documentation
- Code chart ∣ Web page

Chakma is a Unicode block containing characters for writing the Chakma language of Bangladesh and eastern India.

Chakma^{[1]}^{[2]} Official Unicode Consortium code chart (PDF)
	0	1	2	3	4	5	6	7	8	9	A	B	C	D	E	F
U+1110x	𑄀	𑄁	𑄂	𑄃	𑄄	𑄅	𑄆	𑄇	𑄈	𑄉	𑄊	𑄋	𑄌	𑄍	𑄎	𑄏
U+1111x	𑄐	𑄑	𑄒	𑄓	𑄔	𑄕	𑄖	𑄗	𑄘	𑄙	𑄚	𑄛	𑄜	𑄝	𑄞	𑄟
U+1112x	𑄠	𑄡	𑄢	𑄣	𑄤	𑄥	𑄦	𑄧	𑄨	𑄩	𑄪	𑄫	𑄬	𑄭	𑄮	𑄯
U+1113x	𑄰	𑄱	𑄲	𑄳	𑄴		𑄶	𑄷	𑄸	𑄹	𑄺	𑄻	𑄼	𑄽	𑄾	𑄿
U+1114x	𑅀	𑅁	𑅂	𑅃	𑅄	𑅅	𑅆	𑅇								
Notes: 1. As of Unicode version 16.0; 2. Grey areas indicate non-assigned code points

== History ==
The following Unicode-related documents record the purpose and process of defining specific characters in the Chakma block:

Version	Final code points (Note: Proposed code points and characters names may differ from final code points and names)	Count	L2 ID	WG2 ID	Document
6.1	U+11100..11134, 11136..11143	67	L2/08-133	N3428	Everson, Michael (2008-04-08), Preliminary proposal for encoding the Chakma script in the UCS
6.1	U+11100..11134, 11136..11143	67	L2/09-187R	N3645R	Everson, Michael; Hosken, Martin (2009-07-28), Proposal for encoding the Chakma script in the UCS
6.1	U+11100..11134, 11136..11143	67	L2/09-225R		Moore, Lisa (2009-08-17), "C.12", UTC #120 / L2 #217 Minutes
6.1	U+11100..11134, 11136..11143	67		N3703 (pdf, doc)	Umamaheswaran, V. S. (2010-04-13), "M55.26", Unconfirmed minutes of WG 2 meeting no. 55, Tokyo 2009-10-26/30
11.0	U+11144..11146	3	L2/16-330	N4802	Chakma, Bivuti; Glass, Andrew (2016-11-02), Proposal to encode CHAKMA LETTER LHAA, DEPENDENT VOWEL SIGNS AA & EI for Chakma
11.0	U+11144..11146	3	L2/16-342		Anderson, Deborah; Whistler, Ken; Pournader, Roozbeh; Glass, Andrew; Iancu, Laurențiu (2016-11-07), "5.B Chakma", Recommendations to UTC #149 November 2016 on Script Proposals
11.0	U+11144..11146	3	L2/16-325		Moore, Lisa (2016-11-18), "D.13", UTC #149 Minutes
13.0	U+11147	1	L2/19-143	N5055	Scheuren, Zachary (2019-04-22), Proposal to encode CHAKMA LETTER VAA for Pali
13.0	U+11147	1	L2/19-173		Anderson, Deborah; et al. (2019-04-29), "11. Chakma", Recommendations to UTC #159 April-May 2019 on Script Proposals
13.0	U+11147	1	L2/19-122		Moore, Lisa (2019-05-08), "D.5", UTC #159 Minutes
13.0	U+11147	1		N5122	"M68.10", Unconfirmed minutes of WG 2 meeting 68, 2019-12-31
