= Balukhali =

Balukhali may refer to:

- Balukhali Union, an union of Rangamati District
- Balukhali refugee camp, a Rohingya camp in Bangladesh
