= Belaichhari Upazila =

Belaichari বিলাইছড়ি
- Upazila
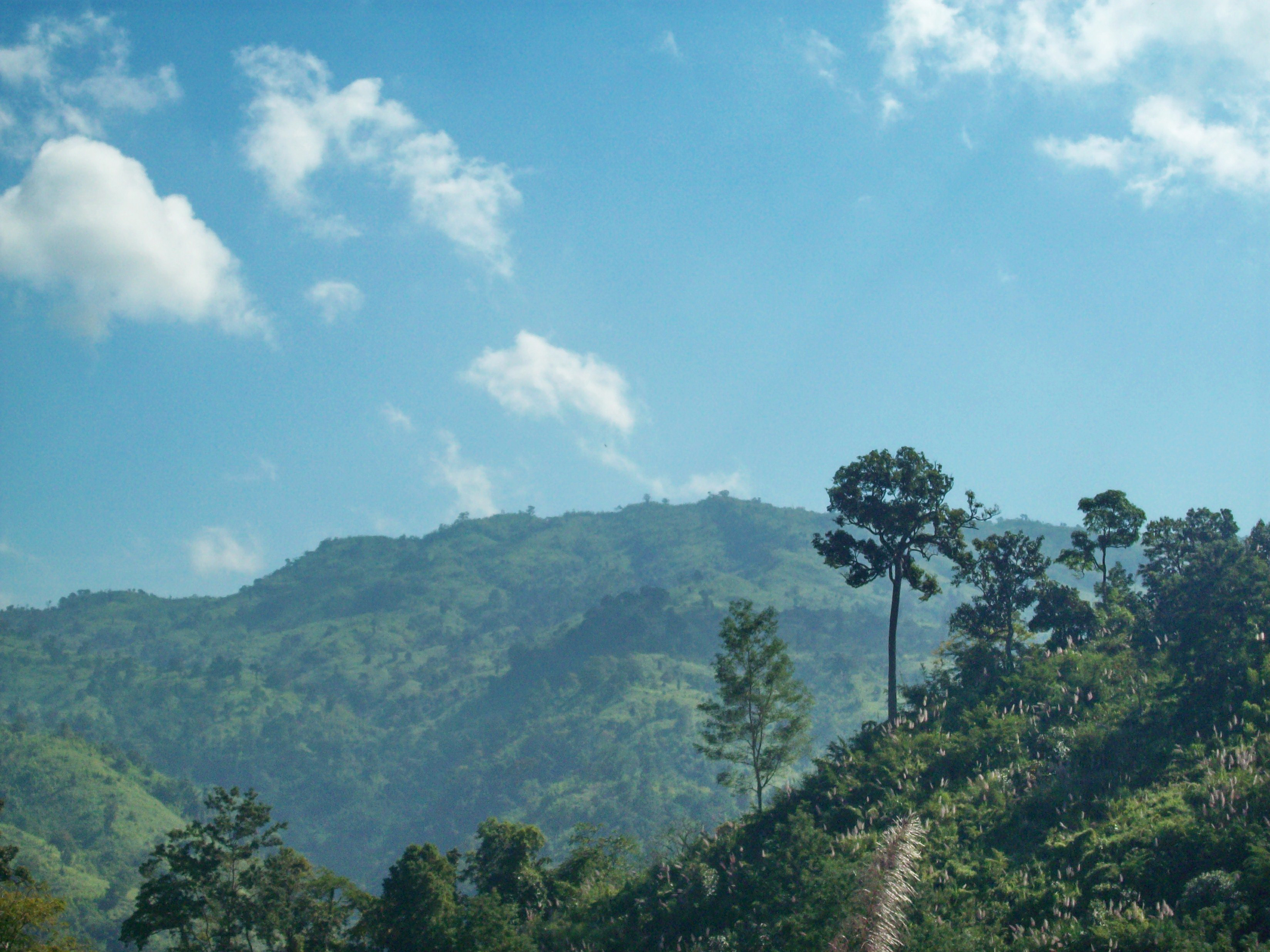
- Maithaijama Haphong

- Coordinates: 22°28′N 92°22.5′E
- Country: Bangladesh
- Division: Chittagong
- District: Rangamati

Area
  - Total: 745.91 km^{2} (288.00 sq mi)

Population (2022)
  - Total: 29,540
  - Density: 39.60/km^{2} (102.6/sq mi)
- Time zone: UTC+6 (BST)
- Postal code: 4550
- Website: Official Map of Belaichhari

Belaichhari Upazila mauza geocode map

Belaichhari (Bengali: বিলাইছড়ি) is an upazila of Rangamati District in the division of Chittagong, Bangladesh.

== Geography ==
Belaichari is located at 22.4667°N 92.3750°E. It has a total area 745.91 km^{2}. Belaichhari is bordered by Rangamati Sadar upazila to the north, Kaptai and Rajasthali upazilas to the west, Bandarban district to the south, and Juraichhari upazila, the Indian state of Mizoram and Chin State of Myanmar to the east.

== Demographics ==
According to the 2022 Bangladeshi census, Belaichhari Upazila had 7,369 households and a population of 29,540. 8.67% of the population were under 5 years of age. Belaichhari had a literacy rate (age 7 and over) of 55.88%: 66.74% for males and 43.69% for females, and a sex ratio of 111.05 males for every 100 females. 20,919 (70.82%) lived in urban areas.

=== Ethnicity and religion ===
Religions in Belaichhari Upazila (2022)
Religion	Percent
Buddhism	78.21%
Islam	10.62%
Christianity	9.60%
Hinduism	1.24%
Other or not stated	0.32%

Population by religion in Union
Union	Muslim	Buddhist	Christian	Hindu	Others
Barathali	336	1,731	1,422	11	95
Belaichhari	926	7,124	369	244	0
Farua	503	9,735	1,045	102	0
Kengrachhari	1,362	4,514	1	10	0

🟨 Buddhist majority

As of the 2022 Bangladeshi census, Belaichhari upazila had a population of 29,540. The ethnic population was 24,852 (84.13%), of which Tanchangya were 11,452, Chakma 7,882, Marma 2,650, Tripura 1,796, Pankho 498 and Bom 356.

Ethnicity in the Belaichhari Upazila (2022)
1. Tanchangya (38.8%)
2. Chakma (26.7%)
3. Bengali (15.9%)
4. Marma (8.97%)
5. Tripura (6.08%)
6. Pankho (1.68%)
7. Bom (1.21%)
8. Others (0.74%)

Population by ethnicity in Union
Union	Bengali	Chakma	Tonchonga	Marma	Others
Barathali	582	6	1,087	490	1,430
Belaichhari	1,335	3,434	2,949	556	389
Farua	1,326	983	7,016	1,012	1,048
Kengrachhari	1,445	3,459	400	592	1

🟨 Chakma majority 🟪 Tonchonga majority 🟥 Others majority

== Administration ==
UNO: Jamshed Alam Rana.

Belaichari Upazila is divided into four union parishads: Barathali, Belaichhari, Farua, and Kengrachhari. The union parishads are subdivided into 9 mauzas and 59 villages.

== See also ==
- Upazilas of Bangladesh
- Districts of Bangladesh
- Divisions of Bangladesh
