= Juraichhari Upazila =

Juraichhari জুরাছড়ি
- Upazila
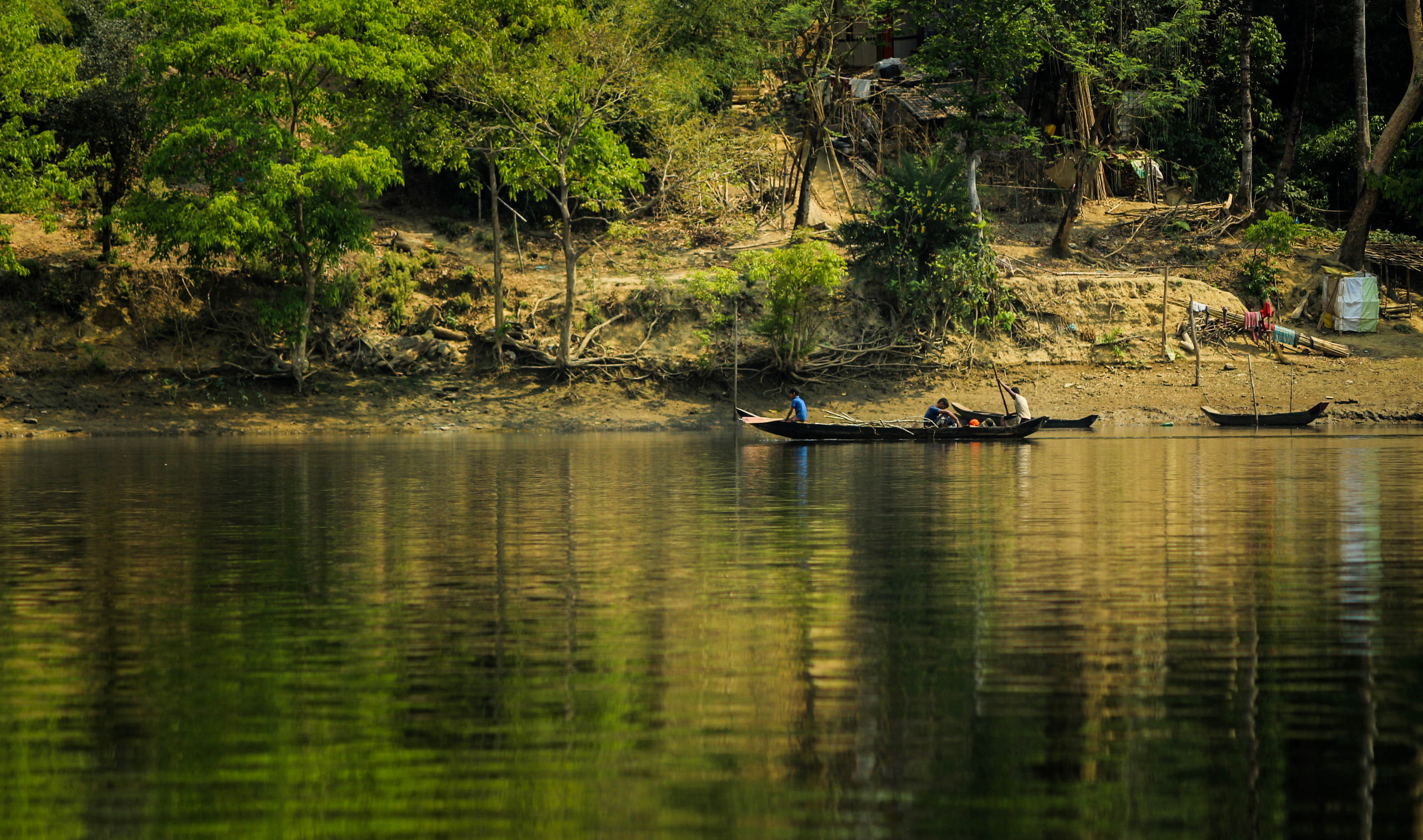
- Kaptai Lake, Juraichhari

- Coordinates: 22°40′N 92°23′E
- Country: Bangladesh
- Division: Chittagong
- District: Rangamati

Area
  - Total: 606.05 km^{2} (234.00 sq mi)

Population (2022)
  - Total: 26,932
  - Density: 44.439/km^{2} (115.10/sq mi)
- Time zone: UTC+6 (BST)
- Postal code: 4560
- Website: Official Map of Juraichhari

Juraichhari (Bengali: জুরাছড়ি) is an upazila of Rangamati District in the Division of Chittagong, Bangladesh.

== Geography ==
Juraichhari is located at 22.6667°N 92.3833°E. It has 6,136 households and total area 606.05 km^{2}. Juraichhari is bordered by Barkal upazila to the north, Rangamati Sadar and Belaichhari upazilas to the west and the Indian state of Mizoram to the east.

== Demographics ==
According to the 2022 Bangladeshi census, Jurachhari Upazila had 6,510 households and a population of 26,932. 8.50% of the population were under 5 years of age. Jurachhari had a literacy rate (age 7 and over) of 61.17%: 72.20% for males and 48.81% for females, and a sex ratio of 111.48 males for every 100 females. 9,418 (34.97%) lived in urban areas.

=== Ethnicity and religion ===
Religions in Juraichhari Upazila (2022)
Religion	Percent
Buddhism	95.6%
Islam	3.26%
Hinduism	0.63%
Christianity	0.52%
Other or not stated	0.00%

Population by religion in Union
Union	Muslim	Buddhist	Others
Bonjogichhara	251	5,011	35
Dumdumya	164	7,351	150
Juraichhari	351	8,899	119
Maidang	111	4,486	4

🟨 Buddhist majority

As of the 2022 Bangladeshi census, Juraichhari upazila had a population of 26,932. The ethnic population was 25,681 (95.35%), of which Chakma were 24,548 and Tanchangya 898.

Ethnicity in the Juraichhari Upazila (2022)
1. Chakma (91.2%)
2. Bengali (4.65%)
3. Tanchangya (3.33%)
4. Others (0.87%)

Population by ethnicity in Union
Union	Bengali	Chakma	Tonchonga	Others
Bonjogichhara	326	4,945	4	22
Dumdumya	234	6,678	594	159
Juraichhari	563	8,761	13	32
Maidang	128	4,164	287	22

🟨 Chakma majority

== Administration ==
UNO: Arafat Mohammad Noman.

Juraichhari Upazila is divided into four union parishads: Bonjogichhara, Dumdumya, Juraichhari, and Maidang. The union parishads are subdivided into 11 mauzas and 105 villages.

== See also ==
- Upazilas of Bangladesh
- Districts of Bangladesh
- Divisions of Bangladesh
