= Belaichhari Union =

Union of Rangamati District, Chittagong, Bangladesh

Belaichhari বিলাইছড়ি
- Union
- Interactive map of Belaichhari
- Country: Bangladesh
- Division: Chittagong Division
- District: Rangamati District
- Upazila: Belaichhari Upazila

Area
  - Total: 85.47 km^{2} (33.00 sq mi)

Population (2022)
  - Total: 8,391
  - Density: 98.17/km^{2} (254.3/sq mi)
- Time zone: UTC+6 (BST)
- Postal code: 4550
- Website: belaichariup.rangamati.gov.bd

Belaichhari Union is a union of Belaichhari Upazila under Rangamati District.

== Demography ==
According to 2022 census, total population of the Union are 8,663. Among them, 926 are Muslim, 7,124 are Buddhist, 369 are Christian and 244 are Hindu.

Religion-2022
1. Buddhism (82.2%)
2. Islam (10.7%)
3. Christianity (4.26%)
4. Hinduism (2.82%)
5. Others (0.00%)

== Ethnicity ==
This Union is home to a variety of different ethnic groups. Among them, 1,335 are Bengali, 3,434 are Chakma, 2,949 are Tanchangya, 556 are Marma and 389 are of others ethnic groups.

Ethnicity-2022
1. Chakma (39.6%)
2. Tanchangya (34.0%)
3. Bengali (15.4%)
4. Marma (6.42%)
5. Tripura and Others (4.49%)
