= Balukhali Union =

Union of Rangamati District, Chittagong, Bangladesh

Balukhali বালুখালী
- Union
- Interactive map of Balukhali
- Country: Bangladesh
- Division: Chittagong Division
- District: Rangamati District
- Upazila: Rangamati Sadar Upazila

Area
  - Total: 176.12 km^{2} (68.00 sq mi)

Population (2022)
  - Total: 7,963
  - Density: 45.21/km^{2} (117.1/sq mi)
- Time zone: UTC+6 (BST)
- Postal code: 4500
- Website: balukhaliup.rangamati.gov.bd

Balukhali Union is a union of Rangamati Sadar Upazila under Rangamati District.

== Demography ==
According to 2022 census, total population of the Union are 7,963. Among them, 512 are Muslim, 6,422 are Buddhist, 512 are Hindu and 113 are Christian.

Religion-2022
1. Buddhism (80.7%)
2. Hinduism (11.5%)
3. Islam (6.43%)
4. Christianity (1.42%)
5. Others (0.00%)

== Ethnicity ==
This Union is home to a variety of different ethnic groups. Among them, 598 are Bengali, 5,684 are Chakma, 522 are Tanchangya, 138 are Marma and 1,021 are of others ethnic groups.

Ethnicity-2022
1. Chakma (71.4%)
2. Bengali (7.51%)
3. Tanchangya (6.56%)
4. Marma (1.73%)
5. Others (12.8%)
