= Bandukbhanga Union =

Union of Rangamati District, Chittagong, Bangladesh

Bandukbhanga বন্দুকভাঙ্গা
- Union
- Interactive map of Bandukbhanga
- Country: Bangladesh
- Division: Chittagong Division
- District: Rangamati District
- Upazila: Rangamati Sadar Upazila

Area
  - Total: 82.88 km^{2} (32.00 sq mi)

Population (2022)
  - Total: 7,160
  - Density: 86.4/km^{2} (224/sq mi)
- Time zone: UTC+6 (BST)
- Postal code: 4500
- Website: bandukbhangaup.rangamati.gov.bd

Bandukbhanga Union is a union of Rangamati Sadar Upazila under Rangamati District.

== Demography ==
According to 2022 census, total population of the Union are 7,160. Among them, 31 are Muslim, 7,118 are Buddhist, 10 are Hindu and 1 are Christian.

Religion-2022
1. Buddhism (99.4%)
2. Islam (0.43%)
3. Hinduism (0.14%)
4. Christianity (0.01%)
5. Others (0.00%)

== Ethnicity ==
This Union is home to a variety of different ethnic groups. Among them, 93 are Bengali, 7,043 are Chakma and 24 are of others ethnic groups.

Ethnicity-2022
1. Chakma (98.4%)
2. Bengali (1.30%)
3. Others (0.33%)
