= Bonjogichhara Union =

Union of Rangamati District, Chittagong, Bangladesh

Banjogichhara বনযোগীছড়া
- Union
- Interactive map of Banjogichhara
- Country: Bangladesh
- Division: Chittagong Division
- District: Rangamati District
- Upazila: Jurachhari Upazila

Area
  - Total: 41.44 km^{2} (16.00 sq mi)

Population (2022)
  - Total: 5,297
  - Density: 127.8/km^{2} (331.1/sq mi)
- Time zone: UTC+6 (BST)
- Postal code: 4560
- Website: banajogicharaup.rangamati.gov.bd

Bonjogichhara Union is a union of Juraichhari Upazila under Rangamati District.

== Demography ==
According to 2022 census, total population of the Union are 5,297. Among them, 251 are Muslim, 5,011 are Buddhist, 28 are Hindu and 7 are Christian.

Religion-2022
1. Buddhism (94.6%)
2. Islam (4.74%)
3. Hinduism (0.53%)
4. Christianity (0.13%)
5. Others (0.00%)

== Ethnicity ==
This Union is home to a variety of different ethnic groups. Among them, 326 are Bengali, 4,945 are Chakma and 26 are of others ethnic groups.

Ethnicity-2022
1. Chakma (93.3%)
2. Bengali (6.15%)
3. Others (0.50%)
