= Sapchhari Union =

Union of Rangamati District, Chittagong, Bangladesh

Sapchhari সাপছড়ি
- Union
- Interactive map of Sapchhari
- Country: Bangladesh
- Division: Chittagong Division
- District: Rangamati District
- Upazila: Rangamati Sadar Upazila

Area
  - Total: 38.85 km^{2} (15.00 sq mi)

Population (2022)
  - Total: 6,812
  - Density: 175.3/km^{2} (454.1/sq mi)
- Time zone: UTC+6 (BST)
- Postal code: 4500
- Website: sapchariup.rangamati.gov.bd

Sapchhari Union is a union of Rangamati Sadar Upazila under Rangamati District.

== Demography ==
According to 2022 census, total population of the Union are 6,812. Among them, 1,608 are Muslim, 5,090 are Buddhist, 73 are Hindu and 41 are Christian.

Religion-2022
1. Buddhism (74.7%)
2. Islam (23.6%)
3. Hinduism (1.07%)
4. Christianity (0.60%)
5. Others (0.00%)

== Ethnicity ==
This Union is home to a variety of different ethnic groups. Among them, 1,696 are Bengali, 5,030 are Chakma and 86 are of others ethnic groups.

Ethnicity-2022
1. Chakma (73.8%)
2. Bengali (24.9%)
3. Others (1.26%)
