= Debotakhum =

Tourist attraction in Bandarban, Bangladesh

Debotakhum (Bengali: দেবতাখুম) is a natural water-filled hollow located in Rowangchhari Upazila of Bandarban District, Bangladesh. It is situated in a hilly forested area.

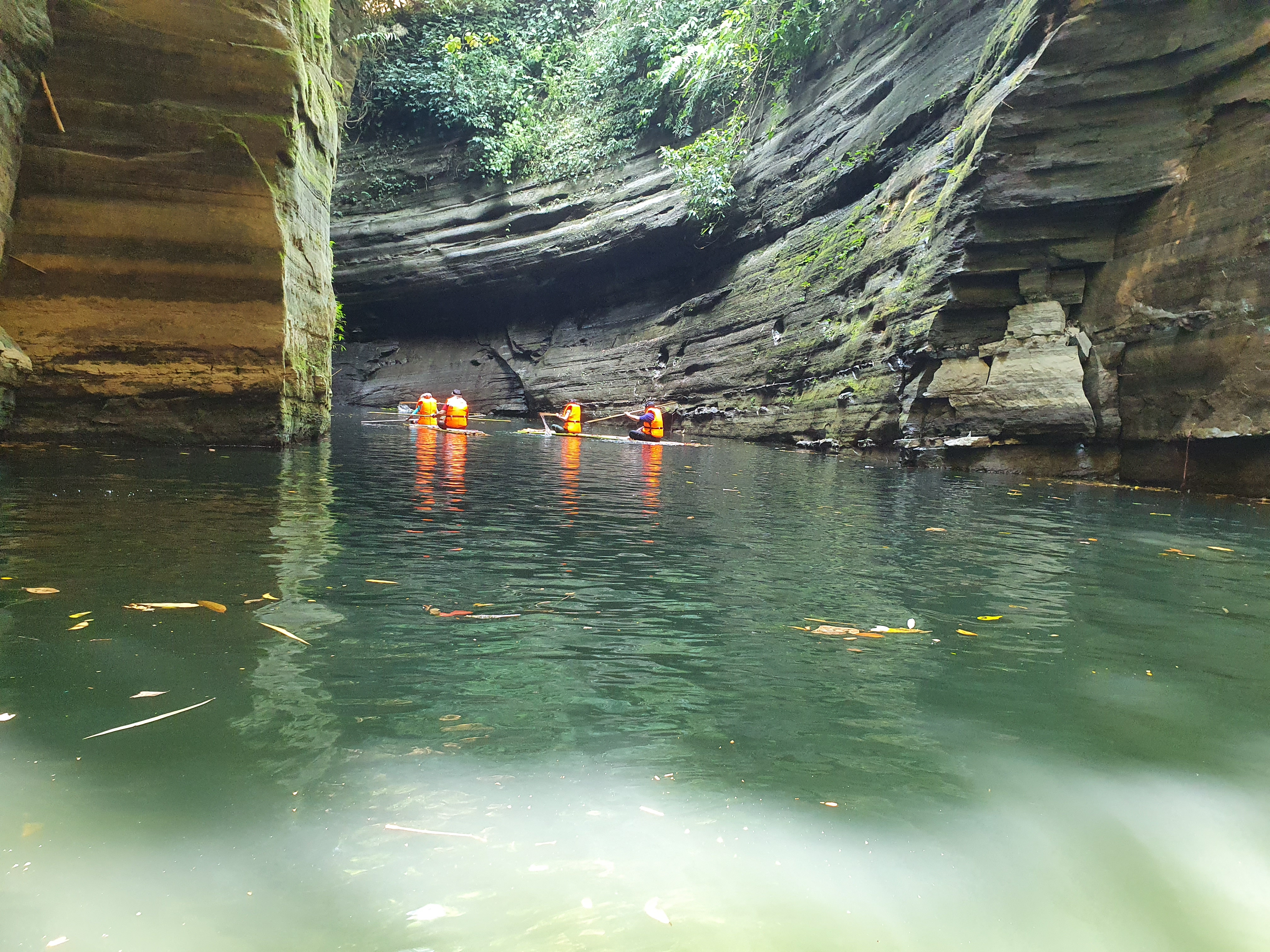
Debotakhum natural place

The water hollows are approximately 50 to 70 feet deep, and as roughly 600 feet long.

== Etymology ==
In the local (Marma regional) usage, the word "khum" refers to a natural waterfall or deep pool. According to myths, an elderly Marma man once spotted an enormous turtle in this reservoir. Its unusual size led him to believe that a debota (the Bengali word for “god”) was residing in the khum, disguised as a turtle. Even today, the villagers maintain the belief that their deity dwells somewhere in the area.

The name "Debotakhum" although originates from the Bengali word "debota" (meaning "deity" or "god") combined with "khum". According to local traditions, the name reflects a belief or story about a creature in the khum, though no formal shrine or statue is present.

It is also referred to as "Sonakhum" and "Thongchikhum" by the locals.

== Tourism ==
Debotakhum is known as one of Bandarban's popular adventure and natural‑beauty tourist spots.

The site attracts around 400–500 visitors per day during peak season, dropping to 150–200 in the off-season. During holiday surges, nearly 600–700 visitors arrive to the site.

The khum is surrounded by thick forest and hills. The water is often described as very clear and cold. A bamboo‑raft ride (vela/ traditional raft/boat) on the pool is also present.

In June 2025, local authorities in Rowangchhari Upazila issued a temporary advisory/ban on travel to Debotakhum due heavy rainfall, increased water flow, and landslide risk. After weather conditions improved, tourists were allowed again.

== Gallery ==
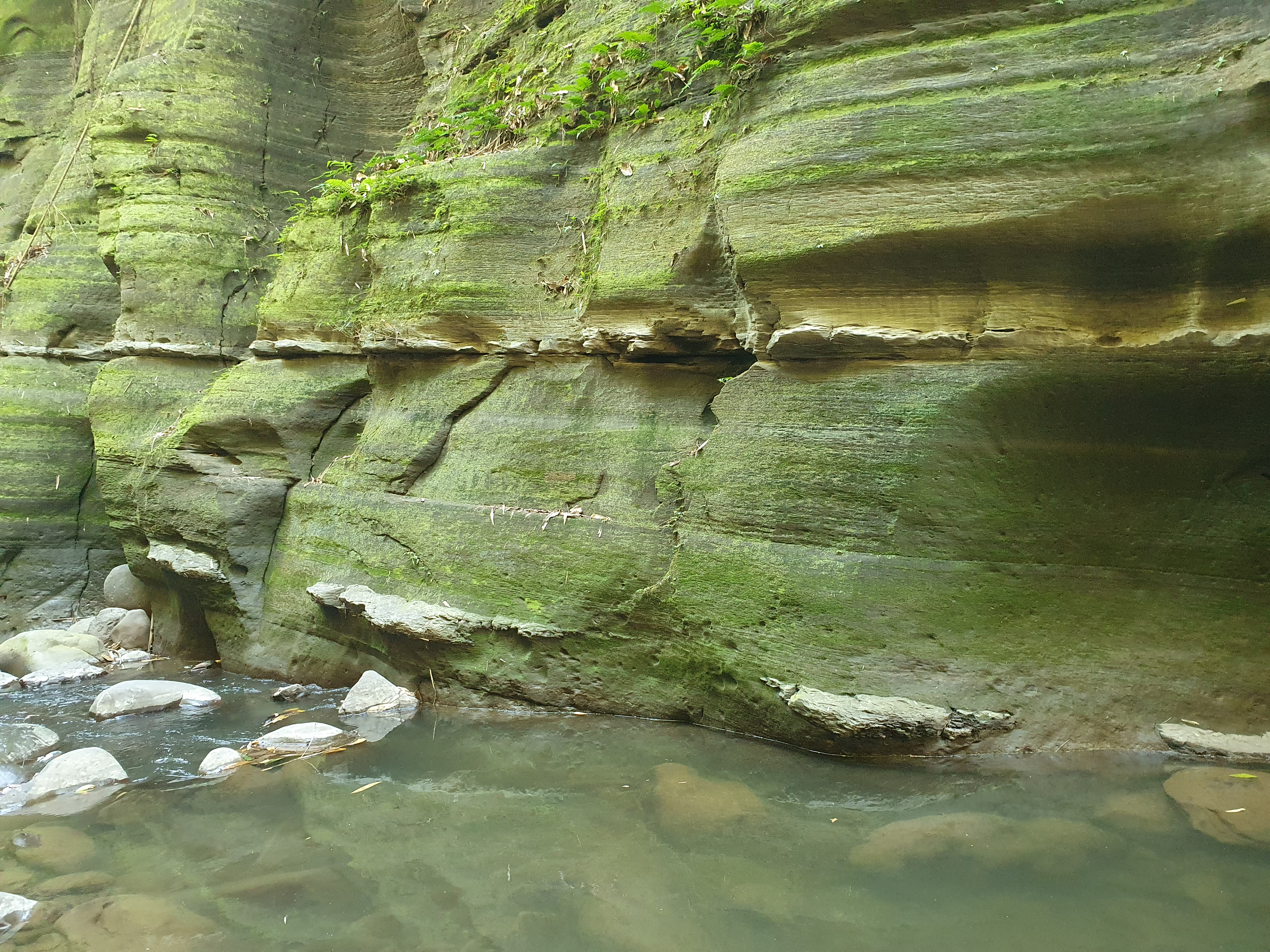

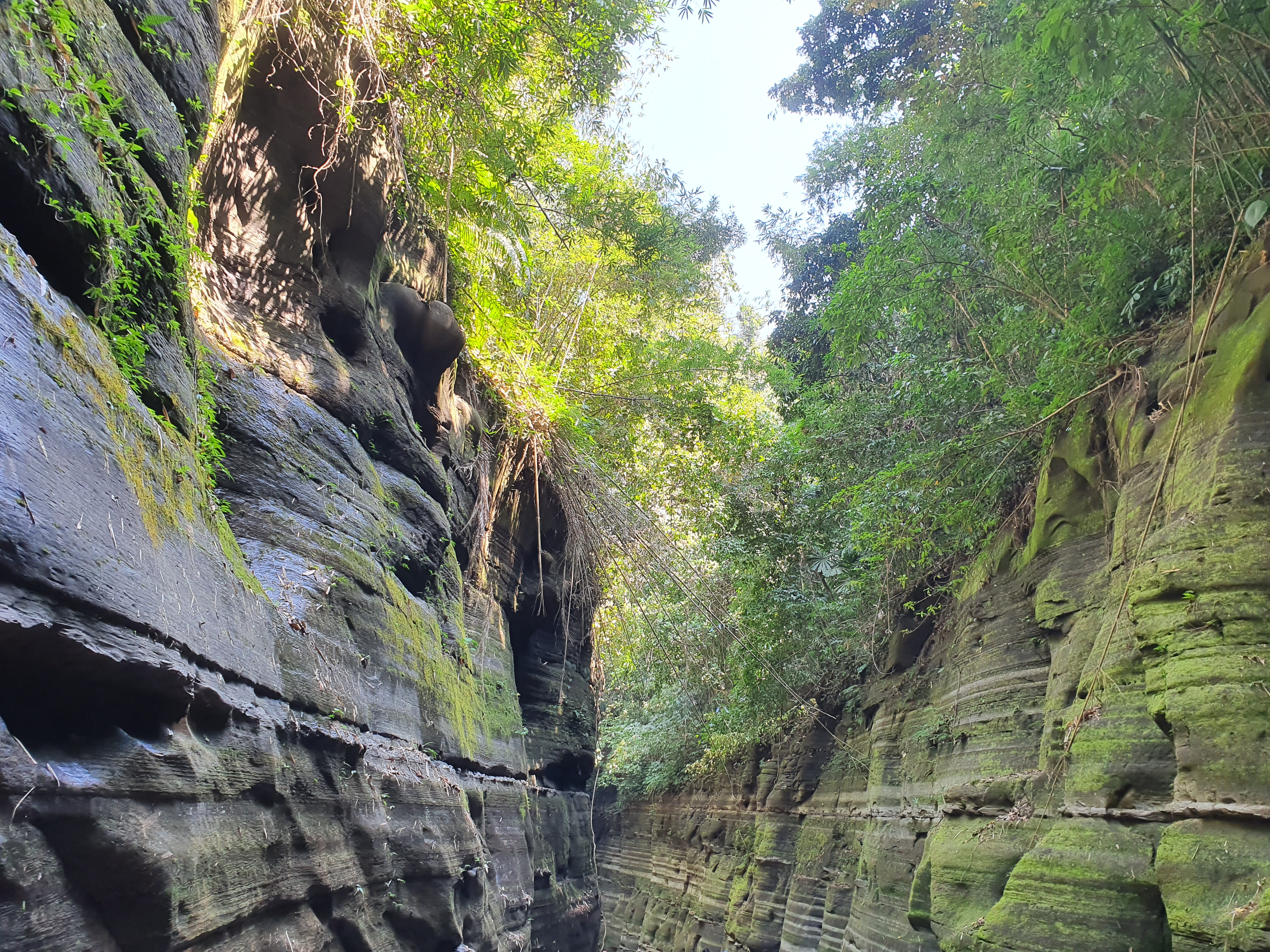

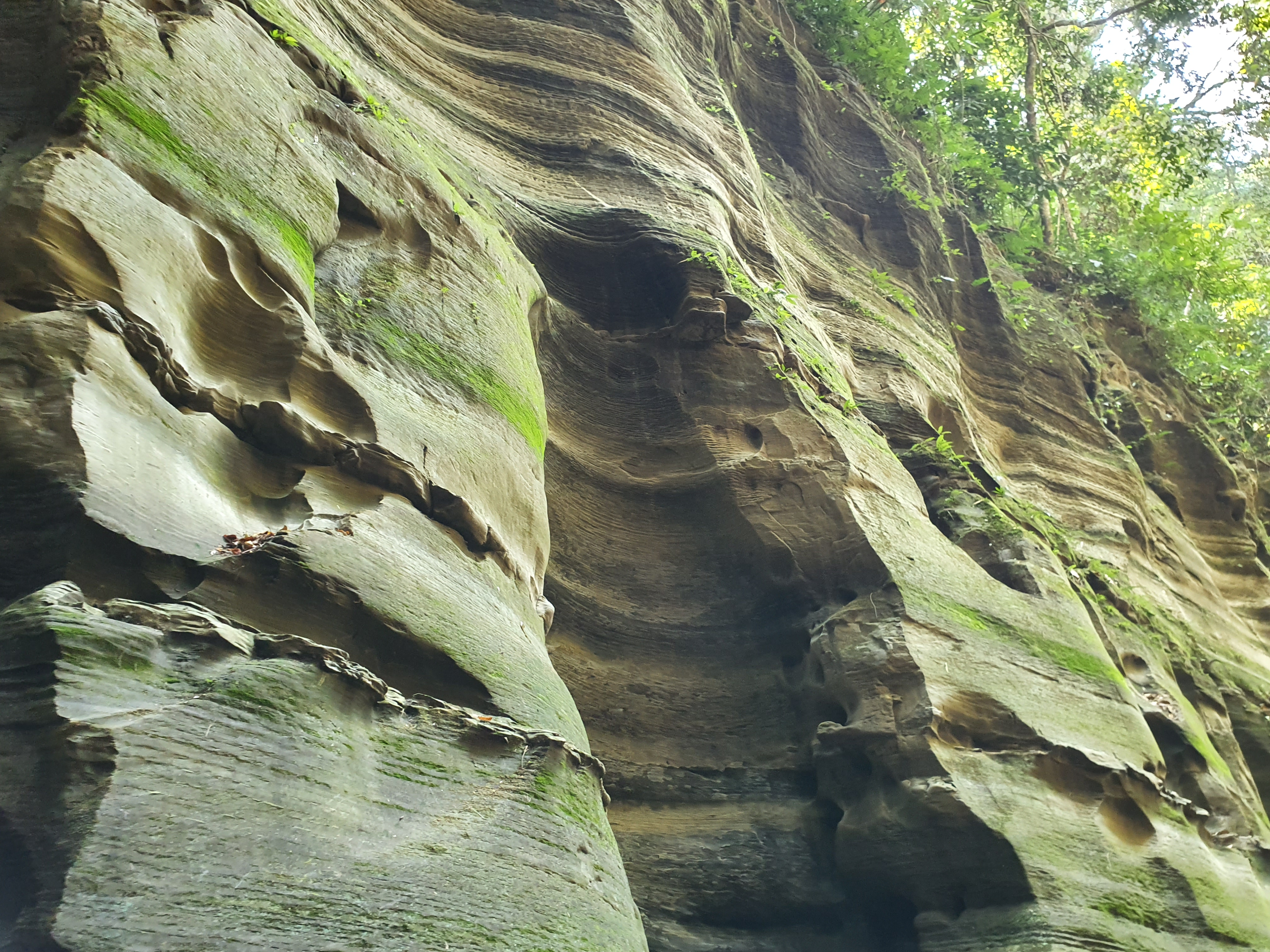

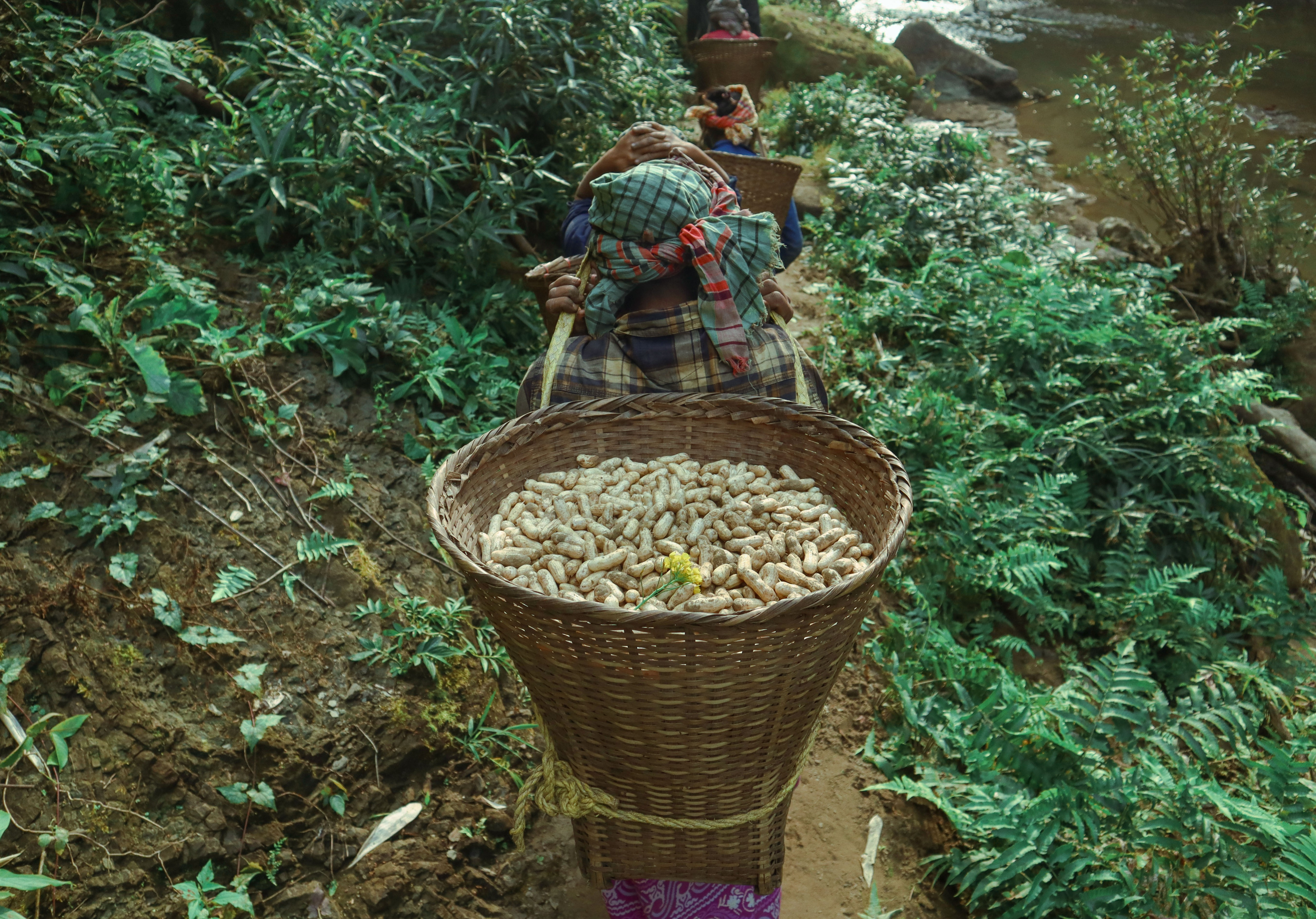

== See also ==
- Tourism in Bangladesh
- Chittagong Hill Tracts
- Sajek Valley
