= Kutukchhari Union =

Union of Rangamati District, Chittagong, Bangladesh

Kutukchhari কুতুকছড়ি
- Union
- Interactive map of Kutukchhari
- Country: Bangladesh
- Division: Chittagong Division
- District: Rangamati District
- Upazila: Rangamati Sadar Upazila

Area
  - Total: 46.62 km^{2} (18.00 sq mi)

Population (2022)
  - Total: 6,850
  - Density: 147/km^{2} (381/sq mi)
- Time zone: UTC+6 (BST)
- Postal code: 4500
- Website: kutukchariup.rangamati.gov.bd

Kutukchhari Union is a union of Rangamati Sadar Upazila under Rangamati District.

== Demography ==
According to 2022 census, total population of the Union are 6,650. Among them, 128 are Muslim, 6,389 are Buddhist, 108 are Hindu and 25 are Christian.

Religion-2022
1. Buddhism (96.1%)
2. Islam (1.92%)
3. Hinduism (1.62%)
4. Christianity (0.38%)
5. Others (0.00%)

== Ethnicity ==
This Union is home to a variety of different ethnic groups. Among them, 279 are Bengali, 6,310 are Chakma and 61 are of others ethnic groups.

Ethnicity-2022
1. Chakma (94.9%)
2. Bengali (4.20%)
3. Others (0.91%)
