= Daingnet people =

Ethnic group in Myanmar

Daingnet
ဒိုင်းနက်
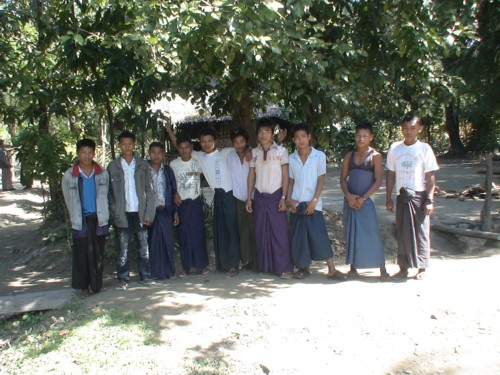
- Daignet men in Rakhine State of Myanmar

Total population
- 80,000 (est.)

Regions with significant populations
- Myanmar (Rakhine State)

Languages
- Chakma · Burmese

Religion
- Theravada Buddhism

Related ethnic groups
- Chakmas, Burmans, Rakhines, Marma

The Daingnet people (Burmese: ဒိုင်းနက်လူမျိုး), also known as the Chakma people (Burmese: သက္ကမ) are an ethnic group indigenous to northern Rakhine State, Myanmar. According to their own internal census in 1995 they numbered about 60,000. In 2011, the number was estimated to be around 80,000. From appearance they are indistinguishable from the Rakhine people; however, the Daingnet people have a distinct language and culture. Ethnically, they are closely related to the Chakma people of Bangladesh and Northeast India. The languages of the Daingnet and Chakma people are mutually intelligible. Daingnet people are one of 135 ethnic groups officially recognized by the Myanmar government as indigenous to Myanmar. Daingnets are one of the Tibeto-Burman tribes. Genetically, they are closely related to the Tibetans, Burmans and Rakhines.

== Etymology ==
Daingnets do not call themselves Daingnet; instead, they call themselves Thaikhma like the nearby Chakma people of Bangladesh and Northeast India. They have a similar language to Tanchangya (Daingya Gosha – Sub group of Tanchangya). The term "Daingnet" is an exonym originally used by Rakhine people. In Rakhine language, Daingnet means "shield warriors" or "armored warriors". Centuries ago, the Rakhine kings hired the Daingnets as soldiers and they showed their mastery with shield and sword. The Daingnets no longer fight with shield and sword, but the name Daingnet stuck.

== History ==
Daingnets are indigenous to Rakhine State. They were among the first people who settled in northern Rakhine State. During British rule in Burma, the Daingnets were classified as Sak people. Sak is a generic term used by the Bamar and Rakhine peoples to denote the Chakma people.

In the spring of 1798, British explorer Francis Buchanan visited Chittagong Hill Tracts, he asked a Chakma man if they were the same as Sak people in Rakhine State. The man replied, the Saks of Rakhine State were Moishang Saks. In the Rakhine language Moishang means primary or superior. What the man meant was that the Saks of Rakhine State retained the original Chakma language. Though Francis Buchanan did not visit Rakhine State he was aware of the Sak people from his earlier visit to Cox's Bazar. He might have heard about them from the East India Company officials or the Rakhine refugees who were pouring into Cox's Bazar to flee Burma-Rakhine conflict.

According to Burmese historian Gordon Luce, the Saks (i.e. ancestors of the Daingnets) attained a higher cultural level than any other minority peoples in Arakan. They were the smelters of iron, the distillers of spirits, the makers of earthen vessels, manufacturers of salt, builders of boats etc.

== Distribution ==
The Daingnet people are found in and around Maungdaw, Buthidaung, Kyauktaw, Paletwa and Mrauk-U. Many Daingnets also live in the Arakan Yoma mountains, close to the Chin state and Chittagong Hill Tracts.

== Culture ==
The Daingnets are culturally similar to the Chakmas and Rakhines in Bangladesh and Northeast India. Rice, fish and vegetables are their favorite foods. They prefer hot food. Daingnet people consider cow as a sacred animal and as such they do not eat beef. Men sport lungi and women sport sarong (Pinuin) like dress thami. Usually, men do the agricultural work and women look after children and cook for the family. They usually like to settle near rivers. Some of them also live in mountains whose livelihood is slash and burn cultivation. Daingnet people usually marry early, but never before the age of 17.

Their original language was Tibeto-Burman. Due to prolonged interaction with the Assamese language, their language gradually became a mix of Indo-Aryan and Tibeto-Burman. Majority of the Daingnets are multi-lingual. Apart from their own Chakma language, they can speak Rakhine, Burmese.

== Religion ==
Daingnets are followers of Theravada Buddhism, and for centuries the Daingnets have strictly adhered to its teachings. Almost every village has a Buddhist temple. A Daingnet male at least once in his lifetime becomes a Buddhist monk. However most of them do not remain Buddhist monks for life. Wedding and funeral ceremonies are performed by Buddhist monks. Besides weddings and funerals, the Daingnet people flock to Buddhist temples on major Buddhist festivals which usually fall on full moon days.

== Economy ==
The majority of the Daingnets are farmers. Some of them are traders. Their economy is highly dependent on agriculture and hence vulnerable to weather pattern. However, due to lack of economic development there is widespread poverty among the Daingnets. Religious conviction of Buddhism forbids them to work as fishermen or butchers. There are 2 kinds of farmers among the Daingnets, those who farm land on permanent basis and those who farm hills and mountains by slash and burn or shifting cultivation technique.

== See also ==
- Ethnic groups in Myanmar
