= Chakma language =

Indo-Aryan language of India and Bangladesh

Chakma
- 𑄌𑄋𑄴𑄟𑄳𑄦 𑄞𑄌𑄴
- "Changma Bhach" in Chakma Script
- Pronunciation: [tʃaŋmha]
- Native to: Bangladesh; India; Myanmar
- Region: Bangladesh; Chittagong Hill Tracts; (Rangamati; Khagrachhari; Bandarban); India; Northeast India; (Mizoram; Tripura; Arunachal Pradesh; Assam); Myanmar; Rakhine State
- Ethnicity: Chakma, Daingnet
- Native speakers: 740,000 (2011-2024)
- Language family: Indo-European: Indo-Iranian; Indo-Aryan; Eastern; Bengali–Assamese; Chakma
- Dialects: Tanchangya; Daingnet
- Writing system: Chakma script; Tanchangya alphabets

Official status
- Official language in: India (CADC)
- Recognised minority language in: Bangladesh; Myanmar

Language codes
- ISO 639-3: ccp
- Glottolog: chak1266
- Linguasphere: 59-AAC-?
- IETF: ccp
- Chakma is classified as Definitely Endangered by the UNESCO Atlas of the World's Languages in Danger (2010).

Chakma (/ˈtʃɑːkmə/; autonym: 𑄌𑄋𑄴𑄟𑄳𑄦 𑄞𑄌𑄴) is an Eastern Indic language in the branch of the Indo-Iranian languages in the Indo-European language family, whose speakers are known as the Chakma or the Daingnet people. It is a creole of Bengali and Chin (Tibeto-Burman) language which has the substratam of their previously spoken Tibeto-Burman language. It has nearly 1 million speakers, with 60% residing in the Chittagong Hill Tracts (CHT) in Bangladesh and 35% spread across Arunachal Pradesh, Assam, Mizoram and Tripura in India. The remaining 5% live in Myanmar. The language has its own script, the Chakma script or the ajhapat (𑄌𑄋𑄴𑄟𑄳𑄦 𑄃𑄧𑄏𑄛𑄖𑄴), which is an abugida similar to other South-east Asian scripts. It is mutually intelligible with the Chittagonian language. Besides Chittagonian, the language is also mutually intelligible with Tanchangya, Noakhali and Rohingya.

Similarities of the Chakma language with Sanskrit, Prakrit and with Pali is visible referring it to be a classical language. This suggests that the Chakmas have been present in the Indian subcontinent since ancient times. Cultural exchanges with neighboring communities have led to the adoption of Indo-Aryan and Arakanese terms. Studies suggest that the language may have originally been a Tibeto-Burman language before transitioning into an Indic language. However, there are abundant of vocabularies used in the Chakma language that do belong neither to Indo-Aryan nor Tibeto-Burman linguistic group, likely originating from their ancestral language. Historically, a Mongoloid group that settled in the Himalayan foothills spoke a Tibetan-related language but gradually incorporated Aryan vocabulary.

== Classification ==
Chakma is classified as an Eastern Indo-Aryan language within the Bengali-Gauda subgroup. According to American linguist Masica (1991), Chakmas formerly spoke a Chin language , which later mixed with Bengali and turned into a Bengali-Chin creole that exhibits features of their previously spoken Tibeto-Burman language. Studies indicate that the Chakma people originally spoke a Tibeto-Burman language belonging to the Jingpo-Luish branch before adopting their current Indo-Aryan language variety. This historical language shift was aimed at consolidating intertribal power. Evidence of this transition is preserved in the Chakma lexicon, which contains abundant vocabulary items that belong neither to Indo-Aryan nor Tibeto-Burman linguistic groups, likely originating from their ancestral language. Despite its Indo-Aryan classification, Chakma is notably tonal—a characteristic rare among Indo-Aryan languages, which are typically non-tonal. This tonal feature is believed to be a substrate influence from the earlier Tibeto-Burman language.

== History ==
=== Origins and Early Development ===
The earliest form of the Chakma language appears to have been distinct from both Indo-Aryan and Tibeto-Burman languages. Evidence for this comes from a significant portion of the Chakma vocabulary, which does not closely resemble words in either linguistic group. This suggests that early Chakma may have belonged to an isolated or lesser-documented linguistic lineage before later influences shaped its development.

Historical migration patterns indicate that the Chakma people likely moved from Magadha (modern Bihar, India) to Arakan (Rakhine State, Myanmar) before settling in the Chittagong Hill Tracts. During this journey, their language encountered and absorbed elements from Pali and Sanskrit, particularly in religious and administrative contexts. At the same time, interactions with Burmese and Arakanese speakers introduced phonetic and structural adaptations, though the core vocabulary remained distinct.

=== Medieval Chakma ===
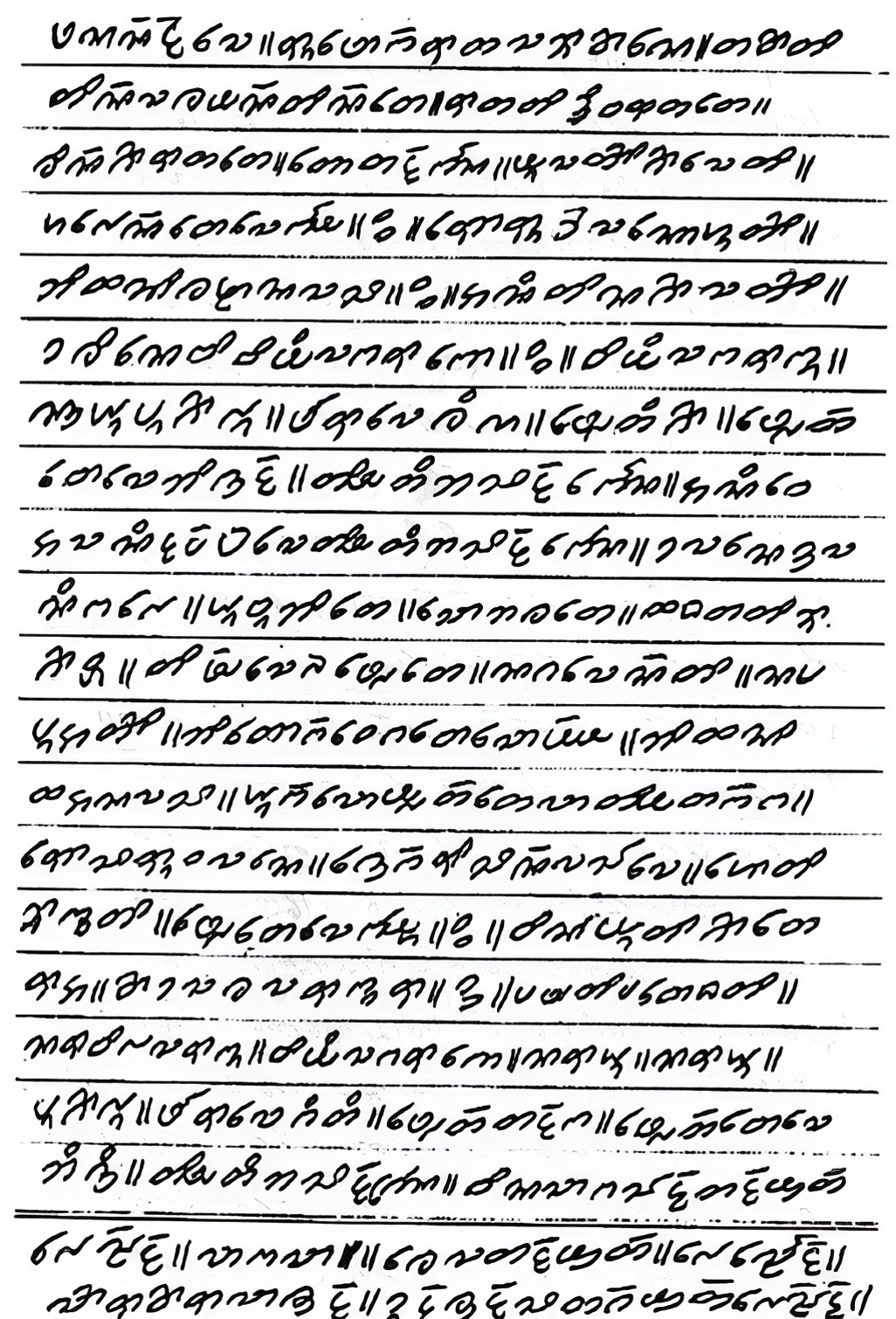
A sample of Paw'rangpulu Tara used by Chakma Luri(Buddhist priest).

The Chakma and Daingnet people now speak what may be considered divergent dialects of Magadhi Prakrit. However, this is due to language shift from a Tibeto-Burman language; that medieval language may have been related to Sak or Chairel (and therefore of the Brahmaputran branch).

Scholars discovered nearly century-old Chakma manuscripts bound in animal hide, preserved by the Chakma community. Displayed at a seminar in Pecharthal, Tripura, these texts cover history, culture, music, herbal medicine, and Buddhism. Written in Chakma script on handmade tree-bark paper, the ink was sourced from China via Myanmar. Over 3,000 such manuscripts exist, with some now conserved by Tripura University. This discovery highlights the rich literary heritage of the Chakma language.

=== Modern Chakma ===
It is officially recognized by the government of Tripura in India and also by the government of Bangladesh. In India, it is also spoken primarily in the Chakma Autonomous District Council (CADC) which consists of the Tuichawng constituency of Lawngtlai district in Mizoram and many places in Tripura.

Although there were no Chakma language radio or television stations as of 2011, the language has a presence in social media and on YouTube. The Hill Education Chakma Script website provides tutorials, videos, e-books, and Chakma language forums.

In 2012, the government of Tripura announced the implementation of Chakma language in Chakma Script (or Ajhā Pāṭh) in primary schools of Tripura. Imparting of education up to the elementary stage in the mother tongue is a national policy. To begin with, Chakma language subjects in its own scripts has been introduced in 87 primary schools in Chakma concentrated areas in Tripura."

"In preparation for the January 2014 education season, the national curriculum and textbook board has already started printing books in six languages ... Chakma, Kokborok (Tripura community), Marma, Santal, Sadri (Orao community) and Achik."

Mor Thengari (My Bicycle) was Bangladesh's first Chakma-language movie. However, it was banned in Bangladesh due to its controversial plot.

== Phonology ==
=== Vowels sounds ===
Vowels
	Front	Central	Back
Close	i		u
Close-mid	e		o
Open-mid	ɛ		ɔ
Open	æ	a	

=== Consonant sounds ===
Chakma Consonants
		Labial	Dental	Alveolar	Post- alveolar	Palatal	Velar	Glottal
Plosive	voiceless	p	t				k	
Plosive	voiced	b	d				ɡ	
Plosive	breathy	bʱ	dʱ				ɡʱ	
Affricate	voiceless				tʃ			
Affricate	voiced				dʒ			
Fricative	voiceless			s	(ʃ)			h
Fricative	voiced			z				
Nasal		m		n			ŋ	
Trill/Tap				r	ɽ			
Approximant		w		l		j		

- /p/ can be heard as [ɸ] in intervocalic and word-final positions.
- /t k/ can be heard as [t̪ʰ x] in word-initial and intervocalic positions.
- A /ʃ/ sound is rare, and in some cases, is a free variant sound of /s/.

=== Tones ===
Chakma is a tonal language, it has contrastive tones; differences in the pitch of the speaker's voice can distinguish words.

== Writing system ==
The Chakma script is an abugida that belongs to the Brahmic family of scripts. Chakma evolved from the Burmese script, which was ultimately derived from Pallava.

== Sample text ==
Article 1 of the Universal Declaration of Human Rights:

𑄝𑄬𑄉𑄴 𑄟𑄪𑄚𑄨𑄥𑄳𑄥𑄧𑄨𑄢𑄧 𑄃𑄪𑄚𑄧 𑄥𑄴𑄤𑄙𑄩𑄚𑄴 𑄉𑄧𑄢𑄨 𑄃𑄬𑄇𑄴𑄇𑄪𑄃𑄨 𑄟𑄧𑄢𑄴𑄡𑄘 𑄃𑄢𑄴 𑄃𑄧𑄙𑄨𑄇𑄢𑄴 𑄣𑄧𑄚𑄬 𑄣𑄰 𑄎𑄧𑄚𑄴𑄟𑄧 𑄃𑄧𑄚𑄴𑅂 𑄖𑄢𑄢𑄴 𑄝𑄨𑄝𑄬𑄇𑄴 𑄝𑄪𑄘𑄴𑄙𑄨 𑄝𑄬𑄇𑄴𑄇𑄚𑄨 𑄃𑄉𑄬𑅁 𑄥𑄬𑄚𑄧𑄖𑄴𑄖𑄬 𑄃𑄟𑄢𑄴 𑄛𑄬𑄇𑄴𑄇𑄪𑄚𑄬𑄣𑄴𑄣𑄯𑄃𑄨 𑄘𑄮𑄣𑄴 𑄌𑄨𑄖𑄴𑄖𑄧𑄣𑄰 𑄃𑄧𑄋𑄛𑄧𑄢𑄧𑄕 𑄃𑄪𑄌𑄨𑄖𑄴𑅂
Baeg munissor un svadin gori aekkui marzwada ar udhigar lwnae loi dzawnawm oiun. Tarar bibaek buddee beakkani aageh. Saenwtte aamaa beakkundwai dol sittawloi songporona uzidh.
All human beings are born free and equal in dignity and rights. They are endowed with reason and conscience and should act towards one another in a spirit of brotherhood.

== Educational institutions ==
The Chakma language is being taught in many government and private schools in India (Tripura, Mizoram, Arunachal Pradesh) and Bangladesh. The Chakma language was officially introduced in primary schools by the government of Tripura under The Directorate of Kokborok & Other Minority Languages in 2004 through the Bengali script and since 2013, through the Chakma script (also known as Ajhā Pāṭh). The language is currently being taught in 87 schools.
