= Juraichhari Union =

Union of Rangamati District, Chittagong, Bangladesh

Juraichhari জুরাছড়ি
- Union
- Interactive map of Juraichhari
- Country: Bangladesh
- Division: Chittagong Division
- District: Rangamati District
- Upazila: Jurachhari Upazila

Area
  - Total: 93.24 km^{2} (36.00 sq mi)

Population (2022)
  - Total: 9,369
  - Density: 100.5/km^{2} (260.2/sq mi)
- Time zone: UTC+6 (BST)
- Postal code: 4560
- Website: juraichariup.rangamati.gov.bd

Juraichhari Union is a union of Juraichhari Upazila under Rangamati District.

== Demography ==
According to 2022 census, total population of the Union are 9,369. Among them, 351 are Muslim, 8,899 are Buddhist, 114 are Hindu and 5 are Christian.

Religion-2022
1. Buddhism (95.0%)
2. Islam (3.75%)
3. Hinduism (1.22%)
4. Christianity (0.05%)
5. Others (0.00%)

== Ethnicity ==
This Union is home to a variety of different ethnic groups. Among them, 563 are Bengali, 8,761 are Chakma and 45 are of others ethnic groups.

Ethnicity-2022
1. Chakma (93.5%)
2. Bengali (6.01%)
3. Others (0.38%)
