= Rangamati Sadar Upazila =

Rangamati Sadar রাঙামাটি সদর
- Upazila
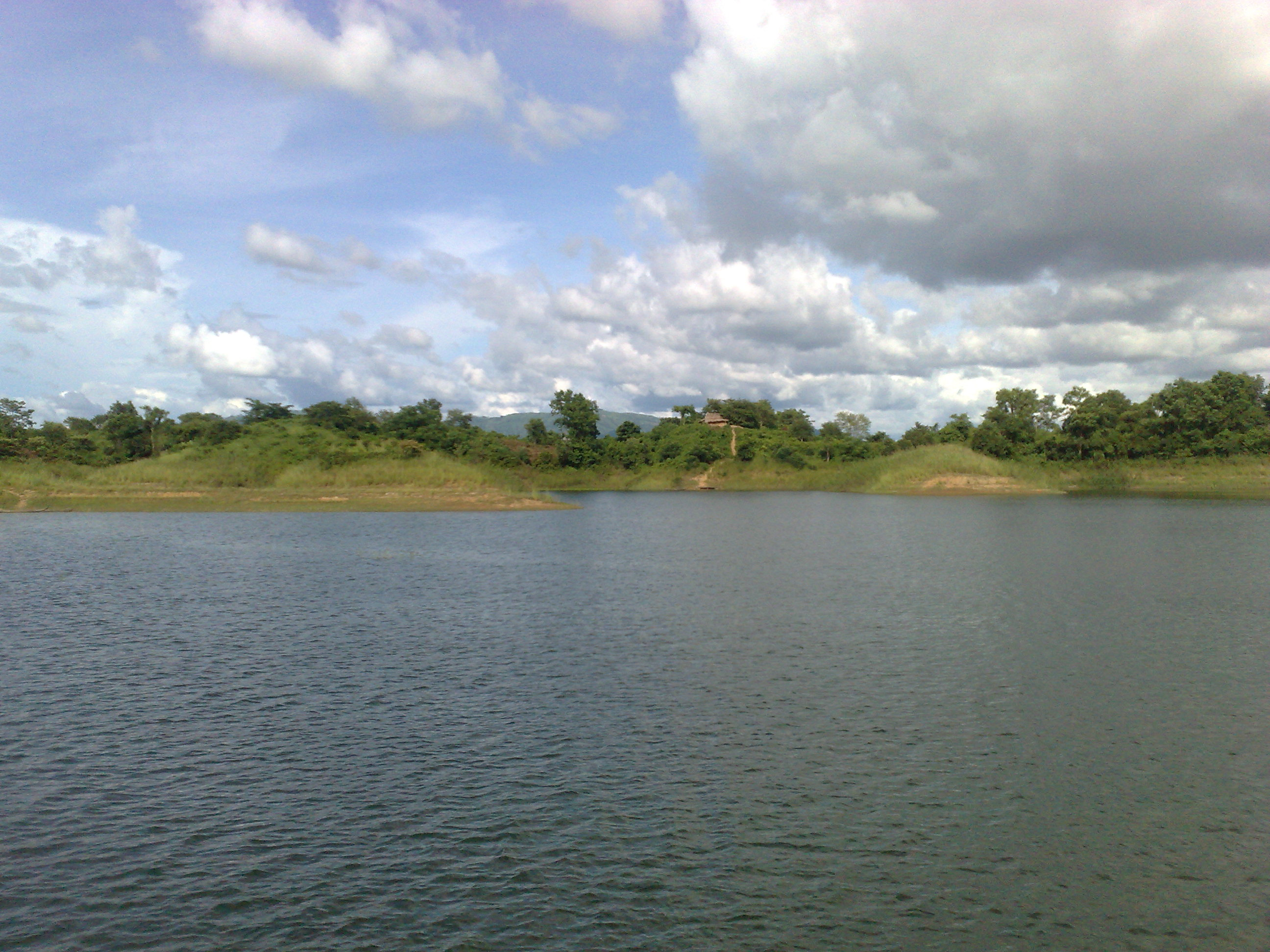
- Kaptai lake, Rangamati Sadar

- Coordinates: 22°39′N 92°11′E
- Country: Bangladesh
- Division: Chittagong
- District: Rangamati
- Jatiya Sangsad constituency: Rangamati
- Formed: 1860; 166 years ago
- Headquarters: Rangamati Sadar Upazila Complex

Government
  - Body: Upazila Council
  - MP: Vacant
  - Chairman: Vacant
  - Executive officer: Rifat Asma

Area
  - Total: 546.48 km^{2} (211.00 sq mi)

Population (2022)
  - Total: 146,601
  - Density: 268.26/km^{2} (694.80/sq mi)
- Time zone: UTC+6 (BST)
- Post code: 4500
- Area code: 0351
- Website: sadar.rangamati.gov.bd

Rangamati Sadar Upazila mauza geocode map

Rangamati Sadar (Bengali: রাঙামাটি সদর) is an upazila of Rangamati District in the Division of Chittagong, Bangladesh.

== Geography ==
Rangamati Sadar is located at 22.6500°N 92.1833°E. It has a total area of 546.48 km^{2}.

== Demographics ==
According to the 2022 Bangladeshi census, Rangamati Sadar Upazila had 35,596 households and a population of 146,601. 7.48% of the population were under 5 years of age. Rangamati Sadar had a literacy rate (age 7 and over) of 80.51%: 84.70% for males and 75.99% for females, and a sex ratio of 107.53 males for every 100 females. 120,003 (81.86%) lived in urban areas.

=== Ethnicity and religion ===
Religions in Rangamati Sadar Upazila (2022)
Religion	Percent
Buddhism	48.50%
Islam	40.69%
Hinduism	10.29%
Christianity	0.45%
Other or not stated	0.08%

Population by religion in Union/Paurashava
Union/Paurashava	Muslim	Buddhist	Others
Rangamati Paurashava	55,277	36,362	14,430
Balukhali	512	6,422	1,039
Bandukbhanga	31	7,119	11
Jibtali	1,524	2,805	123
Kutukchhari	128	6,389	133
Magban	565	6,913	16
Sapchhari	1,608	5,090	114

🟩 Muslim majority 🟧 Buddhist majority

As of the 2022 Bangladeshi census, Rangamati Sadar upazila had 35,614 households and a population of 146,601. 24,486 (19.63%) were under 10 years of age. Rangamati Sadar had an average literacy rate of 73.24%, compared to the national average of 74.80%, and a sex ratio of 884 females per 1000 males. 81.86% of the population lived in urban areas.The ethnic population was 69,883 (47.67%), of which Chakma were 60,449, Tanchangya 3,488, Marma 2,765 and Tripura 2,206.

Ethnicity in Rangamati Upazila (2022)
1. Bengali (52.3%)
2. Chakma (41.2%)
3. Tanchangya (2.38%)
4. Marma (1.89%)
5. Tripura (1.50%)
6. Others (0.67%)

Population by ethnicity in Union/Paurashava
Union/Paurashava	Bengali	Chakma	Marma	Tonchongya	Others
Rangamati Paurashava	71,741	29,334	1,743	1,208	2,034
Balukhali	598	5,684	138	522	1,021
Bandukbhanga	93	7,043	8	1	15
Jibtali	1,706	1,961	535	250	0
Kutukchhari	279	6,310	14	5	42
Magban	595	5,087	310	1,497	5
Sapchhari	1,696	5,030	17	5	64

🟩 Bengali majority 🟨 Chakma majority

== Administration ==
UNO: Refat Asma.

Rangamati Sadar Upazila is divided into Rangamati Municipality and six union parishads: Balukhali, Bandukbhanga, Jibtali, Kutukchhari, Magban, and Sapchhari. The union parishads are subdivided into 21 mauzas and 178 villages.

== Education ==
There are many educational institutions.

- Lakers' Public School and College
- Rangamati Science and Technology University
- Rangamati Medical College

== See also ==
- Upazilas of Bangladesh
- Districts of Bangladesh
- Divisions of Bangladesh
