= Tanchangya script =

Abugida script used to write Tanchangya language

Tanchangya Ka-Pat 𑄖𑄧𑄐𑄴𑄌𑄧𑄁𑄉𑄴𑄡
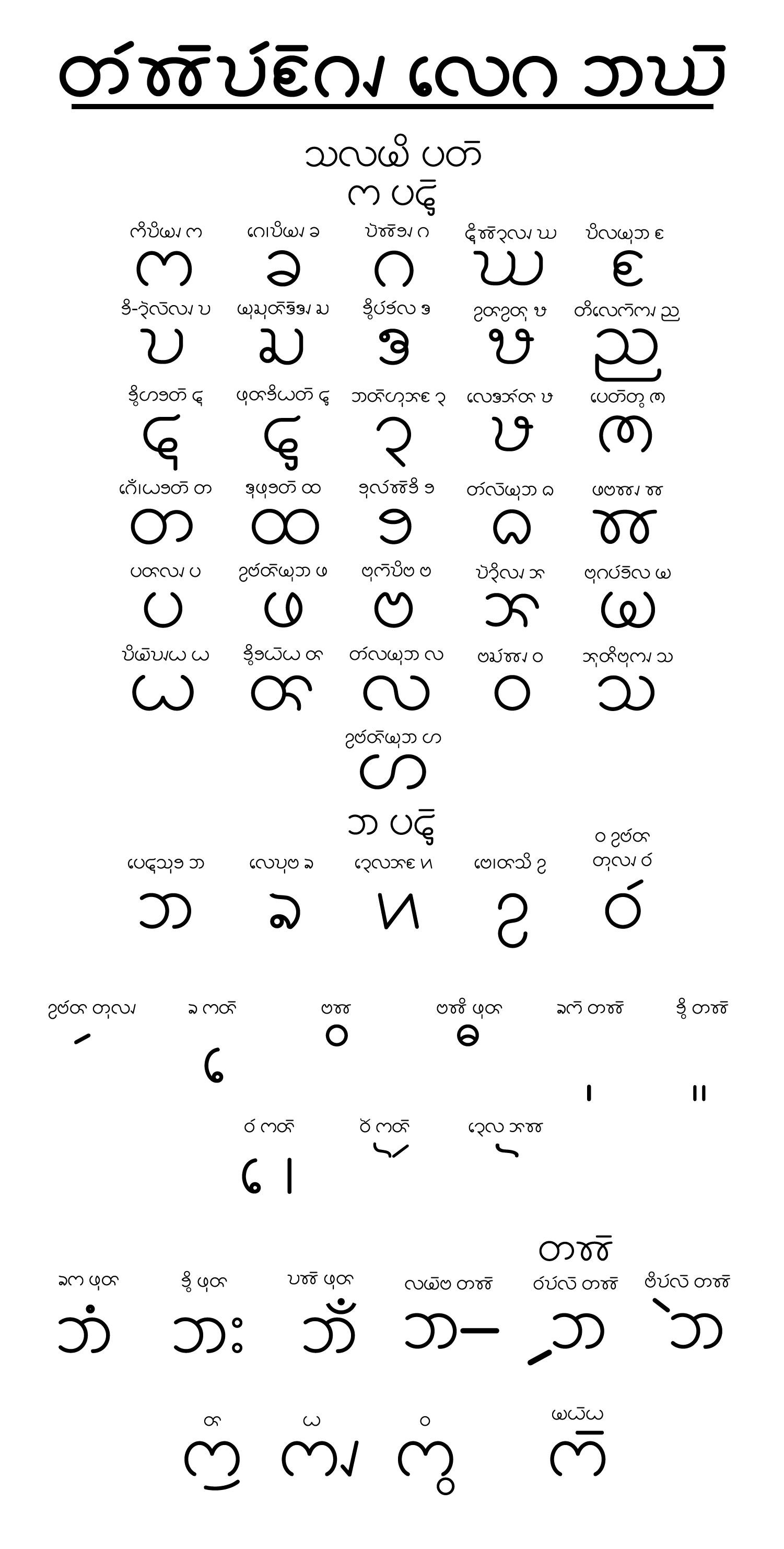
- Tanchangya Alphabet Chart
- Script type: Abugida
- Period: c. 600 CE – present
- Direction: Left-to-right
- Region: Chittagong Hill Tracts (Bangladesh); Mizoram and Tripura (India); Rakhine State (Myanmar)
- Languages: Tanchangya language

Related scripts
- Parent systems: Proto-Sinaitic alphabet: Phoenician alphabet; Aramaic alphabet; Brahmi script; Pallava alphabet; Mon; Tanchangya
- Sister systems: Chakma script; Burmese script; Mon script; S'gaw Karen alphabet; Khmer script; Ahom alphabet

The Tanchangya script (Tanchangya: 𑄖𑄧𑄐𑄴𑄌𑄧𑄁𑄉𑄴𑄡), also known as Ka-Pat, is an abugida used to write the Tanchangya language. It is in the southern Brahmic family of scripts. Due to its script family, it has similarities to the Burmese alphabet, and Mon alphabet.

== Origin ==
The script seems to be derived from ancient Brahmic scripts, which inherited the vowel sound within the consonants. If not an independent derivation, it should have derived from Burmese or Mon. It is believed that they had used the Brahmic scripts in the earlier stages, which were known by the term Thek or Sakya in northern Myanmar.

The Tanchangya script was introduced recently in 2012 by adopting a manuscript in Rakhine State as stated by Rupak Debnath. Though both Chakma and Tanchangya have been using the present Chakma script for a long time, it is still unconfirmed who the alphabet originally belonged to and who introduced it. John M. Clifton in his ‘’Dialects, Orthography and Society ‘’opined that ‘the Tanchangya community decided to base their alphabet on the Chakma to show they were related to the Chakma. However, they systematically changed the alphabet to show that they were different from the Chakma they were not simply a part of the larger Chakma community.’ Moreover, in order not to cause misunderstanding between the two communities, Tanchangya has introduced these alphabets which are yet to develop into Unicode font. For the time being, it is just created as True Font.

== Characteristics ==
It is written from left to right, similar to Brahmi scripts, unlike the Kharosti, which were used to write from right to left.

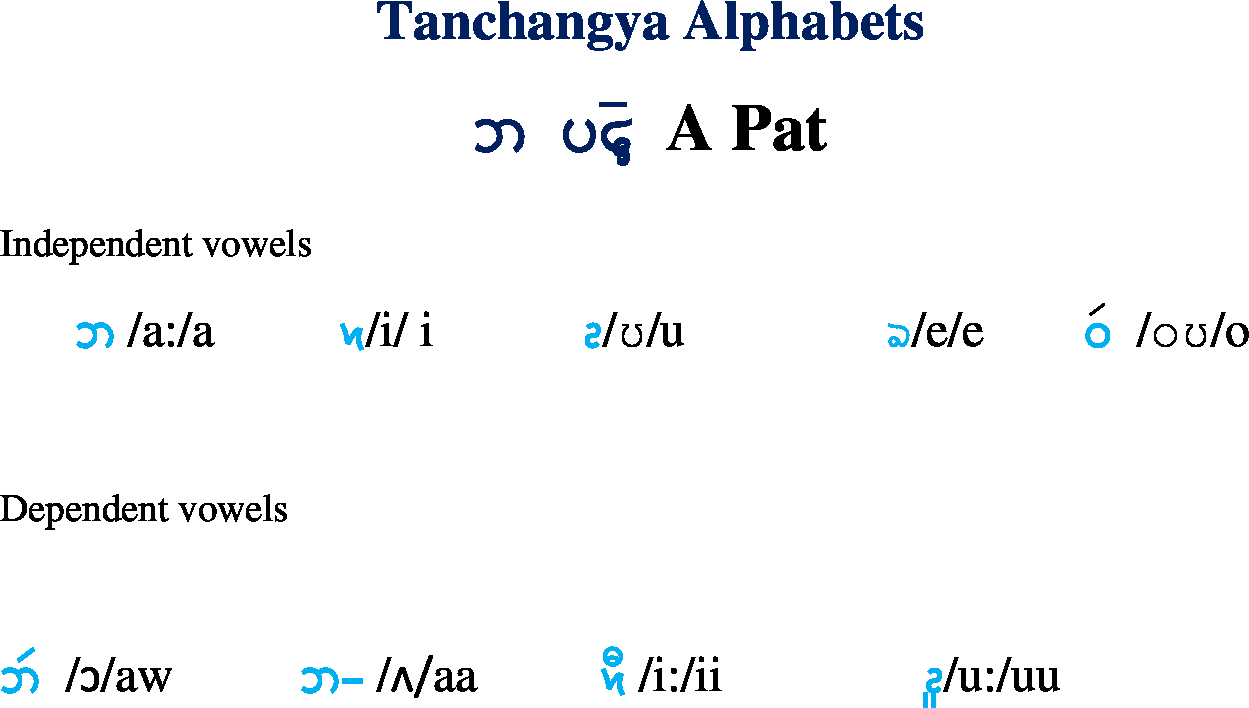

=== Vowels ===
There are five independent vowels such as A (a:), I(i), v(ʊ), E(e), and O a(oʊ). The other five vowels are dependent namely, Aa(ɔ), AA(ʌ), Ii(i:), and Uu(u:).

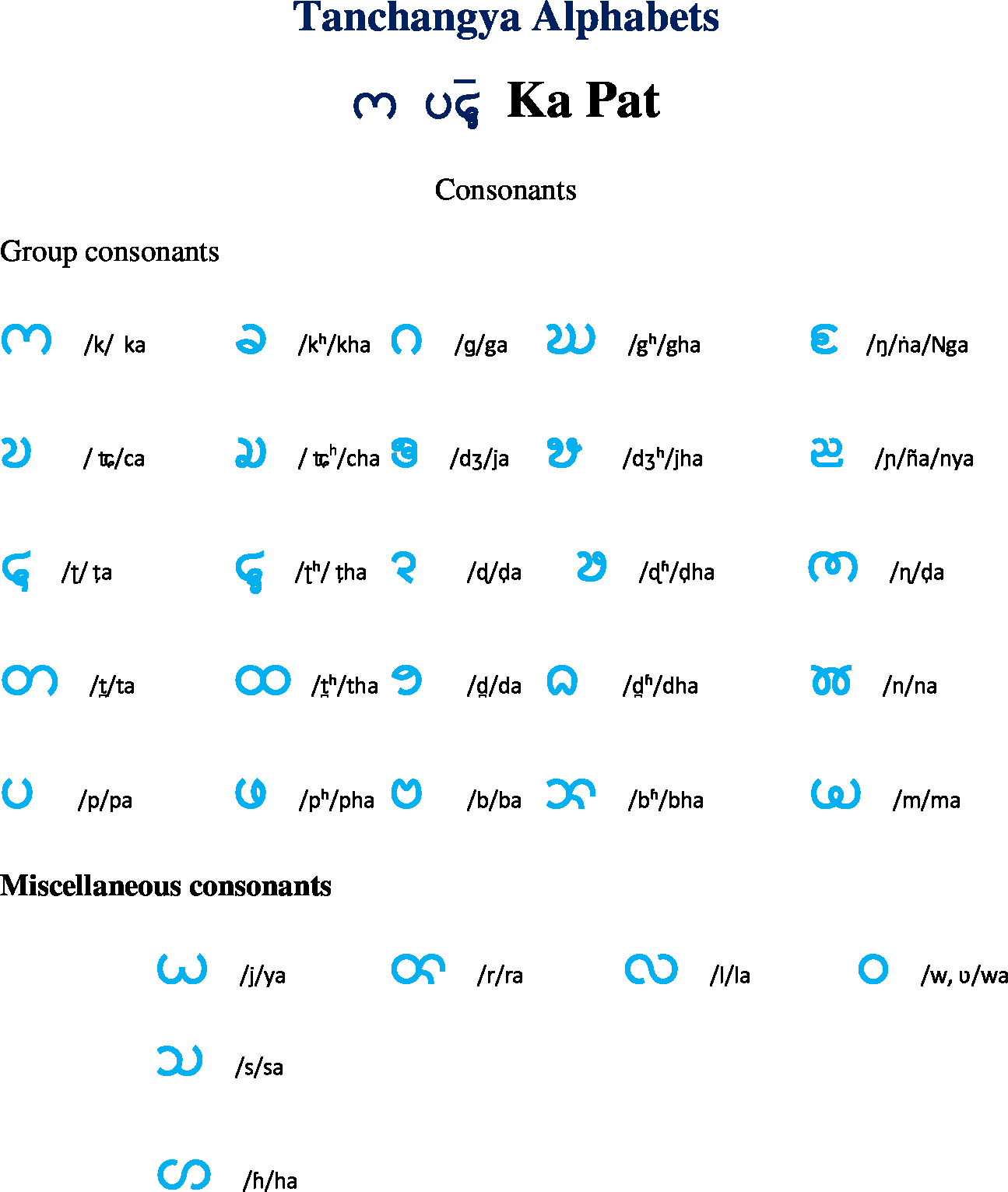

=== Consonants ===
There are thirty-one consonants letter found in the Tanchangya script. They are classified into group consonants and miscellaneous consonants.
