= Tanchangya language =

Indigenous language of Bangladesh

Tanchangya
- 𑄖𑄧𑄐𑄴𑄌𑄧𑄁𑄉𑄴𑄡
- 'Tanchangya' in Tanchangya/Chakma script
- Pronunciation: [ˈtɒntʃɒŋɛ]
- Native to: Bangladesh
- Region: Chittagong Hill Tracts (Bangladesh); Mizoram and Tripura (India); Rakhine State (Myanmar)
- Ethnicity: Tanchangya
- Native speakers: 46,000 (2022)
- Language family: Indo-European: Indo-Iranian; Indo-Aryan; Eastern; Bengali–Assamese; Tanchangya
- Writing system: Tanchangya alphabet

Language codes
- ISO 639-3: tnv
- Glottolog: tang1330

The Tanchangya language is one of the eleven indigenous languages spoken in the Chittagong Hill Tracts, Mizoram, Tripura, and Rakhine State. Despite the common belief that it is a Tibeto-Burman language, it is categorized as a Indo-Aryan language. It is closely related to Chakma, Chittagonian, Noakhali and Rohingya languages. It is primarily spoken by the Tanchangyas people.

== Vocabulary ==
Tanchangya has many words from Indo-Aryan languages. It also maintains some Burmanised words, particularly in Buddhist terminologies.

=== Ancient Tanchangya ===
The original words of Tanchangya are believed to be from ancient Tanchangya.

Tanchangya	English
Awga (অগা)	Uneducated, uncivilised
Awnsur (অন্সুর্)	Regularly, always
Awnawpinaw (অন-পিন); Awnaw-sawnaw (অন- সনঅ)	Insane, foolish
Awrawk (অরক্)	Nest
Hawla (হলা)	Fry, thick shrub bushes
Awsangya (অসাঙ্যা); Besangya (বেসাঙ্যা)	An unmarriageable relation
A-uk/Aruk (আ-উক্, আরুক্)	Picture; Sketch

=== Tibeto-Burman ===
Although it does not belong to the Tibeto-Burman language family, many Buddhist terms can be found in Tanchangya.

=== Foreign words ===
In Tanchangya, words derived from Arabic, Portuguese, and English can be found.

Tanchangya	Arabic/Portuguese	English
Awktaw (অক্ত)	Owakta (Arabic)	Time
Gawrba (গর্বা)	Gorba(Arabic)	Guest
Gamala/Gabala (গাবালা, গামালা)	Gamela (Portuguese)	Bucket
Balti (বাল্তি)	Balde (Portuguese)	Bucket

=== Chakma ===
Outside of the Tanchangya tribe, there is a common belief that there is no difference between Tanchangya and the Chakma language.

Tanchangya	Chakma	English
Bitsyawl	Bijol	Smooth
Pawd, Jangal	Pawt	Road
Awna sawna	Awnaw sawnaw	Half-brain
Diri, Bilawng	Dighol	Long time
