= Tanchangya people =

Indigenous ethnic group found in south Asia

Tanchangya
𑄖𑄧𑄐𑄴𑄌𑄧𑄁𑄉𑄴𑄡 তঞ্চঙ্গ্যা
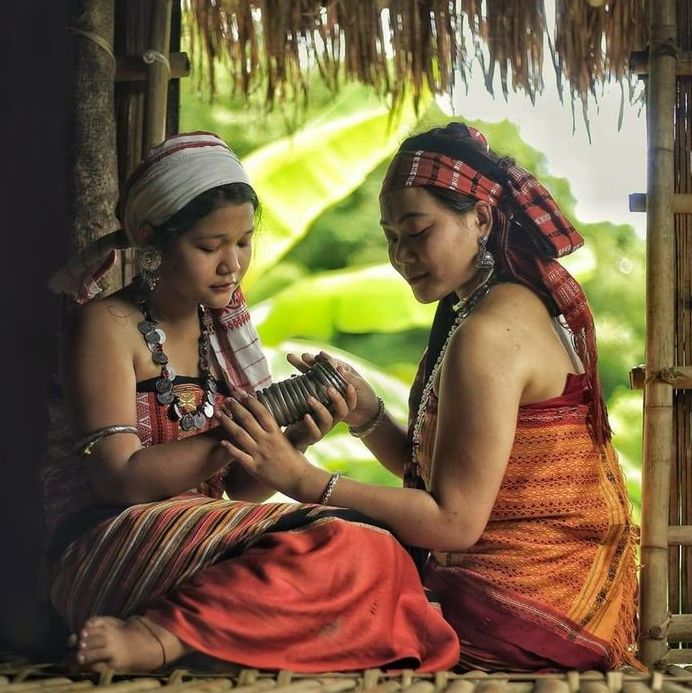
- Tanchangya women

Total population
- ≥45,972

Regions with significant populations
- Bangladesh, India, Myanmar
- Bangladesh: 45,972 (2022)
- India: 10,774
- Myanmar: 30,000

Languages
- Tanchangya

Religion
- Buddhism • Christianity • others

Related ethnic groups
- Chakma, Daingnet, Chak, Rakhine, Bamar

- People: Tanchangya
- Language: Tanchangya (𑄖𑄧𑄐𑄴𑄌𑄧𑄁𑄉𑄴𑄡)
- Country: Chapre (ancient homeland), Bangladesh, Myanmar, India

The Tanchangya people, Tonchonga, Tanchangyas or Tonchongyas (/ˈtɒntʃɒŋɛ/) are an ethnic group living in the Chittagong Hill Tracts (CHT) of Bangladesh, Indian states of Tripura and Mizoram, and Rakhine state of Myanmar.

According to the 2022 census, there are 45,972 Tanchangyas in Bangladesh.

== History ==
The Daingnaks are mentioned together in history in the early fourteenth century AD. The Daingnak or Tongchangya are identified as Sak captives of Macchagiri, settled in the Aeng-Dalak region, Kyaukpu district by king Mengdi (Minhti).

The Tanchangya people migrated to present-day Bangladesh after facing severe oppression in Arakan. According to historical accounts, the Rakhines persecuted the Dainaks (Tanchangyas). Unable to endure the mistreatment, the Tanchangyas left their homeland of Chaprei in 1418 AD. Traveling through dense forests and crossing the Naf River, they eventually arrived in Chittagong. At that time, the ruler of Chittagong, Jamal Uddin, granted them permission to settle in twelve villages located in the Taingang River basin near the Matamuhuri River, an area that is now part of Alikadam upazila. Over time, the Tanchangyas gradually dispersed and established communities across various regions of the Chittagong Hill Tracts.

== Geographical location ==
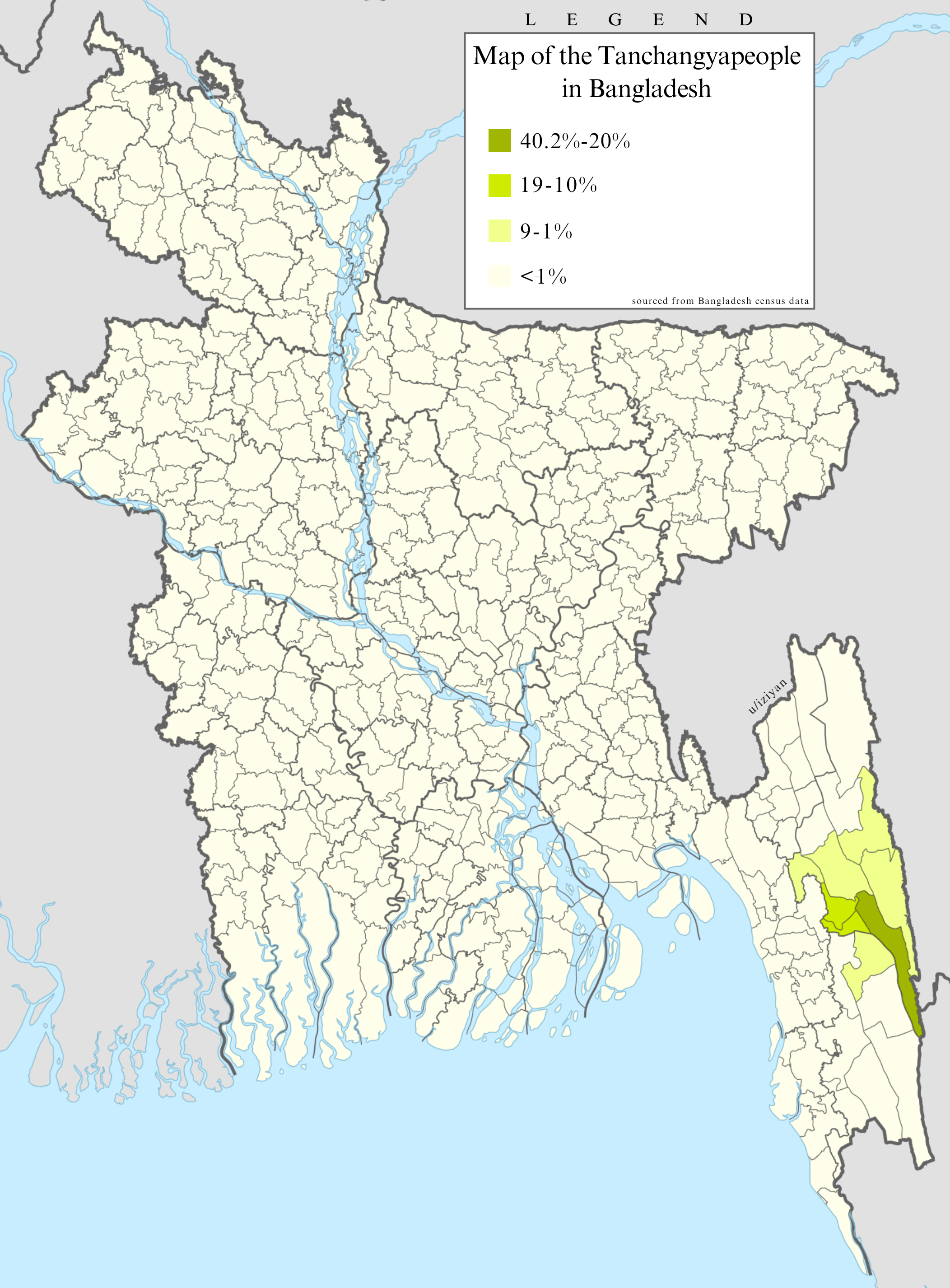
Map showing the percentage of Tanchangya population by Upazila in Bangladesh

According to the 2022 Bangladeshi census, there are 45,972 Tanchangyas in Bangladesh. They are mainly found in Chittagong Division: 27,975 in Rangamati District, 14,889 in Bandarban District, 1,674 in Chattogram District, and 977 in Cox's Bazar District.

They are the largest ethnic group in Belaichhari Upazila (38.77%) and second largest in Rowangchhari Upazila (14.39%).

Upazila	District	Population	Percentage of Tanchangya
Belaichhari Upazila	Rangamati District	11,452	38.77%
Kaptai Upazila	Rangamati District	6,881	12.42%
Bandarban Sadar Upazila	Bandarban District	5,605	5.05%
Rajasthali Upazila	Rangamati District	4,542	16.30%
Rowangchhari Upazila	Bandarban District	3,990	14.39%
Rangamati Sadar Upazila	Rangamati District	3,488	2.38%
Naikhongchhari Upazila	Bandarban District	2,881	3.77%
Alikadam Upazila	Bandarban District	1,977	3.10%
Rangunia Upazila	Chattogram District	931	0.24%
Juraichhari Upazila	Rangamati District	858	3.33%
Kawkhali Upazila	Rangamati District	677	1.02%
Ukhia Upazila	Cox's Bazar District	469	0.18%
Teknaf Upazila	Cox's Bazar District	467	0.14%
Ruma Upazila	Bandarban District	241	0.74%
Chandanaish Upazila	Chattogram District	240	0.09%
Lama Upazila	Bandarban District	183	0.13%
Others		<100	

== Culture ==
=== Language and script ===
Tanchangyas people primarily speak Tanchangya language. The language category is debatable. According to Rupak Debnath, Tanchangya retains several features of Tibeto-Burman. Tanchangya people have their own script.

The Tanchangya language is a mixture of Pali, Sanskrit, Prakrit, Chakma and Bengali, with some English words incorporated. In Arakanese language, "Taung" or "Tong" means 'hill', while "Taungya" refers to hilltop swidden cultivation, commonly known as jhum. Therefore, "Tanchangya" translates to "hill swidden farmer."

=== Religion ===
Tanchangya people are Buddhists, a Theravadin who venerates Buddha and on specific occasions performs Buddhist ceremonies kathino Civara Dana, Buddha Purnima, maghi purnima etc. They have at least one Buddhist vihara in their localities.

=== Dress and ornaments ===
Traditionally, Tanchangya women wear colorful dresses and ornaments. The full dress of a Tanchangya woman is collectively known as "Paiet Kapor", which literally translates to "five parts." These five parts are:

- (1) "Pinuin", which is in seven colors with stripes
- (2) "Paduri", which is used as a belt
- (3) "Mada-khobong" which is worn on the head
- (4) "Khadi", which is used as a scarf,
- (5) "Chalum", which is a blouse.

Tanchangya ornaments include "Rajjur & Jhanga" for the ears, "Baghor & Kuchikharu" for the wrists, "Tajjur" for the arms, "Chandrahar, Hochuli, and Sikchara" for the neck. These ornaments are made mainly of silver. Tanchangya men traditionally wear a loincloth and long-sleeved shirts.

=== Musical instruments ===
Tanchangya has rich musical instruments that are handmade. Bansi, Khengkhong, Dhuruk, Singa and Suma are the traditional musical instruments of the Tanchangya. They enjoy during their leisure time, particularly after harvesting paddy from shifting cultivation.

=== Occupation ===
Agriculture is the main occupation of the Tanchangyas; they practice jhum, a traditional slash-and-burn farming method. They cultivate paddy, ginger, garlic, bagurpada (e.g. coriander), etc. on hill slopes. Literacy among Tanchangyas is low. A few of them serve in government and non-government organizations. Today, Tanchangya is a developing ethnic community on the international level. Nowadays, many Tanchangyas are service people and professionals such as doctors, engineers, lawyers, teachers, etc. They also are trying hard to become retail traders.

=== Traditions ===
Tanchangyas celebrate 'Bishu' as a main enjoyable festival at the end and beginning of the new year. "Pachon" is a special item for Bishu. "Pachon" is a mixed vegetable with dried fish etc. Nowadays "Bishu mela" is organized in Tanchangyas localities. "Ghila kala", "Nahdeng kala", and "Gudhu kala" are the Tanchangyas Traditional sports.

Upon the death of an individual, the body is bathed and covered with a white cloth. People pray for the departed soul in the presence of monks. The eldest son or a close relative of the deceased then shifts the body to the funeral pyre. The next day, they collect the burnt bones in a pot and cover them with a piece of cloth. Then they throw the burnt bones into a river.

The male children of a deceased Tanchangya father divide the property equally among themselves. The daughters cannot claim any share of the property except when they have no brothers. If the deceased father has no children, an adopted son inherits all the property. If a wife is separated when she is pregnant and if she gives birth to a male child, he will inherit her ex-husband's property. If someone dies as a bachelor or without any children, his property will go to his brothers.
