= Kaptai =

Kaptai may refer to places in Bangladesh:

- Kaptai Upazila, an upazila in Rangamati District
- Kaptai Union, an union in Kaptai Upazila
- Kaptai Cantonment, a Cantonment in Rangamati District
- Kaptai Dam, an artificial dam in Rangamati District
- Kaptai Lake, the largest lake in Bangladesh
- Kaptai road, Chittagong-Kaptai highway
- Kaptai High School, a school in Kaptai Upazila
- Kaptai National Park, a wildlife sanctuary in Rangamati District
