= Rajasthali Upazila =

Rajasthali রাজস্থলী
- Upazila
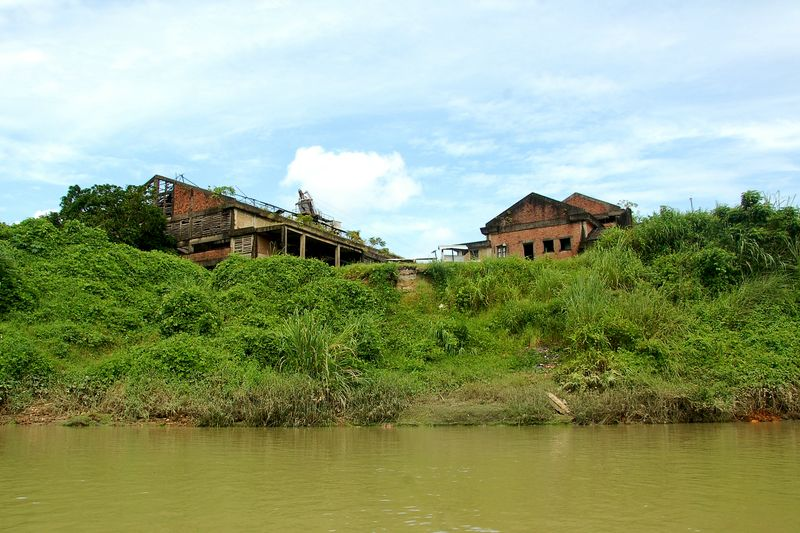
- Hills next to a lake in Rajasthali

- Coordinates: 22°23′N 92°14.5′E
- Country: Bangladesh
- Division: Chittagong
- District: Rangamati

Area
  - Total: 145.03 km^{2} (56.00 sq mi)

Population (2022)
  - Total: 27,864
  - Density: 192.13/km^{2} (497.60/sq mi)
- Time zone: UTC+6 (BST)
- Postal code: 4540
- Website: rajasthali.rangamati.gov.bd

Rajasthali Upazila mauza geocode map

Rajasthali (Bengali: রাজস্থলী) is an upazila of Rangamati District in the Division of Chittagong, Bangladesh.

== Geography ==
Rajasthali is located at 22.3833°N 92.2417°E. It has a total area of 145.03 km^{2}. It is bordered by Kaptai upazila to the north, Belaichhari upazila to the east, Bandarban district to the south and Chittagong district to the west.

== Demographics ==
According to the 2022 Bangladeshi census, Rajasthali Upazila had 6,984 households and a population of 27,864. 8.46% of the population were under 5 years of age. Rajasthali had a literacy rate (age 7 and over) of 68.02%: 75.48% for males and 60.37% for females, and a sex ratio of 102.90 males for every 100 females. 7,154 (25.67%) lived in urban areas.

=== Ethnicity and religion ===
Religions in Rajasthali Upazila (2022)
Religion	Percent
Buddhism	58.48%
Islam	21.92%
Christianity	10.83%
Hinduism	8.77%
Other or not stated	0.004%

Population by religion in Union
Union	Muslim	Buddhist	Christian	Hindu	Others
Bangalhalia	3,934	5,157	196	1,660	1
Gaindya	1,236	6,740	362	187	0
Ghilachhari	937	4,397	2,459	598	0

🟨 Buddhist majority

As of the 2022 Bangladeshi census, Rajasthali upazila had a population of 27,864. The ethnic population was 18,855 (67.67%), of which Marma were 10,213, Tanchangya 4,542, Tripura 2,273, Khyang 1,420 and Chakma 269.

Ethnicity in the Rajasthali Upazila (2022)
1. Marma (36.6%)
2. Bengali (32.3%)
3. Tanchangya (16.3%)
4. Tripura (8.16%)
5. Khyang (5.10%)
6. Chakma (0.97%)
7. others (0.49%)

Population by ethnicity in Union
Union	Bengali	Marma	Tonchonga	Chakma	Others
Bangalhalia	6,070	4,161	274	133	310
Gaindya	1,492	5,330	1,157	76	470
Ghilachhari	1,447	722	3,111	60	3,051

🟩 Bengali majority 🟦 Marma majority 🟪 Tonchonga majority

== Administration ==
UNO: Sajib Kanti Rudra.

Rajasthali Upazila is divided into three union parishads: Bangalhalia, Gaindya, and Ghilachhari. The union parishads are subdivided into 9 mauzas and 106 villages.

== See also ==
- Upazilas of Bangladesh
- Districts of Bangladesh
- Divisions of Bangladesh
