= Ghilachhari Union, Rajasthali =

Union of Rangamati District, Chittagong, Bangladesh

Ghilachhari ঘিলাছড়ি
- Union
- Interactive map of Ghilachhari
- Country: Bangladesh
- Division: Chittagong Division
- District: Rangamati District
- Upazila: Rajasthali Upazila

Area
  - Total: 75.11 km^{2} (29.00 sq mi)

Population (2022)
  - Total: 8,391
  - Density: 111.7/km^{2} (289.3/sq mi)
- Time zone: UTC+6 (BST)
- Postal code: 4540
- Website: ghilachariup.rangamati.gov.bd

Ghilachhari Union is a union of Rajasthali Upazila under Rangamati District.

== Demography ==
According to 2022 census, total population of the Union are 8,391. Among them, 937 are Muslim, 4,397 are Buddhist, 2,359 are Christian and 937 are Hindu.

Religion-2022
1. Buddhism (52.4%)
2. Christianity (29.3%)
3. Islam (11.2%)
4. Hinduism (7.13%)
5. Others (0.00%)

== Ethnicity ==
This Union is home to a variety of different ethnic groups. Among them, 1,487 are Bengali, 3,111 are Tanchangya, 722 are Marma, 60 are Chakma and 3,011 are of others ethnic groups.

Ethnicity-2022
1. Tanchangya (37.1%)
2. Bengali (17.7%)
3. Marma (8.60%)
4. Chakma (0.72%)
5. Tripura, Khyang and Others (35.9%)
