= Rangamati District =

District in Chattogram Division, Bangladesh

Rangamati Hill District রাঙামাটি পার্বত্য জেলা
- District of Bangladesh
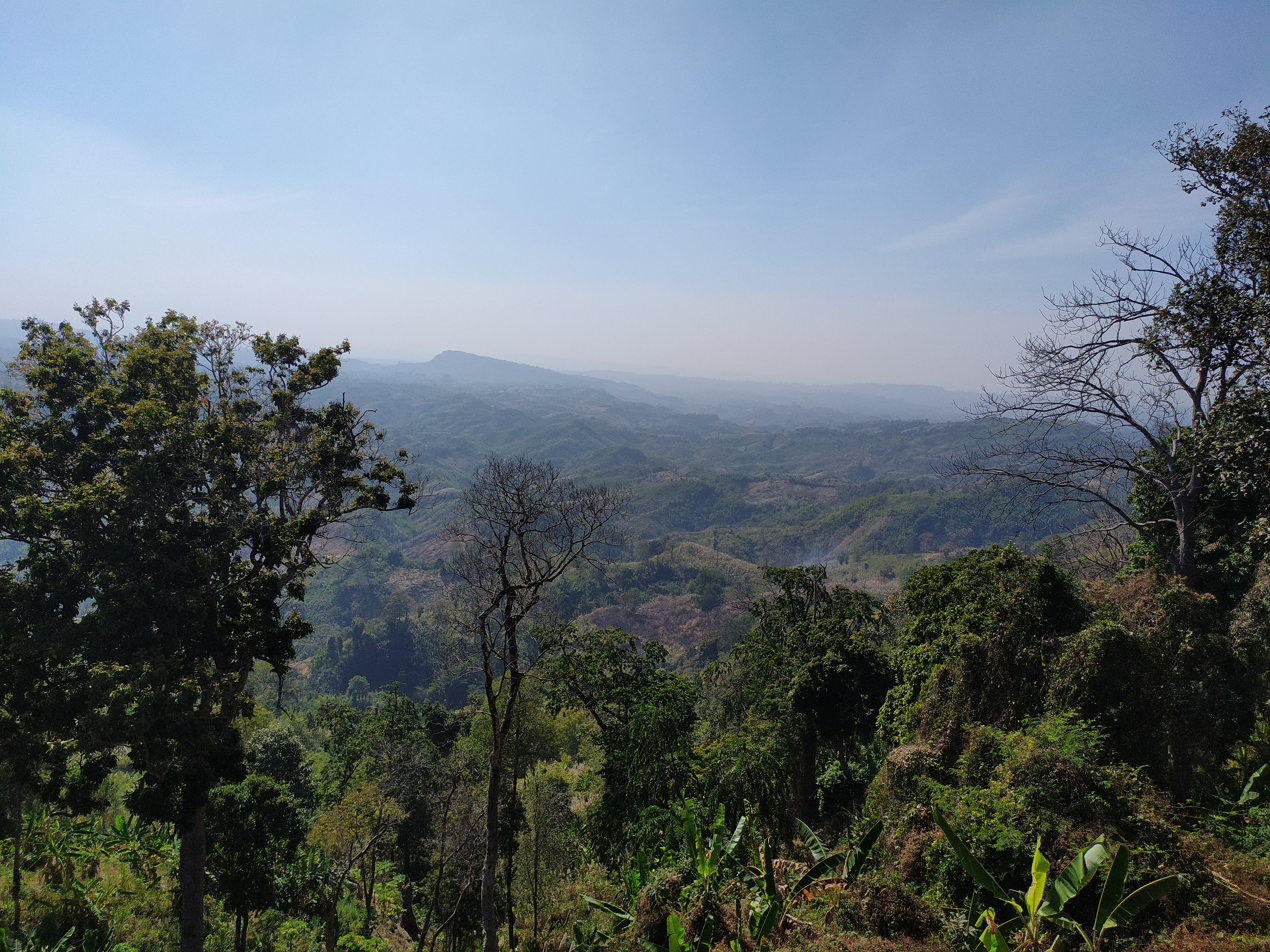
- View of the Sajek Valley
- Motto: বাংলাদেশ চিরজীবী হোক
- Location of Rangamati District within Bangladesh
- Expandable map of Rangamati District
- Coordinates: 22°38′N 92°12′E
- Country: Bangladesh
- Division: Chittagong Division
- Capital: Rangamati

Government
  - Type: District Council
  - Body: Rangamati Hill District Council

Area
  - Total: 6,116.11 km^{2} (2,361.44 sq mi)
  - Land: 4,824.63 km^{2} (1,862.80 sq mi)
  - Water: 1,291.5 km^{2} (498.7 sq mi)
  - Rank: 1 (Largest District of Bangladesh)
- Elevation: 17 m (56 ft)

Population (2022)
  - Total: 647,586
  - Rank: 62 (Among 64)
  - Density: 134.225/km^{2} (347.641/sq mi)
- Time zone: UTC+6 (BST)
- Postal Code: 4500
- Area code: 0351
- ISO 3166 code: BD-56
- HDI (2023): 0.630 medium · 21st of 22
- Website: www.rangamati.gov.bd
- Population & Area related info taken from রাঙ্গামাটি জেলা তথ্য বাতায়নে আপনাকে স্বাগতম [Welcome to the Rangamati district portal]. Deputy Commissioner Rangamati (in Bengali). Archived from the original on 17 January 2013.

Rangamati District (Bengali: রাঙ্গামাটি জেলা), officially Rangamati Hill District, is a district in the south-eastern Chittagong Hill Tracts of Bangladesh. It is a part of the Chattogram Division. The city of Rangamati is known as the capital of the Chittagong Hill Tracts. By area, Rangamati is the largest district of the country.

== Geography ==
Rangamati is located in the Chittagong Division. It is bordered by the Tripura state of India to the north, Bandarban District to the south, Mizoram State of India and Chin State of Myanmar to the east, and Khagrachari and Chittagong Districts to the west. Rangamati is the only district in Bangladesh with international borders with two countries: India and Myanmar.

The area of the district is 6,116 km^{2} of which 1,292 km^{2} is riverine and 4,825 km^{2} is under forest vegetation.

== History ==
Rangamati was a contesting ground for the kings of Tripura and Arakan. In 1737, Sher Mosta Khan, a tribal leader, took refuge with the Mughals. Subsequently, the Chakma settlement began along with various other settlements of varying ethnicity. From 1760 to 1761, the area was leased to the East India Company.

== Demography ==
Historical population
Year	Pop.	±% p.a.
1974	202,798	—
1981	301,753	+5.84%
1991	401,388	+2.89%
2001	508,182	+2.39%
2011	595,979	+1.61%
2022	647,586	+0.76%

According to the 2022 Census of Bangladesh, Rangamati Hill District had 153,482 households and a population of 647,586 with an average of 4.15 people per household. Among the population, 119,027 (18.38%) inhabitants were under 10 years of age. The population density was 106 people per km^{2}. The literacy rate (age 7 and over) was 71.41%, compared to the national average of 74.80%. The sex ratio of the district was at 106 males per 100 females. Approximately 47.56% of the population lived in urban areas.

According to the 2022 census, there were a total of 372,875 (57.58%) tribal people in the district. The populations of major ethnic minorities are Chakma 276,048, Marma 51,403, Tanchangya 27,975, Tripura 12,300, Khyang 1,670, and Pankhu 1,398.

Ethnicity in the Rangamati District (2022)
1. Chakma (42.6%)
2. Bengali (42.4%)
3. Marma (7.94%)
4. Tanchangya (4.32%)
5. Tripura (1.90%)
6. Khyang (0.26%)
7. Pankhu (0.22%)
8. Others (0.31%)

Population by ethnicity in Upazila
Upazila	Bengali	Chakma	Marma	Tanchangya	Others
Bagaichhari	28.2 %	66.2%	0.08%	0.01%	5.51%
Barkal	29.0 %	69.3 %	0.88%	0.03%	0.79%
Belaichhari	15.9%	26.7%	8.97%	38.77%	9.66%
Juraichhari	4.65%	91.2%	0.28%	3.33%	0.54%
Kaptai	55.7%	2.25%	28.6%	12.42%	1.03%
Kawkhali	44.9%	25.9%	27.9%	1.02%	0.28%
Langadu	76.5%	23.1%	0.01%	0.01	0.38%
Naniarchar	18.3%	79.9 %	1.74%	0.01%	0.05%
Rajasthali	32.3 %	0.97%	36.6%	16.30%	13.83%
Sadar	52.3%	41.2%	1.89%	2.38%	2.23%

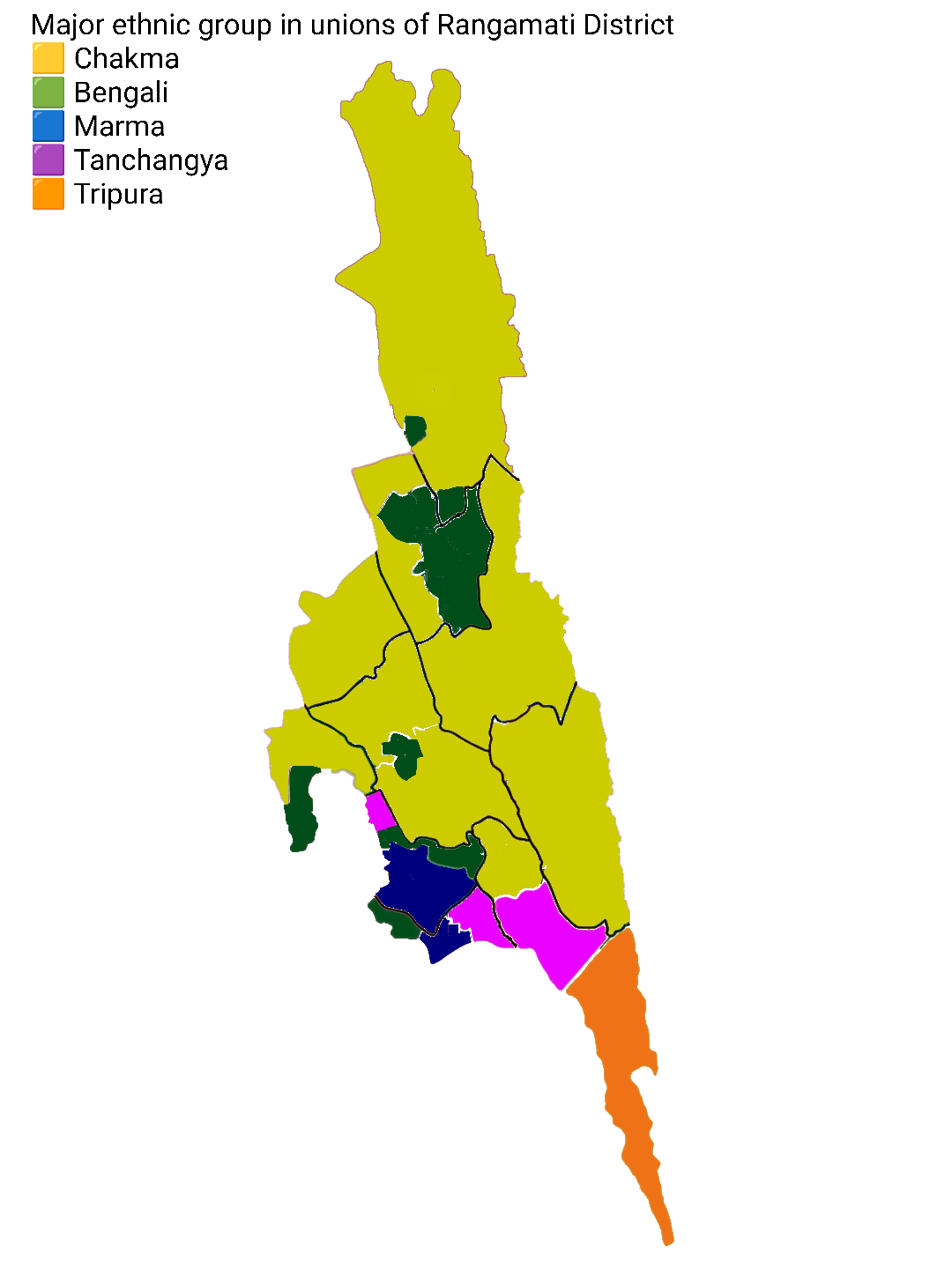
Major ethnic group by unions in Rangamati District

Population by religion in Union
Upazila	Union	Bengali	Chakma	Marma	Tanchangya	Others
Sadar	Rangamati Paurashava	71,741	29,334	1,743	1,208	2,034
Sadar	Balukhali	598	5,684	138	522	1,021
Sadar	Bandukbhanga	93	7,043	8	1	15
Sadar	Jibtali	1,706	1,961	535	250	0
Sadar	Kutukchhari	279	6,310	14	5	42
Sadar	Magban	595	5,087	310	1,497	5
Sadar	Sapchhari	1,696	5,030	17	5	64
Baghaichhari	Baghaichhari Paurashava	13,319	2,223	3	0	99
Baghaichhari	Amtali	5,700	0	0	0	3
Baghaichhari	Baghaichhari	1,670	8,139	12	0	5
Baghaichhari	Bangaltali	2,118	8,684	7	0	7
Baghaichhari	Khedarmara	2,092	8,343	8	1	33
Baghaichhari	Marishya	1,189	4,746	2	0	11
Baghaichhari	Rupakari	515	4,284	1	0	5
Baghaichhari	Sajek	3,198	22,484	31	1	5,671
Baghaichhari	Saroatali	193	11,448	25	10	4
Langadu	Atarakchhara	5,995	7,148	2	2	24
Langadu	Bagachatar	13,248	1,347	1	0	47
Langadu	Bhasanyadam	6,582	908	0	0	2
Langadu	Gulshakhali	10382	986	0	0	260
Langadu	Kalapakujya	8625	0	0	0	0
Langadu	Langadu	6,226	9,595	6	2	5
Langadu	Mainimukh	18,100	904	4	0	5
Barkal	Aimachhara	1,376	6,137	6	4	16
Barkal	Bara Harina	362	5,426	4	0	178
Barkal	Barkal	2,497	4,428	221	4	116
Barkal	Bhushanchhara	6,829	9,985	186	5	41
Barkal	Subalong	3,428	8,486	19	5	48
Kaptai	Chandraghona	8,234	115	326	292	226
Kaptai	Chitmaram	1,323	125	3,441	407	142
Kaptai	Kaptai	11,663	831	715	1,561	142
Kaptai	Raikhali	6,382	126	8,244	1,154	18
Kaptai	Wagga	3,263	49	3,118	3,467	44
Belaichhari	Barathali	582	6	490	1,087	1,430
Belaichhari	Belaichhari	1,335	3,434	556	2,949	389
Belaichhari	Farua	1,326	983	1,012	7,016	1,048
Belaichhari	Kengrachhari	1,445	3,459	592	400	1
Juraichhari	Bonjogichhara	326	4,945	13	4	9
Juraichhari	Dumdumya	234	6,678	33	594	126
Juraichhari	Juraichhari	563	8,761	9	13	23
Juraichhari	Maidang	128	4,164	20	287	2
Kawkhali	Betbunia	12,503	601	6,372	16	27
Kawkhali	Fatikchhari	11	3,278	2,497	2	44
Kawkhali	Ghagra	8,851	12,177	3,290	655	94
Kawkhali	Kalampati	8,394	1,132	6,318	4	44
Naniarchar	Burighat	6,154	6,893	759	0	24
Naniarchar	Ghilachhari	551	8,783	28	1	4
Naniarchar	Naniarchar	1,341	11,619	50	1	19
Naniarchar	Sabekkyong	116	11,471	5	0	2
Rajasthali	Bangalhalia	6,070	133	4,161	274	310
Rajasthali	Gaindya	1,492	76	5,330	1,157	470
Rajasthali	Ghilachhari	1,447	60	722	3,111	3,051

Largest ethnic group in Union and Municipality
Ethnic group	Union	Municipality	Upazila
Bengali	11	2	4
Chakma	32	0	3
Marma	3	0	1
Tanchangya	3	0	1
Tripura	1	0	0
Total	50	2	10

=== Bengalis ===
According to the 2022 census, Bengalis are the second-largest ethnic group in Rangamati Hill District (42.42%), nearly as numerous as Chakma people (42.63%).

By Upazila

Upazila	Population	Percentage of Bengalis
Langadu Upazila	69,160	76.50%
Kaptai Upazila	30,867	55.71%
Rangamati Sadar Upazila	76,718	52.33%
Kawkhali Upazila	29,763	44.88%
Rajasthali Upazila	9,009	32.33%
Barkal Upazila	14,393	28.96%
Bagaichhari Upazila	29,998	28.22%
Naniarchar Upazila	8,864	18.27%
Belaichhari Upazila	4,688	15.87%
Juraichhari Upazila	1,251	4.65%

By Union (Highest 10)

Union	Upazila	Percentage
Kalapakujya Union	Langadu Upazila	100%
Amtali Union	Baghaichhari Upazila	99.95%
Mainimukh Union	Langadu Upazila	95.2%
Bagachatar Union	Langadu Upazila	90.47%
Chandraghona Union	Kaptai Upazila	89.57%
Gulshakhali Union	Langadu Upazila	89.28%
Bhasanyadam Union	Langadu Upazila	87.85%
Kaptai Union	Kaptai Upazila	78.2%
Betbunia Union	Kawkhali Upazila	64%
Bangalhalia Union	Rajasthali Upazila	55.4%

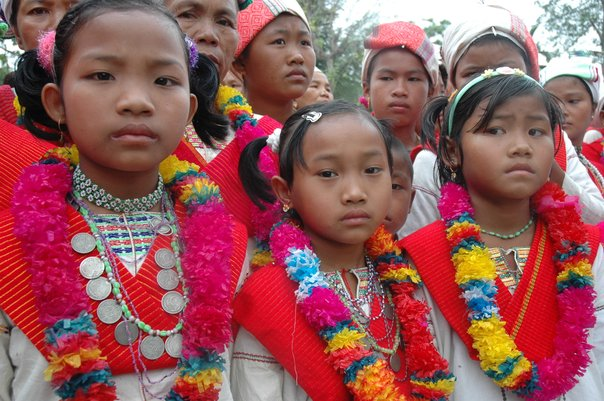
Tribal children, Rangamati

=== Chakmas ===
According to the 2022 census, Chakmas are the largest ethnic group in Rangamati District (42.63%).

By Upazila

Upazila	Population	Percentage of Chakmas
Juraichhari Upazila	24,548	91.15%
Naniarchar Upazila	38,766	79.89%
Barkal Upazila	34,462	69.33%
Bagaichhari Upazila	70,350	66.19%
Rangamati Sadar Upazila	60,449	41.23%
Belaichhari Upazila	7,882	26.68%
Kawkhali Upazila	17,188	25.92%
Langadu Upazila	20,188	23.10%
Kaptai Upazila	1,246	2.25%
Rajasthali Upazila	269	0.97%

By Union (Highest 10)

Union	Upazila	Percentage
Sabekkyong Union	Naniarchar Upazila	98.94%
Bandukbhanga Union	Rangamati Sadar Upazila	98.37%
Saroatali Union	Baghaichhari Upazila	98.01%
Kutukchhari Union	Rangamati Sadar Upazila	94.89%
Ghilachhari Union	Naniarchar Upazila	93.77%
Juraichhari Union	Juraichhari Upazila	93.51%
Bonjogichhara Union	Juraichhari Upazila	93.35%
Bara Harina Union	Barkal Upazila	90.89%
Maidang Union	Juraichhari Upazila	90.5%
Rupakari Union	Baghaichhari Upazila	89.2%

=== Marmas ===
According to the 2022 census, Marmas are the third-largest ethnic group in Rangamati District (7.93%).

By Upazila

Upazila	Population	Percentage of Marmas
Rajasthali Upazila	10,213	36.65%
Kaptai Upazila	15,844	28.59%
Kawkhali Upazila	18,477	27.86%
Belaichhari Upazila	2,650	8.97%
Rangamati Sadar Upazila	2,765	1.89%
Naniarchar Upazila	842	1.74%
Barkal Upazila	436	0.88%
Juraichhari Upazila	75	0.28%
Baghaichhari Upazila	89	0.08%
Langadu Upazila	12	0.01%

By Union (Highest 10)

Union	Upazila	Percentage
Chitmaram Union	Kaptai Upazila	63.28%
Gaindya Union	Rajasthali Upazila	62.52%
Raikhali Union	Kaptai Upazila	51.77%
Fatikchhari Union	Kawkhali Upazila	42.8%
Kalampati Union	Kawkhali Upazila	39.8%
Bangalhalia Union	Rajasthali Upazila	38%
Betbunia Union	Kawkhali Upazila	32.6%
Wagga Union	Kaptai Upazila	31.4%
Ghagra Union	Kawkhali Upazila	13.1%
Jibtali Union	Rangamati Sadar Upazila	12%

=== Tanchangyas ===
According to the 2022 census, Tanchangyas are the fourth-largest ethnic group in Rangamati District (4.32%).

By Upazila

Upazila	Population	Percentage of Tanchangya
Belaichhari Upazila	11,452	38.77%
Rajasthali Upazila	4,542	16.30%
Kaptai Upazila	6,881	12.42%
Juraichhari Upazila	858	3.33%
Rangamati Sadar Upazila	3,488	2.38%
Kaukhali Upazila	677	1.02%
Others	<100	<1%

By Union (Highest 10)

Union	Upazila	Percentage
Farua Union	Belaichhari Upazila	61.62%
Ghilachhari Union	Rajasthali Upazila	37.08%
Wagga Union	Kaptai Upazila	34.88%
Belaichhari Union	Belaichhari Upazila	34.04%
Barathali Union	Belaichhari Upazila	30.24%
Magban Union	Rangamati Sadar Upazila	20%
Gaindya Union	Rajasthali Upazila	13.6%
Kaptai Union	Kaptai Upazila	10.5%
Dumdumya Union	Juraichhari Upazila	7.75%
Raikhali Union	Kaptai Upazila	7.25%

=== Tripuras ===
According to the 2022 census, Tripuras are the fifth-largest ethnic group in Rangamati District (1.90%).

Upazila	Population	Percentage of Tripuras
Rajasthali Upazila	2,273	8.16%
Belaichhari Upazila	1,796	6.08%
Baghaichhari Upazila	5,457	5.13%
Rangamati Sadar Upazila	2,206	1.50%
Others		<1%

=== Khyangs ===
According to the 2022 census, there are 1,670 kyang in Rangamati District.

Upazila	Population	Percentage of Khyangs
Rajasthali Upazila	2,420	5.09%
Kaptai Upazila	250	0.32%
Others	<100	

=== Phankos ===
According to the 2022 census, there are 1,398 Phankos in Rangamati District.

Upazila	Population	Percentage of Phankos
Belaichhari Upazila	498	1.69%
Rangamati Sadar Upazila	228	0.15%
Barkal Upazila	208	0.42%
Kaptai Upazila	143	0.26%
Baghaichhari Upazila	117	0.11%
Juraichhari Upazila	116	0.43%
Others	<100	

== Religion ==
Rangamati is the only Buddhist majority district of Bangladesh. But two towns of Rangamati district, both Rangamati and Baghaichhari, have a Muslim majority. Moreover, Langadu Upazila has a Muslim majority, and Kaptai Upazila has a Muslim plurality. Rangamati Sadar Upazila has a Buddhist plurality, and others have a Buddhist majority.

Religion in the Rangamati District (2022)
1. Buddhism (57.3%)
2. Islam (36.3%)
3. Hinduism (5.11%)
4. Christianity (1.32%)
5. Other (0.05%)

Religion in present-day Rangamati Hill District (Note: Rangamati, Chandragona, Barkal and Langadu thanas of Chittagong Hill Tracts district)
Religion	Population (1941)	Percentage (1941)	Population (2022)	Percentage (2022)
Tribal (Note: 'Tribal' was used as a blanket term for religious traditions of all tribes, and many of these tribes followed a more mainstream religion.)	102,275	93.21%	N/A	N/A
Islam	3,963	3.62%	234,834	36.26%
Hinduism	2,584	2.35%	33,112	5.11%
Christianity	60	0.06%	8,547	1.32%
Buddhism	565	0.51%	370,793	57.26%
Others (Note: Including Jainism, Zoroastrianism, Judaism, Ad-Dharmis, or not stated)	279	0.25%	300	0.05%
Total Population	109,726	100%	647,586	100%

As per the 1991 census, the religious institutions in the district include 1230 pagodas, 1059 mosques, 65 temples, and 16 churches. Genderwise, males constituted 53.59% and females constituted 46.41% of the population.

Population by religion in Upazila
Upazila	Muslim	Buddhist	Christian	Hindu	Others
Bagaichhari	24.74 %	67.99%	0.57%	6.67%	0.03%
Barkal	22.74 %	75.81 %	0.55%	0.87%	0.02%
Belaichhari	10.62%	78.21%	9.60%	1.24%	0.32%
Juraichhari	3.26%	95.60%	0.52%	0.63%	0.00%
Kaptai	47.37%	45.35%	1.02%	6.23%	0.03%
Kawkhali	40.05%	56.76%	0.08%	3.09%	0.01%
Langadu	74.62 %	23.74%	0.40%	1.23%	0.01%
Naniarchar	14.85%	83.18 %	0.08%	1.87%	0.03%
Rajasthali	21.92 %	58.48%	10.83%	8.77%	0.00%
Sadar	40.69%	48.50%	0.45%	10.29%	0.08%

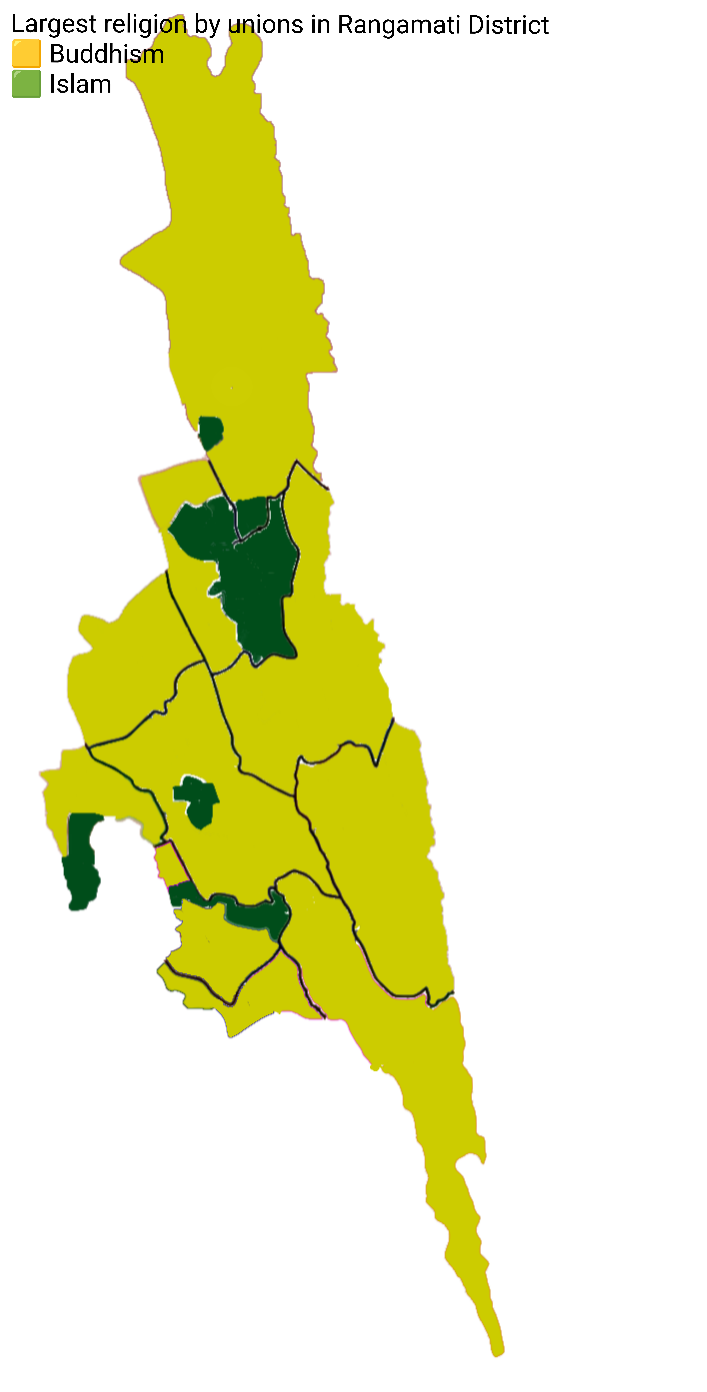
Largest religion by unions in Rangamati District

Population by religion in Union
Upazila	Union	Muslim	Buddhist	Others
Sadar	Rangamati Paurashava	55,277	36,362	14,430
Sadar	Balukhali	512	6,422	1,039
Sadar	Bandukbhanga	31	7,119	11
Sadar	Jibtali	1,524	2,805	123
Sadar	Kutukchhari	128	6,389	133
Sadar	Magban	565	6,913	16
Sadar	Sapchhari	1,608	5,090	114
Baghaichhari	Baghaichhari Paurashava	12,436	2,445	763
Baghaichhari	Amtali	5,642	51	10
Baghaichhari	Baghaichhari	1,621	8,176	28
Baghaichhari	Bangaltali	441	10,051	283
Baghaichhari	Khedarmara	1,469	8,487	520
Baghaichhari	Marishya	1,185	4,753	9
Baghaichhari	Rupakari	470	4,310	22
Baghaichhari	Sajek	2,895	22,460	5,808
Baghaichhari	Saroatali	129	11,532	15
Barkal	Aimachhara	1,095	6,386	58
Barkal	Bara Harina	120	5,560	190
Barkal	Barkal	1,890	5,181	195
Barkal	Bhushanchhara	5,716	11,213	117
Barkal	Subalong	2,484	9,345	157
Belaichhari	Barathali	336	1,731	1,528
Belaichhari	Belaichhari	926	7,124	613
Belaichhari	Farua	503	9,735	1,147
Belaichhari	Kengrachhari	1,362	4,514	11
Juraichhari	Bonjogichhara	251	5,011	35
Juraichhari	Dumdumya	164	7,351	150
Juraichhari	Juraichhari	351	8,899	119
Juraichhari	Maidang	111	4,486	4
Kaptai	Chandraghona	6,909	988	1,296
Kaptai	Chitmaram	1172	4,065	201
Kaptai	Kaptai	10,340	3,237	1,335
Kaptai	Raikhali	5,490	9,771	663
Kaptai	Wagga	2,333	7,069	539
Kawkhali	Betbunia	10,939	7,619	961
Kawkhali	Fatikchhari	2	5,793	36
Kawkhali	Ghagra	7,708	16,655	704
Kawkhali	Kalampati	7,908	7,574	401
Langadu	Atarakchhara	5,936	7,147	88
Langadu	Bagachatar	12,833	1,610	200
Langadu	Bhasanyadam	6,364	1,063	65
Langadu	Gulshakhali	10,349	985	294
Langadu	Kalapakujya	8,623	0	2
Langadu	Langadu	5,925	9,682	237
Langadu	Mainimukh	17,435	972	606
Naniarchar	Burighat	5,928	7,842	60
Naniarchar	Ghilachhari	188	9,147	32
Naniarchar	Naniarchar	1,061	11,816	853
Naniarchar	Sabekkyong	24	11,555	15
Rajasthali	Bangalhalia	3,934	5,157	1,857
Rajasthali	Gaindya	1,236	6,740	549
Rajasthali	Ghilachhari	937	4,397	3,057

Largest Religion in Union and Municipality
Religion	Union	Municipality	Upazila
Islam	10	2	2
Buddhism	40	0	8
Total	50	2	10

=== Buddhism ===
According to the 2022 census, Buddhism is the largest religion in Rangamati Hill District (57.25%).

By Upazila

Upazila	Population	Percentage of Buddhism
Juraichhari Upazila	25,747	95.60%
Naniarchar Upazila	40,362	83.18%
Belaichhari Upazila	23,104	78.21%
Barkal Upazila	37,686	75.81%
Bagaichhari Upazila	72,267	67.99%
Rajasthali Upazila	16,294	58.48%
Kaukhali Upazila	37,641	56.76%
Rangamati Sadar Upazila	71,100	48.50%
Kaptai Upazila	25,131	45.35%
Langadu Upazila	21,461	23.74%

By Union (Highest 10)

Union	Upazila	Percentage
Sabekkyong Union	Naniarchar Upazila	99.66%
Bandukbhanga Union	Rangamati Sadar Upazila	99.41%
Fatikchhari Union	Kawkhali Upazila	99.35%
Saroatali Union	Baghaichhari Upazila	98.73%
Ghilachhari Union	Naniarchar Upazila	97.65%
Maidang Union	Juraichhari Upazila	97.5%
Kutukchhari Union	Rangamati Sadar Upazila	96.08%
Dumdumya Union	Juraichhari Upazila	95.9%
Juraichhari Union	Juraichhari Upazila	95%
Bara Harina Union	Barkal Upazila	94.8%

=== Islam ===
According to the 2022 census, Islam is the second-largest religion in Rangamati district(36.26%).

By Upazila

Upazila	Population	Percentage of Islam
Langadu Upazila	67,465	74.62%
Kaptai Upazila	26,245	47.37%
Rangamati Sadar Upazila	59,645	40.69%
Kaukhali Upazila	26,561	40.05%
Bagaichhari Upazila	26,291	24.74%
Barkal Upazila	11,305	22.74%
Rajasthali Upazila	6,107	21.92%
Naniarchar Upazila	7,201	14.84%
Belaichhari Upazila	3,137	10.62%
Juraichhari Upazila	877	3.26%

By Union (Highest 10)

Union	Upazila	Percentage
Kalapakujya Union	Langadu Upazila	100%
Amtali Union	Baghaichhari Upazila	98.9%
Mainimukh Union	Langadu Upazila	91.7%
Bagachatar Union	Langadu Upazila	87.6%
Chandraghona Union	Kaptai Upazila	75.2%
Gulshakhali Union	Langadu Upazila	89%
Bhasanyadam Union	Langadu Upazila	85%
Kaptai Union	Kaptai Upazila	69.3%
Betbunia Union	Kawkhali Upazila	56%
Kalampati Union	Kawkhali Upazila	49.8%

=== Hinduism ===
According to the 2022 census, Hinduism is the third-largest religion in Rangamati district(5.11%).

By Upazila

Upazila	Population	Percentage of Hinduism
Rangamati Sadar Upazila	15,086	10.29%
Rajasthali Upazila	2445	8.77%
Baghaichhari Upazila	7,089	6.67%
Kaptai Upazila	3,452	6.23%
Kaukhali Upazila	2,051	3.09%
Naniarchar Upazila	906	1.87%
Belaichhari Upazila	367	1.24%
Langadu Upazila	1,113	1.23%
Barkal Upazila	434	0.87%
Juraichhari Upazila	169	0.63%

By Union (Highest 10)

Union	Upazila	Percentage
Sajek Union	Baghaichhari Upazila	17.6%
Bangalhalia Union	Rajasthali Upazila	15.2%
Balukhali Union	Rangamati Sadar Upazila	11.5%
Chandraghona Union	Kaptai Upazila	10.3%
Kaptai Union	Kaptai Upazila	8.13%
Ghilachhari Union	Rajasthali Upazila	7.13%
Wagga Union	Kaptai Upazila	5.37%
Khedarmara Union	Baghaichhari Upazila	4.95%
Betbunia Union	Kawkhali Upazila	4.86%
Raikhali Union	Kaptai Upazila	4.02%

=== Christianity ===
According to the 2022 census, Christianity is the fourth-largest religion in Rangamati district(1.32%).

Upazila	Population	Percentage of Christianity
Rajasthali Upazila	3,017	10.83%
Belaichhari Upazila	2,837	9.60%
Kaptai Upazila	564	1.02%
Baghaichhari Upazila	604	0.57%
Barkal Upazila	272	0.55%
Juraichhari Upazila	139	0.52%
Rangamati Sadar Upazila	657	0.45%
Langadu Upazila	361	0.40%
Kaukhali Upazila	55	0.08%
Naniarchar Upazila	41	0.08%

By Union (Highest 10)

Union	Upazila	Percentage
Barathali Union	Belaichhari Upazila	39.5%
Ghilachhari Union	Rajasthali Upazila	29.3%
Farua Union	Belaichhari Upazila	9.18%
Belaichhari Union	Belaichhari Upazila	4.26%
Gaindya Union	Rajasthali Upazila	4.25%
Chandraghona Union	Kaptai Upazila	3.75%
Gulshakhali Union	Langadu Upazila	2.25%
Bara Harina Union	Barkal Upazila	2.97%
Bangalhalia Union	Rajasthali Upazila	1.79%
Dumdumya Union	Juraichhari Upazila	1.63%

== Administration ==
District Administration is the apex office of a district at the present context of administrative setting of Bangladesh. It is the management of affairs within a district, which is the basic territorial unit of administration in the country. It is at this level that the common man comes into direct contact with the administration. The district falls under the charge of a district officer, called either Deputy Commissioner or District Collector or District Magistrate. This officer acts as the representative of the central government at this level. Like other district administrations of the country, District Administration Rangamati, widely known as the Office of the Deputy Commissioner is the representative of the cabinet in the Rangamati Hill District.

- Chakma King: Debashish Roy

== Education ==
There are 291 government primary schools, 120 non-government primary schools, 22 junior schools, 6 government high schools, 45 non-government high schools, 2 government colleges, 13 non-government colleges, 61 madrasas, 7 technical schools, 1 University and 1 Medical College.

Renowned Institutes are

- Rangamati Medical College
- Rangamati Science and Technology University
- Bangladesh Sweden Polytechnic Institute
- Rangamati Government High School
- Lakers' Public School and College
- Kaptai High School

== Subdistricts ==
The district of Rangamati consists of 10 upazilas, 2 municipalities (18 wards), 50 union parishads, 162 mouzas, and 1347 villages.

=== Upazilas ===
Rangamati District upazila geocode map

- Rangamati Sadar Upazila
- Belaichhari Upazila
- Bagaichhari Upazila
- Barkal Upazila
- Juraichhari Upazila
- Rajasthali Upazila
- Kaptai Upazila
- Langadu Upazila
- Naniarchar Upazila
- Kaukhali Upazila

== Economy ==
The economy of Rangamati is hugely dependent on agriculture, with a total of 41.94% of the population employed there. Other occupational percentages are: agricultural labourer 12.06%, wage labourer 4.95%, commerce 8.22%, service 13.04%, fishing 2.02%, industry 4.57%, forestry 3.2%, and others 10%. A grand total of 12275 hectares of land is used for cultivation, producing food and non-food crops such as rice, potatoes, corn, mustard seed, cotton, and jute, among others. Fruits such as mango, jackfruit, banana, pineapple, litchi, and blackberry are also grown in Rangamati.

Notable cottage industries of Rangamati are weaving, blacksmithing, and woodwork. Weaving is particularly famous for their woolen and jute rugs and hand loom cloth. Major industries include the Chandraghona paper and rayon mills, a plywood factory, Ghagra Textile, and a satellite station at Betbunia, amongst many others, producing and exporting goods.

== Tourism ==
=== Kaptai lake ===
Kaptai Lake is a man made lake in south-eastern Bangladesh. It is located in the Kaptai Upazila under Rangamati District of Chittagong Division. The lake was created as a result of building the Kaptai Dam on the Karnaphuli River, as part of the Karnaphuli Hydro-electric Project. The Kaptai Lake's average depth is 100 feet (30 m) and its maximum depth is 490 feet (150 m). This lake was developed by inundating valleys and plain lands between the many hills.

=== Hanging Bridge ===
In Bengali, the name of the Hanging Bridge is Jhulonto Bridge, and this is also popular with its visitors. This hanging bridge is established on Kaptai Lake. This is the link way of Kaptai Lake. The total height of this bridge is 335 feet, and is the landmark icon of Rangamati.

=== Kaptai National Park ===
Kaptai National Park cascades between the Karnaphuly and Kaptai Mountain assortments. It was conventional in 1999, and its area is 5,464.78 hectares (13,503.8 acres). Prior to the announcement of the national park, it was the Sitapahar Reserve. It is about 57 kilometres from Chittagong city. In this park one can find plenty of old trees, which were planted in 1873. In Kaptai National Park, there is various wildlife, such as deer, jungle cats, elephants, monkeys, etc. Many species of birds may also be of interest to tourists and bird lovers. Kaptai National Park is a safe sanctuary for birds and other wildlife. The Forest Division founded picnic spots and restaurants in this park.

=== Shuvolong Waterfalls ===
Shuvolong is a place in Barkol sub district, located about 25 kilometres (11 kilometres as the crow flies) away from Rangamati town. There are few waterfalls in the Shuvolong area, with the largest one falling from as high as 300 feet. In the past several years, this place has turned into a tourist destination due to its waterfalls and nearby market. Shuvolong is accessible by speedboat or motorboat from Rangamati.

=== Sajek valley ===
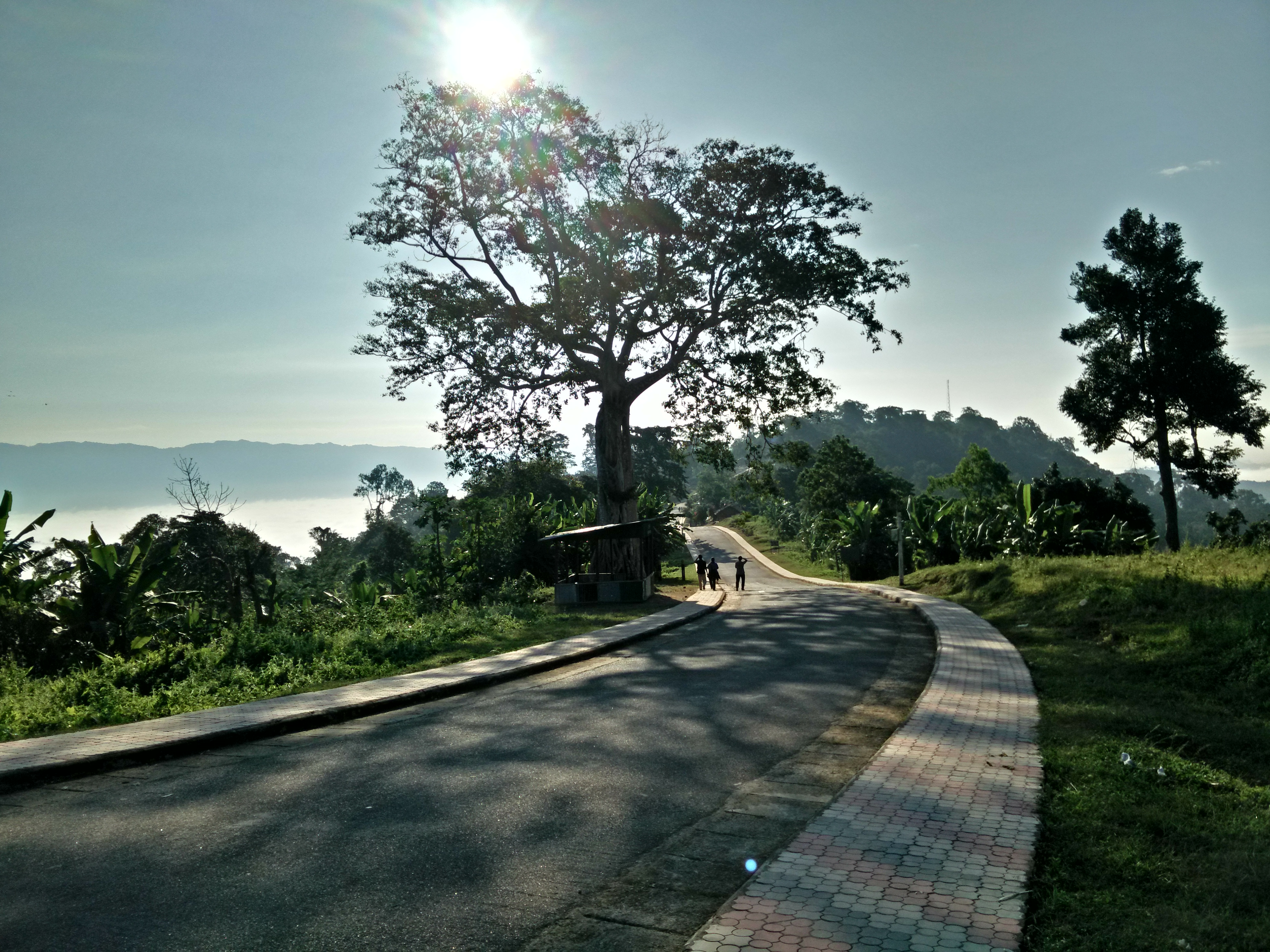
A view of Sajek.

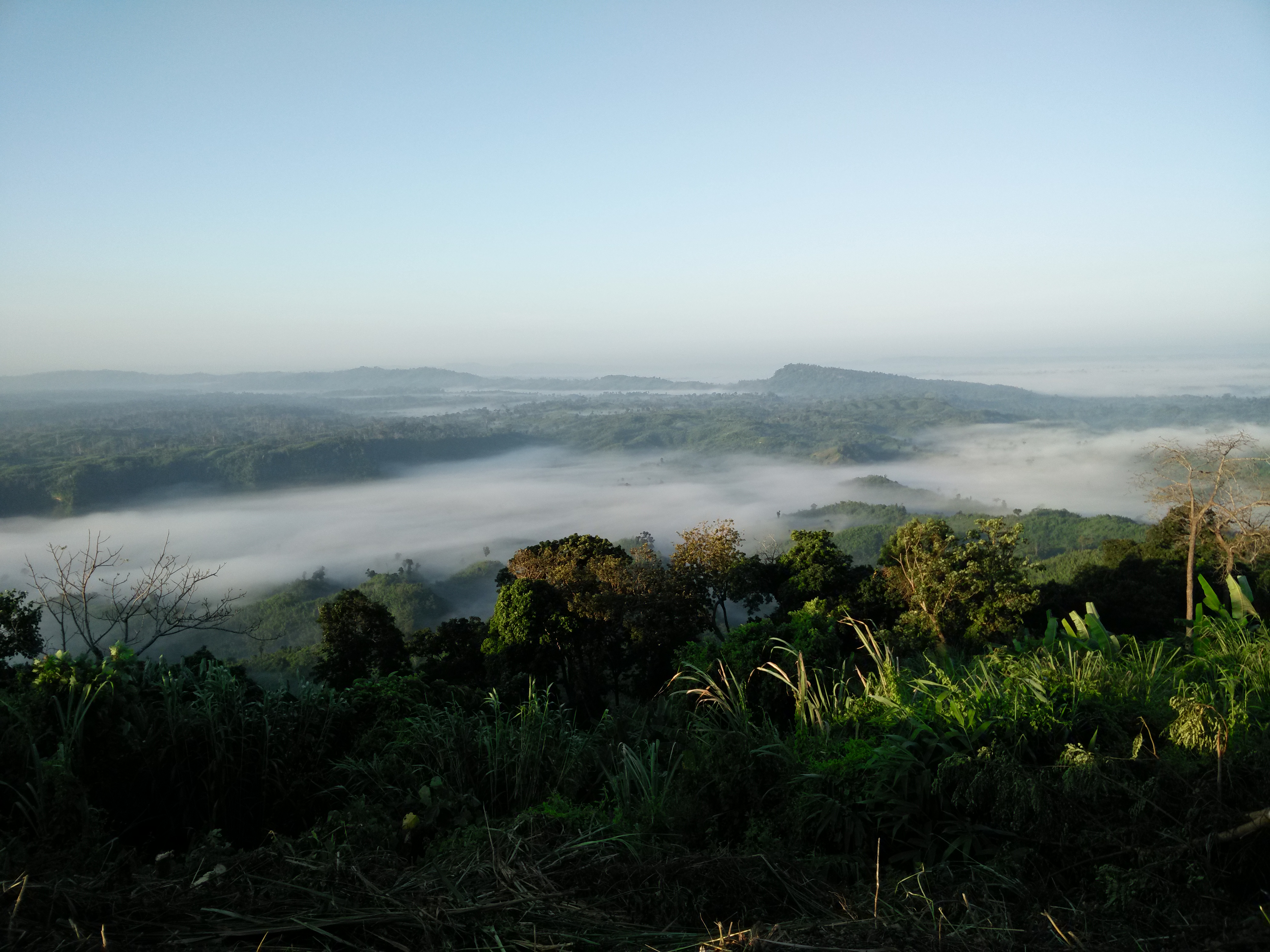
View over the mountains, from Sajek

Sajek is a union at Baghaichari Upazila in Rangamati district. Basically, it is the name of a river that separates Bangladesh from India. The river flows into the Karnafuli River in the Chittagong Hill Tracts. Sajek Valley is situated in the North angle of Rangamati, near the Mizoram border boundary area. The valley is 1,800 ft above sea level. Many small rivers flow through the hills – including the rivers Kachalon and Machalong. The main ethnic minorities in the valley are Chakma, Marma, Tripura, Pankua, and Lushai. Marishsha is the name of a place near Sajek Valley. Most of the houses are made with bamboo. There is another place near Sajek, it is Kanlak, and it is known for its orange orchard.

Most attractions of the spot are sunset, rain, morning, evening, night, and aboriginal people. Tourists can buy indigenous peoples' products from haat (markets). Roads are like big snake spirals on the mountains. Most of the people are Buddhist, and others are Christian here. A new road has been built up to the Ruilui Para under the guidance of the Bangladesh army. On the way, the traveller needs to take permission from the army camp. The Bangladesh army is very helpful and cooperative. Now mobile network is available here. The valley is in Rangamati, but tourists can reach there from Khagrachhari, too. The route is Khagrachhori – Dighinala Bazaar – Bagaihat Bazaar – Machalong Haat – then Sajek. It is 62 km from Khagrachhari. Dighinala to Sajek is 40 km. Main transportation is Chander Gari.

There is another tourist destination that is popular among tourists named "Konglak Haphong" which is the highest peak of the Sajek Valley.

== Notable people ==
- Kamrul Islam (footballer)
- Russel Mahmud Liton
- Shahajuddin Tipu
- Alamgir Kabir (film maker)
- Mumtaheena Toya
- Zahed Ur Rahman
- Firoja Begum Chino
- Kanak Chanpa Chakma
- Monjulika Chakma
- Parijat Kusum Chakma
- Ritu Porna Chakma
- Suro Krishna Chakma
- Rupna Chakma
- Sudipta Dewan
- Subimal Dewan
- Dipen Dewan (Politician)
- Moni Swapan Dewan
- Kamini Mohan Dewan
- Binoy Kumar Dewan
- Barun Bikash Dewan
- Ushatan Talukder
- Dipankar Talukdar
- Jyotirindra Bodhipriya Larma
- Manabendra Narayan Larma
- Devasish Roy
- Tridev Roy
- Chandra Kalindi Roy Henriksen
- Chinghla Mong Chowdhury Mari
- Prajnananda Mahathera
- Chaithoai Roaza
- Puskar Khisa
- Shobha Rani Tripura
- Naba Bikram Kishore Tripura
- Mitul Marma
- Gyorvati Tanchangya
- Selina Akhter

== Gallery ==
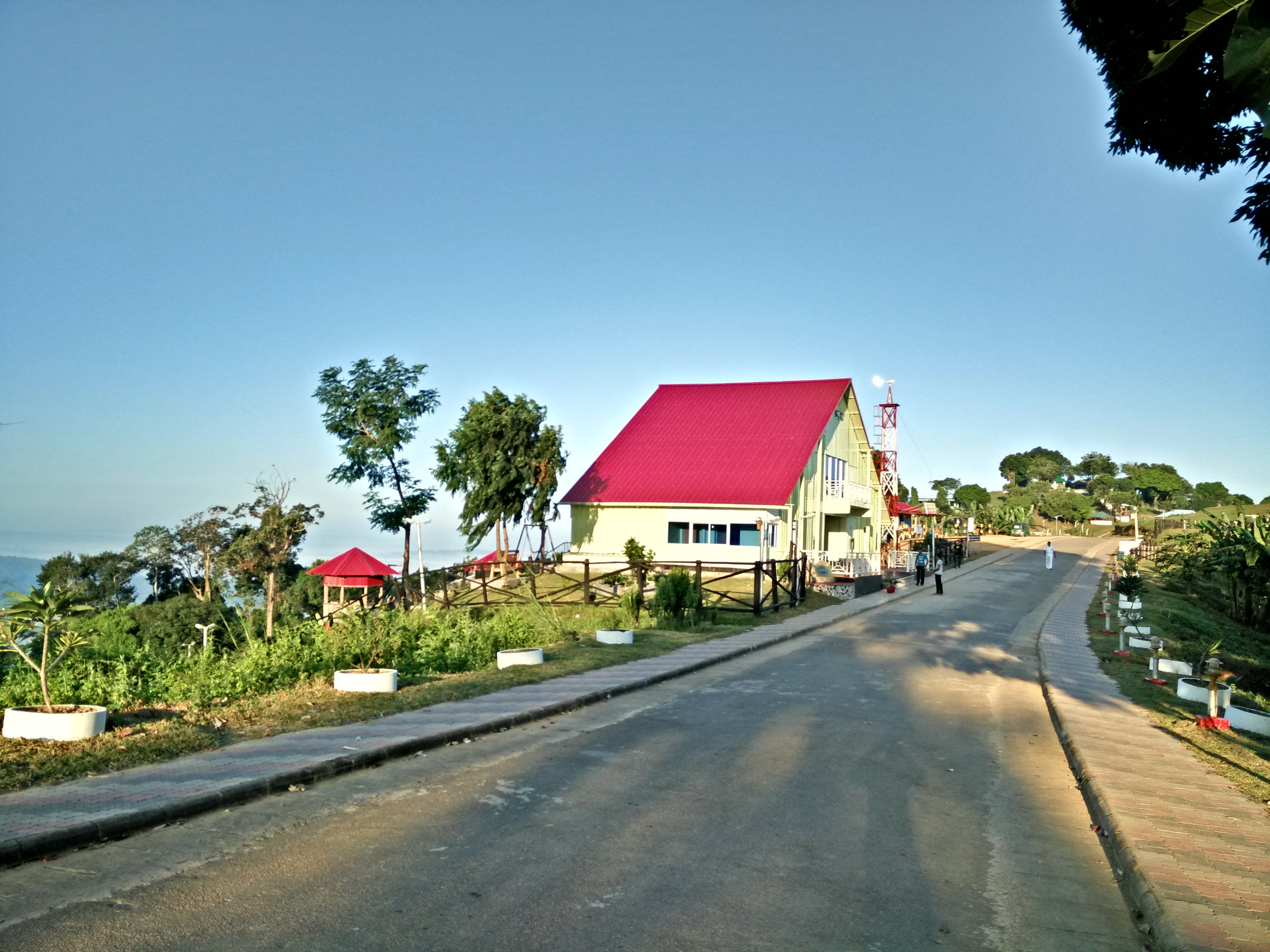
A resort at Sajek union, Rangamati

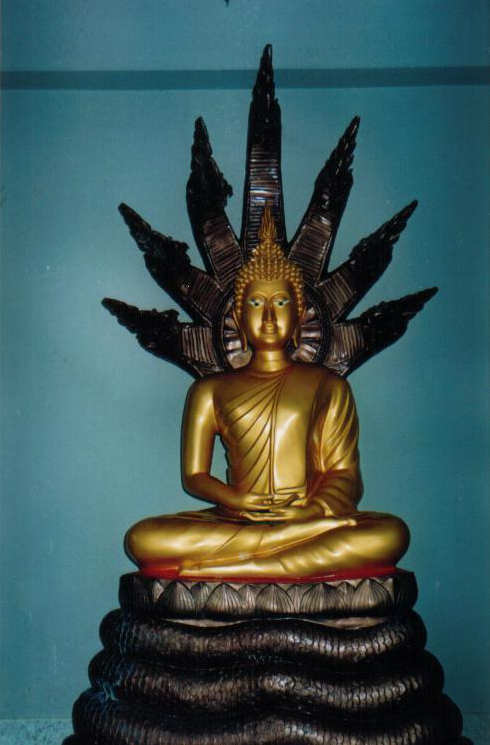
Statue of sitting Buddha, Rangamati

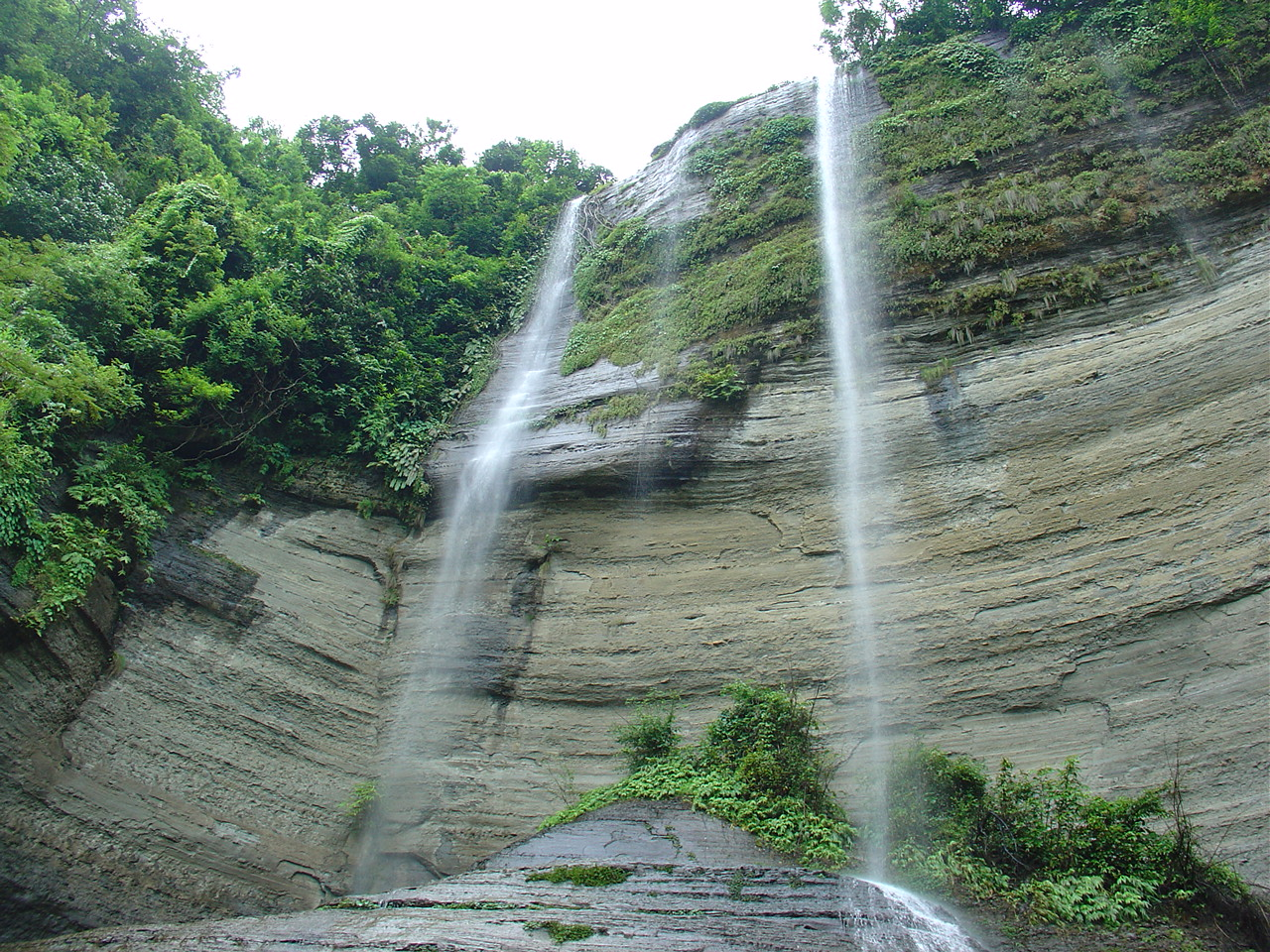
Shubhalang waterfall

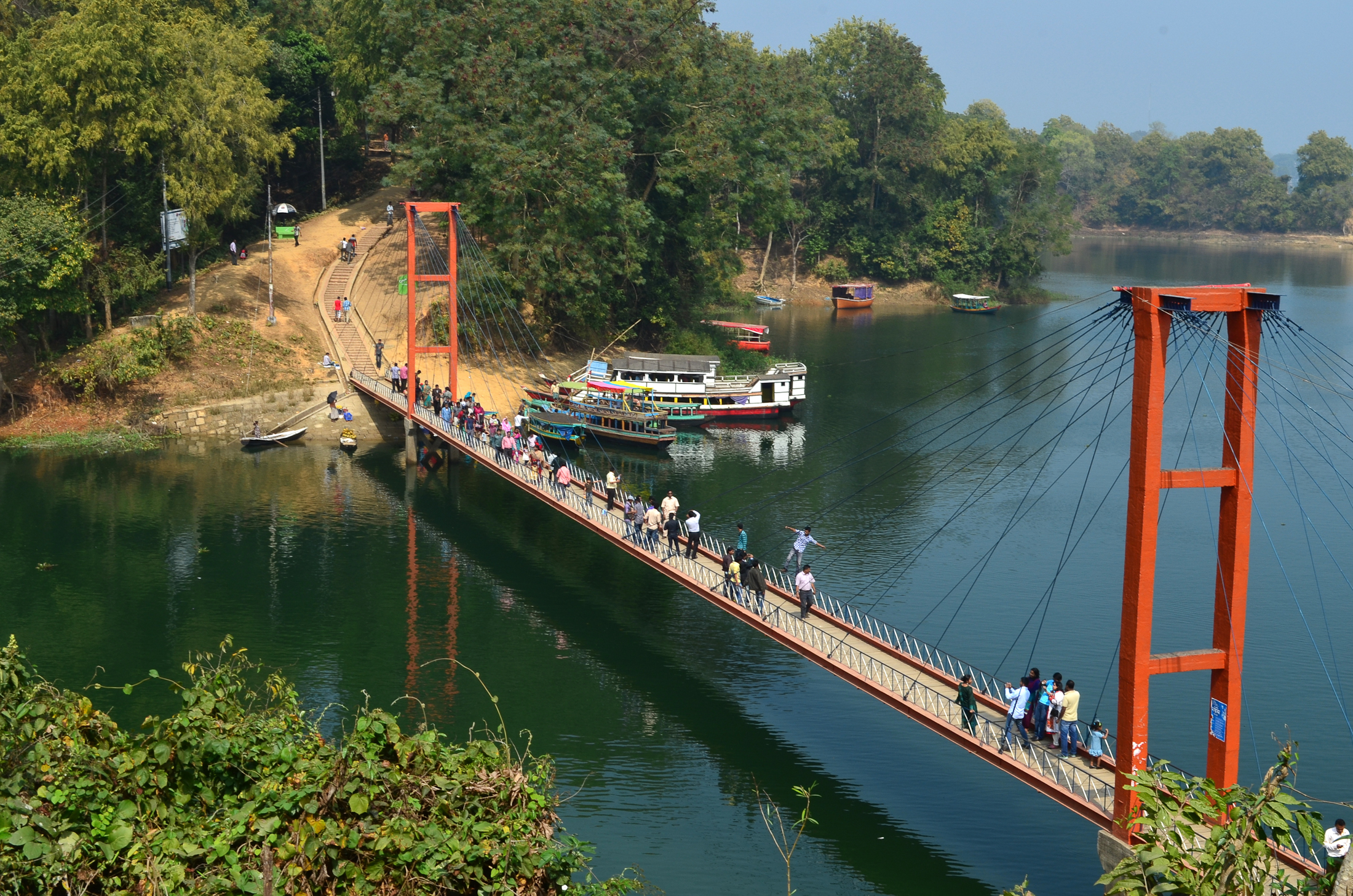
The Hanging Bridge

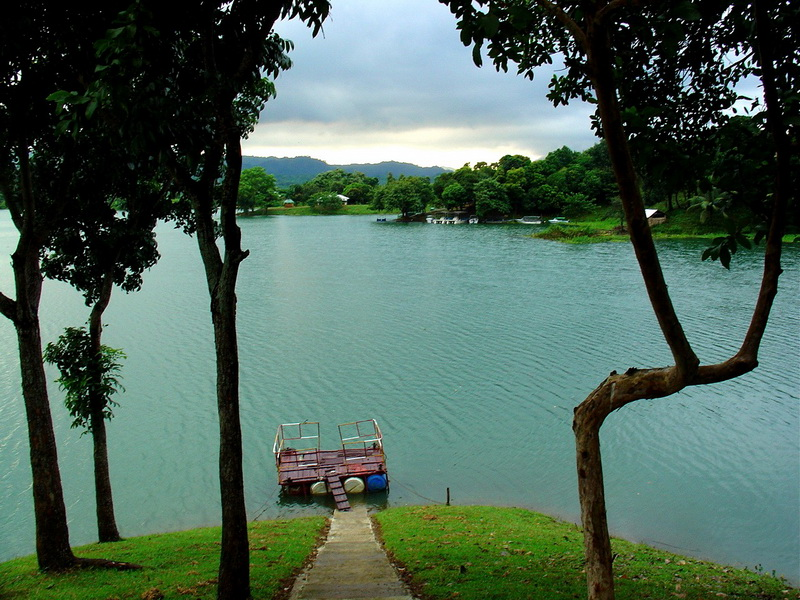
Lake surrounded by hills during winter

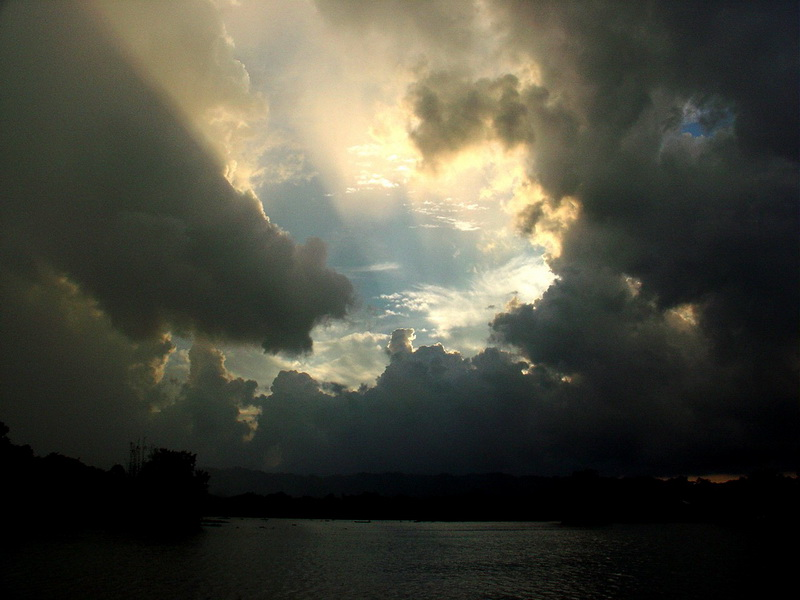
Sun Rays Through The Clouds

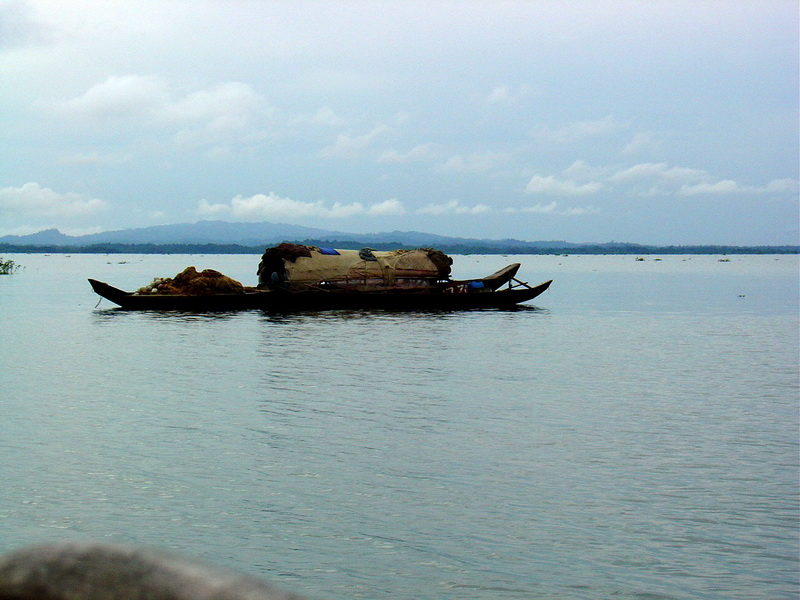
Fishing boat of the Rangamati locals

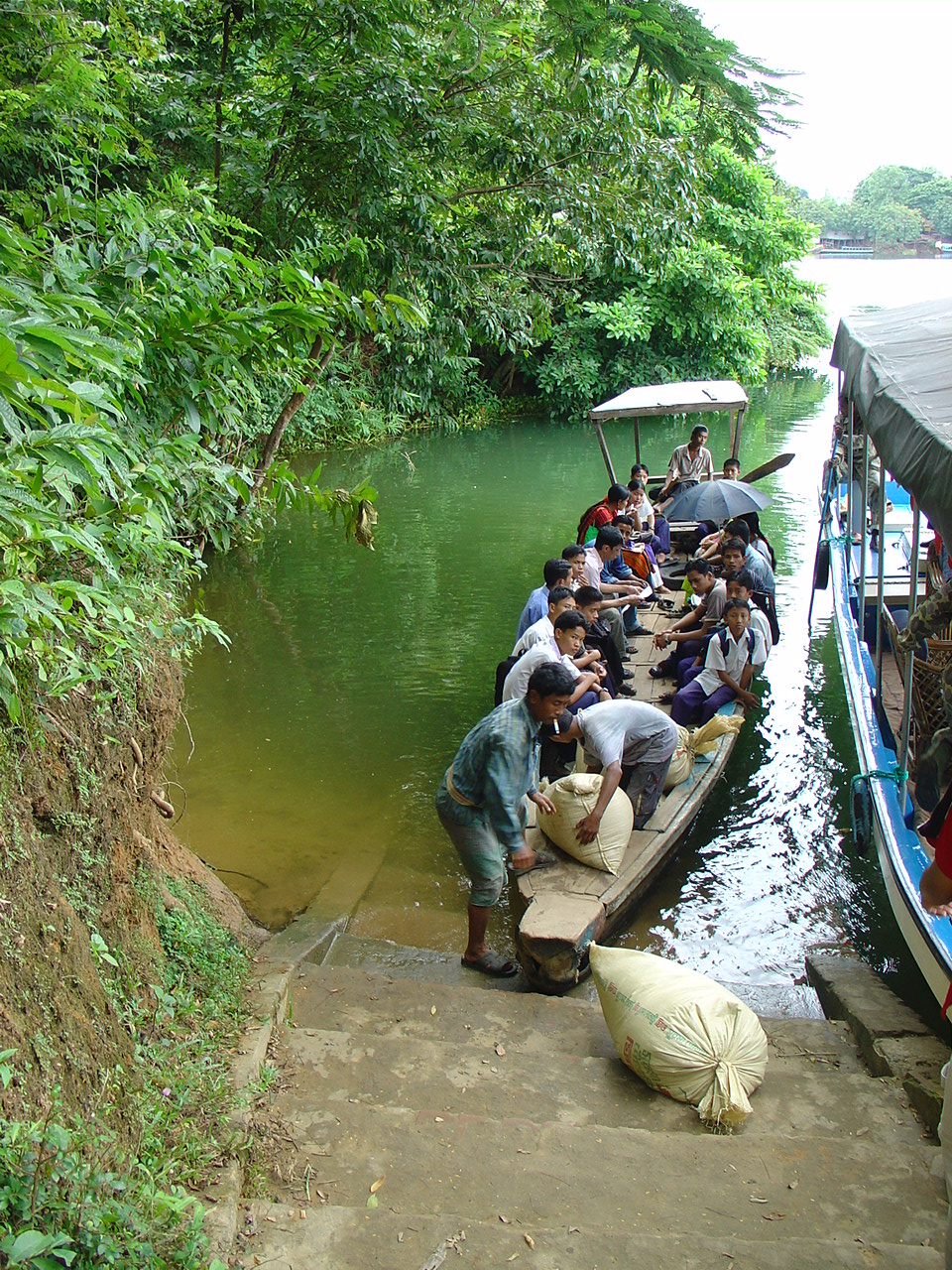
Local People using boats for transportation

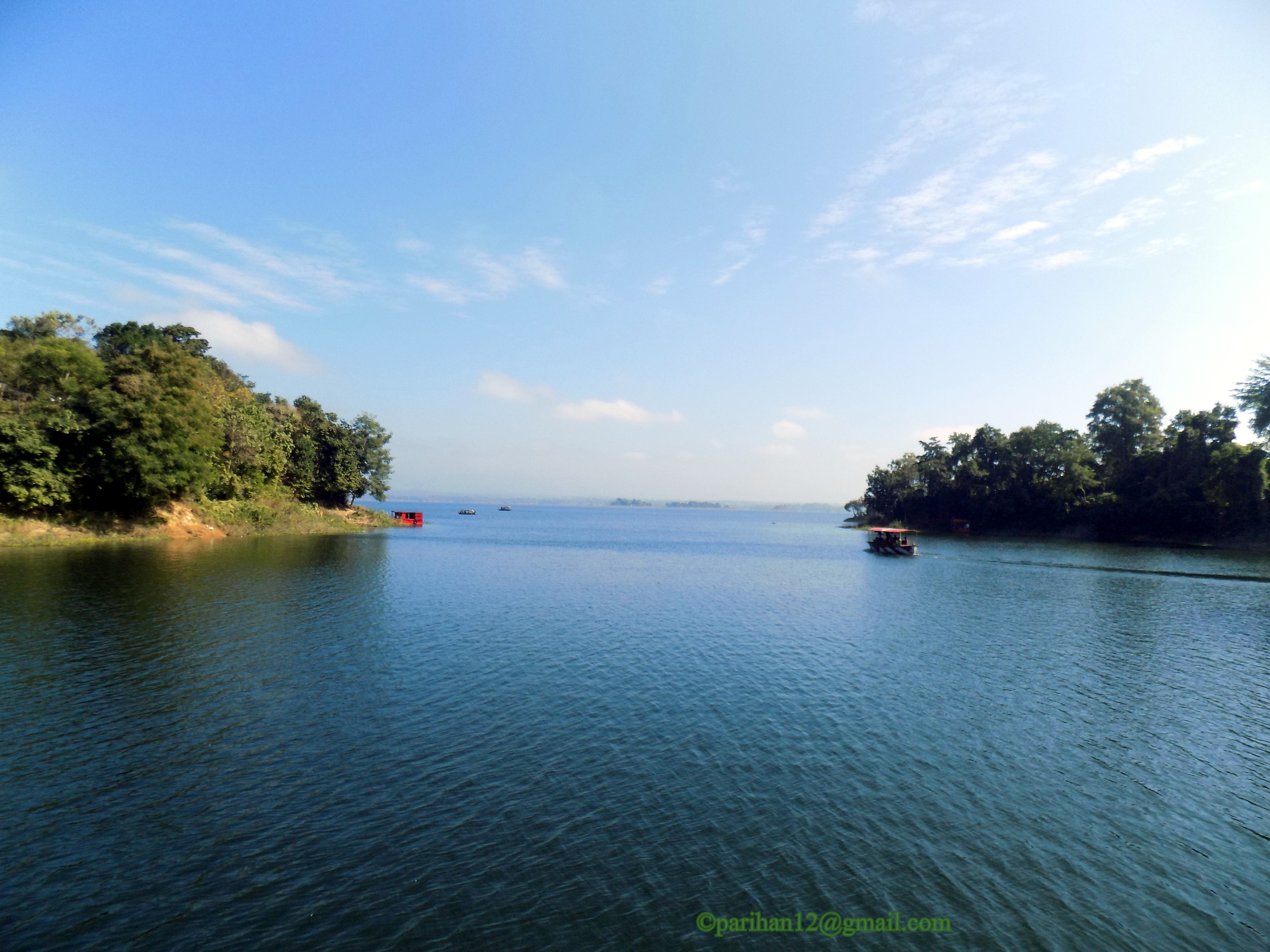
Kaptai Lake view

== See also ==
- Chittagong Hill Tracts
- Upazilas of Bangladesh
- Districts of Bangladesh
- Divisions of Bangladesh
- Upazila
- Thana
