= Chandraghona (disambiguation) =

Chandraghona may refer to:

- Chandraghona, a town in Bangladesh
- Chandraghona Union, a union of Rangamati District
