= Betbunia Union =

Union of Rangamati District, Chittagong, Bangladesh

Betbunia বেতবুনিয়া
- Union
- Interactive map of Betbunia
- Country: Bangladesh
- Division: Chittagong Division
- District: Rangamati District
- Upazila: Kawkhali Upazila

Area
  - Total: 80.29 km^{2} (31.00 sq mi)

Population (2022)
  - Total: 19,519
  - Density: 243.1/km^{2} (629.6/sq mi)
- Time zone: UTC+6 (BST)
- Postal code: 4511
- Website: betbuniaup.rangamati.gov.bd

Betbunia Union is a union of Kawkhali Upazila under Rangamati District.

== Demography ==
According to 2022 census, total population of the Union are 19,519. Among them, 10,939 are Muslim, 7,619 are Buddhist, 948 are Hindu, 10 are Christian and 3 follow others religion.

Religion-2022
1. Islam (56.0%)
2. Buddhism (39.0%)
3. Hinduism (4.86%)
4. Christianity (0.05%)
5. Others (0.02%)

== Ethnicity ==
This Union is home to a variety of different ethnic groups. Among them, 12,503 are Bengali, 6,372 are Marma, 601 are Chakma and 43 are of others ethnic groups.

Ethnicity-2022
1. Bengali (64.0%)
2. Marma (32.6%)
3. Chakma (3.08%)
4. Others (0.22%)
