= Chitmaram Union =

Union of Rangamati District, Chittagong, Bangladesh

Chitmaram চিৎমরম
- Union
- Interactive map of Chitmaram
- Country: Bangladesh
- Division: Chittagong Division
- District: Rangamati District
- Upazila: Kaptai Upazila

Area
  - Total: 28.49 km^{2} (11.00 sq mi)

Population (2022)
  - Total: 5,438
  - Density: 190.9/km^{2} (494.4/sq mi)
- Time zone: UTC+6 (BST)
- Postal code: 4530
- Website: chitmoromup.rangamati.gov.bd

Chitmaram Union is a union of Kaptai Upazila under Rangamati District.

== Demography ==
According to 2022 census, total population of the Union are 5,438. Among them, 1,172 are Muslim, 4,065 are Buddhist, 121 are Hindu, 79 are Christian and 1 follow others religion.

Religion-2022
1. Buddhism (74.8%)
2. Islam (21.6%)
3. Hinduism (2.23%)
4. Christianity (1.45%)
5. Others (0.02%)

== Ethnicity ==
This Union is home to a variety of different ethnic groups. Among them, 1,323 are Bengali, 3,441 are Marma, 407 are Tanchangya, 125 are Chakma and 142 are of others ethnic groups.

Ethnicity-2022
1. Marma (63.3%)
2. Bengali (24.3%)
3. Tanchangya (7.48%)
4. Chakma (2.30%)
5. Others (2.61%)
