= Khyang people =

Indigenous people live in Bangladesh

Total population
- ~4,826

Regions with significant populations
- Bangladesh: 4,826
- Myanmar: Unknown

Languages
- Asho Khyang

Religion
- Theravada Buddhism (61.71 %), Christianity (38.29 %)

Related ethnic groups
- Chin peoples

The Kheyang, also known as Asho Khyang or Hyow (Bengali: খিয়াং) are a group of indigenous people inhabiting in the Chittagong Hill Tracts of Bangladesh and the Rakhine State of Myanmar. Kheyang is the exonym of the Hyow. They are part of the broader Zo peoples. The Khyang are one of the smallest ethnic groups in Bangladesh with a population of only 4,826 according to the 2022 census.

== Etymology ==
The word "Kheyang" is originated from the term "khlɔng", which means person in the language. The endonym Hyow means Chin.

== History ==
According to Kheyang chronicles, the Khyangs with their king entered Chittagong Hill Tracts when their kingdom in Burma was overrun by the Burmese. But afterwards the king decided to go back to Burma. But his younger queen being pregnant could not accompany him. Hence she was left behind with some followers and kinsmen. The present Kheyang are the descendants of this queen and her retinue. However, the literature of the Burmese history tells that the Kheyang migrated with the Marma from the southern Myanmar in the late eighteenth century. The Kheyang have two groups in Bangladesh: Laitu and Kongtu. The Kheyang were Buddhists but many converted to Christianity during the British period. Most Khyang today are under the Mong family or the "Royal Family" which is from Chandraghona, Rangamati Hill Districts in Bangladesh.

== Geographical distribution ==
According to the 2022 Bangladeshi census, there are 4,826 Khyang in Bangladesh. Among them, 2,502 in Bandarban District and 1,670 in Rangamati District.

Upazila	District	Population	Percentage who are Khyang
Rajasthali Upazila	Rangamati District	1,420	5.10%
Bandarban Sadar Upazila	Bandarban District	1,310	1.18%
Rowangchhari Upazila	Bandarban District	652	2.35%
Thanchi Upazila	Bandarban District	359	1.21%
Kaptai Upazila	Rangamati District	177	0.32%
Ruma Upazila	Bandarban District	158	0.49%
Others		<100	

== Social system ==
Every Khyang society has a leader who is called 'Karbari' or 'Headman'. Kheyang society has a patriarchal structure. The father of a family is the master of the house. If a village lacks a headman, the villagers unitedly appoint a leader. The leader solves all the disputes that may develop among the villagers and, thus, helps them live in peace. If a person is accused of any criminal wrongdoing, the headman takes steps in line with customary social laws.

The accused is generally punished or forgiven, and the judgement is passed in front of all after measuring the enormity of the misdeed. Both the male and female of the Kheyang community are very industrious. Men dominate and especially follow the laws of society.

== See also ==
- Persecution of Buddhists in Bangladesh
- Tribal people in Chittagong Hill Tracts
