= Wagga Union =

Union of Rangamati District, Chittagong, Bangladesh

Wagga ওয়াজ্ঞা
- Union
- Interactive map of Wagga
- Country: Bangladesh
- Division: Chittagong Division
- District: Rangamati District
- Upazila: Kaptai Upazila

Area
  - Total: 49.21 km^{2} (19.00 sq mi)

Population (2022)
  - Total: 9,941
  - Density: 202.0/km^{2} (523.2/sq mi)
- Time zone: UTC+6 (BST)
- Postal code: 4530
- Website: waggaup.rangamati.gov.bd

Wagga Union is a union of Kaptai Upazila under Rangamati District.

== Demography ==
According to 2022 census, total population of the Union are 9,941. Among them, 2,333 are Muslim, 7,069 are Buddhist, 504 are Hindu, 4 are Christian and 1 follow others religion.

Religion-2022
1. Buddhism (71.1%)
2. Islam (23.5%)
3. Hinduism (5.37%)
4. Christianity (0.04%)
5. Others (0.01%)

== Ethnicity ==
This Union is home to a variety of different ethnic groups. Among them, 3,263 are Bengali, 3,467 are Tanchangya, 3,118 are Marma and 93 are of others ethnic groups.

Ethnicity-2022
1. Tanchangya (34.9%)
2. Bengali (32.8%)
3. Marma (31.4%)
4. Others (0.94%)
