= Gaindya Union =

Union of Rangamati District, Chittagong, Bangladesh

Gaindya গাইন্দ্যা
- Union
- Interactive map of Gaindya
- Country: Bangladesh
- Division: Chittagong Division
- District: Rangamati District
- Upazila: Rajasthali Upazila

Area
  - Total: 44.03 km^{2} (17.00 sq mi)

Population (2022)
  - Total: 8,525
  - Density: 193.6/km^{2} (501.5/sq mi)
- Time zone: UTC+6 (BST)
- Postal code: 4540
- Website: gaindyaup.rangamati.gov.bd

Gaindya Union is a union of Rajasthali Upazila under Rangamati District.

== Demography ==
According to 2022 census, total population of the Union are 8,525. Among them, 1,236 are Muslim, 6,470 are Buddhist, 362 are Christian and 187 are Hindu.

Religion-2022
1. Buddhism (79.1%)
2. Islam (14.5%)
3. Christianity (4.25%)
4. Hinduism (2.19%)
5. Others (0.00%)

== Ethnicity ==
This Union is home to a variety of different ethnic groups. Among them, 1,492 are Bengali, 5,330 are Marma, 1,157 are Tanchangya and 546 are of others ethnic groups.

Ethnicity-2022
1. Marma (62.5%)
2. Bengali (17.5%)
3. Tanchangya (13.6%)
4. Others (6.40%)
