= Bangalhalia Union =

Union of Rangamati District, Chittagong, Bangladesh

Bangalhalia বাঙ্গালহালিয়া
- Union
- Interactive map of Bangalhalia
- Country: Bangladesh
- Division: Chittagong Division
- District: Rangamati District
- Upazila: Rajasthali Upazila

Area
  - Total: 25.9 km^{2} (10.0 sq mi)

Population (2022)
  - Total: 10,948
  - Density: 423/km^{2} (1,090/sq mi)
- Time zone: UTC+6 (BST)
- Postal code: 4540
- Website: bangalhaliaup.rangamati.gov.bd

Bangalhalia Union is a union of Rajasthali Upazila under Rangamati District.

== Demography ==
According to 2022 census, total population of the Union are 10,948. Among them, 3,934 are Muslim, 5,157 are Buddhist, 1,660 are Hindu and 196 are Christian and 1 follow others religion.

Religion-2022
1. Buddhism (47.1%)
2. Islam (35.9%)
3. Hinduism (15.2%)
4. Christianity (1.79%)
5. Others (0.01%)

== Ethnicity ==
This Union is home to a variety of different ethnic groups. Among them, 6,070 are Bengali, 4,161 are Marma, 274 are Tanchangya, 133 are Chakma and 310 are of others ethnic groups.

Ethnicity-2022
1. Bengali (55.4%)
2. Marma (38.0%)
3. Tanchangya (2.50%)
4. Chakma (1.22%)
5. Others (2.83%)
