= Kaptai High School =

Coordinates: 22.5040°N 92.2124°E

- কাপ্তাই উচ্চ বিদ্যালয়
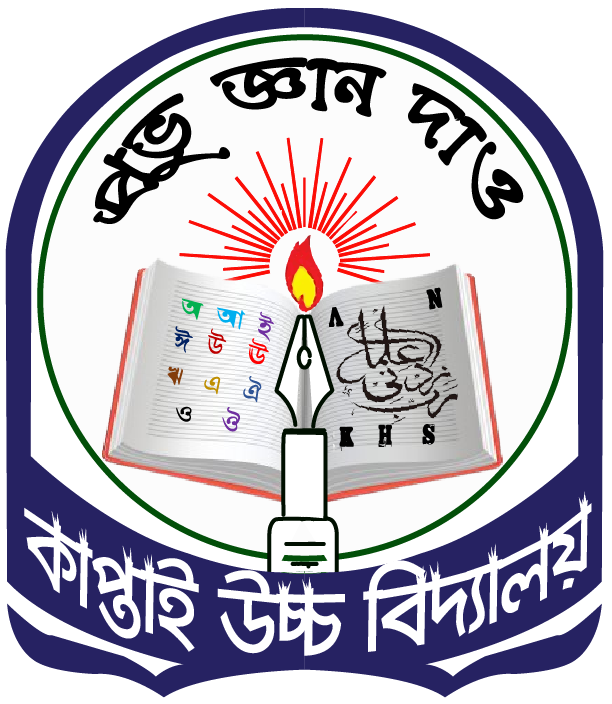
- Kaptai, Rangamati; Chittagong, 4533; Bangladesh

Information
- Motto: প্রভু, জ্ঞান দাও (Oh Lord! Bestow me with Knowledge)
- Established: 1981; 45 years ago
- School board: Chittagong Education Board
- School district: Rangamati
- Session: January–December
- Grades: 6-S.S.C
- Gender: Male and Female
- Age: 10 to 16
- Enrollment: 800
- Language: Bengali
- Campus size: 10 acres
- Colors: Navy Blue, White
- Sports: Cricket, Football

Kaptai High School, Rangamati (Bengali: কাপ্তাই উচ্চ বিদ্যালয়) is a secondary school located in the hill tracts of Rangamati, Bangladesh. It was established in 1981 in Kaptai, Rangamati, Chittagong.

== Campus ==
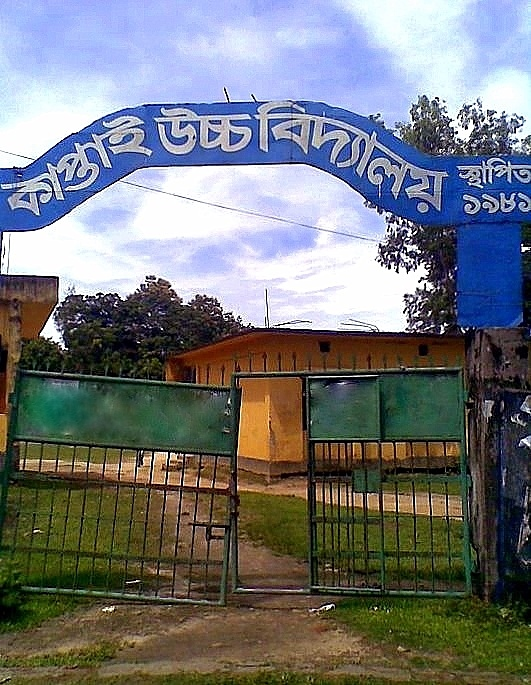
Front view of the school building

The campus of this institution covers an area of 10 acres. The academic building is two stories, L-shaped. Facilities available are a library, prayer room, and individual laboratories for Physics, Chemistry, Biology, Computer Science and other subjects.The main academic building has a one-storey extension inside the boundary named "New Academic Building". The school also has a library and laboratories for subjects including physics, chemistry, biology, and computer studies.

== Courses ==
The school has three courses:

- Arts
- Science
- Commerce

== Extra-curricular activities ==
This school is renowned for not only education, but also extra-curricular activities. It won the national championship of cricket, football several times. It has a large playground where the students can practice different games. Many inter-city and inter-school cricket and football tournament are held on the field of this school throughout the year.

The activities of Rover Scout are also held at this school. Every year, the school authority arranges inter-school sporting events in the school field.

== Curriculum ==
The syllabus of every class is made by the teachers of this institution according to the syllabus of the Chittagong Education Board. The medium of instruction is Bengali. The students of class IX, X and SSC have to participate in the laboratory workout as well as theory classes. Three semester exams are taken in a year. These are 1st, 2nd and final semester. If a student fails in the final exam he or she will not be promoted in the next class. The students of class VIII and X have to participate in the Junior School Certificate Exam, and Secondary School Certificate Exam.

== Admission ==
In January the school takes students in class VI, VII, VIII and IX. Students have to qualify in a highly competitive admission test in order to get admitted in this school.

== Activities and achievements ==
Every year several students achieve good result in the whole education board. Student's got GOLDEN A+, not only in the education system, but also in the other sector like debating and cultural activity where they participate in national competition and bring a great result for the Kaptai High School.

== Programs ==
Kaptai High School arranges different programs on the school campus. Former students of the school also arrange different program on different occasion.

== See also ==
- List of schools in Bangladesh
