= Dumdumya Union =

Union of Rangamati District, Chittagong, Bangladesh

Dumdumya দুমদুম্যা
- Union
- Interactive map of Dumdumya
- Country: Bangladesh
- Division: Chittagong Division
- District: Rangamati District
- Upazila: Jurachhari Upazila

Area
  - Total: 315.98 km^{2} (122.00 sq mi)

Population (2022)
  - Total: 7,665
  - Density: 24.26/km^{2} (62.83/sq mi)
- Time zone: UTC+6 (BST)
- Postal code: 4560
- Website: dumdumyaup.rangamati.gov.bd

Dumdumya Union is a union of Juraichhari Upazila under Rangamati District.

== Demography ==
According to 2022 census, total population of the Union are 7,665. Among them, 164 are Muslim, 7,351 are Buddhist, 125 are Christian and 25 are Hindu.

Religion-2022
1. Buddhism (95.9%)
2. Islam (2.14%)
3. Christianity (1.63%)
4. Hinduism (0.33%)
5. Others (0.00%)

== Ethnicity ==
This Union is home to a variety of different ethnic groups. Among them, 234 are Bengali, 6,678 are Chakma, 594 are Tanchangya and 159 are of others ethnic groups.

Ethnicity-2022
1. Chakma (87.1%)
2. Tanchangya (7.75%)
3. Bengali (3.05%)
4. Others (2.08%)
