= Raikhali Union =

Union of Rangamati District, Chittagong, Bangladesh

Raikhali রাইখালী
- Union
- Interactive map of Raikhali
- Country: Bangladesh
- Division: Chittagong Division
- District: Rangamati District
- Upazila: Kaptai Upazila

Area
  - Total: 82.88 km^{2} (32.00 sq mi)

Population (2022)
  - Total: 15,924
  - Density: 192.1/km^{2} (497.6/sq mi)
- Time zone: UTC+6 (BST)
- Postal code: 4530
- Website: raikhaliup.rangamati.gov.bd

Raikhali Union is a union of Kaptai Upazila under Rangamati District.

== Demography ==
According to 2022 census, total population of the Union are 15,924. Among them, 5,490 are Muslim, 9,771 are Buddhist, 640 are Hindu, 15 are Christian and 8 follow others religion.

Religion-2022
1. Buddhism (61.4%)
2. Islam (34.5%)
3. Hinduism (4.02%)
4. Christianity (0.09%)
5. Others (0.05%)

== Ethnicity ==
This Union is home to a variety of different ethnic groups. Among them, 6,382 are Bengali, 8,284 are Marma, 1,154 are Tanchangya, 126 are Chakma and 18 are of others ethnic groups.

Ethnicity-2022
1. Marma (51.8%)
2. Bengali (40.1%)
3. Tanchangya (7.25%)
4. Chakma (0.79%)
5. Others (0.11%)
