= Selina Akhter =

Bangladeshi academic

- Education: University of Chittagong
- Occupation: academic
- Employer: Rangamati Science and Technology University

Selina Akhter is a Bangladeshi academic and the vice-chancellor of the Rangamati Science and Technology University, a public university in Rangamati Hill District. Akhter is a former president of the Chittagong University Teachers Association.

== Early life ==
Akhter completed her bachelor's degree and master's in management at the University of Chittagong in 1982. She has a PhD in management.

== Career ==
Akhter joined the University of Chittagong in 1988 as a lecturer.

In 2007, Akhter was promoted to professor at the University of Chittagong. In April 2008, she was elected to the Chittagong University Teachers' Association from the yellow panel backed by the Awami League.

In January 2022, Akhter was elected President of the Chittagong University Teachers' Association. She spoke at election rally of Alauddin Ahmed Chowdhury Nasim, the Awami League candidate for Feni-1.

On 19 September 2022, Akhter was appointed the vice-chancellor of the Rangamati Science and Technology University. She left this position in 2024.
