= Bara Harina Union =

Union of Rangamati District, Chittagong, Bangladesh

Bara Harina বড় হরিণা
- Union
- Interactive map of Bara Harina
- Country: Bangladesh
- Division: Chittagong Division
- District: Rangamati District
- Upazila: Barkal Upazila

Area
  - Total: 160.58 km^{2} (62.00 sq mi)

Population (2022)
  - Total: 5,970
  - Density: 37.2/km^{2} (96.3/sq mi)
- Time zone: UTC+6 (BST)
- Postal code: 4570
- Website: borohorinaup.rangamati.gov.bd

Bara Harina Union is a union of Barkal Upazila under Rangamati District.

== Demography ==
According to 2022 census, total population of the Union are 5,970. Among them, 120 are Muslim, 5,660 are Buddhist, 177 are Christian, 8 are Hindu and 5 follow others religion.

Religion-2022
1. Buddhism (94.8%)
2. Christianity (2.97%)
3. Islam (2.01%)
4. Hinduism (0.13%)
5. Others (0.08%)

== Ethnicity ==
This Union is home to a variety of different ethnic groups. Among them, 362 are Bengali, 5,426 are Chakma and 182 are of others ethnic groups.

Ethnicity-2022
1. Chakma (90.9%)
2. Bengali (6.06%)
3. Others (3.05%)
