= Gulshakhali Union =

Union of Rangamati District, Chittagong, Bangladesh

Gulshakhali গুলশাখালী
- Union
- Interactive map of Gulshakhali
- Country: Bangladesh
- Division: Chittagong Division
- District: Rangamati District
- Upazila: Langadu Upazila

Area
  - Total: 50.83 km^{2} (19.63 sq mi)

Population (2022)
  - Total: 11,628
  - Density: 228.8/km^{2} (592.5/sq mi)
- Time zone: UTC+6 (BST)
- Postal code: 4580
- Website: gulshakhaliup.rangamati.gov.bd

Gulshakhali Union is a union of Langadu Upazila under Rangamati District.

== Demography ==
According to 2022 census, total population of the Union are 11,628. Among them, 10,349 are Muslim, 985 are Buddhist, 32 are Hindu and 262 are Christian.

Religion-2022
1. Islam (89.0%)
2. Buddhism (8.47%)
3. Christianity (2.25%)
4. Hinduism (0.28%)
5. Others (0.00%)

== Ethnicity ==
This Union is home to a variety of different ethnic groups. Among them, 10,382 are Bengali, 986 are Chakma and 260 are of others ethnic groups.

Ethnicity-2022
1. Bengali (89.3%)
2. Chakma (8.48%)
3. Others (2.24%)
