= Baghaichhari, Rangamati =

Baghaichhari বাঘাইছড়ি
- Municipality
- Interactive map of Baghaichhari
- Coordinates: 23°10′06″N 92°11′43″E
- Country: Bangladesh
- Division: Chittagong Division
- District: Rangamati District
- Upazila: Baghaichhari Upazila

Government
  - Mayor: vacant

Area
  - Total: 22.87 km^{2} (8.83 sq mi)

Population (2022)
  - Total: 15,644
  - Density: 684.0/km^{2} (1,772/sq mi)
- Time zone: UTC+6 (BST)
- Postal code: 4590
- Website: baghaichari.rangamati.gov.bd/en

Baghaichhari is a town of Rangamati District in Chittagong Hill Tracts, Bangladesh.

== Demography ==
According to 2022 census, total population of the town are 15,644. Among them, 12,436 are Muslim, 2,445 are Buddhist, 743 are Hindu and 20 are others.

Religion in Baghaichhari town-2022
1. Islam (79.5%)
2. Buddhism (15.6%)
3. Hinduism (4.75%)
4. Others (0.13%)

Population by religion in wards under municipality
Ward No	Islam	Buddhism	Hinduism	Others
Ward-1	2,491	7	50	0
Ward-2	1,409	22	40	0
Ward-3	1,476	7	40	0
Ward-4	1,768	55	207	0
Ward-5	1,420	273	339	0
Ward-6	1,726	172	0	0
Ward-7	1,533	0	66	0
Ward-8	0	1,288	0	0
Ward-9	613	621	1	20

== Ethnic groups ==
Baghaichhari is home to 13,319 Bengalis, 2,223 Chakma and 102 others people.

Ethnicity in Baghaichhari town (2022)
1. Bengali (85.1%)
2. Chakma (14.2%)
3. Others (0.65%)

Population by ethnicity in wards under municipality
Ward No	Bengali	Chakma	Others
Ward-1	2,541	6	1
Ward-2	1,446	20	5
Ward-3	1,519	4	0
Ward-4	2,018	12	0
Ward-5	1,845	112	76
Ward-6	1,728	172	0
Ward-7	1,599	0	0
Ward-8	13	1,274	1
Ward-9	613	623	19
