= Chandraghona Union =

Union of Rangamati District, Chittagong, Bangladesh

Chandraghona চন্দ্রঘোনা
- Union
- Interactive map of Chandraghona
- Country: Bangladesh
- Division: Chittagong Division
- District: Rangamati District
- Upazila: Kaptai Upazila

Area
  - Total: 49.21 km^{2} (19.00 sq mi)

Population (2022)
  - Total: 9,193
  - Density: 186.8/km^{2} (483.8/sq mi)
- Time zone: UTC+6 (BST)
- Postal code: 4531
- Website: chandraghonaup.rangamati.gov.bd

Chandraghona Union is a union of Kaptai Upazila under Rangamati District.

== Demography ==
According to 2022 census, total population of the Union are 9,193. Among them, 6,909 are Muslim, 988 are Buddhist, 944 are Hindu, 345 are Christian and 7 follow others religion.

Religion-2022
1. Islam (75.2%)
2. Buddhism (10.8%)
3. Hinduism (10.3%)
4. Christianity (3.75%)
5. Others (0.08%)

== Ethnicity ==
This Union is home to a variety of different ethnic groups. Among them, 8,234 are Bengali, 326 are Marma, 292 are Tanchangya, 115 are Chakma and 226 are of others ethnic groups.

Ethnicity-2022
1. Bengali (89.6%)
2. Marma (3.55%)
3. Tanchangya (3.18%)
4. Chakma (1.25%)
5. Others (2.46%)
