= Rangamati Science and Technology University =

Bangladeshi university

- রাঙ্গামাটি বিজ্ঞান ও প্রযুক্তি বিশ্ববিদ্যালয়
- Other name: RMSTU
- Motto in English: Education Harmony Progress
- Type: Public
- Established: 2014; 12 years ago
- Affiliations: University Grants Commission (UGC)
- Chancellor: President Mirza Fakhrul Islam Alamgir
- Vice-Chancellor: Dr. Zainul Abedin Siddique
- Location: Jhagrabil, Rangamati, Chittagong, Bangladesh; 22.6131°N 92.1647°E
- Campus: 65 acres (26 ha)
- Language: Bengali and English
- Website: rmstu.ac.bd

Rangamati Science and Technology University is a public university located in Rangamati, Bangladesh, commonly known as RMSTU. It was established in 2014.

The university has faced vocal opposition from local groups such as Parbatya Chattagram Jana Samhati Samiti (PCJSS) during its establishment. This is due to the fact that the students, staff, and faculty come predominantly from outside the Chittagong Hill Tracts. Opponents to the school believe that the settlement of these people in Rangamati would change the character of the region. The first batch of 75 students began classes in November 2015, at a temporary campus set up at Tabalchharhi Shah High School.

== Academics ==
The university's 5 departments are organized into 3 faculties.

Faculty	Department	Seat
Science, Engineering and Technology Faculty	Computer Science and Engineering	50
Agriculture and Biological Science Faculty	Forestry and Environmental Science	30
Agriculture and Biological Science Faculty	Fisheries and Marine Resources Technology	30
Business Administration Faculty	Business Management	50
Business Administration Faculty	Tourism and hospitality management	30

== List of vice-chancellors ==
- Pradanendu Bikash Chakma (2015–2022)
- Selina Akhter (2022–2024)
- Md. Atiar Rahman (2025–present)

== List of pro-vice chancellors ==
- Kanchan Chakma (2022–2024)
