= Kaptai Union =

Union of Rangamati District, Chittagong, Bangladesh

Kaptai কাপ্তাই
- Union
- Interactive map of Kaptai
- Country: Bangladesh
- Division: Chittagong Division
- District: Rangamati District
- Upazila: Kaptai Upazila

Area
  - Total: 98.42 km^{2} (38.00 sq mi)

Population (2022)
  - Total: 14,912
  - Density: 151.5/km^{2} (392.4/sq mi)
- Time zone: UTC+6 (BST)
- Postal code: 4530
- Website: kaptaiup.rangamati.gov.bd

Kaptai Union is a union of Kaptai Upazila under Rangamati District.

== Demography ==
According to 2022 census, total population of the Union are 14,912. Among them, 10,340 are Muslim, 3,237 are Buddhist, 1,213 are Hindu, 121 are Christian and 1 follow others religion.

Religion-2022
1. Islam (69.3%)
2. Buddhism (21.7%)
3. Hinduism (8.13%)
4. Christianity (0.81%)
5. Others (0.01%)

== Ethnicity ==
This Union is home to a variety of different ethnic groups. Among them, 11,663 are Bengali, 1,561 are Tanchangya, 831 are Chakma, 715 are Marma and 142 are of others ethnic groups.

Ethnicity-2022
1. Bengali (78.2%)
2. Tanchangya (10.5%)
3. Chakma (5.57%)
4. Marma (4.79%)
5. Others (0.96%)
