= Kaptai National Park =

National park in Bangladesh

- IUCN category II (national park)
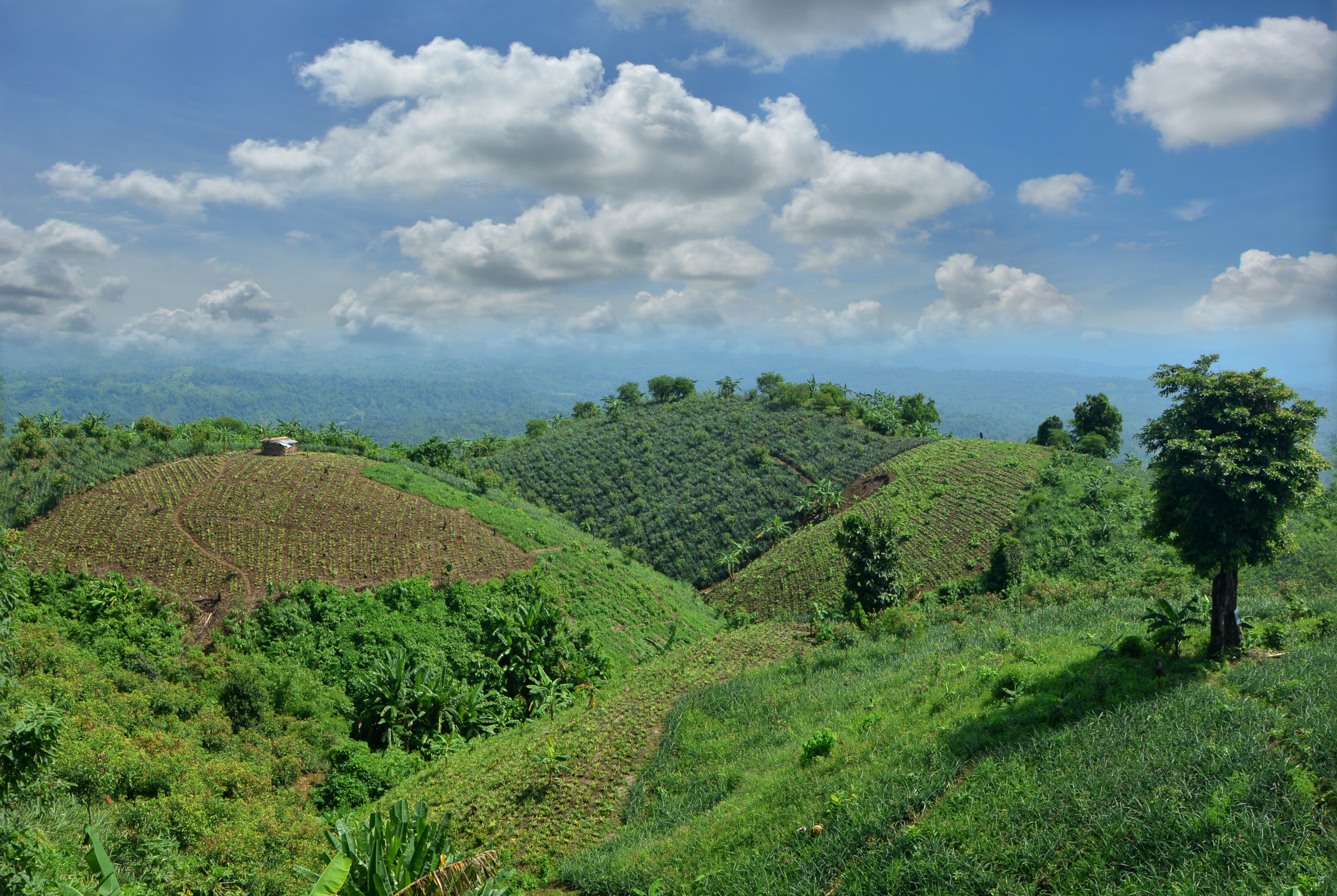

- Location within Bangladesh
- Location: Rangamati District, Chittagong Division, Bangladesh
- Coordinates: 22°30′08″N 92°12′04″E
- Area: 54.64 km^{2} (21.10 sq mi)
- Established: 1999
- Governing body: Bangladesh Forest Department

Kaptai National Park is a national park in Bangladesh situated in Rangamati District. It was established in 1999, and its area is 5,464.78 hectares (13,503.8 acres). Its forest type is mixed evergreen forest.

== Socio-economic context ==
The national park is situated inside the Kaptai City and it gets many visitors year-round. Nearly 60 local people are employed as service providers to tourists. Kaptai National Park provides subsistence to local people through NTFPs. The population of the area surrounding the national park area is about 3000. The park is located near the largest man-made lake in Bangladesh, which is Kaptai Lake.

== Wildlife diversity ==
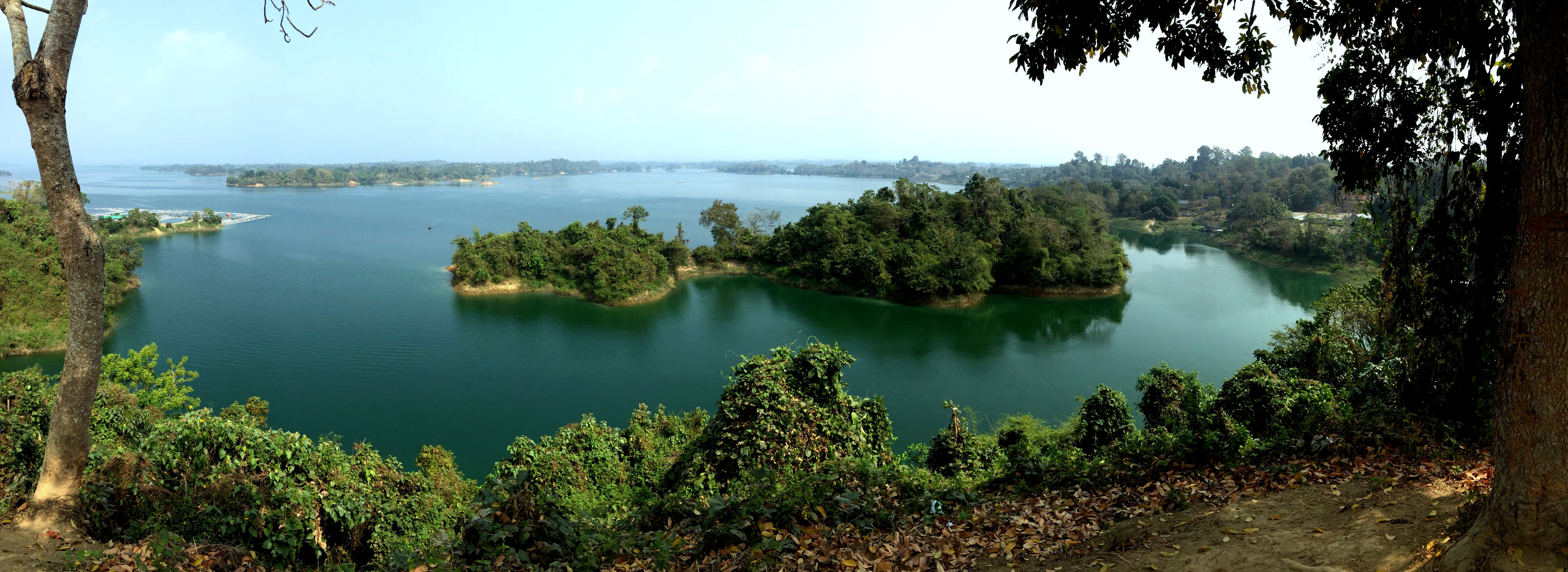
Kaptai National Park

The large blue flycatcher (Cyornis magnirostris), a bird species never before recorded in the country, was sighted in 2014.

== Threat assessment ==
The main threats to this NP are illicit felling of commercially important teak, intensive collection of fuel wood, and over grazing of livestock. Fuel wood collection takes many forms, from collection of dead wood to harvesting of branches and whole stem, which, if not sustainably done, may damage the ecological balance of this NP. Continuous droughts and civil strife have resulted in a large increase in the number of people along the boundaries of the park in the last three decades. Most of these people own livestock and engage in subsistence agriculture. The presence of large numbers of livestock has increased pressure on the national park.

== Gallery ==
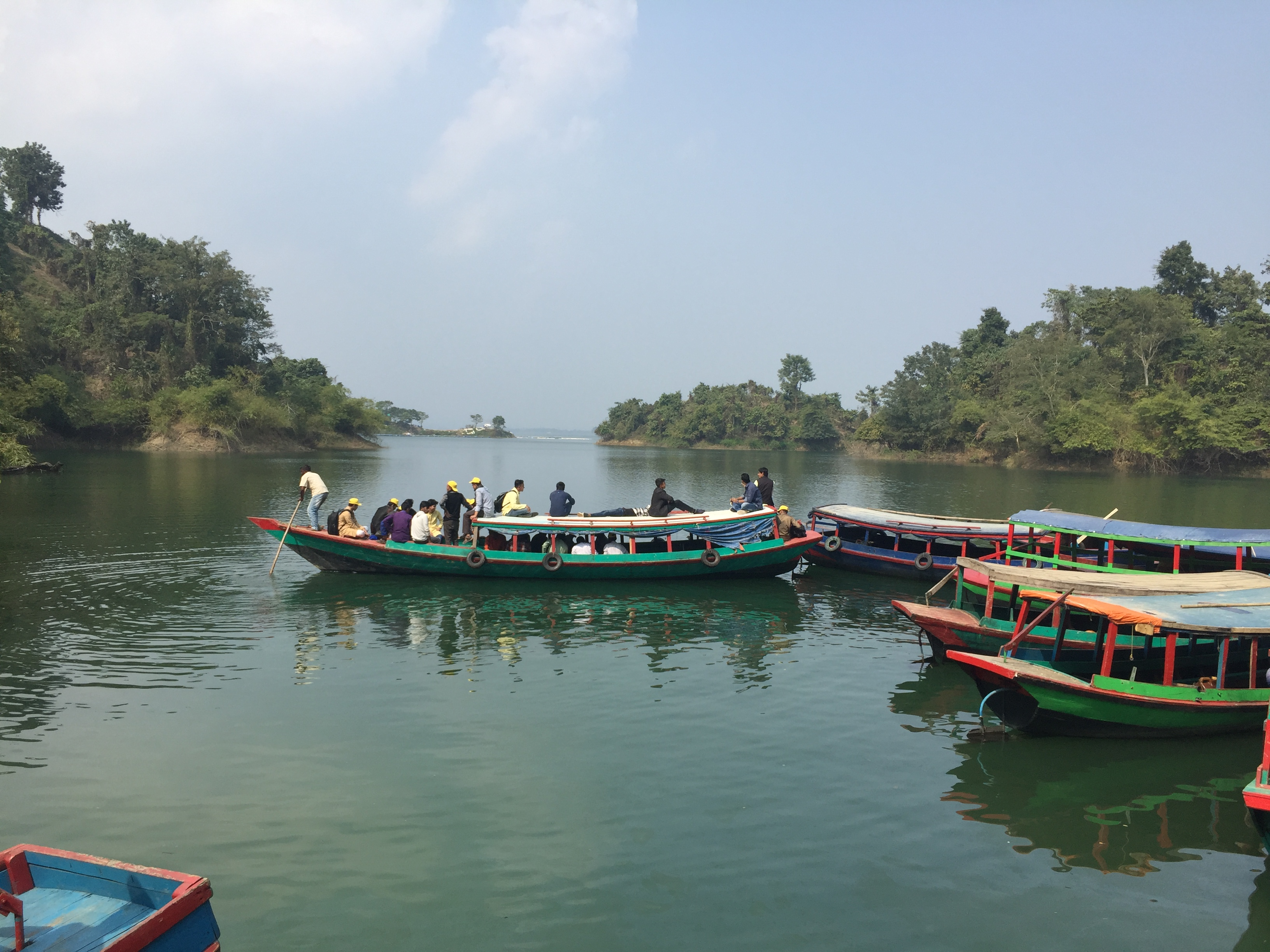
Boats on the lake

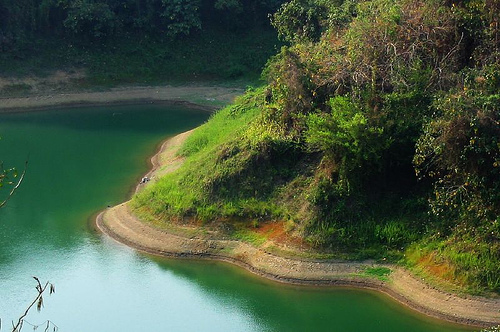
The lake

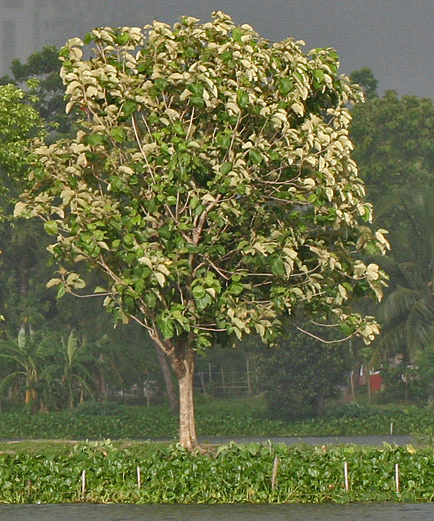
A Teak tree

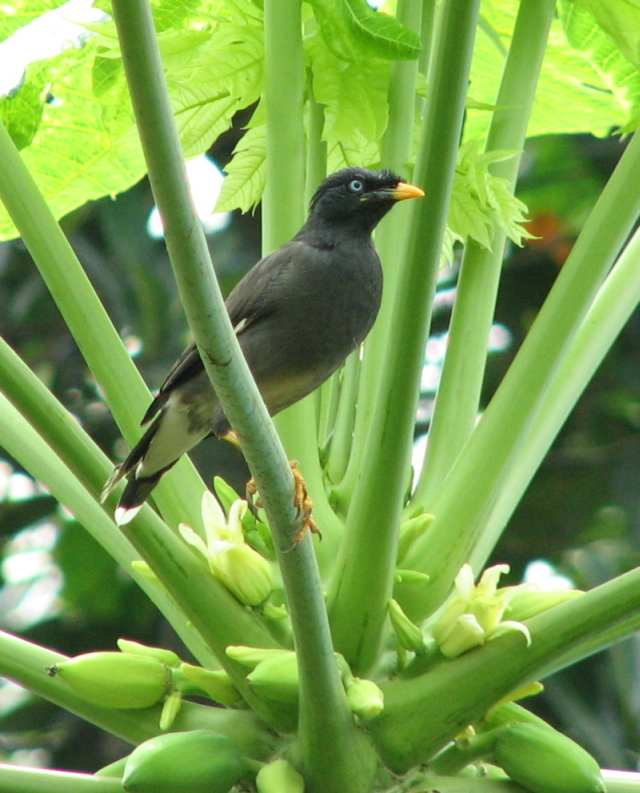
Jungle myna

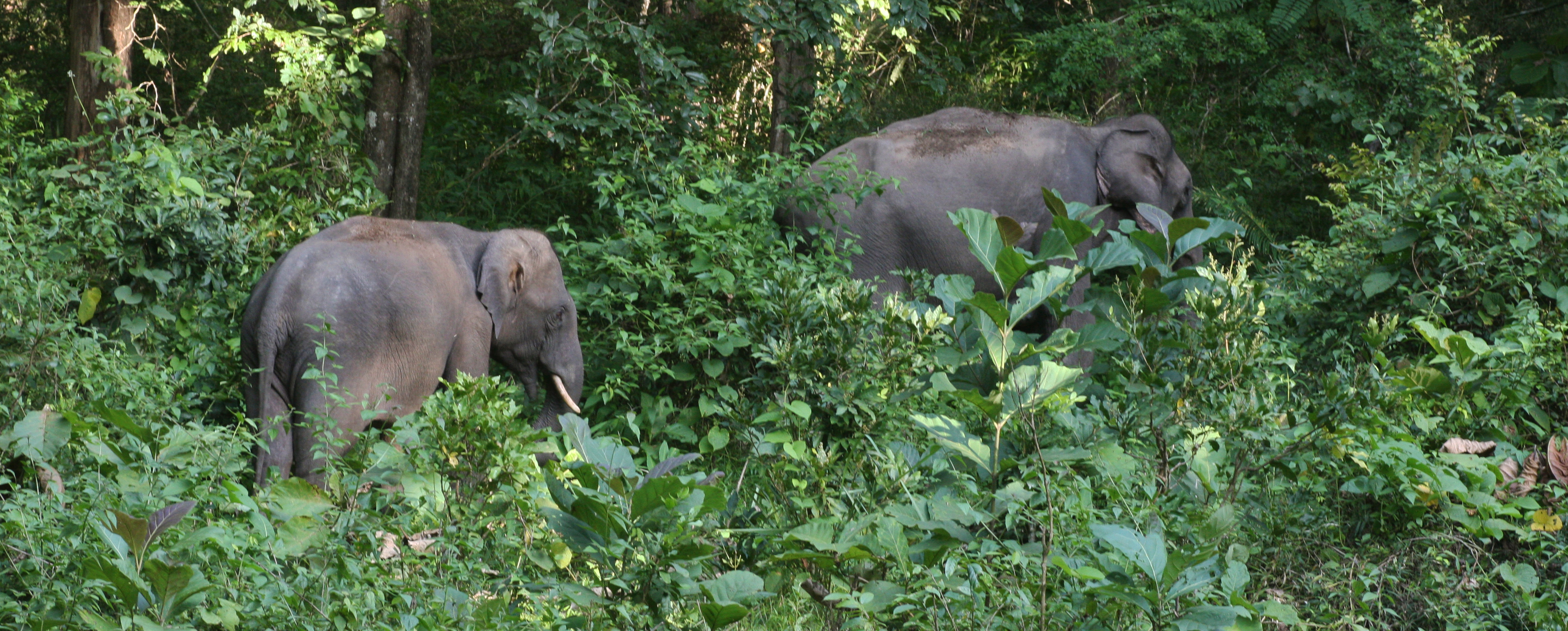
Herd of wild elephants

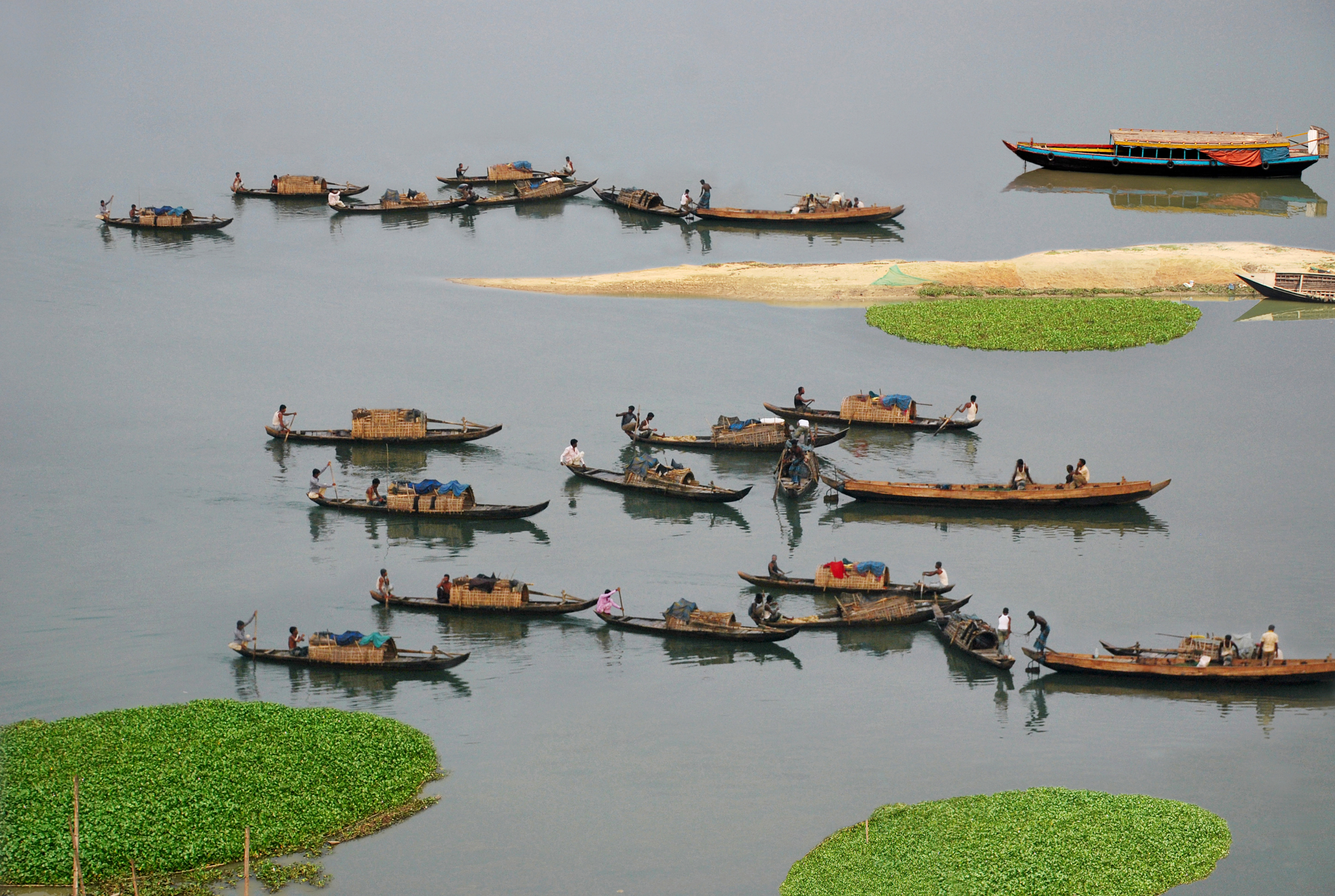
Fishing kaptai at Lake

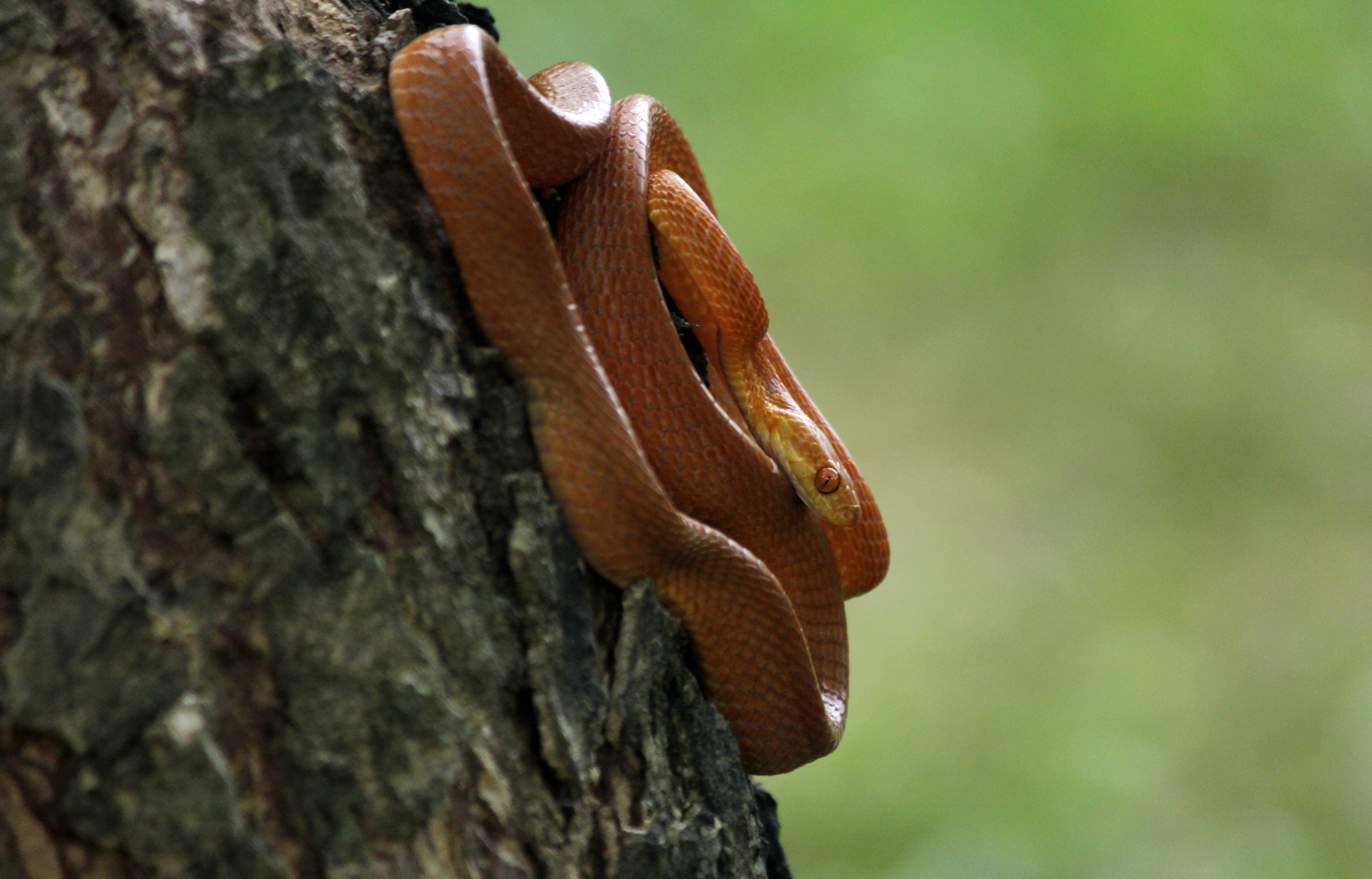
Tawny cat snake

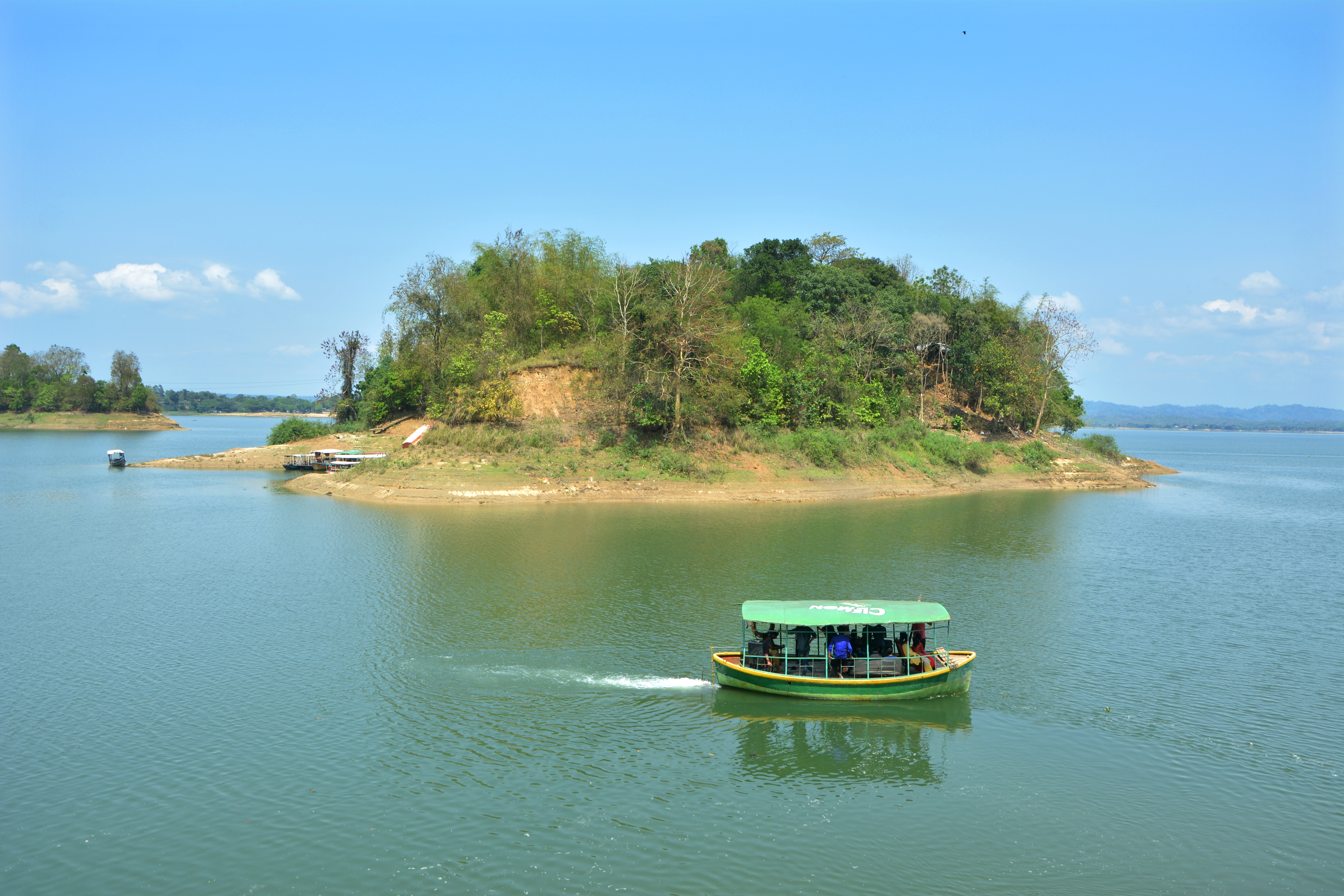
Island in Kaptai Lake

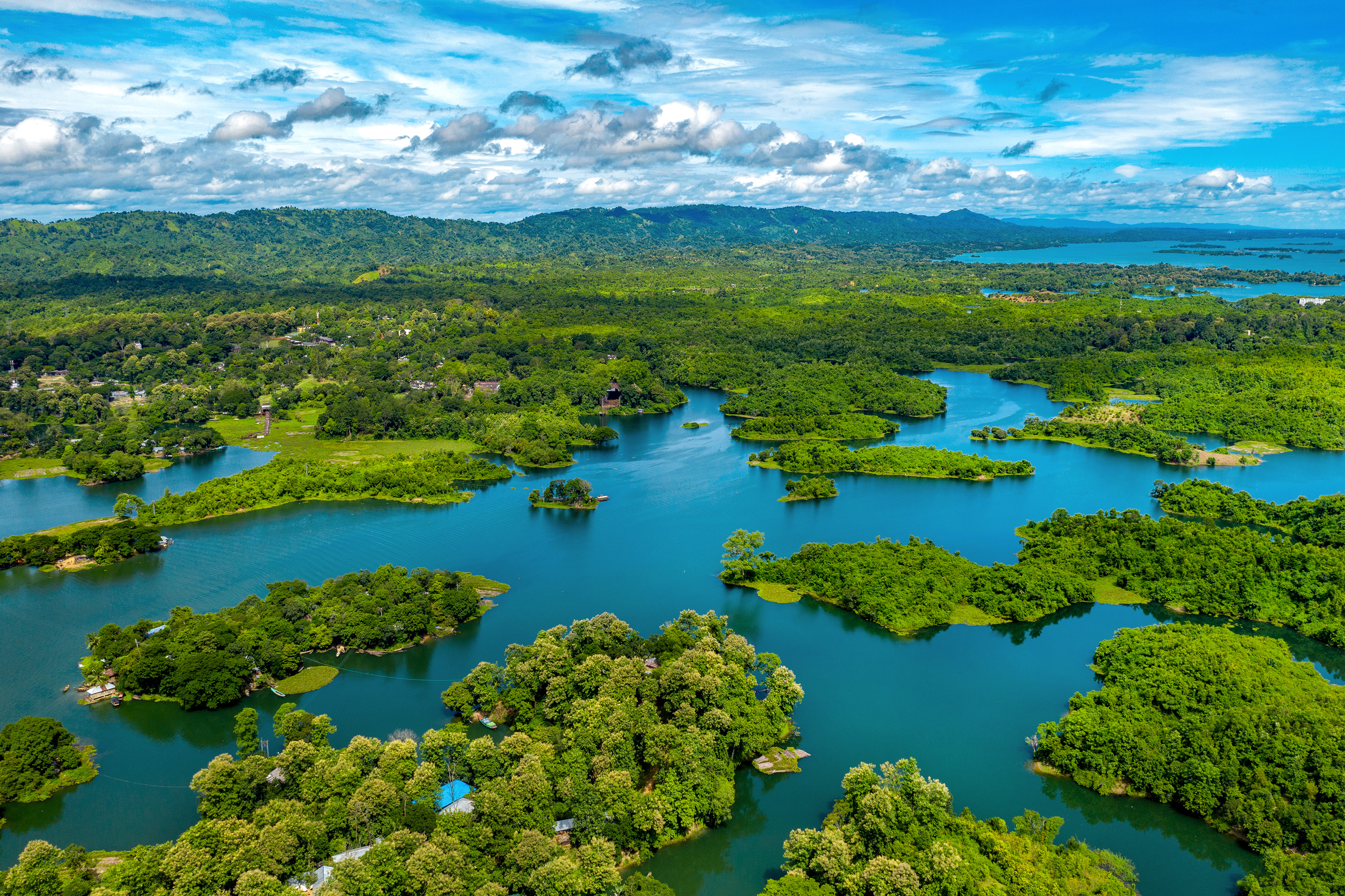
Kaptai National Park view

== See also ==
- Bhawal National Park
- Satchari National Park
- List of protected areas of Bangladesh
- Madhupur tract
- Sangu Wildlife Sanctuary
- Sundarbans
