= Kaptai Upazila =

Kaptai কাপ্তাই
- Upazila
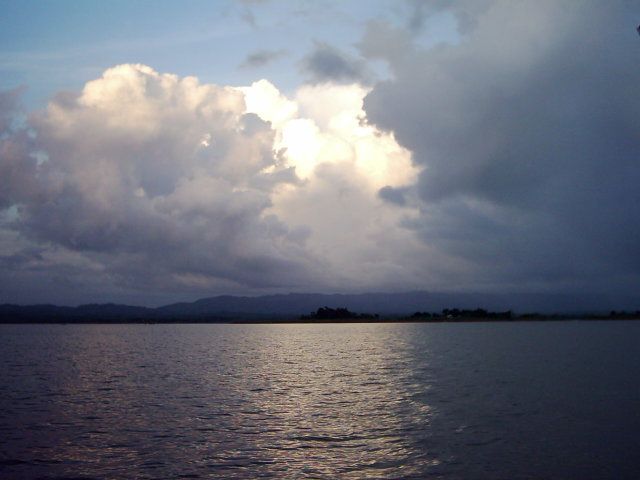
- Kaptai Lake on Karnaphuli River

- Coordinates: 22°30′N 92°13′E
- Country: Bangladesh
- Division: Chittagong
- District: Rangamati

Area
  - Total: 258.99 km^{2} (100.00 sq mi)

Population (2022)
  - Total: 55,410
  - Density: 213.9/km^{2} (554.1/sq mi)
- Time zone: UTC+6 (BST)
- Postal code: 4530
- Area code: 03529
- Website: kaptai.rangamati.gov.bd

Kaptai Upazila mauza geocode map

Kaptai (Bengali: কাপ্তাই) is an upazila of Rangamati District in Chittagong Division of Bangladesh.

== Geography ==
Kaptai is located at 22.5000°N 92.2167°E. It has a total area 258.99 km^{2}. Kaptai upazila is bordered by Kawkhali and Rangamati Sadar upazilas to the north, Belaichhari upazila to the east, Bandarban district to the south and Chittagong district to the west.

== History ==
The name of the Kaptai was derived from the Tripuri word "Kaptetoima". It is said that in the past, the river was wild and full of tropical flora and fauna. Large quantities and several varieties of canes could be found along the river bank that flows from the south, upper ridge. The river reaches its estuary at the Kainsa Khyong (Karnafuli River).

== Notable places ==
Notable landmarks are the Karnaphuli Hydroelectric Power Station, the only hydroelectric power plant of Bangladesh. The Kaptai Dam, built for this purpose on the Karnaphuli River, created the Kaptai Lake, the largest man-made dam in Bangladesh.

== Demographics ==
According to the 2022 Bangladeshi census, Kaptai Upazila had 13,118 households and a population of 55,410. 8.14% of the population were under 5 years of age. Kaptai had a literacy rate (age 7 and over) of 73.24%: 79.51% for males and 66.73% for females, and a sex ratio of 103.78 males for every 100 females. 33,985 (61.33%) lived in urban areas.

=== Ethnicity and religion ===
Religions in Kaptai Upazila (2022)
Religion	Percent
Islam	47.37%
Buddhism	45.35%
Hinduism	6.23%
Christianity	1.02%
Other or not stated	0.03%

Population by religion in Union
Union	Muslim	Buddhist	Hindu	Christian	Others
Chandraghona	6,909	988	944	345	7
Chitmaram	1172	4,065	121	79	1
Kaptai	10,340	3,237	1,213	121	1
Raikhali	5,490	9,771	640	15	8
Wagga	2,333	7,069	534	4	1

🟩 Muslim majority 🟨 Buddhist majority

As of the 2022 Bangladeshi census, Kaptai upazila had a population of 55,410. The ethnic population was 24,543 (44.29%), of which Marma were 15,844, Tanchangya 6,881 and Chakma 1,246.

Ethnicity in the Kaptai Upazila (2022)
1. Bengali (55.7%)
2. Marma (28.6%)
3. Tanchangya (12.4%)
4. Chakma (2.25%)
5. Others (1.03%)

Population by ethnicity in Union
Union	Bengali	Marma	Tonchonga	Chakma	Others
Chandraghona	8,234	326	292	115	226
Chitmaram	1,323	3,441	407	125	142
Kaptai	11,663	715	1,561	831	142
Raikhali	6,382	8,244	1,154	126	18
Wagga	3,263	3,118	3,467	49	44

🟩 Bengali majority 🟦 Marma majority 🟪 Tonchonga majority

== Landmarks ==
- Kaptai lake
- Karnaphuli Paper Mills
- Kaptai National Park is situated at Rangamati. It was established in 1999 and its area is 5,464.78 hectares(13,498.0 Acres).
- Waggachara Tea Estate is situated on the bank of the Karnaphuli river.

== Administration ==
UNO: Md. Mohi Uddin

Kaptai Upazila is divided into five union parishads: Chandraghona, Chitmaram, Kaptai, Raikhali, and Wagga. The union parishads are subdivided into 10 mauzas and 144 villages.

== See also ==
- Upazilas of Bangladesh
- Districts of Bangladesh
- Divisions of Bangladesh
- Administrative geography of Bangladesh
