= Karnaphuli (disambiguation) =

Karnaphuli is a river in Bangladesh. It may also refer to:

- Karnaphuli Tunnel, a tunnel in Chittagong
- Karnaphuli Upazila, a upazila in Bangladesh
- Karnaphuli Group, an industrial conglomerate in Bangladesh
- Karnaphuli Paper Mills, a paper mill in Rangamati
- Karnaphuli Hydropower Station, a hydro-power plant in Rangamati
- Karnaphuli Fertilizer Company Limited, a fertilizer company in Chittagong
- Karnaphuli Gas Distribution Company Limited, a gas distribution company in Chittagong
- Karnaphuli Export Processing Zone, an export processing zone in Bangladesh
