= Love Point, Bangladesh =

Memorial in Kaptai, Rangamati, Bangladesh

Love Point
- Love Point Bangladesh
- Interactive map of Love Point
- Location: Rangamati District, Bangladesh
- Coordinates: 22°38′29″N 92°11′54″E
- Established: 2018
- Open: All year
- Status: Open
- Inaugural Date: 29 November 2018

Love Point (Bengali: লাভ পয়েন্ট) is a memorial of love. It is located at Polwell park, Rangamati, Bangladesh. It was built to honor a couple who died in a boat accident at Kaptai Lake.

== History ==
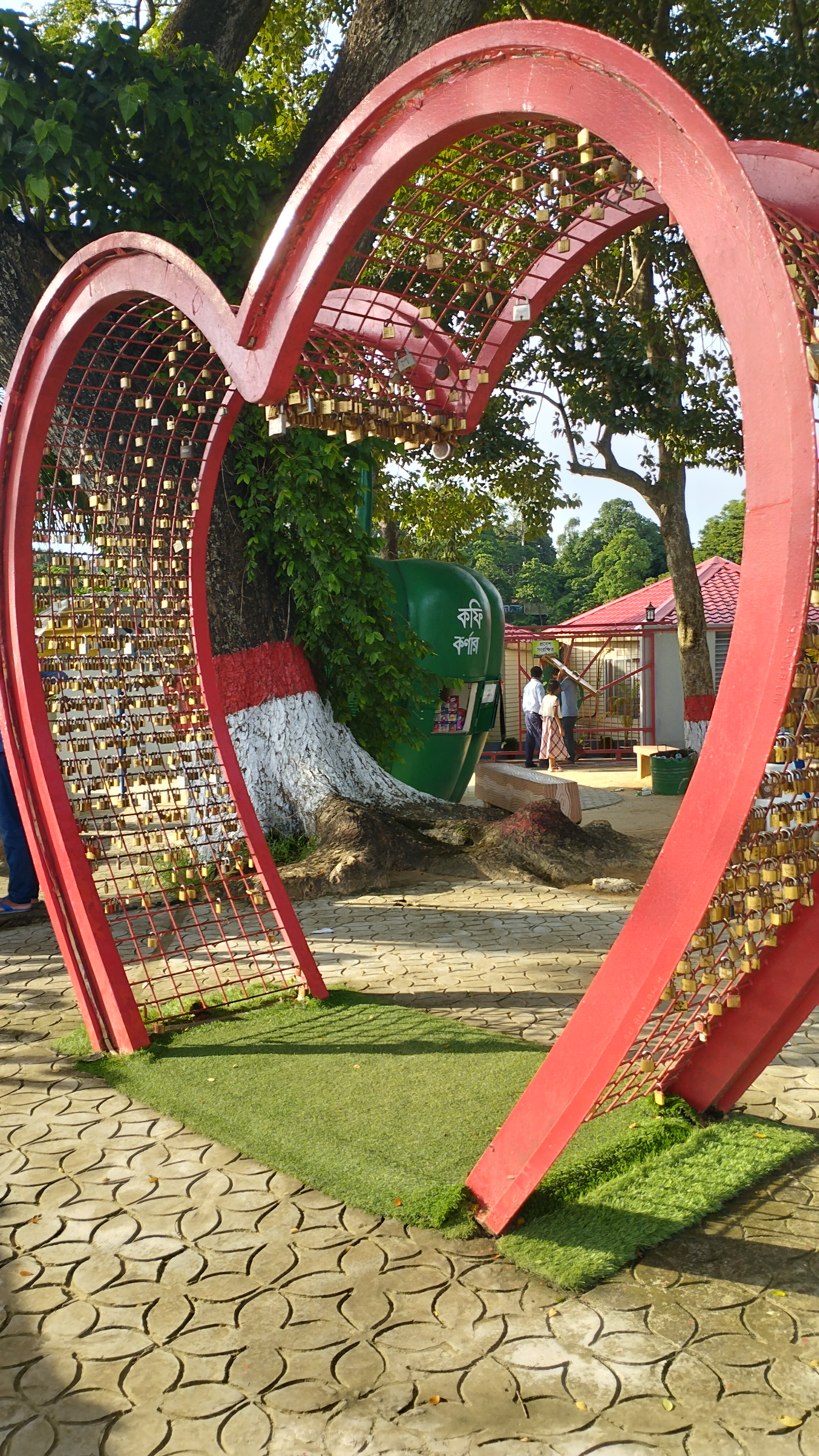

Alauddin Patwary and his wife Ayrin Lima were Bangladeshi-Americans.

On 19 March 2014, the couple visited Kaptai Lake by a boat. Their boat sank on the Lake. Their bodies were found three days later, locked in an embrace. The Chittagong Hill Tracts Development Board construct this memorial to mark their love for each other.

On 29 November 2018, Love Point is unveiled by Novo Bikrom Kishore Thripura, Chairman of Chittagong Hill Tracts Development Board.

== Gallery ==
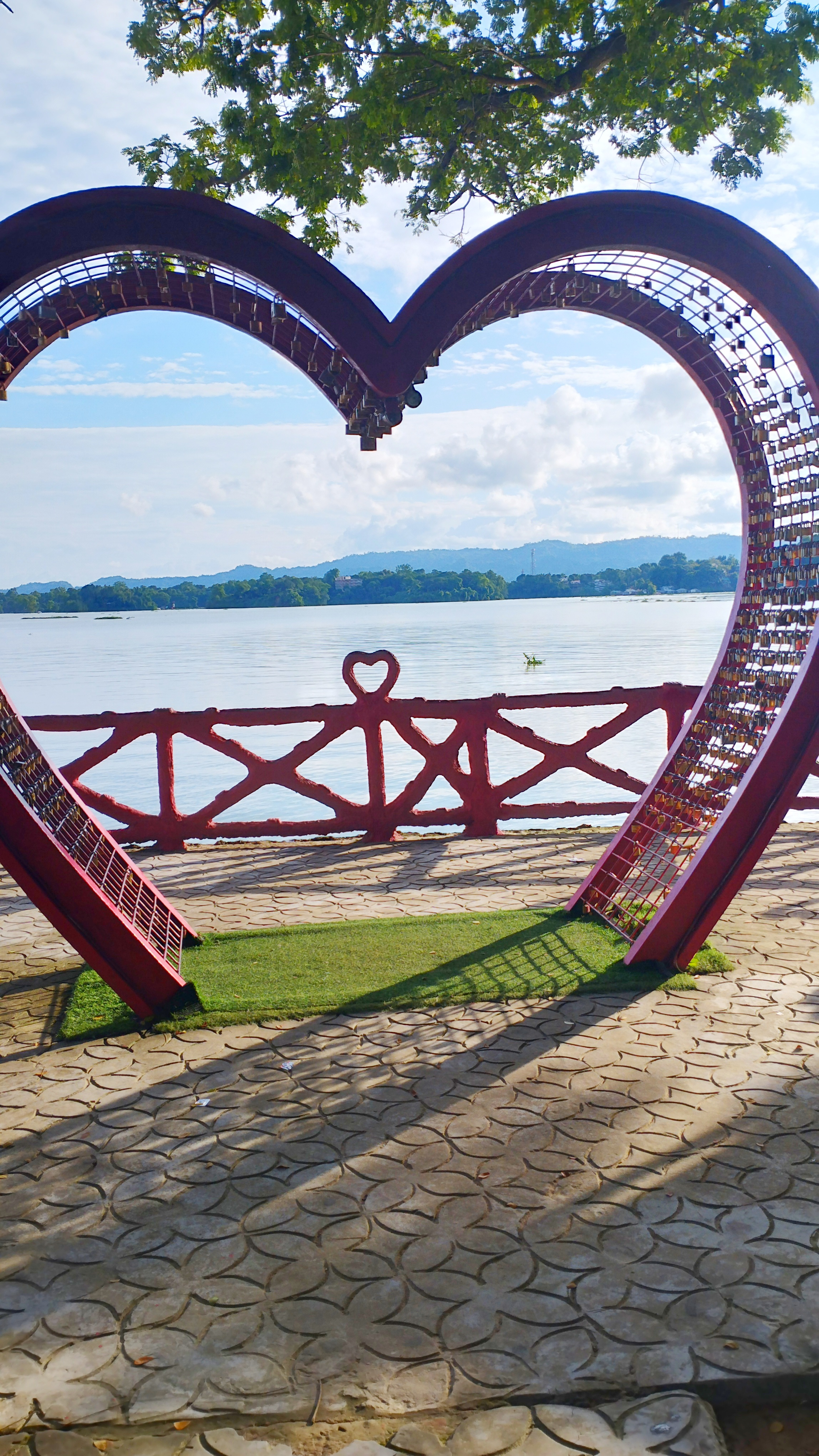

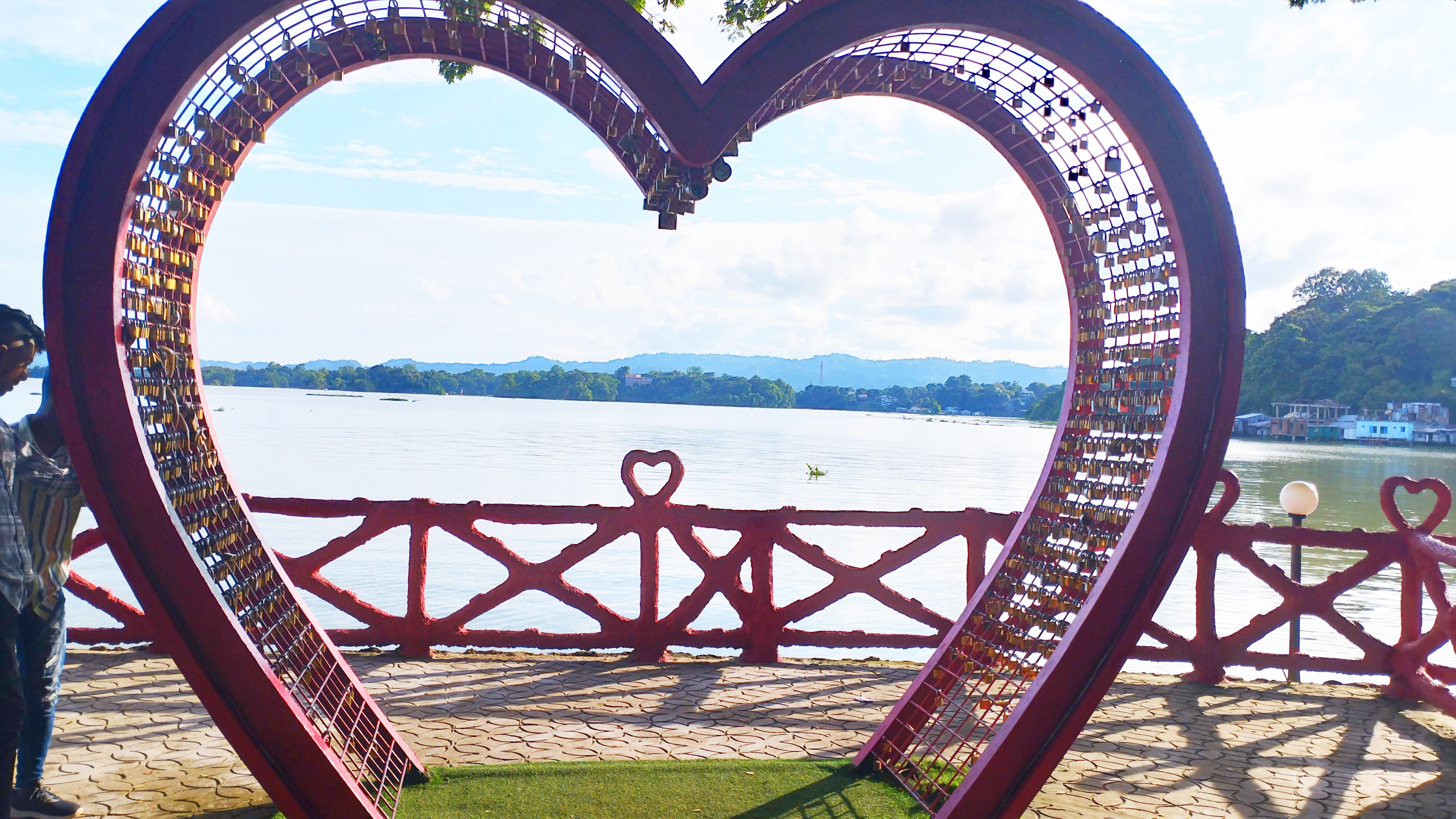

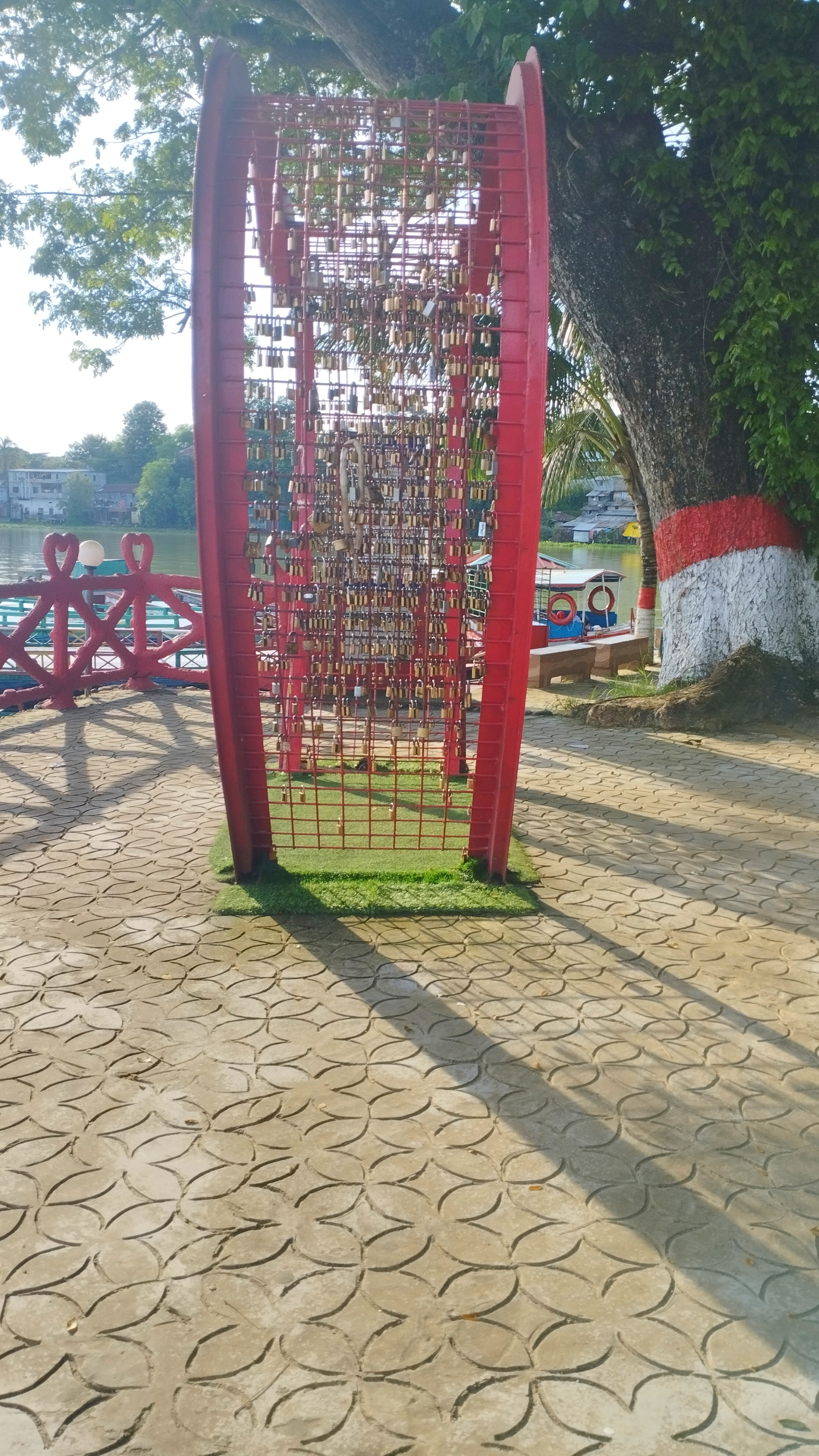

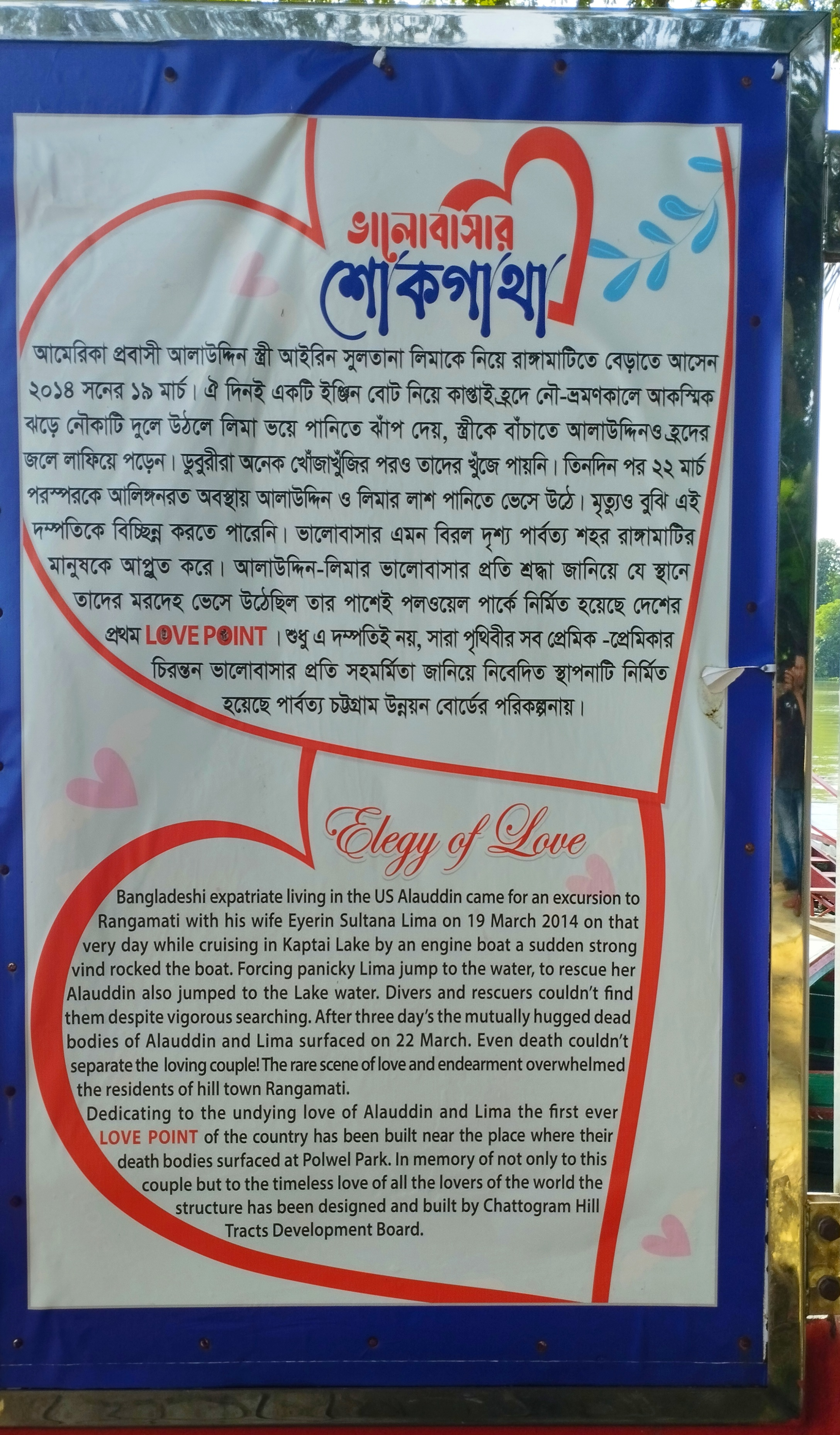
