= Karnaphuli Hydropower Station =

Hydropower station in Bangladesh

- Country: Bangladesh
- Coordinates: 22°29′42″N 92°13′31″E
- Operator: Bangladesh Water Development Board

The Karnaphuli Hydropower Station, commonly referred to as the Kaptai Hydroelectric Power Station, is a hydroelectric power generating facility situated in Kaptai Upazila, Rangamati District, within the Chittagong Division of Bangladesh. This power station was constructed by building a dam, known as Kaptai Dam, across the Karnaphuli River, harnessing the power of flowing water to generate electricity।

== History ==
In 1956, to meet the increasing electricity demand in what was then East Pakistan, a hydroelectric dam was constructed on the Karnaphuli River, creating the artificial Kaptai Lake.

Funded by the United States, the Pakistani government began building the Kaptai Hydroelectric Power Station in 1956. The project was completed in 1962 by International Engineering Company and Utah International Inc. The dam, measuring 670.6 meters in length and 54.7 meters in height, features a 745-foot-long spillway equipped with 16 gates capable of discharging over 525,000 cubic feet of water per second. Initially budgeted at approximately 25.4 crore, the project's final cost exceeded 48 crore.

== Capacity ==
The initial planned capacity of the power plant was set at 120,000 kilowatts. In the early stages, Units 1 and 2, each with a capacity of 40 megawatts, were installed. In 1969, work began on Unit 3, which had a capacity of 50 megawatts. Currently, there are five units in operation, collectively generating a total of 230 megawatts.
