= Kaptai Dam =

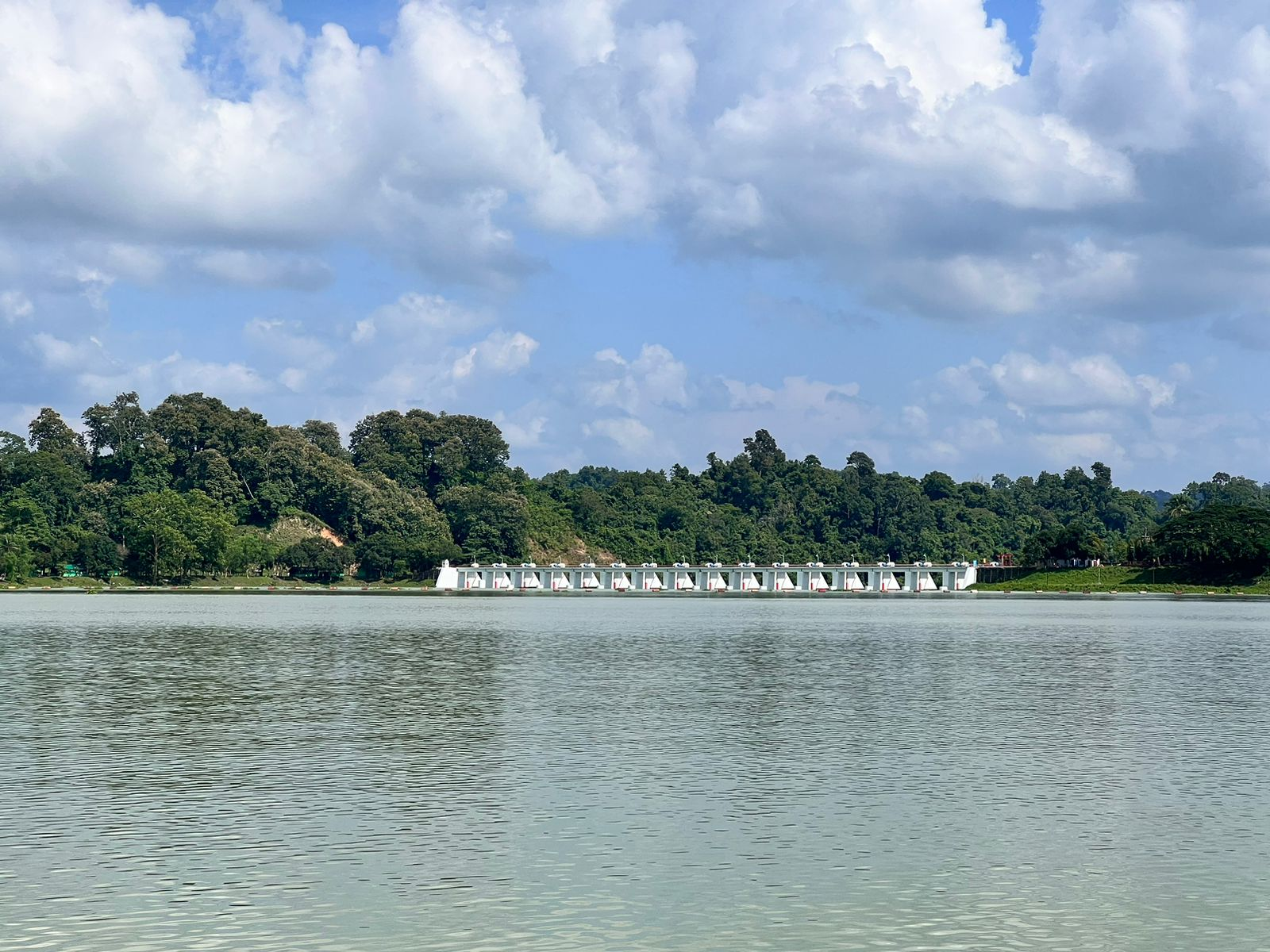
- The dam in 2023

- Location within Bangladesh
- Country: Bangladesh
- Location: Kaptai, Rangamati District
- Coordinates: 22°29′42″N 92°13′30″E
- Purpose: Power
- Status: Operational
- Construction began: 1957
- Opening date: 1962

Dam and spillways
- Type of dam: Embankment
- Impounds: Karnaphuli River
- Height: 45.7 m (150 ft)
- Length: 670.6 m (2,200 ft)
- Width (crest): 7.6 m (25 ft)
- Width (base): 45.7 m (150 ft)
- Dam volume: 1,977,000 m^{3} (69,800,000 cu ft)
- Spillway type: Controlled, 16 gates
- Spillway capacity: 16,000 m^{3}/s (570,000 cu ft/s)

Reservoir
- Creates: Kaptai Lake
- Total capacity: 6,477,000,000 m^{3} (5,251,000 acre⋅ft)
- Catchment area: 11,000 km^{2} (4,200 sq mi)
- Surface area: 777 km^{2} (300 sq mi)
- Normal elevation: 33 m (108 ft)

Power Station
- Commission date: 1962, 1982, 1988
- Turbines: 2 x 40 MW (54,000 hp), 3 x 50 MW (67,000 hp) Kaplan-type
- Installed capacity: 230 MW (310,000 hp)

Kaptai Dam (Bengali: কাপ্তাই বাঁধ) is on the Karnaphuli River at Kaptai, 65 km (40 mi) upstream from Chittagong in Rangamati District, Bangladesh. It is an earth-fill embankment dam with a reservoir (known as Kaptai Lake) with water storage capacity of 6,477 million cubic metres (5,251,000 acre⋅ft). The primary purpose of the dam and reservoir was to generate hydroelectric power. Construction was completed in 1962, in then-East Pakistan. The generators in the 230 MW (310,000 hp) Karnafuli Hydroelectric Power Station were commissioned between 1962 and 1988. It is the only hydroelectric power station in Bangladesh.

== History ==
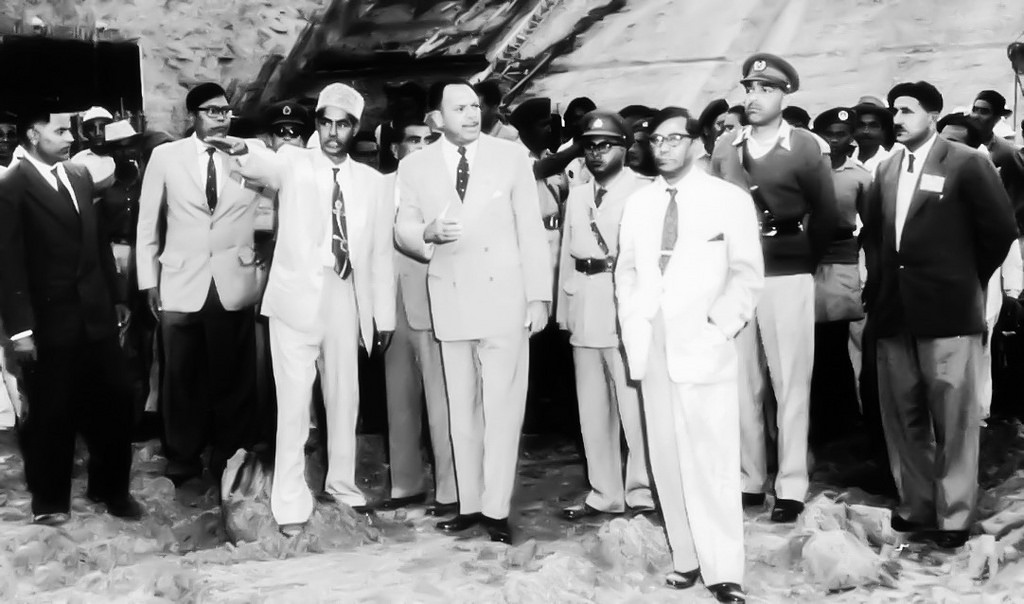
Kaptai Dam being visited by President of Pakistan Ayub Khan

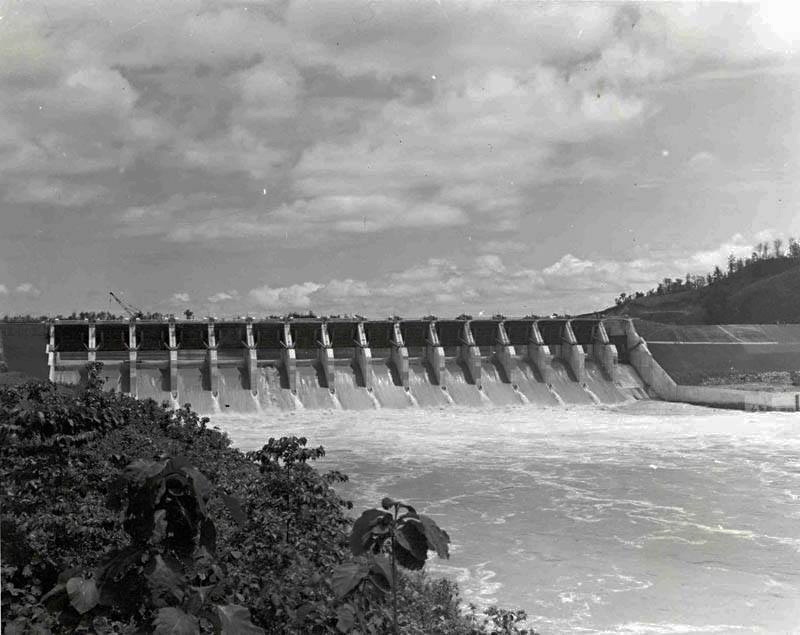
Kaptai Dam in 1965

A brief reconnaissance occurred in 1906 when the Karnafuli Hydropower Station was first contemplated. A second study was carried out in 1923. In 1946, E. A. Moore recommended the proposed project at Barkal about 65 kilometers upstream of the present dam site at Kaptai. In 1950, the Marz Rendal Vatten Consulting Engineers suggested a site at Chilardak, about 45 kilometers upstream of Kaptai.

In 1951, the government engineers proposed Chitmoram, 11 km (6.8 mi) downstream of the present site. Under the guidance of the chief engineer (Irrigation) Khwaja Azimuddin, the construction site was chosen in 1951. Utah International Inc. was selected as a construction contractor. Construction of the dam started in 1957 and was completed in 1962 during the era of President Muhammad Ayub Khan.

During his tenure as Governor, Azam Khan joined hands with American aid chief retired Air Force Colonel Charles W. Edwards to finish the much-anticipated, $100,000,000 multi-purpose dam on the Karnafuli River in East Pakistan, which had been marred by mismanagement and corruption in U.S. aid projects. According to a report by Milt Freudenheim in the Chicago Daily News, the success of the Karnafuli River dam project under Azam Khan's administration, was characterised as the first major success of American aid in the region, earning him a reputation as a "get-things-done powerhouse."

== Construction ==
Starting in 1957, the initial phase of the construction was completed in 1962. By this time the dam, spillway, penstock, and two 40 MW Kaplan turbine generators were built in the power station. In August 1982 a 50 MW generator was commissioned. In October 1988 the fourth and fifth generating units, both 50 MW Kaplan-type turbines, were installed which raised the total generation capacity to 230 MW.

The total cost of Unit 1, Unit 2, and a part of Unit 3 was Rs. 503 million and the total cost of extension was Tk. 1,900 million. The project was financed by the East Pakistan Government (at the time), the United States, and the Overseas Economic Cooperation Fund.

== Description ==
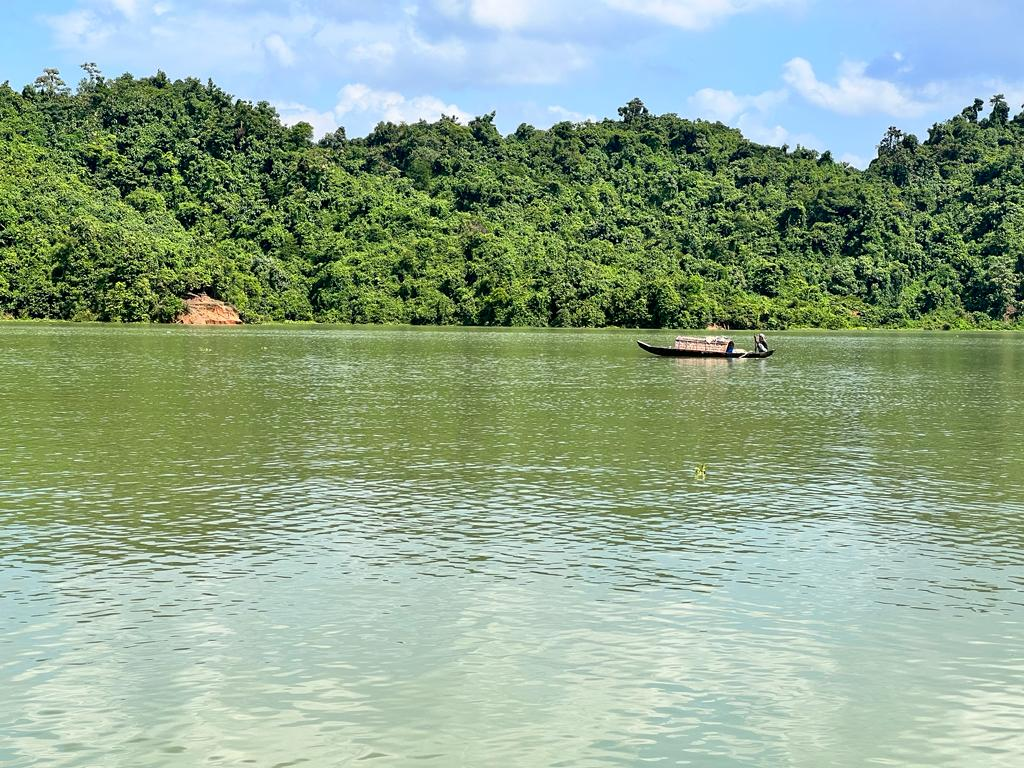
Boat on Kaptai Lake

The earthen dam is 670 m (2,200 ft) long and 45.7 m (150 ft) wide with a 16-gate spillway on the left side. The construction of the dam submerged 655 km^{2} (253 sq mi) area. This included 220 km^{2} (85 sq mi) of cultivable land, 40 percent of the cultivable land in the area, and displaced 18,000 families and 100,000 tribal people, of which 70% were Chakma. The dam flooded the original Rangamati town and other structures.

== Social and ecological effects ==
Inhabitants of the storage reservoir area who lost their homes and farmland due to flooding were not compensated. More than 40,000 Chakma tribals emigrated to Arunachal Pradesh, India. The scarcity of land is considered a main cause of the continuing conflict in the area.

The building of the dam and reservoir also caused the destruction of wilderness and the loss of wildlife and wildlife habitats.
