= Thega River =

River in India and Bangladesh

The Thega (Thega Khāl, Kawrpui Lui or Kawrpui River) is a river lying mostly between eastern Bangladesh and Mizoram, India. The river flows northwards and exits into the Karnaphuli River at 22°52′43″N 92°26′52″E. It originates in Myanmar(Burma) and is one of the main tributaries of the Karnafuli.
