= Tuichawng =

River in Mizoram, India

Tuichawng River

Location
- Country: India
- State: Mizoram, Assam

Physical characteristics
- Length: 107.87 km (67.03 mi)

The Tuichawng is a river of Mizoram, Northeast India. It is a tributary of Karnaphuli river.

== Geography ==
The length of the river is 107.87 kilometres (67.03 mi).

== Legend ==
British officer John Shakespear collected an untitled etiological tale from the Lushei people about the origin of the Tui-chong river. In this tale, Tui-chongi and her younger sister Nuengi walk through the forest on a hot day, and the elder, to provide water for her sister, transforms herself into a river (the Tui-chong river, tributary of the Kurnaphuli) to sate the latter's thirst. The stream, however, flows to the country of the Bengalis with a mighty force it draws the attention of the Bengali king, who sends people to find its origin. The forerunners trace its upstream origin and finds Nuengi, who they bring to their king. The monarch of Chittagong marries Nuengi, and makes her the youngest queen of his harem. In time, she gives birth to a son, who the elder co-queen replaces with a puppy and throws in the river. The Tui-chong river, who was still Tui-chongi, rescues the boy and raises him in the river. Nuengi gives birth to six other sons who share their elder brother's fate and are thrown in the river. Years later, their aunt, Tui-chongi, reveals her nephews their origins and bids them go and dance on the roof of their father's palace. It happens thus: annoyed at the disturbance, the king goes to check on its source, and sees the seven boys. The seven boys explain to the king they are his sons; the king reinstates Nuengi and punishes the elder co-queen. Anthropologist B. Lalthangliana published a version of the story titled Origin of the Tuaichawng River. The tale was also reprinted as Origin of the Tui-Chong stream, and sourced from the Lushai people.
