= Phairuang River =

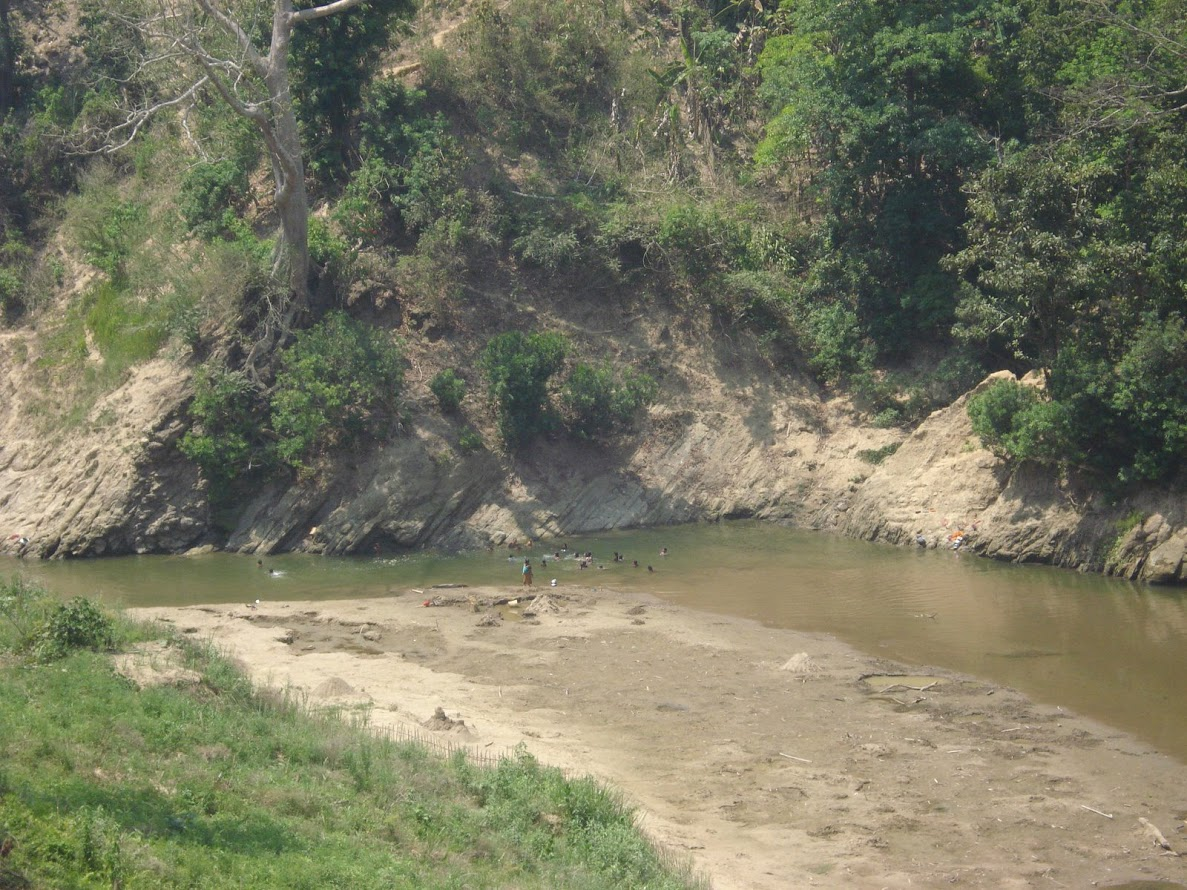

Location
- Country: India
- State: Mizoram

The Phairuang is a river located in Lunglei district of Mizoram, northeastern India. It is a tributary of the Karnaphuli river.
