= Kaptai Lake =

Man-made lake in Bangladesh

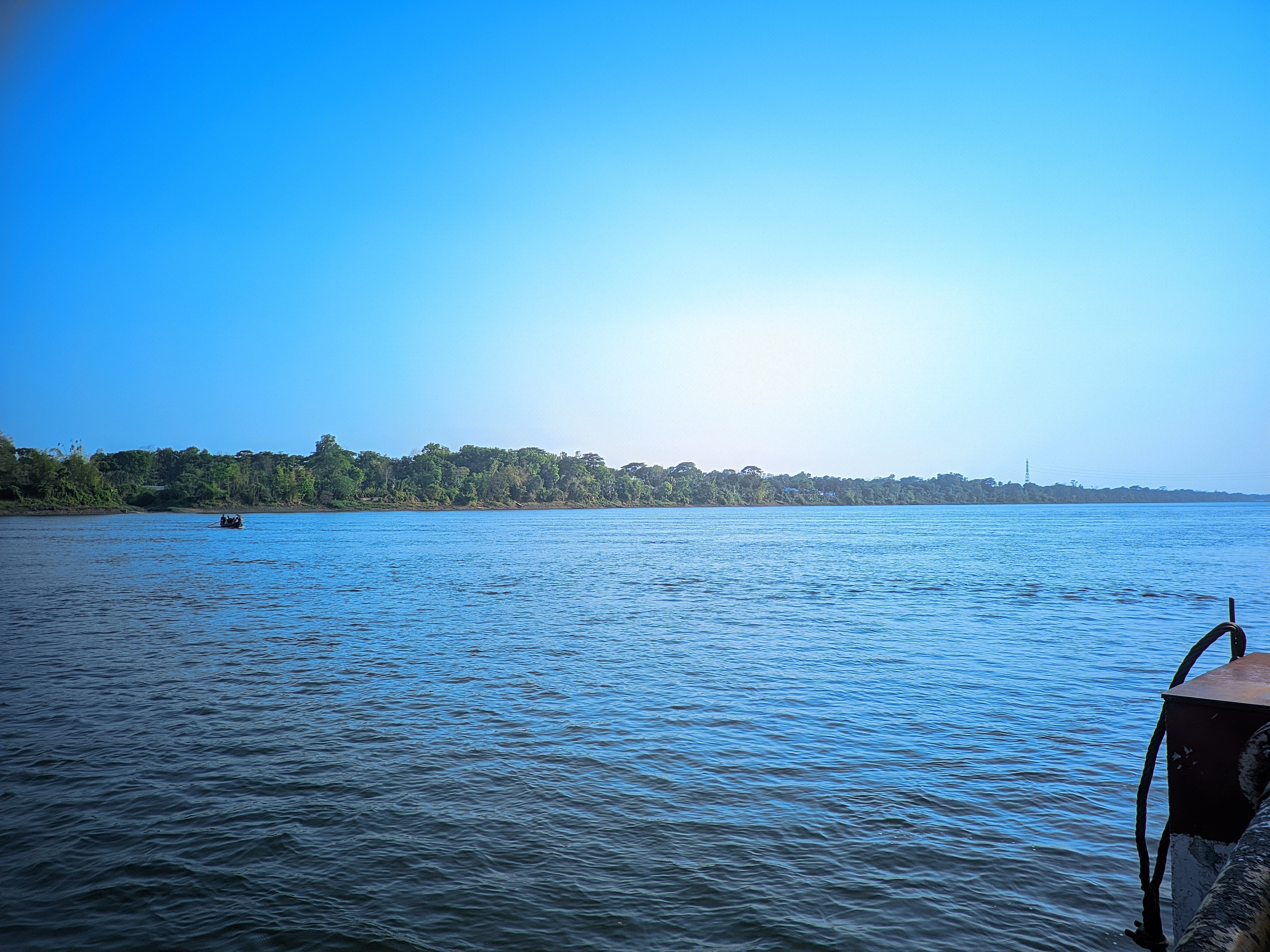
- Islets in the lake

- Location within Bangladesh
- Location: South-Eastern Bangladesh
- Coordinates: 22°29′45″N 92°13′45″E
- Type: reservoir
- Primary inflows: Karnaphuli River
- Primary outflows: Karnaphuli River
- Catchment area: 11,122 km^{2} (4,294 sq mi)
- Basin countries: Bangladesh
- Surface area: 688 km^{2} (266 sq mi)
- Average depth: 100 ft (30 m)
- Max. depth: 175 ft (53 m)

Kaptai Lake is the largest man-made lake in Bangladesh. It is located in the Kaptai Upazila under Rangamati District of Chittagong Division. The lake was created as a result of building the Kaptai Dam on the Karnaphuli River, as part of the Karnafuli Hydropower Station. Kaptai Lake's average depth is 100 feet (30 m) and maximum depth is 175 feet (53 m).

== History ==
Construction of the reservoir for the hydro-electric plant began in 1956 by the Government of East Pakistan. 54,000 acres (220 km^{2}) of farmland in the Rangamati District was submerged with the creation of the lake. The project was finished in 1961. 40% of the total arable land went underwater as a result of the dam construction and 100,000 people were displaced. The palace of the king of the Chakmas was also flooded and is also underwater. The International Engineering Company and Utah International Inc. received the contract for the construction of the dam. The dam is 670.8 meters long, and 54.7 meters high.

In early September 2024, amid continuous upstream water flow and heavy rainfall in Rangamati, the water level of Kaptai Lake reached the danger level, prompting the opening of 16 sluice gates. The sluice gates, opened to 3.5 feet to help reduce the lake's water level, resulted in the release of 68,000 cusecs of water per second into the Karnaphuli River. A day earlier, the sluices had been opened to 2.5 feet, but with the lake's water level still rising, the decision was made to increase the opening to 3.5 feet. The water level of Kaptai Lake at the time stood at 108.74 MSL (mean sea level), against the lake's maximum capacity of 109 MSL.

== Gallery ==
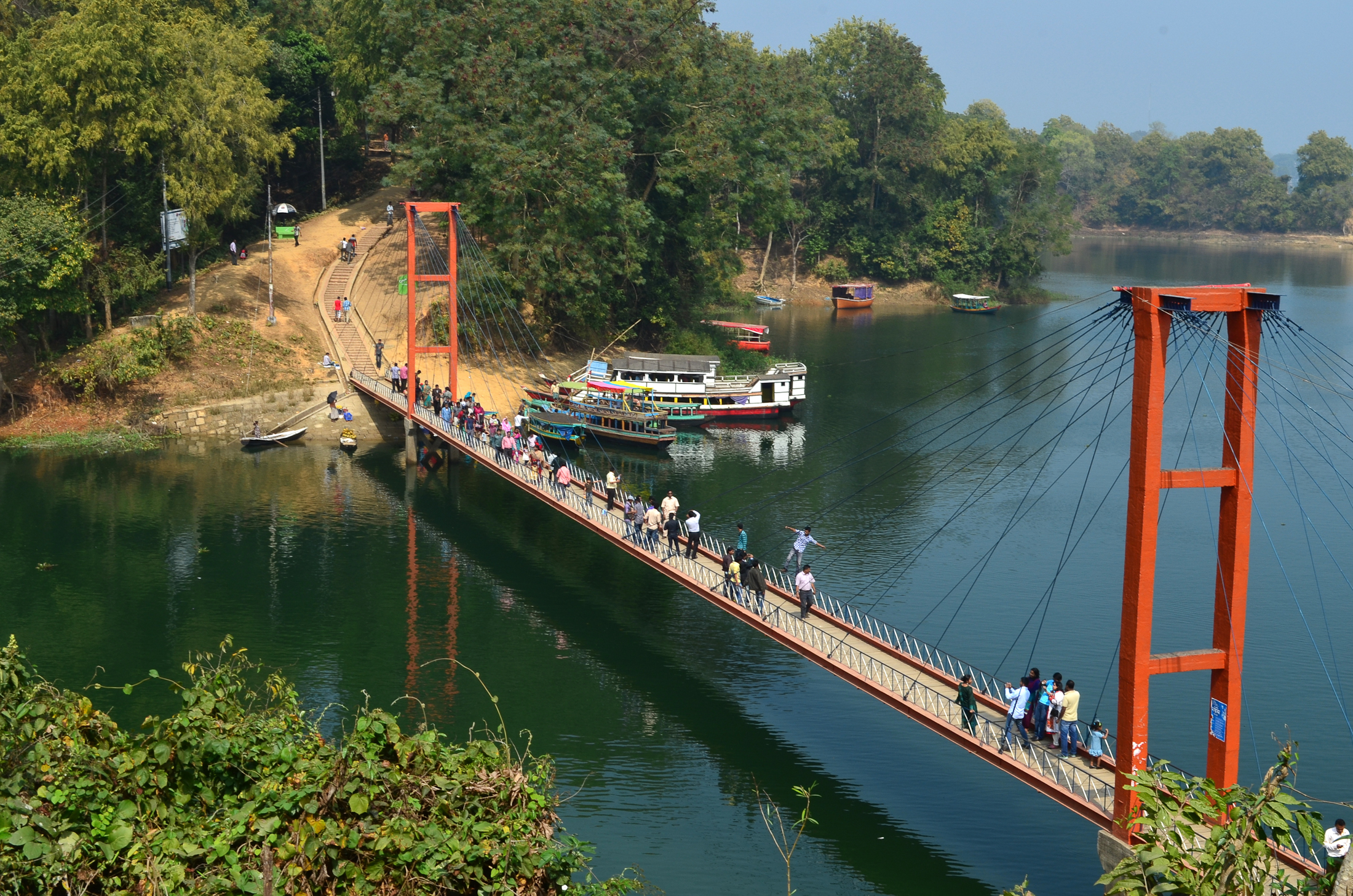
Hanging Bridge

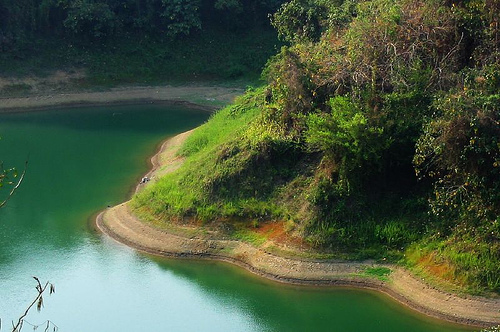
the lake

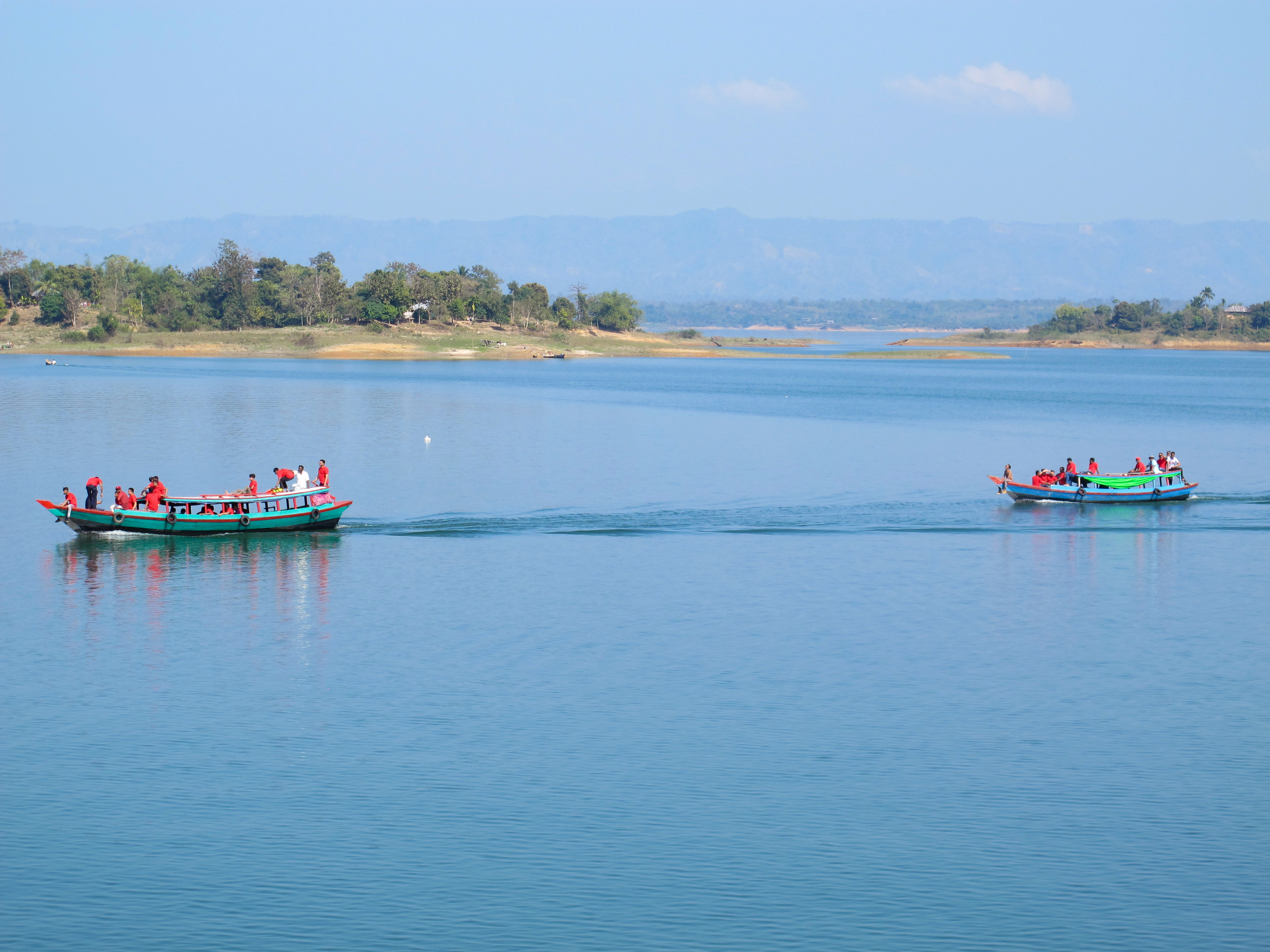
Wooden boats

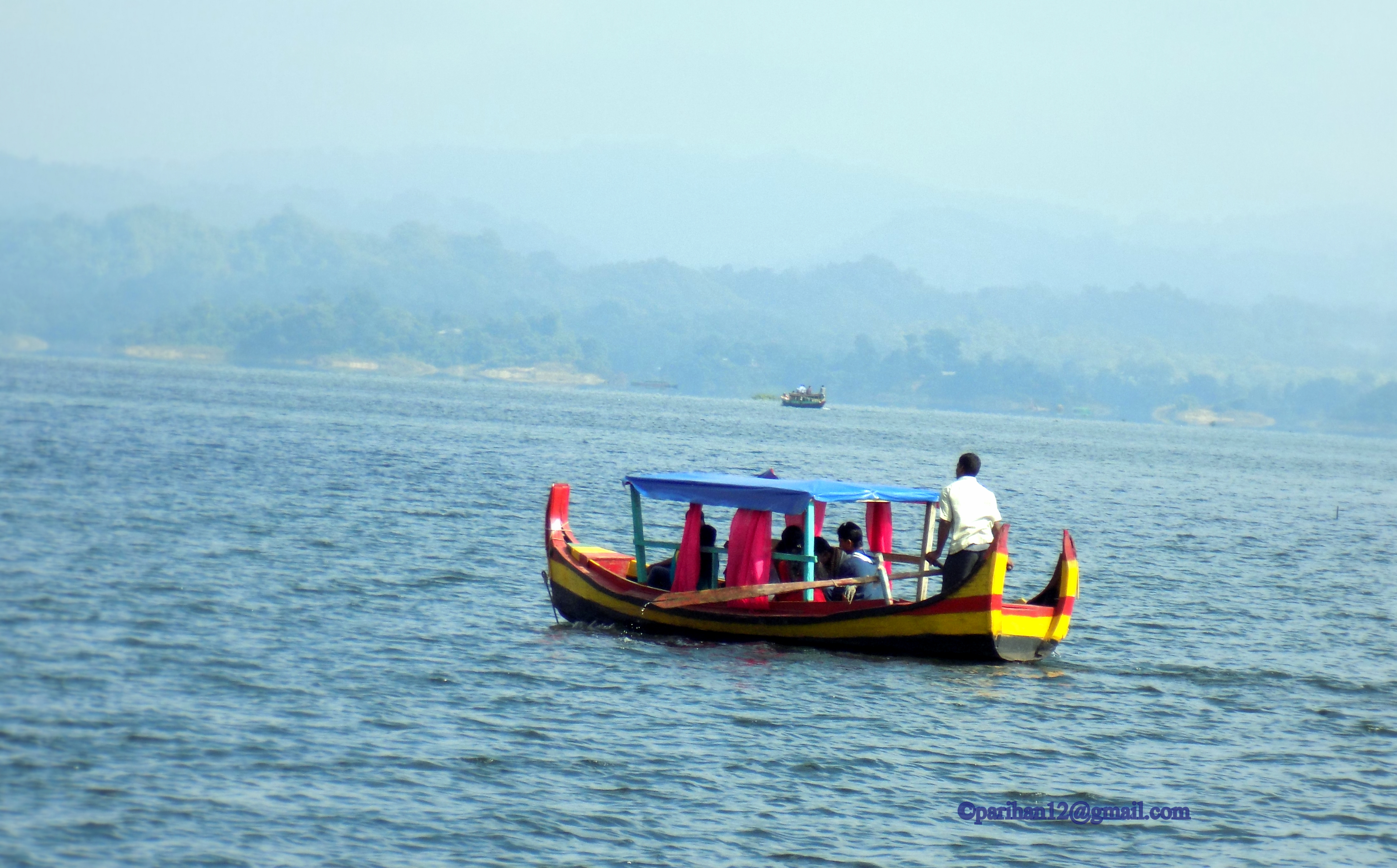
Boat on the lake

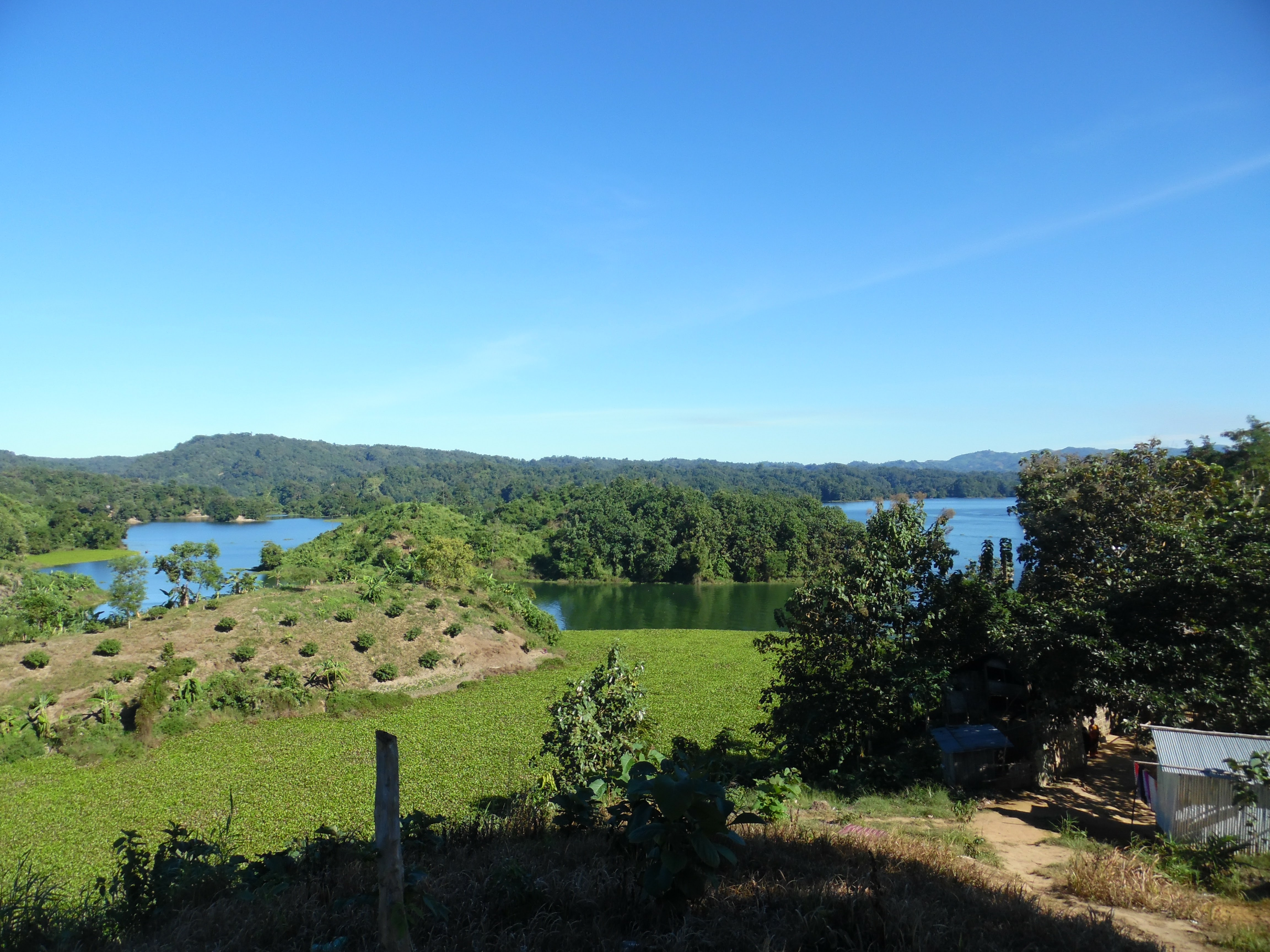
View of Kaptai lake, Rangamati

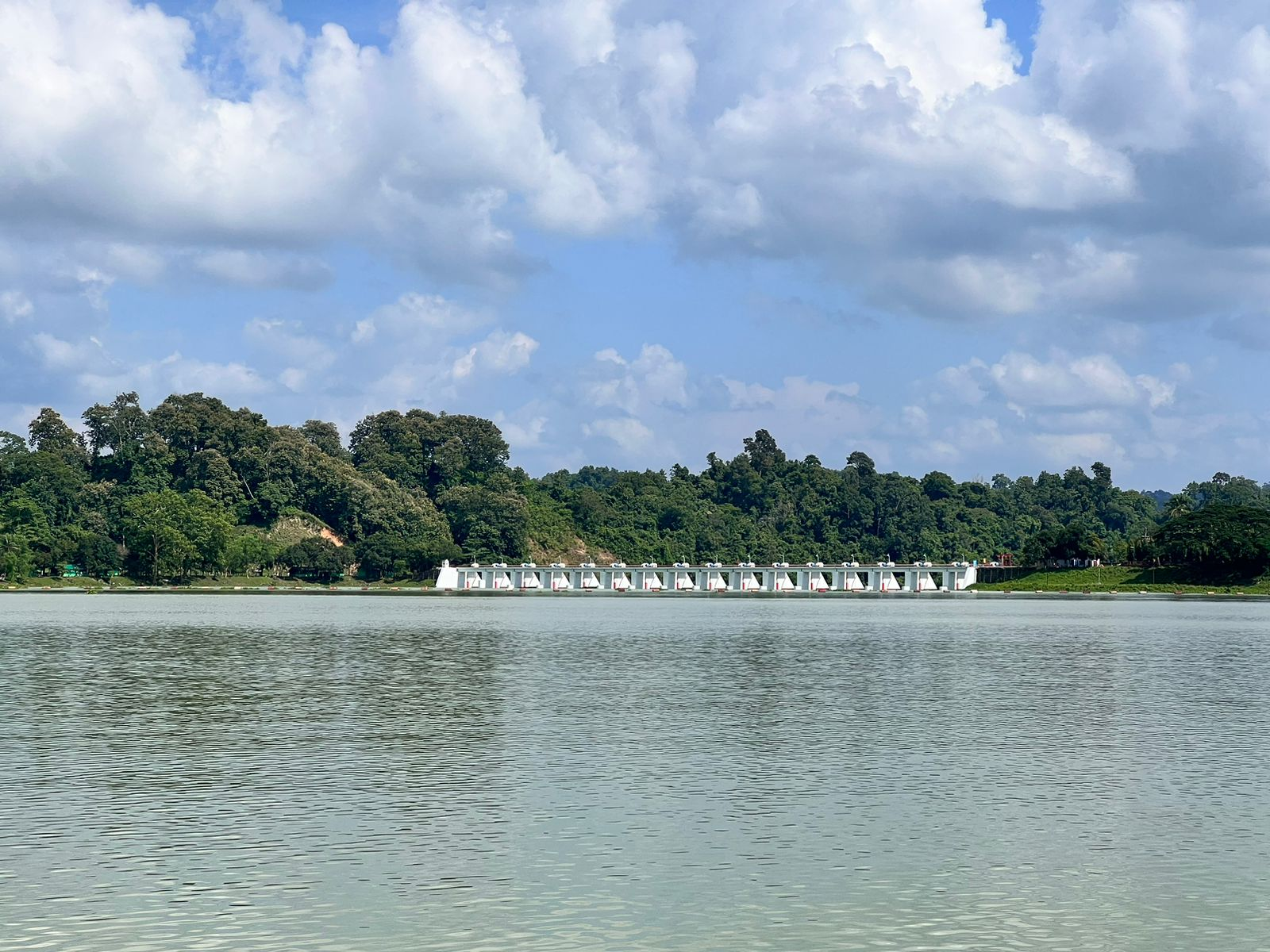
Kaptai Dam

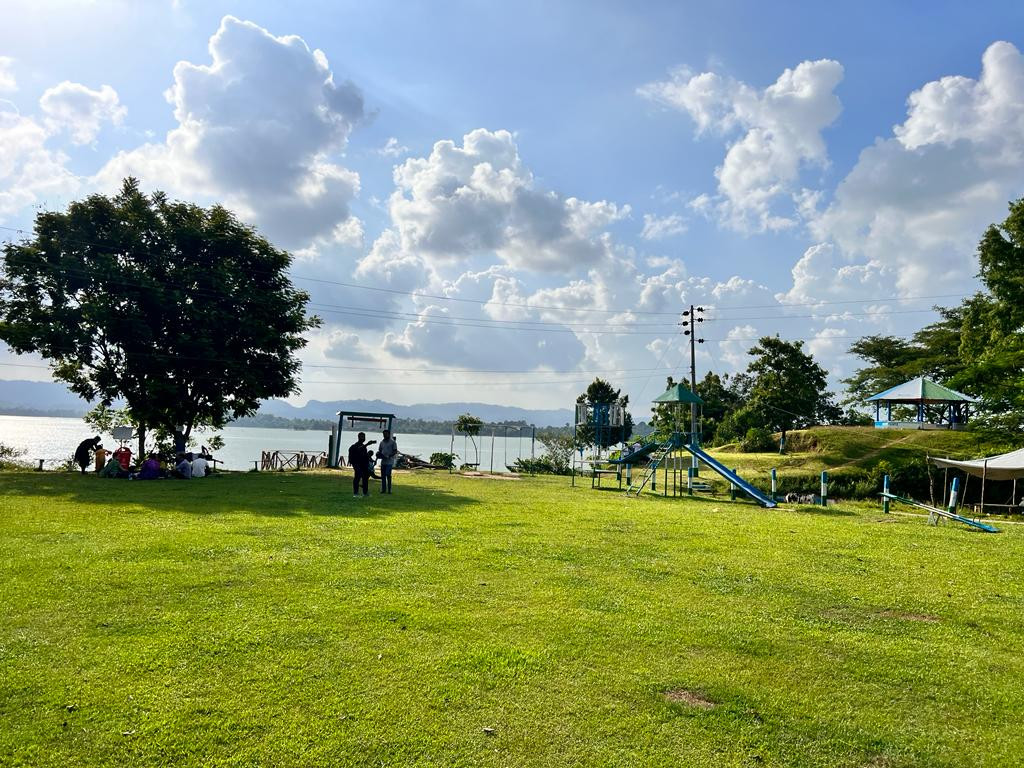
Kaptai

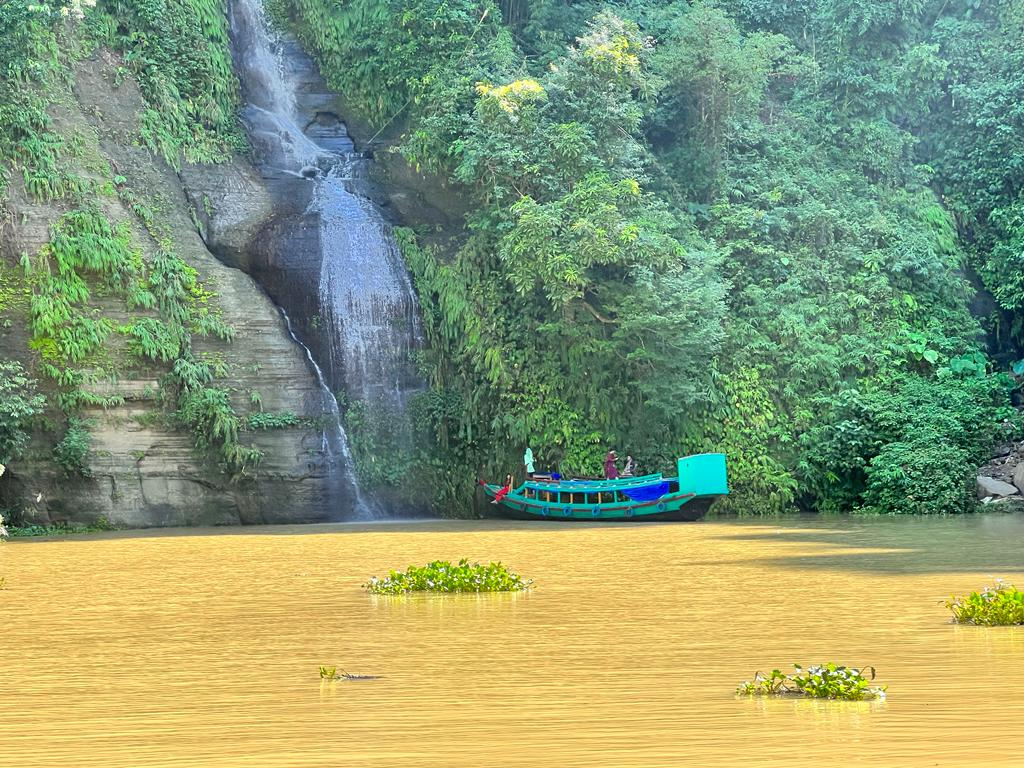
A Beautiful waterfall

== See also ==
- Mahamaya irrigation project
- Kaptai National Park
