= Karnaphuli =

Coordinates: 22°13′N 91°48′E

Karnaphuli River
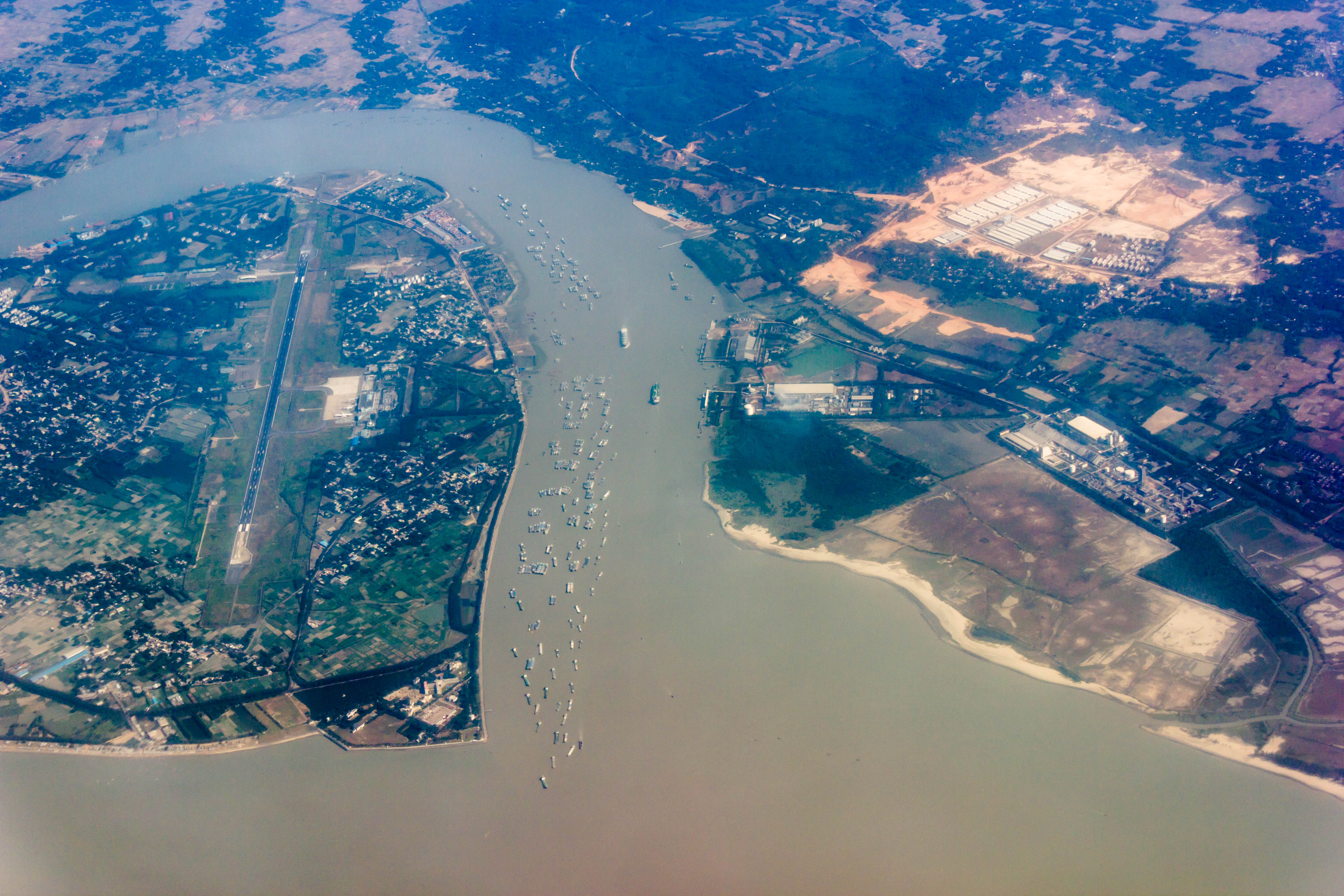
- Aerial view of the Karnaphuli River estuary

Location
- Countries: India and Bangladesh
- Cities: Chittagong

Physical characteristics
- Source
  - location: Saithah, Mizoram, India
- Mouth
  - location: Bay of Bengal
- Length: 270 km (170 mi)
- Basin size: 13,964.8 km^{2} (5,391.8 mi^{2})
- Discharge
  - location: Near mouth
  - average: 1,510 m^{3}/s (53,000 cu ft/s)

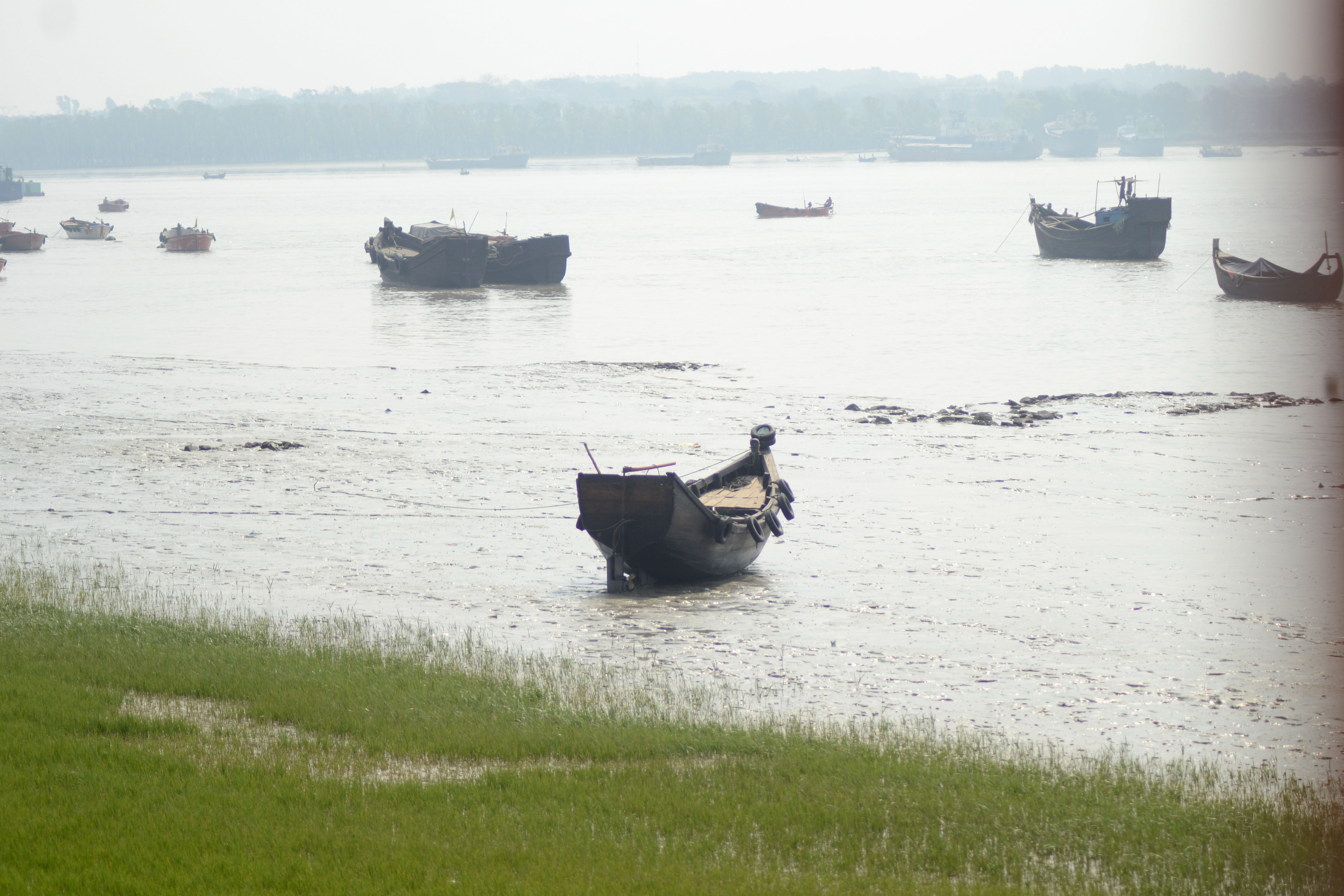
Karnaphuli river from BNA road

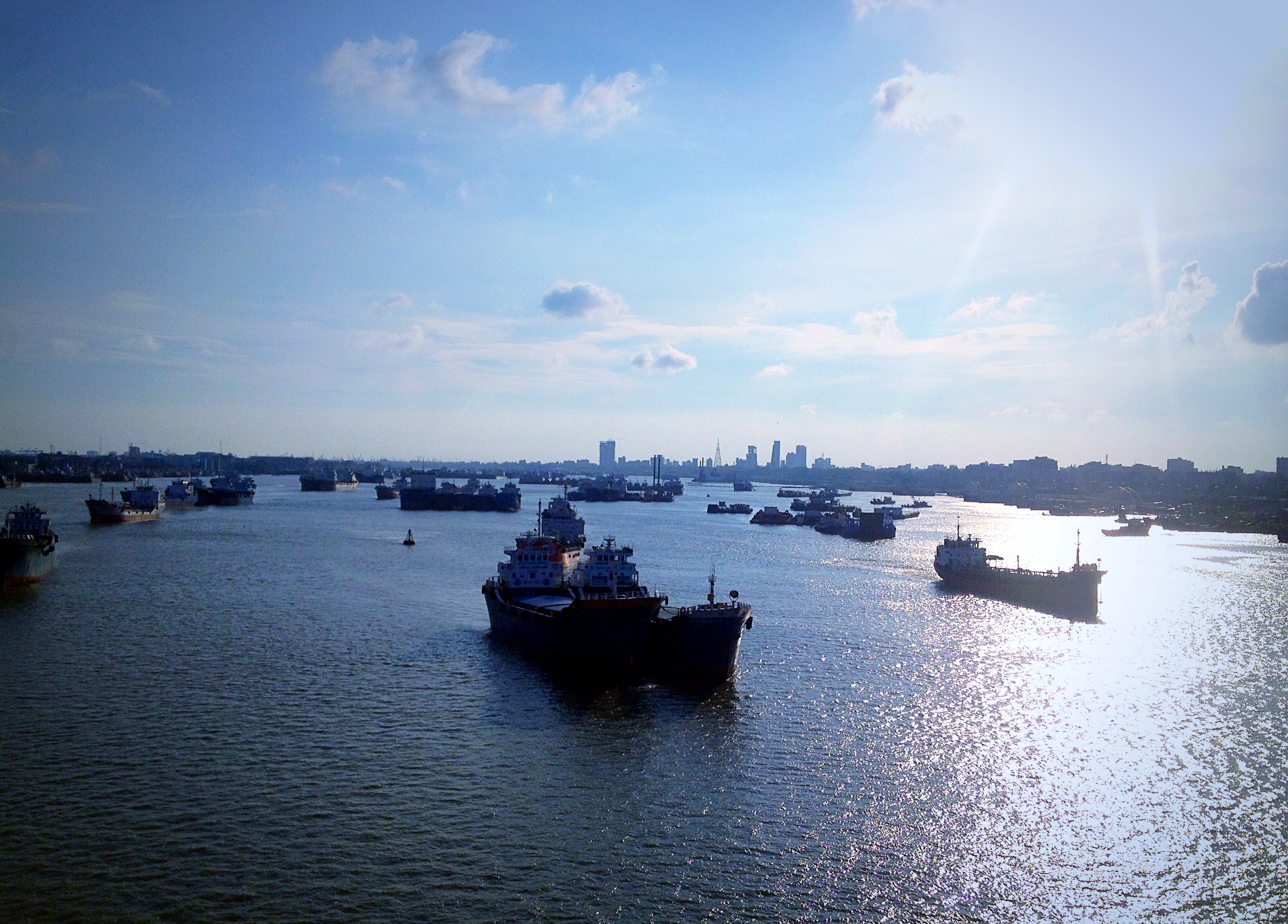
Karnaphuli River From Shah Amanat Bridge

The Karnaphuli River (Bengali: কর্ণফুলি Kôrnophuli; also spelt Karnafuli and Khawthlangtuipui in Mizo, meaning "western river" and Borgang in Chakma, meaning "Big River") is the largest and most important river in Chittagong and the Chittagong Hill Tracts. It is a 667-metre (2,188 ft) wide river in the south-eastern part of Bangladesh. Originating from the Saithah village of Mamit district in Mizoram, India, it flows 270 kilometres (170 mi) southwest through Chattogram Hill Tracts and Chattogram into the Bay of Bengal. It is the fastest flowing river in Bangladesh, after the Padma.

The river is said to "represent the drainage system of the whole south-western part of Mizoram." Principal tributaries include the Kawrpui River or Thega River, Tuichawng River and Phairuang River. A large hydroelectric power plant was built on the Karnaphuli in the Kaptai region in the 1960s. The mouth of the river hosts the Port of Chattogram, the largest and busiest seaport of Bangladesh.

== Etymology ==
The presence of Arab traders and merchants in the history of Chittagong led to many areas in Chittagong to have names of Arabic origin. The name of this river is thought to have come from qarnaful, the Arabic word for clove, and refers to an incident in which an Arab ship full of cloves sank in this river.

== Course ==
=== Chittagong City ===
Chittagong is situated on the banks of the Karnaphuli River between the Chittagong Hill Tracts and the Bay of Bengal. The city is a noteworthy seaside seaport city and monetary focus in southeastern Bangladesh. The Chittagong Metropolitan Area has a populace of more than 8.9 million, making it the second biggest city in Bangladesh. It is the capital of an eponymous locale and division. A water treatment plant has been set up by Chittagong Port Authority to source water from the Karnaphuli river for its uses. The plant will make the port self-reliant in its water needs.

=== Demagiri(Tlabung) ===
Demagiri is situated on the banks of the Karnaphuli River in Lunglei district, Mizoram. Karnaphuli River links Mizoram with the port city of Chittagong on the shores of Bay of Bengal. British Troops and missionaries used this route to reach Mizoram during the Colonial days. It used to take 5 days to reach from Chittagong to Demagiri on a motorboat, a distance of about 90 kilometers, after which they would travel another 35 kilometers to reach Lunglei.

== Transport ==
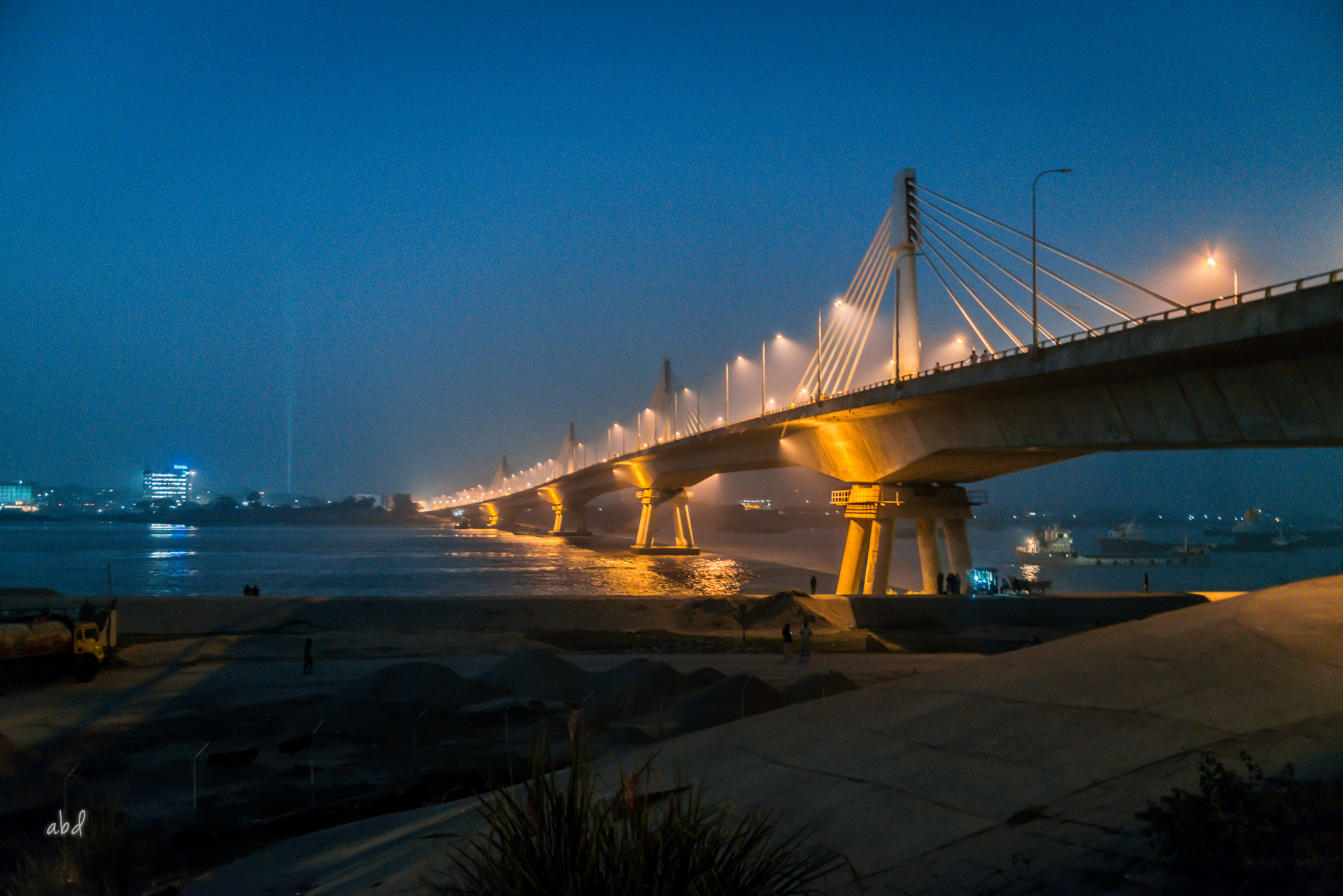
Shah Amanat Bridge

The government had awarded a contract to build a two lane Karnaphuli tunnel underneath the Karnaphuli river to China Communication Construction Company (CCCC). This is the first underwater tunnel in Bangladesh. CCCC received $706 million for its services, with total costs expected to be over $1 billion.

== Kaptai dam ==
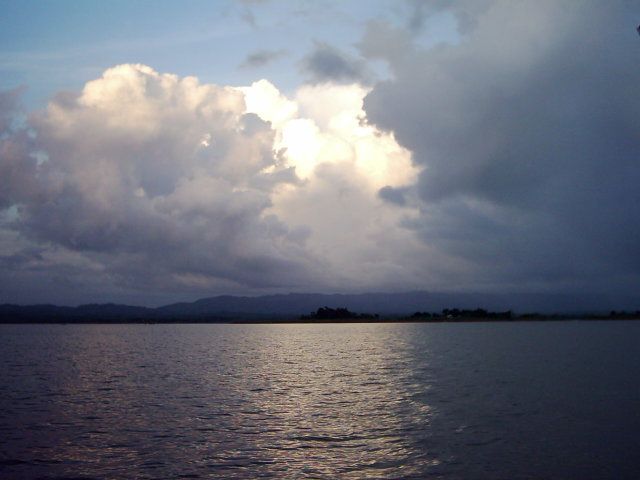
Kaptai Lake on Karnaphuli River

The Kaptai Dam is the location of the Karnafuli Hydroelectric Power Station, constructed in Kaptai in 1962 and the only hydroelectric power plant in the country. An earth-filled dam on the Karnaphuli River, the Kaptai Dam, created the Kaptai Lake, which acts as the water reservoir for the hydropower station. The power plant produces a total of 230 megawatts of electricity. When then east Pakistan built the dam, Indian Prime Minister Jawaharlal Nehru didn't object even though it resulted in part of Indian side getting submerged and inflow of more than 40000 refugees.

== Pollution ==
Like many rivers in Bangladesh, Karnaphuli is heavily polluted by agricultural runoff. Reducing the amount of oxygen available and harming aquatic life in the river. In 2015, a train carrying oil crashed over a tributary of the river. The spill caused environmental degradation.

== Aquatic life ==
The river is home to the Ganges river dolphin, which is an endangered species. Hilsa used to be common in the river, but have nearly disappeared from the river due to pollution.

== Gallery ==
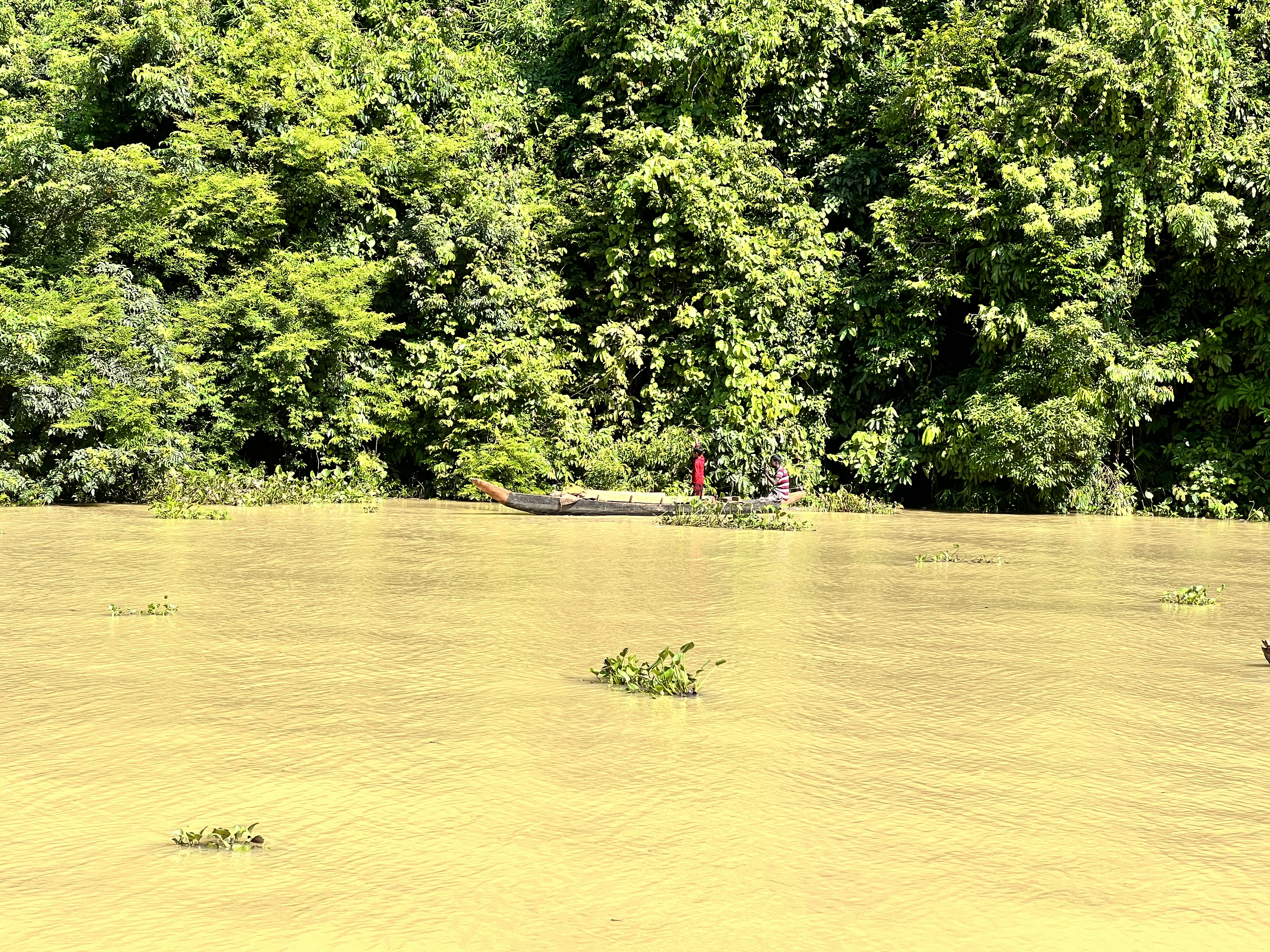
View from the middle of the Karnafuli

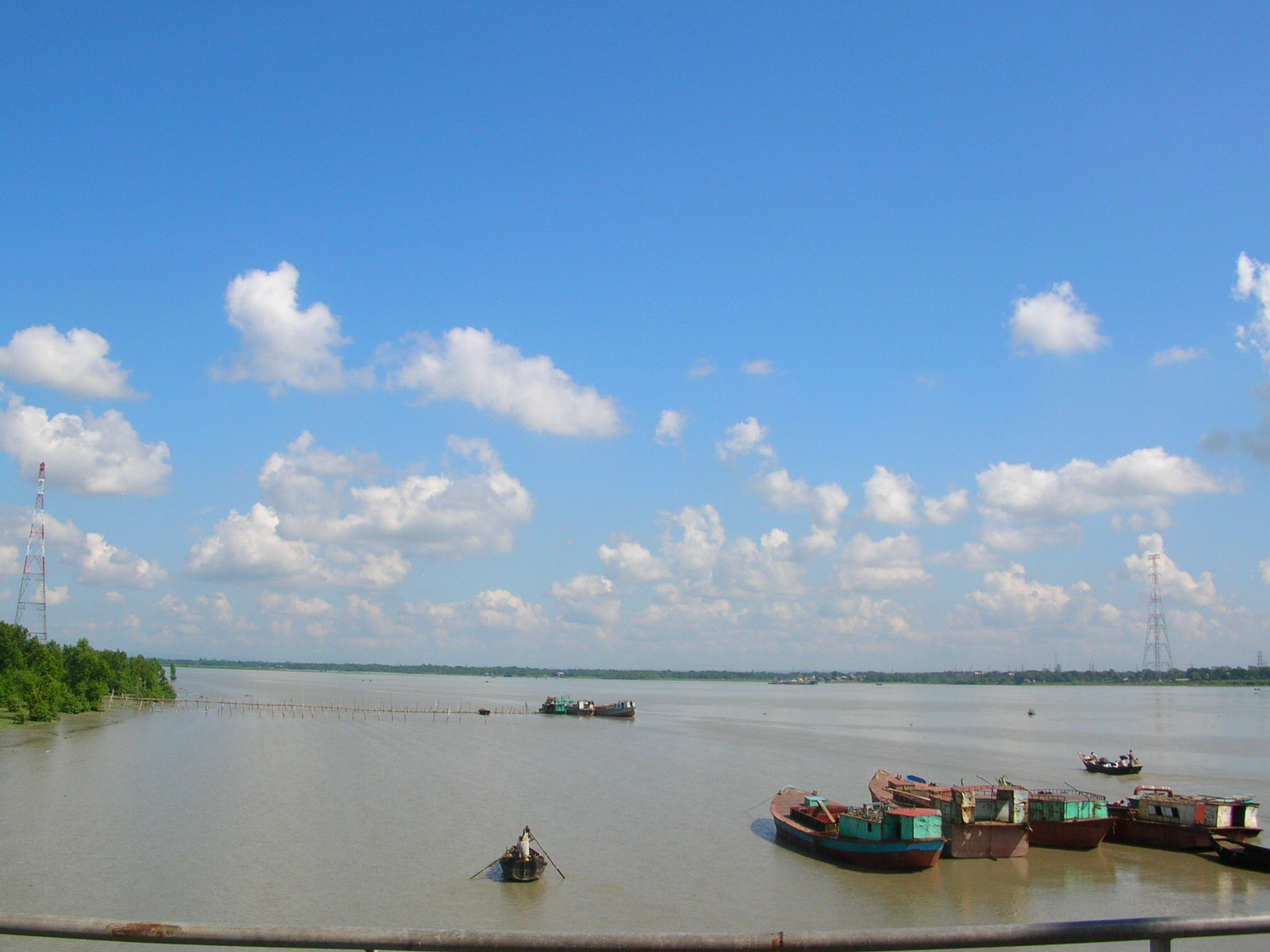
View of the river

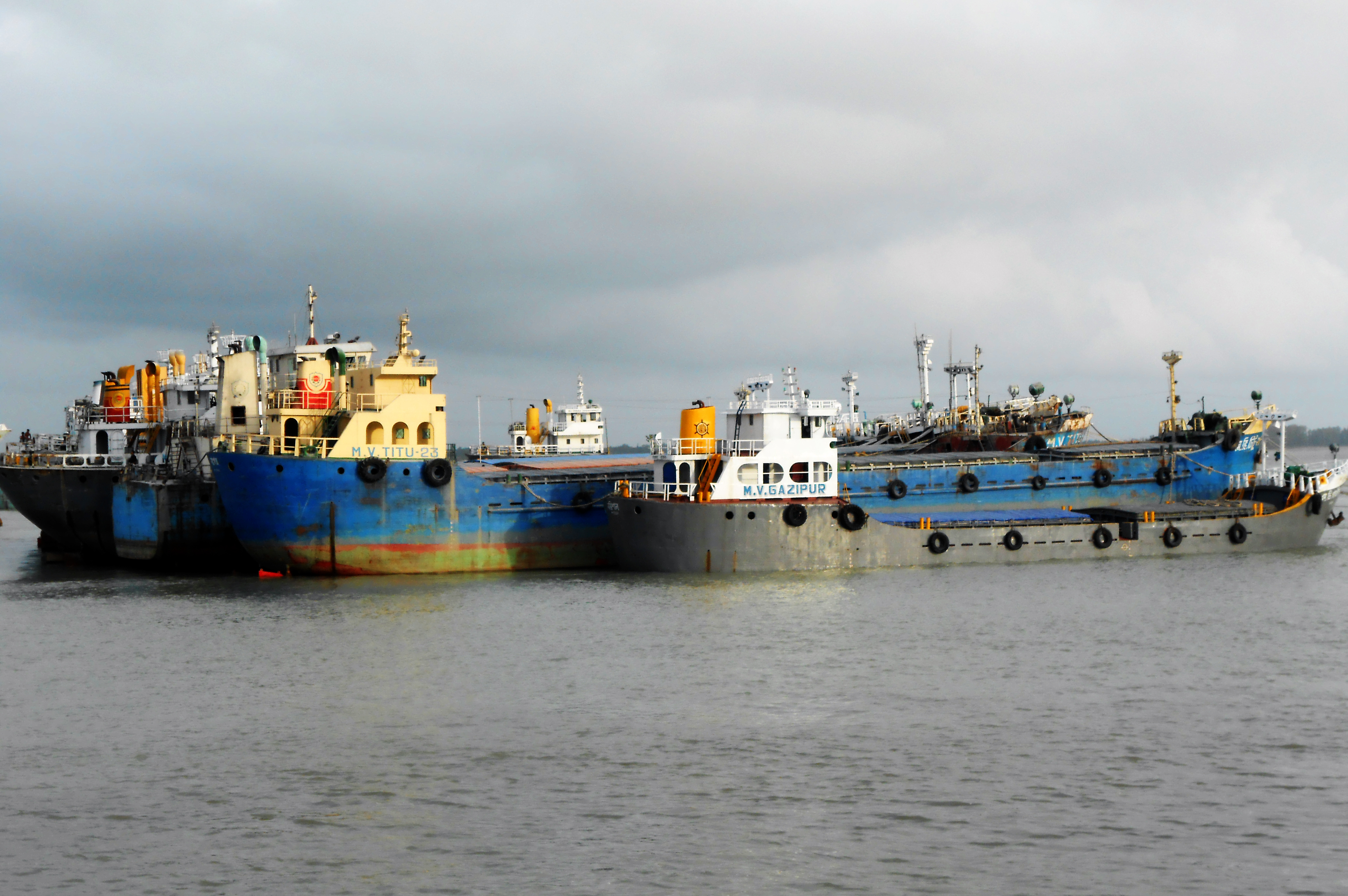
Ships at Karnaphuli River

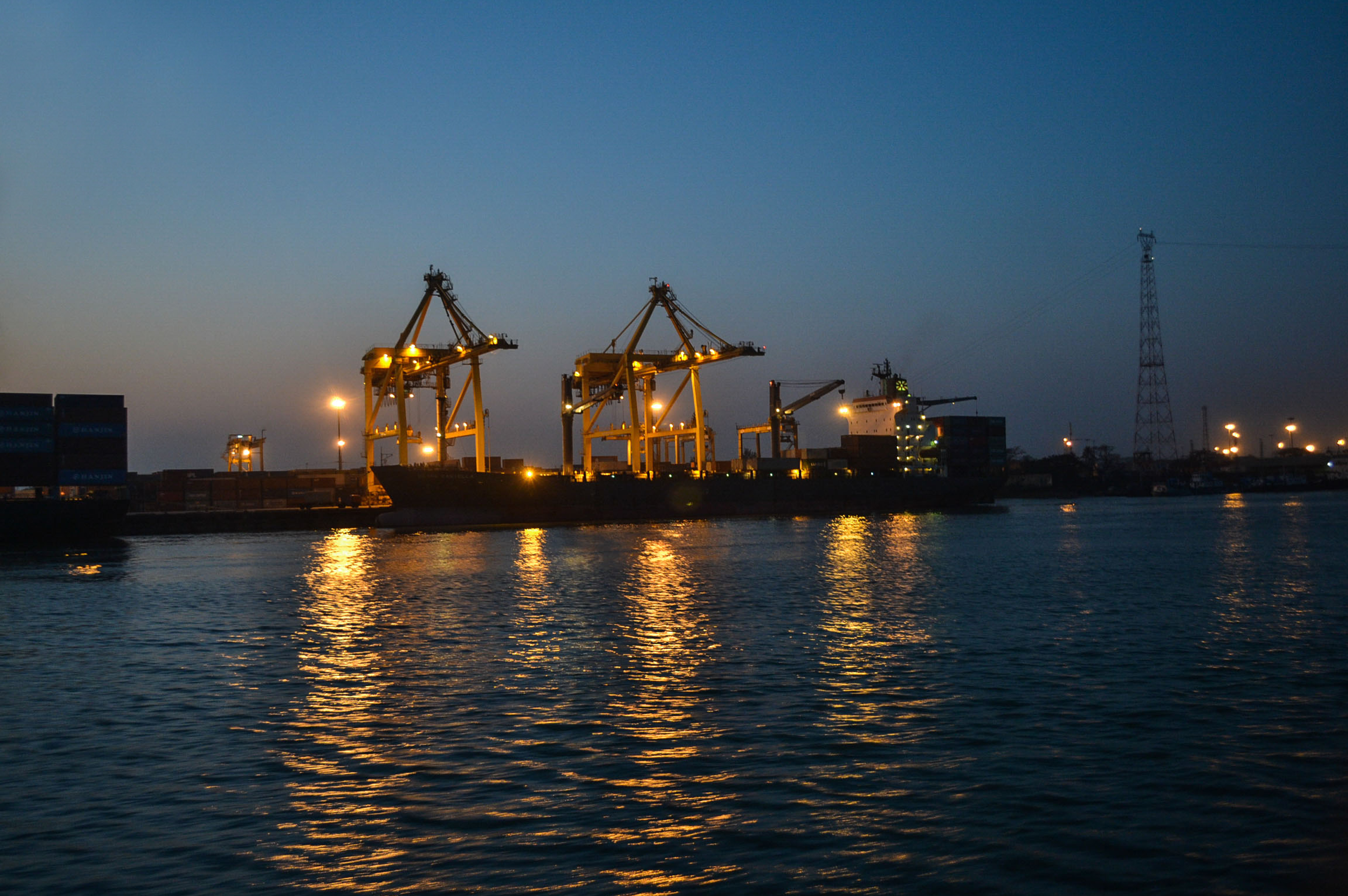
Port of Chittagong and Karnaphuli River at night

== See also ==
- List of rivers in Bangladesh
